= Regionalist leagues in Italy =

1980s and 1990s political movement in Italy

Timeline
1979	Liga Veneta
1980
1981	Piedmontese Union
1982
1983	Liga Federativa Veneta
1984	Lega Lombarda
1984	Liga Veneta Serenissima
1985–1986
1987	Movement for Tuscany
1987	Autonomist Piedmont
1987	Autonomist Union
1987	Union of the Venetian People
1988
1989	Ligurian Union
1989	Lega Emiliano-Romagnola
1989	Alleanza Lombarda Autonomia
1989	Lega Autonomia Veneta
1990
1991	Lega Nord
1991	Lega Nuova
1992	Lega Alpina Lumbarda
1992	Southern Action League
1993	League of Leagues
1993	League for Piedmont
1993	Lega Autonomia Friuli
1993	Lega Autonomia Trentino
1994	Liga Nathion Veneta
1995	Federalist Italian League
1996	Lega Sud Ausonia
1996	Lega per l'Autonomia – Alleanza Lombarda
1997
1998	Liga Veneta Repubblica
1999	Lega Padana
1999	Liga dei Veneti
2000
2001	Liga Fronte Veneto
2002–2007
2008	Lega Lombardo Veneta
2009
2010	Liga Veneto Autonomo

Regionalist "leagues" were established, especially in northern Italy, since the 1970s. The six main central-northern leagues were eventually merged into Lega Nord in 1991.

== Ideology ==
The parties were opposed to the centralised tax policy, political system and the corruption. Eventually, the movement became an anti-system party against partitocrazia. In its early years, the leagues supported European federalism allying themselves with the European Federalist Party. Afterwards, most of them moved towards Euroscepticism. The movement believed that northern Italy subsidized the poorer South through taxes. Lega Nord's position towards the South was even compared to racism. While Lega Nord joined the centre-right coalition, other parties joined the centre-left coalition or remained independent.

== Lega Nord and splinter groups ==
In the 1960s the Venetian Regionalist Autonomous Movement campaigned for the institution of the ordinary regions, including Veneto, prefigured by the Italian Constitution. In 1979 Liga Veneta was the first league to be established. It was inspired by and cooperated with other similar regionalist parties like the Ossolan Union for Autonomy (UOPA), formed in 1977, and more established regionalist parties like the Valdostan Union (UV) and the Friuli Movement. Umberto Bossi, who would launch Lega Lombarda in 1984, and UOPA ran on UV's Federalism list in the 1979 European Parliament election.

During the 1980s, the List for Trieste (1983) and Liga Veneta (1984) lent their symbols to other leagues allowing them to compete in elections. In 1989, Lega Lombarda, Liga Veneta, Piemont Autonomista, Union Ligure, Lega Emiliano-Romagnola and Alleanza Toscana ran on the Lega Lombarda – Alleanza Nord list. In 1991, the Lega Nord was established as a federation of these leagues.

In 1989, Bossi's brother-in-law split from Liga Veneta and founded Alleanza Lombarda Autonomia (ALA). By 1996, Lega Alpina Lumbarda (which won a seat in 1992), the Piedmontese Union, the Valdostan Autonomist Union and ALA merged into Lega per l'Autonomia – Alleanza Lombarda (LAL). Lega Autonomia Veneta, Lega Autonomia Friuli and Lega Autonomia Trentino established in 1993 Lega delle Regioni and later the North-East Movement. Another more long-lived competitor, Liga Veneta Repubblica (LVR) was established in 1998. None of these ever gained major success but both the LAL (0.12%) and the LVR (0.06%) were crucial for the victory of The Union over the House of Freedoms backed by Lega Nord in the 2006 general election. In Veneto rival groups have included the North-East Project (2004), Venetian Independence (2012) and the Party of Venetians (2019).

In the autonomous regions of Trentino-Alto Adige/Südtirol and Aosta Valley, the South Tyrolean People's Party, the Trentino Tyrolean Autonomist Party and the already-mentioned UV were already active limiting the leagues' success there. In the 1990s, LVR and the Lega delle Regioni joined the wider Federalismo coalition. In the late 2000s and early 2010s Lega Nord allied with UV's Aosta Valley coalition and sometimes with South Tyrol's Die Freiheitlichen.

Lega Nord joined the Pole of Freedoms, along with Forza Italia, in 1994. After Lega Nord broke the alliance later that year, splinter groups formed the Federalist Party, the Federalist Italian League and the Federalists and Liberal Democrats, none of which obtained electoral success. Lega Nord returned to the centre-right coalition in 2001. Under Matteo Salvini, Lega Nord rebranded as Lega per Salvini Premier, ran countrywide and adopted a right-wing populist posture. Other notable splits have included the Autonomists for Europe (1999) and the Pact for the North (2024).

=== Case history: 1992 Senate election in Lombardy ===
For the 1992 general election, 71 symbols for "leagues" were submitted. They included an alliance between Lega Nuova and the Italian Democratic Socialist Party, Piemont Liber and the Housewives Pensioners League (which included former members of Autonomist Greens, Pensioners' Party and the earlier Union Ligure). Lega Nord saw these minor lists as spoiler parties.

1992 Italian Senate election in Lombardy
Party	Votes	%
Lega Lombarda	1,150,022	20.46
Lega Alpina Lumbarda	119,153	2.12
Housewives Pensioners League	65,712	1.17
PSDI–Lega Nuova	64,393	1.15
Lega Lombardia Libera	52,366	0.93
Alleanza Lombarda Autonomia	32,748	0.58

== Outside north-central Italy ==
As a reaction to Lega Nord's hostile stance toward southern Italy, Neo-Bourbonism was reawakened. Former members of the Italian Social Movement founded the Southern Action League. Nevertheless, Lega Nord tried to gain a foothold in the South. In the mid-1990s, LN ran as Lega Italia Federale in Central and Southern Italy, they founded the Lega Sud Ausonia which distanced from the Lega Nord in the early 2000s and the Federalist Alliance as its replacement in 2003. Us with Salvini in 2014 was the last attempt in forming a Southern sister-party. Only when Lega Nord transformed into Lega in 2018, Lega was able to establish itself in southern Italy, South Tyrol and the Aosta Valley. Other southern regionalist parties have included the Sicily-based Movement for Autonomy, while Sardinia also has had a long history of Sardinian nationalism and regionalist parties, notably including the Sardinian Action Party-

== Outside Italy ==
Outside of Italy, the leagues inspired the Ticino League in Switzerland and the Popular Alliance in San Marino. The Savoyan League had some success in the 1998 regional elections outperforming the older Savoy Region Movement but it could not run again when parties had to put list in any department of a region. In 2010, Jacques Bompard founded the League of the South which was inspired by Lega Nord. Similarly to the Popular Alliance and Lega Sud, Greeks for the Fatherland (founded in 2020) adopted a logo inspired by Lega's Monument to the Warrior of Legnano with a statue of Leonidas I but the party was de facto neofascist and acted as a replacement for Golden Dawn.
