= List of political parties in Italy =

With the Italian unification in 1861, numerous political parties began operating as part of Italian politics. Since World War II, no party has ever gained enough support to govern alone, thus parties form political alliances and coalition governments. Coalitions of parties for regional elections can be slightly different from those for general elections due to different regional conditions (for instance, the Democratic Party and the Five Star Movement are in coalition but not in other Italian regions, and the same applies to the Democratic Party and the former Third Pole) and the presence of several regional parties, some of which active only at regional level.

In the 2022 Italian general election, four groupings obtained most of the votes and most of the seats in the two houses of the Italian Parliament: the centre-right coalition composed of Brothers of Italy, Lega, Forza Italia, and minor allies; the centre-left coalition composed of the Democratic Party and minor allies; the populist Five Star Movement; and the liberal Action – Italia Viva (also known as the Third Pole).

== History ==
=== 1890s–1940s ===
The first modern political party in Italy was the Italian Socialist Party, established in 1892. Until then, the main political groupings of the country, the Historical Right and the Historical Left, were not classifiable as parties but represented simple groups of notables, each with their own electoral fiefdom, that joined together according to their own ideas. From time to time, in the context of the Historical Far Left, other parties emerged: the Italian Republican Party, established in 1895; and the Italian Radical Party, established in 1904.

The Italian Socialist Party envisaged itself as a mass party, a form of party that would dominate throughout the 20th century. It was followed a few years later by the Italian People's Party, established in 1919. Both parties achieved electoral success until the advent of Italian fascism, contributing decisively to the loss of strength and authority of the old liberal ruling class, which had not been able to structure itself into a proper party: the Liberals' grouping, launched in 1913, was not a coherent one and the Italian Liberal Party, formed in 1922, came too late. The beginning of 1921 saw the foundation of the Communist Party of Italy, born from a split of the Italian Socialist Party. Also in 1921, Benito Mussolini gave birth to the National Fascist Party, and the next year, through the March on Rome, he was appointed Prime Minister of Italy. In 1926, through the leggi fascistissime (lit. 'very fascist laws'), all parties were dissolved except the National Fascist Party, which thus remained the only legal party in the Kingdom of Italy until the fall of the fascist regime in Italy in July 1943.

Following the dissolution of the Communist International in May 1943, the Communist Party of Italy was rebranded Italian Communist Party. In September 1943, six anti-fascist parties (the Christian Democracy, the Italian Socialist Party, the Italian Communist Party, the Italian Liberal Party, the Action Party, and the Labour Democratic Party) formed the joint National Liberation Committee, which gained official recognition as the representative of the Italian resistance movement (the National Liberation Committee recognised the Italian monarchs, thus the Italian Republican Party stayed out because of its full loyalty to republican principles). The parties then formed in various combinations the governments of Italy from the liberation of Rome in 1944 until 1947, when the Italian Communist Party and the Italian Socialist Party were ejected.

=== 1940s–1990s ===
With the 1946 Italian institutional referendum, Italy became a republic and a Constituent Assembly wrote the republican Constitution of Italy. Between 1948 and 1992, the party system was dominated by two major parties: Christian Democracy, the structural party of government, and the Italian Communist Party, the main opposition party. Another stable opposition party was the Italian Social Movement, a neo-fascist party founded by Mussolini's fascist followers, which was subjected to a cordon sanitaire and excluded from the Constitutional Arch. When the short-lived Tambroni government received the necessary vote of confidence from the Italian Parliament thanks to the support of the Italian Social Movement in 1960, a unique case in the history of the Italian Republic, it sparked significant criticism and protests. For about half a century, following a conventio ad excludendum of the Italian Communist Party, the governments were led by Christian Democracy, which chose its coalition partners among smaller parties situated either to its left or right: the Italian Socialist Party, the Italian Democratic Socialist Party, the Italian Liberal Party, and the Italian Republican Party.

The Italian system of centrism, which began in 1947 with the expulsion of the Italian Communist Party and the Italian Socialist Party were ejected, lasted until around 1958, when the organic centre-left began to take root and governed the country between from 1963 to 1976, leading to the Historic Compromise between Christian Democracy and the Italian Communist Party. Between 1981 and 1991, with the failure of the Historic Compromise the Christian Democrats formed coalition governments named Pentapartito with Italian Socialist Party, the Italian Democratic Socialist Party, the Italian Liberal Party, and the Italian Republican Party. That was the time when several Northern Italy regional parties, whose policy themes were federalism and autonomism, were established. In 1991, they federated themselves into Lega Nord, which became the country's fourth largest party in the 1992 Italian general election.

=== 1990s–2020s ===
From 1991 to 1993, Italy was governed by the Quadripartito, which included all parties of the Pentapartito with the exception of the Italian Republican Party. Between 1992 and 1994, the established party system was shaken by a series of corruption scandals known collectively as Tangentopoli. These events led to the disappearance of the five parties of government. Consequently, the Italian Communist Party, which had evolved to become the Democratic Party of the Left in 1991, with the exit of the Communist Refoundation Party, and the post-fascists, who had launched National Alliance in 1994, gained strength. On the contrary, Christian Democracy, which changed its name to Italian People's Party in 1994, lost its centrality in the Italian party system. Following the 1994 Italian general election, media tycoon Silvio Berlusconi became Prime Minister at the head of a government composed mainly of his brand-new Forza Italia party, joined by several members of the defunct mainstream parties, National Alliance and Lega Nord.

Between 1996 and 2008, the political parties were organised into two big coalitions, which took turns in government: the centre-right Pole for Freedoms, which was renamed House of Freedoms after the re-entry of Lega Nord in 2000, and The Olive Tree, lately part of a broader coalition named The Union, on the centre-left. As for the centre-left, the Democratic Party of the Left changed its name again in 1998, becoming Democrats of the Left, while in 2002 a new party called Democracy is Freedom – The Daisy was founded by the merger of some centrist parties (including the Italian People's Party). In 2008, following the fall of the centre-left government led by Romano Prodi, the Democratic Party (established in 2007 upon the merger of the Democrats of the Left and The Daisy) decided to break the alliance with the Communist Refoundation Party and other minor left-wing parties. Contextually, on the centre-right of the political spectrum, Forza Italia and National Alliance merged to form The People of Freedom, which continued the alliance with Lega Nord and prevailed in the 2008 Italian general election.

In the 2013 Italian general election, the party system was fragmented in four groupings: the centre-left alliance led by the Democratic Party; the traditional centre-right alliance between the People of Freedom, Lega Nord, and the newly-founded Brothers of Italy (a right-wing split of The People of Freedom, formed mainly by former members of National Alliance); the Five Star Movement founded by Beppe Grillo; and a new centrist coalition around the outgoing Prime Minister Mario Monti with the Civic Choice party. In November 2013, the national council of The People of Freedom, at the behest of Berlusconi, suspended all party activities, to relaunch Forza Italia, which would experience multiple splits. In the 2018 Italian general election, the major groupings were reduced to three: the centre-right coalition, composed of Lega (Lega Nord's evolution on a countrywide scale), Forza Italia, Brothers of Italy, and minor allies; the Five Star Movement (which was the single most voted party); and the centre-left coalition, composed of the Democratic Party and minor allies. The centre-right coalition won a full majority in the 2022 Italian general election, leading to a government led by Brothers of Italy's leader Giorgia Meloni (the first since 2008 to be formed by a coalition of parties having fought the election together), while the opposition was fragmented in three segments: the Democratic Party-led centre-left coalition; the Five Star Movement; and a centrist alliance between Action and Italia Viva (both splinter groups of the Democratic Party).

== Active parties ==
=== Parties represented in the Italian or European Parliament ===
Party	Est.	Ideology	Leader	Deputies	Senators	MEPs	Associate parties
Brothers of Italy; Fratelli d'Italia	2012	National conservatism; Right-wing populism	Giorgia Meloni	118 / 400	66 / 200	24 / 76	DCR
Democratic Party; Partito Democratico	2007	Social democracy	Elly Schlein	68 / 400	36 / 200	19 / 76	DemoS; CpE
Lega (Note: In 2020 the Lega politically replaced the Lega Nord, a federalist party established in 1991 and still legally active. The Lega is a confederal party, composed of 22 territorial divisions, some of which were autonomous parties before joining the Lega Nord: Liga Veneta, Lega Lombarda, Lega Piemonte, Lega Vallée d'Aoste, Lega Trentino, Lega Alto Adige Südtirol, Lega Friuli-Venezia Giulia, Lega Emilia, Lega Romagna, Lega Liguria, Lega Toscana, Lega Marche, Lega Umbria, Lega Lazio, Lega Molise, Lega Campania, Lega Puglia, Lega Basilicata, Lega Calabria, Lega Sicilia and Lega Sardegna. The southern divisions of the party were originally organized into Us with Salvini in 2014 and later incorporated into the Lega in 2018.)	2017	Right-wing populism; Conservatism	Matteo Salvini	57 / 400	29 / 200	7 / 76	AF
Five Star Movement; Movimento 5 Stelle	2009	Populism; Green politics	Giuseppe Conte	48 / 400	26 / 200	8 / 76	
Forza Italia	2013	Liberal conservatism; Christian democracy	Antonio Tajani	52 / 400	19 / 200	8 / 76	NPSI; DC
Italia Viva	2019	Liberalism	Matteo Renzi	7 / 400	8 / 200	0 / 76	
Action; Azione	2019	Liberalism	Carlo Calenda	10 / 400	2 / 200	1 / 76	
National Future; Futuro Nazionale	2026	Ultranationalism; Ultraconservatism	Roberto Vannacci	9 / 400	0 / 200	1 / 76	
Us Moderates; Noi Moderati	2022	Liberal conservatism; Christian democracy	Maurizio Lupi	7 / 400	3 / 200	0 / 76	CP; MAIE; MA
Green Europe; Europa Verde	2021	Green politics	Angelo Bonelli	5 / 400 (Note: Within Greens and Left Alliance)	1 / 200	2 / 76	Verdi–Grüne–Vërc
Italian Left; Sinistra Italiana	2017	Democratic socialism; Eco-socialism	Nicola Fratoianni	4 / 400	2 / 200	2 / 76	
South Tyrolean People's Party (Note: Active only in South Tyrol); Südtiroler Volkspartei	1945	Regionalism; German-speakers' interests	Dieter Steger	3 / 400	2 / 200	1 / 76	
More Europe +Europa	2017	Liberalism; Pro-Europeanism	Riccardo Magi	2 / 400	0 / 200	0 / 76	RI; FE
Coraggio Italia	2021	Liberal conservatism	Luigi Brugnaro	1 / 400	1 / 200	0 / 76	
Union of the Centre; Unione di Centro	2002	Christian democracy; Social conservatism	Lorenzo Cesa	1 / 400	1 / 200	0 / 76	
Democratic Centre; Centro Democratico	2012	Christian left; Social liberalism	Bruno Tabacci	1 / 400	0 / 200	0 / 76	
Liberal Democratic Party; Partito Liberaldemocratico	2025	Liberalism	Luigi Marattin	1 / 400	0 / 200	0 / 76	
Progressive Party (Note: Active only in Sardinia); Partito Progressista	2017	Progressivism	Massimo Zedda	1 / 400	0 / 200	0 / 76	
South calls North; Sud chiama Nord	2022	Regionalism; Populism	Cateno De Luca	1 / 400	0 / 200	0 / 76	
Valdostan Union (Note: Active only in Aosta Valley); Union Valdôtaine	1945	Regionalism; Francophone interests	Joël Farcoz	1 / 400	0 / 200	0 / 76	
Campobase (Note: Active only in Trentino)	2022	Regionalism	Chiara Maule	0 / 400	1 / 200	0 / 76	
Public Space; Spazio Pubblico	2026	Liberalism	Pina Picierno	0 / 400	0 / 200	1 / 76	

=== Parties represented within other parties in the Italian or European Parliament ===
Party	Est.	Ideology	Leader	Deputies	Senators	MEPs	Affiliation
Associative Movement of Italians Abroad; Movimento Associativo Italiani all'Estero	2008	Italians abroad interests	Ricardo Antonio Merlo	1 / 400	1 / 200	0 / 76	NM
Cantiere Popolare (Note: Active only in Sicily)	2012	Christian democracy; Regionalism	Francesco Saverio Romano	1 / 400	0 / 200	0 / 76	NM
Christian Democracy with Rotondi; Democrazia Cristiana con Rotondi	2023	Christian democracy	Gianfranco Rotondi	1 / 400	0 / 200	0 / 76	FdI
Solidary Democracy; Democrazia Solidale	2014	Christian left	Paolo Ciani	1 / 400	0 / 200	0 / 76	PD
Animalist Movement; Movimento Animalista	2017	Animal rights	Michela Vittoria Brambilla	1 / 400	0 / 200	0 / 76	NM
New Italian Socialist Party; Nuovo Partito Socialista Italiano	2001	Social democracy; Liberalism	Stefano Caldoro	1 / 400	0 / 200	0 / 76	FI
Italian Radicals; Radicali Italiani	2001	Liberalism; Libertarianism	Matteo Hallissey	1 / 400	0 / 200	0 / 76	+E
Fassa Association (Note: Active only in Fassa Valley, Trentino); Associazione Fassa	2008	Ladin-speakers' interests; Christian democracy	Luca Guglielmi	0 / 400	1 / 200	0 / 76	Lega
Centrists for Europe; Centristi per l'Europa	2017	Christian democracy; Pro-Europeanism	Pier Ferdinando Casini	0 / 400	1 / 200	0 / 76	PD
Christian Democracy; Democrazia Cristiana	2023	Christian democracy	Raffaele De Rosa	0 / 400	1 / 200	0 / 76	FI
Greens (Note: Active only in South Tyrol); Verdi–Grüne–Vërc	1978	Green politics	Elide Mussner; Luca Bertolini	0 / 400	1 / 200	0 / 76	EV

=== Parties represented only in Regional Councils ===
==== Countrywide parties ====
Party	Founded	Ideology	Leader	Regional Council
Italian Socialist Party; Partito Socialista Italiano	2007	Social democracy	Enzo Maraio	Apulia; Basilicata; Campania; Sardinia
Us of the Centre; Noi di Centro	2021	Christian democracy	Clemente Mastella	Campania
Popular Base; Base Popolare	2023	Christian democracy Liberal conservatism	Giuseppe De Mita	Molise
New CDU – United Christian Democrats; Nuovo CDU – Cristiani Democratici Uniti	2014	Christian democracy	Mario Tassone	Campania
Italian Democratic Socialist Party; Partito Socialista Democratico Italiano	2004	Social democracy Social liberalism	Paolo Preti	Campania
Possible; Possibile	2015	Social democracy Green politics	Francesca Druetti	Piedmont
Vita	2022	Populism; Anti-establishment	Sara Cunial	Trentino-Alto Adige
Volt	2018	Social liberalism Pro-Europeanism	Guido Silvestri; Daniela Patti	Campania

==== Regional parties ====
Party	Founded	Ideology	Leader	Regional Council
Civic Network; Rete Civica	2019	Regionalism	Elio Riccarand	Aosta Valley
Edelweiss; Stella Alpina	2001	Regionalism; Christian democracy	Ronny Bobey	Aosta Valley
For Autonomy; Pour l'Autonomie	2020	Regionalism; Francophone interests	Aldo Di Marco	Aosta Valley
The Valdostan Renaissance; La Renaissance Valdôtaine	2020	Regionalism; Autonomism	Giovanni Girardini	Aosta Valley
Valdostan Rally; Rassemblement Valdôtain	2023	Regionalism; Conservatism	Stefano Aggravi	Aosta Valley
Moderates; Moderati	2005	Liberalism	Giacomo Portas	Piedmont
Autonomy House; Casa Autonomia	2022	Regionalism; Christian democracy	Paola Demagri	Trentino-Alto Adige
Die Freiheitlichen	1992	Separatism; German-speakers' interests	Dietmar Zwerger	Trentino-Alto Adige
For South Tyrol with Widmann; Für Südtirol mit Widmann	2023	Regionalism; Christian democracy	Thomas Widmann	Trentino-Alto Adige
JWA List; JWA Liste	2023	Right-wing populism Separatism	Jürgen Wirth Anderlan	Trentino-Alto Adige
The Civic List (South Tyrol); La Civica	2023	Regionalism; Liberalism	Angelo Gennaccaro	Trentino-Alto Adige
The Civic List (Trentino); La Civica	2019	Regionalism; Christian democracy	Mattia Gottardi	Trentino-Alto Adige
South Tyrolean Freedom; Süd-Tiroler Freiheit	2007	Separatism; German-speakers' interests	Eva Klotz	Trentino-Alto Adige
Team K	2018	Regionalism; Liberalism	Paul Köllensperger	Trentino-Alto Adige
Trentino Tyrolean Autonomist Party; Partito Autonomista Trentino Tirolese	1988	Regionalism; Christian democracy	Simone Marchiori	Trentino-Alto Adige
Liga Veneta Repubblica	1998	Regionalism; Venetian nationalism	Fabrizio Comencini	Veneto
Resist Veneto; Resistere Veneto	2025	Regionalism; Venetian nationalism	Riccardo Szumski	Veneto
Venetian Independence; Indipendenza Veneta	2012	Venetian nationalism	Alessio Morosin	Veneto
Pact for Autonomy; Patto per l'Autonomia	2015	Regionalism	Sergio Cecotti	Friuli-Venezia Giulia
Slovene Union; Slovenska Skupnost	1963	Slovene-speakers' interests	Peter Močnik	Friuli-Venezia Giulia
Building Democracy; Costruire Democrazia	2009	Regionalism	Massimo Romano	Molise
ControCorrente	2025	Regionalism; Anti-establishment	Ismaele La Vardera	Sicily
Christian Democracy Sicily; Democrazia Cristiana Sicilia	2020	Christian democracy	Salvatore Cuffaro	Sicily
Future Sicily; Sicilia Futura	2015	Regionalism	Salvatore Cardinale	Sicily
Movement for Autonomy; Movimento per l'Autonomia	2005	Regionalism; Christian democracy	Raffaele Lombardo	Sicily
Future Left; Sinistra Futura	2023	Regionalism; Democratic socialism	Luca Pizzuto	Sardinia
Sardinia 20Twenty; Sardegna 20Venti	2013	Regionalism	Stefano Tunis	Sardinia
Sardinia Alliance; Alleanza Sardegna	2023	Regionalism; Liberalism	Gerolamo Solina	Sardinia
Sardinian Reformers; Riformatori Sardi	1993	Regionalism; Liberal conservatism	Michele Cossa	Sardinia
Shared Horizon; Orizzonte Comune	2023	Regionalism	Franco Cuccureddu	Sardinia

=== Non-represented parties ===
==== Countrywide parties ====
- 10 Times Better (est. 2017)
- 3V Movement (est. 2019)
- Anticapitalist Left (est. 2013)
- August 24th Movement (est. 2019)
- Capybara Party (est. 2026)
- CARC Party (est. 1992)
- CasaPound (est. 2003)
- Christian Democracy (est. 2002)
- Christian Democracy (est. 2004)
- Christian Democracy (est. 2012)
- Civic Project Italy (est. 2025)
- Communist Alternative Party (est. 2007)
- Communist Front (est. 2021)
- Communist Party (est. 2009)
- Communist Party of Popular Unity (est. 2026)
- Communist Refoundation Party (est. 1991)
- Europeanists (est. 2021)
- Fascism and Freedom Movement (est. 1991)
- Fatherland and Constitution (est. 2018)
- Gay Party (est. 2020)
- Green Front (est. 2006)
- Humanist Party (est. 1984)
- I Change (est. 2013)
- Italexit (est. 2020)
- Italian Animalist Party (est. 2006)
- Italian Communist Party (est. 2016)
- Italian Liberal Party (est. 1997)
- Italian Liberal Right (est. 2019)
- Italian Marxist–Leninist Party (est. 1977)
- Italian Pirate Party (est. 2006)
- Italian Republican Party (est. 1895)
- Italy of Values (est. 1998)
- Italy Tomorrow (est. 2026)
- L'Italia c'è (est. 2022)
- Liberal Democrats (est. 2007)
- Marxist–Leninist Italian Communist Party (est. 1999)
- National Front (est. 1997)
- New Force (est. 1997)
- New Italian Social Movement (est. 2000)
- New Times – United Populars (est. 2023)
- No Euro Movement (est. 2003)
- Ora! (est. 2025)
- Pensioners' Party (est. 1989)
- Plus One (est. 2025)
- Popular Alternative (est. 2017)
- Power to the People (est. 2018)
- Renaissance (est. 2017)
- Risorgimento Socialista (est. 2015)
- Royal Italy (est. 1972)
- Social Democracy (est. 2022)
- Social Democratic Rebirth (est. 1996)
- Social Idea Movement (est. 2004)
- Sovereign Popular Democracy (est. 2023)
- The People of the Family (est. 2016)
- Together (est. 2020)
- Tricolour Flame (est. 1995)
- United Right (est. 2014)
- Workers' Communist Party (est. 2006)

==== Regional and local parties ====
- Autonomy South (est. 2012) (Note: Active only in the Southern Italy)
- Christian Popular Union (est. 2009) (Note: Active only in Sardinia)
- Citizens (est. 2003) (Note: Active only in Friuli-Venezia Giulia)
- Democracy and Autonomy (est. 2015) (Note: Active only in Campania)
- Democratic Area – Autonomist Left (est. 2018) (Note: Active only in Aosta Valley)
- Environment Rights Equality (est. 2019)
- Esprì (est. 2022)
- Fortza Paris (est. 2004)
- Free Sicilians (est. 2016) (Note: Active only in Sicily)
- Friulian Autonomist Movement (est. 2008)
- Friulian Front (est. 2006)
- Friuli Movement (est. 1966)
- Future Aosta Valley (est. 2020)
- Greens Greens (est. 1991) (Note: Active only in Piedmont)
- Independence Republic of Sardinia (est. 2002)
- Ladin Autonomist Union (est. 1983) (Note: Active only in Trentino)
- Lega Lombardo Veneta (est. 2008) (Note: Active only in the Northern Italy)
- Lega Sud Ausonia (est. 1996)
- Loyal to Trentino (est. 2003)
- Movement for the Autonomy of Romagna (est. 1990) (Note: Active only in Romagna)
- Party of Sardinians (est. 2013)
- Party of the South (est. 2007)
- Party of Venetians (est. 2019) (Note: Active only in Veneto)
- People's Centre (est. 1998)
- Political Action (est. 2017) (Note: Active only in Abruzzo)
- Popular Apulia (est. 2017) (Note: Active only in Apulia)
- Pro Lombardy Independence (est. 2011) (Note: Active only in Lombardy)
- Project Republic of Sardinia (est. 2011)
- Red Moors (est. 2009)
- Rhaetian Populars (est. 1997) (Note: Active only in the province of Sondrio)
- Sardinia Free Zone Movement (est. 2012)
- Sardinia Project (est. 2003)
- Sardinian Action Party (est. 1921)
- Sardigna Natzione Indipendentzia (est. 1994)
- Schittulli Political Movement (est. 2009)
- Sicilia Vera (est. 2007)
- Sicilian National Front (est. 1964)
- Sicilian Socialist Party (est. 2013)
- Southern Action League (est. 1992)
- Sovereign Aosta Country (est. 2014)
- The Base (est. 2010)
- The DemoKRats (est. 2009) (Note: Active only in Calabria)
- The Other South (est. 2008)
- Tuscan Autonomist Movement (est. 1989) (Note: Active only in Tuscany)
- Union of Sardinians (est. 1998)
- Unitalia (est. 1996) (Note: Active only in South Tyrol)
- United Populars (est. 2008) (Note: Active only in Basilicata)
- We Sicilians (est. 1994)
- We the South (est. 2010)

==== Overseas parties ====
- South American Union of Italian Emigrants (est. 2006)

== Defunct parties ==
=== Defunct parties represented in the Italian or European Parliament ===
==== Countrywide parties ====
- Moderate Party (1848–1861)
- Dissident Left (1877–1887)
- Historical Far Left (1867–1904)
- Historical Left (1849–1913)
- Historical Right (1849–1913)
- Italian Catholic Electoral Union (1906–1919)
- Italian Constitutional Democratic Party (1913–1919)
- Conservative Catholics (1913–1919)
- Democratic Party (1913–1919)
- Fasci Italiani di Combattimento (1919–1921)
- Italian Radical Party (1904–1922)
- Liberals (1913–1922)
- Italian Nationalist Association (1910–1923)
- Combatants' Party (1919–1923)
- Economic Party (1919–1924)
- Unitary Socialist Party (1922–1925)
- Italian Reformist Socialist Party (1912–1926)
- Italian People's Party (1919–1926)
- Italian Democratic Liberal Party (1921–1926)
- Social Democracy (1922–1926)
- National Fasces (1924–1926)
- National Fascist Party (1921–1943)
- Republican Democratic Concentration (1946)
- Action Party (1929–1947)
- Italian Democratic Party (1944–1947)
- Labour Democratic Party (1943–1948)
- Social Christian Party (1943–1948)
- Italian Unionist Movement (1944–1948)
- Common Man's Front (1946–1949)
- Movement for the Independence of Sicily (1943–1951)
- Unitary Socialist Party (1949–1951)
- National Democratic Alliance (1953–1954)
- Monarchist National Party (1946–1959)
- People's Monarchist Party (1954–1959)
- Peasants' Party of Italy (1920–1963)
- Unified Socialist Party (1966–1969)
- Italian Democratic Party of Monarchist Unity (1959–1972)
- Italian Socialist Party of Proletarian Unity (1964–1972)
- National Democracy (1977–1979)
- Proletarian Unity Party (1972–1984)
- Radical Party (1955–1989)
- Federation of Green Lists (1986–1990)
- Rainbow Greens (1989–1990)
- Italian Communist Party (1921–1991)
- Proletarian Democracy (1978–1991)
- Italian Socialist Party (1892–1994)
- Italian Liberal Party (1922–1994)
- Christian Democracy (1943–1994)
- Liberal Democratic Pole (1994)
- Italian Social Movement (1946–1995)
- Socialist Rebirth (1993–1995)
- Federalists and Liberal Democrats (1994–1996)
- Federalist Italian League (1995–1996)
- Democratic Alliance (1993–1997)
- Italian Democratic Socialist Party (1947–1998)
- Democratic Party of the Left (1991–1998)
- Union of the Centre (1993–1998)
- Social Christians (1993–1998)
- Republican Left (1994–1998)
- Labour Federation (1994–1998)
- Italian Socialists (1994–1998)
- Movement of Unitarian Communists (1995–1998)
- Christian Democrats for the Republic (1998)
- The Network (1991–1999)
- Pannella List (1992–1999)
- Democratic Union (1996–1999)
- Democratic Union for the Republic (1998–1999)
- Christian Democrats for Freedom (1998–2001)
- Union for the Republic (1999–2001)
- Italian People's Party (1994–2002)
- Christian Democratic Centre (1994–2002)
- United Christian Democrats (1995–2002)
- Italian Renewal (1996–2002)
- The Democrats (1999–2002)
- European Democracy (2001–2002)
- Segni Pact (1993–2003)
- Bonino List (1999–2004)
- Autonomists for Europe (2000–c.2005)
- Democrats of the Left (1998–2007)
- Italian Democratic Socialists (1998–2007)
- Democracy is Freedom – The Daisy (2002–2007)
- Middle Italy (2006–2007)
- Federalist Party (1994–2008)
- Forza Italia (1994–2009)
- National Alliance (1995–2009)
- Social Action (2003–2009)
- Christian Democracy for Autonomies (2005–2009)
- Italians in the World (2006–2009)
- Liberal Populars (2008–2009)
- Democratic Left (2007–2010)
- Unite the Left (2008–2010)
- Force of the South (2010–2011)
- Popular Action (2010–2012)
- The Populars of Italy Tomorrow (2010–2012)
- Rights and Freedom (2012)
- Union of Democrats for Europe (1999–2013)
- Critical Left (2007–2013)
- Federation of Christian Populars (2008–2013)
- The People of Freedom (2009–2013)
- Movement of National Responsibility (2010–2013)
- Popular Agreement (2012–2013)
- Great South (2011–2013)
- Party of Italian Communists (1998–2014)
- I Love Italy (2008–2014)
- Future and Freedom (2011–2015)
- Italy Work in Progress (2014–2015)
- Alliance for Italy (2009–2016)
- Left Ecology Freedom (2010–2016)
- Conservatives and Social Reformers (2012–2016)
- The Right (2007–2017)
- New Centre-Right (2013–2017)
- Conservatives and Reformists (2015–2017)
- Liberal Popular Alliance (2015–2018)
- Civic Area (2017–2018)
- Civic Choice (2013–2019)
- Free Alternative (2015–2019)
- Direction Italy (2017–2019)
- Energies for Italy (2016–2020)
- Federation of the Greens (1990–2021)
- X Movement (2014–2021)
- Alliance of the Centre (2008–2022)
- Act! (2015–2022)
- Italia in Comune (2018–2022)
- Cambiamo! (2019–2022)
- Together for the Future (2022)
- Green Italia (2013–2023)
- Identity and Action (2015–2023)
- Article One (2017–2023)
- Us with Italy (2017–2023)
- èViva (2019–2023)
- Green is Popular (2021–2023)
- Italy in the Centre (2022–2023)
- Populars Europeanists Reformers (2023–2024)
- Populars for Italy (2014–2025)
- Alternativa (2021–2025)
- European Republicans Movement (2001–2026)

==== Regional and local parties ====
- Deutscher Verband (1919–1926) (Note: Active only in South Tyrol)
- Lega Alpina Lumbarda (1992–1996) (Note: Active only in Lombardy)
- List for Trieste (1978–2006) (Note: Active only in the province of Trieste)
- Lega per l'Autonomia – Alleanza Lombarda (1996–2008)
- Democratic Republicans (2004–2010) (Note: Active only in Campania)
- I the South (2009–2016) (Note: Active only in the Southern Italy)
- Us with Salvini (2014–2018)
- Unidos (2013–2020) (Note: Active only in Sardinia)
- Union for Trentino (2008–2022) (Note: Active only in Trentino)
- Diventerà Bellissima (2014–2022) (Note: Active only in Sicily)
- Responsible Autonomy (2013–2023) (Note: Active only in Friuli-Venezia Giulia)

==== Overseas parties ====
- Independent Alternative for Italians Abroad (2005–c.2006)
- For Italy in the World (2006)
- Italian Associations in South America (2005–c.2008)

=== Defunct parties represented only in Regional Councils ===
Countrywide parties

- Socialist Party (1996–2001)
- The Liberals Sgarbi (1999–c.2007)
- Bonino-Pannella List (2009–2012)
- Christian Democratic Party (2000–2013)
- Reality Italy (2013–2018)

Aosta Valley

- Valdostan Rally (1963–1977)
- Popular Democrats (1972–1984)
- Progressive Valdostan Union (1973–1984)
- Independent Autonomists (1991–1993)
- Progressive Democratic Autonomists (1984–1998)
- Autonomist People's Alliance (1992–1998)
- For Aosta Valley (1993–1998)
- Autonomists (1997–2001)
- Alé Vallée (2003–2007)
- Rainbow Aosta Valley (2003–2010)
- Vallée d'Aoste Vive (2005–2010)
- Valdostan Renewal (2006–2010)
- Alternative Greens (1990–2010)
- Autonomist Federation (1998–2014)
- Valdostan Autonomist Popular Edelweiss (2017–2018)
- Autonomy Liberty Participation Ecology (2010–2019)
- Progressive Valdostan Union (2013–2019)
- Civic Commitment (2018–2019)
- For Our Valley (2016–c.2020)
- Mouv' (2017–2024)
- Valdostan Alliance (2019–2024)

Piedmont

- Piedmontese Union (1981–1992)
- Progett'Azione (2012–2014)

Lombardy

- Lega Nuova (1991–1992)
- Alleanza Lombarda Autonomia (1989–1996)

Trentino-Alto Adige

- Craftsman-Farmer Alliance (1964–1968) (Note: Active only in Trentino)
- Tyrolean Homeland Party (1964–1968) (Note: Active only in South Tyrol)
- Social Progressive Party of South Tyrol (1966–1978)
- Social Democratic Party of South Tyrol (1972–1983)
- New Left (1978–1983)
- Trentino Tyrolean People's Party (1948–1982)
- Party of Independents (1972–1987)
- Trentino Tyrolean Autonomist Union (1982–1988)
- Integral Autonomy (1982–1988)
- South Tyrolean Homeland Federation (1974–1989)
- Freedom Party of South Tyrol (1987–1989)
- Lega Autonomia Trentino (1993–1996)
- Trentino Tomorrow (1998–2003)
- Democratic Union of Alto Adige (1993–2008)
- Daisy Civic List (1998–2008)
- United Valleys (2006–2008)
- Ladins Dolomites (1993–2010s)
- Democratic Party of South Tyrol (1997–2010s)
- Administer Trentino (2008–2018)
- Team Autonomies (2013–2018)
- Trentino Civic List (2013–2019)
- Citizens' Union for South Tyrol (1989–2020)
- Alto Adige in the Heart (2013–2020)
- Act for Trentino (2016–2020)
- Popular Autonomists (2017–2023)
- Futura Trentino (2018–2024)
- Trentino Project (2012–2025)

Veneto

- Union of the Venetian People (1987–1995)
- Lega Autonomia Veneta (1989–2000)
- Veneto for the EPP (2005–c.2009)
- North-East Union (1996–2010s)
- Party of Venetians (2010)
- Toward North (2010–2012)
- Community Democratic League (2011–2012)
- North-East Project (2004–2015)
- Independence We Veneto (2014–2017)
- Tosi List for Veneto (2015–2022)

Friuli-Venezia Giulia

- Lega Autonomia Friuli (1993–1990s)
- Reformist Popular Centre (1998–2003)
- FVG Project (2017–2023)

Marche

- Marche 2020 (2014–2015)

Lazio

- Cuoritaliani (2015–2018)

Molise

- Progressive People's Party (1993–2000s)

Campania

- Democratic Populars (2008–2010)
- Forza Campania (2014)
- Italy Is Popular (2017–2021)

Apulia

- Apulia First of All (2005–2015)
- Moderates and Populars (2010–c.2015)

Calabria

- Southern Democratic Party (2006–2007)
- Autonomy and Rights (2010–2014)
- Io Resto in Calabria (2010–2021)

Sicily

- Social Christian Sicilian Union (1958–1963)
- Liberal Socialists (1998–2003)
- Sicilian Spring (2001–2000s)
- New Sicily (2001–2008)
- Sicilian Alliance (2005–2008)
- Autonomist Democrats (2008–2009)
- Sicilian People's Movement (2012)
- Reformist Democrats for Sicily (2013–2014)
- Article Four (2013–2014)
- Pact of Democrats for Reforms (2014–2015)
- Democratic Sicily (2014–2015)
- The Megaphone – Crocetta List (2012–2017)
- Party of Sicilians (2012–2017)
- Centrists for Sicily (2016–2017)
- Now Sicily (2019–2022)

Sardinia

- Sardinian Socialist Action Party (1948–1949)
- New Movement (1997–2002)
- Sardinian People's Party (2000–2004)
- Democratic Federation (1994–2007)
- Civic Sardinia (2018–2023)

=== Defunct non-represented parties ===
==== Countrywide parties ====
- Action Party (1853–1867)
- Italian Workers' Party (1882–1892)
- Italian Revolutionary Socialist Party (1881–1893)
- Futurist Political Party (1918–1920)
- Maximalist Italian Socialist Party (1932–c.1945)
- Party of the Christian Left (1939–1945)
- Republican Fascist Party (1943–1945)
- Democratic Fascist Party (1945–1946)
- Union of Socialists (1947–1949)
- Internationalist Communist Party (1943–?)
- Italian Nettist Party (1953)
- Independent Socialist Union (1953–1957)
- Popular Unity (1953–1957)
- Workers' Political Movement (1971–1972)
- Italian (Marxist–Leninist) Communist Party (1968–1978)
- Democratic Union for the New Republic (1964–1980)
- Radical Federative Movement (1982–1985)
- Pensioners' National Party (1979–c.1990)
- Communist Party of Italy (Marxist–Leninist) (1963–1991)
- Populars for Reform (1992–1993)
- Liberal Socialist Movement (1994–1996)
- Reformist Socialist Party (1994–1996)
- European Liberal Social Democracy (1994–1996)
- Federal Italy (1996–1998)
- Democratic Italy (1994–2000)
- Socialist League (2000–2001)
- Federalist Greens (1992–c.2006)
- Pact of Liberal Democrats (2003–2006)
- United Democratic Christians (2005–2008)
- Third Pole (2006–2008)
- The Italian Socialists (2006–2009)
- Movement for Italy (2008–2010)
- Movement for the Left (2009–2010)
- United Pensioners (2000–?)
- Popular Rebirth (2006–2010s)
- United Socialists (2009–2011)
- Extended Christian Pact (1994–2012)
- S.O.S. Italy (1996–c.2012)
- Rebirth of Christian Democracy (2000–2012)
- Amnesty Justice Freedom List (2012–2013)
- Federation of Liberals (1994–c.2014)
- The Rose for Italy (2008–c.2014)
- Act to Stop the Decline (2012–2014)
- Love Party (1991–c.2015)
- Italy First (2013–2015)
- Communist Party of Italy (2014–2016)
- Unique Italy (2014–2016)
- Democratic Union for Consumers (2007–2017)
- National Action (2015–2017)
- Progressive Camp (2017)
- Moderates in Revolution (2012–2018)
- Christian Revolution (2015–2018)
- Progressive Area (2017–2018)
- National Movement for Sovereignty (2017–2019)
- Liberal Democratic Alliance for Italy (2013–2023)
- Social Right (2013–2023)
- Good Right (2020–2023)
- European Liberal Democrats (2023–2025)
- Atheist Democracy (2009–2026)
- Independence (2023–2026)

==== Regional and local parties ====
- Communist Party of Sardinia (1943–1944) (Note: Active only in Sardinia)
- Movement for Piedmontese Regional Autonomy (1955–1960s) (Note: Active only in Piedmont)
- Bergamasque Autonomist Movement (1955–1960) (Note: Active only in the province of Bergamo)
- Movement for the Independence of the Free Territory of Trieste (1958–1980s) (Note: Active only in the province of Trieste)
- Liga Veneta Serenissima (1984–1987) (Note: Active only in Veneto)
- Ossolan Union for Autonomy (1977–1990) (Note: Active only in the Ossola Valley)
- Independentist Sardinian Party (1984–1994)
- Union of the Venetian People (1987–1995)
- North-East Movement (1997–c.1999)
- Veneto Autonomous Region Movement (1987–2000)
- Fronte Marco Polo (1999–2001)
- Mancini List (1994–2005) (Note: Active only in Calabria)
- Populars' Coordination (2008–?) (Note: Active only in Campania)
- Sardinian Autonomist Populars (2008–2009)
- Venetians Movement (2006–2010)
- Venetian People's Movement (2008–2010s)
- Venetian National Party (2007–2011)
- Community Democratic League (2011–2012)
- Padanian Union (2011–2013) (Note: Active only in Lombardy)
- A Manca pro s'Indipendèntzia (2004–2015)
- Veneto State (2010–2016)
- Sicily Nation (2015–2017) (Note: Active only in Sicily)
- Venetian Left (2015–2017)
- We Are Veneto (2016–2019)
- Great North (2017–2025) (Note: Active only in the Northern Italy)

== See also ==
- List of parliamentary groups in Italy
- List of political coalitions in Italy
- List of political parties by region
- Table of political parties in Europe by pancontinental organisation
