= Us with Salvini =

Us with Salvini Noi con Salvini
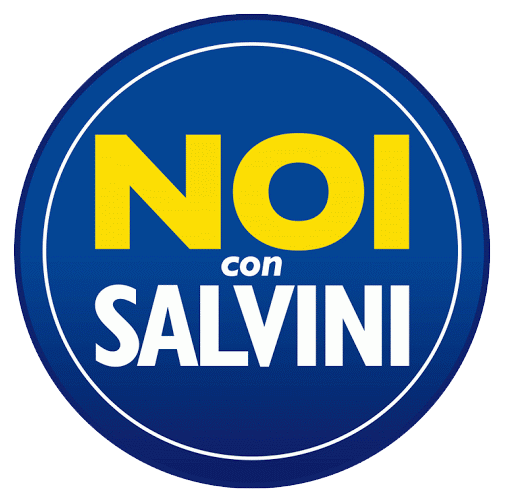
- Abbreviation: NcS
- President: Matteo Salvini
- Deputy President: Raffaele Volpi
- Secretary: Angelo Attaguile
- Founded: 19 December 2014
- Dissolved: 2018
- Merged into: Lega per Salvini Premier
- Headquarters: Via Federico Cesi 44, 00193 Rome
- Ideology: Right-wing populism Regionalism; Federalism
- Political position: Right-wing
- National affiliation: Centre-right coalition
- Northern counterpart: Lega Nord
- Colours: Blue

Party flag

Us with Salvini (Italian: Noi con Salvini, NcS) was a populist political party in Italy. The party, founded by Matteo Salvini on 19 December 2014, was the sister party of Lega Nord (LN) for southern Italy, Lazio, and Sardinia (where the LN regional section was never recognised as one of its "national" sections, and where the party joined forces with the Sardinian Action Party, PSd'Az).

Salvini was the party's president, Raffaele Volpi (a senator of LN) vice-president, while Angelo Attaguile, formerly a member of the Party of Sicilians, who was the first deputy to join the party, secretary and leader in Sicily.

In the 2018 general election, NcS ran under the "Lega" umbrella alongside Lega Nord, the aforementioned PSd'Az and minor parties. More than 20 deputies and senators were elected outside the Centre-North. As of early 2019, the party seems no longer active. Since 2018, membership recruitment by the LN in the central and southern Italy has been made under the name of "Lega per Salvini Premier" (LSP), which practically supplanted NcS.

Before NcS, there were previous attempts to establish a LN-sponsored party in the South: "Lega Italia Federale", Lega Sud Ausonia (which is still active and espouses an anti-northern line), and the Federalist Alliance.

== History ==
Soon after the 2014 European Parliament election, held in May, Matteo Salvini, federal secretary of Lega Nord (LN), proposed the creation of a sister party for the regions of Italy where the LN was not active.

On 19 December 2014 Salvini launched the new party during a press conference in Rome.

Since its early months of activity, NcS formed ties with several local activists and organisations, stretching from Souad Sbai, a former deputy of The People of Freedom (PdL) of Moroccan origin and leading anti-Islamist, to the Italian nationalist and neo-fascist organisation CasaPound. On 8 February 2015 Salvini and Attaguile, a deputy, launched the Sicilian section of the party in Palermo: in the event, he apologised for Lega Nord's past rhetoric towards the South.

On 27 February 2015, the LN and NcS organised a joint rally in Rome. Along with Salvini and Luca Zaia, speakers featured the representatives of some social/professional associations and trade unions (including Claudio Ardizio, a local leader of The Other Europe, a left-wing electoral coalition), the aforementioned Souad Sbai, the leader of New Italy Party and flat tax supporter Armando Siri, the president of Brothers of Italy (FdI) Giorgia Meloni and the deputy leader of CasaPound Simone Di Stefano, who spoke on behalf of the newly organised Sovereignty association. In November another rally took place in Bologna, that time with the participation of Forza Italia (FI) leader Silvio Berlusconi, along with Meloni. CasaPound/Sovereignty, which was not invited, disliked Salvini's "moderate" turn and deserted the rally. Both Salvini and CasaPound leaders confirmed that the two parties would no longer cooperate due to diverging views.

Seven deputies, including Attaguile, since joined the party: Barbara Saltamartini (ex-AN/PdL/NCD), Giuseppina Castiello (ex-AN/PdL/FI) Alessandro Pagano (ex-FI/PdL/NCD), Carmelo Lo Monte (ex-DC/PPI/DE/UdC/MpA/CD/PSI), Trifone Altieri (ex-FI/PdL/FI/CR/DI), and Roberto Marti (ex-FI/PdL/FI/CR/DI).

In April 2016 it was announced that Irene Pivetti, a former President of the Chamber of Deputies who had left the LN in 1996 and was then president of the Italy–China Development Foundation, would head the party's slate in the upcoming municipal election in Rome. In the 2016 local elections the LN did well in the Centre-North, especially in its stronghold Veneto, while the NcS obtained negligible results, including 2.7% in Rome.

In the 2017 local elections the NcS was present only in a few municipalities, obtaining some convincing results only in the Centre-South (closer to the areas of LN's influence), including 6.8% in L'Aquila (Abruzzo), 8.5% in Ladispoli, 6.6% in Guidonia Montecelio, 6.6% in Fonte Nuova and 3.0% in Cerveteri (Lazio), 3.3% in Mondragone (northern Campania), and occasionally 4.9% in Santeramo in Colle (Apulia).

In the 2018 general election the LN presented its list throughout Italy under the "Lega" banner (without the word "Nord"), obtaining its best results in Abruzzo (13.8%), Lazio (13.0%), Sardinia (10.8%) – where the list also featured candidates of the Sardinian Action Party – and Molise (8.7%). 17 deputies and 11 senators were elected in the Centre-South (among which the economist Alberto Bagnai, the well-known lawyer Giulia Bongiorno and the trade unionist Claudio Durigon), including one deputy and one senator of the LN (Filippo Maturi of Lega Nord Alto Adige – Südtirol in Lazio and Salvini in Calabria), one deputy and one senator of the Italian Liberal Party (Cinzia Bonfrisco and Giuseppe Basini, both northerners), one senator of the National Movement for Sovereignty (Claudio Barbaro) and one of the PSd'Az (Christian Solinas). The joint parliamentary groups were named "League–Salvini Premier" in the Chamber and "League–Salvini Premier–Sardinian Action Party" in the Senate.

The 2018 membership recruitment was made under the name of "Lega per Salvini Premier" (LSP), practically supplanting NcS. The LSP, whose statute had been published in the Gazzetta Ufficiale in December 2017 and had been described as a "parallel party", might eventually replace both the LN and NcS, which would be merged into one. Salvini might even launch a brand-new party and absorb most of the centre-right parties into it. According to the website of the Identity and Democracy Party, which lists both the LN (as "Lega") and the LSP as members, the latter is "a confederal political movement constituted in the form of an unrecognized association whose purpose is the peaceful transformation of the Italian state into a modern federal state through democratic and electoral methods".

== Ideology ==
The party's main campaign themes were Euroscepticism and a strong stance against illegal immigration. NcS embraced a very critical view of the European Union (EU), especially of the Euro, which Matteo Salvini once described a "crime against mankind". The party was also quite opposed to illegal immigration, which has emerged in 2012 as a serious problem for Italy, especially for the South.

On economic issues, NcS supported flat tax, tax cuts, fiscal federalism, protectionism and, to some extent, agrarianism. On social issues, NcS opposed same-sex marriage and the EU's management of immigration, while it supported family values and the legalisation of brothels. In foreign policy NcS opposed the international sanctions against Russia of 2014, and supported an economic opening to Eastern Europe and to countries of the Far East such as North Korea.

NcS's political positions were near to those of the French National Front and of the Dutch Party for Freedom.

== Leadership ==
- President: Matteo Salvini (2014–2018)
  - Vice President: Raffaele Volpi (2015–2018)
- Secretary: Angelo Attaguile (2015–2018)

== Electoral results ==
=== Regional Councils ===
Region	Election year	Votes	%	Seats	+/−
Apulia	2015	38,661 (11th)	2.3	0 / 51	–
Sicily	2017	108,713 (7th) (Note: In a joint list with FdI.)	5.7	1 / 70	▲1
