= Forza (disambiguation) =

Forza is a series of racing video games with two main sub-series: Forza Motorsport and Forza Horizon.

Forza may also refer to:

== People ==
- Robert Forza, an Australian actor
- Roberto Forza (born 1957), an Italian cinematographer

== Politics ==
- Forza Campania, defunct political party based in Campania
- Forza Europa, defunct centre-right European Parliament group
- Forza Europa (2017), liberal European Parliament group
- Forza Italia (1994), a defunct Italian political party
- Forza Italia (2013), an Italian political party
- Forza Italia Giovani, the youth wing of the party founded in 2013
- Forza Nazzjonali, defunct Maltese electoral force
- Forza! Nederland, a Dutch political party
- Forza Nuova, Italian neo-fascist party

== Transport ==
- Honda Forza, a 244 cc scooter
- Naza Forza, a car manufactured in Malaysia
- Dodge Forza, also called Fiat Siena
- Ducati Forza, a make of motorcycle
- ZAZ Forza, a localized version of the Chery A13 car produced in Ukraine

== Sport ==
- A.S.D. Forza e Coraggio, a football club from Italy
- Forza F.C., a football club from the Philippines
- Tallinna FC Forza, a football club from Estonia
- Forza Bastia, film about French club S.C. Bastia's 1978 UEFA Cup Final first leg tie against Dutch club PSV Eindhoven
- Forza Milan!, defunct Italian sports magazine dedicated to football club A.C. Milan

== Music ==
- Forza, short among music writers for La forza del destino, opera by Verdi
- "La Forza", song by Estonian singer Elina Nechayeva
- "Forza", song by Croatian rapper Grše
- Forza sempre, album by Brazilian singer Jerry Adriani
- Forza, album by Danish rapper Sivas

== Other uses ==
- Forza d'Agrò, town and commune in the Metropolitan City of Messina, Sicily
- "Forza", a deadly mist from "Cookie Jar (short story)" by Stephen King
- The Reluctant Magician (Il Mago per forza), Italian comedy film
- Forza Rossa, Ferrari's Romanian branch
- Forza! Hidemaru, Japanese football-related anime television series

== See also ==
- Laforza, an Italian sport utility vehicle
