= Federalists and Liberal Democrats =

Federalists and Liberal Democrats Federalisti e Liberaldemocratici
- Leader: Furio Gubetti; Raffaele Costa
- Founded: 16 December 1994
- Dissolved: 1996
- Succeeded by: Liberal Federalists
- Headquarters: Via Sacchi 30, Turin
- Ideology: Liberalism; Federalism; Christian democracy
- Political position: Centre-right

The Federalists and Liberal Democrats (Italian: Federalisti e Liberaldemocratici, FLD) was a liberal and federalist political party in Italy, founded in 1994 as a parliamentary group in the Chamber of Deputies.

The bulk of FLD was renamed Liberal Federalists (Federalisti Liberali, FL) in 1996.

== History ==
=== Foundation ===
The FLD was founded on 19 December 1994 as a parliamentary group within the Chamber of Deputies by twelve dissident members from the Northern League (LN), four members of Forza Italia (FI), two members of the Liberal Democratic Foundation (Alberto Michelini and Giuseppe Siciliani), Raffaele Costa (leader of the Union of the Centre and Minister of Health) and Pietro Cerullo (a member of the Southern Action League).

The group was launched in order to continue to support Silvio Berlusconi's government, which was would be brought down by Northern League leader Umberto Bossi three days after. A group of LN dissidents wanted to continue the alliance with FI. They included Franco Rocchetta (founder and long-standing leader of the Venetian League, LV), Marilena Marin (secretary of the LV from 1984 to 1994), Lucio Malan, Furio Gubetti and Gualberto Niccolini (president of the Northern League Tuscany from 1988).

In February 1995 Michelini left FLD and lead his party, the "Liberal Catholics", into FI.

=== Further organisation ===
On 31 May 1995 FLD's assembly approved a "programmatic political manifesto" through which the group structured itself. FLD, whose main ideologies were federalism and liberalism, aimed at transforming Italy into a federal presidential republic and the adoption of an electoral system based on first-past-the-post. Gubetti handed to Costa the role of party leader in the Chamber and took the formal leadership of the party.

In the same year FLD participated in some local elections together with the Federalist Italian League (formed by LN dissidents led by Sergio Cappelli) and the Federalist Union (launched by Gianfranco Miglio, formerly LN "ideologue") under the "Federalists" banner, in coalition with the Pole for Freedoms.

In July 1995 Gubetti left FLD to join FI, citing disagreements over FLD's slight distancing from the Pole.

=== Liberal Federalists ===
At the end of 1995 it was announced that the FLD would be transformed into a full-fledged political party, the Union for the New Republic (UNR); finally, in February 1996, the FLD leading members established the Liberal Federalists (FL). The new party, allied with the FI-led Pole, had the elephant as a symbol, referring to the Republican Party. Costa, Cerullo and Luigi Negri were respectively appointed secretary, president and coordinator of the new party. In the 1996 Italian general election (Chamber of Deputies) the FL obtained 6,475 votes (0.02%) among party lists (having fielded a list only in the Sicily 1 constituency) and 11,563 votes (0.03%) for first-past-the-post candidates (having fielded only three candidates in three constituencies of Sicily 1). However, some outgoing members were re-elected in first-past-the-post constituencies for the Pole and joined FI parliamentary groups: Costa, Negri, Malan, Gubbetti, Niccolini, Umberto Giovine, Paolo Mammola, Mario Masiero and Giuseppe Rossetto. During the 1995–2000 legislature of the Regional Council of Piedmont the FL had two members, who were also affiliated to National Alliance (AN).
