= Reformist Democrats for Sicily =

Reformist Democrats for Sicily (Italian: Democratici Riformisti per la Sicilia, DRS) was a regional centrist Italian political party active in Sicily. The "noble fathers" of the party were the former ministers Salvatore Cardinale and Salvo Andò.

The party, which functioned mainly as a group within the Sicilian Regional Assembly, was launched in January 2013 by eight regional deputies, coming from various parties: Alice Anselmo, Marcello Greco, Gianfranco Vullo and Salvatore Lo Giudice coming from the Movement for the Territory, Edi Tamajo and Riccardo Savona (coming from Great South), Giuseppe Picciolo (coming from the Party of Sicilians) and Marco Forzese (former Union of the Centre). The group supported Rosario Crocetta, the Democratic President of Sicily.

In 2014 the party joined the Pact of Democrats for Reforms.
