= Direction Italy =

Direction Italy Direzione Italia
- President: Raffaele Fitto
- Founded: 28 January 2017
- Dissolved: 29 October 2019
- Preceded by: Conservatives and Reformists
- Merged into: Brothers of Italy
- Headquarters: Corso Vittorio Emanuele II, 18; 00186 Rome
- Ideology: Conservatism; Liberal conservatism
- Political position: Centre-right
- National affiliation: Us with Italy (2017–2018); Brothers of Italy (2018–2019)
- European affiliation: Alliance of Conservatives and Reformists in Europe
- European Parliament group: European Conservatives and Reformists
- Colours: Blue

Website
- www.direzione-italia.it

Direction Italy (Italian: Direzione Italia, DI) was a liberal-conservative political party in Italy.

The party was led by Raffaele Fitto, an MEP in the European Conservatives and Reformists (ECR) group.

== History ==
The party was formed in January 2017 during a convention in Rome, which saw the participation of several parties, including Fitto's Conservatives and Reformists (CoR) – formed mainly by splinters from Forza Italia (FI), of which they formed the "Rebuilders" faction, in 2015 –, the Italian Liberal Party (PLI), the Friuli-Venezia Giulia-based Responsible Autonomy (AR), the Sardinian Reformers (RS) and Together for Molise (IpM). The aforementioned parties might retain some or all of their autonomy. In May 2017 the seven senators of DI joined the Great Autonomies and Freedom (GAL) group, composed primarily of minor centre-right parties, while the CoR sub-group in the Chamber maintained its name for some time.

In the 2017 local elections the party increased the CoR's vote in Apulia (Fitto's heartland), but failed to make inroads outside the region (1.1% in Padua, 1.2% in Alessandria, 2.2% in Rieti, etc.) and the party's Apulian most notable results were in Canosa di Puglia (20.2%), Lecce (17.5%), Casarano (13.5%), and Martina Franca (11.6%).

In June 2017 Fitto was unanimously re-elected president at the party's first national congress. In Parliament the party suffered the loss of Rocco Palese, leader in the Chamber and long-time ally of Fitto, who switched back to FI, while welcoming two splinters from the Civics and Innovators sub-group, Pierpaolo Vargiu (a member of the RS) and Salvatore Matarrese, both elected with Civic Choice (SC) in 2013. CoR's sub-group within the Chamber's Mixed Group was contextually renamed "Direction Italy" and Cosimo Latronico was selected as new sub-group leader. In July 2017 another deputy, Maurizio Bianconi, left the party. In November two deputies, Trifone Altieri and Roberto Marti, switched to Us with Salvini, while Renata Bueno of the South American Union Italian Emigrants joined just the sub-group.

In December 2017 DI was a founding member of Us with Italy (NcI), a pro-Silvio Berlusconi centrist electoral list within the centre-right coalition for the 2018 general election, along with SC, Act! (F!), splinters from Popular Alternative (AP – two groups, a liberal one led by Enrico Costa and a Christian-democratic one led by Maurizio Lupi), Cantiere Popolare (CP) and the Movement for the Autonomies (MpA). NcI was later enlarged to the Union of the Centre (UdC) and Identity and Action (IdeA), with the goal of reaching 3%, required to win seats from proportional lists under a new electoral law, but the list just won a 1.2% of the vote.

On 6 December 2018 Fitto announced a federative pact with Brothers of Italy, which it joins definitively on 29 October 2019.

== Leadership ==
- President: Raffaele Fitto (2017–2019)
- Party Leader in the Chamber of Deputies: Rocco Palese (2017), Cosimo Latronico (2017–2018)
- Party Leader in the Senate: Lucio Tarquinio (2017–2018)
- Party Leader in the European Parliament: Raffaele Fitto (2017–2019)
