= Article Four (political party) =

Article Four (Articolo Quattro, Art.4) was a regional centrist Italian political party active in Sicily.

The party, which functioned mainly as a group within the Sicilian Regional Assembly (ARS), was launched in July 2013 by a diverse bunch of regional deputies, led Nicola Leanza (former UDC and former MpA) and which included also Luca Sammartino, Salvatore Lentini, Valeria Sudano, Paolo Ruggirello and Raffaele Nicotra and Salvatore Cascio (from the Cantiere Popolare).

In November 2014 Leanza left the party and launched Democratic Sicily. Article Four was later merged into the Democratic Party.
