= Democratic Sicily =

Democratic Sicily Sicilia Democratica
- Secretary: Lino Leanza
- President: Stefano Cusumano
- Founded: 30 November 2014
- Dissolved: 2015
- Split from: Article Four
- Merged into: Future Sicily
- Headquarters: Palermo
- Ideology: Regionalism
- Political position: Centre

Democratic Sicily (Italian: Sicilia Democratica, SD) was a regional centrist Italian political party active in Sicily.

The party was launched in November 2014 by Nicola Leanza (elected on the UDC list), a long-time regional deputy, following a split from Article Four for internal disagreements during the formation of the 3rd Crocetta regional government.

The Democratic Sicily group in the ARS, as well as by Leanza, was joined by other five deputies: Totò Lentini (ex UDC), Giambattista Coltraro (ex Megaphone), Carmelo Currenti (ex Musumeci list), Luisa Lantieri (ex Great South) and Salvatore Cascio (ex PID).

In May 2015 Leanza died, leaving the future of the party quite uncertain.

In October 2015 it merged with part of Pact of Democrats for Reforms, into the new party Future Sicily.
