= Federalist Italian League =

Federalist Italian League Lega Italiana Federalista
- Federal Coordinator: Sergio Cappelli
- Founded: 1995
- Dissolved: 1996
- Split from: Northern League
- Ideology: Federalism; Liberalism
- Political position: Centre-right

The Federalist Italian League (Lega Italiana Federalista, LIF) was a short-lived federalist and liberal political party in Italy.

== History ==
The party was founded by dissident members of Northern League on 13 February 1995, including Luigi Negri (who had been secretary of Lombard League until 9 January), Enrico Hüllwech and Giorgio Vido. Sergio Cappelli was elected federal coordinator of the party during a founding convention in Genoa. They had left the party of Umberto Bossi in disagreement with his decision to bring down Berlusconi I Cabinet in December 1994. It was initially composed of 14 Deputies and 10 Senators.

At that time Lega Nord was split between those who supported the new course of the party and those who wanted to continue the alliance with Silvio Berlusconi's Forza Italia. Among the latter figured also Roberto Maroni, minister of the Interior under Berlusconi and number two of the party. The decision of Bossi led him to leave resign from Parliament on 11 February. LIF members hoped that Maroni would have joined their party (to become its leader) and tried to convince him to run as their candidate for the post of President of Lombardy. Contrarily to what most people expected, Maroni did not leave Northern League and returned to active politics in July.

This was a hard blow for Negri and his followers. Many of them thus switched to the Federalist Union (UF) led by Gianfranco Miglio or the Federalists and Liberal Democrats (FLD), led by Furio Gubetti and Raffaele Costa. On 14 July the party's group in the Chamber of Deputies was reduced to a sub-group within the Mixed Group. On 20 December most members of LIF, including Luigi Negri, joined FLD. The year later, again in December, a substantial group of LIF members, including Enrico Hüllwech, Flavio Devetag and Luca Azzano Cantarutti, joined the parliamentary group of the Christian Democratic Centre (CCD).

In the 1996 general election, when the Northern League, despite the several splits had its best result ever (10.1% nationally), the only member of LIF who stood as candidate under the party's banner was Luca Azzano Cantarutti, future president of Venetian Independence, who got just 2.8% of the vote in the single-seat constituency of Adria. LIF leader Luigi Negri was however re-elected to the Chamber for the Pole for Freedoms and soon joined Forza Italia along with what remained of UF and FLD. He later left also that party to join the Italian Republican Party and thus the centre-left coalition supporting Romano Prodi's government. Among the other leading members of LIF, Enrico Hüllwech was elected Mayor of Vicenza in 1998 for Forza Italia, while Giorgio Vido was one of the leaders of Fronte Marco Polo and Liga Fronte Veneto.

== Leadership ==
- Federal Coordinator: Sergio Cappelli (1995–1996)
