= Federalist Greens =

Defunct political party in Italy

The Federalist Greens (Verdi Federalisti) are a small environmentalist and Catholic political party in Italy. The national president of the party was Laura Scalabrini.

== History ==
The party was created in 1992 as a split from the Federation of the Greens. The Federalist Greens debuted to the 1992 political elections however it failed to gain any seats. In the 1994 political elections the party presented its lists only in Lazio, in a uninominal college of the Chamber of Deputies and in all the colleges of the Senate. The result for the Senate, on a regional basis, was respectable (3.23% of the vote), but insufficient to elect any senators.

In the 2004 European elections the Federalist Greens presented a joint list with the Greens Greens in all districts. After the European elections, the Federalist Greens and the Greens Greens created a common program. Maurizio Lupi became solely responsible for northern Italy, while Laura Scalabrini became the responsible for the Center, the South and the Islands.

In 2005 the Federalist Greens participated in the regional elections in conjunction with Christian Democracy for Autonomies.

In the 2006 political elections the Greens Greens and the Federalist Greens presented the same logo used for the European elections, but this time the logo was rejected by the Court of Cassation. The symbol was replaced with the bear that laughs and that greets of the Greens Greens while the name was replaced with the wording The Environmenta-list - Democratic Ecologists. After this latest electoral experiment, however, the common movement has since become inactive.
