= Elisabetta Trenta =

Italian politician (born 1967)

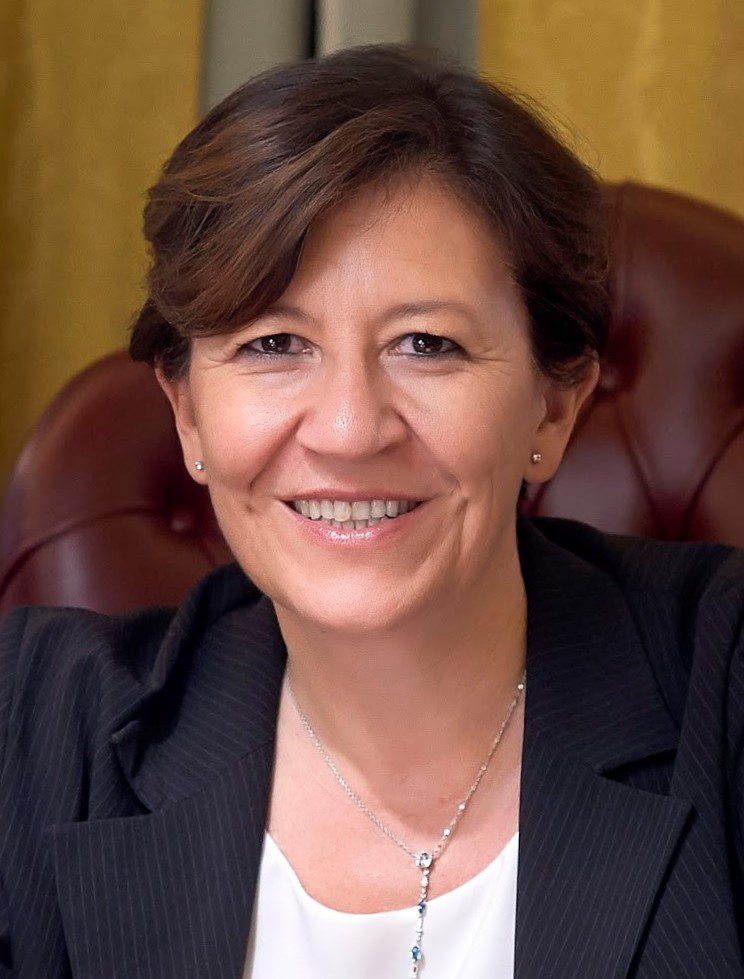

Minister of Defence
- In office 1 June 2018 – 5 September 2019
- Prime Minister: Giuseppe Conte
- Preceded by: Roberta Pinotti
- Succeeded by: Lorenzo Guerini

Personal details
- Born: 4 June 1967 (age 59) Velletri, Italy
- Party: CCD (1997–2002); M5S (2018–2021); IdV (2021); DC (2023–present)
- Education: Sapienza University of Rome

Elisabetta Trenta (born 4 June 1967) is an Italian politician who served as the Italian Minister of Defence in the Conte I Cabinet.

== Biography ==
In 1994, Trenta graduated in political science at La Sapienza University of Rome. She also had a master's in International Development and a master's in intelligence and security. She worked as an adviser for the mission Ancient Babylon for the Italian Ministry of Defence, and senior expert in the task force in Iraq for the Italian Ministry of Foreign Affairs.

In 2009, Trenta was recalled in service as captain in the UNIFIL mission in Lebanon and in 2012 she coordinated a project in Libya for the reduction of illegal weapons. She is also deputy director of the Master in Intelligence and Security of Link Campus University, and has collaborated with the Military Center for Strategic Studies (CEMISS), focusing particularly on proxy wars.

According to her curriculum, Trenta is engaged in social work through two associations of which she is vice-president: Children of Nassiriya Onlus, which carries out projects in Iraq, and the Flauto Magico.

Trenta ran in the 2018 Italian general election for the Five Star Movement (M5S) without being elected. In June 2018, she was appointed Italian Minister of Defence in the government of Giuseppe Conte, who led a cabinet composed by members of the M5S and Lega.

Political offices
Preceded by Roberta Pinotti	Minister of Defence; 2018–2019	Succeeded by Lorenzo Guerini
