= Ossolan Union for Autonomy =

Italian political party

The Ossolan Union for Autonomy (Unione Ossolana per l'Autonomia, UOPA) was a regionalist political party active in Ossola, a valley region of Piedmont, Italy.

The party was founded in 1977 by Alvaro Corradini (mayor of Trontano and formerly partisan in the Italian Resistance), Walter Cattani, Sergio Gandolfi, Alberto Crotti, Camillo Ferrari, and Michele Hor. The UOPA had its roots in the short-lived independent partisan republic during the Italian resistance movement. The party's newspaper was edited briefly by Bruno Salvadori, leader of Valdostan Union and mentor of Umberto Bossi.

In list with List for Trieste, the UOPA won 0.5% in the 1980 regional election. In the same year the party elected five municipal councillors in Domodossola, being the third largest party in the town, and one provincial councillor in the Province of Novara.

The UOPA can be considered a direct precursor of Piedmontese Union, Autonomist Piedmont and, thus, Lega Nord and the Italian league movement.
