= Lucio Malan =

Italian politician

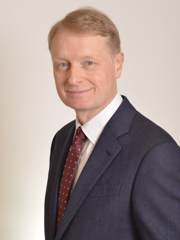

Member of the Senate
- Incumbent
- Assumed office 30 May 2001

Member of the Chamber of Deputies
- In office 15 April 1994 – 8 May 1996

Personal details
- Born: 30 July 1960 (age 66) Luserna San Giovanni, Italy
- Party: LN (1990–1994); FLD (1994–1996); FI (1996–2009); PdL (2009–2013); FI (2013–2021); FdI (since 2021)
- Education: University of Turin
- Profession: Politician, teacher

Lucio Malan (born 30 July 1960) is an Italian politician.

== Biography ==
Malan was born in Luserna San Giovanni, Turin. In 1983 he graduated in Literature at the University of Turin.

Lucio Malan is member of the People of Freedom Party. From 1994 to 1996 he was a deputy. Since 2001 he has been senator and secretary to the presidency of Italian Senate. He is also a member of the NATO Parliamentary Assembly.

Lucio Malan is a member of the Waldensian Evangelical Church.

From 1990 to 1998 he was guest speaker of Italian History and Culture at University Studies Abroad Consortium in Turin, Italy.

From 1998 to 2008 he was the director of communications of Forza Italia.

Malan chairs the Italy-Taiwan parliamentary friendship group.
