= Dario Giagoni =

Italian politician (born 1979)

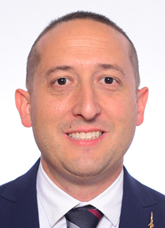
- Giagoni in 2022

Member of the Chamber of Deputies
- Incumbent
- Assumed office 13 October 2022
- Constituency: Sardinia – 04

Personal details
- Born: 15 February 1979 (age 47)
- Party: Lega

Dario Giagoni (born 15 February 1979) is an Italian politician serving as a member of the Chamber of Deputies since 2022. He has served as coordinator of Lega Sardegna since 2021. From 2019 to 2022, he was a member of the Regional Council of Sardinia.
