= North-East Movement =

North-East Movement Movimento Nordest
- Leader: Massimo Cacciari
- Founded: 1997
- Dissolved: c. 1999
- Ideology: Federalism; Regionalism

The North-East Movement (Italian: Movimento Nordest) was a federalist political party active in Veneto, Italy.

== History ==
The party was founded in 1997 and officially launched in January 1998 by the mayor of Venice, Massimo Cacciari, and the former president of the industrialists of Veneto, Mario Carraro. It was also known as the "Catalan party". Mario Rigo, leader of the Lega delle Regioni (which brought together Lega Autonomia Veneta, Lega Autonomia Friuli and Lega Autonomia Trentino) had also joined the new movement. However, both Rigo and his direct collaborators adhering to the Lega delle Regioni were not immediately informed of the stipulation of the Constitution Act of the movement (drawn up at the end of 1997); indeed, the document was made known to Rigo, confidentially, only after several months. Additionally, the North-East Movement was also joined by numerous young people belonging to the social centers of the north-east Italy.

The main purpose of the movement was to press the centre-left on the path of federalist reform of the Italian State and to attract the Venetian voters in opposition to the secessionist policy of the Northern League.

The convergence of two characters so different from each other in the party leadership (Cacciari and Carraro) soon turned into a bitter clash between the two, both on the pages of the local press and during organizational assemblies where in the end the counting of votes effectively sanctioned the divorce, assigning the leadership of the movement to Cacciari through his operational arm, the former socialist Rigo.

Following a letter from Cacciari in which he accused him of mental constraints, on 31 July 1998 Carraro decided to leave the movement. However, the day after Carraro's farewell to the movement, Cacciari invited him to go back, not understanding the political reasons for that abandonment.

On the occasion of the administrative elections of 1998, the movement scored a good result in the provincial election of Treviso (8.8% of the vote), for which it competed with its own candidate, Gianni Maddalon; the movement quickly regressed after Cacciari's disengagement, more interested in coordinating with the other mayors of the Olive Tree, many of whom had joined the new Democrats' party. Rigo's movement then tried to extend beyond the borders of Veneto (taking the name of Lega delle Regioni at national level) and participating unsuccessfully in the 1999 European elections in a list with the Sardinian Action Party and the core of what would later become United Consumers. On 7 February 1999, on the occasion of the first convention in Noale, the social centers of the north-east also declared their withdrawal from the party.

Despite its initial purpose, the North-East Movement was never able, during its short existence, to counter the great strength of the Northern League.
