= Roberta Pinotti =

Italian politician (born 1961)

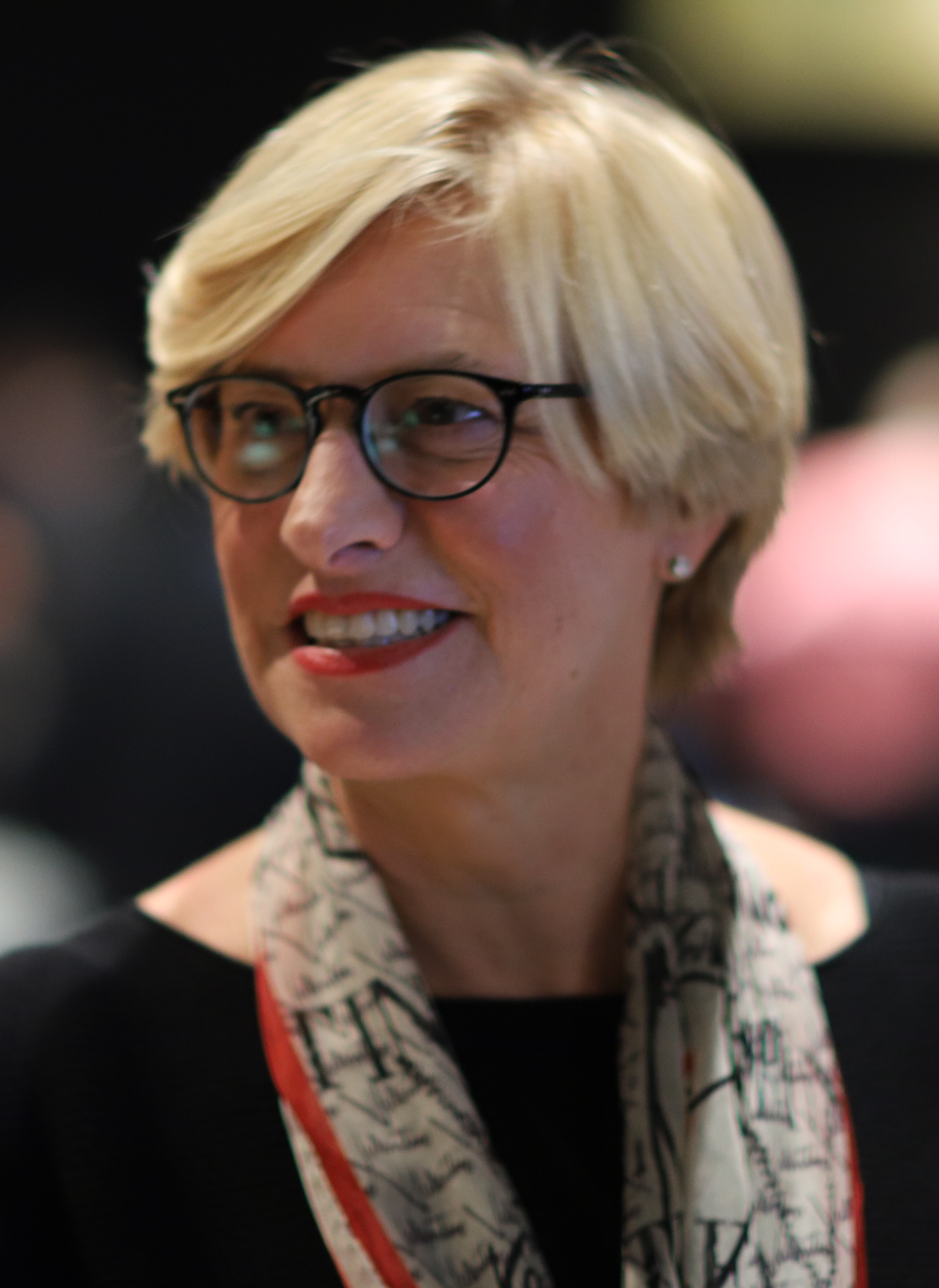

Minister of Defence
- In office 22 February 2014 – 1 June 2018
- Prime Minister: Matteo Renzi; Paolo Gentiloni
- Preceded by: Mario Mauro
- Succeeded by: Elisabetta Trenta

Member of the Senate of the Republic
- In office 29 April 2008 – 13 October 2022
- Constituency: Liguria (2008–2018); Piedmont (2018–2022)

Member of the Chamber of Deputies
- In office 30 May 2001 – 28 April 2008
- Constituency: Liguria

Personal details
- Born: 20 May 1961 (age 65) Genoa, Italy
- Party: PCI (1989–1991); PDS (1991–1998); DS (1998–2007); Democratic Party (since 2007)
- Education: University of Genoa

Roberta Pinotti (born 20 May 1961) is an Italian politician. A member of the Democratic Party, she served as the Italian Minister of Defence in the governments of Matteo Renzi and Paolo Gentiloni from 22 February 2014 to 1 June 2018.

== Early life ==
Pinotti was born in Genoa, in 1961; she holds a degree in modern literature at the University of Genoa and is a teacher of Italian in high schools. During her adolescence, she was a member of the Association of Italian Catholic Guides and Scouts.

== Political career ==
Pinotti began her political career at the end of the 1980s as a district counselor of Italian Communist Party. She later joined the Democratic Party of the Left, the Democrats of the Left party (in which she held the position of provincial secretary between 1999 and 2001) and the Democratic Party. In her hometown she has served as councilor for school, youth policies and social policies (1993–1997) and for educational institutions (1997–1999).

First elected deputy in 2001, Pinotti was the shadow minister of defense in the Shadow Cabinet of Walter Veltroni between May 2008 and April 2009. In 2012 she was a candidate for the centre-left primary election to become Mayor of Genoa, but she arrived only third after the leftist Marco Doria and the upcoming Mayor Marta Vincenzi.

In 2013, Pinotti was appointed undersecretary of state (sottosegretario di Stato) in the Ministry of Defence in the government led by Enrico Letta. After her stint as Minister of Defence, Pinotti became a Senator of the Democratic Party of Italy.

=== Minister of Defence ===
When the new Secretary of the Democratic Party Matteo Renzi forced Letta to resign and became the new prime minister on 22 February 2014, he appointed Pinotti as Minister of Defence; she is the first woman to have ever held this office in Italy. Her first act was to meet the wives of the two Italian marines detained in India, due to the Enrica Lexie case. She received the America Award of the Italy-USA Foundation in 2014.

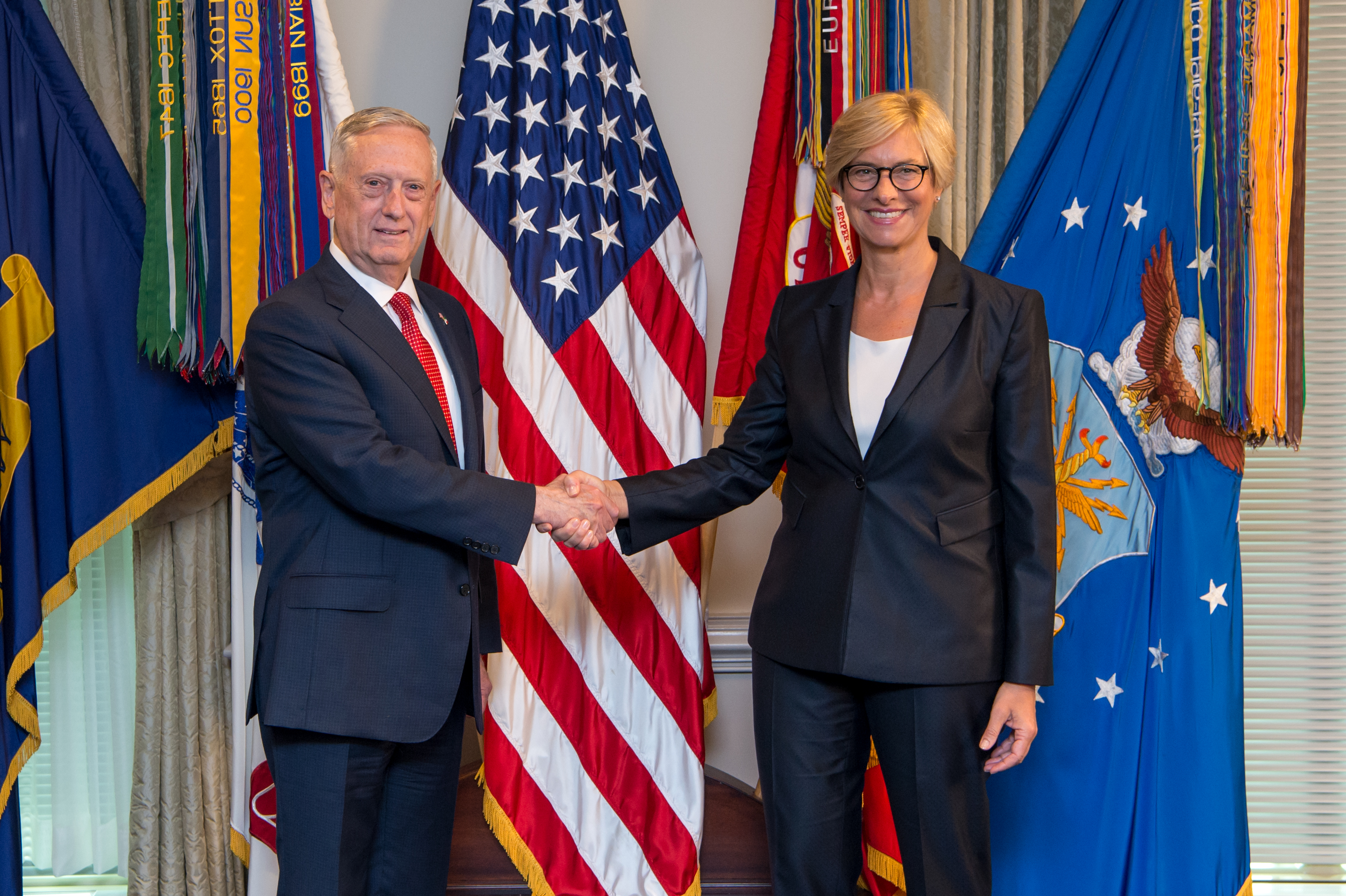
Pinotti with the U.S. Secretary of Defense, James Mattis, in 2017.

In October 2014, Pinotti visited the United Arab Emirates and met with Deputy Supreme Commander of the Armed Forces Crown Prince Mohammed bin Zayed Al Nahyan in order to strengthen the bilateral relations with regards to the Defense. In February 2015 she returned to the United Arab Emirates in occasion of the International Defence Industry Exhibition (IDEX), attended by several Italian companies, and met again with Mohammed bin Zayed Al Nahyan.

Pinotti received criticism in February 2015 over navy recruitment adverts which used slogans written in English. Later that month, she hinted that Italy was ready to lead a coalition force to defeat ISIS in Libya, saying: "We have been discussing it for months, but now an intervention has become urgent."

On 12 December 2016, when Renzi resigned as prime minister after the constitutional referendum, Pinotti was confirmed as defence minister by the new prime minister Paolo Gentiloni. In 2017, the Parliament approved the "White Book", a plan of reorganization of the heads of the Ministry of Defence and the related structures; the plan also provided a reform of the Italian Armed Forces and a reorganization of the training system.

Political offices
Preceded by Mario Mauro	Minister of Defence; 2014–2018	Succeeded by Elisabetta Trenta
