= Extended Christian Pact =

Extended Christian Pact Patto Cristiano Esteso
- Abbreviation: PA.C.E.
- Coordinator: Massimo Ripepi
- Founded: 1994
- Dissolved: 2012
- Merged into: Cantiere Popolare
- Ideology: Christian democracy Conservatism
- Political position: Centre-right
- Colors: red

Website
- http://web.tiscalinet.it/peace/framepace.htm

The Extended Christian Pact (Patto Cristiano Esteso, PACE) was a Christian-conservative political party in Italy founded by Gilberto Perri in 1994.

The party takes example from the Christian Coalition in the United States and is one of the few examples of Christian right parties in Europe. Although most of its members are Evangelicals or Pentecostals, the party is not officially associated with any denomination. The party's founder and leader is Gilberto Perri, a Pentecostal pastor, who has been one of the founding members of Christian Coalition International with Pat Robertson in 1999.

PACE has been affiliated to the House of Freedoms coalition and generally sides with the Italian centre-right. It is stronger in Southern Italy, where Pentecostal and Evangelical churches are more widespread. In the 2006 general election PACE won 0.4% in Sicily for the Senate, but its best results so far came in 2011 local elections, when the party gained 3.6% (and one councillor) in Reggio Calabria and 2.1% throughout the Province.

In 2012 PACE formed the Cantiere Popolare coalition along with The Populars of Italy Tomorrow, Popular Action and the Christian Movement of Workers.
