= Christian Democracy (Italy, 2023) =

Italian political party

Christian Democracy Democrazia Cristiana
- Abbreviation: DC
- Secretary: Raffaele De Rosa
- Founded: 2023
- Headquarters: Crati Square 5, Rome 00199, Italy
- Ideology: Christian democracy
- Political position: Centre
- National affiliation: Coalition: Centre-right coalition Political party: Forza Italia (since 2023)
- Chamber of Deputies: 0 / 400
- Senate: 1 / 200 (Into Forza Italia)
- European Parliament: 0 / 76
- Regional Councils: 0 / 896

Website
- democrazia-cristiana.net

Christian Democracy (Democrazia Cristiana, DC) is a minor Christian democratic political party in Italy.

The party, one of the several supposed heirs of the defunct Christian Democracy (DC), was started in February 2023 by Antonio Cirillo, a lawyer from Torre del Greco, who was elected secretary during a congress summoned in force of the old DC's 1984 statute. The party was soon joined by Fabio Desideri, former mayor of Marino and regional councillor in Lazio until 2010, and Elisabetta Trenta, a former minister of Defence in the first Conte government, representing the Five Star Movement (M5S).

In April 2023 the party's usage of the name "Christian Democracy" was challenged in court by Angelo Sandri of another Christian Democracy. For his part, Cirillo challenged several other groups for using the old DC's party logo. In the meantime, the party tried to participate in the 2023 Molise regional election, but was excluded for technical reasons.

In the 2024 Sardinian regional election the party supported Paolo Truzzu for president and finally took part in the electoral list formed by Sardinia Alliance.

In February 2025, during an extraordinary congress, Trenta was elected secretary and Cirillo was sidelined. The following August senator Raffaele De Rosa, elected with the M5S and then part of the parliamentary group of Forza Italia, joined the party, giving it parliamentary representation. After a few weeks, De Rosa was appointed secretary of the party.

== Leadership ==
- Secretary: Antonio Cirillo (2023–2025), Elisabetta Trenta (2025), Raffaele De Rosa (2025–present)
