= Pact of Democrats for Reforms =

Political party in Italy

Pact of Democrats for Reforms Patto dei Democratici per le Riforme
- President: Salvatore Cardinale
- Founded: 2014
- Dissolved: 2015
- Merged into: Future Sicily
- Ideology: Regionalism
- Political position: Centre

The Pact of Democrats for Reforms (Italian: Patto dei Democratici per le Riforme, PDR) was a regional centrist political party active in Sicily, Italy, led by former minister Salvatore Cardinale.

The party was born in 2014 from the merge of the Reformist Democrats for Sicily of Giuseppe Picciolo and the Sicilian Voice of Michele Cimino and Pippo Gianni The PDR was endorsed by the PD's national leadership. The group of the new party in the Sicilian Regional Assembly was composed of: Beppe Picciolo (chairman), Michele Cimino (spokesman), Edy Tamajo, Marcello Greco, Salvo Lo Giudice and Pippo Gianni.

In October 2015 it merged with part of Democratic Sicily, into the new party Future Sicily.
