= The DemoKRats =

The DemoKRats (I DemoKRatici, DKR) are a centrist Italian political party, based in Calabria.

The party was founded by Enzo Sculco, a former regional councillor of The Daisy from the province of Crotone (KR, hence the name of the party). DKR was initially launched in 2008 as an internal faction of the Crotone's Democratic Party, however, since 2009 it began to present its own electoral lists, independent from those of PD. In the 2009 provincial election of Crotone DKR scored 8.6% of the vote, resulting the first party in the centre-left coalition in support of the candidate Ubaldo Schifino.

In the 2010 regional elections in Calabria, the DKR supported the candidacy of Giuseppe Scopelliti, candidate of the centre-right coalition, while in the 2013 Italian general election the party supported the People of Freedom list. In the 2014 European Parliament election the DKR supported Scopelliti, who had resigned a few months earlier from President of Calabria after his conviction for abuse of power and was running for the New Centre-Right, but he was not elected.

On 1 November 2013, the statute of DKR was approved and it officially became a political association.

In the 2014 regional election the party formed a joint list with the Italian Republican Party, Alliance for Italy, Autonomy South and the Moderates in support of Mario Oliverio, the Democratic candidate for president. The list won 5.2% of the vote (15.4% in Crotone) and Flora Sculco, daughter of Enzo, was elected to the Regional Council.

In the 2020 regional election Flora Sculco was re-elected regional councillor among the rank of the Progressive Democrats.

In July 2021 Enzo and Flora Sculco announce their adhesion to the Union of the Centre and the consequent return to the centre-right coalition.
