= Federalist Alliance =

Italian Political Party

Logo of Federalist Alliance

The Federalist Alliance (Italian: Alleanza Federalista) was a federalist Italian political party, which was the emanation of Lega Nord in Central and Southern Italy.

The party was founded in 2003, after the Lega Sud Ausonia of Gianfranco Vestuto, which had been the Lega Nord's sister party in the South for many years, broke the alliance with Lega Nord and turned to its original anti-Northern feelings.

The party was led by Giacomo Chiappori, former MP of Lega Nord and leader of Lega Nord Liguria with Southern ascent. The party had two regional deputies in Tuscany, where Lega Nord Toscana is also active: Virgilio Luvisotti and Jacopo Maria Ferri.

In the 2008 general election both Chiappori and Maraventano were elected to the Italian Parliament, to the Chamber of Deputies for Lombardy and to the Senate for Emilia-Romagna respectively.

== Leadership ==
- Federal Secretary: Giacomo Chiappori
- Federal President: Marcello Ricci
- Federal Coordinator of Regional Sections: Enrico Pau
- Federal Administrative Secretary: Fausto Sidoli
- Federal Organizational Secretary: Enzo Maiorana
