= Future Sicily =

Future Sicily Sicilia Futura
- President: Salvatore Cardinale
- Secretary: Giuseppe Picciolo
- Founded: 23 October 2015
- Preceded by: Pact of Democrats for Reforms
- Headquarters: Palermo
- Ideology: Regionalism
- Political position: Centre
- National affiliation: Democratic Party (2015–2019); Italia Viva (2019–2021); Forza Italia (2021–present)
- Sicilian Regional Assembly: 2 / 70

Website
- https://pdrsiciliafutura.wordpress.com

Future Sicily (Italian: Sicilia Futura, SF) is a regional political party active in Sicily, Italy, led by former minister Salvatore Cardinale, whose daughter Daniela Cardinale was a deputy of the Democratic Party (PD).

SF was launched in October 2015, within the Sicilian Regional Assembly, at the merger of the Pact of Democrats for Reforms, led by Salvatore Cardinale, with a large portion of Democratic Sicily. and supported the regional government led by Rosario Crocetta (PD). The party was initially called "Pact of Democrats for Reforms – Future Sicily" and was subsequently rebranded only "Future Sicily".

In the 2016 local elections the party obtained substantial results in some medium-sized Sicilian cities: 15.8% in Favara, 14.5% in Canicattì, 14.1% in Barrafranca (where SD took 10.0%), and 9.3% in Alcamo.

In the 2017 regional election SF, in alliance with the Italian Socialist Party (PSI), obtained 6.0% of the vote and two seats in the Regional Assembly.

In April 2019, the assembly of members of SF sanctioned the end of the alliance with the PD and joined forces with Italia Viva. Following this, deputy Daniela Cardinale left the parliamentary group of the PD and switched to the Mixed Group.

In the 2022 regional election SF teamed up with Forza Italia.

== Election results ==
=== European Parliament ===
| Election | Leader | Votes | % | Seats | +/– | EP Group |
|---|---|---|---|---|---|---|
| 2024 | Salvatore Cardinale | Into FI–NM | | 0 / 76 | New | – |

=== Regional elections ===
| Election | Leader | Votes | % | Seats | +/− |
|---|---|---|---|---|---|
| 2017 | Salvatore Cardinale | 115,751 (6th) | 6.01 | 2 / 70 | New |
| 2022 | Salvatore Cardinale | Into FI | | 2 / 70 | 0 |

== Leadership ==
- Secretary: Salvatore Cardinale (2015–2019), Giuseppe Picciolo (2019–present)
- President: Salvatore Cardinale (2019–present)
