= Progett'Azione =

Defunct Italian regional political party

Progett'Azione (translatable into ProjectAction), whose full name was Progett'Azione – Popolari Piemontesi (ProjectAction – Piedmontese Populars), was a regional centrist Italian political party active in Piedmont. The party, whose leader was Maria Teresa Armosino, was a spin-off of The People of Freedom (PdL).

The party was launched in June 2012 by Armosino, a long-time member of the Italian Parliament and president of the Province of Asti, and five regional councillors, namely Angelo Burzi, Roberto Boniperti, Roberto Tentoni, Rosanna Valle, and Gian Luca Vignale. While Armosino had been a member of Forza Italia, the majority of the regional group's members hailed from National Alliance. The members of PA still considered to be part of the PdL, but they did not recognize its regional leadership, which promptly proposed the eviction of the dissenters from the PdL.

In February 2014, ahead of the regional election, the party was merged into the new Forza Italia.
