= Lega Sardegna =

- Secretary: Dario Giagoni (coordinator)
- Founded: 2010
- Headquarters: Cagliari
- Newspaper: none
- Membership: unknown
- Ideology: Sardinian nationalism Regionalism; Populism
- National affiliation: Lega
- Regional Council: 8 / 60

Website
- www.leganord.org

Lega Sardegna (English: Sardinia League; abbr. LS), whose complete name is Lega Sardegna per Salvini Premier (English: Sardinia League for Salvini Premier), is a regionalist and Sardinian nationalist political party active in Sardinia, Italy.

== History ==
The party was established as Lega Nord Sardinia (English: Northern League Sardinia; abbr. LNS) in 2010, but, despite being loosely affiliated with Lega Nord (LS) through Roberto Mura (a Lombard senator of Sardinian descent), it was never recognised among the LN's "national" sections. At its beginnings, LNS's main local leader was Giorgio Ladu, a former national secretary of the social-democratic Sardinian Action Party (PSd'Az). The party became the regional section of Lega per Salvini Premier (LSP) in Sardinia in 2020.

In the 2009 European Parliament election, LN won 0.7% in the region. The party was strongest in the province of Ogliastra (5.1%), Ladu's political base, and in the province of Olbia-Tempio (1.9%). In the 2010 provincial elections, the party won 2.9% in Ogliastra (where Ladu won 3.0% as candidate for President), 1.5% in Olbia-Tempio, 0.8% in Sassari and 0.4% in Cagliari.

In the 2014 European Parliament election, LN won 1.4% in the region, doing better in the Province of Olbia-Tempio (2.4%) than anywhere else.

In the 2018 general election, candidates of the PSd'Az ran within the "Lega - Salvini Premier" list, as the LN and the PSd'Az had formed an alliance. The alliance managed to get 10.8% of the vote and Christian Solinas, leader of the PSd'Az, was elected to the Senate, while Guido De Martini, a local activist of the LN, was elected to the Chamber.

In the 2019 regional election the League successfully supported Solinas for President. Solinas won 47.8% of the vote. The League was the leading force of the local centre-right coalition, gaining 11.4% and 8 seats (out of 60) in the regional council.

In 2020, the LS became the regional section of Lega per Salvini Premier. Since 2021, it has been led by Dario Giagoni.

In the 2024 regional election the party obtained 3.8% of the vote and two regional councillors.

== Popular support ==
The electoral results of Lega Nord Sardinia and Lega Sardegna in the region are shown in the table below. In general and European elections since 2006 the party has usually included the Sardinian Action Party.

1987 general	1989 European	1992 general	1994 European	1999 European	2004 European	2006 general	2009 European	2013 general	2014 European
0.4 (Note: As Liga Veneta.)	0.1 (Note: As Lega Lombarda – Alleanza Nord.)	0.3	0.2	0.1	0.2	0.4	0.7	0.1	1.4

2018 general	2019 regional	2019 European	2022 general	2024 regional
10.8	11.4	27.7	6.3	3.8
