= Movement for the Independence of the Free Territory of Trieste =

Movement for the Independence of the Free Territory of Trieste Movimento per l'Indipendenza del Territorio Libero di Trieste
- Leader: Giovanni Marchesich
- Founded: 1958
- Dissolved: 1982
- Succeeded by: Front for the Independence of the Free Territory of Trieste (unofficial successor)
- Ideology: Separatism

The Movement for the Independence of the Free Territory of Trieste (Movimento per l'Indipendenza del Territorio Libero di Trieste) was a political party based in Trieste, founded in 1958 by Giovanni Marchesich. Its main goal was the proclamation of independence of the Free Territory of Trieste from Italy.

The leader Giovanni Marchesich was continuously elected to the city council from 1962 to 1982. In 1966 the party achieved its best result, winning two seats with 4.40% of the votes.

Giorgio Marchesich (son of Giovanni), already provincial councillor for the party and member of the List for Trieste and the Julian Front, founded in 2012 the Front for Independence of the Free Territory of Trieste, a party that has inherited the legacy of the Movement for the Independence of the Free Territory of Trieste. This party scored 1.94% of the vote in the local election in 2016 with Marchesich candidate for Mayor. In 2021 Giorgio Marchesich was again candidate for mayor with the Movement for the Independence of the Free Territory of Trieste, that scored 1.45% of the vote.
