= Now Sicily =

Now Sicliy Ora Sicilia
- Leader: Luigi Genovese
- Founded: June 2019
- Dissolved: August 2022
- Split from: Forza Italia
- Merged into: Movement for Autonomy
- Ideology: Regionalism
- National affiliation: Centre-right coalition

Now Sicily (Ora Sicilia) was a regional Italian political party based in Sicily.

The party, which functioned mainly as a group within the Sicilian Regional Assembly (ARS), was launched in June 2019 by splinters from Forza Italia led by Luigi Genovese. Originally formed by three regional deputies, a month later the party was joined by Tony Rizzotto from the League. In July 2020 Now Sicily became a full-fledged party.

On 14 August 2022, Now Sicily merged into the Movement for Autonomy and Luigi Genovese was a candidate for the "Populars and Autonomists" list in the 2022 Sicilian regional election.
