= Daniela Cardinale =

Italian politician (born 1982)

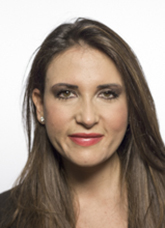
- Cardinale in 2018

Member of the Chamber of Deputies
- In office 29 April 2008 – 12 October 2022
- Constituency: Sicily 1 (2008–2018); Sicily 1 – P03 (2018–2022)

Personal details
- Born: 4 February 1982 (age 44)
- Party: Future Sicily (since 2015)
- Parent: Salvatore Cardinale (father)

Daniela Cardinale (born 4 February 1982) is an Italian politician. From 2008 to 2022, she was a member of the Chamber of Deputies. She is the daughter of Salvatore Cardinale.
