= Federalist Party (Italy) =

Italian political party

Federalist Party Partito Federalista
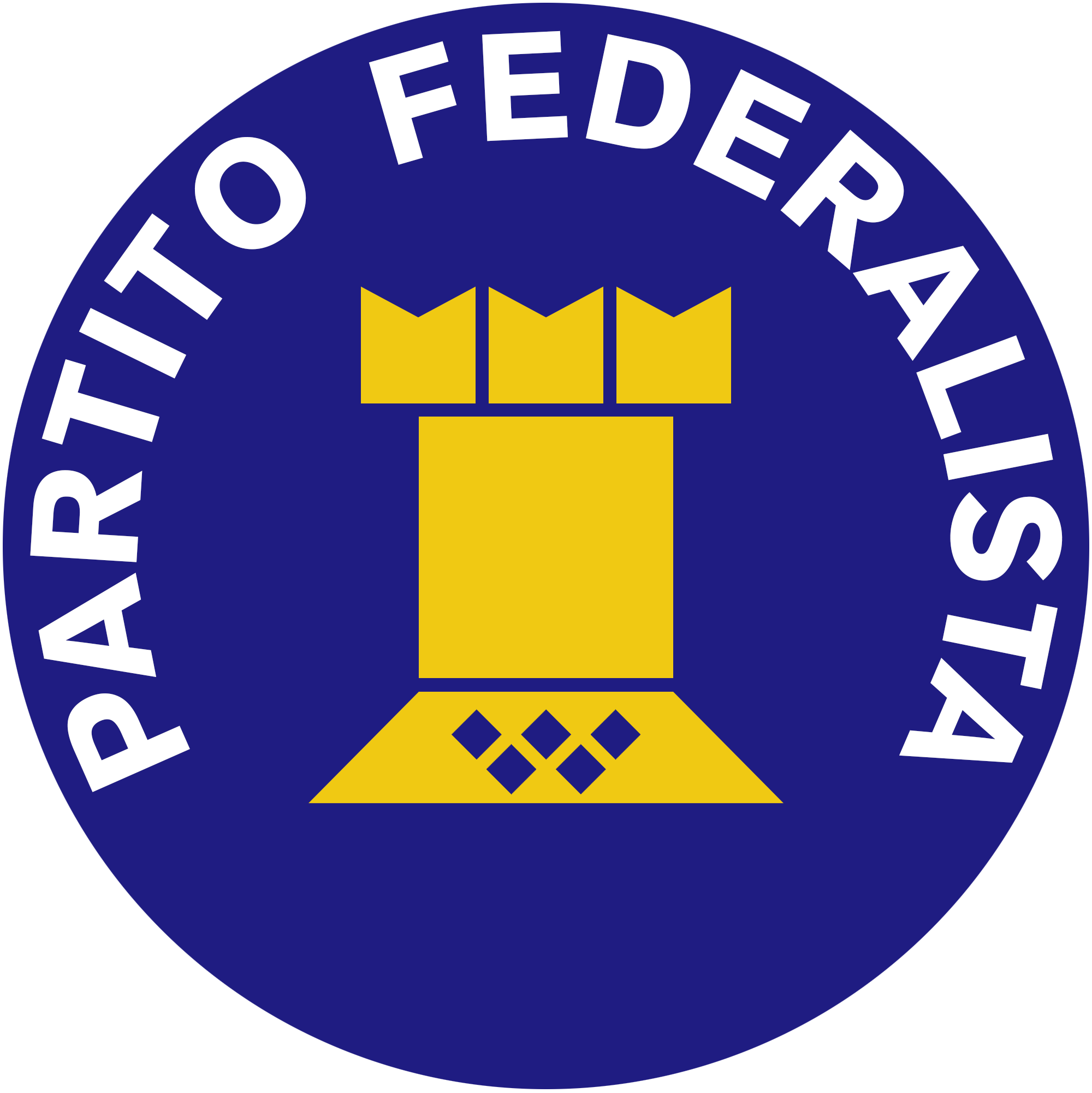
- Leader: Gianfranco Miglio
- Founded: 1994
- Dissolved: 2008
- Merged into: Movement for Autonomy
- Ideology: Federalism
- Political position: Centre-right
- National affiliation: Pole for Freedoms

The Federalist Party (Italian: Partito Federalista) was a federalist and regionalist political party in Italy. It was funded by Gianfranco Miglio and Umberto Giovine on 1 June 1994 as the Federalist Union (Italian: Unione Federalista). The party was strengthened in July 1995 by eleven deputies of the Northern League. Vittorio Sgarbi joined the party in December 1995 and became its vice-president, while Miglio and Giovine served as president and secretary, respectively.

Close to Silvio Berlusconi's party Forza Italia, it was affiliated with his Pole for Freedoms as part of Italy's centre-right coalition, and was renamed as the Federalist Party in December 1995. After Miglio's death in 2001, the party was almost disbanded; it continued to exist and to be active as the Federalist Movement (Italian: Movimento Federalista) under the leadership of Umberto Giovine until 2008, when it was merged into the Movement for Autonomy.

== History ==
The Federalist Union was founded on 1 June 1994 by Miglio, an influent member of Italy's Senate of the Republic and political scientist who left the Northern League in May 1994 over disagreements with Umberto Bossi, and Giovine, a former Italian Socialist Party member who was at the time member of Berlusconi's Forza Italia. In July 1995, the group was strengthened by the joining of eleven members of Italy's Chamber of Deputies, all former members of the Northern League who had previously joined the Federalist Italian League and the Federalists and Liberal Democrats; among the major exponents of the Federalist Italian League were Enrico Hüllweck, who was elected mayor of Vicenza in 1998 for Forza Italia, and Giorgio Vido, who became a leader of the Marco Polo Front and the Liga Veneta Repubblica. This made possible the establishment of a sub-group within the Mixed Group in the Chamber of Deputies.

The Federalist Party was officially founded on 17 December 1995 as an evolution of the Federalist Union. Miglio's goal was for it to be an anti-party and represents single-issue politics, to be disbanded as soon as a federal or confederal Italian Republic had been achieved. At the founding congress in Milan, Sgarbi, an art critic and maverick politician, joined the party. The program of the party included the idea of transforming Italy in a federal state modelled onto the examples of Switzerland and the United States, composed by three cantons (Padania, Etruria, and Mediterranea) and the five existing Italian autonomous regions. The central government would have been entrusted to a directorial system made up of the governors of the three cantons, by a rotating president of the five special statute regions, and by the federal president of the republic, to be elected by universal and direct suffrage every four years. In Miglio's intentions, the federal president would have been a true head of government on the American model, even if the president's will would have to be coordinated with that of the other members of the federal directorate. Thus, the federation would have been presided by a strong presidential system.

For the 1996 Italian general election, Sgarbi left Miglio to form a list with Marco Pannella, the Pannella–Sgarbi List. Miglio was elected senator in his single-seat constituency in Como with the support of the Pole for Freedoms as Giovine, the party's secretary, did in Lodi. In the Chamber of Deputies, the party presented itself with its own logo in the Piedmont 1 constituency only for the proportional quota and in the single-member constituency of Vigonza; in the rest of Italy, the party's members run within Forza Italia and the centre-right coalition of the Pole for Freedoms. In addition to Miglio elected senator, Giovine, Luigi Negri, and Giuseppe Rossetto were elected deputies, with the party achieving at its peak eleven deputies in 1996. Miglio joined the Mixed Group, while Rossetto, Giovine, and Negri joined the Forza Italia group; later in 1997, they joined the Italian Republican Party group and the centre-left coalition that supported the first Prodi government. In 1997, the Federalist Party formed joint lists with the Union of the Centre at the local level and continued its approachment with Forza Italia. The party was almost disbanded after the death of Miglio in 2001 but continued to exist and to be active as the Federalist Movement under the leadership of Giovine. In 2008, the party was merged into the Movement for Autonomy.

== Leadership ==
- President: Gianfranco Miglio (1994–2001)
  - Vice President: Vittorio Sgarbi (1995–1996)
- Secretary: Umberto Giovine (1994–2008)
