= Valeria Sudano =

Italian politician (born 1975)

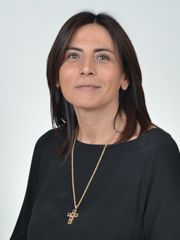
- Sudano in 2018

Member of the Chamber of Deputies
- Incumbent
- Assumed office 13 October 2022
- Constituency: Sicily 2 – U02

Member of the Senate
- In office 23 March 2018 – 12 October 2022
- Constituency: Sicily – P02

Personal details
- Born: 26 September 1975 (age 50) Catania
- Party: Lega (since 2021)

Valeria Sudano (born 26 September 1975) is an Italian politician serving as a member of the Chamber of Deputies since 2022. From 2018 to 2022, she was a member of the Senate.
