= The Populars of Italy Tomorrow =

Italian political party

The Populars of Italy Tomorrow I Popolari di Italia Domani
- Leader: Francesco Saverio Romano
- Founded: 28 September 2010
- Dissolved: 4 January 2012
- Split from: Union of the Centre
- Merged into: Cantiere Popolare
- Headquarters: Corso Vittorio Emanuele 229; 00186 Rome
- Membership: unknown
- Ideology: Christian democracy
- Political position: Centre to centre-right
- International affiliation: None

Website
- www.ipopolariditaliadomani.it

The Populars of Italy Tomorrow (I Popolari di Italia Domani, PID) was a Christian-democratic political party in Italy whose power base was in Sicily. It is currently affiliated with Forza Italia.

PID was launched on 28 September 2010 by five splinter deputies (four from Sicily and one from Campania) of the Union of the Centre (UdC) led by Francesco Saverio Romano, the UdC leader in Sicily. They dissented with the party's support to Raffaele Lombardo's fourth regional government and chose to vote in favour of Silvio Berlusconi in a vote of confidence on 29 September in the Chamber of Deputies.

It was a damaging split for the UdC in Sicily, the party's historical stronghold, as 7 regional deputies out of 10 chose to follow Romano, additionally joined by a splinter from the Movement for the Autonomies, Lombardo's party. With 8 deputies, PID are the fifth largest party in the Regional Assembly. Behind the scenes, the party was supported by Salvatore Cuffaro, senator and former President of Sicily, who was forced to leave politics in January 2011 due to a 7-year conviction for mafia-related crimes.

On 20 October 2010, in the Chamber of Deputies, PID formed a joint group with We the South (NS) led by Luciano Sardelli (NS). On 20 January 2011 PID was a founding component of Responsible Initiative, a centre-right group in the Chamber, but Calogero Mannino refused to join it.

In March Mannino finally left the party to start his own, which will be called Popular Initiative, while Romano was appointed minister of Agriculture in Berlusconi IV Cabinet.

In 2012 the PID formed Cantiere Popolare along with Popular Action, the Christian Movement of Workers and the Extended Christian Pact. The new party ran in the Sicilian regional election of 2012, winning 5.9% of the votes and 4 regional deputies.

In 2013 PID–Cantiere Popolare became an associate party of Forza Italia.

== Leadership ==
- Coordinator: Francesco Saverio Romano (2010–2013)
- President: Calogero Mannino (2010–2011)
