= Salvo Andò =

Italian academic and politician (born 1945)

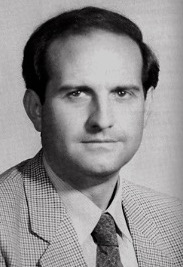

Minister of Defence
- In office 28 June 1992 – 28 April 1993
- Prime Minister: Giuliano Amato
- Preceded by: Virginio Rognoni
- Succeeded by: Fabio Fabbri

Member of the Chamber of Deputies
- In office 20 June 1979 – 14 April 1994
- Constituency: Catania

Personal details
- Born: 13 February 1945 (age 81) Giarre, Italy
- Party: PSI (until 1994); LS (1998–2003); SDI (2003–2007); PD (since 2008)
- Education: University of Catania

Salvatore "Salvo" Andò (born 13 February 1945) is an Italian academic and politician who was Minister of Defence between 1992 and 1993. A leading figure of the Italian Socialist Party (PSI), he was a city councilor from 1970 to 1991, first in Giarre and then in Catania. Elected to the Chamber of Deputies for the first time in 1979, he was a member of the Italian Parliament for four legislatures. Andò was Minister of Defense in the first Amato government from June 1992 to April 1993.

== Early life and education ==
Andò was born in Giarre on 13 February 1945. A leading figure of the Italian Socialist Party (PSI), he is the son of the first socialist mayor of Giarre, Biagio Andò. He graduated in Law at the University of Catania. Andò was a professor of law at different universities since the 1970s.

== Political career ==
In 1970, Andò was elected city councilor in Giarre. In his role as city councilor, first for Giarre and then Catania, he was re-elected until 1991. In the 1979 Italian general election, Andò was elected deputy, a position he held until the 1994 Italian general election. He was vice president of the parliamentary commission of inquiry into the Propaganda Due (P2) Masonic lodge. He was president of the PSI parliamentary group from April to June 1992, and was a member of the party's national management and secretariat. During his mandate, following the intensification of the war against the Sicilian Mafia marked by the attacks in which the magistrates Giovanni Falcone and Paolo Borsellino lost their lives, the decision was made for the first time to massively intervene by the Italian Army to carry out public order functions with Operation Vespri Siciliani.

On 28 June 1992, Andò was appointed Minister of Defence in the Council of Ministers led by Prime Minister Giuliano Amato, and held office until 28 April 1993. After the dissolution of the PSI, he remained in the socialist area and founded the Liberal Socialists (SL) in 1998. He then joined the Italian Democratic Socialists (SDI) in 2003. Furthermore, Andò was indicted for a case of bribes related to the construction of the Ciminiere Fair Center in Catania. For this proceeding, Andò was convicted on 5 December 1995 together with the former president of the Sicilian Region Rino Nicolosi and the former Christian Democracy (DC) politician Nino Drago. On 30 September 1999, the sentence was canceled with referral from the Supreme Court of Cassation. During the second appeal, the statute of limitations was reached. In 2004, the Supreme Court of Cassation confirmed the statute of limitations; however, it ruled that the facts involved in the trial were proven.
