= Lega Lombarda – Alleanza Nord =

Lega Lombarda – Alleanza Nord (Lombard League – Northern Alliance) was an electoral alliance for the 1989 European Parliament election in Italy.

It was composed of six autonomist parties of six Northern regions (Italian league movement):

- Lega Lombarda
- Liga Veneta
- Piemont Autonomista
- Union Ligure
- Lega Emiliano-Romagnola
- Alleanza Toscana

The alliance won 636,242, or 1.8% of the votes and two MEPs: Francesco Speroni and Luigi Moretti, both of Lega Lombarda. In the next three years, the parties united and formed the Lega Nord on 10 February 1991. It was able to nearly quintuple its share of votes, reaching 8.6% in the 1992 general election.
