= Angelo Attaguile =

Italian politician (1947–2026)

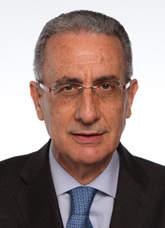
- Attaguile in 2013

Member of the Chamber of Deputies of Italy for Campania 2
- In office 15 March 2013 – 22 March 2018

Personal details
- Born: Angelo Gioachino Gaetano Attaguile; 12 May 1947 Grammichele, Italy
- Died: 8 February 2026 (aged 78) Catania, Italy
- Party: MpA (2005–2014); LSP (2014–2026)
- Education: University of Catania
- Occupation: Accounant

Angelo Gioachino Gaetano Attaguile (12 May 1947 – 8 February 2026) was an Italian politician of the Movement for Autonomy (MpA) and Lega (LSP).

Attaguile served in the Chamber of Deputies from 2013 to 2018, representing Campania 2.

Attaguile died in Catania on 8 February 2026, at the age of 78.
