= Lega Lombardo Veneta =

Lega Lombardo Veneta (Lombard Venetian League, LLV) is a right-wing social-democratic political party active in Northern Italy.

The party, which was founded in 2008 by Roberto Fornili, proposes federal reform, autonomy for the regions and libertarian principles.

In the 2009 provincial elections the party obtained a remarkable result for a new party: 1.1% in Milan, 1.6% in Monza, 1.6% in the Lecco, 0.9% in Brescia, 1.1% in Verona and 1.1% in Venice (where it was in alliance with the Italian-nationalist Tricolour Flame).

In 2011 the party formed an alliance with Future and Freedom and gained 1.3% of the vote in the province of Vercelli. In the 2012 municipal elections the party had a breakthrough in Rovato, where it garnered 12.4% of the vote, but, apart from that, had dim results.

== Leadership ==
- President: Roberto Fornili (2008–present)
- Vice President: Amedeo Santoro (2008–present), Davide Magnabosco (2008–present)
