= Sergio Cappelli =

Italian politician (1950–2026)

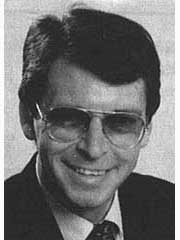
- Cappelli in the 1990s

Member of the Senate of the Republic of Italy for Savona
- In office 23 April 1992 – 9 May 1996

Personal details
- Born: 12 September 1950 Savona, Italy
- Died: 18 April 2026 (aged 75) Savona, Italy
- Party: LN; LIF
- Occupation: Engineer

Sergio Cappelli (12 September 1950 – 18 April 2026) was an Italian politician. A member of the Lega Nord and the Federalist Italian League, he served in the Senate of the Republic from 1992 to 1996.

Cappelli died in Savona on 18 April 2026, at the age of 75.
