= Raffaele De Rosa (politician) =

Italian politician (born 1978)

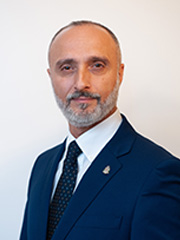
- De Rosa in 2022

Member of the Senate
- Incumbent
- Assumed office 13 October 2022
- Constituency: Campania – U07

Personal details
- Born: 20 June 1978 (age 48)
- Party: M5S (until 2024); FI (2024–2025); DC (2025–present)
- Education
- Military career
- Allegiance: Italy
- Branch: Italian Army; Military Corps of Italian Red Cross
- Service years: 2002 - 2009 in the Army; 2009 - today in Red Cross
- Rank: Captain
- Units: Sardinia Grenadiers (Army); Quartiermaster Corps (Red Cross)
- Commands: Naples' Military Red Cross Command

Raffaele De Rosa (born 20 June 1978) is an Italian politician and Red Cross military reserve officer serving as a member of the Senate since 2022. He has served as national secretary of Christian Democracy since 2025.
