= Liberal Socialists =

The Liberal Socialists (Liberalsocialisti, LS) were a regionalist social-democratic political party based in Sicily.

The party was founded in 1998 by Salvo Andò and other former leading members of the late Italian Socialist Party (PSI).

In the 2001 regional election, the party garnered 1.0% of the vote and elected a regional councillor.

In the 2003 provincial elections, the party elected provincial councillors in the provinces of Catania, Messina, Palermo, Agrigento and Caltanissetta.

In 2003, the party was merged into the Italian Democratic Socialists (SDI).

In 2010, Andò and other former Liberal Socialists formed the Socialist Clubs, a network of local social-democratic clubs in Sicily.
