= Francesco Saverio Romano =

Italian politician (born 1964)

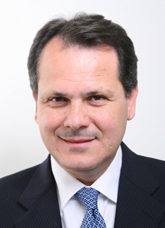
- Romano in 2008

Minister of Agriculture
- In office 23 March 2011 – 16 November 2011
- Prime Minister: Silvio Berlusconi
- Preceded by: Giancarlo Galan
- Succeeded by: Mario Catania

Member of the Chamber of Deputies
- Incumbent
- Assumed office 13 October 2022
- In office 30 May 2001 – 22 March 2018

Personal details
- Born: 24 December 1964 (age 61) Palermo, Italy
- Party: CP (since 2012); NM (since 2022)
- Other political affiliations: List: DC (until 1994) PPI (1994–1995) CDU (1995–2002) UdC (2002–2010) PID (2010–2012); NcI (2021–2023)
- Education: University of Palermo
- Profession: Politician, lawyer

Francesco Saverio Romano (born 24 December 1964) is an Italian politician and lawyer. He served as the minister of agriculture in 2011 and a member of the Chamber of Deputies between 2001 and 2018.

== Early life and education ==
Romano was born in Palermo on 24 December 1964. He holds a law degree, which he received from the University of Palermo in 1988. He was a board member of the Opera Universitaria. He joined Christian Democracy (DC) when he was a university student.

== Career ==
Romano became a member of the provincial council of Palermo in 1990. From 1993 to 1994, he served as the councillor for viability. After the dissolution of the DC in 1994, he joined the Italian People's Party (PPI), which he left in 1995 for the United Christian Democrats (CDU). From 1997 to 2001, he was the president of IRCAC, a credit institution in Sicily. He was elected to the Chamber of Deputies from the Bagheria constituency in 2001. In 2002, he left the CDU to join the Union of the Centre (UdC). He was the secretary of state for labour in the third Berlusconi government. He was re-elected to the Chamber of Deputies in 2008. Romano left the UdC in September 2010.

In 2010, Romano became the leader of The Populars of Italy Tomorrow, which was merged in 2012 with Cantiere Popolare (CP). On 23 March 2011, Romano was appointed agriculture minister to the fourth Berlusconi government in a cabinet reshuffle. Romano replaced Giancarlo Galan in the post. He was sworn in as agriculture minister despite being under investigation due to allegations about Sicilian Mafia association and corruption. Romano's term ended on 16 November 2011 when he was replaced by Mario Catania as agriculture minister.
