= Lega Nuova =

Lega Nuova (New League) was a short-lived regionalist political party active in Lombardy.

Lega Nuova was founded in 1991 by Franco Castellazzi, national president of Lega Lombarda–Lega Nord in collision with the party's leader Umberto Bossi, and by five other regional councillors from that party. By the 1992 general election some of those returned into Lega Lombarda, while Castellazzi and others ran within the lists of the Italian Democratic Socialist Party without success.

== Sources ==
- Adalberto Signore; Alessandro Trocino, Razza padana, BUR, Milan 2008
- David Parenzo; Davide Romano, Romanzo padano. Da Bossi a Bossi. Storia della Lega, Sperling & Kupfer, Milan 2009
- Francesco Jori, Dalla Łiga alla Lega. Storia, movimenti, protagonisti, Marsilio, Venice 2009
