= Lucio Tarquinio =

Italian politician (1949–2025)

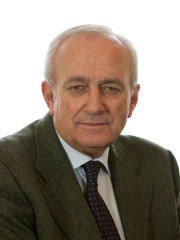
Lucio Tarquinio

Lucio Tarquinio (19 July 1949 – 19 August 2025) was an Italian politician. He was a senator from 2013 to 2018. Tarquinio died on 19 August 2025, at the age of 76.
