= Forza sempre =

Studio album by Jerry Adriani
- Released: 1999
- Genre: Pop; rock
- Length: 46:15
- Label: Indie Records; Universal
- Producer: Carlos Trilha

Forza sempre: sucessos da Legião Urbana em italiano is an album by Brazilian singer Jerry Adriani. All but the last track are cover versions of songs by Brazilian rock band Legião Urbana, translated from the original Portuguese to the Italian language.

== Track listing ==
1. "Una volta" ("Há tempos") — 3:58
2. "Monte Castello" ("Monte Castelo") — 4:11
3. "Vento sul litorale" ("Vento no litoral") — 6:15
4. "Angra dos reis" — 5:22
5. "Quando il sole entrerà dalla finestra della tua stanza" ("Quando o sol bater na janela do seu quarto") — 3:25
6. "Nel frattempo" ("Por enquanto") — 3:07
7. "Andrea Doria" — 4:12
8. "Gesso" ("Giz") — 3:27
9. "Sette città" ("Sete cidades") — 4:07
10. "Se resti aspettando il mio amor passa" ("Se Fiquei Esperando Meu Amor Passar") — 5:16
11. "Santa Lucia luntana" — 3:03

== Composing credits ==
All songs originally jointly composed by Renato Russo, Dado Villa Lobos, and Marcelo Bonfá, except:

- "Por enquanto" by Renato Russo
- "Monte Castelo" by Renato Russo, lyrics based on 1 Corinthians 13 and Camões' Sonnet 11
- "Santa Lucia luntana" by Giovanni Gaeta, arranged by Carlos Trilha and Fernando Morello.

Italian lyrics adaptation by Gabriele Dell'Utri (tracks 1, 9, 10) and Gianfranco Fabra (tracks 2, 3, 4, 5, 6, 7, 8).
