= Forza Campania =

Former Italian political party

Forza Campania (Forward Campania, FC) was a short-lived political party in Campania, Italy, functioning primarily as a group of elects within the Regional Council of Campania. The group was inspired by the former undersecretary for the economy and former Forza Italia regional coordinator Nicola Cosentino.

Forza Campania was formed in January 2014 as a split from the Forza Italia group of seven regional councilors, who nevertheless did not abandon the party. The foundation of the new group was strongly contested by Silvio Berlusconi, who saw in it an attempt to steal votes from Forza Italia.

Forza Campania was finally dissolved in June 2014.
