= Cantiere Popolare =

Italian political party

- Leader: Francesco Saverio Romano
- Founded: 4 January 2012
- Preceded by: The Populars of Italy Tomorrow
- Ideology: Christian democracy Regionalism
- Political position: Centre to centre-right
- National affiliation: Political party: The People of Freedom (2013); Forza Italia (2013–15); Liberal Popular Alliance (2015–17); Us with Italy (2017–2023); Us Moderates (2023–present); Coalition: Centre-right coalition (2017–present); Movement for Autonomy (2017–present)
- Chamber of Deputies: 1 / 400 (Into Us Moderates)
- Senate: 0 / 200
- European Parliament: 0 / 76
- Sicilian Regional Assembly: 0 / 70

Website
- www.cantierepopolare.it

Cantiere Popolare (translatable into Popular Worksite) is a Christian-democratic political party in Italy, based in Sicily.

The party's leader is Francesco Saverio Romano, a former Sicilian leader of the Union of the Centre and, later, minister of Agriculture in Silvio Berlusconi's fourth government.

== History ==
The CP was launched in January 2012 as an evolution of The Populars of Italy Tomorrow (PID), a Sicilian-based Christian-democratic emerged in 2010 as a split from the Union of the Centre (UdC). Other subjects (Popular Action, the Christian Movement of Workers and the Extended Christian Pact) took part to the project. Francesco Saverio Romano, leader of the PID, went on to lead also the CP.

In the 2012 Sicilian regional election, the CP won 5.9% of the vote and obtained four regional deputies.

CP took part in the February 2013 general election, siding with the centre-right coalition, and got 0.1% of the votes. Nevertheless, thanks to an agreement with The People of Freedom (PDL) party, Francesco Saverio Romano managed to run in PDL's list and be elected as MP. In October 2013, CP became an associate party of the newly-constituted Forza Italia (FI). In 2015, Romano left FI and joined with the Liberal Popular Alliance (ALA) parliamentary group, in support of the Renzi Cabinet.

In the run-up to the 2017 Sicilian regional election, the CP returned into the centre-right's fold and teamed up with the Movement for the Autonomies (MpA) under the electoral list "Populars and Autonomists". The list won 7.1% of the votes, obtained five regional deputies and entered the regional government led by Nello Musumeci, the newly elected president.

In December 2017, Romano broke with ALA and CP became one of the founding members of Us with Italy (NcI), a pro-Silvio Berlusconi centrist electoral list within the centre-right coalition for the 2018 general election.

== Electoral results ==
=== Regional elections ===
Election	Leader	Votes	%	Seats	+/−
2012	Francesco Saverio Romano	112,169 (8th)	5.9	4 / 90	–
2017	Francesco Saverio Romano	136,520 (4th) (Note: In a joint list with Movement for the Autonomies.)	7.1	2 / 70	▼2
2022	Francesco Saverio Romano	127,096 (7th)	6.8	0 / 70	▼2

== Leadership ==
- President: Francesco Saverio Romano (2012–present)
- Coordinator: Massimo Dell'Utri (2021–present)
