= Gianfranco Miglio =

Italian jurist, academic, and politician (1918–2001)

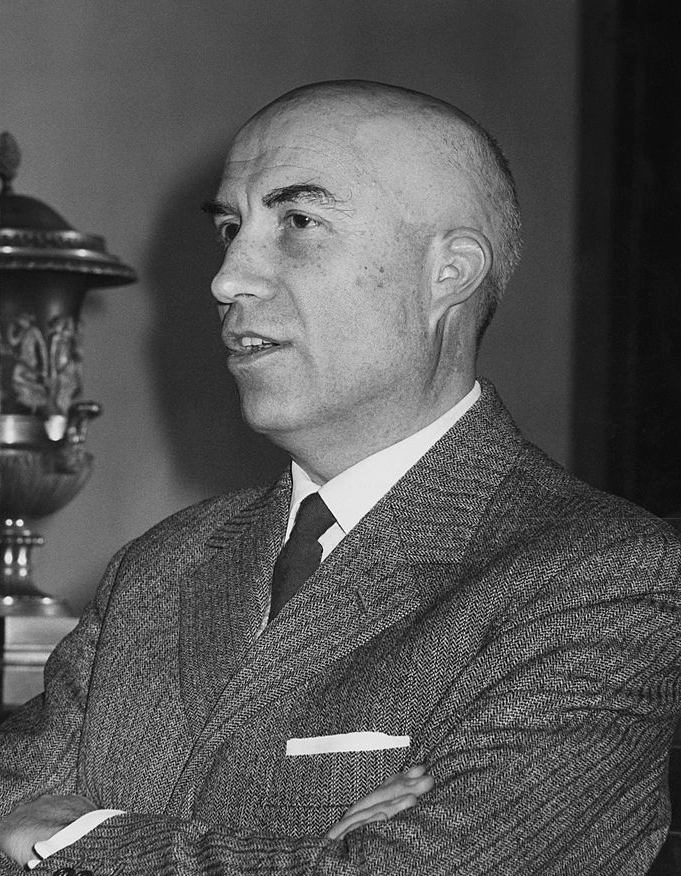

Member of the Senate of the Republic for Lombardy
- In office 23 April 1992 – 29 May 2001
- Constituency: Como

Personal details
- Born: 11 January 1918 Como, Italy
- Died: 10 April 2001 (aged 83) Como, Italy
- Party: Christian Democracy (1943–1959); Northern League (1991–1994); Federalist Party (1994–2001)
- Spouse: Miriam Previero
- Children: Leo Miglio
- Education: Università Cattolica del Sacro Cuore
- Profession: Academic; Jurist; Politologist

Philosophical work
- School: English School; Classical liberalism
- Main interests: Politics, sociology
- Notable ideas: Padania, establishment of a confederation in Italy

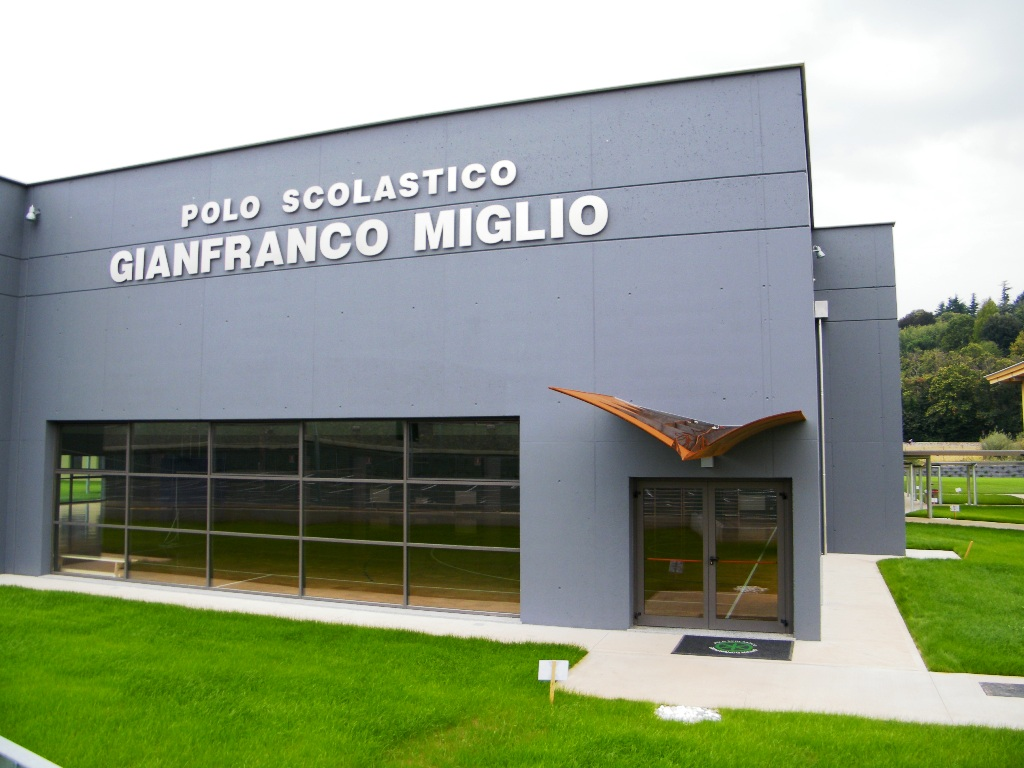
Gianfranco Miglio School Centre in Adro

Gianfranco Miglio (11 January 1918 – 10 August 2001) was an Italian jurist, political scientist, and politician. He was a founder of the Federalist Party. For thirty years, he presided over the political science faculty of Milan's Università Cattolica (Catholic University). Later on in his life, he was elected as an independent member of the Parliament to the Italian Senate for Lega Nord. The supporters of Umberto Bossi's party called him Prufesùr (the Professor), a Lombard nickname to remember his role. He was the runner-up in the 1992 presidential election.

Inspired by Max Weber and Carl Schmitt, Miglio's works have analysed prevailing power structures in politics, parliamentarianism and bureaucracies. An advocate of federalism, Miglio grew even more radical in his later years, moving to a confederal or even secessionist and libertarian standpoint, in part due to his readings of Étienne de La Boétie and Henry David Thoreau.

Some of Miglio's work has been published in English by the journal Telos, but the bulk of his opus has never been translated from Italian.

== Bibliography ==
- G. Miglio, I cattolici di fronte all'unità d'Italia, 1959.
- G. Miglio, L'amministrazione nella dinamica storica, 1961 in Storia, amministrazione e costituzione, Annale ISAP 2004.
- G. Miglio, Le trasformazioni dell'attuale regime politico, 1965.
- G. Miglio, Il ruolo del partito nella trasformazione del tipo di ordinamento politico vigente: il punto di vista della scienza della politica, Milano, 1967.
- G. Miglio, Le contraddizioni dello Stato unitario in Miglio – Benvenuti, L'unificazione amministrativa e i suoi protagonisti, Pubblicazione ISAP, Neri Pozza, Vicenza, 1969.
- G. Miglio, Rappresentanza e amministrazione nelle leggi del 1865 in Miglio – Benvenuti, L'unificazione amministrativa e i suoi protagonisti, Pubblicazione ISAP, Neri Pozza, Vicenza, 1969.
- G. Miglio, La trasformazione delle università e l'iniziativa privata, 1969.
- G. Miglio e P. Schiera, Le categorie del politico. Saggi di teoria politica, Il Mulino, Bologna, 1972.
- G. Miglio, La Valtellina: un modello possibile di integrazione economica e sociale, Quaderni Banca Piccolo Credito Valtellinese, n.1, Tipografia Bonazzi, Sondrio, 1978
- G. Miglio, Ricominciare dalla montagna Milano, Giuffrè, Milan, 1978
- G. Miglio, Genesi e trasformazioni del termine-concetto Stato, Vita e Pensiero, Milan, 1981
- G. Miglio, Guerra, pace, diritto: una ipotesi generale sulle regolarità del ciclo politico, Giuffrè, Milan, 1982
- G. Miglio, Una repubblica migliore per gli italiani, 1983
- G. Miglio, Le contraddizioni interne del sistema parlamentare integrale, 1984
- G. Miglio, Il nerbo e le briglie del potere: scritti brevi di critica politica 1945–1988, Milan, 1988
- G. Miglio, La regolarità della politica (2 vol.), Giuffrè, Milan, 1988
- G. Miglio, Una costituzione per i prossimi trent'anni, intervista a cura di Marcello Staglieno, Laterza, Bari, 1990
- A. Buchanan, Secessione. Quando e perché un paese ha il diritto di dividersi, introduzione di G. Miglio, Mondadori, Milan, 1991
- G. Miglio, Come cambiare. Le mie riforme, Mondadori, Milan, 1992
- U. Bossi, D. Vimercati, Vento dal Nord: La mia Lega la mia vita, prefazione di G. Miglio, Sperling & Kupfer, Milan, 1992
- G. Oneto, Bandiere di libertà. Simboli e vessilli dei popoli dell'Italia settentrionale, introduzione di G. Miglio, Effedieffe, Milan, 1992
- U. Bossi, D. Vimercati, La Rivoluzione. La Lega: storia e idee, prefazione di G. Miglio, Sperling & Kupfer, Milan, 1993
- G. Miglio, H.D. Thoreau, Disobbedienza civile, Mondadori, Milano 1993
- G. Miglio (con Marcello Staglieno e Pierluigi Vercesi), Italia 1996: così è andata a finire, Mondadori, Milan, 1993
- G. Miglio, Io, Bossi e la Lega, Mondadori, Milan 1994
- G. Miglio, La Costituzione federale, Mondadori, collana Le Frecce, Milan, 1995
- G. Miglio, M. Veneziani, Padania, Italia. Lo Stato nazionale è soltanto in crisi o non è mai esistito?, Le Lettere, Florence, 1997
- G. Miglio, A. Barbera, Federalismo e secessione. Un dialogo, Mondadori, Milan 1997
- G. Miglio e Aa.Vv., Federalismi falsi e degenerati, Sperling & Kupfer, Milan, 1997
- M. Gozzi, G. Miglio, G.A. Zanoletti, Le barche a remi del Lario da trasporto, da guerra, da pesca, e da diporto, Leonardo Arte, Milan, 1999
- G. Miglio, L'asino di buridano, Neri Pozza, Vicenza, 1999
- G. Miglio, Lezioni di politica, two volumes, il Mulino, Bologna, 2011

=== In English ===
- “The Cultural Roots of the Federalist Revolution”. Telos 97 (Fall 1997). New York: Telos Press, pp. 33–40.
- C. Lottieri, Gianfranco Miglio (1918–2001). Telos 122 (Winter 2002). New York: Telos Press, pp. 101–110.

=== Books about Gianfranco Miglio ===
- A. Sensini, Prima o seconda Repubblica? A colloquio con Aldo Bozzi e Gianfranco Miglio, Edizioni scientifiche italiane, Naples, 1986.
- L. Ornaghi, A. Vitale (text by), Multiformità e unità della politica. Atti del Convegno tenuto in occasione del 70º compleanno di *Gianfranco Miglio, 24–26 ottobre 1988, Giuffrè, Milan, 1992.
- G. Ferrari, Gianfranco Miglio. Storia di un giacobino nordista, Liber internazionale, Milan, 1993.
- A. Campi, Schmitt, Freund, Miglio. Figure e temi del realismo politico europeo, Firenze, Akropolis/La Roccia di Erec, Florence, 1996.
- Aa.Vv., Gianfranco Miglio: un uomo libero, Quaderni Padani n. 37–38 della Libera Compagnia Padana, Novara, 2002.
- Aa.Vv., Un Miglio alla libertà, Audiolibro, Leonardo Facco Editore (collana Laissez Parler), Treviglio, 2005.
- D. Palano, Il cristallo dell'obbligazione politica in ID., Geometrie del potere. Materiali per la storia della scienza politica italiana, Vita e Pensiero, Milan, 2005.
- G. Di Capua, Gianfranco Miglio, scienziato impolitico, Soveria Mannelli, Rubbettino, Catanzaro, 2006.
- Aa.Vv., Gianfranco Miglio: gli articoli, Quaderni Padani n. 64–65 of the Libera Compagnia Padana, Novara, 2006.
- Aa.Vv., Gianfranco Miglio: le interviste, Quaderni Padani n. 69–70 of the Libera Compagnia Padana, Novara, 2007.
- A. Vitale, La costituzione e il cambiamento internazionale. Il mito della costituente, l'obsolescenza della costituzione e la lezione dimenticata di Gianfranco Miglio, CIDAS, Turin, 2007.
- L. Romano (text by), Il pensiero federalista di Gianfranco Miglio: una lezione da ricordare. Atti del Convegno di studi, Venezia 17 aprile 2009, Sala del Piovego di Palazzo Ducale, Regional Council of Veneto-Caselle at Sommacampagna, Cierre, Venice, 2010.

== See also ==
- Lega Nord
- Padania
- Umberto Bossi
