= Salvatore Cardinale =

Italian politician (born 1948)

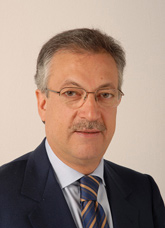
Salvatore Cardinale

Salvatore Cardinale (born 20 June 1948) is an Italian politician.

== Biography ==
Graduated in law in 1972, he practiced the profession of lawyer at the court and the Court of Appeal of Caltanissetta and began political life in the youth movement of the Christian Democracy. In the 1980s he became Mayor of Mussomeli and provincial secretary of the DC of Caltanissetta.

In 1987 and 1992 he was elected Deputy among the ranks of the Christian Democracy and from 1992 to 1994 he was also secretary of the Democratic parliamentary group in Montecitorio. In 1994 he was among the founders of the Christian Democratic Centre, with which he confirmed his parliamentary seat in the elections of 1994 and 1996.

For a short time he was regional secretary of the CCD in Sicily and did not vote for trust to the first Prodi government. In February 1998 he participated in the birth of the Democratic Union for the Republic and was appointed Minister of Communications in the first and second D'Alema governments.

In 1999 he joined the UDEUR of Clemente Mastella but in 2000 he became member of the Italian People's Party and was Minister of Communications in the second Amato government.

With the birth of The Daisy, he was part of the triumvirate which oversaw the construction of the party in Sicily, together with Francesco Piro and Francantonio Genovese, and became its regional secretary.

In view of the general election of 13 and 14 April 2008, he renounced to his candidacy, but obtained the sixth position on the PD list for his daughter Daniela (who was then elected), creating tensions within the party.

In 2014 Cardinale founded in Sicily the Pact of Democrats for Reforms, later renamed Future Sicily.
