= Lega Autonomia Friuli =

Friuli Autonomy League Lega Autonomia Friuli
- Leader: Giancarlo Pedronetto
- Founded: 1993
- Dissolved: c.1998
- Headquarters: Via Selvotta 17, Muzzana del Turgnano
- Ideology: Autonomism; Regionalism

The Friuli Autonomy League (Italian: Lega Autonomia Friuli, LAF) was a political party active in Friuli-Venezia Giulia, Italy.

== History ==
It was founded by the social democratic Giancarlo Pedronetto, already Mayor of Muzzana del Turgnano from 1990 to 1993.

According to the words of the founder, the LAF was a "movement independent from the parties that wants to bring the valors and needs of the Friulian people to the Region and the State".

The party took part in the 1993 regional election in Friuli-Venezia Giulia, obtaining 4.7% of the votes and 2 seats (Pedronetto in the constituency of Udine ed Ennio Vazzoler in the constituency of Pordenone).

In 1994 Pedronetto was named Vice President of the Region and Assessor for work, cooperation, craftsmanship, local autonomies, community affairs and external relationships in the Travanut government.

In 1997 Pedronetto founded the Friuli Union, which was also joined by the regional councilors Mauro Larise and Ezio Sedran.

LAF nonetheless participated in the 1998 regional election but scored only 1.6% of the votes and gained no seats.
