= Luigi Negri (politician) =

Italian politician

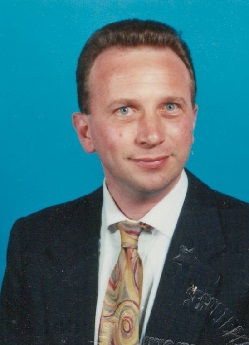

Secretary of Lega Lombarda
- In office 1993–1995
- Preceded by: Umberto Bossi

Italian Chamber of Deputies
- In office 23 April 1992 – 29 May 2001

Personal details
- Born: 4 August 1956 (age 70) Codogno, Italy
- Party: Lega Lombarda-Lega Nord
- Education: Polytechnic University of Milan
- Profession: Politician

Luigi Negri (4 August 1956) is an Italian architect and politician, an exponent of the Lombard League and the Northern League. He served as a member of the Italian Chamber of Deputies from 1992 to 2001. His passion for the history of art led him to deepen, above all, the study of porcelain and to collect it.

At the start of the 13th legislature, the President of the Chamber Luciano Violante invited him, along with a group of other architects deputies, to work out a project for the reorganization of Piazza Montecitorio.
