= Lega Sud Ausonia =

Political party in Italy

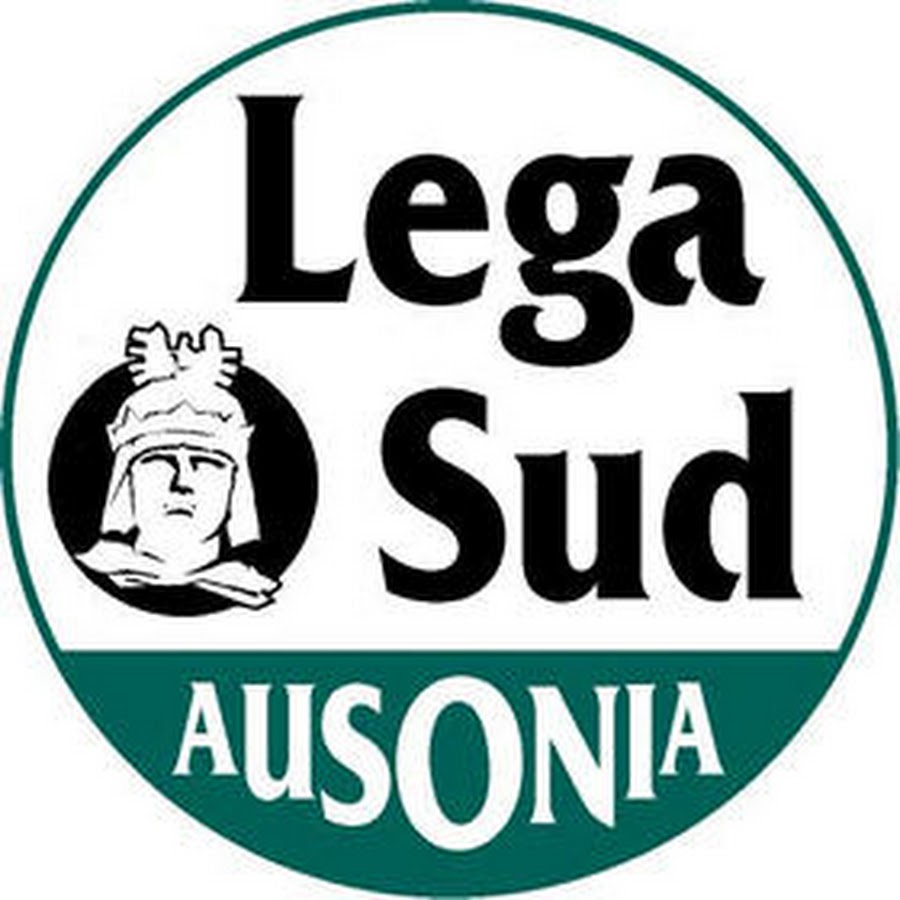
Simbolo della Lega Sud Ausonia

Lega Sud Ausonia (Southern League Ausonia) is a minor independentist political party in Italy.

The party was founded in 1996, as the sister-party of Lega Nord in Southern Italy, and is led by Gianfranco Vestuto. Similarly to Lega Nord's goal of establishing an independent Padania, Lega Sud wants to establish an independent Ausonia, intended as Southern Italy. The party is not represented in the Italian Parliament, the European Parliament, nor in any regional or provincial assemblies. Similar to Lega's Monument to the Warrior of Legnano it uses a bust Holy Roman Emperor Frederick II in their logo.

In the 2001 general election Vestuto was a candidate of Lega Nord in Campania, but after that the two parties distanced themselves and Lega Sud chose to follow an anti-Northern line. In 2010 the party signed a federation pact with the newly formed We the South party. Under this agreement the group of NS in the Chamber of Deputies took the name of Noi Sud/Lega Sud Ausonia.

In the 2015 Campania regional election Lega Sud Ausonia supported the centre-right candidate Stefano Caldoro.

== Leadership ==
- Federal Secretary: Gianfranco Vestuto
- Honorary President: Yasmin von Hohenstaufen
- Official Press Relationship: Francesco Montanino
