= List of members of the Senate of Italy, 1994–1996 =

This is a list of the 326 members of the 12th legislature of the Italian Senate that were elected in the 1994 general election. The legislature met from 15 April 1994 to 8 May 1996.

Senators for life are marked with a "(L)"

== Alliance of Progressives ==
=== Democratic Party of the Left ===
- Aureliana Alberici
- Luana Angeloni
- Silvia Barbieri
- Roberto Benvenuti
- Raffaele Bertoni
- Monica Bettoni Brandani
- Luigi Biscardi
- Massimo Bonavita
- Roberto Borroni
- Diodato Bratina
- Antonella Bruno Ganeri
- Massimo Brutti
- Anna Maria Bucciarelli
- Rossano Caddeo
- Carlo Carpinelli
- Filippo Cavazzuti
- Salvatore Cherchi
- Graziano Cioni
- Aldo Corasaniti
- Ludovico Corrao
- Mario Crescenzio
- Franca D'Alessandro Prisco
- Maria Grazia Daniele Galdi
- Michele De Luca
- Guido De Martino
- Saverio Di Bella
- Ferdinando Di Orio
- Eugenio Mario Donise
- Antonio Falomi
- Giovanni Lorenzo Forcieri
- Carmine Garofalo
- Fausto Giovanelli
- Vito Gruosso
- Luciano Guerzoni
- Ferdinando Imposimato
- Pietro Leonida Laforgia
- Rocco Larizza
- Angelo Lauricella
- Giorgio Londei
- Rocco Vito Loreto
- Silvio Mantovani
- Aldo Masullo
- Silvano Micele
- Gian Giacomo Migone
- Enrico Morando
- Maria Grazia Pagano
- Ferdinando Pappalardo
- Vittorio Parola
- Gianfranco Pasquino
- Enrico Pelella
- Giovanni Pellegrino
- Patrizio Petrucci
- Claudio Petruccioli
- Antonio Prevosto
- Carlo Rognoni
- Cesare Salvi
- Maria Antonietta Sartori
- Concetto Scivoletto
- Osvaldo Scrivani
- Salvatore Senese
- Vincenzo Sica
- Carlo Smuraglia
- Corrado Stajano
- Angelo Staniscia
- Ippazio Stefano
- Glauco Torlontano
- Fausto Vigevani
- Massimo Villone

=== Social Christians ===
- Michele Corvino
- Piepaolo Casadei Monti
- Guido Cesare De Guidi
- Enrica Pietra Lenzi
- Giovanni Russo
- Cosimo Scaglioso

=== Labour Federation ===
- Paolo Bagnoli
- Antonino Valletta

== Lega Nord ==
- Remo Andreoli
- Costantino Armani
- Renato Bastianetto
- Marisa Bedoni
- Giovanni Binaghi
- Rinaldo Bosco
- Erminio Enzo Boso
- Giorgio Brambilla
- Giovanna Briccarello
- Matteo Brigandì
- Massimo Brugnettini
- Erminio Busnelli
- Sergio Cappelli
- Ivaldo Carini
- Gianluigi Carnovali
- Giorgio Cavitelli
- Giuseppe Ceccato
- Pierluigi Copercini
- Gilberto Cormegna
- Biagio Antonio Dell'Uomo
- Massimo Dolazza
- Renato Ellero
- Giovanni Fabris
- Franco Fante
- Pietro Fontanini
- Maurilio Frigerio
- Giorgio Gandini
- Paolo Gibertoni
- Andrea Guglieri
- Gian Luigi Lombardi-Cerri
- Luciano Lorenzi
- Italico Maffini
- Elia Manara
- Donato Manfroi
- Corinto Marchini
- Mario Masiero
- Bruno Matteja
- Gianfranco Miglio
- Giancarlo Pagliarini
- Gianpaolo Paini
- Celestino Pedrazzini
- Valentino Perin
- Luigi Peruzzotti
- Emilio Podestà
- Marco Preioni
- Claudio Regis
- Giovanni Robusti
- Mario Rosso
- Luigi Roveda
- Massimo Scaglione
- Antonio Serena
- Enrico Serra
- Maria Grazia Siliquini
- Francesco Enrico Speroni
- Marcello Staglieno
- Stefano Stefani
- Francesco Tabladini
- Silvestro Terzi
- Roberto Visentin
- Massimo Wilde

== National Alliance ==
- Antonella Baioletti
- Antonio Battaglia
- Umberto Becchelli
- Filippo Berselli
- Francesco Bevilacqua
- Ettore Bucciero
- Francesco Casillo
- Carmine Cozzolino
- Euprepio Curto
- Vito Cusimano
- Paolo Danieli
- Riccardo De Corato
- Vincenzo Demasi
- Domenico Fisichella
- Michele Florino
- Giuseppe Roberto Grippaldi
- Antonio Guarra
- Antonio Lisi
- Giulio Maceratini
- Bruno Magliocchetti
- Erasmo Magliozzi
- Enzo Maiorca
- Ferdinando Marinelli
- Valentino Martelli
- Renato Meduri
- Giuseppe Mininni-Jannuzzi
- Romano Misserville
- Mafalda Molinari
- Marisa Moltisanti
- Antonino Monteleone
- Giuseppe Mulas
- Luigi Natali
- Lodovico Pace
- Riccardo Pedrizzi
- Francesco Pontone
- Saverio Salvatore Porcari
- Cesare Pozzo
- Domenico Presti
- Salvatore Ragno
- Luigi Ramponi
- Filippo Reccia
- Filippo Scalone
- Ferdinando Signorelli
- Giuseppe Specchia
- Pasquale Squitieri
- Giuseppe Turini
- Maria Vevante Scioletti
- Giombattista Xiumè

== Forza Italia ==
- Maria Elisabetta Alberti Casellati
- Giampiero Beccaria
- Silvano Boroli
- Michele Arcangelo Bucci
- Gian Vittorio Campus
- Livio Caputo
- Domenico Contestabile
- Franco Zeffirelli
- Antonio D'Alì
- Doriano Di Benedetto
- Ida D'Ippolito
- Michele Fierotti
- Pier Giorgio Galotti
- Luciano Garatti
- Basilio Germanà
- Enrico La Loggia
- Roberto Lasagna
- Antonio Lorusso
- Adolfo Manis
- Luciano Merigliano
- Giuseppe Nisticò
- Gioacchino Pellitteri
- Gianfranco Petricca
- Cesare Previti
- Roberto Maria Radice
- Paolo Riani
- Ettore Romoli
- Carlo Scognamiglio Pasini
- Francesca Scopelliti
- Gianfranco Spisani
- Sergio Stanzani
- Enrico Surian
- Giulio Mario Terracini
- Cosimo Ventucci
- Giovanni Zaccagna
- Massimo Zanetti

== Italian People's Party ==
- Giulio Andreotti (L)
- Romano Baccarini
- Carlo Ballesi
- Tino Bedin
- Carlo Bo (L)
- Vincenzo Bonandrini
- Nicola Salvatore Borgia
- Giuseppe Camo
- Diego Carpenedo
- Pierluigi Castellani
- Vittorio Cecchi Gori
- Rosario Giorgio Costa
- Romualdo Coviello
- Stefano Cusumano
- Aldo Degaudenz
- Teresio Delfino
- Lino Diana
- Giuseppe Doppio
- Amintore Fanfani (L)
- Mauro Favilla
- Francesco Ferrari
- Gian Guido Folloni
- Aldo Gregorelli
- Luigi Grillo
- Salvatore Ladu
- Michele Lauria
- Severino Lavagnini
- Nicola Mancino
- Aniello Palumbo
- Pietro Perlingieri
- Michele Pinto
- Pietro Tamponi
- Tomaso Zanoletti
- Ortensio Zecchino

== Communist Refoundation Party ==
- Pietro Alò
- Piergiorgio Bergonzi
- Leonardo Caponi
- Antonio Carcarino
- Umberto Carpi
- Aurelio Giuseppe Crippa
- Antonino Cuffaro
- Angelo Dionisi
- Edda Fagni
- Antonio Fischetti
- Luciano Manzi
- Fausto Marchetti
- Angelo Orlando
- Giuseppe Pugliese
- Angelo Antonio Rossi
- Ersilia Salvato
- Rino Serri
- Girolamo Tripodi

== Progressists - Greens - The Net ==
=== Federalist Greens ===
- Francesco Carella
- Enrico Falqui
- Giovanni Lubrano Di Ricco
- Luigi Manconi
- Maurizio Pieroni
- Carla Rocchi
- Edo Ronchi

=== Movement for Democracy - The Net ===
- Anna Maria Abramonte
- Giovanni Campo
- Pietro Cangelosi
- Francesco De Notaris
- Bruno Di Maio
- Carmine Mancuso

== Christian Democratic Centre ==
- Antonio Belloni
- Claudio Bonansea
- Giuseppe Brienza
- Alfonso Capone
- Giuseppe Fronzuti
- Giovanni Gei
- Vincenzo La Russa
- Carmine Mensorio
- Giovanni Mongiello
- Roberto Napoli
- Massimo Palombi
- Luigi Pepe

== Italian Socialist Party ==
- Orietta Baldelli
- Francesco Barra
- Francesco De Martino (L)
- Gianni Fardin
- Carlo Gubbini
- Maria Rosaria Manieri
- Cesare Marini
- Maria Antonia Modolo
- Michele Sellitti
- Antonio Vozzi

== Mixed group ==
=== South Tyrolean People's Party ===
- Karl Ferrari
- Roland Riz
- Helga Thaler Ausserhofer

=== Independents ===
- Giovanni Agnelli (L)
- Norberto Bobbio (L)
- Francesco Cossiga (L)
- Giovanni Leone (L)
- Giovanni Spadolini (L)
- Paolo Emilio Taviani (L)
- Leo Valiani (L)
- Cesare Dujany
- Elidio De Paoli
- Franco Debenedetti
- Pietro Giurickovic
- Libero Gualtieri
- Stefano Passigli
- Giancarlo Tapparo
- Bruno Visentini
- Claudio Magris
