= List of members of the Senate of Italy, 1996–2001 =

This is a list of the 322 members of the 13th legislature of the Italian Senate that were elected on the 1996 general election. The legislature met from 9 May 1996 to 29 May 2001.

Senators for life are marked with a (L)

== Democratic Party of the Left (The Olive Tree) ==
- Gavino Angius
- Giuseppe Arlacchi
- Giuseppe Ayala
- Silvia Barbieri
- Domenico Barrile
- Franco Bassanini
- Giovanni Vittorio Battafarano
- Anna Maria Bernasconi
- Raffaele Bertoni
- Monica Bettoni Brandani
- Luigi Biscardi
- Norberto Bobbio (L)
- Massimo Bonavita
- Daria Bonfietti
- Roberto Borroni
- Diodato Bratina
- Antonello Bruno Ganeri
- Massimo Brutti
- Anna Maria Bucciarelli
- Rossano Caddeo
- Guido Calvi
- Fulvio Camerini
- Antonio Capaldi
- Umberto Carpi
- Carlo Carpinelli
- Bruno Cazzaro
- Graziano Cioni
- Antonio Conte
- Ludovico Corrao
- Mario Crescenzio
- Franca D'Alessandro Prisco
- Maria Grazia Daniele Galdi
- Franco Debenedetti
- Michele De Luca
- Francesco De Martino (L)
- Guido De Martino
- Tana De Zulueta
- Lorenzo Diana
- Ferdinando Di Orio
- Eugenio Mario Donise
- Antonio Falomi
- Elvio Fassone
- Giovanni Ferrante
- Michele Figurelli
- Giovanni Lorenzo Forcieri
- Sergio Gambini
- Fausto Giovannelli
- Vito Gruosso
- Libero Gualtieri
- Luciano Guerzoni
- Rocco Larizza
- Angelo Lauricella
- Luigi Maria Lombardi Satriani
- Rocco Vito Loreto
- Loris Giuseppe Maconi
- Aldo Masullo
- Giorgio Mele
- Silvano Micele
- Valerio Mignone
- Gian Giacomo Migone
- Tullio Montagna
- Enrico Morando
- Gianni Nieddu
- Maria Grazia Pagano
- Ferdinando Pappalardo
- Vittorio Parola
- Alessandro Pardini
- Giancarlo Pasquini
- Stefano Passigli
- Enrico Pelella
- Giovanni Pellegrino
- Patrizio Petrucci
- Claudio Petruccioli
- Giancarlo Piatti
- Ornella Piloni
- Antonio Pizzinato
- Carlo Rognoni
- Cesare Salvi
- Giovanni Saracco
- Maria Antonietta Sartori
- Concetto Scivoletto
- Salvatore Senese
- Carlo Smuraglia
- Vera Liliana Squarcialupi
- Angelo Staniscia
- Palmiro Ucchielli
- Antonino Valletta
- Sergio Vedovato
- Massimo Veltri
- Massimo Villone
- Bruno Viserta Costantini

=== Labour Federation ===
- Felice Besostri
- Antonello Cabras
- Giovanni Murineddu
- Giancarlo Tapparo
- Fausto Vigevani

=== Social Christians ===
- Pierpaolo Casadei Monti
- Guido Cesare De Guidi
- Giovanni Russo
- Luigi Viviani

== Forza Italia ==
- Franco Asciutti
- Antonio Azzollini
- Massimo Baldini
- Giampaolo Bettamio
- Michele Arcangelo Bucci
- Giulio Camber
- Gian Vittorio Campus
- Roberto Centaro
- Domenico Contestabile
- Franco Zeffirelli
- Augusto Cortelloni
- Antonio D'Alì
- Dino De Anna
- Doriano Di Benedetto
- Eugenio Filograna
- Jas Gawronski
- Basilio Germanà
- Mario Greco
- Luigi Grillo
- Enrico La Loggia
- Roberto Lasagna
- Baldassare Lauria
- Salvatore Lauro
- Giuseppe Maggiore
- Vincenzo Ruggero Manca
- Luigi Manfredi
- Adolfo Manis
- Alessandro Meluzzi
- Pietro Milio
- Vittorio Mundi
- Vincenzo Mungari
- Emiddio Novi
- Andrea Pastore
- Marcello Pera
- Enrico Pianetta
- Enrico Rizzi
- Ettore Antonio Rotelli
- Renato Schifani
- Carlo Scognamiglio Pasini
- Francesca Scopelliti
- Nicolò Sella di Monteluce
- Giulio Mario Terracini
- Antonio Tomassini
- Marco Toniolli
- Sergio Travaglia
- Giuseppe Vegas
- Cosimo Ventucci
- Saverio Vertone

== National Alliance ==
- Giuseppe Basini
- Antonio Battaglia
- Francesco Bevilacqua
- Michele Bonatesta
- Giorgio Bornacin
- Furio Bosello
- Ettore Bucciero
- Antonino Caruso
- Carla Castellani
- Giovanni Collino
- Carmine Cozzolino
- Euprepio Curto
- Vito Cusimano
- Paolo Danieli
- Riccardo De Corato
- Vincenzo Demasi
- Domenico Fisichella
- Michele Florino
- Antonio Lisi
- Giulio Maceratini
- Ernesto Maggi
- Bruno Magliocchetti
- Luciano Magnalbò
- Alfredo Mantica
- Italo Marri
- Valentino Martelli
- Renato Meduri
- Romano Misserville
- Antonino Monteleone
- Giuseppe Mulas
- Ludovico Pace
- Mario Palombo
- Adriana Pasquali
- Riccardo Pedrizzi
- Piero Pellicini
- Francesco Pontone
- Saverio Salvatore Porcari
- Salvatore Ragno
- Filippo Reccia
- Francesco Servello
- Giuseppe Specchia
- Giuseppe Turini
- Giuseppe Valentino

== Italian People's Party ==
- Gerardo Agostini
- Tarcisio Andreolli
- Giulio Andreotti (L)
- Tino Bedin
- Carlo Bo (L)
- Pierluigi Castellani
- Vittorio Cecchi Gori
- Romualdo Coviello
- Lino Diana
- Leopoldo Elia
- Bruno Erroi
- Amintore Fanfani (L)
- Luigi Follieri
- Nicola Fusillo
- Nicola Giaretta
- Michele Lauria
- Severino Lavagnini
- Giuseppe Lo Curzio
- Nicola Mancino
- Alberto Michele Montagnino
- Alberto Adalgisio Monticone
- Aniello Palumbo
- Michele Pinto
- Giovanni Polidoro
- Alberto Robol
- Angelo Rescaglio
- Paolo Emilio Taviani (L)
- Patrizia Toia
- Donato Veraldi
- Ortensio Zecchino
- Giancarlo Zilio

== Lega Nord ==
- Michele Amorena
- Renzo Antolini
- Roberto Avogadro
- Walter Bianco
- Guido Brignone
- Roberto Castelli
- Giuseppe Ceccato
- Adriano Colla
- Massimo Dolazza
- Luciano Gasperini
- Vito Gnutti
- Enrico Jacchia
- Luciano Lago
- Luciano Lorenzi
- Elia Manara
- Donato Manfroi
- Francesco Moro
- Luigi Peruzzotti
- Marco Preioni
- Fiorello Provera
- Sergio Rossi
- Antonio Serena
- Francesco Speroni
- Francesco Tabladini
- Francesco Tirelli
- Roberto Visentin
- Massimo Wilde

== Federation of the Greens ==
- Stefano Boco
- Francesco Bortolotto
- Francesco Carella
- Fiorello Cortiana
- Athos De Luca
- Giovanni Lubrano di Ricco
- Luigi Manconi
- Rosario Pettinato
- Maurizio Pieroni
- Natale Ripamonti
- Carla Rocchi
- Edo Ronchi
- Giorgio Sarto
- Stefano Semenzato

== Christian Democratic Centre ==
- Francesco Saverio Biasco
- Francesco Bosi
- Giuseppe Brienza
- Melchiorre Cirami
- Carmine De Santis
- Francesco D’Onofrio
- Franco Fausti
- Ombretta Fumagalli Carulli
- Agazio Loiero
- Riccardo Minardo
- Bruno Napoli
- Roberto Napoli
- Davide Nava
- Maria Grazia Siliquini
- Ivo Tarolli

== United Christian Democrats ==
- Luciano Callegaro
- Giuseppe Camo
- Tancredi Cimmino
- Rosario Giorgio Costa
- Ida Maria Dentamaro
- Giuseppe Firrarello
- Gian Guido Folloni
- Renzo Gubert
- Maurizio Ronconi
- Tomaso Zanoletti

== Communist Refoundation Party ==
- Renato Albertini
- Piergiorgio Bergonzi
- Leonardo Caponi
- Antonio Carcarino
- Fausto Cò
- Aurelio Giuseppe Crippa
- Luciano Manzi
- Fausto Marchetti
- Luigi Marino
- Giovanni Russo Spena
- Ersilia Salvato

== Italian Renewal ==
- Mario D’Urso
- Bianca Maria Fiorillo
- Angelo Giorgianni
- Adriano Ossicini

=== Italian Socialist Party ===
- Livio Besso Cordero
- Ottaviano Del Turco
- Giovanni Iuliano
- Maria Rosaria Manieri
- Cesare Marini

=== Patto Segni ===
- Carla Mazzuca Poggiolini

=== Italian Democratic Movement ===
- Giovanni Bruni

== Mixed group ==
- Armin Pinggera
- Helga Thaler Ausserhofer
- Guido Dondeynaz
- Mario Occhipinti
- Mario Rigo
- Franco Meloni
- Luigi Caruso
- Giovanni Agnelli (L)
- Francesco Cossiga (L)
- Giovanni Leone (L)
- Leo Valiani (L)
- Gianfranco Miglio
- Stelio De Carolis
- Antonio Duva
- Andrea Papini
- Oscar Luigi Scalfaro (L)
