= List of members of the Senate of Italy, 1992–1994 =

This is a list of the 325 members of the 11th legislature of the Italian Senate that were elected on the 1992 general election. The legislature met from 23 April 1992 to 14 April 1994.

Senators for life are marked with a "(L)"

== Christian Democracy ==
- Lucio Abis
- Lorenzo Acquarone
- Giulio Andreotti (L)
- Alfredo Bargi
- Romano Cataldo Forleo
- Angelo Bernassola
- Carlo Bernini
- Carlo Bo (L)
- Ivo Butini
- Paolo Cabras
- Mario Campagnoli
- Umberto Cappuzzo
- Natale Carlotto
- Diego Carpenedo
- Andreino Carrara
- Severino Citaristi
- Giovanni Silvestro Coco
- Maria Paola Colombo Svevo
- Mario Condorelli
- Carlo Costalli
- Francesco Alberto Covello
- Romualdo Coviello
- Stefano Cusumano
- Saverio D'Amelio
- Germano De Cinque
- Vincenzo De Cosmo
- Giorgio De Giuseppe
- Aldo De Matteo
- Salverino De Vito
- Osvaldo Di Lembo
- Mario Di Nubila
- Angelo Donato
- Giuseppe Doppio
- Pietro Fabris
- Amintore Fanfani (L)
- Mauro Favilla
- Bruno Ferrari
- Alessandro Fontana
- Paolo Polenta
- Elio Fontana
- Giovanni Angelo Fontana
- Enzo Zotti
- Armando Foschi
- Luigi Genovese
- Antonio Giagu Demartini
- Giuseppe Giovanniello
- Cesare Golfari
- Luigi Granelli
- Niccolò Grassi Bertazzi
- Antonio Guerritore
- Giuseppe Guzzetti
- Manlio Ianni
- Tullio Innocenti
- Vincenzo Inzerillo
- Rosa Jervolino Russo
- Corradino Di Stefano
- Ezio Leonardi
- Giovanni Leone (L)
- Arcangelo Lobianco
- Enzo Mario Nino Lombardi
- Mino Martinazzoli
- Vincenzo Meo
- Francesco Merloni
- Giovanni Venturi
- Carlo Merolli
- Paolo Micolini
- Pietro Montresori
- Giampaolo Mora
- Antonino Murmura
- Bruno Napoli
- Bruno Orsini
- Francesco Parisi
- Angelo Pavan
- Angelo Picano
- Flaminio Piccoli
- Michele Pinto
- Francesco Pistoia
- Giorgio Postal
- Emilio Pulli
- Giovanni Battista Rabino
- Luciano Radi
- Renato Ravasio
- Delio Redi
- Alberto Robol
- Carmelo Santalco
- Paolo Emilio Taviani (L)
- Antonio Ventre
- Claudio Vitalone
- Giorgio Moschetti
- Giuseppe Zamberletti
- Andrea Zangara
- Ortensio Zecchino
- Giovanni Manzini
- Carmelo Azzarà
- Carlo Ballesi
- Maurizio Creuso
- Giuseppe Giacovazzo
- Michele Lauria
- Daria Minucci
- Franco Ricci
- Vincenzo Russo
- Carlo Tani
- Franco Bonferroni
- Giuliano Zoso
- Salvatore Ladu
- Bruno Lazzaro
- Walter Montini
- Francesco Perina
- Gian Carlo Ruffino
- Riccardo Triglia
- Giovanni Di Benedetto
- Albino Fontana
- Marco Conti
- Giovanni Manzini
- Michele Lauria
- Bruno Lazzaro

== Democratic Party of the Left ==
- Giuseppe Chiarante
- Giglia Tedesco Tatò
- Umberto Ranieri
- Silvia Barbieri
- Anna Maria Pedrazzi
- Carlo Rognoni
- Roberto Benvenuti
- Ivana Pellegatti
- Mario Pinna
- Aureliana Alberici
- Massimo Brutti
- Filippo Cavazzuti
- Gerardo Chiaromonte
- Gian Giacomo Migone
- Adalberto Minucci
- Cesare Salvi
- Concetto Scivoletto
- Giovanna Senesi
- Carlo Smuraglia
- Ugo Sposetti
- Vincenzo Visco
- Elios Andreini
- Luana Angeloni
- Maurizio Bacchin
- Paolo Peruzza
- Monica Bettoni Brandani
- Arrigo Boldrini
- Alcibiade Boratto
- Roberto Borroni
- Diodato Bratina
- Giuseppe Brescia
- Alfio Brina
- Anna Maria Bucciarelli
- Salvatore Cherchi
- Franca D'Alessandro Prisco
- Maria Grazia Daniele Galdi
- Ada Valeria Fabj
- Giovanni Lorenzo Forcieri
- Antonio Franchi
- Carmine Garofalo
- Lorenzo Gianotti
- Fausto Giovanelli
- Pierangelo Giovanolla
- Augusto Guido Graziani
- Francesco Greco
- Luciano Guerzoni
- Luciano Lama
- Giorgio Londei
- Rocco Vito Loreto
- Giuseppe Luongo
- Cosimo Ennio Masiello
- Maurizio Mesoraca
- Francesco Nerli
- Venanzio Nocchi
- Maria Grazia Pagano
- Ugo Pecchioli
- Enrico Pelella
- Giovanni Pellegrino
- Marco Pezzoni
- Terzo Pierani
- Michelangelo Russo
- Marcello Stefanini
- Ippazio Stefano
- Maria Taddei
- Glauco Torlontano
- Graziella Tossi
- Mario Tronti
- Grazia Zuffa

== Italian Socialist Party ==
- Fabio Fabbri
- Gennaro Acquaviva
- Fabrizio Cicchitto
- Franco Castiglione
- Roberto Scheda
- Michele Sellitti
- Massimo Baldini
- Domenico Romeo
- Francesco Cimino
- Mario Giacomo Cocciu
- Achille Cutrera
- Antonio Mario Innamorato
- Antonio Pischedda
- Arduino Agnelli
- Ezio Anesi
- Norberto Bobbio (L)
- Margherita Boniver
- Maurizio Calvi
- Agata Alma Cappiello
- Giorgio Casoli
- Luigi Covatta
- Costantino Dell'Osso
- Francesco De Martino (L)
- Paolo Fogu
- Francesco Forte
- Luigi Franza
- Salvatore Frasca
- Raimondo Galuppo
- Giorgio Gangi
- Luciano Giorgi
- Gino Giugni
- Vittorio Liberatori
- Maria Rosaria Manieri
- Elena Marinucci Mariani
- Vittorio Marniga
- Antonio Muratore
- Luigi Pierri
- Pietro Pizzo
- Nicola Putignano
- Santi Rapisarda
- Franco Reviglio
- Giovanni Ricevuto
- Armando Riviera
- Giorgio Ruffolo
- Giuseppe Russo
- Raffaele Russo
- Gino Scevarolli
- Massimo Struffi
- Antonio Vozzi
- Wolfango Zappasodi
- Sisinio Zito

== Lega Nord ==
- Francesco Enrico Speroni
- Sergio Cappelli
- Marcello Staglieno
- Antonio Serena
- Luigi Roveda
- Luigi Roscia
- Giuseppe Bodo
- Rinaldo Bosco
- Erminio Enzo Boso
- Andrea Guglieri
- Giuseppe Leoni
- Elia Manara
- Donato Manfroi
- Gianfranco Miglio
- Luigi Moretti
- Paolo Gibertoni
- Achille Ottaviani
- Giancarlo Pagliarini
- Gianpaolo Paini
- Claudio Percivalle
- Luciano Lorenzi
- Valentino Perin
- Carlo Pisati
- Marco Preioni
- Massimo Scaglione
- Francesco Tabladini
- Angiola Zilli

== Communist Refoundation Party ==
- Lucio Libertini
- Ersilia Salvato
- Salvatore Crocetta
- Gennaro Lopez
- Angelo Dionisi
- Luigi Vinci
- Giuliano Boffardi
- Virgilio Condarcuri
- Armando Cossutta
- Edda Fagni
- Primo Galdelli
- Roberto Giollo
- Luigi Grassani
- Adriano Icardi
- Luigi Manna
- Luciano Manzi
- Fausto Marchetti
- Luigi Meriggi
- Vittorio Parisi
- Francesco Raffaele Piccolo
- Aldo Sartori

== Italian Social Movement ==
- Francesco Pontone
- Cesare Pozzo
- Ferdinando Signorelli
- Paolo Danieli
- Renato Meduri
- Giuseppe Turini
- Cristoforo Filetti
- Michele Florino
- Bruno Magliocchetti
- Giuseppe Mininni-Jannuzzi
- Romano Misserville
- Marisa Moltisanti
- Antonio Rastrelli
- Giuseppe Resta
- Giuseppe Specchia
- Roberto Visibelli

== Italian Republican Party ==
- Libero Gualtieri
- Giorgio Covi
- Giuseppe Dipaola
- Roberto Giunta
- Luciano Benetton
- Giovanni Ferrara
- Vincenzo Garraffa
- Antonio Maccanico
- Giovanni Spadolini (L)
- Armando Stefanelli
- Leo Valiani (L)
- Bruno Visentini

== Greens/The Net ==
- Carla Rocchi
- Carmine Mancuso
- Emilio Molinari
- Girolamo Cannariato
- Vito Ferrara
- Giuseppina Maisano Grassi
- Annamaria Procacci

== Italian Liberal Party ==
- Luigi Compagna
- Giacomo Paire
- Francesco Candioto
- Valentino Martelli
- Carlo Scognamiglio

== Mixed group ==
- Roland Riz
- Luigi Biscardi
- Giovanni Agnelli (L)
- Vincenza Bono Parrino
- Francesco Candioto
