= List of members of the Senate of Italy, 2001–2006 =

This is a list of the 320 members of the 14th legislature of the Italian Senate that were elected in the 2001 general election. The legislature met from 30 May 2001 to 27 April 2006.

Senators for life are marked with a "(L)"

== Forza Italia ==
- Antonio Agogliati
- Maria Elisabetta Alberti Casellati
- Roberto Antonione
- Giacomo Archiutti
- Franco Asciutti
- Antonio Azzollini
- Massimo Baldini
- Paolo Barelli
- Filadelfio Guido Basile
- Laura Bianconi
- Giampaolo Bettamio
- Gabriele Boscetto
- Giulio Camber
- Gianpiero Carlo Cantoni
- Guglielmo Castagnetti
- Roberto Centaro
- Francesco Chirilli
- Angelo Maria Cicolani
- Romano Comincioli
- Domenico Contestabile
- Rosario Giorgio Costa
- Antonio D'Alì
- Alfredo D'Ambrosio
- Giuseppe Degennaro
- Marcello Dell'Utri
- Walter De Rigo
- Ida D'Ippolito
- Luigi Fabbri
- Luciano Falcier
- Gaetano Fasolino
- Gian Pietro Favaro
- Pasqualino Lorenzo Federici
- Mario Francesco Ferrara
- Giuseppe Firrarello
- Aventino Frau
- Antonio Gentile
- Antonio Franco Girfatti
- Pasquale Giuliano
- Mario Greco
- Luigi Grillo
- Vittorio Guasti
- Furio Gubetti
- Paolo Guzzanti
- Raffaele Iannuzzi
- Maria Claudia Ioannucci
- Cosimo Izzo
- Enrico La Loggia
- Salvatore Lauro
- Guido Mainardi
- Lucio Malan
- Luigi Manfredi
- Ignazio Manunza
- Salvatore Marano
- Riccardo Minardo
- Carmelo Morra
- Pasquale Nessa
- Emiddio Novi
- Giuseppe Onorato Benito Nocco
- Liborio Ognibene
- Antonio Domenico Pasinato
- Andrea Pastore
- Marcello Pera
- Vittorio Pessina
- Enrico Pianetta
- Lorenzo Piccioni
- Egidio Luigi Ponzo
- Enrico Rizzi
- Rocco Salini
- Stanislao Alessandro Sambin
- Sebastiano Sanzarello
- Renato Schifani
- Aldo Scarabosio
- Grazia Sestini
- Luigi Scotti
- Flavio Tredese
- Antonio Tomassini
- Sergio Travaglia
- Giuseppe Vegas
- Cosimo Ventucci
- Carlo Vizzini
- Guido Ziccone
- Alberto Pietro Maria Zorzoli

== Democrats of the Left ==
- Maria Chiara Acciarini
- Gavino Angius
- Giuseppe Maria Ayala
- Fabio Baratella
- Franco Bassanini
- Marcello Basso
- Giovanni Vittorio Battafarano
- Giovanni Battaglia
- Luigi Berlinguer
- Norberto Bobbio (L)
- Massimo Bonavita
- Daria Bonfietti
- Monica Bettoni Brandani
- Giovanni Brunale
- Massimo Brutti
- Paolo Brutti
- Milos Budin
- Rossano Caddeo
- Guido Calvi
- Franco Chiusoli
- Franco Debenedetti
- Francesco De Martino (L)
- Leopoldo Di Girolamo
- Piero Di Siena
- Tana De Zulueta
- Antonio Falomi
- Elvio Fassone
- Angelo Flammia
- Giovanni Lorenzo Forcieri
- Vittoria Franco
- Costantino Garraffa
- Mario Gasbarri
- Fausto Giovannelli
- Vito Gruosso
- Luciano Guerzoni
- Antonio Iovene
- Aleandro Longhi
- Loris Giuseppe Maconi
- Andrea Manzella
- Alberto Maritati
- Giuseppe Mascioni
- Accursio Montalbano
- Esterino Montino
- Enrico Morando
- Giovanni Pietro Murineddu
- Gianni Nieddu
- Maria Grazia Pagano
- Gaetano Pascarella
- Giancarlo Pasquini
- Stefano Passigli
- Claudio Petruccioli
- Giancarlo Piatti
- Ornella Piloni
- Antonio Pizzinato
- Antonio Rotondo
- Cesare Salvi
- Rosa Stanisci
- Fulvio Tessitore
- Giorgio Tonini
- Lanfranco Turci
- Antonio Vicini
- Massimo Villone
- Bruno Viserta Costantini
- Walter Vitali
- Luigi Viviani

== National Alliance ==
- Alberto Balboni
- Antonio Battaglia
- Francesco Bevilacqua
- Luigi Bobbio
- Michele Bonatesta
- Giuseppe Bongiorno
- Ettore Bucciero
- Antonino Caruso
- Giovanni Collino
- Giuseppe Consolo
- Carmine Cozzolino
- Cesare Cursi
- Euprepio Curto
- Paolo Danieli
- Riccardo De Corato
- Mariano Delogu
- Vincenzo Demasi
- Domenico Fisichella
- Michele Florino
- Lamberto Grillotti
- Domenico Kappler
- Luciano Magnalbò
- Alfredo Mantica
- Alberto Felice Simone Massucco
- Renato Meduri
- Giuseppe Menardi
- Franco Mugnai
- Giuseppe Mulas
- Domenico Nania
- Lodovico Pace
- Mario Palombo
- Riccardo Pedrizzi
- Piero Pellicini
- Francesco Pontone
- Salvatore Ragno
- Roberto Salerno
- Learco Saporito
- Giuseppe Semeraro
- Franco Servello
- Maria Grazia Siliquini
- Giuseppe Specchia
- Filomeno Biagio Tatò
- Giuseppe Valditara
- Lucio Zappacosta

== Democracy is Freedom - The Daisy ==
- Stefano Bastianoni
- Alessandro Battisti
- Tino Bedin
- Carlo Bo (L)
- Willer Bordon
- Renato Cambursano
- Pierluigi Castellani
- Mario Cavallaro
- Tommaso Coletti
- Romualdo Coviello
- Nando Dalla Chiesa
- Natale D'Amico
- Giampaolo D'Andrea
- Franco Danieli
- Cinzia Dato
- Ida Maria Dentamaro
- Bruno Dettori
- Lamberto Dini
- Emanuela Baio Dossi
- Mauro Fabris
- Nicodemo Francesco Filippelli
- Aniello Formisano
- Antonio Gaglione
- Paolo Giaretta
- Michele Lauria
- Severino Lavagnini
- Ettore Liguori
- Marina Magistrelli
- Nicola Mancino
- Roberto Manzione
- Antonio Michele Montagnino
- Alberto Adalgiso Monticone
- Egidio Enrico Pedrini
- Pierluigi Petrini
- Franco Righetti
- Andrea Rigoni
- Giuseppe Scalera
- Albertina Soliani
- Paolo Emilio Taviani (L)
- Patrizia Toia
- Tiziano Treu
- Giuseppe Vallone
- Donato Tommaso Veraldi

== Whiteflower ==
=== Christian Democratic Centre ===
- Ugo Bergamo
- Francesco Bosi
- Luciano Callegaro
- Pietro Cherchi
- Luigi Compagna
- Corrado Danzi
- Francesco D'Onofrio
- Alessandro Forlani
- Michele Forte
- Graziano Maffioli
- Gianluigi Magri
- Salvatore Meleleo
- Gino Moncada
- Gaetano Antonio Pellegrino
- Maurizio Ronconi
- Calogero Sodano
- Domenico Sudano
- Ivo Tarolli
- Gino Trematerra
- Gianfranco Tunis
- Tomaso Zanoletti

=== United Christian Democrats ===
- Leonzio Borea
- Amedeo Ciccanti
- Melchiorre Cirami
- Mauro Cutrufo
- Maurizio Eufemi
- Giuseppe Gaburro
- Renzo Gubert
- Antonio Iervolino

== Lega Nord ==
- Sergio Agoni
- Rossana Boldi
- Guido Brignone
- Roberto Calderoli
- Roberto Castelli
- Umberto Chincarini
- Andrea Corrado
- Paolo Franco
- Cesarino Monti
- Francesco Moro
- Celestino Pedrazzini
- Luigi Peruzzotti
- Ettore Pirovano
- Fiorello Provera
- Piergiorgio Stiffoni
- Francesco Tirelli
- Antonio Gianfranco Vanzo

== Federation of the Greens ==
- Stefano Boco
- Francesco Carella
- Fiorello Cortiana
- Loredana De Petris
- Anna Donati
- Francesco Martone
- Angelo Muzio
- Natale Ripamonti
- Sauro Turroni
- Giampaolo Zancan

== Per le Autonomie ==
- Gianni Agnelli (L)
- Giulio Andreotti (L)
- Mauro Betta
- Renzo Michelini

=== South Tyrolean People's Party ===
- Helga Thaler Ausserhofer
- Alois Kofler
- Oskar Peterlini

=== Valdostan Union ===
- Augusto Rollandin

=== European Democracy ===
- Giuseppe Ruvolo
- Francesco Salzano

== Mixed group ==
=== Italian Democratic Socialists ===
- Cesare Marini
- Tommaso Casillo
- Giovanni Crema
- Ottaviano Del Turco
- Gerardo Labellarte
- Maria Rosaria Manieri

=== Communist Refoundation Party ===
- Luigi Malabarba
- Giorgio Malentacchi
- Tommaso Sodano
- Livio Togni

=== Party of Italian Communists ===
- Luigi Marino
- Gianfranco Pagliarulo

=== League for Lombard Autonomy ===
- Elidio De Paoli

=== New Italian Socialist Party ===
- Francesco Antonio Crinò

=== Italian Republican Party ===
- Antonio Del Pennino

=== Tricolour Flame ===
- Luigi Caruso

=== Movimento Territorio Lombardo ===
- Valerio Carrara

=== Libertà e Giustizia per l'Ulivo ===
- Achille Occhetto

== Independents ==
- Giuliano Amato
- Francesco Cossiga (L)
- Giovanni Leone (L)
- Oscar Luigi Scalfaro (L)
- Sergio Zavoli
- Sergio Pininfarina (L)
