= List of mayors of Carbonia =

Mayor of Carbonia
- Sindaco di Carbonia
- Incumbent; Pietro Morittu since 13 October 2021
- Appointer: Popular election
- Term length: 5 years, renewable once
- Website: Official website

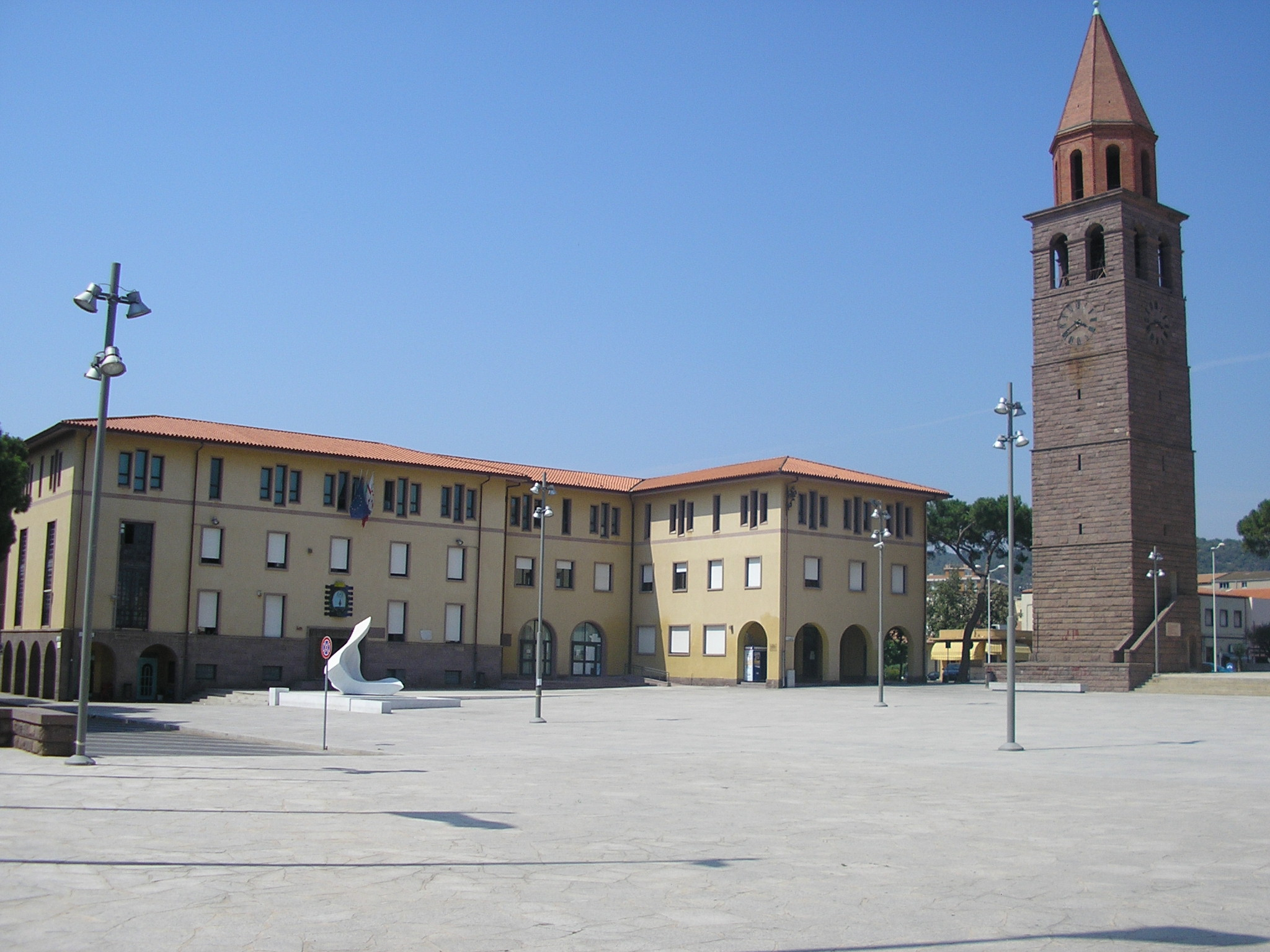
Carbonia's Town Hall.

The mayor of Carbonia is an elected politician who, along with the Carbonia's city council, is accountable for the strategic government of Carbonia in Sardinia, Italy.

The current mayor is Pietro Morittu (PD), who took office on 13 October 2021.

== Overview ==
According to the Italian Constitution, the mayor of Carbonia is member of the City Council.

The mayor is elected by the population of Carbonia, who also elects the members of the City Council, controlling the mayor's policy guidelines and is able to enforce his resignation by a motion of no confidence. The mayor is entitled to appoint and release the members of his government.

Since 1993 the mayor is elected directly by Carbonia's electorate: in all mayoral elections in Italy in cities with a population higher than 15,000 the voters express a direct choice for the mayor or an indirect choice voting for the party of the candidate's coalition. If no candidate receives at least 50% of votes, the top two candidates go to a second round after two weeks. The election of the City Council is based on a direct choice for the candidate with a preference vote: the candidate with the majority of the preferences is elected. The number of the seats for each party is determined proportionally.

== Italian Republic (since 1946) ==
=== City Council election (1946-1993) ===
From 1946 to 1993, the Mayor of Carbonia was elected by the City Council.

| | Mayor | Term start | Term end | Party |
|---|---|---|---|---|
| 1 | Renato Mistroni | 7 April 1946 | 1 August 1948 | PCI |
| 2 | Tullio Mascia | 1 August 1948 | 11 October 1948 | PCI |
| 3 | Roberto Orani | 11 October 1948 | 27 May 1949 | PCI |
Special Prefectural Commissioner tenure (27 May 1949 – 1 April 1953)
| 4 | Pietro Cocco | 1 April 1953 | 2 August 1954 | PCI |
| 5 | Umberto Giganti | 2 August 1954 | 26 May 1956 | PCI |
| (6) | Pietro Cocco | 27 May 1956 | 2 January 1959 | PCI |
| 7 | Pietro Doneddu | 2 January 1959 | 26 July 1963 | PCI |
| 8 | Antonio Saba | 26 July 1963 | 26 January 1965 | PCI |
| 9 | Aldo Lai | 26 January 1965 | 22 November 1967 | PSI |
Special Prefectural Commissioner tenure (22 November 1967 – 7 January 1969)
| (6) | Pietro Cocco | 7 January 1969 | 14 March 1983 | PCI |
| 10 | Bruno Ugo Piano | 14 March 1983 | 27 August 1990 | PCI |
| 11 | Antonangelo Casula | 27 August 1990 | 22 June 1993 | PDS |

=== Direct election (since 1993) ===
Since 1993, under provisions of new local administration law, the Mayor of Carbonia is chosen by direct election, originally every four, then every five years.

| | Mayor | Term start | Term end | Party | Coalition | Election |
|---|---|---|---|---|---|---|
| (11) | Antonangelo Casula | 22 June 1993 | 12 May 1997 | PDS; DS | PDS • PSI | 1993 |
| (11) | Antonangelo Casula | 12 May 1997 | 15 March 2001 (Note: Resigned in order to participate to the national general election.) | PDS; DS | DS • PPI | 1997 |
Special Prefectural Commissioner tenure (15 March 2001 – 28 May 2001)
| 12 | Salvatore Cherchi | 28 May 2001 | 13 June 2006 | DS; PD | DS • DL • PRC • SDI | 2001 |
| 12 | Salvatore Cherchi | 13 June 2006 | 16 July 2010 (Note: Reisgned after being elected President of the Province of Carbonia-Iglesias. The deputy mayor Maria Marongiu (PD) held the office till a new municipal election was held.) | DS; PD | DS • DL • PRC • PdCI | 2006 |
| 13 | Giuseppe Casti | 23 May 2011 | 20 June 2016 | PD | PD • SEL • FdS | 2011 |
| 14 | Paola Massidda | 20 June 2016 | 13 October 2021 | M5S | M5S | 2016 |
| 15 | Pietro Morittu | 13 October 2021 (Note: Election originally scheduled for June 2021 then postponed due to the Coronavirus pandemic.) | Incumbent | PD | PD • PSd'Az | 2021 |
