= 2016 Italian local elections =

The 2016 Italian local elections were held on 5 June, with a run-off, where necessary if a candidate for Mayor obtained less than 50 percent of votes in the first round, held on 19 June.

In Trentino-Alto Adige the elections were held on 8 May (second round on 22 May), in Aosta Valley on 15 May. Municipal councilors and mayors ordinarily serve a term of five years.

== Voting system ==
All mayoral elections in Italy in cities with a population higher than 15,000 use the same system.

Under this system voters express a direct choice for the mayor or an indirect choice voting for one of the parties of the candidate's coalition. If no candidate receives a majority of votes, the top two candidates go to a second round two weeks later. The coalition of the elected mayor is guaranteed a majority of seats in the council with the attribution of extra seats, but the majority bonus system is not adopted by the cities of Trentino-Alto Adige. If a Mayor resigns, dies or is ousted from office after more than half the municipal councillors stepped down, an early municipal election (for the Mayor and for all municipal councillors) is called.

The City Council is elected at the same time as the mayor. Voters can vote for a list of candidates and can express up to two preferences for candidates of said list. In case of two preferences, they must be given to candidates of both genders. Seats are the attributed to parties proportionally, and for each party the candidates with the highest number of preferences are elected.

== Results ==
=== Overall results ===
Majority of each coalition in 149 municipalities (comuni) with a population higher than 15,000:

Coalition	Comuni
Centre-right coalition	37
Centre-left coalition	23
Five Star Movement	21
Left-wing coalition	5

Notes: almost all political parties and coalitions in local (municipal and regional) elections usually run with the support of some minor allied list active in local politics forming coalitions under the same nominee as the mayoral candidate, only M5S ran in all elections with a single list (that is the M5S list with its mayoral candidate without forming coalitions with minor local lists or other national parties). A civic list (lista civica) is a local list.

By party

Party votes in the main 132 municipalities:

Party	votes	%
Democratic Party	949,510	18.8%
Five Star Movement	878,828	17.4%
Italian Left and allies	407,915	8.1%
Forza Italia	366,456	7.2%
Northern League	260,511	5.2%
Brothers of Italy	230,554	4.6%
New Centre-Right – Union of the Centre	103,020	2.0%
Other centre-left lists	610,548	12.1%
Other centre-right lists	466,483	9.2%
Other right-wing lists	140,477	2.8%
Other left-wing lists	102,496	2.0%
Other centrist lists	96,435	1.9%
Others	444,442	8.8%

By coalition

Coalition results in the main municipalities:

Coalition	Votes	%
Centre-left coalition	1,736,776	32.2%
Centre-right coalition	1,155,106	21.4%
Five Star Movement	989,610	18.4%
Left-wing coalition	459,445	8.5%
Right-wing coalition	446,880	8.3%
Centrist coalition	119,688	2.2%
Others	478,055	8.9%

=== Mayoral election results ===
Centre-left coalition
Centre-right coalition
Five Star Movement
Civic lists
Centrist coalition
Right-wing coalition
Left-wing coalition
Prefectural commissioner

Region	City	Population	Incumbent mayor	Elected mayor	1st round		2nd round		Seats	Source
Region	City	Population	Incumbent mayor	Elected mayor	Votes	%	Votes	%	Seats	Source
Piedmont	Novara	104,388	Andrea Ballarè (PD)	Alessandro Canelli (LN)	15,258	32.77%	23,155	57.77%	20 / 32	
Piedmont	Turin	892,649	Piero Fassino (PD)	Chiara Appendino (M5S)	118,273	30.92%	202,764	54.56%	24 / 40	
Lombardy	Milan	1,343,163	Giuliano Pisapia (Ind.)	Giuseppe Sala (Ind.)	224,156	41.69%	264,481	51.70%	29 / 48	
Lombardy	Varese	79,793	Attilio Fontana (LN)	Davide Galimberti (PD)	14,881	41.95%	16,814	51.84%	20 / 32	
Trentino-Alto Adige	Bolzano	102,575	Michele Penta	Renzo Caramaschi (PD)	9,507	22.32%	17,028	55.27%	19 / 45	
Friuli-Venezia Giulia	Pordenone	50,583	Claudio Pedrotti (Ind.)	Alessandro Ciriani (Ind.)	11,381	45.48%	12,292	58.81%	24 / 37	
Friuli-Venezia Giulia	Trieste	204,590	Roberto Cosolini (PD)	Roberto Dipiazza (FI)	39,493	40.80%	44,845	52.63%	24 / 38	
Liguria	Savona	60,661	Federico Berruti (PD)	Ilaria Caprioglio (Ind.)	8,038	26.61%	12,482	52.85%	20 / 32	
Emilia-Romagna	Bologna	386,386	Virginio Merola (PD)	Virginio Merola (PD)	68,772	39.48%	83,907	54.64%	22 / 36	
Emilia-Romagna	Ravenna	153,740	Fabrizio Matteucci (PD)	Michele De Pascale (PD)	34,077	46.50%	34,058	53.32%	20 / 32	
Emilia-Romagna	Rimini	147,793	Andrea Gnassi (PD)	Andrea Gnassi (PD)	37,391	56.99%	—	—	20 / 32	
Tuscany	Grosseto	78,630	Emilio Bonifazi (PD)	Antonfrancesco Vivarelli Colonna (Ind.)	16,777	39.50%	19,511	54.88%	20 / 32	
Lazio	Latina	117,892	Giacomo Barbato	Damiano Coletta (Ind.)	15,701	22.11%	46,163	75.05%	20 / 32	
Lazio	Rome	2,864,348	Francesco Paolo Tronca	Virginia Raggi (M5S)	461,190	35.26%	770,564	67.15%	29 / 48	
Molise	Isernia	22,025	Vittorio Saladino	Giacomo D'Apollonio (FdI)	3,350	25.14%	5,626	59.00%	20 / 32	
Campania	Benevento	63,489	Fausto Pepe (PD)	Clemente Mastella (FI)	13,266	33.66%	18,037	62.88%	20 / 32	
Campania	Caserta	79,640	Maria Grazia Nicolò	Carlo Marino (PD)	19,590	45.11%	13,598	62.74%	20 / 32	
Campania	Naples	980,716	Luigi de Magistris (Ind.)	Luigi de Magistris (Ind.)	172,710	42.82%	185,907	66.85%	24 / 40	
Campania	Salerno	140,608	Vincenzo Napoli (PD)	Vincenzo Napoli (PD)	53,218	70.49%	—	—	26 / 32	
Apulia	Brindisi	88,355	Cesare Castelli	Angela Carluccio (CoR)	11,872	24.61%	14,798	51.13%	20 / 32	
Calabria	Cosenza	67,679	Angelo Carbone	Mario Occhiuto (Ind.)	24,332	58.95%	—	—	20 / 32	
Calabria	Crotone	58,881	Peppino Vallone (PD)	Ugo Pugliese (UDC)	9,054	26.23%	12,860	59.57%	20 / 32	
Sardinia	Cagliari	154,400	Massimo Zedda (SEL)	Massimo Zedda (SEL)	39,900	50.86%	—	—	21 / 34	
Sardinia	Carbonia	28,882	Giuseppe Casti (PD)	Paola Massidda (M5S)	3,688	21.95%	9,219	61.60%	15 / 24	
Sardinia	Olbia	53,307	Gianni Giovannelli (Ind.)	Settimo Nizzi (FI)	8,330	27.62%	12,698	50.71%	17 / 28	

== See also ==
- 2016 Bologna municipal election
- 2016 Milan municipal election
- 2016 Naples municipal election
- 2016 Rome municipal election
- 2016 Turin municipal election
