= Diorio =

Diorio or DiOrio is a surname. Notable people with the surname include:

- Derek Diorio, Canadian writer and actor
- Dominick DiOrio, American composer and conductor
- Jerry Diorio, American football player
- Joe Diorio, American jazz guitarist
- Nicholas DiOrio, American soccer player
- Ron Diorio, American baseball player
- Tyce Diorio, American dancer
- Verónica Diorio, fictional character from Graduados
- Jeffrey DiOrio, American entrepreneur of Elite Chess

== See also ==
- Ferdinando Di Orio, Italian physician and politician
- Diorios, village in Cyprus
