= Opinion polling for the 2016 Italian constitutional referendum =

An Italian constitutional referendum took place on 4 December 2016. Opinion polling for the referendum was ongoing in the months between the announcement of a referendum and the referendum polling day.

== Opinion polls ==
=== Graphical summary ===
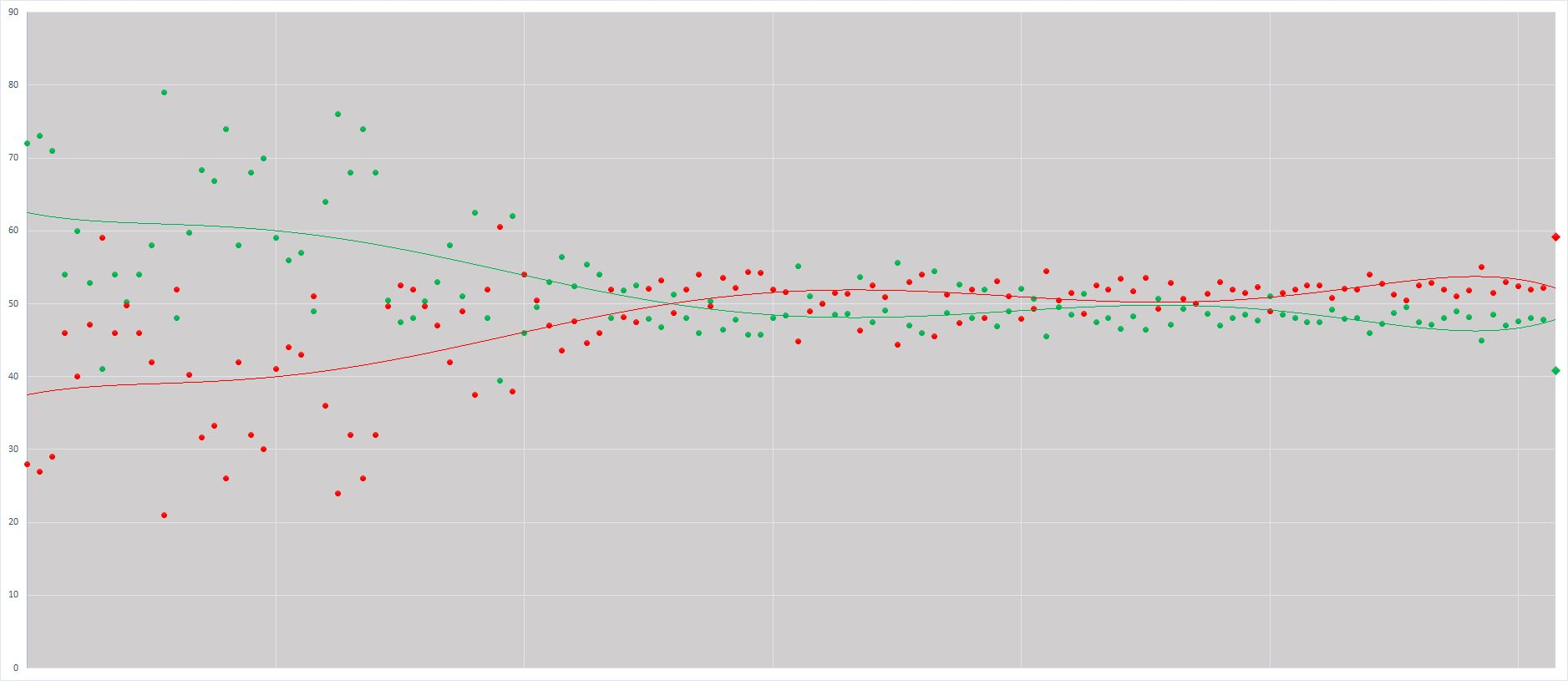

Polling data about the 2016 Italian constitutional referendum.

=== Polls ===
| Date | Polling Firm | Total | | | | Considering only Yes/No vote | | |
| Date | Polling Firm | Yes | No | None / Don't know | Lead | Yes | No | Lead |
|---|---|---|---|---|---|---|---|---|
| 9 Nov 2016 | Index Research | 37.3 | 40.7 | 22.0 | 3.4 | 47.8 | 52.2 | 4.4 |
| 9 Nov 2016 | Istituto Ixè | 37.0 | 40.0 | 23.0 | 3.0 | 48.0 | 52.0 | 4.0 |
| 4–6 Nov 2016 | EMG Acqua | 34.8 | 38.3 | 26.9 | 3.5 | 47.6 | 52.4 | 4.8 |
| 4–5 Nov 2016 | Instituto Tecnè | 39.5 | 44.5 | 16.0 | 1.0 | 47.0 | 53.0 | 6.0 |
| 3–4 Nov 2016 | Demopolis | 35.9 | 38.1 | 26.0 | 2.2 | 48.5 | 51.5 | 3.0 |
| 2 Nov 2016 | Eumetra Monterosa | 26.0 | 32.0 | 42.0 | 6.0 | 45.0 | 55.0 | 10.0 |
| 2 Nov 2016 | Index Research | 38.1 | 40.9 | 21.0 | 2.8 | 48.2 | 51.8 | 3.6 |
| 2 Nov 2016 | Istituto Ixè | 38.0 | 39.0 | 23.0 | 1.0 | 49.0 | 51.0 | 2.0 |
| 28–30 Oct 2016 | EMG Acqua | 34.7 | 37.6 | 27.7 | 2.9 | 48.0 | 52.0 | 4.0 |
| 27–29 Oct 2016 | Istituto Tecnè | 23.0 | 25.8 | 51.2 | 2.8 | 47.1 | 52.9 | 5.8 |
| 27–28 Oct 2016 | ScenariPolitici–Winpoll | 25.2 | 27.8 | 47.0 | 2.6 | 47.5 | 52.5 | 5.0 |
| 26–27 Oct 2016 | Demopolis | 36.1 | 36.9 | 27.0 | 0.8 | 49.5 | 50.5 | 1.0 |
| 26–27 Oct 2016 | Index Research | 39.5 | 41.5 | 19.0 | 2.0 | 48.7 | 51.3 | 2.6 |
| 24–27 Oct 2016 | Demos&Pi | 35.0 | 39.0 | 26.0 | 4.0 | 47.3 | 52.7 | 5.4 |
| 26 Oct 2016 | Eumetra Monterosa | 23.0 | 27.0 | 50.0 | 4.0 | 46.0 | 54.0 | 8.0 |
| 26 Oct 2016 | Istituto Ixè | 37.0 | 40.0 | 23.0 | 2.0 | 48.1 | 51.9 | 3.8 |
| 22–23 Oct 2016 | EMG Acqua | 34.7 | 37.8 | 27.5 | 3.1 | 47.9 | 52.1 | 4.2 |
| 21–22 Oct 2016 | IPR Marketing | 24.1 | 24.9 | 51.0 | 0.8 | 49.2 | 50.8 | 1.6 |
| 21–22 Oct 2016 | Tecnè | 23.3 | 25.7 | 51.0 | 2.4 | 47.5 | 52.5 | 5.0 |
| 21–22 Oct 2016 | Tecnè | 23.3 | 25.7 | 51.0 | 2.0 | 47.5 | 52.5 | 5.0 |
| 21 Oct 2016 | ScenariPolitici–Winpoll | 25.9 | 28.1 | 46.0 | 2.2 | 48.0 | 52.0 | 4.0 |
| 18–19 Oct 2016 | Index Research | 38.8 | 41.2 | 20.0 | 2.4 | 48.5 | 51.5 | 3.0 |
| 17–19 Oct 2016 | Demopolis | 37.2 | 35.8 | 27.0 | 1.4 | 51.0 | 49.0 | 2.0 |
| 18 October 2016 | U.S. President Barack Obama endorses the Yes | | | | | | | |
| 15–16 Oct 2016 | EMG Acqua | 33.8 | 37.0 | 29.2 | 3.2 | 47.7 | 52.3 | 4.6 |
| 15 Oct 2016 | IPR Marketing | 23.3 | 24.7 | 52.0 | 1.4 | 48.5 | 51.5 | 3.0 |
| 14–15 Oct 2016 | Tecnè | 23.5 | 25.5 | 51.0 | 2.0 | 48.0 | 52.0 | 4.0 |
| 14 Oct 2016 | ScenariPolitici–Winpoll | 25.4 | 28.6 | 46.0 | 3.2 | 47.0 | 53.0 | 6.0 |
| 11–12 Oct 2016 | Index Research | 38.9 | 41.1 | 20.0 | 2.2 | 48.6 | 51.4 | 2.8 |
| 12 Oct 2016 | Istituto Ixè | 37.0 | 37.0 | 26.0 | 0.0 | 50.0 | 50.0 | 0.0 |
| 10–12 Oct 2016 | Demopolis | 35.0 | 36.0 | 29.0 | 1.0 | 49.3 | 50.7 | 1.4 |
| 8–9 Oct 2016 | EMG Acqua | 32.3 | 36.3 | 31.4 | 3.0 | 47.1 | 52.9 | 5.8 |
| 5 Oct 2016 | Istituto Ixè | 38.0 | 37.0 | 25.0 | 1.0 | 50.7 | 49.3 | 1.4 |
| 3–5 Oct 2016 | Sondaggi Bidimedia–Bi3 | 23.2 | 26.8 | 50.0 | 3.6 | 46.5 | 53.5 | 7.0 |
| 3–4 Oct 2016 | Index Research | 37.7 | 40.3 | 22.0 | 2.6 | 48.3 | 51.7 | 3.4 |
| 1–2 Oct 2016 | EMG Acqua | 31.4 | 36.0 | 32.6 | 2.2 | 46.6 | 53.4 | 6.8 |
| 30 Sep–1 Oct 2016 | Ipsos SRL | 23.0 | 25.0 | 44.0 | 2.0 | 48.0 | 52.0 | 4.0 |
| 29–30 Sep 2016 | ScenariPolitici–Winpoll | 25.2 | 27.8 | 47.0 | 2.6 | 47.5 | 52.5 | 5.0 |
| 28 Sep 2016 | Istituto Ixè | 38.0 | 36.0 | 26.0 | 2.0 | 51.4 | 48.6 | 2.8 |
| 27–28 Sep 2016 | Index Research | 34.4 | 36.6 | 29.0 | 2.2 | 48.5 | 51.5 | 3.0 |
| 25–27 Sep 2016 | Demopolis | 35.6 | 36.4 | 28.0 | 0.8 | 49.5 | 50.5 | 1.0 |
| 26 September 2016 | The Government announces the date of the referendum | | | | | | | |
| 24–25 Sep 2016 | EMG Acqua | 29.6 | 35.5 | 34.9 | 5.9 | 45.5 | 54.5 | 9.0 |
| 22–23 Sep 2016 | Lorien Consulting | 37.0 | 36.0 | 27.0 | 1.0 | 50.7 | 49.3 | 1.4 |
| 21 Sep 2016 | Eumetra Monterosa | 17.0 | 21.0 | 62.0 | 4.0 | | | |
| 21 Sep 2016 | Istituto Ixè | 38.0 | 35.0 | 27.0 | 3.0 | 52.1 | 47.9 | 4.2 |
| 20–21 Sep 2016 | Index Research | 35.8 | 37.2 | 27.0 | 1.4 | 49.0 | 51.0 | 2.0 |
| 17–18 Sep 2016 | EMG Acqua | 30.1 | 34.1 | 35.8 | 4.0 | 46.9 | 53.1 | 6.2 |
| 14 Sep 2016 | Istituto Ixè | 39.0 | 37.0 | 24.0 | 2.0 | 52.0 | 48.0 | 4.0 |
| 10–11 Sep 2016 | EMG Acqua | 28.5 | 30.8 | 40.7 | 2.3 | 48.1 | 51.9 | 3.8 |
| 7 Sep 2016 | Istituto Ixè | 40.0 | 36.0 | 24.0 | 4.0 | 52.6 | 47.4 | 5.2 |
| 3–4 Sep 2016 | EMG Acqua | 26.9 | 28.4 | 44.7 | 1.5 | 48.7 | 51.3 | 2.6 |
| 31 Aug 2016 | Istituto Ixè | 42.0 | 35.0 | 23.0 | 7.0 | 54.5 | 45.5 | 9.0 |
| 24–26 Aug 2016 | ScenariPolitici–Winpoll | 23.5 | 27.5 | 49.0 | 4.0 | 46.0 | 54.0 | 8.0 |
| 9–11 Aug 2016 | ScenariPolitici–Winpoll | 23.0 | 26.0 | 51.0 | 3.0 | 47.0 | 53.0 | 6.0 |
| 3 Aug 2016 | Istituto Ixè | 45.0 | 36.0 | 19.0 | 9.0 | 55.6 | 44.4 | 11.2 |
| 30–31 Jul 2016 | EMG Acqua | 28.9 | 29.5 | 42.0 | 0.6 | 49.1 | 50.9 | 1.8 |
| 27–28 Jul 2016 | ScenariPolitici–Winpoll | 21.8 | 24.2 | 54.0 | 2.4 | 47.5 | 52.5 | 5.0 |
| 27 Jul 2016 | Istituto Ixè | 44.0 | 38.0 | 18.0 | 6.0 | 53.7 | 46.3 | 7.4 |
| 23–24 Jul 2016 | EMG Acqua | 28.5 | 30.1 | 41.4 | 1.6 | 48.6 | 51.4 | 2.8 |
| 16–17 Jul 2016 | EMG Acqua | 27.8 | 29.5 | 42.7 | 1.7 | 48.5 | 51.5 | 3.0 |
| 16–18 Jul 2016 | Demopolis | 37.0 | 37.0 | 26.0 | 0.0 | 50.0 | 50.0 | 0.0 |
| 12–13 Jul 2016 | Ipsos SRL | 26.0 | 25.0 | 49.0 | 1.0 | 51.0 | 49.0 | 2.0 |
| 11 Jul 2016 | Demos&Pi | 37.0 | 30.0 | 33.0 | 7.0 | 55.2 | 44.8 | 10.4 |
| 9–10 Jul 2016 | EMG Acqua | 26.9 | 28.7 | 44.4 | 1.8 | 48.4 | 51.6 | 3.2 |
| 15 Jul 2016 | IPR Marketing | 24.0 | 26.0 | 50.0 | 2.0 | 48.0 | 52.0 | 4.0 |
| 6 Jul 2016 | Istituto Ixè | 27.0 | 32.0 | 41.0 | 5.0 | 45.8 | 54.2 | 8.4 |
| 4 Jul 2016 | Euromedia Research | 28.6 | 34.0 | 37.4 | 5.4 | 45.7 | 54.3 | 8.6 |
| 2–3 Jul 2016 | EMG Acqua | 27.4 | 29.9 | 42.7 | 2.5 | 47.8 | 52.2 | 4.4 |
| 27 Jun 2016 | Euromedia Research | 29.0 | 33.5 | 37.5 | 4.5 | 46.4 | 53.6 | 7.2 |
| 25–26 Jun 2016 | EMG Acqua | 29.3 | 29.0 | 41.7 | 0.3 | 50.3 | 49.7 | 0.6 |
| 23–24 Jun 2016 | ScenariPolitici–Winpoll | 22.1 | 25.9 | 52.0 | 3.8 | 46.0 | 54.0 | 8.0 |
| 23 Jun 2016 | Istituto Ixè | 34.6 | 37.4 | 28.0 | 2.8 | 48.0 | 52.0 | 4.0 |
| 19 Jun 2016 | Local elections in many important cities (2nd round) | | | | | | | |
| 18–19 Jun 2016 | EMG Acqua | 28.6 | 27.2 | 44.2 | 1.4 | 51.3 | 48.7 | 2.6 |
| 15 Jun 2016 | Euromedia Research | 29.0 | 33.0 | 38.0 | 4.0 | 46.8 | 53.2 | 6.4 |
| 6 Jun 2016 | Euromedia Research | 29.9 | 32.5 | 37.6 | 2.6 | 47.9 | 52.1 | 4.2 |
| 5 Jun 2016 | Local elections in many important cities (1st round) | | | | | | | |
| 3–4 Jun 2016 | Index Research | 42.0 | 38.0 | 20.0 | 4.0 | 52.5 | 47.5 | 5.0 |
| 3–4 Jun 2016 | EMG Acqua | 26.0 | 24.2 | 49.8 | 1.8 | 51.8 | 48.2 | 3.6 |
| 21 May 2016 | Just a Yes campaign officially begins | | | | | | | |
| 18 May 2016 | Istituto Ixè | 33.1 | 35.9 | 31.0 | 2.8 | 48.0 | 52.0 | 4.0 |
| 16–17 May 2016 | IPR Marketing | 32.0 | 23.0 | 55.0 | 4.5 | 54.0 | 46.0 | 9.0 |
| 16 May 2016 | Istituto Piepoli | 41.0 | 33.0 | 26.0 | 8.0 | 55.4 | 44.6 | 10.8 |
| 14–15 May 2016 | EMG Acqua | 26.1 | 23.7 | 50.2 | 2.4 | 52.4 | 47.6 | 4.8 |
| 12–14 May 2016 | Index Research | 44.0 | 34.0 | 22.0 | 10.0 | 56.4 | 43.6 | 12.8 |
| 13 May 2016 | Tecnè | 29.1 | 25.9 | 45.0 | 3.2 | 53.0 | 47.0 | 6.0 |
| 10–13 May 2016 | ScenariPolitici–Winpoll | 29.7 | 30.3 | 40.0 | 0.6 | 49.5 | 50.5 | 1.0 |
| 11 May 2016 | Istituto Ixè | 33.1 | 38.9 | 28.0 | 5.8 | 46.0 | 54.0 | 8.0 |
| 9 May 2016 | Istituto Piepoli | 46.0 | 28.0 | 26.0 | 8.0 | 62.0 | 38.0 | 24.0 |
| 4 May 2016 | Eumetra Monterosa | 17.0 | 26.0 | 57.0 | 9.0 | 39.5 | 60.5 | 21.0 |
| 2 May 2016 | Euromedia Research | 30.0 | 32.5 | 37.5 | 2.5 | 48.0 | 52.0 | 4.0 |
| 29–30 Apr 2016 | Index Research | 50.0 | 30.0 | 20.0 | 20.0 | 62.5 | 37.5 | 25.0 |
| 27 Apr 2016 | Istituto Ixè | 35.7 | 34.3 | 30.0 | 1.4 | 51.0 | 49.0 | 2.0 |
| 26–27 Apr 2016 | Demopolis | 27.3 | 19.7 | 53.0 | 7.6 | 58.0 | 42.0 | 16.0 |
| 20 Apr 2016 | Istituto Ixè | 36.6 | 32.4 | 31.0 | 4.2 | 53.0 | 47.0 | 6.0 |
| 18 Apr 2016 | Euromedia Research | 25.3 | 24.7 | 50.0 | 0.3 | 50.3 | 49.7 | 0.6 |
| 15 Apr 2016 | Euromedia Research | 26.0 | 28.1 | 45.9 | 2.1 | 48.1 | 51.9 | 3.8 |
| 12–13 Apr 2016 | ScenariPolitici–Winpoll | 29.0 | 32.0 | 39.0 | 3.0 | 47.5 | 52.5 | 5.0 |
| 12 Apr 2016 | The Parliament approves the constitutional reform bill | | | | | | | |
| 29 Mar 2016 | Euromedia Research | 26.2 | 25.8 | 48.0 | 0.4 | 50.4 | 49.6 | 0.8 |
| 10–11 Mar 2016 | Index Research | 52.0 | 25.0 | 23.0 | 27.0 | 68.0 | 32.0 | 36.0 |
| 22–25 Feb 2016 | Demetra | 60.0 | 21.0 | 19.0 | 39.0 | 74.0 | 26.0 | 48.0 |
| 22–25 Feb 2016 | Demos&Pi | 50.0 | 24.0 | 26.0 | 16.0 | 68.0 | 32.0 | 36.0 |
| 17 Feb 2016 | Index Research | 53.0 | 17.0 | 30.0 | 36.0 | 76.0 | 24.0 | 52.0 |
| 8 Feb 2016 | Istituto Piepoli | 42.2 | 23.8 | 34.0 | 21.6 | 64.0 | 36.0 | 28.0 |
| 5 Jan 2016 | Euromedia Research | 24.0 | 25.0 | 51.0 | 1.0 | 49.0 | 51.0 | 2.0 |
| 27–28 Jan 2016 | Ipsos SRL | 21.0 | 16.0 | 63.0 | 5.0 | 57.0 | 43.0 | 14.0 |
| 27 Jan 2016 | Istituto Ixè | 45.0 | 36.0 | 19.0 | 9.0 | 56.0 | 44.0 | 12.0 |
| 25 Jan 2016 | Ipsos SRL | 22.0 | 15.0 | 63.0 | 7.0 | 59.0 | 41.0 | 18.0 |
| 23–24 Jan 2016 | EMG Acqua | 34.5 | 14.8 | 50.7 | 19.7 | 69.9 | 30.1 | 39.8 |
| 15–20 Jan 2016 | Index Research | 59.8 | 28.2 | 12.0 | 31.6 | 68.0 | 32.0 | 36.0 |
| 13 Jan 2016 | Istituto Ixè | 44.0 | 32.0 | 24.0 | 12.0 | 58.0 | 42.0 | 16.0 |
| 9–11 Jan 2016 | Demopolis | 60.0 | 21.0 | 19.0 | 18.2 | 74.0 | 26.0 | 48.0 |
| 9–10 Jan 2016 | EMG Acqua | 36.1 | 17.9 | 46.0 | 18.2 | 66.8 | 33.2 | 33.6 |
| 16–24 Nov 2015 | Demetra | 60.0 | 18.3 | 21.7 | 18.3 | 68.3 | 31.7 | 36.6 |
| 9 Nov 2015 | Euromedia Research | 50.0 | 30.4 | 19.6 | 9.8 | 59.8 | 40.2 | 19.6 |
| 30 Oct 2015 | I Vote No campaign officially begins | | | | | | | |
| 14 Oct 2015 | Istituto Ixè | 32.0 | 34.0 | 34.0 | 2.0 | 48.0 | 52.0 | 4.0 |
| 11–13 Oct 2015 | Demopolis | 67.0 | 18.0 | 15.0 | 49.0 | 79.0 | 21.0 | 58.0 |
| 12 Oct 2015 | IPR Marketing | 46.0 | 33.0 | 21.0 | 13.0 | 58.0 | 42.0 | 16.0 |
| 12 Oct 2015 | Tecnè | 41.0 | 35.0 | 24.0 | 6.0 | 54.0 | 46.0 | 8.0 |
| 5 Oct 2015 | Euromedia Research | 32.8 | 32.5 | 34.7 | 0.3 | 50.2 | 49.8 | 0.4 |
| 21 Sep 2015 | Istituto Piepoli | 48.0 | 41.0 | 11.0 | 7.0 | 54.0 | 46.0 | 8.0 |
| 31 May 2015 | Regional elections in seven regions | | | | | | | |
| 11 Mar 2015 | Istituto Ixè | 28.0 | 41.0 | 31.0 | 4.0 | 41.0 | 59.0 | 18.0 |
| 4 Ago 2014 | Istituto Piepoli | 46.0 | 41.0 | 13.0 | 5.0 | 52.9 | 47.1 | 5.8 |
| 7 Jul 2014 | Istituto Piepoli | 53.0 | 35.0 | 12.0 | 18.0 | 60.0 | 40.0 | 20.0 |
| 28-30 Jun 2014 | Lorien Consulting | 29.0 | 21.0 | 50.0 | 4.0 | 54.0 | 46.0 | 8.0 |
| 25 May 2014 | Democratic landslide victory in the European election | | | | | | | |
| 7 Apr 2014 | IPR Marketing | 57.0 | 23.0 | 20.0 | 34.0 | 71.0 | 29.0 | 42.0 |
| 31 Mar 2014 | Istituto Piepoli | 66.0 | 24.0 | 10.0 | 42.0 | 73.0 | 27.0 | 46.0 |
| 31 Mar 2014 | Ipsos SRL | 63.0 | 24.0 | 13.0 | 39.0 | 72.0 | 28.0 | 44.0 |
Source: Sondaggi Politico Elettorali – Italian Government
