= Antonangelo Casula =

Italian politician (born 1958)

Undersecretary of State for Economic Affairs
- In office 17 May 2006 – 6 May 2008

Mayor of Carbonia
- In office 27 August 1990 – 15 March 2001
- Preceded by: Bruno Ugo Piano
- Succeeded by: Salvatore Cherchi

Personal details
- Born: 16 June 1958 (age 67) Carbonia, Sardinia, Italy
- Party: Italian Communist Party; Democratic Party of the Left; Democrats of the Left
- Occupation: Employee

Antonangelo Casula (born 16 June 1958) is an Italian politician who served as Mayor of Carbonia for three consecutive terms (1990–2001) and Undersecretary of State in the Prodi II Cabinet (2006–2008).

Political offices
Preceded by Bruno Ugo Piano	Mayor of Carbonia; 1990–2001	Succeeded by Salvatore Cherchi
