= Paola Massidda =

Italian politician and lawyer

Mayor of Carbonia
- In office 20 June 2016 – 13 October 2021
- Preceded by: Giuseppe Casti
- Succeeded by: Pietro Morittu

Personal details
- Born: 29 August 1965 (age 60) Carbonia, Sardinia, Italy
- Party: Five Star Movement
- Occupation: lawyer

Paola Massidda (born 29 August 1965) is an Italian politician and lawyer.

She joined the Five Star Movement party and became the movement's official candidate for the position of mayor of Carbonia in 2016. She was elected Mayor of Carbonia at the 2016 Italian local elections and took office on 20 June 2016.

== Biography ==
Paola Massidda was born in Carbonia, Italy in 1965. She graduated in law at University of Cagliari in 1991. She decided not to run for re-election in the 2021 elections.

Political offices
Preceded by Giuseppe Casti	Mayor of Carbonia; 2016-2021	Succeeded by Pietro Morittu
