= Manfroi =

Manfroi is a surname. Notable people with the surname include:

- Donato Manfroi (1940–2022), Italian politician
- Franco Manfroi (1939-2005), Italian cross-country skier
