= Galuppo =

Galuppo is a surname. Notable people with the surname include:

- Alberto Galuppo (born 1985), Italian footballer
- Angela Galuppo, Canadian actress
- Raimondo Galuppo (1946–2025), Italian politician
