= Serbariu Coal Mine Museum =

Museum in Sardinia

Coordinates: 39.16043°N 8.4757632°E

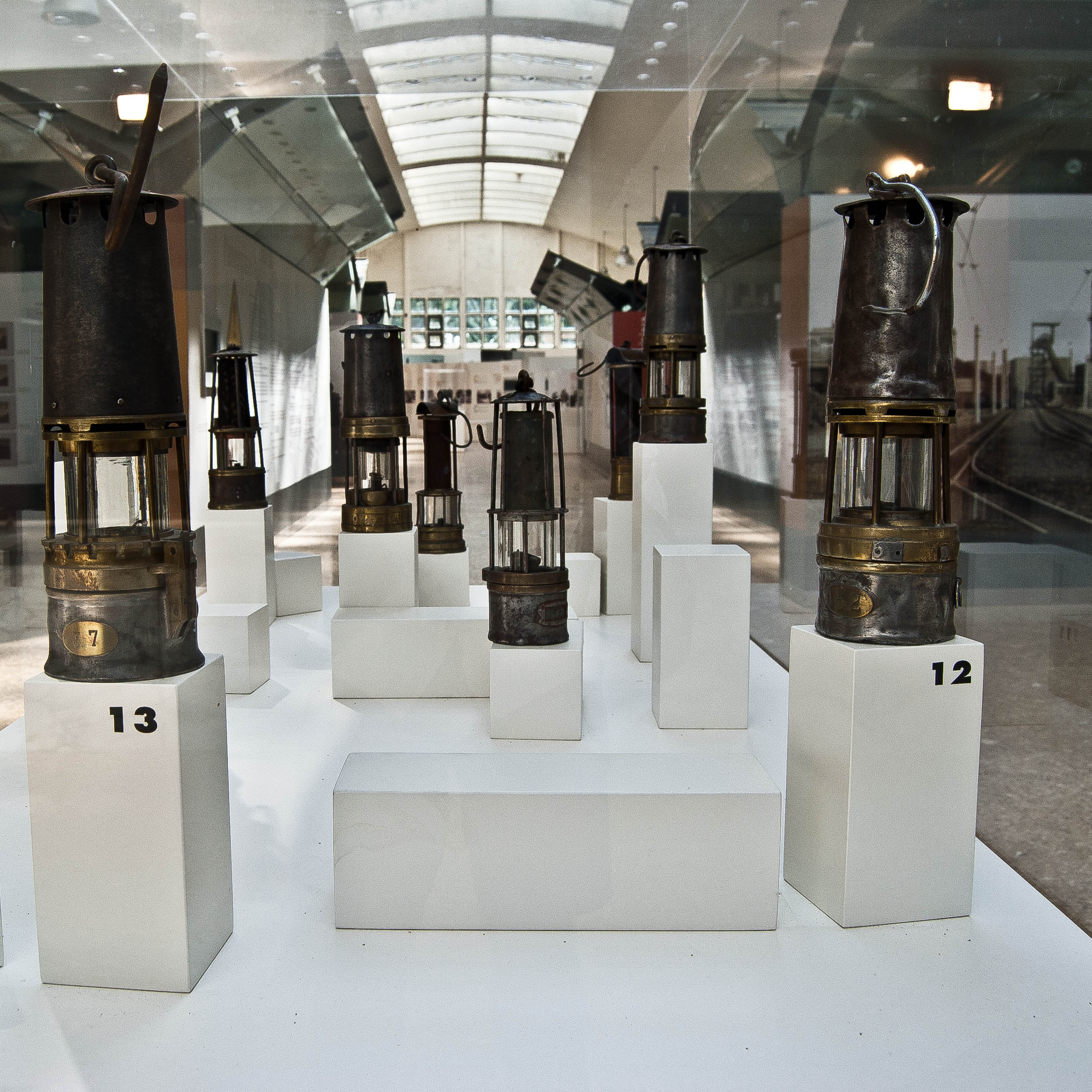
Collection of miners lamps

The Serbariu coal mine museum Italian: Centro Italiano Della Cultura Del Carbone is a mining museum in Carbonia, Sardinia. The museum is an Anchor point on the European Route of Industrial Heritage. The site is a part of the Geomineral Historical and Environmental Park of Sardinia, which is a member of UNESCO's Global Geoparks Network.

== Context ==
The Great Mine of Serbariu was the largest mine in Italy, with 18,000 employees of whom 16,000 were miners. It occupied 33 hectares on the surface and 100 km of underground chambers. It opened in 1937 and was worked until 1964.

== Museum ==
The museum, which opened 3 November 2006, shows the pit head works and an underground gallery with the tools used from the 1930s to the 1950s, and also concentrates on the social history of mining.
