= Salvatore Cherchi =

Italian politician (born 1950)

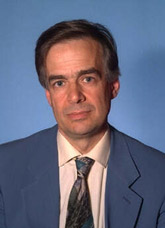

Member of the Chamber of Deputies
- In office 1983–1992
- In office 1996–2001

Member of the Senate of the Republic
- In office 1992–1996

Mayor of Carbonia
- In office 2001–2010
- Preceded by: Antonangelo Casula
- Succeeded by: Giuseppe Casti

President of the Province of Carbonia-Iglesias
- In office 2010–2013
- Preceded by: Pierfranco Gaviano
- Succeeded by: Roberto Neroni (commissioner)

Personal details
- Born: 15 November 1950 (age 75) Banari, Sardinia
- Party: Democratic Party (since 2007)
- Other political affiliations: DS (1998-2007); PDS (1991-1998); PCI (until 1991)
- Education: University of Cagliari
- Occupation: Engineer

Salvatore Cherchi (born 15 November 1950) is an Italian politician who served as Deputy (1983–1992, 1996–2001), Senator (1992–1996), Mayor of Carbonia (2001–2010) and President of the Province of Carbonia-Iglesias (2010–2013).

== See also ==
- List of members of the Chamber of Deputies of Italy, 1983–1987
- List of members of the Senate of Italy, 1994–1996
- List of members of the Senate of Italy, 1992–1994
- List of presidents of the Province of Sulcis Iglesiente

Political offices
| Preceded by Antonangelo Casula | Mayor of Carbonia; 2001–2010 | Succeeded by Giuseppe Casti |
| Preceded by Pierfranco Gaviano | President of the Province of Carbonia-Iglesias; 2010–2013 | Succeeded by Roberto Neroni (regional commissioner) |
