= Province of Carbonia-Iglesias =

Coordinates: 39.1500°N 8.5167°E

- Province
- Map highlighting the location of the province of Carbonia-Iglesias in Italy
- Country: Italy
- Region: Sardinia
- Established: 2001
- Disestablished: 2016
- Capital(s): Carbonia and Iglesias
- Comuni: 23

Government
  - President: Salvatore Cherchi

Area
  - Total: 1,495 km^{2} (577 sq mi)

Population (2001)
  - Total: 131,890
  - Density: 88.22/km^{2} (228.5/sq mi)

GDP
  - Total: €2.048 billion (2015)
  - Per capita: €16,068 (2015)
- Time zone: UTC+1 (CET)
  - Summer (DST): UTC+2 (CEST)
- Postal code: 0781
- Vehicle registration: CI
- ISTAT: 107

The province of Carbonia-Iglesias (Italian: provincia di Carbonia-Iglesias; Sardinian: provìntzia de Carbònia-Igrèsias) was a province in the autonomous region of Sardinia, Italy. It included the historical area of Sulcis-Iglesiente and it was the smallest province of Sardinia. It is bordered by the provinces of Cagliari and Medio Campidano. All three provinces (Carbonia-Iglesias, Cagliari and Medio Campidano) were suppressed by the regional decree in 2016, integrated into the province of South Sardinia before being disestablished in 2025.

As of 2015, it has a population of 127,857 inhabitants over an area of 1,499.71 square kilometres (579.04 mi^{2}), giving it a population density of 85.25 people per square kilometer. The provincial president was Salvatore Cherchi. It had two provincial capitals, Carbonia and Iglesias, with populations of 29,007 and 27,332 as of 2015, respectively.

== History ==
Colonies in the province were established by the Phoenicians and Carthaginians in the 9th or 8th centuries BC. Its mining industry developed during the nineteenth century due to its barium, copper, lead, silver and zinc deposits, but this industry fell into decline after World War II. It was formed in 2001 by a Sardinian regional law and became functional in 2005.

On 6 May 2012 the regional referendums of Sardinia took place regarding the abolition of certain provinces and a variety of other matters. The suggestion of reforming or abolishing certain provinces in Sardinia was approved by the Regional Council of Sardinia on 24 May 2012. Due to this, the province of Carbonia-Iglesias was ordered to form a new administrative body or be abolished on 1 March 2013, but this expiry date for constitutional changes was extended to 1 July 2013. It has not been abolished as a regional law regarding it has not yet been created.

In April 2021, under Sardinian Regional Council's Regional Law Nr. 7, the province was restored, now bearing the name of province of Sulcis Iglesiente (Provincia del Sulcis Iglesiente), named after the historical region where the province is located. Whilst the Italian government challenged the law, thus stalling its implementation, on March 12, 2022, the Constitutional Court ruled in favor of the Autonomous Region of Sardinia. On April 13, 2023, the regional council, at the proposal of the regional government, approved an amendment to the 2021 reform, defining the timeframe and manner of its implementation, which would see its full implementation in 2025.

== Government ==
=== List of presidents ===
	President	Term start	Term end	Party
1	Pierfranco Gaviano	9 May 2005	31 May 2010	The Daisy; Democratic Party; Union of the Centre
2	Salvatore Cherchi	31 May 2010	1 July 2013	Democratic Party
–	Roberto Neroni	1 July 2013	31 December 2014	Special Commissioner
–	Giorgio Sanna	31 December 2014	20 April 2016	Special Commissioner
