= Giuseppe Casti =

Italian politician (born 1964)

Mayor of Carbonia
- In office 23 May 2011 – 19 June 2016
- Preceded by: Salvatore Cherchi
- Succeeded by: Paola Massidda

Personal details
- Born: 18 July 1964 (age 61) Carbonia, Sardinia, Italy
- Party: Democratic Party

Giuseppe Casti (born 18 July 1964) is an Italian politician.

He is member of the Democratic Party. He served as Mayor of Carbonia from 2011 to 2016.

== Biography ==
Giuseppe Casti was born in Carbonia, Italy in 1964.

Political offices
Preceded by Salvatore Cherchi	Mayor of Carbonia; 23 May 2011-19 June 2016	Succeeded by Paola Massidda
