= Giuseppe Doppio =

Italian politician (born 1941)

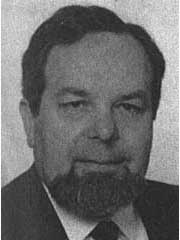

President of the Province of Vicenza
- In office 8 May 1995 – 18 August 1997
- Preceded by: Giuseppina Del Santo
- Succeeded by: Manuela Dal Lago

Member of the Senate of the Republic
- In office 23 April 1992 – 13 July 1995

Mayor of Santorso
- In office 1975–1977
- Preceded by: Giacomo Filippi
- Succeeded by: Romano Thiella

Personal details
- Born: 13 March 1941 (age 85) Santorso, Province of Vicenza, Kingdom of Italy
- Party: DC (until 1994); PPI (1994–2002)
- Profession: Teacher, school principal

Giuseppe Doppio (born 13 March 1941) is an Italian politician and teacher. A member of Christian Democracy and later the Italian People's Party, he served as mayor of Santorso from 1975 to 1977, as a member of the Senate of the Republic from 1992 to 1995, and as president of the Province of Vicenza from 1995 to 1997.
