= Maria Chiara Acciarini =

Italian politician (born 1943)

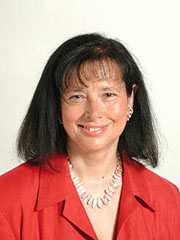

Maria Chiara Acciarini (born 1 October 1943) is an Italian politician.

== Biography ==
Acciarini was born in Torre Pellice on 1 October 1943. With degrees in economics and literature, she has been a teacher of legal and economic subjects and a principal in a high school. From 1988 to 1990, she was part of the secretariat of CGIL School in Turin. Later, she began her activity as an essayist, writing books on the education system and family memoirs. The granddaughter of Filippo Acciarini, a socialist journalist who died in Mauthausen on 2 March 1945, she is dedicated to studying the deportation to Nazi concentration camps; she is a member of the Board of Directors of the Foundation of Memory of Deportation and of the Technical Scientific Committee of the Presidency of the Council of Ministers for the realization of the new Italian exhibition path at Auschwitz. From 2019, she served as the chairperson of the National Committee for the celebrations of the centenary of the birth of Bianca Guidetti Serra (January 2019 - January 2022). As of October 2021, she is a member of the Board of Directors of the University of Turin.

=== Political activity ===
From 1993 to 1996 she was elected as a councilwoman of the Piedmontese capital, where she resides.

Formerly an exponent of the Democrats of the Left, she is among the founders of "Emily in Italia", an association aimed at encouraging women's participation in public life. She was the national head of the "Animal Life" group of the DS and was elected deputy in 1996 and senator in 2001.

From 18 May 2006 to 8 May 2008, she served in the second Prodi government as the undersecretary at the Ministry of Family. In May 2007, she left the DS following the IV congress and joined Democratic Left, which in 2009 merged into Left Ecology Freedom.

In the political elections of 2013, she ran for the Senate with Sel in Piedmont, but was not elected.

Since 2017, she is a member of Italian Left, and she's part of the regional secretariat of the party in Piedmont.

== Writings ==
- (edited by Maria Chiara Acciarini), Filippo Acciarini, Autobiography of a socialist, from Turin to Mauthausen, Rome, Silva Publisher, 1970.
- Chiara Acciarini et al. Universities and research, school, youth policies. Rome, Left ecology and freedom, 2012.
- Maria Chiara Acciarini, Alba Sasso, First of all, the school, foreword by Tullio De Mauro, Milan, Melampo, 2006.
- Onorato Castellino, Maria Chiara Acciarini, The economic world: theories and facts - course of political economy for high schools, Turin, Lattes, 1989.
- Maria Chiara Acciarini, Story of the Guglielminettis. Turin, Robin editions, 2016.
- Maria Chiara Acciarini, Alba Sasso, More school, for everyone, Turin, Abele Group Editions, 2019.
