= Santorso =

- Comune
- Comune di Santorso
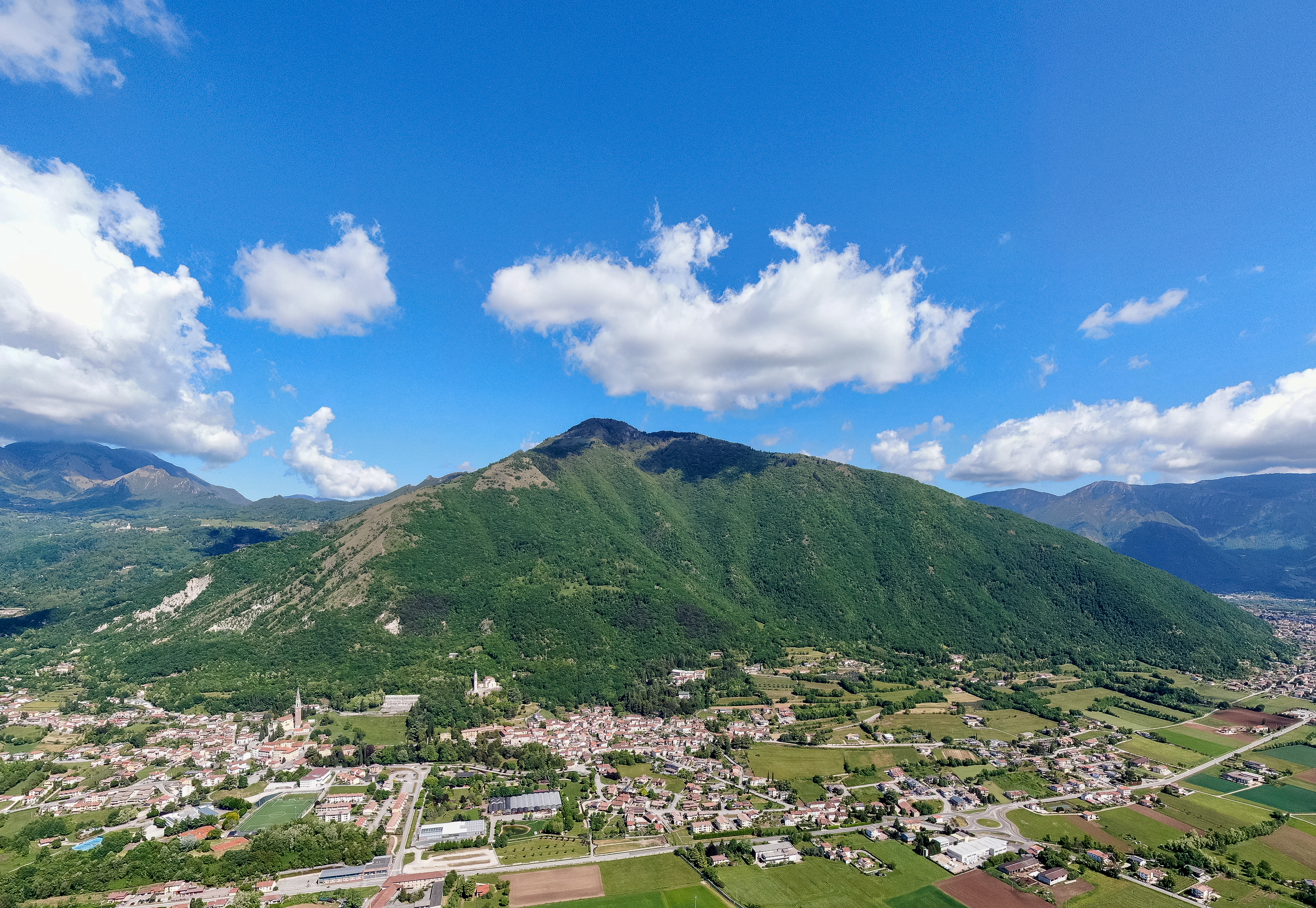
- Aerial view of Santorso with Monte Summano in the background

- Location within Italy Location within Veneto
- Coordinates: 45°44′N 11°23′E
- Country: Italy
- Region: Veneto
- Province: Vicenza (VI)

Government
  - Mayor: Franco Balzi

Area
  - Total: 13 km^{2} (5.0 sq mi)
- Elevation: 240 m (790 ft)

Population (31 December 2014)
  - Total: 5,859
  - Density: 450/km^{2} (1,200/sq mi)
- Demonym: Orsiani
- Time zone: UTC+1 (CET)
  - Summer (DST): UTC+2 (CEST)
- Postal code: 36014
- Dialing code: 0445
- ISTAT code: 024095
- Patron saint: St. Ursus
- Saint day: 3 May
- Website: Official website

Santorso is a town in the province of Vicenza, Veneto, northern Italy. It is north of SP350 highway.

Santorso is home to several patrician villas: the oldest is the Villa Facci which dates to the 15th century. The church of S. Maria Immacolata was built between 1834 and 1839 in neoclassical style.

The Renaissance Villa Floriani houses frescos by the artist Giovanni Demio for display.

The 19th century Villa Rossi is owned by the commune of Santorso and. The annexed park, designed by Negrin, includes an aquarium, rare plants and brooks running through lush vegetation to the main lake. It is home to a large live collection of butterflies in a walk through atrium. The park also features train rides, farm animals and children's play areas.

== Twin towns ==
Santorso is twinned with:

- Vejano, Italy
- Brissago, Switzerland

== Sources ==
- Santorso Guide with photos
- Google Maps
