= Stefano Cusumano =

Italian politician (born 1948)

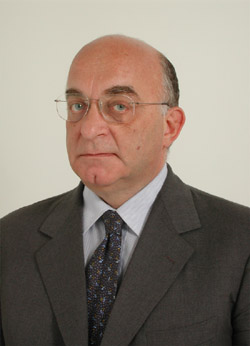
Nuccio Cusumano

Nuccio Cusumano (born Stefano Cusumano; October 16, 1948) is an Italian politician who was appointed to the Italian Senate (April 26, 2006 – April 28, 2008) on the roster of the UDEUR party as one of 30 representatives for the Campania constituency.

Born in Sciacca (Sicily), he has a law degree and has worked as an entrepreneur and a journalist.

In the course of his political career, he has held several government positions, including that of undersecretary of state for the Treasury (then headed by Carlo Azeglio Ciampi) during the premiership of Massimo D'Alema, between 1998 and 1999.

In 1994, as a member of the Italian People's Party (PPI), he helped the then-prime minister, Silvio Berlusconi, to survive a vote of no confidence. He was one of four PPI senators who, against the instructions of their party, physically left the Senate room, rendering the house without a quorum.

In 1999, while a junior treasury minister, he was arrested under allegations of corruption in relation to construction contracts for a hospital in Sicily. In 2007, the court in Catania exonerated him.

On 24 January 2008, in the 2008 Italian political crisis, Cusumano supported the prime minister, Romano Prodi, in a confidence vote, again against the instructions of his party, UDEUR. Another UDEUR senator, Tommaso Barbato, launched into a vicious verbal attack and had to be restrained from physically attacking Cusumano, who appeared to faint and was carried out of the house.

Expelled from UDEUR because of his decision, he joined the Democratic Party. As a candidate in the April 2008 elections, he was not re-elected.
