= Angelo Staniscia =

Italian politician (born 1939)

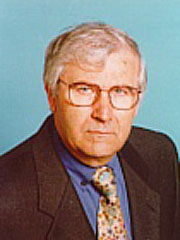
Angelo Staniscia

Angelo Staniscia (born 7 December 1939 in Atessa) is a former Senator of the Republic. He served in the 13th Legislature from 9 May 1996 until 29 May 2001.
