= Roland Riz =

Italian politician (1927–2026)

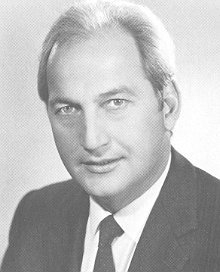

Member of the Chamber of Deputies of Italy for Trento-Bolzano
- In office 5 June 1968 – 1 July 1987
- In office 12 June 1958 – 15 May 1963

Member of the Senate of the Republic of Italy for Trentino-Alto Adige
- In office 2 July 1987 – 8 May 1996

Personal details
- Born: 12 May 1927 Bolzano, Italy
- Died: 12 January 2026 (aged 98)
- Party: SVP
- Education: University of Milan
- Occupation: Lawyer

Roland Riz (12 May 1927 – 12 January 2026) was an Italian lawyer, politician and academic from South Tyrol. A member of the South Tyrolean People's Party, he served in the Chamber of Deputies from 1958 to 1963 and 1968 to 1987 and served in the Senate of the Republic from 1987 to 1996.

Riz died on 12 January 2026, at the age of 98.
