= Raimondo Galuppo =

Italian politician (1946–2025)

Member of the Senate of the Republic of Italy for Adria
- In office 23 April 1992 – 14 April 1994

Personal details
- Born: 27 July 1946; Adria, Italy
- Died: 10 January 2025 (aged 78); Adria, Italy
- Political party: PSI
- Occupation: Sports manager

Raimondo Galuppo (27 July 1946 – 10 January 2025) was an Italian politician. A member of the Italian Socialist Party, he served in the Senate from 1992 to 1994.

Galuppo died in Adria on 10 January 2025, at the age of 78.
