= Massimo Wilde =

Italian politician (1944–2017)

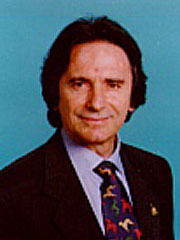
Massimo Wilde: Italian politician

Massimo Wilde (22 May 1944 – 1 November 2017) was an Italian politician.

He was born in Sirmione in 1944. In 1980, Wilde opened a clothing store. He was a co-founder of the Lombardy chapter of Lega Nord, which he represented in the senate from 1994 to 2001. After stepping down at the end of his second term, Wilde became active in the municipal politics of his hometown.
