= Mario Crescenzio =

Italian politician (1942–2024)

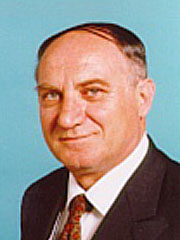
Mario Crescenzio

Mario Crescenzio (5 October 1942 – 3 January 2024) was an Italian politician who served as a Senator. He was born in Arquà Polesine. He died on 3 January 2024, at the age of 81.
