= Luana Angeloni =

Italian politician (born 1952)

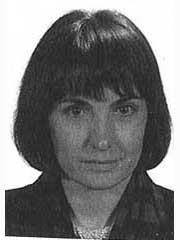

Mayor of Senigallia
- In office April 2000 – March 2010
- Preceded by: Fabrizio Marcantoni
- Succeeded by: Maurizio Mangialardi

Personal details
- Born: 29 October 1952 (age 73) Monterado, Italy
- Party: Italian Communist Party (until 1991); Democratic Party of the Left
- Spouse: Andrea Rodano

Luana Angeloni (born 13 March 1952) is an Italian teacher and politician who served at the Parliament and Senate. She was the youngest Italian woman who held these posts. She was the mayor of Senigallia for two terms between 2000 and 2010.

== Biography ==
Angeloni was born in Monterado on 13 March 1952. She received a degree in teaching. She was a member of the Italian Communist Party. She was elected as a deputy in June 1987 and served at the Parliament during the tenth legislature until 1992. She joined the Democratic Party of the Left in 1991 when the Communist Part was dissolved.

Angeloni was first elected to the Senate in April 1992 and served in the 11th legislature. She was also elected to the Senate for the next legislature in March 1994. In the local elections of 2000 she was elected as the mayor of Sanigallia as part of a centre-left coalition called Civic List. She replaced Fabrizio Marcantoni in the post. Angeloni was again elected as mayor of Senigallia in the 2010 local elections from the Civic List. Her term ended in 2010, and she was succeeded by Maurizio Mangialardi in the post.

She is married to Andrea Rodano.
