= Antonino Valletta =

Italian politician (1938–2022)

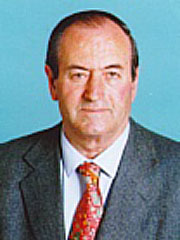
- Valletta in 2005

Member of the Senate of the Republic of Italy
- In office 15 April 1994 – 29 May 2001
- Constituency: Molise

Personal details
- Born: 7 October 1938 Sant'Agapito, Italy
- Died: 21 January 2022 (aged 83) Isernia, Italy
- Party: FL (1994–1998); DS (1998–2000); PS (2000–2001)

Antonino Valletta (7 October 1938 – 21 January 2022) was an Italian politician. A member of the Labour Federation, the Democrats of the Left, and the Socialist Party, he served in the Senate of the Republic from 1994 to 2001. He died in Isernia on 21 January 2022, at the age of 83.
