= Alberto Robol =

Italian politician (1945–2024)

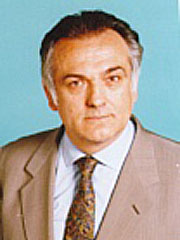
Alberto Robol

Alberto Robol (18 May 1945 – 29 May 2024) was an Italian politician who served as a Senator. He died on 29 May 2024, at the age of 79.
