= Filippo Cavazzuti =

Italian politician (1942–2021)

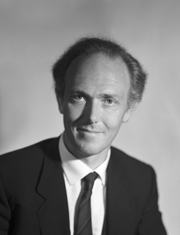
Filippo Cavazzuti

Filippo Cavazzuti (27 April 1942 – 11 July 2021) was an Italian politician who served as a Senator.
