= Salvatore Senese =

Italian magistrate and politician (1935–2019)

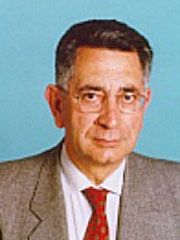
Salvatore Senese

Salvatore Senese (3 April 1935 – 16 June 2019) was an Italian magistrate and politician who served as an MP.

== Biography ==
One of the founders of Magistratura Democratica, of which he served as secretary during the “Years of Lead,” he was later elected to the Italian Parliament for three terms, from 1992 to 2002. He then returned to the Court of Cassation, where he served as section president until 2010.

In 1971, while serving as a magistrate in Pisa, he co-authored, along with Vincenzo Accattatis and Luigi Ferrajoli, the manifesto For a Political Strategy of Magistratura Democratica, which proposed an “alternative use of the law” in order to give effect to the principle of equality enshrined in Article 3 of the Constitution of Italy not always respected by the legislature.

In 1973, he collaborated with Lelio Basso, Guido Calvi, and Gino Giugni to establish the Russell Tribunal to investigate the repression in Chile.

His work within the National Magistrates Association “is primarily responsible for (...) the satisfactory formulation of the regulations governing compensation”.
