= Michele Bonatesta =

Italian journalist and politician (1942–2024)

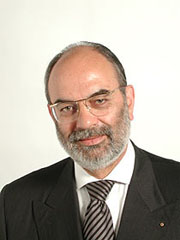
- Bonatesta in 2001

Member of the Senate of the Republic of Italy for Viterbo
- In office 9 May 1996 – 27 April 2006

Personal details
- Born: 23 April 1942 Viterbo, Italy
- Died: 11 January 2024 (aged 81) Viterbo, Italy
- Party: MSI (until 1995); AN (1995–2008
- Occupation: Journalist

Michele Bonatesta (23 April 1942 – 11 January 2024) was an Italian journalist and politician. A member of the Italian Social Movement and the National Alliance, he served in the Senate of the Republic from 1996 to 2006.

Bonatesta died in Viterbo on 11 January 2024, at the age of 81.
