= Giuseppe Turini =

Italian politician (1927–2018)

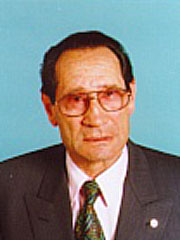

Member of the Senate of the Republic
- In office 16 April 1992 – 29 May 2001

Personal details
- Born: March 10, 1927 San Miniato, Tuscany, Italy
- Died: February 21, 2018 (aged 90) Massa Marittima, Tuscany, Italy
- Party: Italian Social Movement; National Alliance

Giuseppe Turini (10 March 1927 – 21 February 2018) was an Italian politician.

Born in San Miniato in 1927, he represented Grosseto in the Senate between 1992 and 2001, first as a member of the Italian Social Movement and later the National Alliance. He died at the age of 90 on 21 February 2018, at a hospital in Massa Marittima.
