= Ferdinando Di Orio =

Italian politician

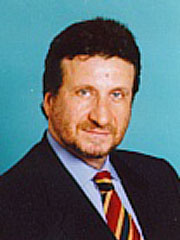
Ferdinando Di Orio

Ferdinando Di Orio (born 23 February 1948) is an Italian physician and politician.

Di Orio served on the 12th and 13th legislatures of Italy from 1994 to 2001 as a member of the Senate. He began teaching at the University of L'Aquila as professor in 1985, and served as rector of the institution from 2004 to 2013, when he was succeeded by Paola Inverardi.
