= Vito Gruosso =

Italian politician (1948–2026)

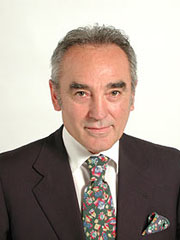
- Gruosso in 2001

Member of the Senate of the Republic of Italy for Basilicata
- In office 15 April 1994 – 27 April 2006

Personal details
- Born: 23 April 1948 San Fele, Italy
- Died: 13 August 2026 (aged 78) Potenza, Italy
- Party: PDS (1991–1998); DS (1998–2007)
- Occupation: Trade unionist

Vito Gruosso (23 April 1948 – 13 August 2026) was an Italian politician. A member of the Democratic Party of the Left and the Democrats of the Left, he served in the Senate of the Republic from 1994 to 2006.

Gruosso died on 13 August 2026, at the age of 78.
