= Luigi Biscardi =

Italian politician (1928–2019)

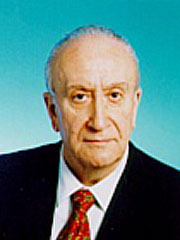
Luigi Biscardi

Luigi Biscardi (13 September 1928 – 2 June 2019) was an Italian politician who served as a Senator.

Born in Larino, he lived in Campobasso, where he was for years the principal of the "Mario Pagano" Classical Lyceum. In the political sphere he was mayor of Larino from 1956 to 1960 and senator of the Republic first in the ranks of the mixed group and then of the Democrats of the Left from 1992 to 2001. He was the older brother of the famous sports journalist Aldo Biscardi.

He died on the morning of June 2, 2019 at the age of 90.
