= Michele Pinto =

Italian politician (1931–2026)

Michele Pinto OMRI
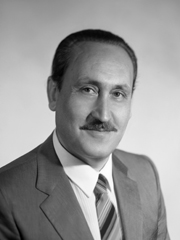

Minister of Agriculture
- In office 18 May 1996 – 21 October 1998
- Prime Minister: Romano Prodi
- Preceded by: Walter Luchetti
- Succeeded by: Paolo De Castro

Member of the Senate
- In office 12 July 1983 – 29 May 2001
- Constituency: Campania

Personal details
- Born: 2 January 1931 Teggiano, Kingdom of Italy
- Died: 19 August 2026 (aged 95) Sangineto, Italy
- Party: DC (till 1994); PPI (1994–2002)
- Profession: Lawyer

Michele Pinto (2 January 1931 – 19 August 2026) was an Italian politician.

== Life and career ==
Pinto served as Minister of agriculture in the Prodi I Cabinet and was the promoter of the Pinto law on fair reparation for the damage, patrimonial or non-patrimonial, suffered for the unreasonable duration of a trial (Law No. 89 of 24 March 2001). On 4 February 1997, the Chamber of Deputies rejected with 250 votes in favor and 311 votes against a motion of no confidence filed by the Northern League and National Alliance against him on the charge of not having been able to protect Italian breeders before the European Union on the issue of milk quotas.

He was made Knight Grand Cross of the Order of Merit of the Italian Republic by the President in Rome on 21 December 2005.

Pinto died on 19 August 2026, at the age of 95.
