= Ettore Bucciero =

Italian politician (1938–2025)

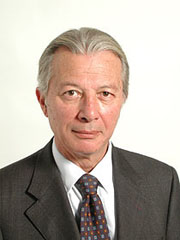
- Bucciero in 2001

Member of the Senate of the Republic of Italy
- In office 15 April 1994 – 27 April 2006

Personal details
- Born: 19 February 1938 Bari, Italy
- Died: 15 December 2025 (aged 87) Bari, Italy
- Party: AN
- Education: University of Bari
- Occupation: Lawyer

Ettore Bucciero (19 February 1938 – 15 December 2025) was an Italian politician. A member of the National Alliance, he served in the Senate of the Republic from 1994 to 2006.

Bucciero died in Bari on 15 December 2025, at the age of 87.
