= Fausto Marchetti =

Italian politician (1937–2017)

Fausto Marchetti (4 January 1937 – 30 March 2017) was an Italian lawyer and politician.

Marchetti was born on 4 January 1937 in Carrara, joined the Italian Socialist Party at the age of 16, and was elected to the municipal council in 1964. Upon the founding of the Italian Socialist Party of Proletarian Unity (PSIUP), Marchetti changed his party affiliation for the first time, and contested a seat on the Chamber of Deputies during the 1968 election. In 1971, Marchetti joined the majority of PSIUP members in the Italian Communist Party (PCI). Between 1975 and 1985, Marchetti was the only PCI-affiliated member of the Regional Council of Tuscany representing Carrara. He subsequently returned to the municipal council, and was elected mayor of Carrara in 1987 and 1989. Marchetti resigned the mayoralty in 1991, and became a founding member of the Communist Refoundation Party (PRC). While a member of the PRC, Marchetti won election to the Senate in 1992, 1994, and 1996. He stepped down at the end of his third term in 2001, and died on 30 March 2017.

In 2010, Marchetti was awarded the Golden Wheel of Carrara. Marchetti's son Nicola published a biography of his father in 2018, and is also a politician.
