= Anna Maria Bucciarelli =

Italian politician (born 1949)

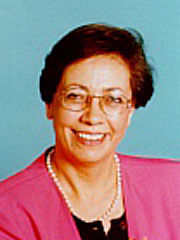

Member of the Senate
- In office 16 April 1992 – 29 May 2001

Personal details
- Born: 18 April 1949 (age 76); Impruneta, Italy
- Political party: Democratic Party of the Left; Alliance of Progressives; The Olive Tree

Anna Maria Bucciarelli (born 18 April 1949) is an Italian politician. She was a senator in the Senate of the Republic for the Democratic Party of the Left, the Alliance of Progressives and The Olive Tree.

== Early life ==
Bucciarelli was born on 18 April 1949 in Impruneta. She works as the superintendent of the Fiesole School of Music. She was elected as a regional councilor in Tuscany for the Italian Communist Party (PCI) in 1985. Following the dissolution of the party at the svolta della Bolognina, she joined the Democratic Party of the Left (PDS).

== Political career ==
She was first elected to the Senate of the Republic in the 1992 general election. She was a member of the 7th standing committee on public education and cultural heritage and the parliamentary committee on regional issues. She managed to retain her seat in the Palazzo Madama after the 1994 general election as a candidate for the Alliance of Progressives, for the fifth constituency in Prato. She served as the secretary for the Progressives from 27 May 1994 to 8 May 1996. She also kept her position on the 7th standing committee on public education and cultural heritage. She was re-elected for a final time in the 1996 general election as a candidate for The Olive Tree. She was the vice president of the party from 19 June 1996 to 22 September 1999. She was a member of the 7th standing committee on public education and cultural heritage, as well as serving as a member of the 1st standing committee for constitutional affairs and the parliamentary advisory committee on the implementation of administrative reform under Law No. 59 of 15 March 1997. She was the secretary for the President of the Senate from 9 February 2000 to 29 May 2001.
