= Francesco Pontone =

Italian politician (1927–2019)

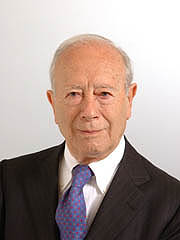
Francesco Pontone in 2008

Francesco Pontone (30 March 1927 – 2 July 2019) was an Italian politician.

He has been a Senator from 1987 to 2013 and served as Undersecretary for of Industry, Commerce and Craftsmanship in the Berlusconi I government.

Pontone was a member of the Italian Social Movement, of National Alliance (of which he was treasurer) and of The People of Freedom. In 2010 he joined the new Future and Freedom party of Gianfranco Fini, but in 2011 he returned to the PdL.

He died in 2019 at the age of 92.
