= Maria Grazia Pagano =

Italian teacher and politician (1945–2022)

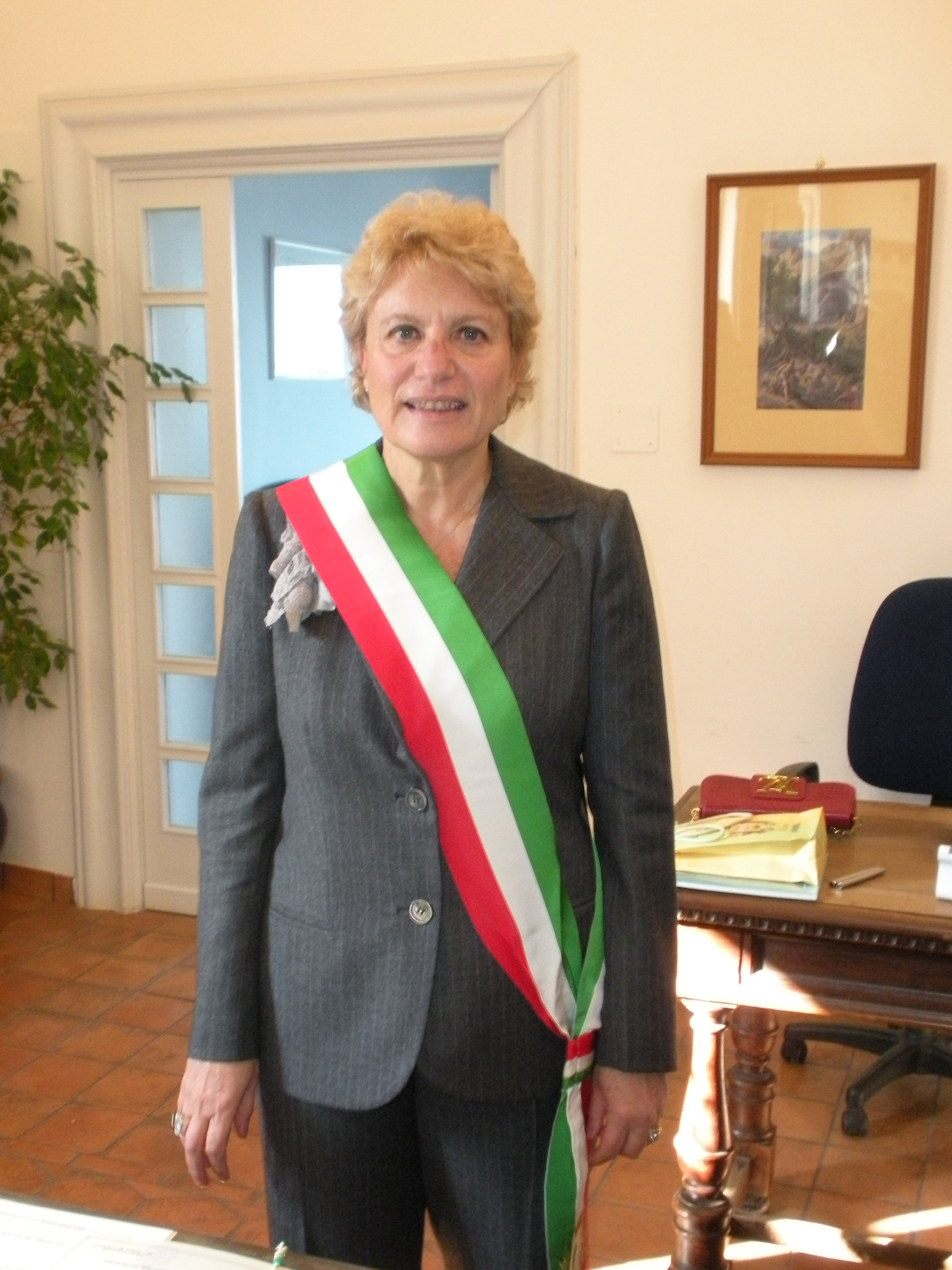
- Pagano in 2011

Member of the European Parliament
- In office 17 June 2008 – 13 July 2009
- Constituency: Southern Italy

Member of the Senate
- In office 23 April 1992 – 27 April 2006
- Constituency: Campania

Personal details
- Born: 5 November 1945 Naples, Italy
- Died: 17 September 2022 (aged 76) Rome, Italy
- Party: PCI (till 1991); PDS (1991-1998); DS (1998-2007); PD (2007-2019); IV (2019-2022)
- Other political affiliations: Group of the Party of European Socialists
- Education: University of Naples Federico II
- Occupation: Teacher

Maria Grazia Pagano (5 November 1945 – 17 September 2022) was an Italian teacher and politician. A member of the Democratic Party of the Left and later the Democrats of the Left, she served in the Senate of the Republic from 1992 to 2006 and in the European Parliament from 2008 to 2009.

Pagano died in Rome on 17 September 2022, at the age of 76.
