= Michele Lauria =

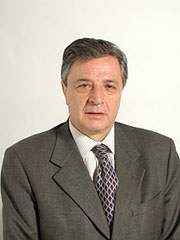

Mayor of Enna
- In office 1979–1987
- Preceded by: Aldo Alerci
- Succeeded by: Vito Cardaci

Member of the Senate of the Republic
- In office 2 July 1987 – 16 May 2005

Personal details
- Born: 9 November 1942 (age 83) Enna, Sicily, Italy
- Party: Christian Democracy; Italian People's Party; The Daisy; Democratic Party

Michele Lauria (born 9 November 1942) is an Italian politician and writer. He served as mayor of Enna from 1979 to 1987 and as a member of the Italian Senate from 1987 to 2005. During the centre-left governments of the late 1990s and early 2000s, he served as Undersecretary for Posts, Telecommunications and Communications. He was later a commissioner of the Italian Communications Authority (AGCOM).
