= Maria Rosaria Manieri =

Italian academic and politician (born 1943)

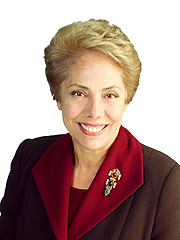

Member of the Italian Senate
- In office 1987–2006

Personal details
- Born: 30 May 1943 (age 83) Nardò, Fascist Italy
- Education: Italian Socialist Party; Italian Socialist Party (2007)
- Occupation: Academic

Maria Rosaria Manieri (born 30 May 1943) is an Italian academic and socialist politician. She served at the Italian Senate from 1987 to 2006.

== Early life and education ==
Manieri was born in Nardò on 30 May 1943. During her university studies she was the deputy secretary of the Catholic Action student movement.

== Career ==
Manieri was working as a faculty member when she joined politics becoming the municipal councilor and then councilor of the Municipality of Nardò. She was first elected to the Senate for the Italian Socialist Party in 1987. She served there for five consecutive legislatures until 2006. She joined the newly founded Italian Socialist Party in 2007.

Manieri is an associate professor of moral philosophy at the University of Lecce.

== Awards ==
Manieri is the recipient of the Mediterranean Woman award and the Salento award.
