= Giovanni Lorenzo Forcieri =

Italian politician (born 1949)

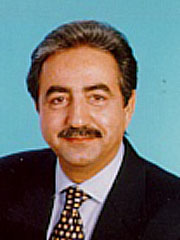

Member of the Senate
- In office 23 April 1992 – 27 April 2006

Personal details
- Born: 24 March 1949 (age 77) Santo Stefano di Magra, Italy
- Party: PDS, DS, PD
- Profession: Politician

Giovanni Lorenzo Forcieri (born 24 March 1949) is an Italian politician who was elected to the Italian Senate in the 1992, 1994, 1996 and 2001 general election representing left-wing parties.

He is the president of the Distretto Ligure delle Tecnologie Marine He was also the president of the autorità portuale of La Spezia.
