= Donato Manfroi =

Italian politician (1940–2022)

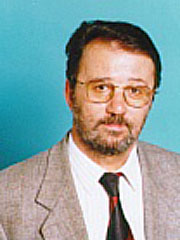

Member of the Senate of the Republic of Italy
- In office 23 April 1992 – 29 May 2001
- Constituency: Belluno 7

Personal details
- Born: 27 October 1940 Cencenighe Agordino, Italy
- Died: 27 October 2022 (aged 82) Cencenighe Agordino, Italy
- Party: LN; LVR; DE

Donato Manfroi (27 October 1940 – 27 October 2022) was an Italian politician. A member of the Lega Nord, the Liga Veneta Repubblica, and European Democracy, he served in the Senate of the Republic from 1992 to 2001.

Manfroi died in his home town Cencenighe Agordino on 27 October 2022, his 82nd birthday.

== Personal life ==
Manfroi was born on 27 October 1940 in Cencenighe Agordino, a municipality in the Province of Belluno. Prior to his full-time political career, he worked as a functionary for Italy's National Institute of Social Security.

Along with his wife, Manfroi operated a traditional family restaurant in his home town.
