= Carbonia, Sardinia =

Carbonia: Crabònia (Campidanese); Carbònia (Sardinian)
- Comune
- Comune di Carbonia
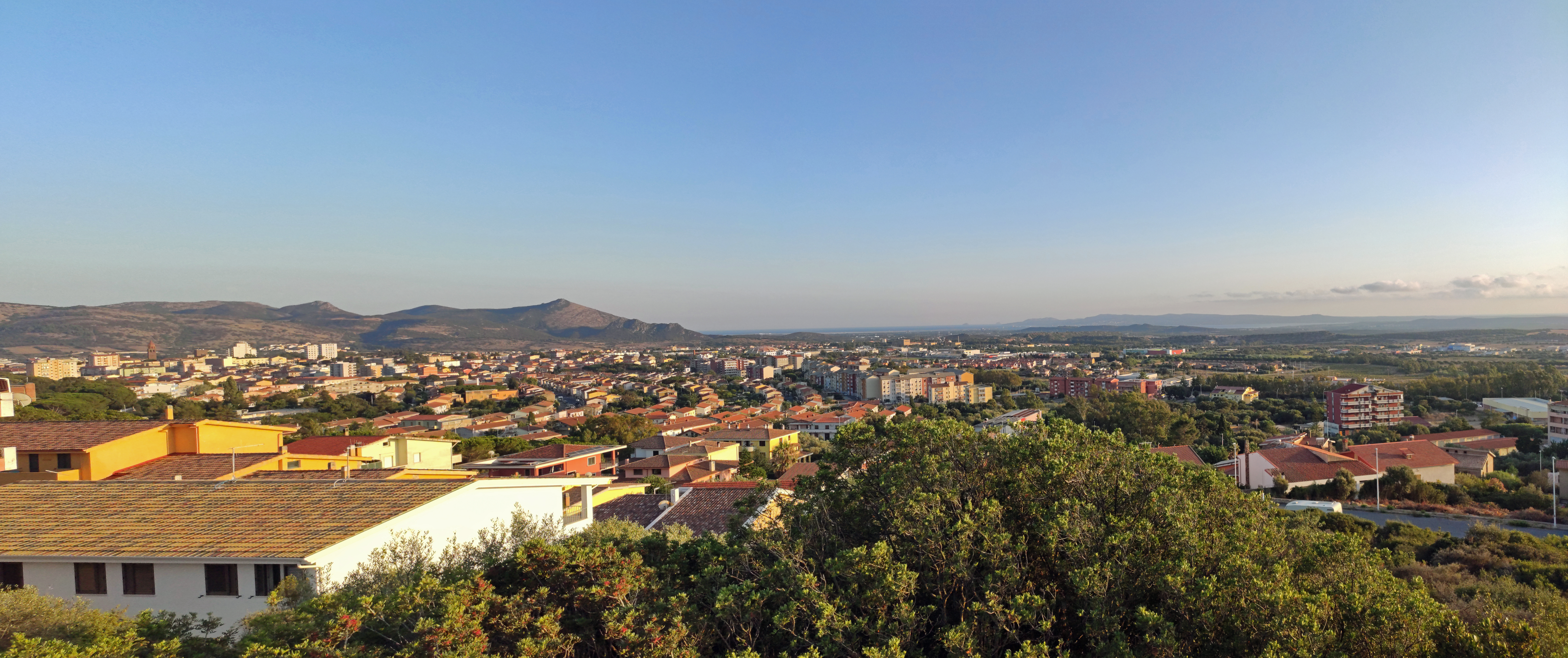
- Panorama of Carbonia

- Flag Coat of arms

- Location within Sardinia
- Coordinates: 39°10′2″N 8°31′20″E
- Country: Italy
- Region: Sardinia
- Province: Sulcis Iglesiente
- Frazioni: Bacu Abis, Barbusi, Cannas, Corongiu, Cortoghiana, Genna Corriga, Flumentepido, Is Gannaus, Is Meis, Medadeddu, Medau Desogus, Serbariu, Sirai, Sirri

Government
  - Mayor: Pietro Morittu (PD)

Area
  - Total: 145.54 km^{2} (56.19 sq mi)
- Elevation: 111 m (364 ft)

Population (2026)
  - Total: 25,353
  - Density: 174.20/km^{2} (451.17/sq mi)
- Demonym: Carboniesi or Carboniensi
- Time zone: UTC+1 (CET)
  - Summer (DST): UTC+2 (CEST)
- Postal code: 09013
- Dialing code: 0781
- Patron saint: St. Pontian
- Saint day: Third Thursday of May
- Website: Official website

Carbonia (Italian: [karˈbɔːnja]; Sardinian: Carbònia; Campidanese: Crabònia [kɾaˈβɔɲa]) is a town and comune (municipality), along with Iglesias is the co-capital of the province of Sulcis Iglesiente in the autonomous island region of Sardinia in Italy. It is located in the south-west of the island, at about an hour by car or train from the regional capital, Cagliari. With a population of 25,353, it is the largest municipality in the province and the 10th-largest in Sardinia.

== History ==
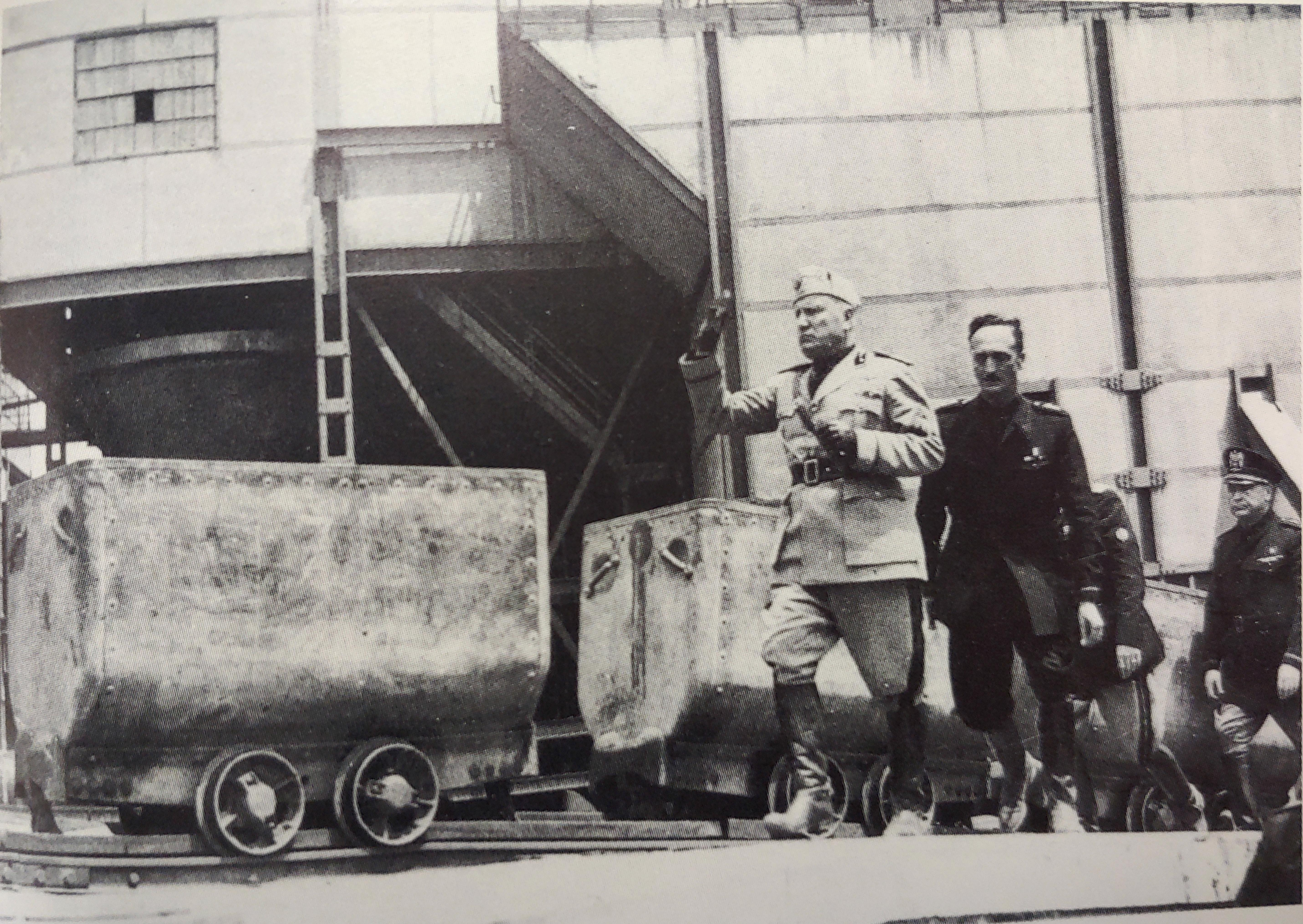
Benito Mussolini visit Carbonia in 1938

Carbonia was founded on the 18 December 1938 by the Fascist regime. Benito Mussolini ordered the building of the city and was present at its inauguration. The city was built to provide housing for the workforce of the nearby mines. The name Carbonia comes from the Italian word for coal, abundant in the area.

Vitale Piga was appointed mayor of Carbonia and served in that capacity from September 28, 1939 to April 24, 1942. Piga authored a book on the coalfields of the Sulcis region titled Il giacimento carbonifero del Sulcis: Carbonia.

The city has grown since its founding in 1938 due to immigration from elsewhere on the island and from mainland Italy (in particular from the regions of Veneto, Sicily, Abruzzo, Marche, Basilicata and Campania), reaching about 45,000 residents in 1951. Currently it has a population of over 28,000.

Since the closing of the mines in the 1970s, Carbonia has had a high unemployment rate. After the closure of the mines the town's economy was converted to the metallurgical industry. Today most Carbonians are employed in heavy industry, and in the tertiary sector.

== Climate ==
According to the Köppen climate classification, Carbonia experiences a hot-summer Mediterranean climate (Csa).

Climate data for Carbonia (Bacu Abis) (1981–2010)
Month	Jan	Feb	Mar	Apr	May	Jun	Jul	Aug	Sep	Oct	Nov	Dec	Year
Mean daily maximum °C (°F)	13.9 (57.0)	14.1 (57.4)	17.0 (62.6)	19.0 (66.2)	23.8 (74.8)	27.9 (82.2)	30.7 (87.3)	31.1 (88.0)	27.5 (81.5)	23.7 (74.7)	18.5 (65.3)	14.6 (58.3)	21.8 (71.3)
Daily mean °C (°F)	10.5 (50.9)	10.4 (50.7)	13.0 (55.4)	14.7 (58.5)	18.9 (66.0)	22.6 (72.7)	25.4 (77.7)	25.9 (78.6)	22.6 (72.7)	19.3 (66.7)	14.9 (58.8)	11.3 (52.3)	17.5 (63.4)
Mean daily minimum °C (°F)	7.0 (44.6)	6.7 (44.1)	8.9 (48.0)	10.3 (50.5)	13.9 (57.0)	17.3 (63.1)	20.1 (68.2)	20.6 (69.1)	17.6 (63.7)	14.8 (58.6)	11.2 (52.2)	7.9 (46.2)	13.0 (55.4)
Average precipitation mm (inches)	56.0 (2.20)	58.3 (2.30)	40.9 (1.61)	56.0 (2.20)	31.8 (1.25)	16.7 (0.66)	1.1 (0.04)	7.2 (0.28)	37.0 (1.46)	68.2 (2.69)	92.6 (3.65)	82.2 (3.24)	548 (21.58)
Source: Sistema nazionale protezione ambiente

== Demographics ==
As of 2026, the population is 25,353, of which 48.0% are male, and 52.0% are female. Minors make up 10.1% of the population, and seniors make up 34.5%.

Historical population

Year	Pop.	±%
1861	1,798	—
1871	2,015	+12.1%
1881	2,379	+18.1%
1901	3,109	+30.7%
1911	2,925	−5.9%
1921	3,628	+24.0%
1931	4,201	+15.8%
1936	4,415	+5.1%

Year	Pop.	±%
1951	45,125	+922.1%
1961	35,327	−21.7%
1971	30,957	−12.4%
1981	32,180	+4.0%
1991	32,887	+2.2%
2001	30,447	−7.4%
2011	28,882	−5.1%
2021	26,565	−8.0%

Source: ISTAT

=== Immigration ===
Foreign population by country of birth (2025)
Country	Population
Germany	135
Romania	113
France	96
China	42
Brazil	41
Senegal	38
Morocco	34
Switzerland	33
Belgium	20
Argentina	16
Bangladesh	16
Russia	16
Nigeria	15
Algeria	14
Kyrgyzstan	14

As of 2025, immigrants make up 3.3% of the total population. The 5 largest foreign countries of birth are Germany, Romania, France, China, and Brazil.

== Main sights ==
- Monte Sirai, a hill in the surroundings of the city that hosts the ruins of a Phoenician-Carthaginian built-up area
- Domus de janas in the surroundings of Sirri and Monte Crobu
- Romanesque church of Santa Maria di Flumentepido (11th century)
- Former Serbariu Coal Mine, now turned into a museum and a site of industrial archaeology

== Twin towns - sister cities ==
Carbonia is twinned with:

- Oberhausen, Germany
- Behren-lès-Forbach, France, since 2005
- Labin, Croatia, since 2010
- Raša, Croatia, since 2010

== Gallery ==
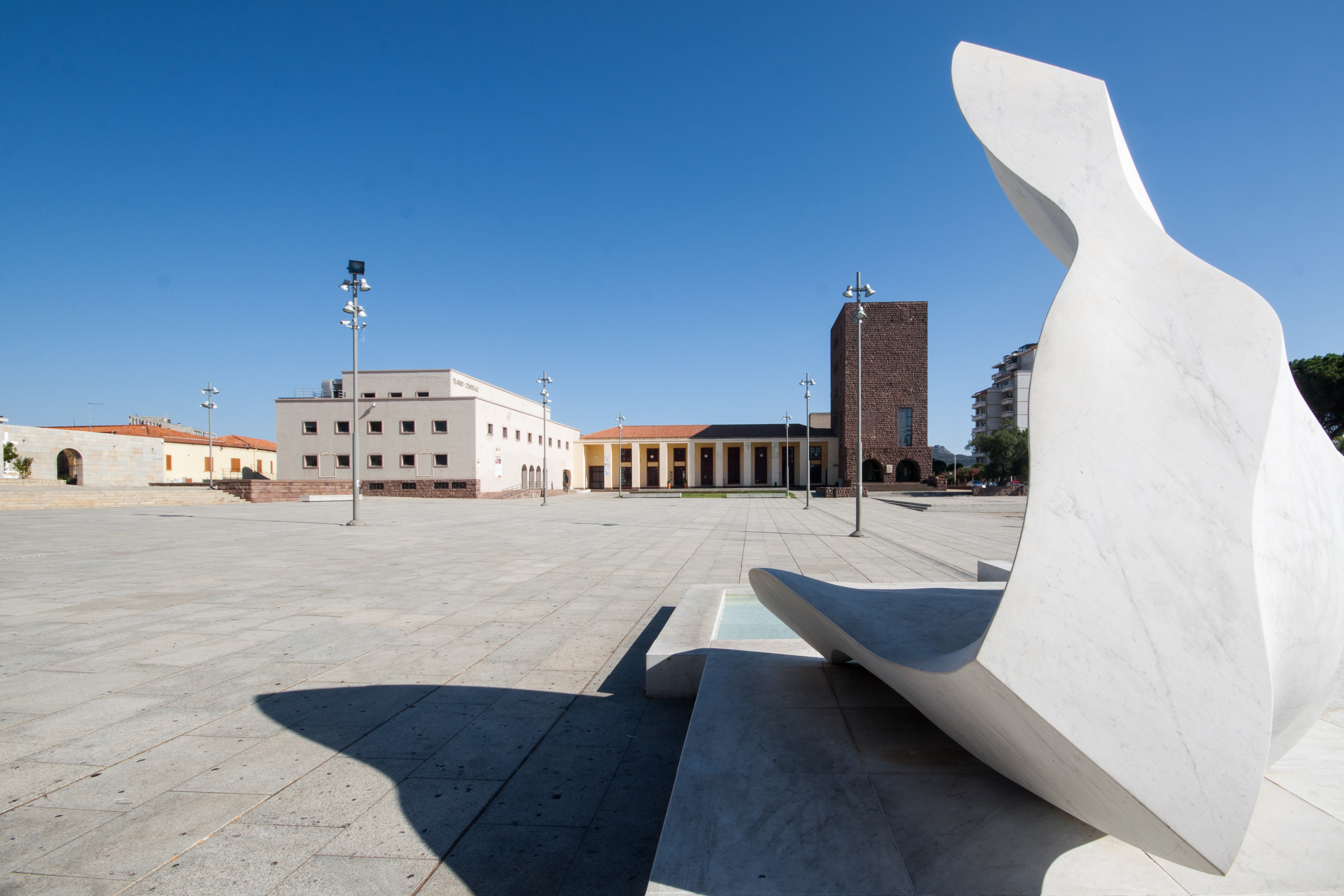
Piazza Roma

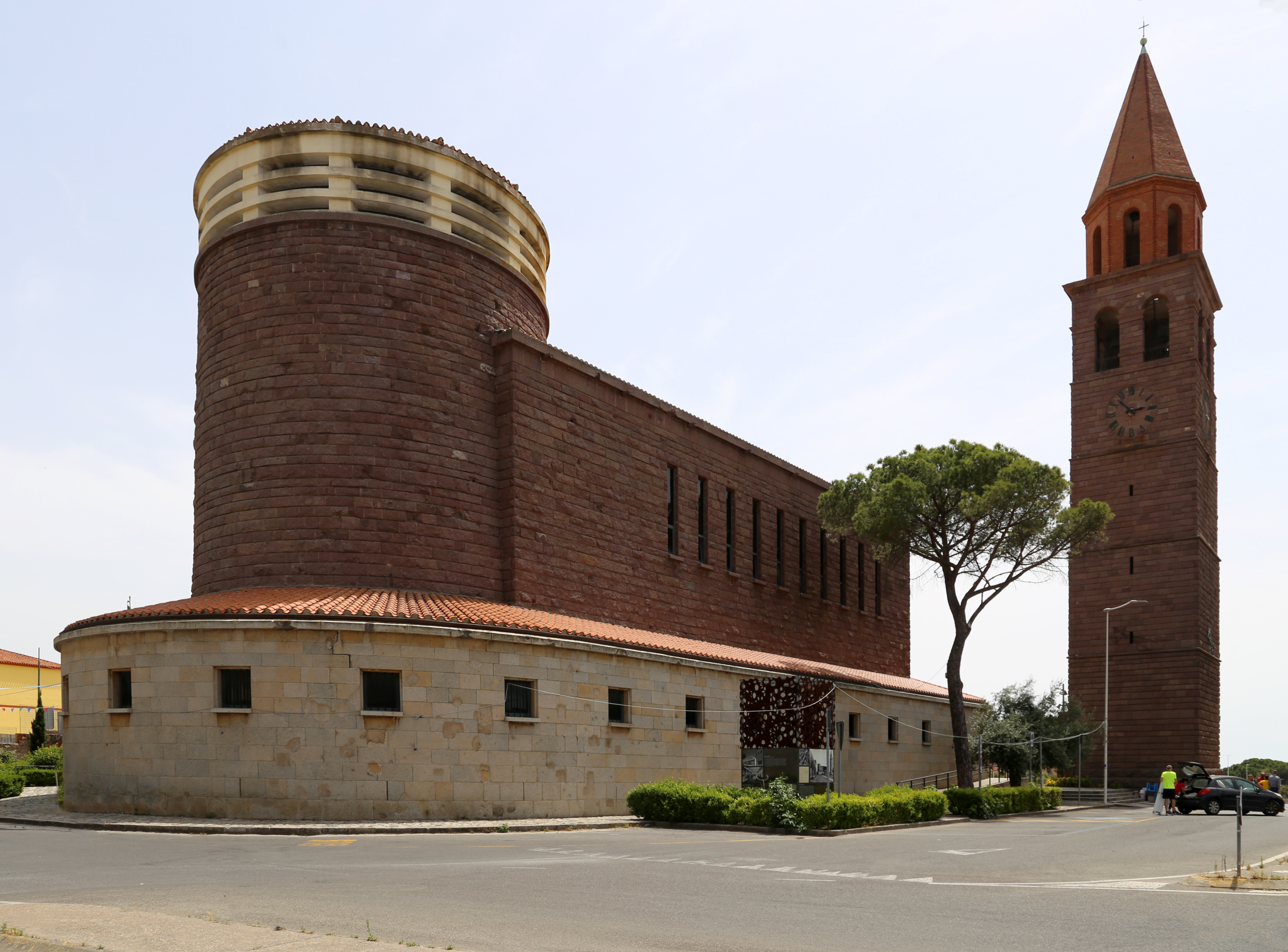
Church of St. Pontian

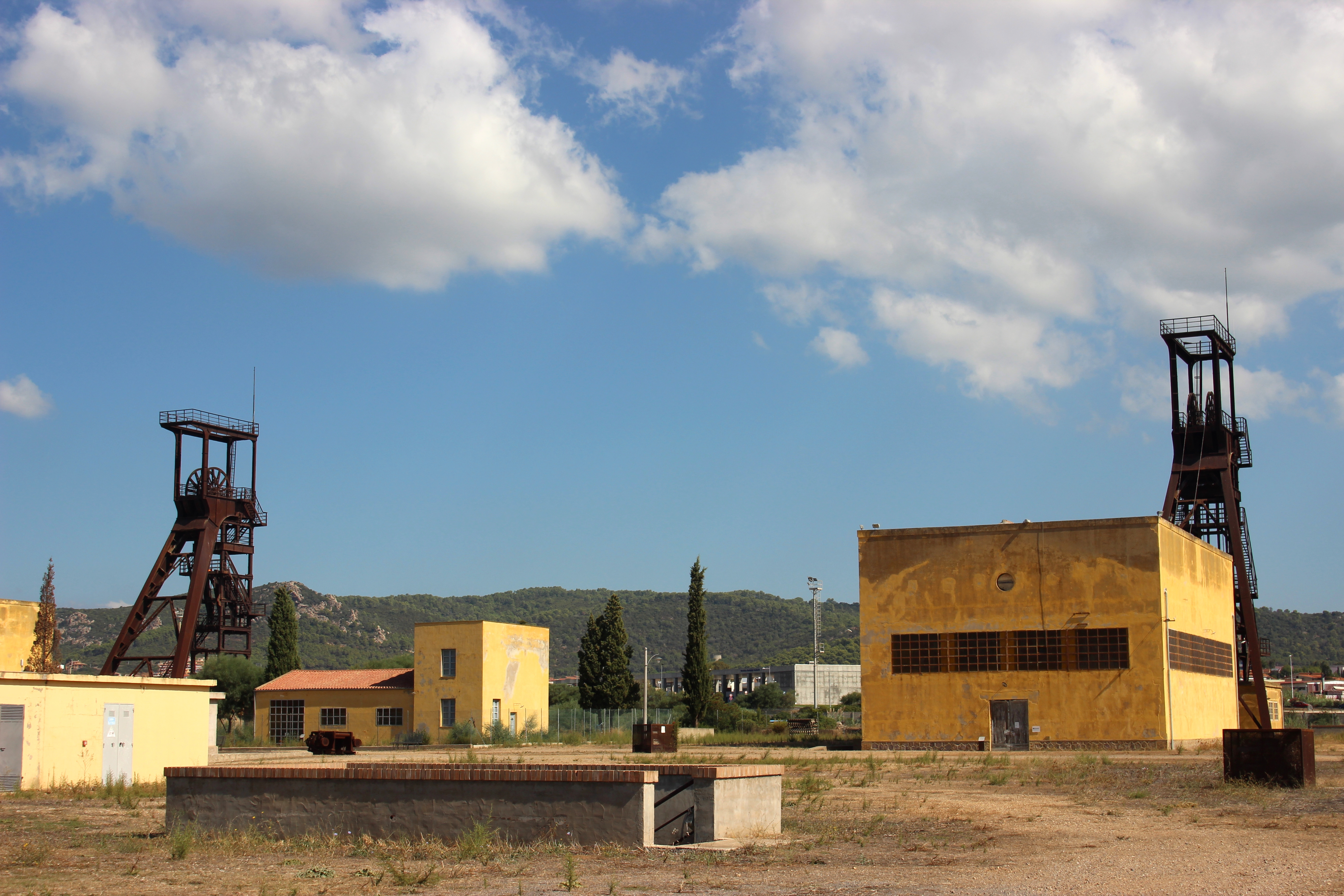
Serbariu mine
