= 1994 Italian Senate election in Lombardy =

- March 27, 1994

All 47 Lombard seats in the Italian Senate
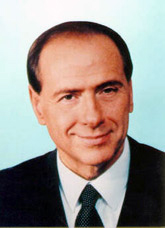

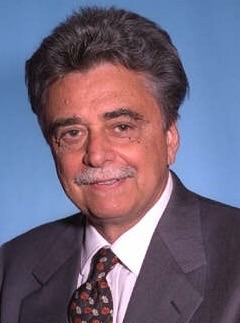
	Majority party	Minority party
Leader	Silvio Berlusconi	Achille Occhetto
Party	Forza Italia	PDS
Alliance	Pole of Freedoms	Progressives
Last election	14 seats, 26.5% sum of supporters	19 seats, 36.0% sum of the parties
Seats won	35	6
Seat change	▲22	▼12
Popular vote	2,491,623	1,291,179
Percentage	43.6%	22.6%
Swing	▲17.1%	▼13.4%
Plurality before election
DC
New local majority
Pole of Freedoms

Lombardy renewed its delegation to the Italian Senate on March 27, 1994. This election was a part of national Italian general election of 1994 even if, according to the Italian Constitution, every senatorial challenge in each Region is a single and independent race.

The election was won by the new Silvio Berlusconi's centre-right coalition called Pole of Freedoms, which obtained a local landslide victory electing all its candidates.

== Background ==
This election was the first one of the so-called Second Republic. If Italy had the strongest political stability in the previous 50 years, in twelve months it probably suffered the deepest democratic change ever in Western Europe. All the parties that ruled the country in the second half of the 20th century collapsed, under the political attack of the Northern League and the judiciary scandal of Mani pulite. After the electoral reform from the proportional representation to a prevalent FPTP system, the political spectrum was reorganized in three poles: the leftist Alliance of Progressives, the centrist Pact for Italy and the centre-rightist Pole of Freedoms. This latter was an alliance between the League and new liberal party Forza Italia of television entrepreneur and A.C. Milan President Silvio Berlusconi.

Berlusconi attacked the Progressives calling them a "communist" alliance, effectively subtracting quite all the former Socialist votes even if the Italian Socialist Party (PSI) was a member of that alliance: the PSI was consequently disbanded after 100 years of history, and the Alliance had little more than the traditional support of the former Italian Communist Party, then Democratic Party of the Left. Obtaining also more moderate votes than Christian Democracy's heir, the Italian People's Party (Pact), Berlusconi ensured the victory of his coalition, that in Lombardy resulted very profitable to the League, which obtained the absolute majority of the senators.

== Electoral system ==
The intricate electoral system introduced in 1993, called Mattarella Law, provided 75% of the seats in the Senate as elected by first-past-the-post system, whereas the remaining 25% was assigned by a special proportional method that actually assigned the remaining seats to minority parties.

=== Redistricting ===
The new electoral law imposed the revision of the outdated design of the constituencies of 1948. After quite a half century, the agricultural south had lost population to the industrial Milan metropolitan area. The Province of Cremona and the Province of Pavia lost a seat, while new constituencies were added in the western and northern Milanese hinterland. The number of constituencies rose from 31 to 35.

== Results ==
Coalition	votes	votes (%)	seats	Party	seats	change
Pole of Freedoms	2,491,623	43.6	35	Northern League	26	▲15
Pole of Freedoms	2,491,623	43.6	35	Forza Italia	8	▲7
Pole of Freedoms	2,491,623	43.6	35	Christian Democratic Centre	1	=
The Progressives	1,291,179	22.6	6	Democratic Party of the Left	3	▼4
The Progressives	1,291,179	22.6	6	Communist Refoundation Party	2	▼1
The Progressives	1,291,179	22.6	6	Democratic Alliance	1	=
Pact for Italy	837,082	14.7	3	Italy People's Party	3	▼10
National Alliance	380,051	6.6	1	National Alliance	1	=
Lombard Alpine League	246,046	4.3	1	Lombard Alpine League	1	=
Pannella List	217,955	3.8	1	Forza Italia	1	▲1
Others & PSI & PRI	245,872	4.3	-	Others	-	▼9
Total coalitions	5,709,808	100.0	47	Total parties	47	▼1

Sources: Ministry of the Interior, Italian Senate

=== Constituencies ===
N°	Constituency	Winner	Alliance	Party	Votes %	Others
1	Milan Central	Marisa Bedoni	Pole of Freedoms	Northern League	43.8%	R. De Corato (AN) 10.5% F. Scopelliti (Pann.) 5.1%
2	Milan East	Giancarlo Pagliarini	Pole of Freedoms	Northern League	45.5%	
3	Milan West	Carlo Scognamiglio	Pole of Freedoms	Forza Italia	47.3%	
4	Milan South	Roberto Lasagna	Pole of Freedoms	Forza Italia	43.2%	
5	Milan North	Maurilio Frigerio	Pole of Freedoms	Northern League	41.2%	P. Giurickovic (Progr.) 30.9%
6	Milan Sesto SG	Celestino Pedrazzini	Pole of Freedoms	Northern League	42.7%	A. Crippa (Progr.) 31.6%
7	Lodi	Michele Bucci	Pole of Freedoms	Forza Italia	40.4%	
8	Rozzano	Gianluigi Lombardi	Pole of Freedoms	Northern League	40.8%	C. Smuraglia (Progr.) 31.6%
9	Abbiategrasso	Ivaldo Carini	Pole of Freedoms	Northern League	45.4%	
10	Rho	Gianluigi Carnovali	Pole of Freedoms	Northern League	44.7%	
11	Bollate	Erminio Busnelli	Pole of Freedoms	Northern League	44.0%	
12	Cinisello Balsamo	Domenico Contestabile	Pole of Freedoms	Forza Italia	39.8%	C. Stajano (Progr.) 32.3%
13	Seregno	Roberto Radice	Pole of Freedoms	Forza Italia	48.2%	
14	Monza	Giorgio Brambilla	Pole of Freedoms	Northern League	43.5%	
15	Melzo	Marcello Staglieno	Pole of Freedoms	Northern League	39.8%	
16	Cologno Monzese	Corinto Marchini	Pole of Freedoms	Northern League	42.4%	
17	Varese	Giovanni Binaghi	Pole of Freedoms	Northern League	50.7%	
18	Gallarate	Luigi Peruzzotti	Pole of Freedoms	Northern League	51.6%	
19	Busto Arsizio	Francesco Speroni	Pole of Freedoms	Northern League	53.0%	
20	Como	Gianfranco Miglio	Pole of Freedoms	Northern League	47.9%	
21	Cantù	Elia Manara	Pole of Freedoms	Northern League	47.1%	
22	Brescia	Francesco Tabladini	Pole of Freedoms	Northern League	37.1%	
23	Lumezzane	Luciano Garatti	Pole of Freedoms	Forza Italia	41.6%	A. Gregorelli (Pact) 20.1%
24	Desenzano del Garda	Massimo Wilde	Pole of Freedoms	Northern League	40.4%	
25	Chiari	Giovanni Gei	Pole of Freedoms	Christian Democratic Centre	41.8%	F. Ferrari (Pact) 22.7%
26	Suzzara	Giovanni Robusti	Pole of Freedoms	Northern League	34.5%	P. Bergonzi (Progr.) 31.7%
27	Mantua	Paolo Gibertoni	Pole of Freedoms	Northern League	35.3%	R. Borroni (Progr.) 33.2%
28	Cremona	Italico Maffini	Pole of Freedoms	Northern League	38.8%	
29	Pavia	Giampiero Beccaria	Pole of Freedoms	Forza Italia	42.0%	
30	Vigevano	Mario Masiero	Pole of Freedoms	Northern League	45.3%	
31	Bergamo	Livio Caputo	Pole of Freedoms	Forza Italia	42.3%	
32	Albino	Silvestro Terzi	Pole of Freedoms	Northern League	48.1%	V. Bonandrini (Pact) 21.1% E. De Paoli (LAL) 7.5%
33	Treviglio	Massimo Dolazza	Pole of Freedoms	Northern League	43.6%	
34	Sondrio	Giampaolo Paini	Pole of Freedoms	Northern League	48.6%	
35	Lecco	Luigi Roveda	Pole of Freedoms	Northern League	43.2%	C. Secchi (Pact) 19.8%

=== Additional senators ===
- The Progressives
1. Roberto Borroni (Democratic Party of the Left, 33.2%)
2. Corrado Stajano (Democratic Party of the Left, 32.3%)
3. Piergiorgio Bergonzi (Communist Refoundation Party, 31.7%)
4. Carlo Smuraglia (Democratic Party of the Left, 31.6%)
5. Aurelio Crippa (Communist Refoundation Party, 31.6%)
6. Pietro Giurickovic (Democratic Alliance, 30.9%)
- Pact for Italy
1. Francesco Ferrari (Italian People's Party, 22.7%)
2. Vincenzo Bonandrini (Italian People's Party, 21.1%), after his death in 1994 substituted by Carlo Secchi (Italian People's Party, 19.8%)
3. Aldo Gregorelli (Italian People's Party, 20.1%)
- National Alliance
1. Riccardo De Corato (National Alliance, 10.5%)
- Lombard Alpine League
1. Elidio De Paoli (Lombard Alpine League, 7.5%)
- Pannella List
1. Francesca Scopelliti (Pannella List–Forza Italia, 5.1%)
