= 2001 Italian Senate election in Lombardy =

- May 13, 2001

All 47 Lombard seats in the Italian Senate
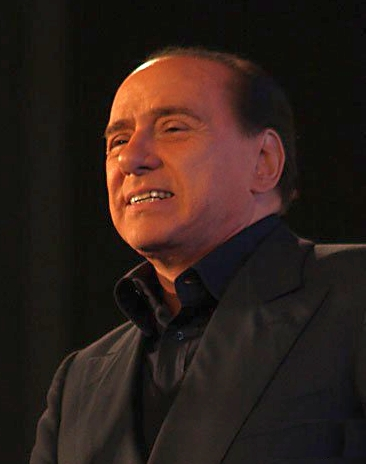

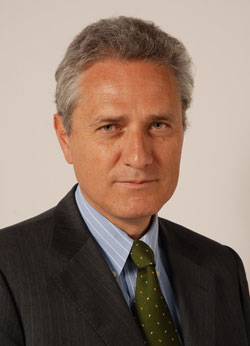
	Majority party	Minority party
Leader	Silvio Berlusconi	Francesco Rutelli
Party	Forza Italia	The Daisy
Alliance	House of Freedoms	The Olive Tree
Last election	27 seats, 57.2% as PPL and LN	19 seats, 34.2%
Seats won	33	11
Seat change	+6	-7
Popular vote	2,557,622	1,924,113
Percentage	44.8%	33.7%
Swing	-12.4%	-0.5%
Majority before election
House of Freedoms
New Majority
House of Freedoms

Lombardy renewed its delegation to the Italian Senate on May 13, 2001. This election was a part of national Italian general election of 2001 even if, according to the Italian Constitution, every senatorial challenge in each Region is a single and independent race.

The election was won by the centre-right coalition called House of Freedoms, as it happened at the national level. The House was a new alliance formed for Lombard regional election of 2000 between political giants Pole of Freedoms and Lega Nord. All provinces gave a majority or a plurality to the new Prime Minister of Italy.

== Background ==
Silvio Berlusconi was the largely predicted winner of this election. He had a complete victory during the 1999 European election and, more, he strengthened his position with the alliance between his Pole of Freedoms and his former rivals of Umberto Bossi's Lega Nord, forming the House of Freedoms for the 2000 regional election which gave him a landslide victory. In this context, the majoritarian system was ensuring him a literal triumph in Lombardy.

On the other side, The Olive Tree was coming from five years of troubled government, with three different Prime Ministers, and divisions between member parties obliged to give a nomination to a fourth man, Francesco Rutelli.

== Electoral system ==
The intricate electoral system introduced in 1993, called Mattarella Law, provided 75% of the seats in the Senate as elected by first-past-the-post system, whereas the remaining 25% was assigned by a special proportional method that assigned more of the remaining seats to minority parties.

Formally this was an example of mixed-member majoritarian system.

== Results ==
Coalition	votes	votes (%)	seats	Party	seats	change
House of Freedoms	2,557,622	44.8	33	Forza Italia	15	+5
House of Freedoms	2,557,622	44.8	33	Lega Nord	9	-2
House of Freedoms	2,557,622	44.8	33	National Alliance	7	+2
House of Freedoms	2,557,622	44.8	33	Union of Christian and Centre Democrats	1	+1
House of Freedoms	2,557,622	44.8	33	Italian Republican Party	1	=
The Olive Tree	1,924,113	33.7	11	Democrats of the Left	4	-8
The Olive Tree	1,924,113	33.7	11	Democracy is Freedom	4	-1
The Olive Tree	1,924,113	33.7	11	Federation of the Greens	2	=
The Olive Tree	1,924,113	33.7	11	Party of Italian Communists	1	+1
Lega per l'Autonomia – Alleanza Lombarda	308,559	5.4	1	Lega per l'Autonomia – Alleanza Lombarda	1	+1
Communist Refoundation Party	279,152	4.9	1	Communist Refoundation Party	1	=
Italy of Values	180,828	3.2	1	Italy of Values	1	+1
Others	459,023	8.0	-	Others	-	-
Total coalitions	5,709,297	100.0	47	Total parties	47	=

Sources: Italian Senate

=== Constituencies ===
N°	Constituency	Winner	Alliance	Party	Votes %	Losers
1	Milan Central	Marcello Dell'Utri		Forza Italia	46.1%	A. Onofrio (Ulivo) 30.1%
2	Milan East	Gianpiero Cantoni		Forza Italia	49.2%	G. Malagoli (Ulivo) 33.9%
3	Milan West	Riccardo De Corato		National Alliance	51.2%	Felice Besostri (Ulivo) 33.2%
4	Milan South	Raffaele Iannuzzi		Forza Italia	46.3%	A. Duva (Ulivo) 34.0%
5	Milan North	Sergio Travaglia		Forza Italia	44.0%	Gianfranco Pagliarulo (Ulivo) 35.9% Luigi Malabarba (PRC) 6.8%
6	Sesto San Giovanni	Antonio Del Pennino		Italian Republican Party	42.9%	Antonio Pizzinato (Ulivo) 38.7%
7	Lodi	Romano Comincioli		Forza Italia	43.5%	Gianni Piatti (Ulivo) 36.2%
8	Rozzano	Antonino Caruso		National Alliance	46.2%	Ornella Piloni (Ulivo) 36.0%
9	Abbiategrasso	Francesco Servello		National Alliance	46.4%	G. Mainini (Ulivo) 33.0%
10	Rho	Giuseppe Valditara		National Alliance	44.2%	Roberto Biscardini (Ulivo) 35.3%
11	Bollate	Cesarino Monti		Lega Nord	44.5%	A. Pollio (Ulivo) 35.3%
12	Cinisello Balsamo	Alberto Zorzoli		Forza Italia	41.5%	Patrizia Toia (Ulivo) 40.6%
13	Seregno	Enrico Rizzi		Forza Italia	49.4%	L. Mariani (Ulivo) 29.6%
14	Monza	Alfredo Mantica		National Alliance	46.1%	Emanuela Baio (Ulivo) 35.4%
15	Melzo	Luigi Scotti		Forza Italia	41.5%	Loris Maconi (Ulivo) 38.4%
16	Cologno Monzese	Enrico Pianetta		Forza Italia	44.8%	Natale Ripamonti (Ulivo) 36.4%
17	Varese	Piero Pellicini		National Alliance	45.8%	M. Marzaro (Ulivo) 31.1%
18	Gallarate	Luigi Peruzzotti		Lega Nord	46.9%	M. Ampollini (Ulivo) 30.4%
19	Busto Arsizio	Antonio Tomassini		Forza Italia	46.6%	G. Canziani (Ulivo) 29.7%
20	Como	Celestino Pedrazzini		Lega Nord	48.4%	A. Rinaldi (Ulivo) 29.5%
21	Cantù	Graziano Maffioli		Union of Christian and Centre Democrats	45.7%	G. Ballabio (Ulivo) 31.0%
22	Brescia	Paolo Guzzanti		Forza Italia	42.8%	Pierluigi Petrini (Ulivo) 37.0%
23	Lumezzane	Guglielmo Castagnetti		Forza Italia	41.8%	A. Bonomelli (Ulivo) 33.6%
24	Desenzano del Garda	Francesco Tirelli		Lega Nord	44.8%	A. Zanelli (Ulivo) 32.5%
25	Chiari	Sergio Agoni		Lega Nord	45.7%	D. Buizza (Ulivo) 30.6%
26	Suzzara	Franco Danieli		Democracy is Freedom	38.6%	M. Pini (CdL) 37.5%
27	Mantua	Anna Donati		Federation of the Greens	42.1%	F. Scopelliti (CdL) 38.3%
28	Cremona	Lamberto Grillotti		National Alliance	41.8%	A. Rescaglio (Ulivo) 35.0%
29	Pavia	Luigi Fabbri		Forza Italia	44.8%	T. Montagna (Ulivo) 34.9%
30	Vigevano	Domenico Contestabile		Forza Italia	47.4%	M. Donato (Ulivo) 32.2%
31	Bergamo	Vittorio Pessina		Forza Italia	40.8%	G. Zilio (Ulivo) 33.7%
32	Albino	Roberto Calderoli		Lega Nord	44.2%	D. Carminati (Ulivo) 28.8% Elidio De Paoli (LAL) 11.5% Valerio Carrara (Italy of Values) 4.7%
33	Treviglio	Ettore Pirovano		Lega Nord	43.6%	C. Bonfichi (Ulivo) 28.4%
34	Sondrio	Fiorello Provera		Lega Nord	52.1%	E. Dioli (Ulivo) 28.0%
35	Lecco	Roberto Castelli		Lega Nord	41.7%	I. Bruseghini (Ulivo) 35.2%

=== Additional senators ===
- The Olive Tree
1. Patrizia Toia (Democracy is Freedom, 40.6%)
2. Antonio Pizzinato (Democrats of the Left, 38.7%)
3. Loris Maconi (Democrats of the Left, 38.4%)
4. Pierluigi Petrini (Democracy is Freedom, 37.0%)
5. Natale Ripamonti (Federation of the Greens, 36.4%)
6. Gianni Piatti (Democrats of the Left, 36.2%)
7. Ornella Piloni (Democrats of the Left, 36.0%)
8. Gianfranco Pagliarulo (Party of Italian Communists, 35.9%)
9. Emanuela Baio (Democracy is Freedom, 35.4%)
- Autonomous Lombard Alliance
1. Elidio De Paoli (Lega per l'Autonomia – Alleanza Lombarda, 11.5%)
- Communist Refoundation Party
1. Luigi Malabarba (Communist Refoundation Party, 6.8%)
- Italy of Values
1. Valerio Carrara (Italy of Values, 4.7%)
