= 1992 Italian Senate election in Lombardy =

- April 5, 1992

All 48 Lombard seats to the Italian Senate
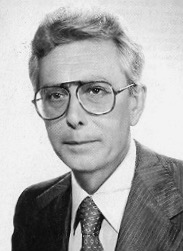

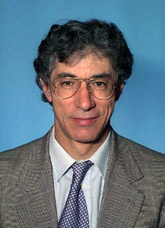

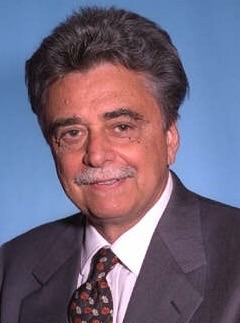
	Majority party	Minority party	Third party
Leader	Arnaldo Forlani	Umberto Bossi	Achille Occhetto
Party	DC	Lega Nord	PDS
Last election	34.4%, 18 seats	2.6%, 1 seat	20.5%, 10 seats as 5/6 of the PCI
Seats won	14	11	7
Seat change	▼4	▲10	▼3
Popular vote	1,414,109	1,150,022	726,737
Percentage	25.2%	20.5%	12.9%
Swing	▼9.2%	▲17.9%	▼7.6%
Old local plurality before election
DC
New local plurality
DC

Lombardy elected its eleventh delegation to the Italian Senate on April 5, 1992. This election was a part of national Italian general election of 1992 even if, according to the Italian Constitution, every senatorial challenge in each Region is a single and independent race.

The election was won by the centrist Christian Democracy, as it happened at national level. Seven Lombard provinces gave a majority or at least a plurality to the winning party, while the Swiss-bordering Province of Varese and Province of Como preferred the federalist Northern League.

== Background ==
After quite five decades of exceptional political stability, the election of 1992 marked a revolution. Umberto Bossi's Northern League, acting as a catch-all party, took votes from all other parties on a base of tax protest and a federalist project. Christian Democracy lost more than in the previous 30 years, the former Communists, now divided between the Democratic Party of the Left and the Communist Refoundation Party, more than ever, as well as all the other parties.

== Electoral system ==
The electoral system for the Senate was a strange hybrid which established a form of proportional representation into FPTP-like constituencies. A candidate needed a landslide victory of more than 65% of votes to obtain a direct mandate. All constituencies where this result was not reached entered into an at-large calculation based upon the D'Hondt method to distribute the seats between the parties, and candidates with the best percentages of suffrages inside their party list were elected.

== Results ==
Party	votes	votes (%)	seats	swing
Christian Democracy	1,414,109	25.2	14	▼4
Northern League	1,150,022	20.5	11	▲10
Democratic Party of the Left	726,737	12.9	7	▼5
Italian Socialist Party	694,008	12.4	7	▼1
Communist Refoundation	316,355	5.6	3	▲2
Italian Republican Party	232,292	4.1	2	=
Italian Social Movement	197,110	3.5	1	▼1
Federation of the Greens	175,721	3.1	1	=
Italian Liberal Party	143,473	2.6	1	=
Lombard Alpine League	119,153	2.1	1	▲1
Others & PSDI & PR	452,169	8.0	-	▼2
Total parties	5,621,749	100.0	48	=

Sources: Italian Ministry of the Interior
Note: PRC as a spinoff of PCI/PDS merged with DP.

=== Constituencies ===
N°	Constituency	Elected	Party	Votes %	Others
1	Bergamo	Renato Ravasio; Speroni's second election	Christian Democracy	33.5% 22.6%	seat ceded to Pagliarini
2	Clusone	Severino Citaristi; Luigi Moretti; Elidio De Paoli	Christian Democracy; Northern League; Lombard Alpine League	37.3% 26.3% 3.5%	
3	Treviglio	Andreino Carrara; Giancarlo Pagliarini	Christian Democracy; Northern League	33.9% 20.7%	
4	Brescia	Mino Martinazzoli; Francesco Tabladini	Christian Democracy; Northern League	30.8% 22.3%	
5	Breno	Maria Paola Colombo; Vittorio Marniga	Christian Democracy; Italian Socialist Party	32.9% 14.0%	
6	Chiari	Bruno Ferrari; Leoni already elected	Christian Democracy	35.4% 21.4%	
7	Salò	Elio Fontana; Luigi Roscia	Christian Democracy; Northern League	30.5% 24.3%	
8	Como	Gianfranco Miglio	Northern League	27.6%	
9	Lecco	Cesare Golfari; Luigi Roveda	Christian Democracy; Northern League	29.8% 22.5%	
10	Cantù	Giuseppe Guzzetti; Elia Manara	Christian Democracy; Northern League	28.8% 25.4%	
11	Cremona	Walter Montini; Marco Pezzoni	Christian Democracy; Democratic Party of the Left	26.6% 16.9%	
12	Crema	Mario Campagnoli	Christian Democracy	31.4%	
13	Mantua	Roberto Borroni	Democratic Party of the Left	16.6%	Paolo Gibertoni (LN) 20.3%
14	Ostiglia	Giuseppe Chiarante; Gino Scevarolli	Democratic Party of the Left; Italian Socialist Party	25.3% 14.2%	
15	Milan 1	Antonio Maccanico; Carlo Scognamiglio	Italian Republican Party; Italian Liberal Party	16.6% 9.0%	
16	Milan 2	Giorgio Covi; Unconstitutional result Unconstitutional result	Italian Republican Party	11.1% 6.2% 4.5%	seat ceded to Resta seat ceded to Molinari
17	Milan 3	Giuseppe Resta	Italian Social Movement	5.3%	
18	Milan 4	Maccanico's second election		12.2%	seat ceded to Covi
19	Milan 5	Agata Alma Campiello; Emilio Molinari	Italian Socialist Party; Federation of the Greens	13.7% 4.2%	
20	Milan 6	Giovanna Senesi; Giorgio Ruffolo	Democratic Party of the Left; Italian Socialist Party	16.5% 14.5%	
21	Abbiategrasso	Achille Cutrera	Italian Socialist Party	14.5%	
22	Rho	Carlo Smuraglia; Giorgio Gangi; Luigi Vinci	Democratic Party of the Left; Italian Socialist Party; Communist Refoundation	16.7% 14.3% 7.7%	
23	Monza	None elected			
24	Vimercate	Luigi Granelli	Christian Democracy	25.7%	
25	Lodi	Anna Maria Pedrazzi	Democratic Party of the Left	18.3%	
26	Pavia	Pierangelo Giovannoli	Democratic Party of the Left	15.6%	
27	Voghera	Luigi Meriggi	Communist Refoundation	7.7%	
28	Vigevano	Carlo Pisati; Armando Cossutta	Northern League; Communist Refoundation	21.8% 8.9%	
29	Sondrio	Vittorino Colombo; Giampaolo Paini; Francesco Forte	Christian Democracy; Northern League; Italian Socialist Party	29.8% 23.7% 16.4%	
30	Varese	Giuseppe Zamberletti; Giuseppe Leoni	Christian Democracy; Northern League	26.1% 25.3%	
31	Busto Arsizio	Francesco Speroni	Northern League	27.8%	

- No senator obtained a direct mandate. The electoral system was, in the other cases, a form of proportional representation and not a FPTP race: so candidates winning with a simple plurality could have (and usually had) a candidate (usually a Christian democrat) with more votes in their constituency.

=== Substitutions ===
- Paolo Gibertoni for Mantua (20.3%) replaced Luigi Moretti in 1992. Reason: resignation.
