= 2006 Italian Senate election in Lombardy =

- 9 April 2006

All 47 Lombard seats in the Italian Senate
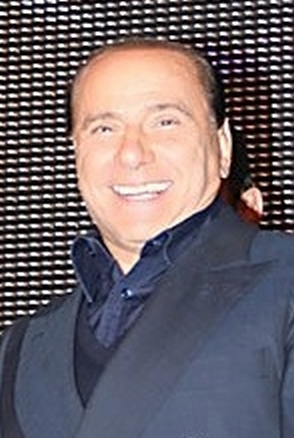

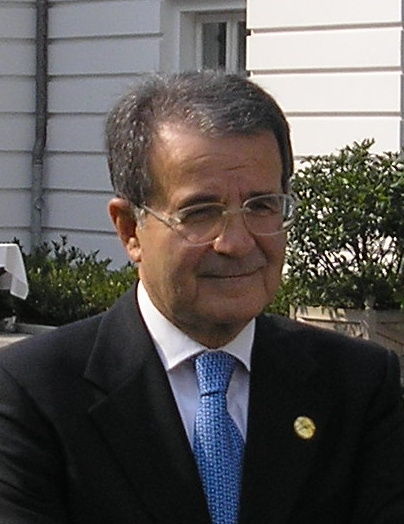
	Majority party	Minority party
Leader	Silvio Berlusconi	Romano Prodi
Party	Forza Italia	The Olive Tree
Alliance	House of Freedoms	The Union
Last election	33 seats, 44.8%	14 seats, 49.4% 33.7% as The Olive
Seats won	27	20
Seat change	-6	+6
Popular vote	3,342,468	2,501,467
Percentage	57.0%	42.6%
Swing	+12.2%	-6.8%
Majority before election
House of Freedoms
New Majority
House of Freedoms

Lombardy renewed its delegation to the Italian Senate on 9 April 2006. This election was a part of national Italian general election of 2006 even if, according to the Italian Constitution, every senatorial challenge in each Region is a single and independent race.

Differently from the national result, the election was won by the centre-right coalition of the House of Freedoms. Forza Italia was the largest party in the election with 28%, ahead of the Democrats of the Left (12%) and Lega Nord (11%). Eleven provinces gave a majority or a plurality to Silvio Berlusconi's alliance, while voters of the Province of Mantua supported the new Prime Minister of Italy Romano Prodi.

== Background ==
Silvio Berlusconi's House of Freedoms arrived to this election after a series of bad results. Forza Italia had lost 5 points at regional level during the 2004 European election, while the Province of Milan shifted to the left in the same occasion. 2005 regional election had confirmed centre-right Regional President Roberto Formigoni, but its coalition lost more than 8 points.

On the other side, in 2005 Romano Prodi had launched his new larger coalition, The Union, merging in a single alliance quite all oppositions to Berlusconi's majority: The Olive Tree, the Communist Refoundation Party and Antonio Di Pietro's Italy of Values, which in Lombardy were joined by the Lombard Autonomy League.

== Electoral law ==
The new electoral law for the Senate was established in 2005 by the Calderoli Law, and it is a form of semi-proportional representation. A party presents its own closed list and it can join other parties in alliances. The coalition which receives a plurality automatically wins at least 26 seats. Respecting this condition, seats are divided between coalitions, and subsequently to party lists, using the largest remainder method with a Hare quota. To receive seats, a party must overcome the barrage of 8% of the vote if it contests a single race, or of 3% of the vote if it runs in alliance.

== Results ==
Coalition leader	votes	votes (%)	seats	Party	votes	votes (%)	seats	change
Silvio Berlusconi	3,342,468	57.0	27	Forza Italia	1,623,745	27.7	14	-1
Silvio Berlusconi	3,342,468	57.0	27	Lega Nord	652,047	11.1	5	-4
Silvio Berlusconi	3,342,468	57.0	27	National Alliance	572,242	9.8	5	-2
Silvio Berlusconi	3,342,468	57.0	27	Union of Christian and Centre Democrats	343,269	5.9	3	+2
Silvio Berlusconi	3,342,468	57.0	27	Others	151,165	2.5	-	-1
Romano Prodi	2,501,467	42.6	20	Democrats of the Left	726,105	12.4	7	+3
Romano Prodi	2,501,467	42.6	20	Democracy is Freedom – The Daisy	588,856	10.0	6	+2
Romano Prodi	2,501,467	42.6	20	Communist Refoundation Party	407,939	7.0	4	+3
Romano Prodi	2,501,467	42.6	20	Together with the Union	588,856	4.8	3	=
Romano Prodi	2,501,467	42.6	20	Italy of Values	150,116	2.6	-	-1
Romano Prodi	2,501,467	42.6	20	Rose in the Fist	128,849	2.2	-	-
Romano Prodi	2,501,467	42.6	20	Others	220,050	3.8	-	-1
Others	25,193	0.4	-	Others	25,193	0.4	-	-
Total coalitions	5,869,128	100.0	47	Total parties	5,869,128	100.0	47	=

Source: Ministry of the Interior

== Lombard delegation to Senate ==
=== Forza Italia ===
- Roberto Formigoni
  - Obliged to resign on July 12. Substituted by Antonio Del Pennino.
- Guido Possa
- Ombretta Colli
- Gianfranco Rotondi
- Gianpiero Carlo Cantoni
- Marcello Dell'Utri
- Antonio Tomassini
- Nitto Francesco Palma
- Luigi Scotti
- Romano Comincioli
- Luigi Grillo
- Enrico Pianetta
- Valerio Carrara
- Egidio Sterpa

=== Democrats of the Left ===
- Gerardo D'Ambrosio
- Fiorenza Bassoli
- Furio Colombo
- Carlo Fontana
- Paolo Bodini
- Guido Galardi
- Giorgio Roilo

=== The Daisy ===
- Paolo Binetti
- Valerio Zanone
- Emanuela Baio
- Franco Danieli
- Daniele Bosone
- Paolo Rossi

=== Lega Nord ===
- Roberto Castelli
- Giuseppe Leoni
- Ettore Pirovano
- Dario Galli
- Dario Fruscio

=== National Alliance ===
- Alfredo Mantica
- Alessio Butti
- Giuseppe Valditara
- Stefano Losurdo
- Antonino Caruso

=== Communist Refoundation Party ===
- Maria Luisa Boccia
- Giovanna Capelli
- Giovanni Confalonieri
- Josè Luiz Del Roio

=== Union of Christian and Centre Democrats ===
- Rocco Buttiglione
- Graziano Maffioli
- Luigi Maninetti

=== Together with the Union ===
- Natale Ripamonti
- Maria Agostina Pellagatta
- Gianpaolo Silvestri

Source: Italian Senate
