= Zone 5 =

Zone 5 may refer to:

- London fare zone 5, of the Transport for London zonal system
- Hardiness zone, a geographically defined zone in which a specific category of plant life is capable of growing
- Zone 5 of Milan
- VO_{2} Max, known as Zone 5 in the five-heart rate zones model
- Zone 5 Technologies, an American missile company
