= Lega per l'Autonomia – Alleanza Lombarda =

Left-wing regionalist political party in Lombardy, Italy

- Leader: Elidio De Paoli
- Founded: 1996
- Merger of: Lega Alpina Lumbarda; Alleanza Lombarda Autonomia
- Ideology: Federalism; Lombard nationalism Regionalism
- Political position: Left-wing

Lega per l'Autonomia – Alleanza Lombarda (League for Autonomy – Lombard Alliance, LAL), also known as Lega per l'Autonomia Lombarda (League for the Lombard Autonomy), was a left-wing regionalist political party in Italy, based in Lombardy.

== History ==
The party was formed in the run-up of the 1996 Italian general election by the merger of Alleanza Lombarda Autonomia and Lega Alpina Lumbarda. The former was a 1989 split from the regional section Lega Lombarda of Lega Nord led by Angela Bossi and Pierangelo Brivio (wife and husband, sister and brother-in-law to Umberto Bossi respectively), while the latter was the political vehicle of Elidio De Paoli, who had been elected in the Senate of the Republic in 1992 and 1994. In the 1996 election, the party obtained 1.9% of the vote in Lombardy and none of its candidates was elected.

After a row between De Paoli and the couple Bossi-Brivio, the party was disbanded until 2001, when De Paoli re-organized it from scratch. In the 2001 Italian general election, the party won 5.4% for the Senate in Lombardy, and 0.9% nationally, as some disgruntled voters of Lega Nord and many undecided voters gave their vote to the party. De Paoli was elected senator with proportional representation after he had won 11.5% in the constituency of Albino. where he stole many votes from Roberto Calderoli, deputy for Albino since 1994 and most voted Lega Nord in 1996 (51.9%), who was elected with 44.2%.

In the 2006 Italian general election, the party was affiliated to The Union, the centre-left coalition led by Romano Prodi, and its 0.1%, as a result of a 1.6% in Lombardy, was decisive for the coalition's victory over the House of Freedoms, the centre-right coalition led by Silvio Berlusconi. Subsequently, De Paoli was appointed undersecretary in the second Prodi government.

In the 2008 Italian general election, the party won 0.8% for the Senate in Lombardy. In 2009, the Ministry of the Interior under the third Berlusconi government assigned the party's symbol to Matteo Brivio, son of the Bossi-Brivio couple. Consequently, De Paoli returned to use Lega Alpina Lumbarda's symbol, with disappointing results. Since 2008, the party did not participate in any major electoral competition and Brivio joined Lega Nord.

== Popular support ==
Electoral results of the party in Lombardy For general elections, the results always refer to the Senate
1996 general	1999 European	2000 regional	2001 general	2004 European	2005 regional	2006 general	2008 general
1.9	-	-	5.4	1.2	-	1.6	0.8

== See also ==
- 1996 Italian Senate election in Lombardy
- 2001 Italian Senate election in Lombardy
- 2006 Italian Senate election in Lombardy
- 2008 Italian Senate election in Lombardy
