= Lega Alpina Lumbarda =

Left-wing regionalist political party in Lombardy, Italy

Lombard Alpine League Lega Alpina Lumbarda
- Leader: Roberto Gremmo
- Founded: 1992
- Dissolved: 1996
- Merged into: Lega per l'Autonomia – Alleanza Lombarda
- Ideology: Federalism; Lombard nationalism Regionalism
- Political position: Left-wing

Lega Alpina Lumbarda (English: Lombard Alpine League, LAL) was a left-wing regionalist political party in Italy. Based in Lombardy, the party was an alternative to Lega Nord and its regional section Lega Lombarda, and was led by Elidio De Paoli throughout its existence.

== History ==
The party was founded in 1992 by De Paoli, a former blue-collar worker, local leader of the Marxist–Leninist League, and municipal councillor for the Federation of the Greens in Brescia. De Paoli was elected a member of the Senate of the Republic in the 1992 Italian general election (when the party won 2.1% in Lombardy), and was re-elected in the 1994 Italian general election (4.3%).

For the 1996 Italian general election, the party joined forces with Alleanza Lombarda Autonomia (a 1989 split from Lega Lombarda, led by Angela Bossi and Pierangelo Brivio, sister and brother-in-law of Umberto Bossi respectively), forming Lega per l'Autonomia – Alleanza Lombarda. In 2009, Lega Alpina Lumbarda, led by De Paoli, filed lists in some Lombard provincial elections. The list gained everywhere less than 1%.

== Popular support ==
Electoral results of the party in Lombardy For general elections, the results always refer to the Senate
1992 general	1994 general	1994 European	1995 regional
2.1	4.3	0.9	-

== See also ==
- 1992 Italian Senate election in Lombardy
- 1994 European Parliament election in Italy
- 1994 Italian Senate election in Lombardy
- 1995 Lombard regional election
- 1996 Italian Senate election in Lombardy
