= Francesco Ferrari =

Francesco Ferrari may refer to:

- Francesco Ferrari (bishop) (died 1507), Italian Roman Catholic bishop
- Francesco Ferrari (painter) (1634–1708), Italian painter
- Francesco Ferrari (architect) (1703–1744), Italian architect
- Francesco Ferrari (politician, born 1905) (1905–1975), Italian politician
- Francesco Ferrari (politician, born 1946), Italian politician
- Francesco Ferrari (water polo), participated for Italy at the 2005 Mediterranean Games
- Francesco Ferrari (basketball) (born 2005), Italian basketball player
