= Alleanza Lombarda Autonomia =

Lombard Alliance Autonomy Alleanza Lombarda Autonomia
- Leader: Pierangelo Brivio
- Founded: 1989
- Dissolved: 1996
- Split from: Lombard League
- Merged into: League for Autonomy – Lombard Alliance
- Ideology: Federalism; Lombard regionalism

Lombard Alliance Autonomy (Alleanza Lombarda Autonomia), initially called Lombard Alliance (Alleanza Lombarda), was a regionalist political party in Italy, based in Lombardy.

The party was founded in 1989 as a split from Lombard League (LL) by Angela Bossi and Pierangelo Brivio, a married couple. They were respectively sister and brother-in-law to Umberto Bossi, then national secretary of the Lombard League and later federal secretary of the Northern League. In the 1990 regional election, despite running lists only in three provincial constituencies (Como 3.2%, Varese 2.8% and Milan 1.6%), the party won 1.2% at the regional level and elected one regional councillor, in Milan.

In the 1992 general election the party gained a mere 0.6% for the Senate in Lombardy. Indead, two years later, it presented itself to the general election with the name The League of Angela Bossi (La Lega di Angela Bossi) and gained 1.3% of the vote.

In 1996 the party joined forces with Lombard Alpine League, forming the League for Autonomy – Lombard Alliance. The new party obtained 1.9%.

The party tried an unsuccessful comeback in 2006 and has since disappeared.
