= 1996 Italian Senate election in Lombardy =

- April 21, 1996

All 47 Lombard seats in the Italian Senate
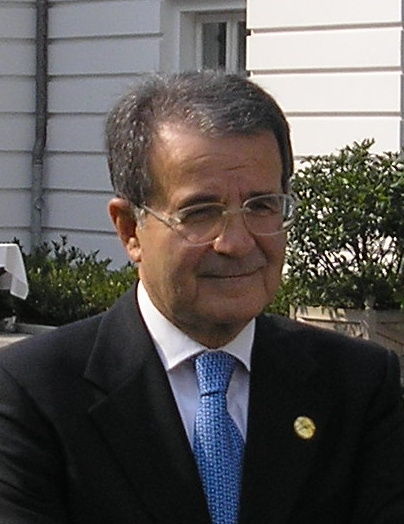

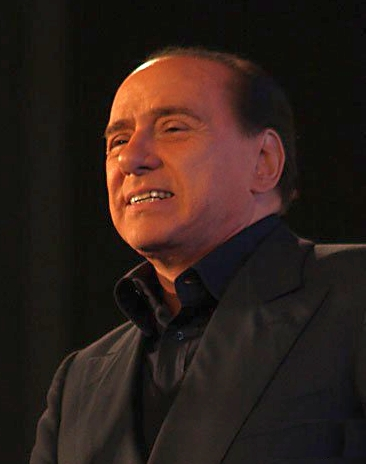
	Majority party	Minority party
Leader	Romano Prodi	Silvio Berlusconi
Party	The Olive Tree	Forza Italia
Alliance	The Olive Tree	Pole for Freedoms
Last election	6 seats, 34.2%	10 seats sum of member parties
Seats won	19	16
Seat change	▲13	▲6
Popular vote	1,924,113	1,853,453
Percentage	33.7%	32.8%
Swing	-0.5%	-10.8%
Majority before election
Pole of Freedoms
New Plurality
The Olive Tree

Lombardy renewed its delegation to the Italian Senate on April 21, 1996. This election was a part of national Italian general election of 1996 even if, according to the Italian Constitution, every senatorial challenge in each Region is a single and independent race.

The election was won by the centre-left coalition called The Olive Tree.

== Electoral system ==
The intricate electoral system introduced in 1993, called Mattarella Law, provided 75% of the seats in the Senate as elected by first-past-the-post system, whereas the remaining 25% was assigned by a special proportional method that actually assigned the remaining seats to minority parties.

== Results ==
Coalition	votes	votes (%)	seats	Party	seats	change
The Olive Tree	1,928,868	34.2	19	Democratic Party of the Left	11	▲8
The Olive Tree	1,928,868	34.2	19	Italian People's Party	4	▲1
The Olive Tree	1,928,868	34.2	19	Federation of the Greens	2	▲2
The Olive Tree	1,928,868	34.2	19	Italian Renewal	1	▲1
The Olive Tree	1,928,868	34.2	19	Italian Republican Party	1	▲1
Pole for Freedoms	1,853,453	32.8	16	Forza Italia	10	▲1
Pole for Freedoms	1,853,453	32.8	16	National Alliance	5	▲4
Pole for Freedoms	1,853,453	32.8	16	Federalist Party	1	▲1
Northern League	1,376,124	24.4	11	Northern League	11	▼15
Alliance of Progressives	50,235	0.9	1	Communist Refoundation Party	1	▼1
Others	437,745	7.7	-	Others	-	-
Total coalitions	5,646,425	100.0	47	Total parties	47	=

Sources: Ministry of the Interior, Italian Senate

=== Constituencies ===
N°	Constituency	Winner	Alliance	Party	Votes %	Losers
1	Milan Central	Carlo Scognamiglio	Pole for Freedoms	Forza Italia	47.9%	G. Bianchini (Olive) 35.2% L. Rossi (League) 10.9%
2	Milan East	Saverio Vertone	Pole for Freedoms	Forza Italia	46.4%	Vera Squarcialupi (Olive) 36.2% G. Galimberti (League) 11.5%
3	Milan West	Riccardo De Corato	Pole for Freedoms	National Alliance	46.5%	Felice Besostri (Olive) 35.4% P. Arpesani (League) 11.7%
4	Milan South	Roberto Lasagna	Pole for Freedoms	Forza Italia	41.5%	Antonio Duva (Olive) 38.6% M. Bedoni (League) 13.1%
5	Milan North	Leopoldo Elia		Italian People's Party	43.6%	L. Strik (Pannella) 23.1% M. Frigerio (League) 16.4%
6	Sesto San Giovanni	Antonio Pizzinato		Democratic Party of the Left	42.7%	Sergio Travaglia (Pole) 38.1% C. Pedrazzini (League) 12.9%
7	Lodi	Gianni Piatti		Democratic Party of the Left	39.7%	Michele Bucci (Pole) 34.8% G. Finaguerra (League) 17.2%
8	Rozzano	Carlo Smuraglia		Democratic Party of the Left	40.8%	Antonino Caruso (Pole) 40.1% G. Lombardi (League) 12.7%
9	Abbiategrasso	Francesco Servello	Pole for Freedoms	National Alliance	34.4%	F. Bonetti (Olive) 33.0% G. Gadda (League) 25.5%
10	Rho	Fiorello Cortiana		Federation of the Greens	36.5%	F. Tofoni (Pole) 34.9% G. Carnovali (League) 23.6%
11	Bollate	Ornella Piloni		Democratic Party of the Left	38.1%	P. Balzano (Pole) 34.0% E. Busnelli (League) 21.5%
12	Cinisello Balsamo	Patrizia Toia		Italian People's Party	43.8%	Enrico Rizzi (Pole) 35.0% G. Tronconi (League) 15.2%
13	Seregno	Ettore Rotelli	Pole for Freedoms	Forza Italia	36.3%	M. Pulcini (Olive) 29.8% C. Monti (League) 27.6%
14	Monza	Alfredo Mantica	Pole for Freedoms	National Alliance	38.1%	Anna Maria Bernasconi (Olive) 37.0% E. Merlo (League) 19.3%
15	Melzo	Loris Maconi		Democratic Party of the Left	41.6%	M. Staglieno (Pole) 33.4% S. Motta (League) 19.4%
16	Cologno Monzese	Natale Ripamonti		Federation of the Greens	40.2%	Enrico Pianetta (Pole) 39.0% C. Marchini (League) 13.8%
17	Varese	Piero Pellicini	Pole for Freedoms	National Alliance	33.1%	M. Astuti (Olive) 29.9% Giuseppe Leoni (League) 29.7%
18	Gallarate	Luigi Peruzzotti	Northern League	Northern League	34.6%	G. Martinoli (Olive) 29.9% G. Margutti (Pole) 29.2%
19	Busto Arsizio	Antonio Tomassini	Pole for Freedoms	Forza Italia	32.8%	Francesco Speroni (League) 32.0% M. Maggioni (Olive) 29.2%
20	Como	Gianfranco Miglio	Pole for Freedoms	Federalist Party	35.2%	G. Peruzzo (Olive) 29.3% G. Ostinelli (League) 27.2%
21	Cantù	Elia Manara	Northern League	Northern League	32.3%	G. Manfredi (Pole) 31.3% P. Giovanni (Olive) 29.5%
22	Brescia	Alessandro Pardini		Democratic Party of the Left	38.9%	R. Conti (Pole) 30.6% G. Giudici (League) 24.7%
23	Lumezzane	Francesco Tabladini	Northern League	Northern League	41.8%	A. Gregorelli (Olive) 30.9% L. Becchetti (Pole) 25.4%
24	Desenzano del Garda	Giovanni Bruni		Italian Renewal	33.1%	Massimo Wilde (League) 31.0% I. Formentini (Pole) 28.4%
25	Chiari	Francesco Tirelli	Northern League	Northern League	32.9%	B. Mazzotti (Olive) 32.3% G.Gei (Pole) 27.8%
26	Suzzara	Piergiorgio Bergonzi	Alliance of Progressives	Communist Refoundation Party	34.3%	F. Marenghi (Pole) 30.5% I. Maffini (League) 24.7%
27	Mantua	Roberto Borroni		Democratic Party of the Left	43.9%	R. Freddi (Pole) 28.3% A. Cattaneo (League) 20.2%
28	Cremona	Angelo Rescaglio		Italian People's Party	38.7%	G. Galli (Pole) 31.9% B. Bruttomesso (League) 21.8%
29	Pavia	Tullio Montagna		Democratic Party of the Left	37.0%	G. Beccaria (Pole) 34.6% L. Verderio (League) 19.2%
30	Vigevano	Domenico Contestabile	Pole for Freedoms	Forza Italia	37.8%	C. Broli (Olive) 34.6% G. Desigis (League) 19.3%
31	Bergamo	Giovanni Zilio		Italian People's Party	32.3%	Sergio Rossi (League) 31.9% L. Caputo (Pole) 29.1%
32	Albino	Vito Gnutti	Northern League	Northern League	44.8%	G. Giupponi (Olive) 26.7% G. Bettera (Pole) 22.3%
33	Treviglio	Massimo Dolazza	Northern League	Northern League	35.5%	L. Gelpi (Olive) 29.5% M. Signorelli (Pole) 27.7%
34	Sondrio	Fiorello Provera	Northern League	Northern League	36.8%	M. Gallo (Pole) 28.6% R. Pedrini (Olive) 27.0%
35	Lecco	Roberto Castelli	Northern League	Northern League	33.3%	V. Addis (Olive) 32.9% P. Fiocchi (Pole) 27.1%

=== Additional senators ===
- Pole for Freedoms
1. Antonino Caruso (National Alliance, 40.1%)
2. Enrico Pianetta (Forza Italia, 39.0%)
3. Sergio Travaglia (Forza Italia, 38.1%)
4. Enrico Rizzi (Forza Italia, 35.0%)
5. Michele Bucci (Forza Italia, 34.8%)
- The Olive Tree
1. Antonio Duva (Italian Republican Party, 38.6%)
2. Anna Maria Bernasconi (Democratic Party of the Left, 37.0%)
3. Vera Squarcialupi (Democratic Party of the Left, 36.2%)
4. Felice Besostri (Democratic Party of the Left, 35.4%)
- Lega Nord
1. Francesco Speroni (Lega Nord, 32.0%)
2. Sergio Rossi (Lega Nord, 31.9%)
3. Massimo Wilde (Lega Nord, 31.0%)
