= Hunting – Fishing – Environment =

Hunting – Fishing – Environment Caccia – Pesca – Ambiente
- President: Alessandro Fiumani
- Secretary: Maurizio Montagnani
- Founded: 1985
- Headquarters: Via del lanificio 15/C – Terni
- Ideology: Hunters and fishermen's interests Environmentalism

Website
- www.cpacacciapescaambiente.com

Hunting – Fishing – Environment (Caccia – Pesca – Ambiente, C.P.A.) is an Italian association founded in 1985 by Carlo Maltagliati, with the aim of defending the interests of hunters and fishermen. In the local elections of 1985 the CPA list managed to win about 50 city councilors, including its president Carlo Maltagliati, elected in Montecatini.

In 1990 Italian regional elections CPA wons 4 regional seats, specifically in Veneto (1.5%), Tuscany (3.1%), Marche (2.1%) and Umbria (3.3%). Maltagliati was elected regional councilor in Tuscany, and after the end of his mandate in 1995 left CPA to found another association, Hunting – Fishing – Ecology (CPE). In 1995 CPA signed an electoral agreement with National Alliance to present itself in joint lists in the regional and local elections in Umbria. After the 1990s, CPA never ran for election again.

== Election results ==
=== Italian Parliament ===
Chamber of Deputies
Election year	No. of overall votes	% of overall vote	No. of overall seats won	+/–	Leader
1987	55,911	0.14	0 / 630	–	Carlo Maltagliati
1992	193,228	0.49	0 / 630	–	Carlo Maltagliati

Senate of the Republic
Election year	No. of overall votes	% of overall vote	No. of overall seats won	+/–	Leader
1987	41,135	0.13	0 / 315	–	Carlo Maltagliati
1992	116,395	0.35	0 / 315	–	Carlo Maltagliati
