= Vigentino =

Coordinates: 45°25′59″N 9°12′04″E

- Quartier of Milan
- Interactive map of Vigentino
- Country: Italy
- Region: Lombardy
- Province: Milan
- Comune: Milan
- Zone: 5
- Time zone: UTC+1 (CET)
  - Summer (DST): UTC+2 (CEST)

Vigentino is a district ("quartiere") of Milan, Italy, part of the Zone 5 administrative division, located south of the city centre. Before 1923, Vigentino was an autonomous, rural comune. By the mid 20th century, agricultural activities were dismissed, and the area was largely urbanized, with the construction of large apartment blocks.

The name "Vigentino" comes from viginti, the Latin word for "twenty"; this is because Vigentino lies on the road from Milan to Pavia, 20 miles before Pavia. The road has been a major thoroughfare in Lombardy since the Middle Ages; the walls of Milan had a city gate on that road, Porta Vigentina, which was named after Vigentino.

The main historic centre of Vigentino is at the crossing of Via Ripamonti, Via Quaranta and Via Solaroli. A sort of secondary centre (which is sometimes considered a district in its own, and in that case is referred to as Quartiere Fatima) is located between Via Broni and Via Chopin. The district is connected to the city centre by tramway line 24, while bus routes 34 and 95 link it with the M2 metro at Famagosta and the M3 at Corvetto and at Brenta. Bus route 99 reaches from Vigentino outwards to the city limits near the comune of Opera, and further interurban routes lead to other comuni lying south of Milan. Exit n.8 of the A50 Tangenziale Ovest motorway ring road leads to Vigentino through via Ripamonti.

As many ex-rural, ex-industrial districts of the southern periphery of Milan, Vigentino is relatively degraded, affected by environmental problems (such as infestations of rats and illegal rubbish dumps) as well as social problems, such as slums of immigrants and Romani nomads.

A major landmark of Vigentino are the "Cortili di Via Matera" ("courtyards of Via Matera"), a neighborhood that has been realized in the place where an old industrial depot used to be, and that includes houses, offices, and a theatre, called "Teatro del Vigentino". This place was included in a list of the 100 most important courtyards of Milan by Milan's Tourism Office.

== History ==
Vigentino used to belong to the pieve of San Donato Milanese. Under Napoleonic rule, it was briefly annexed to Milan, but regained its autonomy with the Kingdom of Lombardy–Venetia. At the unification of Italy, its population was 797. In 1869, the nearby communes of Quintosole and Vaiano Valle were annexed to Vigentino; in turn, Vigentino became part of Milan in 1923. In the first decades of the 20th century, partly of a consequence of the construction of the nearby Porta Romana railway station, the Vigentino district became an industrial area, the main commercial activities being a naphtha depot and a foundry; later on, the transition to a fully industrial context was further boosted when Officine Meccaniche (a car manufacturer) and Centrale del Latte di Milano (a dairy factory) established facilities in the area. Industrial activities were dismissed in the last decades of the 20th century, and Vigentino became a mostly residential district.

== Notable people ==
Enzo Bearzot, football player and manager, lived in Vigentino for several years, and his funeral was held there, in the church of "Santa Maria al Paradiso".
