= Zone 5 of Milan =

Coordinates: 45.416987°N 9.238333°E

Zona 5 di Milano Municipality 5
- Municipality of Milan
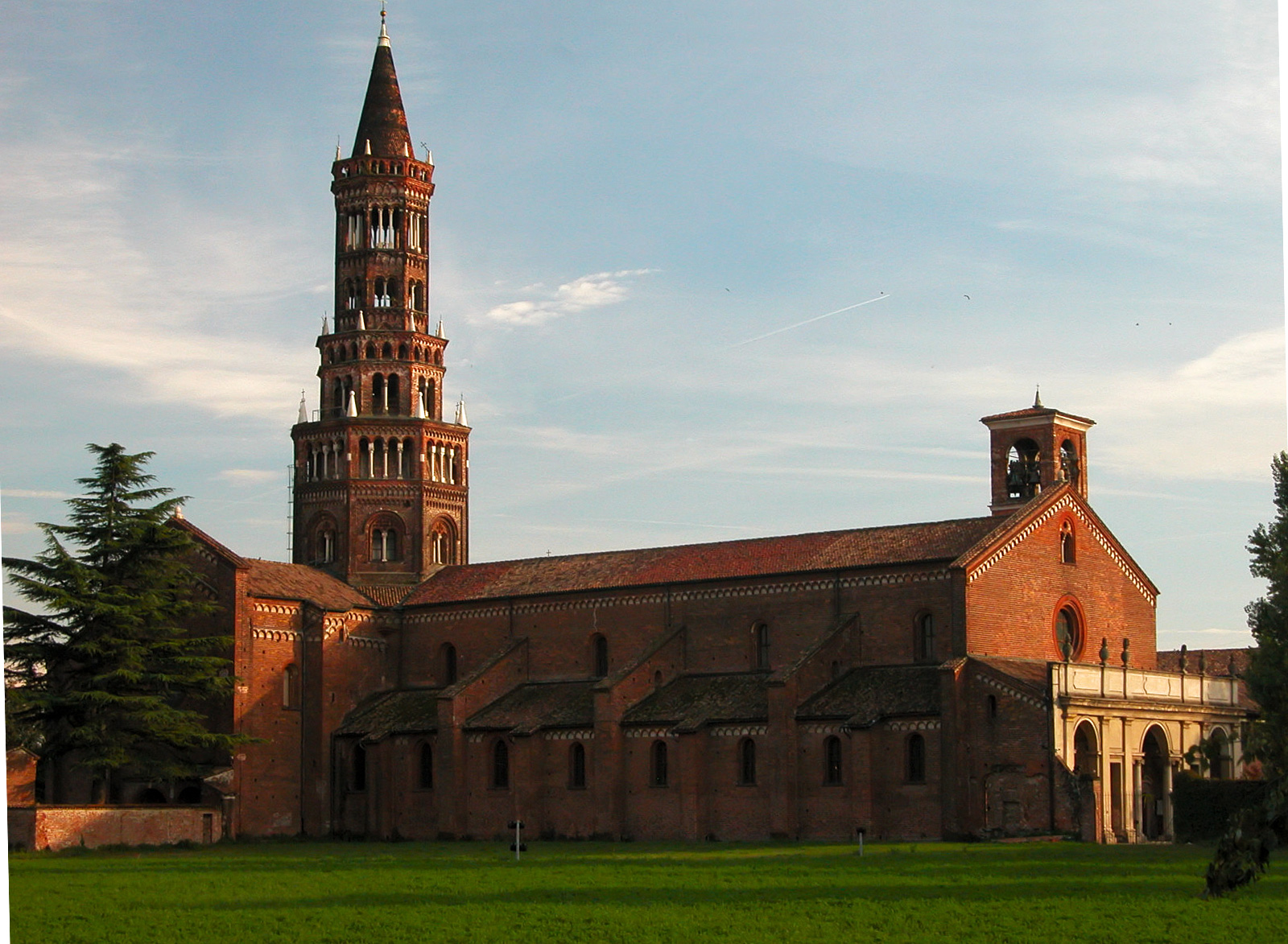
- Chiaravalle Abbey

- Location of Municipality 5 of Milan
- Country: Italy
- Region: Lombardy
- Province: Metro City of Milan
- Comune: Milan

Government
  - President: Natale Carapellese (PD)

Area
  - Total: 11.53 sq mi (29.87 km^{2})

Population (2022)
  - Total: 124,094
- Time zone: UTC+1 (CET)
  - Summer (DST): UTC+2 (CEST)
- Website: Municipality 5

The Zone 5 of Milan, since 2016 officially Municipality 5 of Milan, (in Italian: Zona 5 di Milano, Municipio 5 di Milano) is one of the 9 administrative divisions of Milan, Italy.

It was officially created as an administrative subdivision during the 1980s. On 14 April 2016, in order to promote a reform on the municipal administrative decentralization, the City Council of Milan established the new Municipality 5, a new administrative body responsible for running most local services, such as schools, social services, waste collection, roads, parks, libraries and local commerce.

== Subdivision ==
The borough includes the following districts:

- Basmetto;
- Cantalupa;
- Case Nuove;
- Chiaravalle, located in the periphery south of the city centre, within the Parco Agricolo Sud Milano nature reserve. Despite being annexed to Milan in 1923, Chiaravalle has maintained the character of an autonomous town. The park that embraces the district also separates it from the urban agglomeration of the city. This isolation is reinforced by the scarceness of public transportation to the centre, which mostly consists of a single bus line connecting Chiaravalle to Porta Romana. As this bus line has a stop at the Milan Metro station of Corvetto, this is the subway station that serves Chiaravalle, despite that of Rogoredo being closer. The main landmark of the Chiaravalle district is eponymous abbey, a Gothic-Romanesque 12th century monastic complex;
- Chiesa Rossa, a social residential district realized between 1960 and 1966;
- Conca Fallata;
- Fatima;
- Gratosoglio, located at southernmost end of the city, bordering on the comune of Rozzano, and it is traversed by the Lambro river. The district has an area of about 400,000 m^{2}. Having started as a commuter town in the 1960s, with large prefabricated apartment blocks destined to house immigrant workers coming from the South of Italy, the district is usually listed among those most degraded (e.g., having the highest crime rates) in the surroundings of Milan;
- Le Terrazze;
- Macconago, autonomous comune until 1923;
- Missaglia;
- Morivione;
- Porta Lodovica, named after the city gate of the Spanish walls;
- Porta Vigentina, named after one of the city gates in the Spanish walls;
- Quintosole, a rural district located within the Parco Agricolo Sud Milano nature reserve;
- Ronchetto delle Rane;
- San Gottardo;
- Selvanesco;
- Stadera;
- Torretta;
- Vaiano Valle, located south of the city's urban area, within the Parco Agricolo Sud Milano nature reserve;
- Vigentino, autonomous comune until 1923.

== Municipal government ==
The area has its own local authority called Consiglio di Municipio (Municipal Council), composed by the President and 30 members directly elected by citizens every five years. The Council is responsible for most local services, such as schools, social services, waste collection, roads, parks, libraries and local commerce in the area, and manages funds (if any) provided by the city government for specific purposes, such as those intended to guarantee the right to education for poorer families.

The current President is Natale Carapellese (PD), elected on 3–4 October 2021.

Here is the current composition of the Municipal Council after 2021 municipal election:

Alliance or political party	Members		Composition
Alliance or political party	2021–2026		Composition
Centre-left (PD-EV)	18	18 / 30	
Centre-right (FI-L-FdI-UDC)	11	11 / 30	
M5S	1	1 / 30	

Here is a full lists of the directly elected Presidents of Municipio since 2011:

President	Term of office		Party
Aldo Ugliano	16 May 2011	27 June 2016	PD
Alessandro Bramati	27 June 2016	8 October 2021	NCD
Natale Carapellese	8 October 2021	Incumbent	PD

== Education ==
Bocconi University Campus

The most important university located in the borough is the Bocconi University, founded in 1902 by Ferdinando Bocconi and was named after his son, who died in the Battle of Adwa during the First Italo-Ethiopian War. The university was originally affiliated with the Polytechnic University of Milan engineering school and incorporated a teaching model that was based on what was in use at the École Supérieure of Antwerp.

The university provides education in the fields of economics, finance, law, business administration, management, political science, public administration, information science, data science, and computer science. Bocconi is a founding member of CEMS - The Global Alliance in Management Education, and the university through its graduate business school, SDA Bocconi School of Management, has received triple accreditation from the AACSB, EQUIS, and the AMBA where it offers MBA, Executive MBA, DBA, professional development, executive education, and professional certification programs.

== Parks and gardens ==
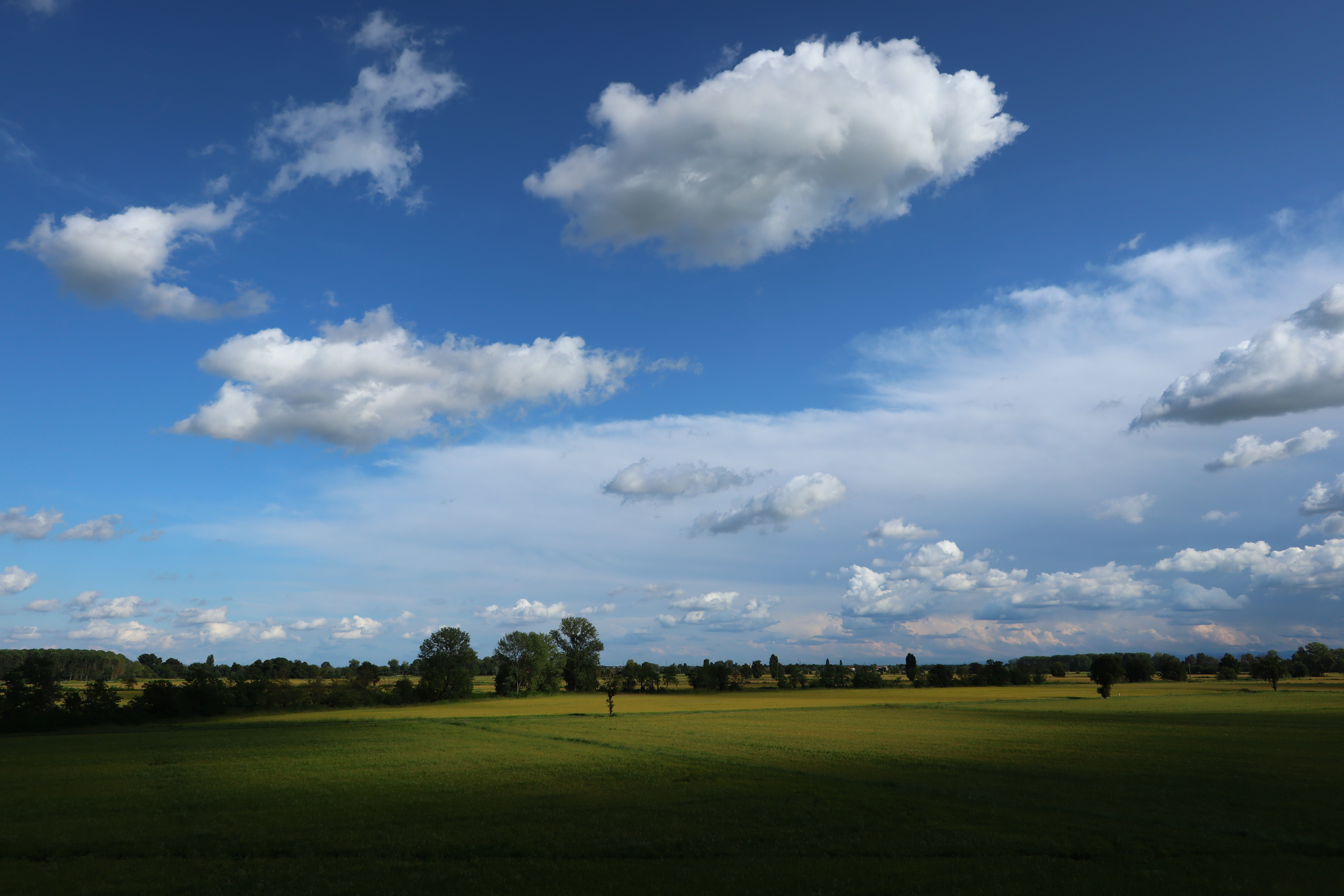
Parco Agricolo Sud Milano is a large protected rural area located south of Milan.

In this borough there are many public parks and gardens. The most significant natural area is Parco Agricolo Sud Milano (47,000 ha). Opened in 1990, the park has the purpose of preserving, safeguarding, and enhancing the natural and historical heritage of the Po Valley.

== Transport ==
Stations of Milan Metro in the Zone 5:

- Abbiategrasso;
- Lodi T.I.B.B., Porta Romana.

Suburban railway stations in the Zone 5:

- Milano Porta Romana
- Milano Tibaldi

== Gallery ==
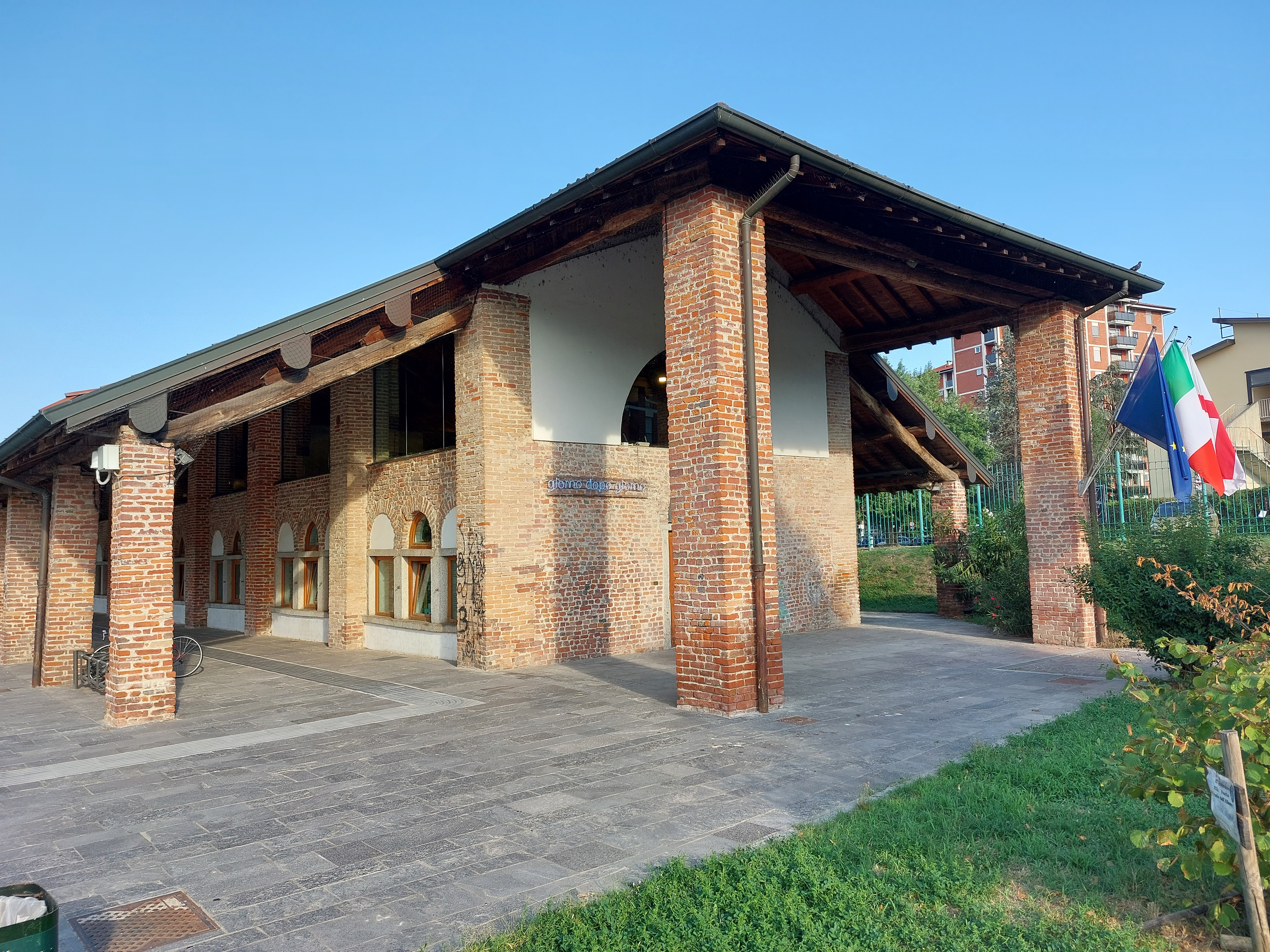
Chiesa Rossa public library

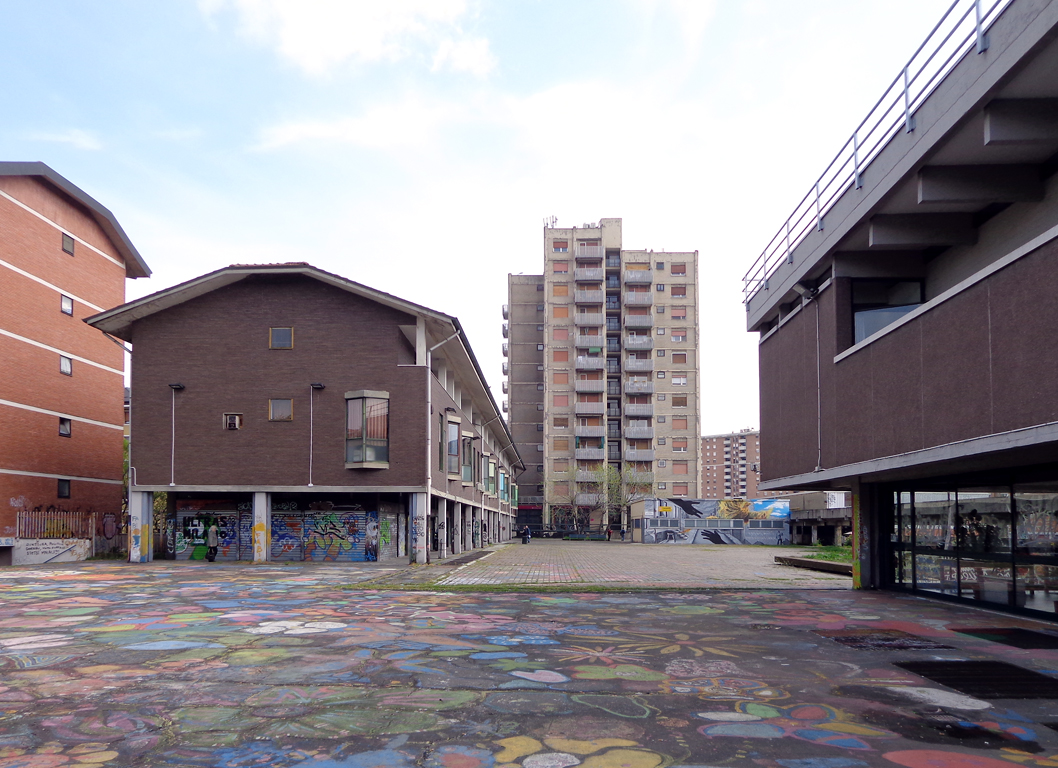
Chiesa Rossa civic centre

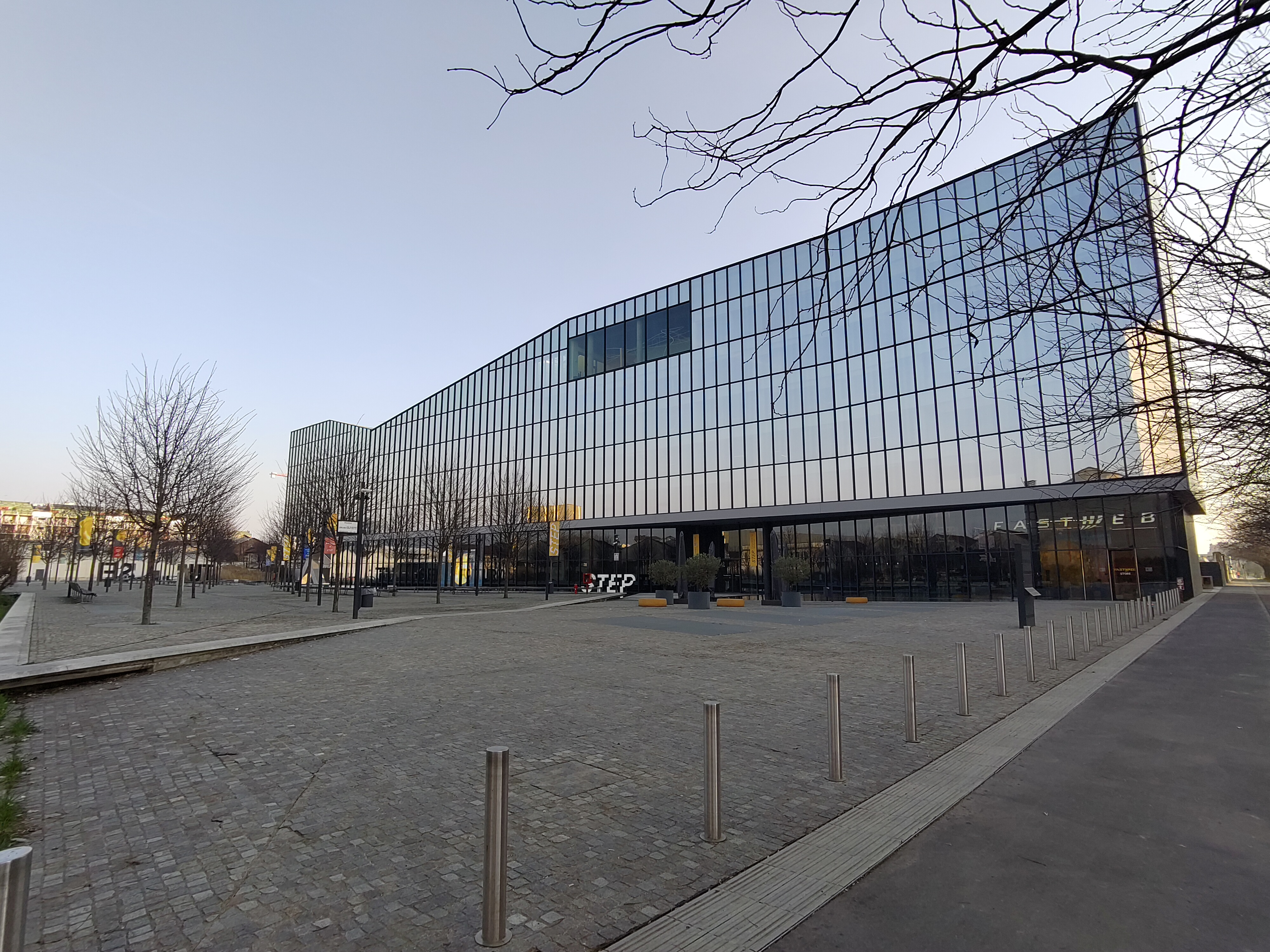
Fastweb headquarter

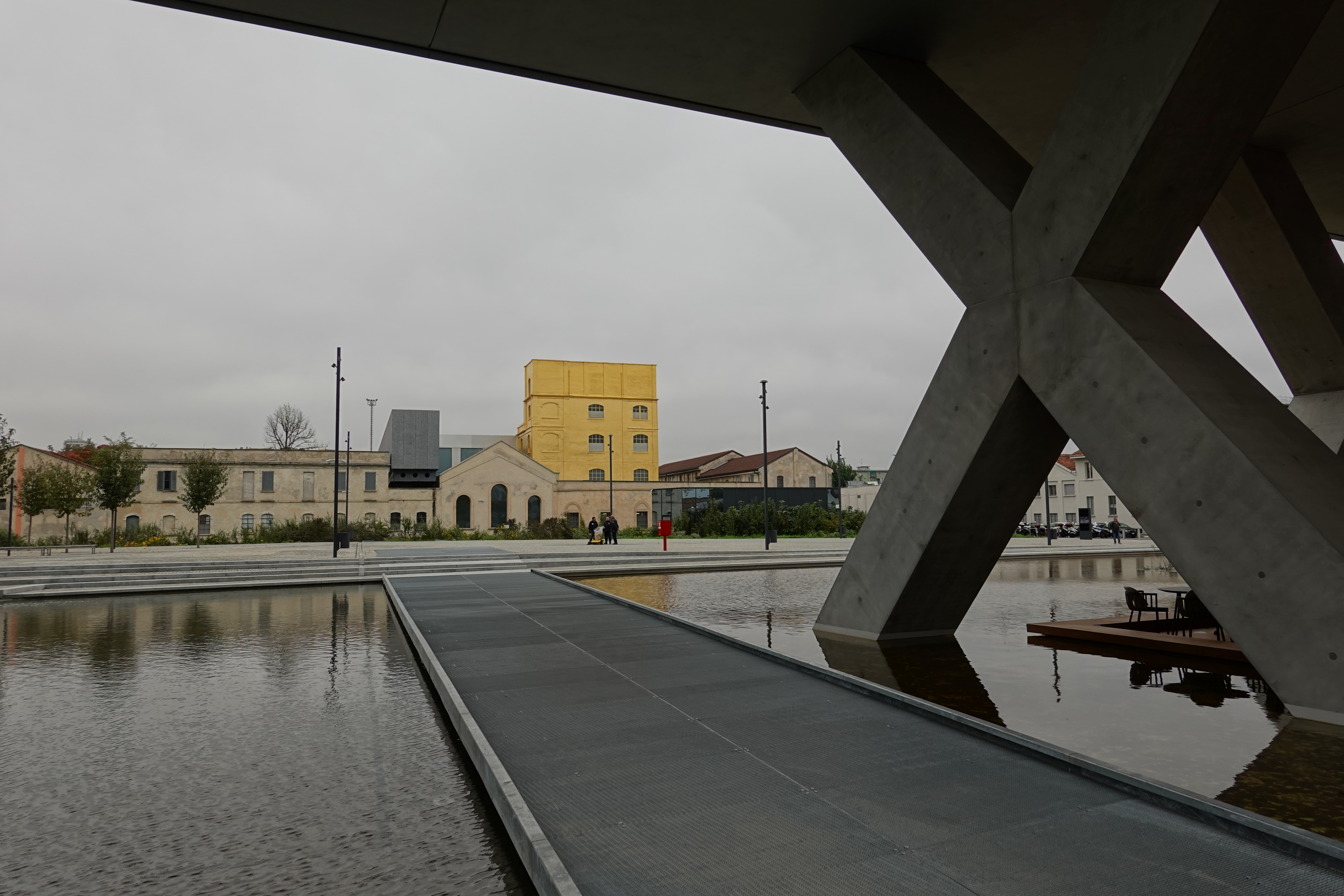
Fondazione Prada

== Maps ==
Map of Milan Zone 5
