= Quintosole =

Coordinates: 45°24′08″N 9°12′16″E

- Quartiere of Milan
- Interactive map of Quintosole
- Country: Italy
- Region: Lombardy
- Province: Milan
- Comune: Milan
- Zone: 5
- Time zone: UTC+1 (CET)
  - Summer (DST): UTC+2 (CEST)

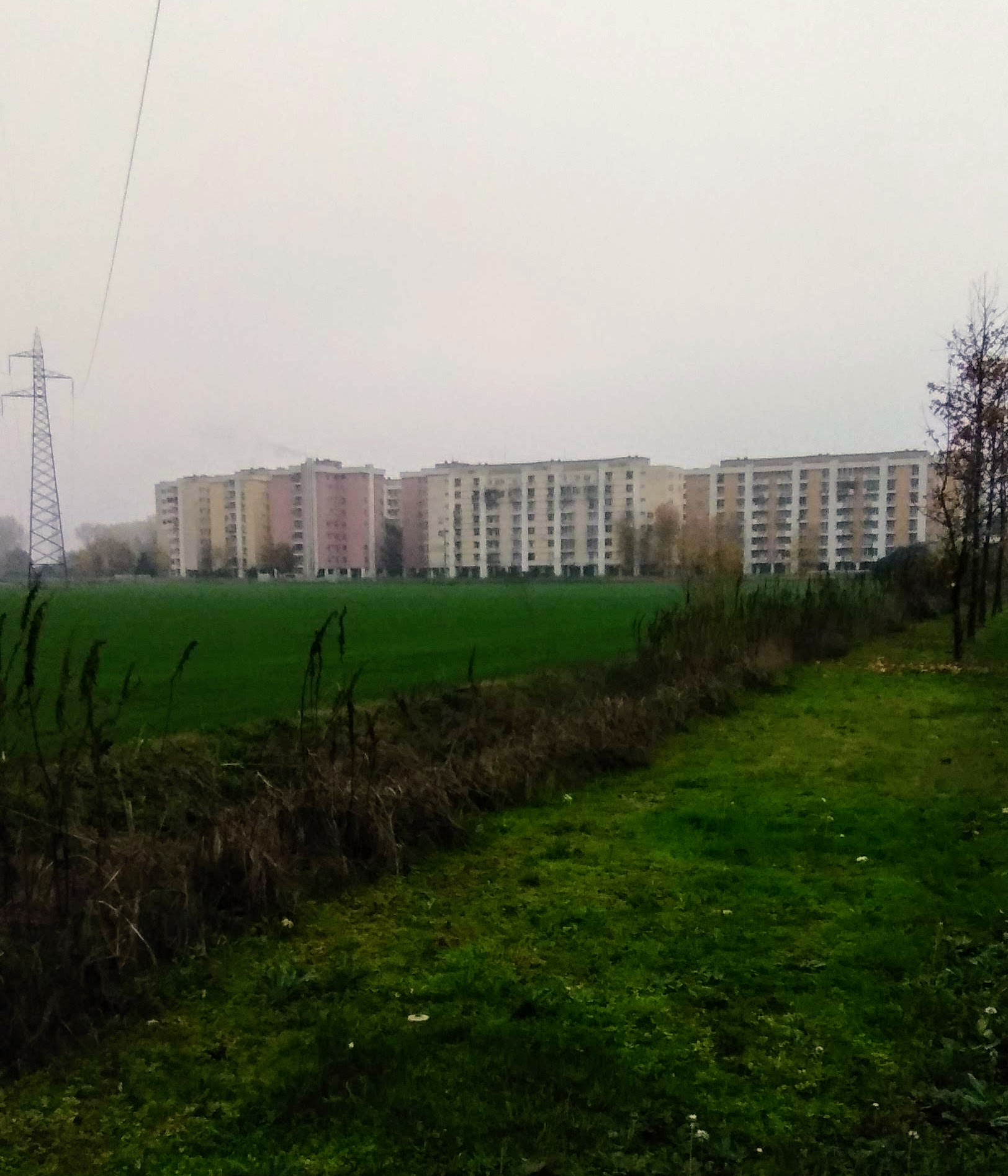
Quintasole, Milan

Quintosole is a district ("quartiere") of Milan, Italy, part of the Zone 5 administrative division. It is a rural district, located within the Parco Agricolo Sud Milano nature reserve, south of Milan's urban area. Before 1869, it was an autonomous comune.

== History ==
The oldest known reference to Quintosole dates back to 1346. When the Milanese territory was partitioned into pievi, Quintosole was included in the pieve of San Donato Milanese.

In the 17th century Quintosole had a population of about 200. In 1757, the nearby comune of Salvanesco was annexed to Quintosole.

Under Napoleonic rule, Quintosole was briefly annexed to Milan, but regained its autonomy when the Kingdom of Lombardy–Venetia was founded.

At the unification of Italy in 1861 its population was 928. Eight years later, Quintosole was annexed to Vigentino, which in turn became part of Milan in 1923.
