= Vaiano Valle =

Coordinates: 45°25′46″N 9°12′57″E

- Quartier of Milan
- Interactive map of Vaiano Valle
- Country: Italy
- Region: Lombardy
- Province: Milan
- Comune: Milan
- Zone: 5
- Time zone: UTC+1 (CET)
  - Summer (DST): UTC+2 (CEST)

Vaiano Valle is a rural district ("quartiere") of Milan, Italy, part of the Zone 5 administrative division. It is located south of the city's urban area, within the Parco Agricolo Sud Milano nature reserve. Before 1869, it was an autonomous comune.

Once a rural town, Vaiano Valle depopulated in the 20th century, and it is now one of the most degraded rural areas within Milan. Romani nomads have settled in several slums in the area, and have often had frictions with the local population as well as the city authorities. The district is also plagued with environmental problems, such as ubiquitous, illegal rubbish dumps, and high crime rates.

== History ==
The oldest known reference to Vaiano Valle (then "Vajano") dates back to 1346. When the Milanese was partitioned into pieves, Vajano was included in the pieve of San Donato Milanese.

Under Napoleonic rule, Vajano was briefly annexed to Milan, but regained its autonomy with the Kingdom of Lombardy–Venetia. In 1859 its name was changed to "Vaiano" and then to "Vaiano Valle" in 1862. In the 1860s, Vaiano Valle had a population of about 260; this small community lived on agriculture and farming (producing wheat, maize, rice, mulberries, milk, and cheese). In 1869 it was annexed to the nearby comune of Vigentino, which in turn became part of Milan in 1923.
