= Mirasole Abbey =

Church building in Opera, Italy

Coordinates: 45.3875°N 9.2027°E

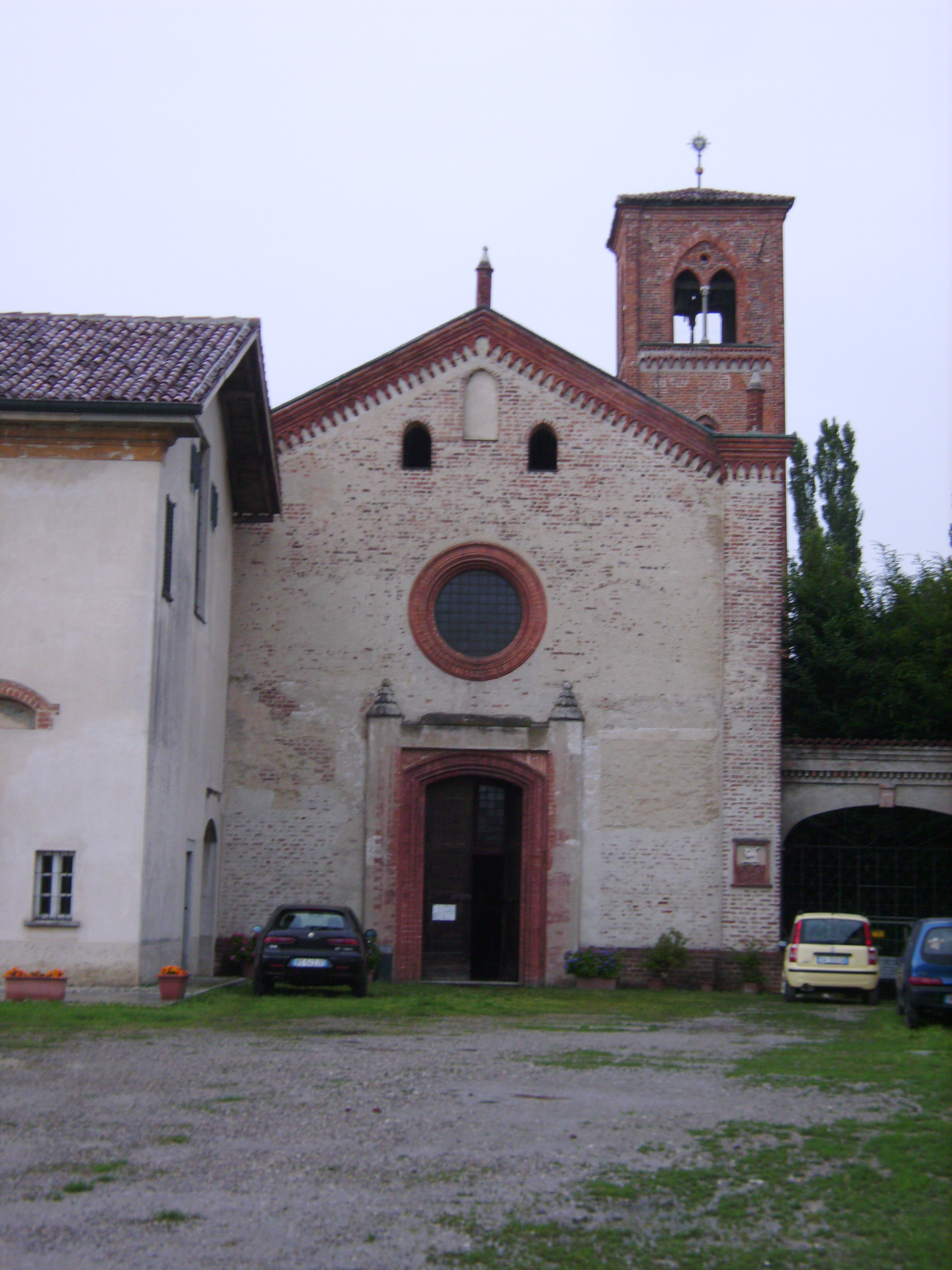
Mirasole Abbey church

Mirasole Abbey (Italian: Abbazia di Mirasole) is a monastery in the comune of Opera near Milan, Lombardy, Northern Italy. The monastery was initially founded by the Humiliati in the 13th century. The buildings have had diverse uses over the centuries. Since 2013, houses a community of the Premonstratensians.

== History ==
The abbey was founded as a monastery of the Humiliati in the first half of the 13th century. Its economy was based on the working of wool and the production of woollen cloth.

The Humiliati were suppressed in 1571, and the abbey became the property of the Collegio Elvetico in Milan, which was taken over for the use of the Austrian administration in 1786. The building is now the Palazzo del Senato); its spiritual life was administered by the Olivetans. In 1797, the former abbey was given to the Ospedale Maggiore of Milan.

In 2013 a community of Premonstratensian canons moved into the former abbey premises as the Priorato San Norberto, a priory of Mondaye Abbey in France.

== Buildings ==
The rectangular layout includes a church and cloisters. The buildings were once surrounded by a moat, towers and a drawbridge. One entrance led towards the country, the other into the city. The church, dedicated to the Virgin Mary, was constructed in the 14th and 15th centuries. It contains a fresco of the Assumption of the Virgin by an anonymous master of 1460, linked to the school of Michelino da Besozzo.
