= Porta Vigentina =

Coordinates: 45°27′07″N 9°11′47″E

- Quartier of Milan
- Interactive map of Porta Vigentina
- Country: Italy
- Region: Lombardy
- Province: Milan
- Comune: Milan
- Zone: 5
- Time zone: UTC+1 (CET)
  - Summer (DST): UTC+2 (CEST)

Porta Vigentina was one of the city gates in the Spanish walls of Milan, Italy; the gate has since been demolished, but the phrase "Porta Vigentina" is still used to refer to the district ("quartiere") where the gate used to be. The area is part of the Zone 5 administrative division of Milan.

The gate controlled access to Milan, via the "Strada Vigentina" road, connecting the city to Pavia. The road was named after the town of Vigentino (now part of Milan), located some 20 miles from Pavia.
