= Anna Maria Bernasconi =

Italian politician

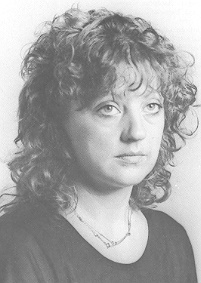

Member of the Senate
- In office 29 April 1996 – 30 May 2001

Member of the Chamber of Deputies
- In office 23 June 1987 – 22 April 1992

Personal details
- Born: 4 January 1945 (age 81) Monza, Italy
- Party: Italian Communist Party; Democratic Party of the Left
- Education: University of Milan

Anna Maria Bernasconi (born 4 January 1945) is a former Italian politician. She was a member of the Chamber of Deputies from 1987 to 1992, as a representative for the Italian Communist Party and the Democratic Party of the Left, and a member of the Senate of the Republic between 1996 and 2001.

== Early life ==
Bernasconi was born on 4 January 1945 in Monza. Her parents are Onorato Bernasconi and Albertina Bernasconi (née Rossi). She received a degree in medicine and surgery from the University of Milan. She worked as a medical assistant at the San Gerardo Hospital in Rome from 1987 and she was a member of the local health authority in 1964. She is a member of the Italian General Confederation of Labour trade union.

== Political career ==
Bernasconi was a councilor for Milan and a deputy of the Communist Parliamentary Group in 1976. She was first elected to the Chamber of Deputies in the 1987 general election as a member of the Italian Communist Party. She was a member on the commission for social affairs. Following the dissolution of the party at the svolta della Bolognina, she joined the Democratic Party of the Left (PDS).

In the 1996 general election, she was elected to the Senate of the Republic as a representative for the PDS. She was a member of the 12th standing committee on hygiene and health, the special commission on childhood, the parliamentary committee on children and the parliamentary inquiry commission on the healthcare system. She was the first signatory of Senate Bill 982 in relation to the removal of organs and tissues from corpses for therapeutic transplantation and of Senate Bill 4983 in relation to the consent of minors to health treatments.

She contested the single-member constituency of Monza in the 2001 general election as the nominee for The Olive Tree party, but she was not elected.
