= Luigi Moretti (politician) =

Italian politician (Lega Nord)

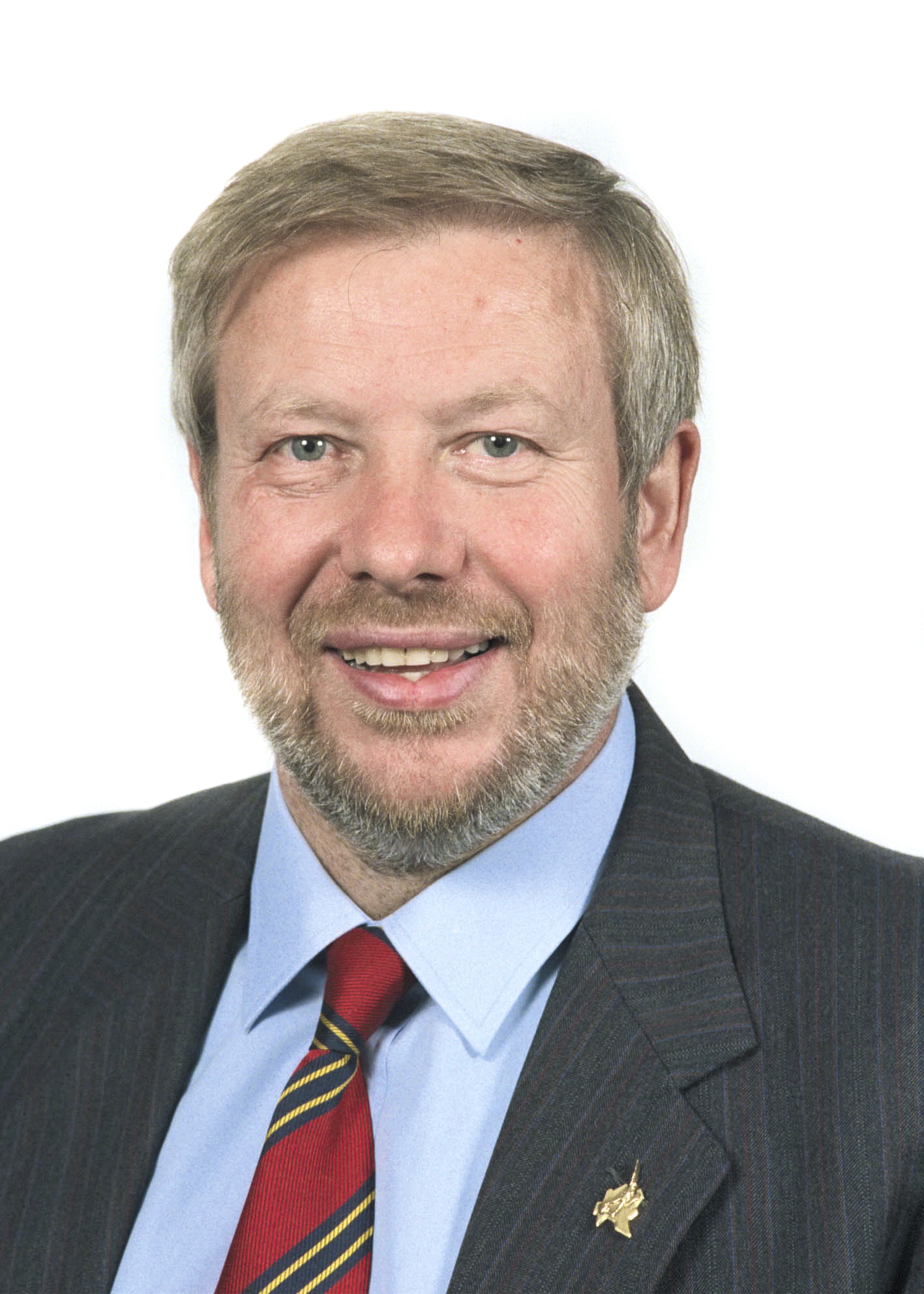

Luigi Moretti (6 June 1944) is an Italian politician, exponent of the Lombard League and the Northern League and formerly a European Parliamentarian.

== Biography ==
Luigi Moretti was elected European deputy in the 1989 elections, then reconfirmed in 1994, for the Northern League lists. He was vice-president of the Delegation for relations with Czechoslovakia, of the Delegation for relations with the Czech Republic and the Slovakia Republic and of the Delegation for relations with Canada. Vice-President of the Group of the European Liberals, Democrats and Reformers. In the local area, he held the position of mayor of his country, Nembro, for two terms, from 1994 to 2002.
