= Livio Caputo =

Italian politician (1933–2021)

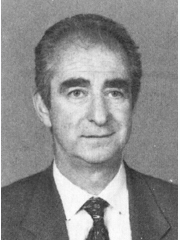
Livio Caputo

Livio Caputo (24 August 1933 – 14 June 2021) was an Italian politician and journalist who served as a Senator.
