= Gianpaolo Silvestri =

Italian politician (1954–2024)

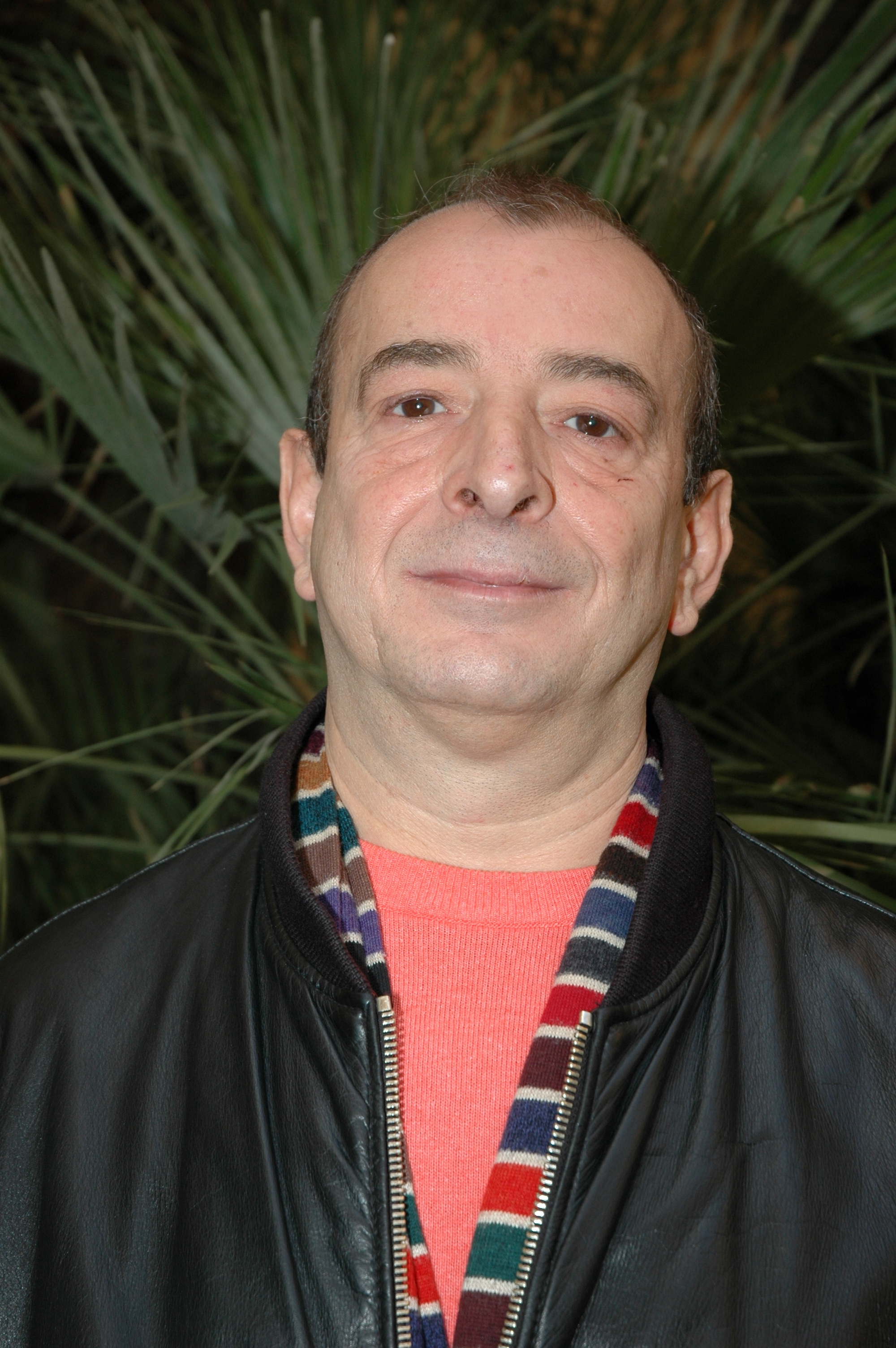
- Silvestri in 2006

Member of the Senate of the Republic of Italy for Lombardy
- In office 28 April 2006 – 28 April 2008

Personal details
- Born: 16 February 1954 Villanuova sul Clisi, Italy
- Died: 1 November 2024 (aged 70)
- Party: FdV
- Occupation: Journalist

Gianpaolo Silvestri (16 February 1954 – 1 November 2024) was an Italian journalist and politician. A member of the Federation of the Greens, he served in the Senate of the Republic from 2006 to 2008.

Silvestri died on 1 November 2024, at the age of 70.
