= 1992 Italian general election =

- 5–6 April 1992

All 630 seats in the Chamber of Deputies · 315 seats in the Senate
- Registered: 47,486,964 (C) · 41,053,543 (S)
- Turnout: 41,479,764 (C) · 87.4% (▼1.4 pp); 35,633,367 (S) · 86.8% (▼1.5 pp)
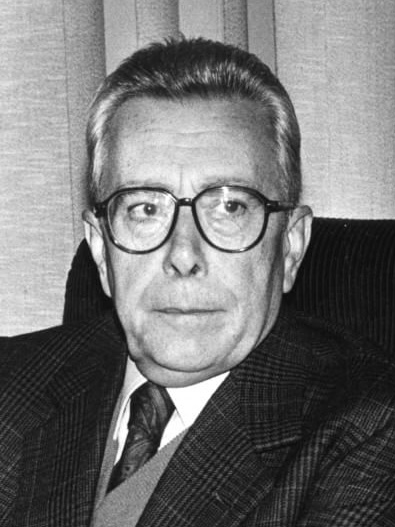

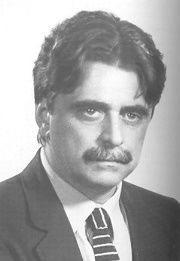

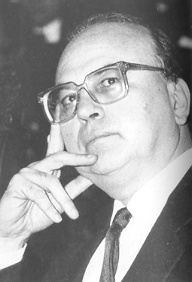

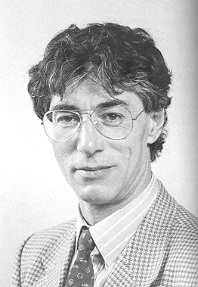

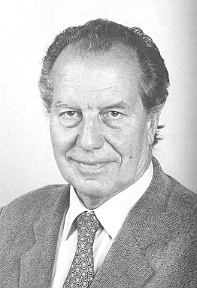

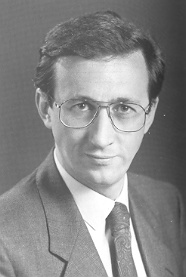
| | First party | Second party | Third party |
|---|---|---|---|
| Leader | Arnaldo Forlani | Achille Occhetto | Bettino Craxi |
| Party | DC | PDS | PSI |
| Leader since | 22 February 1989 (Note: Forlani also served as secretary from 1969 to 1973.) | 21 June 1988 (Note: Occhetto served as secretary of the PCI from 1988 to 1991. In 1991, he was appointed secretary of PCI's heir, the PDS.) | 15 July 1976 |
| Leader's seat | Ancona (C) | Rome (C) | Milan (C) |
| Seats won | 206 (C) / 107 (S) | 107 (C) / 66 (S) | 92 (C) / 49 (S) |
| Seat change | ▼46 (C) / ▼18 (S) | ▼51 (C) / ▼45 (S) | ▼2 (C) / ▲5 (S) |
| Popular vote | 11,637,569 (C); 9,088,494 (S) | 6,317,962 (C); 5,682,888 (S) | 5,343,808 (C); 4,523,873 (S) |
| Percentage | 29.7% (C); 27.3% (S) | 16.1% (C); 17.0% (S) | 13.6% (C); 13.6% (S) |
| Swing | ▼4.6 pp (C) ▼5.3 pp (S) | ▼10.5 pp (C) ▼11.3 pp (S) | ▼0.7 pp (C) ▲2.6 pp (S) |
| | Fourth party | Fifth party | Sixth party |
| Leader | Umberto Bossi | Sergio Garavini | Gianfranco Fini |
| Party | LN | PRC | MSI |
| Leader since | 4 December 1989 | 10 February 1991 | 6 July 1991 (Note: Fini also served as secretary from 1987 to 1990.) |
| Leader's seat | Milan (C) | Rome (C) | Rome (C) |
| Seats won | 55 (C) / 25 (S) | 35 (C) / 20 (S) | 34 (C) / 16 (S) |
| Seat change | ▲54 (C) / ▲24 (S) | New party | ▼1 (C) / 0 (S) |
| Popular vote | 3,396,012 (C); 2,732,461 (S) | 2,204,641 (C); 2,171,950 (S) | 2,107,037 (C); 2,171,215 (S) |
| Percentage | 8.7% (C); 8.2% (S) | 5.6% (C); 6.5% (S) | 5.4% (C); 6.5% (S) |
| Swing | ▲8.2 pp (C) ▲7.8 pp (S) | New party | ▼0.4 pp (C); 0.0 pp (S) |
Prime Minister before election
Giulio Andreotti
DC
Prime Minister after the election
Giuliano Amato
PSI

General elections were held in Italy on 5 and 6 April 1992. They were the first without the traditionally second most important political force in Italian politics, the Italian Communist Party (PCI), which had been disbanded in 1991. Most of its members split between the more democratic socialist-oriented Democratic Party of the Left (PDS), while a minority who did not want to renounce the communist tradition became the Communist Refoundation Party (PRC); between them, they gained around 4% less than what the already declining PCI had obtained in the 1987 Italian general election, despite PRC absorbing the disbanded Proletarian Democracy (DP).

The other major feature was the sudden rise of the Northern League (LN), a federalist party that increased its vote from 0.5% of the preceding elections to more than 8%, increasing from a single member both in the Chamber and the Senate to 55 and 25, respectively. The "long wave" (onda lunga) of Bettino Craxi's now centrist-oriented Italian Socialist Party (PSI), which in the past elections had been forecast next to overcome PCI, seemed to stop. Christian Democracy (DC) and the other traditional government parties, with the exception of the Italian Republican Party (PRI) and the Italian Liberal Party (PLI), also experienced a slight decrease in their vote.

== Electoral system ==
The pure party-list proportional representation had traditionally become the electoral system for the Chamber of Deputies. Italian provinces were united in 32 constituencies, each electing a group of candidates. At constituency level, seats were divided between open lists using the largest remainder method with Imperiali quota. The remaining votes and seats were transferred at national level, where they were divided using the Hare quota, and automatically distributed to best losers into the local lists.

For the Senate, 237 single-seat constituencies were established, even if the assembly had risen to 315 members. The candidates needed a landslide victory of two thirds of votes to be elected, a goal which could be reached only by the German minorities in South Tirol. All remained votes and seats were grouped in party lists and regional constituencies, where a D'Hondt method was used: inside the lists, candidates with the best percentages were elected.

== Background ==
In February 1991, the Italian Communist Party (PCI) split into the Democratic Party of the Left (PDS), led by Achille Occhetto, and the Communist Refoundation Party (PRC), headed by Armando Cossutta. Occhetto, leader of the PCI since 1988, stunned the party faithfully assembled in a working-class section of Bologna with a speech heralding the end of Communism, a move now referred to in Italian politics as the svolta della Bolognina (Bolognina turning point). The collapse of the Communist governments in the Soviet Union and Eastern Europe had convinced Occhetto that the era of Eurocommunism was over, and he transformed the PCI into a progressive left-wing party, the PDS. A third of the PCI's former members, led by Cossutta, refused to join the PDS, and founded the Communist Refoundation Party.

The coalition ended in 1991 when the Italian Republican Party (PRI) withdrew its support from the coalition over its failure to be given the Ministry of Communications. On 29 March 1991, the 5-party Andreotti VI Cabinet was replaced with the 4-party (quadripartito) Andreotti VII cabinet.

On 17 February 1992, judge Antonio Di Pietro had Mario Chiesa, a member of the Italian Socialist Party (PSI), arrested for accepting a bribe from a Milan cleaning firm. The Socialists distanced themselves from Chiesa. Bettino Craxi called Chiesa mariuolo, or "villain", a "wild splinter" of the otherwise clean PSI. Upset over this treatment by his former colleagues, Chiesa began to give information about corruption implicating his colleagues. This marked the beginning of the Mani pulite investigation; news of political corruption began spreading in the press.

In February 1991, the Northern League, which was first launched as an upgrade of the Northern Alliance in December 1989, was officially transformed into a party through the merger of various regional parties, notably including Lombard League and Venetian League, under the leadership of Umberto Bossi. These continue to exist as "national" sections of the federal party.

The Northern League exploited resentment against Rome's centralism (with the famous slogan Roma ladrona, which loosely means "Rome big thief") and the Italian government, common in northern Italy, as many northerners felt that the government wasted resources collected mostly from northerners' taxes. Cultural influences from bordering countries in the North and resentment against illegal immigrants were also exploited. The party's electoral successes began roughly at a time when public disillusionment with the established political parties was at its height. The Tangentopoli corruption scandals, which invested most of the established parties, were unveiled from 1992 on. Contrarily to what many pundits observed at the beginning of the 1990s, the Northern League became a stable political force and it is by far the oldest party among those represented in the Italian Parliament.

The Northern League's first electoral breakthrough was at the 1990 regional elections, but it was with the 1992 general election that the party emerged as a leading political actor. Having gained 8.7% of the vote, 56 deputies, and 26 senators, it became the fourth largest party of the country and within the Italian Parliament.

== Parties and leaders ==
| Party | Ideology | Leader | Seats in 1987 | | | Seats in 1992 | | |
| Party | Ideology | Leader | C | S | Total | C | S | Total |
|---|---|---|---|---|---|---|---|---|
| Christian Democracy (DC) | Christian democracy | Arnaldo Forlani | 234 | 125 | 359 | 234 | 129 | 363 |
| Democratic Party of the Left (PDS) | Democratic socialism | Achille Occhetto | 177 (PCI) | 102 (PCI) | 279 (PCI) | 168 (PDS+SI) | 89 (PDS+SI) | 257 (PDS+SI) |
| Italian Socialist Party (PSI) | Social democracy | Bettino Craxi | 94 | 45 | 139 | 100 | 45 | 145 |
| Italian Social Movement (MSI) | Neo-fascism | Gianfranco Fini | 35 | 16 | 51 | 33 | 15 | 48 |
| Italian Republican Party (PRI) | Liberalism | Giorgio La Malfa | 21 | 8 | 29 | 20 | 9 | 29 |
| Communist Refoundation Party (PRC) | Communism | Sergio Garavini | Dit not exist | | | 11 | 11 | 22 |
| Italian Democratic Socialist Party (PSDI) | Social democracy | Franco Nicolazzi | 17 | 7 | 24 | 12 | 5 | 17 |
| Federation of the Greens (FdV) | Green politics | Gianni Francesco Mattioli | 13 | 2 | 15 | 13 | 2 | 15 |
| Italian Liberal Party (PLI) | Liberalism | Renato Altissimo | 11 | 3 | 14 | 11 | 3 | 14 |
| Pannella List (LP) | Libertarianism | Marco Pannella | 12 (PR) | 3 (PR) | 15 (PR) | 8 | 3 | 11 |
| Northern League (LN) | Regionalism | Umberto Bossi | 1 | 1 | 2 | 1 | 1 | 2 |
| The Network (LR) | Anti-corruption | Leoluca Orlando | Did not exist | | | 0 | 0 | 0 |

== Results ==
Christian Democracy (DC) suffered a significant swing against it, but the coalition it had led prior to the elections managed to retain a small majority. Opposition parties won a significant amount of support; however, the largest opposition party, the Italian Communist Party (PCI), had suffered an internal crisis after the fall of the Soviet Union, with the bulk of the party reforming into the Democratic Party of the Left (PDS) and a minority forming the Communist Refoundation Party (PRC). Collectively, they suffered a 4% swing against them, with the PDS losing a third of its seats compared to 1987, and the opposition was divided. The biggest winner of the election was Northern League, which was not inclined to alliances at the time due to its separatist leanings.

The resulting parliament was therefore weak and difficult to bring to an agreement, and lasted only two years before new elections were held in 1994. This was accelerated by the mani pulite scandal, which began shortly before the election and expanded in scope throughout 1992 and 1993. The scandal implicated vast sections of almost every major political party in Italy in extensive corruption. This had catastrophic consequences for the political landscape as the governing parties became extremely unpopular.

The 1992–1994 parliamentary term also saw the first major change to the Italian electoral system since the late 1940s, with a 1993 referendum abolishing the clause of the electoral law which required candidates to win two-thirds of votes to be elected in the Senate's single-member districts. This essentially transformed the Senate electoral law from de facto pure proportional representation to a mixed-member majoritarian system. Parliament subsequently passed a new electoral law establishing a similar system for the Chamber of Deputies.

=== Chamber of Deputies ===
| Party | Votes | % | Seats | +/– |
|---|---|---|---|---|
| Christian Democracy | 11,637,569 | 29.65 | 206 | −28 |
| Democratic Party of the Left | 6,317,962 | 16.10 | 107 | −70 |
| Italian Socialist Party | 5,343,808 | 13.62 | 92 | −2 |
| Northern League | 3,395,384 | 8.65 | 55 | +54 |
| Communist Refoundation Party | 2,201,428 | 5.61 | 35 | New |
| Italian Social Movement | 2,107,272 | 5.37 | 34 | −1 |
| Italian Republican Party | 1,723,756 | 4.39 | 27 | +6 |
| Italian Liberal Party | 1,121,854 | 2.86 | 17 | +6 |
| Federation of the Greens | 1,093,037 | 2.79 | 16 | +3 |
| Italian Democratic Socialist Party | 1,066,672 | 2.72 | 16 | −1 |
| The Network | 730,293 | 1.86 | 12 | New |
| Pannella List | 486,344 | 1.24 | 7 | −6 |
| Yes Referendum | 320,061 | 0.82 | 0 | New |
| Pensioners' Party | 220,509 | 0.56 | 0 | New |
| South Tyrolean People's Party | 198,431 | 0.51 | 3 | 0 |
| Hunting – Fishing – Environment | 193,228 | 0.49 | 0 | 0 |
| Federalism–Pensioners Living Men (UV–PSd'Az–SSK–UfS) | 154,987 | 0.39 | 1 | –1 |
| Lega Autonomia Veneta | 152,396 | 0.39 | 1 | New |
| Housewives–Pensioners League | 134,093 | 0.34 | 0 | New |
| Lega Alpina Lumbarda | 90,875 | 0.23 | 0 | New |
| Lega Alpina Piemont | 69,648 | 0.18 | 0 | New |
| Southern Action League | 53,993 | 0.14 | 0 | New |
| Veneto Autonomous Region Movement | 49,027 | 0.12 | 0 | 0 |
| Venice Union | 48,659 | 0.12 | 0 | New |
| Federalist Greens | 42,884 | 0.11 | 0 | New |
| Aosta Valley | 41,404 | 0.11 | 1 | 0 |
| Lega Lombardia Europea Terra Libera | 33,579 | 0.09 | 0 | New |
| Dolchi-Fosson Group (DC–PDS) | 30,724 | 0.08 | 0 | New |
| League of Leagues | 28,008 | 0.07 | 0 | New |
| Greens Greens | 25,862 | 0.07 | 0 | New |
| Love Party | 22,401 | 0.06 | 0 | New |
| Independentist Sardinian Party | 15,106 | 0.04 | 0 | New |
| Alleanza Lombarda | 15,054 | 0.04 | 0 | New |
| Piemont Liber | 11,263 | 0.03 | 0 | New |
| Political Movement for the Defence of Motorists | 10,109 | 0.03 | 0 | New |
| Lega Marche | 8,035 | 0.02 | 0 | New |
| Lega Lazio | 5,999 | 0.02 | 0 | New |
| Lega Padana Emilia-Romagna | 5,832 | 0.01 | 0 | New |
| Territorial Development Cooperation | 5,722 | 0.01 | 0 | New |
| Christian Democracy Party | 5,046 | 0.01 | 0 | New |
| Tuscan Autonomist Movement | 4,422 | 0.01 | 0 | New |
| Southern League of Italy | 4,054 | 0.01 | 0 | New |
| Europa 2000 Party | 3,380 | 0.01 | 0 | New |
| Living Together | 2,848 | 0.01 | 0 | New |
| Justicialist Party | 2,818 | 0.01 | 0 | New |
| Freedom Movement | 2,418 | 0.01 | 0 | New |
| European Motorists' Movement | 2,108 | 0.01 | 0 | New |
| National Protest League | 1,472 | 0.00 | 0 | New |
| Renewal | 1,208 | 0.00 | 0 | New |
| Southern League for National Unity | 464 | 0.00 | 0 | New |
| Total | 39,243,506 | 100.00 | 630 | 0 |
| Valid votes | 39,243,506 | 94.70 | | |
| Invalid/blank votes | 2,195,438 | 5.30 | | |
| Total votes | 41,438,944 | 100.00 | | |
| Registered voters/turnout | 47,435,689 | 87.36 | | |
Source: JSTOR 45132579 Romano, Brocchini

Popular vote
| DC | 29.66% |
| PDS | 16.11% |
| PSI | 13.62% |
| LN | 8.65% |
| PRC | 5.62% |
| MSI | 5.37% |
| PRI | 4.39% |
| PLI | 2.86% |
| FdV | 2.79% |
| PSDI | 2.71% |
| Rete | 1.86% |
| LP | 1.24% |
| Others | 5.14% |

Seats
| DC | 32.70% |
| PDS | 16.98% |
| PSI | 14.60% |
| LN | 8.73% |
| PRC | 5.56% |
| MSI | 5.40% |
| PRI | 4.29% |
| PLI | 2.70% |
| FdV | 2.54% |
| PSDI | 2.54% |
| Rete | 1.90% |
| LP | 1.11% |
| Others | 0.95% |

==== Results by constituency ====
| Constituency | Total seats | Seats won | | | | | | | | | | |
| Constituency | Total seats | DC | PDS | PSI | LN | PRC | MSI | PRI | PLI | FdV | PSDI | Others |
|---|---|---|---|---|---|---|---|---|---|---|---|---|
| Turin | 35 | 7 | 5 | 5 | 6 | 3 | 2 | 2 | 1 | 1 | 1 | 2 |
| Cuneo | 12 | 4 | 1 | 2 | 3 | 1 | | | 1 | | | |
| Genoa | 19 | 5 | 4 | 2 | 3 | 1 | 1 | 1 | 1 | 1 | | |
| Milan | 48 | 10 | 7 | 7 | 10 | 3 | 2 | 3 | 1 | 2 | 1 | 2 |
| Como | 19 | 5 | 2 | 3 | 6 | 1 | 1 | | | 1 | | |
| Brescia | 21 | 7 | 2 | 2 | 6 | 1 | 1 | 1 | | 1 | | |
| Mantua | 9 | 3 | 2 | 1 | 2 | 1 | | | | | | |
| Trentino | 10 | 3 | | 1 | 1 | | | | | 1 | | 4 |
| Verona | 28 | 10 | 3 | 3 | 5 | 1 | 1 | 1 | 1 | 1 | | 2 |
| Venice | 15 | 5 | 2 | 2 | 3 | 1 | | 1 | | 1 | | |
| Udine | 12 | 4 | 1 | 2 | 3 | | 1 | | | | 1 | |
| Bologna | 27 | 5 | 9 | 3 | 2 | 2 | 1 | 2 | 1 | 1 | | 1 |
| Parma | 18 | 4 | 6 | 2 | 3 | 1 | 1 | 1 | | | | |
| Florence | 17 | 4 | 6 | 2 | 1 | 2 | 1 | 1 | | | | |
| Pisa | 16 | 4 | 4 | 2 | 1 | 1 | 1 | 1 | 1 | 1 | | |
| Siena | 7 | 2 | 3 | 1 | | 1 | | | | | | |
| Ancona | 16 | 6 | 4 | 2 | | 1 | 1 | 1 | | 1 | | |
| Perugia | 11 | 3 | 4 | 2 | | 1 | 1 | | | | | |
| Rome | 54 | 17 | 10 | 7 | | 3 | 5 | 3 | 2 | 2 | 2 | 3 |
| L'Aquila | 16 | 6 | 3 | 2 | | 1 | 1 | | 1 | | 1 | 1 |
| Campobasso | 5 | 3 | 1 | 1 | | | | | | | | |
| Naples | 44 | 18 | 6 | 8 | | 2 | 3 | 1 | 2 | 1 | 1 | 2 |
| Benevento | 19 | 9 | 2 | 5 | | | 1 | 1 | | | 1 | |
| Bari | 25 | 10 | 3 | 5 | | 1 | 2 | 1 | 1 | 1 | 1 | |
| Lecce | 18 | 7 | 3 | 3 | | 1 | 2 | 1 | | | 1 | |
| Potenza | 6 | 4 | 1 | 1 | | | | | | | | |
| Catanzaro | 24 | 9 | 4 | 4 | | 2 | 1 | 1 | 1 | | 2 | |
| Catania | 29 | 12 | 3 | 5 | | 1 | 2 | 2 | 1 | | 1 | 2 |
| Palermo | 27 | 12 | 2 | 3 | | 1 | 1 | 1 | 1 | | 2 | 4 |
| Cagliari | 19 | 7 | 3 | 3 | | 1 | 1 | 1 | 1 | | 1 | 1 |
| Aosta Valley | 1 | | | | | | | | | | | 1 |
| Trieste | 3 | 1 | 1 | 1 | | | | | | | | |
| Total | 630 | 206 | 107 | 92 | 55 | 35 | 34 | 27 | 17 | 16 | 16 | 25 |

=== Senate of the Republic ===
| Party | Votes | % | Seats | +/– |
|---|---|---|---|---|
| Christian Democracy | 9,088,494 | 27.27 | 107 | −18 |
| Democratic Party of the Left | 5,682,888 | 17.05 | 64 | −37 |
| Italian Socialist Party | 4,523,873 | 13.57 | 49 | +13 |
| Northern League | 2,732,461 | 8.20 | 25 | +24 |
| Communist Refoundation Party | 2,171,950 | 6.52 | 20 | New |
| Italian Social Movement | 2,171,215 | 6.51 | 16 | 0 |
| Italian Republican Party | 1,565,142 | 4.70 | 10 | +2 |
| Federation of the Greens | 1,027,303 | 3.08 | 4 | +3 |
| Italian Liberal Party | 939,159 | 2.82 | 4 | +1 |
| Italian Democratic Socialist Party | 853,895 | 2.56 | 3 | −2 |
| Yes Referendum | 332,318 | 1.00 | 0 | New |
| The Network | 239,868 | 0.72 | 3 | New |
| Pensioners' Party | 215,889 | 0.65 | 0 | New |
| Lega Alpina Lumbarda | 192,450 | 0.58 | 1 | New |
| Federalism–Pensioners Living Men (UV–PSd'Az–SSK–UfS) | 174,713 | 0.52 | 1 | 0 |
| South Tyrolean People's Party | 168,113 | 0.50 | 3 | +1 |
| Pannella List | 166,708 | 0.50 | 0 | −3 |
| For Calabria | 143,976 | 0.43 | 2 | New |
| Lega Autonomia Veneta | 142,446 | 0.43 | 1 | New |
| Housewives-Pensioners League | 134,327 | 0.40 | 0 | New |
| Hunting – Fishing – Environment | 116,395 | 0.35 | 0 | 0 |
| Lega Lombardia Europea Terra Libera | 52,366 | 0.16 | 0 | New |
| Veneto Autonomous Region Movement | 50,938 | 0.15 | 0 | New |
| Southern Action League | 49,769 | 0.15 | 0 | New |
| For Molise | 48,352 | 0.15 | 1 | New |
| Federalist Greens | 47,051 | 0.14 | 0 | New |
| Venice Union | 42,967 | 0.13 | 0 | New |
| Without Borders | 36,115 | 0.11 | 0 | New |
| Aosta Valley | 34,150 | 0.10 | 1 | 0 |
| Alleanza Lombarda | 32,748 | 0.10 | 0 | New |
| Dolchi-Fosson Group (DC–PDS) | 31,175 | 0.09 | 0 | New |
| Greens Greens | 29,217 | 0.09 | 0 | New |
| League of Leagues | 24,051 | 0.07 | 0 | New |
| Love Party | 16,875 | 0.05 | 0 | New |
| Independentist Sardinian Party | 13,426 | 0.04 | 0 | New |
| Lega Marche | 7,578 | 0.02 | 0 | New |
| Lega Lazio | 7,445 | 0.02 | 0 | New |
| Freedom Movement | 6,793 | 0.02 | 0 | New |
| Tuscan Autonomist Movement | 6,546 | 0.02 | 0 | New |
| European Motorists' Movement | 3,678 | 0.01 | 0 | New |
| Political Movement for the Defence of Motorists | 3,266 | 0.01 | 0 | New |
| Southern League for National Unity | 492 | 0.00 | 0 | New |
| Total | 33,328,581 | 100.00 | 315 | 0 |
| Valid votes | 33,328,581 | 93.53 | | |
| Invalid/blank votes | 2,304,786 | 6.47 | | |
| Total votes | 35,633,367 | 100.00 | | |
| Registered voters/turnout | 41,053,543 | 86.80 | | |
Source: Ministry of the Interior, Brocchini

Popular vote
| DC | 27.27% |
| PDS | 17.05% |
| PSI | 13.57% |
| LN | 8.20% |
| PRC | 6.52% |
| MSI | 6.51% |
| PRI | 4.70% |
| FdV | 3.08% |
| PLI | 2.82% |
| PSDI | 2.56% |
| Others | 7.72% |

Seats
| DC | 33.97% |
| PDS | 20.32% |
| PSI | 15.56% |
| LN | 7.94% |
| PRC | 6.35% |
| MSI | 5.08% |
| PRI | 3.17% |
| FdV | 1.27% |
| PLI | 1.27% |
| PSDI | 0.95% |
| Others | 4.13% |

==== Results by constituency ====
| Constituency | Total seats | Seats won | | | | | | | | | | |
| Constituency | Total seats | DC | PDS | PSI | LN | PRC | MSI | PRI | FdV | PLI | PSDI | Others |
|---|---|---|---|---|---|---|---|---|---|---|---|---|
| Piedmont | 24 | 6 | 4 | 4 | 4 | 2 | 1 | 1 | 1 | 1 | | |
| Aosta Valley | 1 | | | | | | | | | | | 1 |
| Lombardy | 48 | 14 | 7 | 7 | 11 | 3 | 1 | 2 | 1 | 1 | | 1 |
| Trentino-Alto Adige | 7 | 2 | | 1 | 1 | | | | | | | 3 |
| Veneto | 23 | 9 | 3 | 3 | 4 | 1 | 1 | 1 | | | | 1 |
| Friuli-Venezia Giulia | 7 | 3 | 1 | 2 | 1 | | | | | | | |
| Liguria | 10 | 3 | 3 | 1 | 2 | 1 | | | | | | |
| Emilia-Romagna | 21 | 5 | 9 | 2 | 2 | 2 | | 1 | | | | |
| Tuscany | 19 | 5 | 7 | 3 | | 2 | 1 | 1 | | | | |
| Umbria | 7 | 2 | 3 | 1 | | 1 | | | | | | |
| Marche | 8 | 3 | 3 | 1 | | 1 | | | | | | |
| Lazio | 27 | 9 | 7 | 4 | | 2 | 3 | 1 | 1 | | | |
| Abruzzo | 7 | 4 | 2 | 1 | | | | | | | | |
| Molise | 2 | 1 | | | | | | | | | | 1 |
| Campania | 30 | 11 | 5 | 5 | | 2 | 3 | 1 | 1 | 1 | 1 | |
| Apulia | 21 | 7 | 4 | 4 | | 1 | 3 | 1 | | | 1 | |
| Basilicata | 7 | 4 | 1 | 2 | | | | | | | | |
| Calabria | 11 | 5 | | 2 | | 1 | 1 | | | | | 2 |
| Sicily | 26 | 10 | 3 | 4 | | 1 | 2 | 1 | | 1 | 1 | 3 |
| Sardinia | 9 | 4 | 2 | 2 | | | | | | | | 1 |
| Total | 315 | 107 | 64 | 49 | 25 | 20 | 16 | 10 | 4 | 4 | 3 | 13 |

== See also ==
- Politics of Italy
- History of the Italian Republic#Second Republic (1992–present)
