= Opera, Lombardy =

Opera Òvera (Lombard)
- Comune
- Comune di Opera
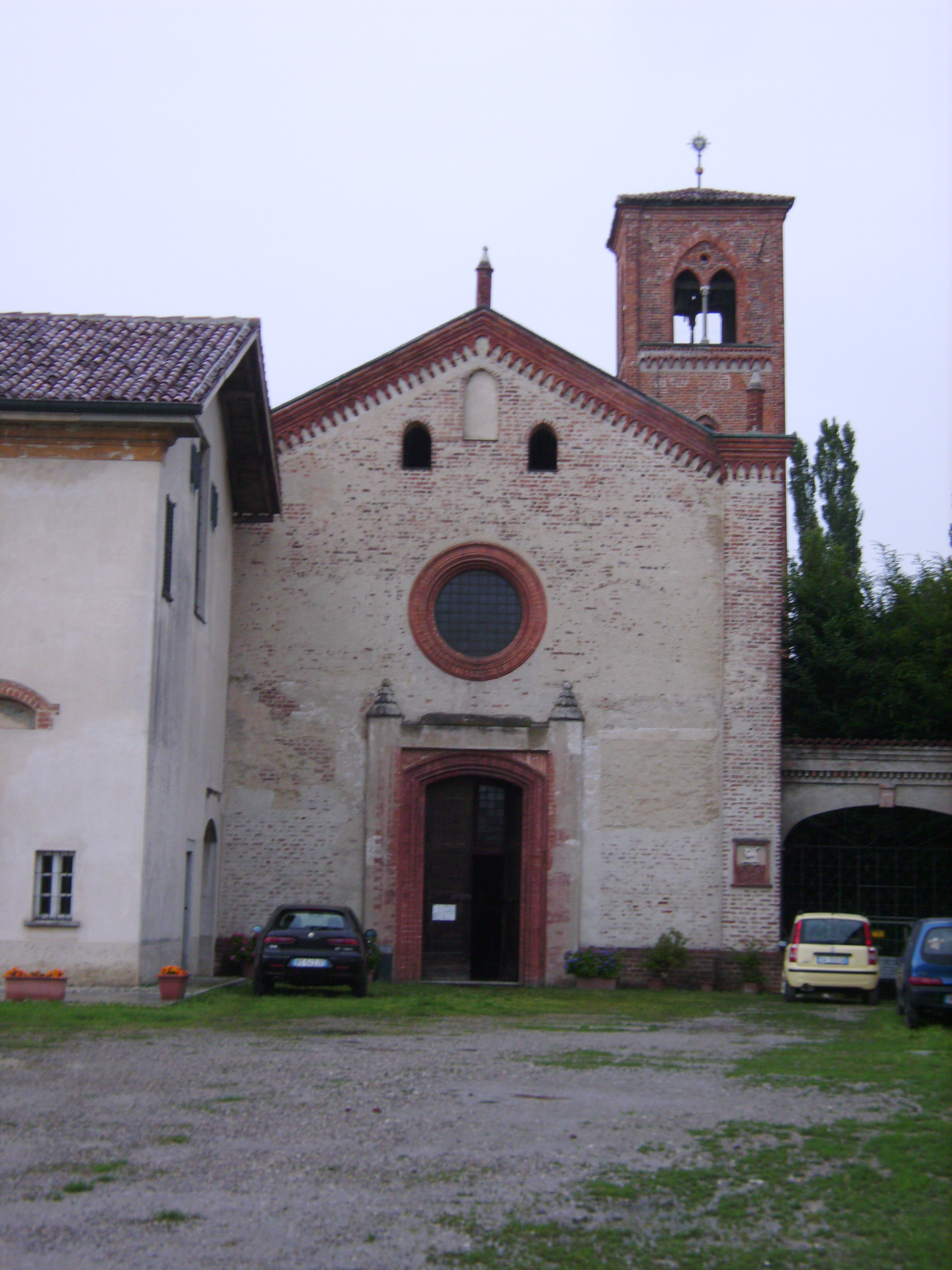
- Abbey of Mirasole.

- Coat of arms

- Location within Italy Location within Lombardy
- Coordinates: 45°23′N 9°13′E
- Country: Italy
- Region: Lombardy
- Metropolitan city: Milan (MI)
- Frazioni: Noverasco

Area
  - Total: 7.6 km^{2} (2.9 sq mi)
- Elevation: 99 m (325 ft)

Population (30 November 2014)
  - Total: 13,880
  - Density: 1,800/km^{2} (4,700/sq mi)
- Demonym: Operesi
- Time zone: UTC+1 (CET)
  - Summer (DST): UTC+2 (CEST)
- Postal code: 20073
- Dialing code: 02
- Website: Official website

Opera (Milanese: Òvera [ˈɔʋera]) is a comune (municipality) in the Metropolitan City of Milan in the Italian region Lombardy, located about 10 kilometres (6 mi) southeast of Milan.

Opera borders the following municipalities: Locate di Triulzi, Milan, Pieve Emanuele, Rozzano, San Donato Milanese. It is home to the early 13th century Abbey of Mirasole.
