= Felice Besostri =

Italian jurist and politician (1944–2024)

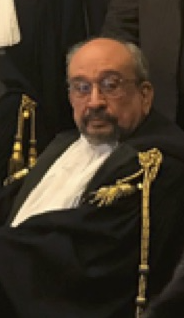
Image of Felice Besostri

Felice Carlo Besostri (23 April 1944 – 6 January 2024) was an Italian jurist and politician.

== Life and career ==
Felice Besostri was born in Zevio on 23 April 1944. He completed his legal studies at the University of Milan at the age of 25. Besostri later joined the university's political science department as a researcher.

Between 1983 and 1988, Besostri served as mayor of Borgo San Giovanni, and represented the Italian Socialist Party (PSI). After the PSI disbanded in 1994, Besostri became close to Valdo Spini, and was elected to the Senate of the Republic representing the Democrats of the Left, a member party of The Olive Tree coalition, from 1996 to 2001.

After completing his term in the Senate, Besostri became known for appealing the enforcement of the Italian electoral law of 2005, which led to its voidment on 13 January 2004. The subsequent changes in 2015 were again stricken down by his iniziative.

Besostri died in Milan on 6 January 2024, at the age of 79. At his funeral, he was remembered with Giacomo Matteotti's quotation "the man dies, not the idea".
