= Francesco Ferrari (politician, born 1905) =

Italian politician

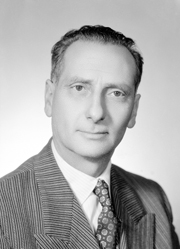
- Born: October 15, 1905; Casarano, Kingdom of Italy
- Died: August 4, 1975 (aged 69)
- Occupation: politician
- Political party: Christian Democracy

Francesco Ferrari (October 15, 1905 – August 4, 1975) was a 20th-century Italian politician. He was a member of Christian Democracy. He was a senator in the Senate of the Republic from 1953 to 1975.
