= Valerio Carrara =

Italian politician (1951–2022)

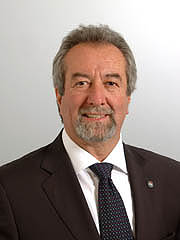
- Carrara in 2008

Member of the Senate of the Republic of Italy
- In office 30 May 2001 – 14 March 2013
- Constituency: Lombardy

Personal details
- Born: 3 March 1951 Oltre il Colle, Italy
- Died: 9 February 2022 (aged 70) Seriate, Italy
- Party: IdV (until 2001); FI (2001–2009); PdL (2009–2011)

Valerio Carrara (3 March 1951 – 9 February 2022) was an Italian politician.

In the 2001 election, he was elected to the Senate in the lists of Italy of Values, a dissident centre-left party led by Antonio di Pietro. However, soon after the election, he left Italy of Values and joined the centre-right House of Freedoms coalition, an action for which he was accused of careerism and hypocrisy.

In 2004 he formally joined Forza Italia and, later, The People of Freedom and he served in the Senate of the Republic from 2001 to 2013. In 2011, he joined the National Cohesion parliamentary group, remaining in the centre-right coalition.

He died in Seriate on 9 February 2022, at the age of 70 due to a heart attack.
