= Domenico Contestabile =

Italian lawyer and politician (1937–2022)

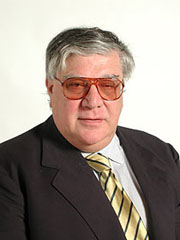

Member of the Senate of the Republic of Italy
- In office 15 April 1994 – 27 April 2006
- Constituency: Cinisello Balsamo (1994–1996); Vigevano (1996–2006)

Personal details
- Born: 11 August 1937 Teano, Italy
- Died: 28 October 2022 (aged 85)
- Party: PSI (until 1994); FI (1994–2006)
- Occupation: Lawyer

Domenico Contestabile (11 August 1937 – 28 October 2022) was an Italian lawyer and politician. A member of Forza Italia, he served in the Senate of the Republic from 1994 to 2006.

Until his election at the Italian Senate, he was one of the lawyers of Silvio Berlusconi.

Contestabile died on 28 October 2022, at the age of 85.
