= Elidio De Paoli =

Italian politician

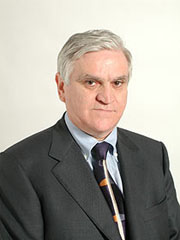

Member of the Senate
- In office 23 April 1992 – 8 May 1996
- In office 30 May 2001 – 27 April 2006

Personal details
- Born: 26 August 1948 (age 77) Rezzato, Lombardy, Italy
- Party: Lombard Alpine League (1992–1996); League for Autonomy – Lombard Alliance (since 1996)
- Profession: Politician

Elidio De Paoli (born 26 August 1948 in Rezzato) is an Italian politician.

== Biography ==
De Paoli was elected Senator for the first time in 1992, among the ranks of the Lombard Alpine League, and re-confirmed in the 1994 general election too. In 1996, he was a candidate with the League for Autonomy – Lombard Alliance, but he failed in his bid to be elected.

In the 1999 election, he was a candidate for the European Parliament for the Pensioners' Party. In 2001, he was elected to the Senate again and held office until 2006.

On the occasion of the 2006 general election, he signed a pact with The Union, a political coalition led by Romano Prodi. De Paoli failed to be elected to the Senate, but his party was decisive for the electoral victory of the coalition, so he was appointed Undersecretary for Sport in the second Prodi government.
