= Rozzano =

- Comune
- Rozzano sul Naviglio
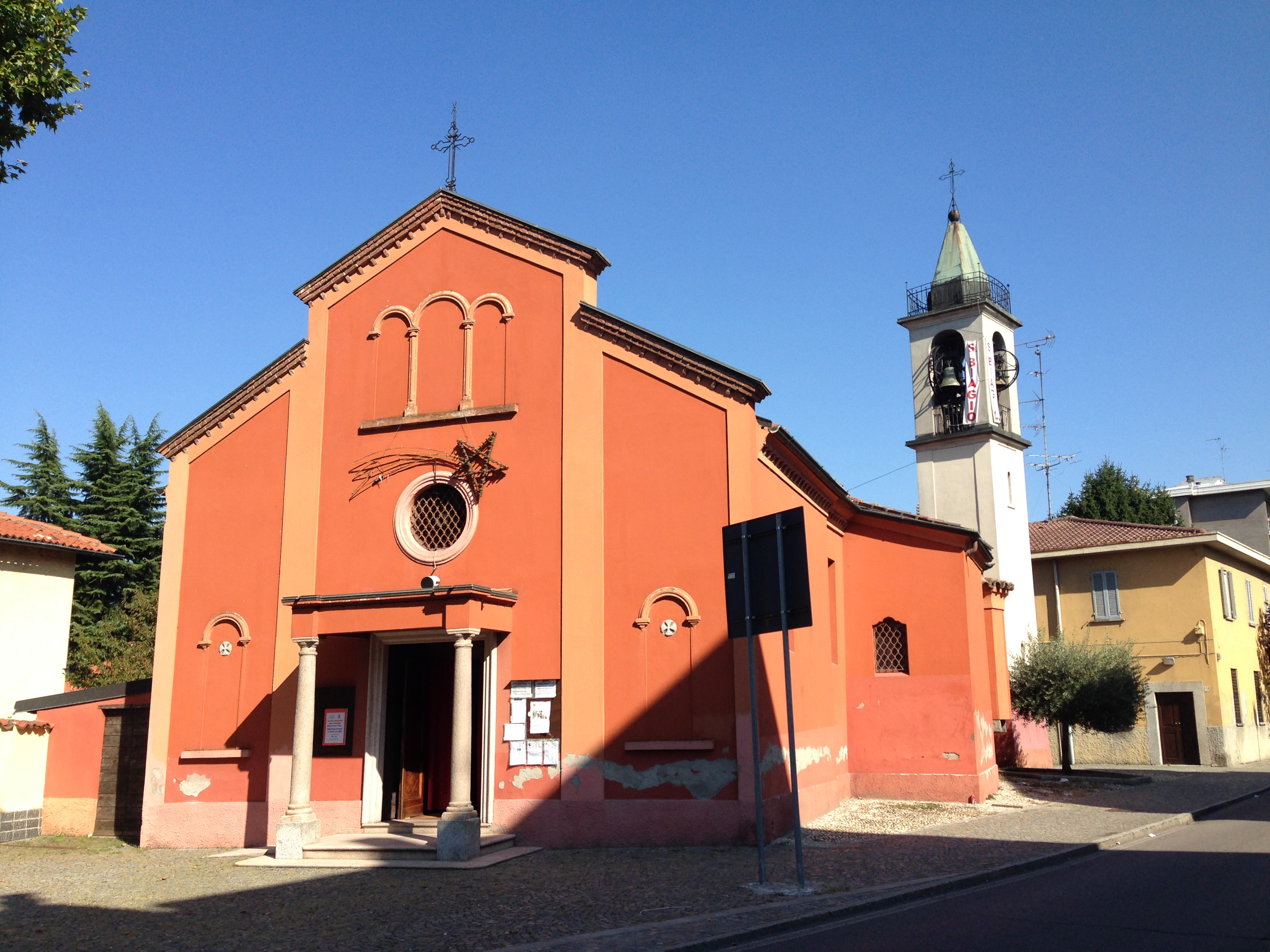

- Flag Coat of arms

- Location within Italy Location within Lombardy
- Coordinates: 45°23′N 9°9′E
- Country: Italy
- Region: Lombardy
- Metropolitan city: Milan (MI)
- Frazioni: Cassino Scanasio, Pontesesto, Quinto de' Stampi, Torriggio, Valleambrosia

Government
  - Mayor: Mattia Ferretti (Civic list (Centre-right))

Area
  - Total: 12.3 km^{2} (4.7 sq mi)
- Elevation: 103 m (338 ft)

Population (30 November 2025)
  - Total: 41,663
  - Density: 3,390/km^{2} (8,770/sq mi)
- Demonym: Rozzanesi
- Time zone: UTC+1 (CET)
  - Summer (DST): UTC+2 (CEST)
- Postal code: 20089
- Dialing code: 02
- ISTAT code: 015189
- Website: Official website

Rozzano (Lombard: Rozzan [ruˈsãː]) is a comune (municipality) in the Metropolitan City of Milan, in the Italian region Lombardy, located about 9 kilometres (6 mi) south of Milan.

Rozzano borders the following municipalities: Milan, Assago, Zibido San Giacomo, Opera, Pieve Emanuele, Basiglio.

Rozzano received the honorary title of city with a presidential decree on July 21, 2003.

== History ==
The first government to officialise the birth of the municipality of Rozzano was that of Napoleon who in 1809 decreed the annexation of Torriggio and in 1811 those of Cassino Scanasio, Pontesesto and Quinto de' Stampi. The Austrians first annulled everything in 1816, but then reconsidered regarding Torriggio and Cassino Scanasio in 1841, while it was Vittorio Emanuele II in 1870 who sanctioned the final union with Pontesesto, which also brought Quinto as a dowry.

== Main sights ==
=== Public buildings ===
- The Town hall
- Cascina Grande: the Cascina Grande in Rozzano houses two libraries: one for children (books, toy library and computer stations) up to 14 years of age, and one for adults. Historically, the Cascina Grande was a farm built in 1881 and some details of the period are still visible today, such as the mill where the library for children is now located, the part that is now reserved to adults was the stables and the part dedicated to conferences, a bar and exhibitions were the stables.
- The Old "Filanda": the former spinning mill historically used water from the Naviglio Pavese to supply energy for use within the factory. It was later closed in 1953.
- Sant'Ambrogio Church: this little church is located in the old part of the municipality and it preserves frescoes of considerable value attributed to the artists Bernardino Luini, Bergognone, Morazzone and also to an unknown artist of the Bramante school. There is also an antique organ by the artist Ugo Bernasconi dating back to 1874, who also made the majestic organ in the church of S. Giovanni in Laterano in Rome.
- Sant'Angelo Church: the parish is located in the centre of the IACP housing estate near the commercial area and the town hall.

=== Private buildings ===
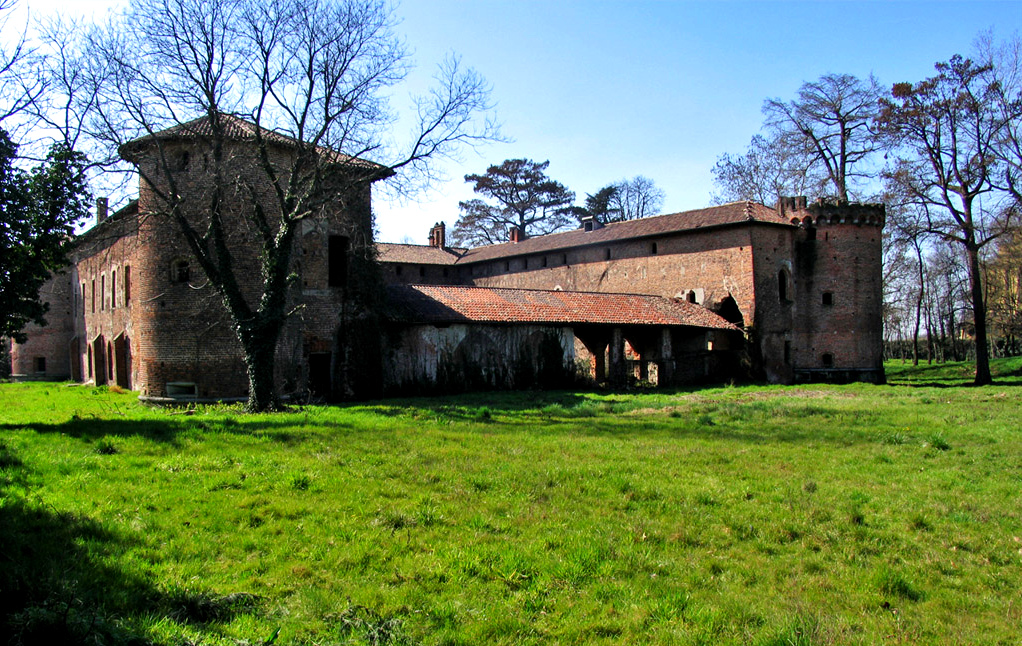
Visconti Castle

- Visconti Castle: this rectangular building with an inner courtyard and four corner towers is situated in Cassino Scanasio, a hamlet of Rozzano municipality. Access is via a masonry bridge and the entrance arch is carved with a Visconti snake.
- Domus Publishing
- Telecom TIM Tower
- Fiordaliso Shopping Centre: here is the world's largest living wall covered with more than 44,000 plant which attracts various species of insects and birds, which contribute to enhancing urban biodiversity.
- The Pot Museum: the AMC Industry (Alfa Metalcraft Corporation S.p.A.): AMC Italia, a cookware manufacturer present in Italy since 1970, inaugurated its new headquarters in Rozzano on Saturday 2019: it includes the Laboratorio del Gusto where cooking shows are held and a Museum of the Cookware. The Museum is unique in that it includes a historical excursus of cooking from Roman times to the present day. There is also a collection of miniature kitchens and a reconstruction of a boilermaker's workshop, i.e. the craftsman who used to make pots and pans in different shapes.

=== Parks ===
- Smeraldino Oasis
- Parco delle Rogge
- Municipal Park 1
- Municipal Park 2 (Parkobaleno)
- Municipal Park 3 (Pontesesto)
