= Roberto Di Mauro =

Italian politician

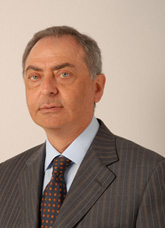
Giovanni "Roberto" Di Mauro

Giovanni Di Mauro, better known as "Roberto" (born 27 June 1956), is an Italian politician.

== Political career ==
He was a member of the Christian Democracy with which he became city councilor in 1985; he also was mayor of Agrigento from 1990 to 1991.

In the 1992 Italian general election he was elected deputy to the Chamber of Deputies in the western Sicily constituency.

From 2003 to 2006 he was Assessor of the provincial government of Agrigento led by Vincenzo Fontana.

He was a candidate in 2001 Italian general election with the CCD, since 2004 he has been a deputy to the Sicilian Regional Assembly of the XIII legislature (where he takes over from Vincenzo Lo Giudice, arrested for external competition in a mafia association).

Loyal to Raffaele Lombardo, in 2005 he was one of the founders of the Movement for Autonomy.

In the general elections of 2006 he was re-elected to the Chamber of Deputies, in the Sicily 1 constituency, on the list of "Lega Nord – Movement for Autonomy". In the chamber he therefore adheres to the Mixed Group, within the political component "MPA-Movement for Autonomy" and was a member of the Defense Commission.

On July 17, however, he resigned from the Chamber of Deputies, being replaced by Pietro Rao and going to lead the parliamentary group of the MPA in the Sicilian Regional Assembly, where he was elected in the regional elections in Sicily on May 28, 2006.

In the general elections of 2008 he was once again a candidate for the Chamber of Deputies on the lists of the Movement for Autonomy (in third position), again in the Sicily 1 constituency, being elected deputy due to the renunciations of the candidates preceding him. However, the 2008 regional elections in Sicily were also held on the same day, where Di Mauro was elected to the MPA in the constituency of Agrigento and preferred to remain a deputy in the Sicilian Regional Assembly, resigning from the Chamber of Deputies and being replaced by Ferdinando Latteri.

He then went on to fill the role of Regional Assessor for Cooperation, Commerce, Crafts and Fishing in the First Lombardo government (2008–2009). After the first reshuffle he became Regional Assessor for Budget and Finance in the second Lombardo government (2009–2010) and is reconfirmed in the third Lombardo government (2010) as Regional Assessor for Territory and Environment. He came out in the fourth Lombardo government (2010–2011).

In the European elections of 2009 he was a candidate in the insular Italy constituency in The Autonomy list, collecting a total of 56,046 preferences, but was not elected, since the list does not exceed the 4% threshold at national level.

In the regional elections in Sicily in 2012 he was reconfirmed as an ARS deputy for the Party of Sicilians, in support of the candidate for president Gianfranco Miccichè.

In the general elections of 2013 he was a candidate in Sicily for the Senate of the Republic in the Party of Sicilians (in second position, after the leader Raffaele Lombardo), however he was not elected, as the party did not exceed the threshold of 3% regional level and remains a member of the Ars.

In the Sicilian regional elections of 5 November 2017, he was once again a candidate for the ARS, as leader of Popolari e Autonomists (expression list of the MPA and Cantiere Popolare) in the province of Agrigento and at the same time also in the blocked list of the candidate for president Nello Musumeci. He is then re-elected regional deputy in the majority list.

On 18 December 2017 he was elected vice president of the Sicilian Regional Assembly with 37 votes out of 70.

In the 2022 regional elections, he once again leads the Popular and Autonomous list, which obtains 6.8% of the votes and 4 regional deputies, all from the MPA, including Di Mauro himself. On 16 November his mandate as vicar vice-president of the ARS ends; on the same date, he is sworn in as the new regional Assessor for Energy and Public Utility Services in the regional government led by Renato Schifani.

== Judicial proceedings ==
In August 1992 all the assessors of his junta were arrested during Tangentopoli, he availed himself of the parliamentary immunity obtained with the seat in Parliament for the Christian Democrats obtained recently, however he will be sentenced in first instance to 10 months' imprisonment.

Subsequently, the Court of Appeal of the District of Palermo with sentence No. 2768/98 acquitted Di Mauro of the charges of forgery ascribed to him, for not having committed the fact and through sentence No. 2756/2001 absolved Di Mauro Roberto Giovanni from the crimes ascribed to him because the fact does not constitute a crime.

Another sentence of 3 years' imprisonment in the first instance had been imposed on him, however for this crime he was subsequently acquitted in the Court of Appeal and in Cassation.
