= Giuseppe Guttadauro =

Member of the Sicilian Mafia

- Mugshot of Giuseppe Guttadauro
- Born: 18 August 1948 (age 78); Bagheria, Italy
- Other name: "u dutturi"
- Occupation: Surgeon
- Spouse: Gisella Greco
- Status: Imprisoned since 2022
- Allegiance: Sicilian Mafia
- Criminal charges: Mafia association
- Penalty: 13 years and 4 months

Giuseppe Guttadauro (born 18 August 1948) is an Italian Mafia boss and a high-profile surgeon from the Rocella neighbourhood in Palermo. Born in Bagheria, in the province of Palermo, he became the regent of Brancaccio's mandamento after the arrest and subsequent incarceration of the Mafia boss Gaspare Spatuzza in 1998.

== Ruling Brancaccio ==
According to Antonino Giuffrè, a pentito collaborating with the state, Guttadauro was an ally of Bernardo Provenzano in his attempts to reverse his former ally Totò Riina’s strategy of violence against the Italian state. “To initiate the process of remodeling the image of Cosa Nostra,” Giuffrè explained, “Guttadauro made contacts in business and started a debate on how best to apply peacefully the process of silent reconstruction of Cosa Nostra.”

Guttadauro’s grand Palermo villa served as a meeting point for both mafiosi and the people that counted in public life. According to prosecutor Roberto Scarpinato: “… first of all, members of the military Mafia would come to receive instructions regarding protection rackets, drug trafficking, and other crimes. Then, almost as if Guttadauro was doing a double shift, members of the city’s bourgeoisie would arrive, including doctors, lawyers, and politicians. These would fine-tune regional and national political strategies that were invariably designed to subjugate public institutions to the predatory interests of the friends of friends. This was achieved by bloodless, but effective, methods involving financial backing and collective resources of every type.”

Guttadauro also had business acumen. He planned the vast development of a shopping centre and multiplex in Brancaccio, selling his own land, but making sure he would be the guarantor for the protection of the site. This way he could guarantee the employment of a significant amount of mafiosi.

== Arrest ==
Guttadauro was arrested in November 2002. His wife Gisella Greco and son were arrested on 6 December 2002 in a vast operation against the Mafia (Operation Ghiaccio), in which Guttadauro received another arrest warrant. His wife and son allegedly continued to run illicit business in his absence and acted as a conduit for his messages to other Mafia bosses on the outside.

Police had bugged Guttadauro’s apartment, and he was overheard discussing political appointments with the city's public health councillor Domenico Miceli, himself a doctor. (Miceli was sentenced to eight years for mafia association in December 2006) Guttadauro learned that his home was being "bugged" from another doctor. The colleague alleged that he, in turn, had been tipped off by the President of the Sicilian region Salvatore Cuffaro.

== Supporting Cuffaro ==
Before Guttadauro discovered the eavesdropping, he was recorded apparently describing how the Mafia had funded Cuffaro's 2001 election campaign. According to a transcript, he told his brother-in-law that Cuffaro was handed packages of cash "in the least elegant, but most tangible way possible".

The inquiry set up to trace the origin of leaks during an investigation into Guttadauro led to the questioning of Cuffaro by the Palermo prosecuting office, and in September 2004, to an indictment charging Cuffaro with aiding and abetting the Mafia. Cuffaro refused to resign when sent for trial, saying he would only do so if convicted. In the meantime, he was re-elected as President in 2006 regional election defeating Rita Borsellino, the sister of the late judge Paolo Borsellino, killed by the Mafia in 1992. On 15 October 2007, the prosecution requested eight years' imprisonment for Cuffaro for passing confidential information to the so-called moles in the Palermo Antimafia directorate. Cuffaro was sentenced to seven years in prison for favouring the Mafia.

== Conviction and release ==
Guttadauro was sentenced to 13 years and four months. He was released on 2 March 2012, receiving a reduction of 800 days of his sentence for good behaviour.

== 2022 arrest ==
In February 2022, the Italian police arrested Giuseppe Guttadauro, who was placed under house arrest, and his son Mario Carlo, who ended up in prison. They are accused of mafia-type association.
