= Ruggero Razza =

Italian politician (born 1980)

Ruggero Razza MEP
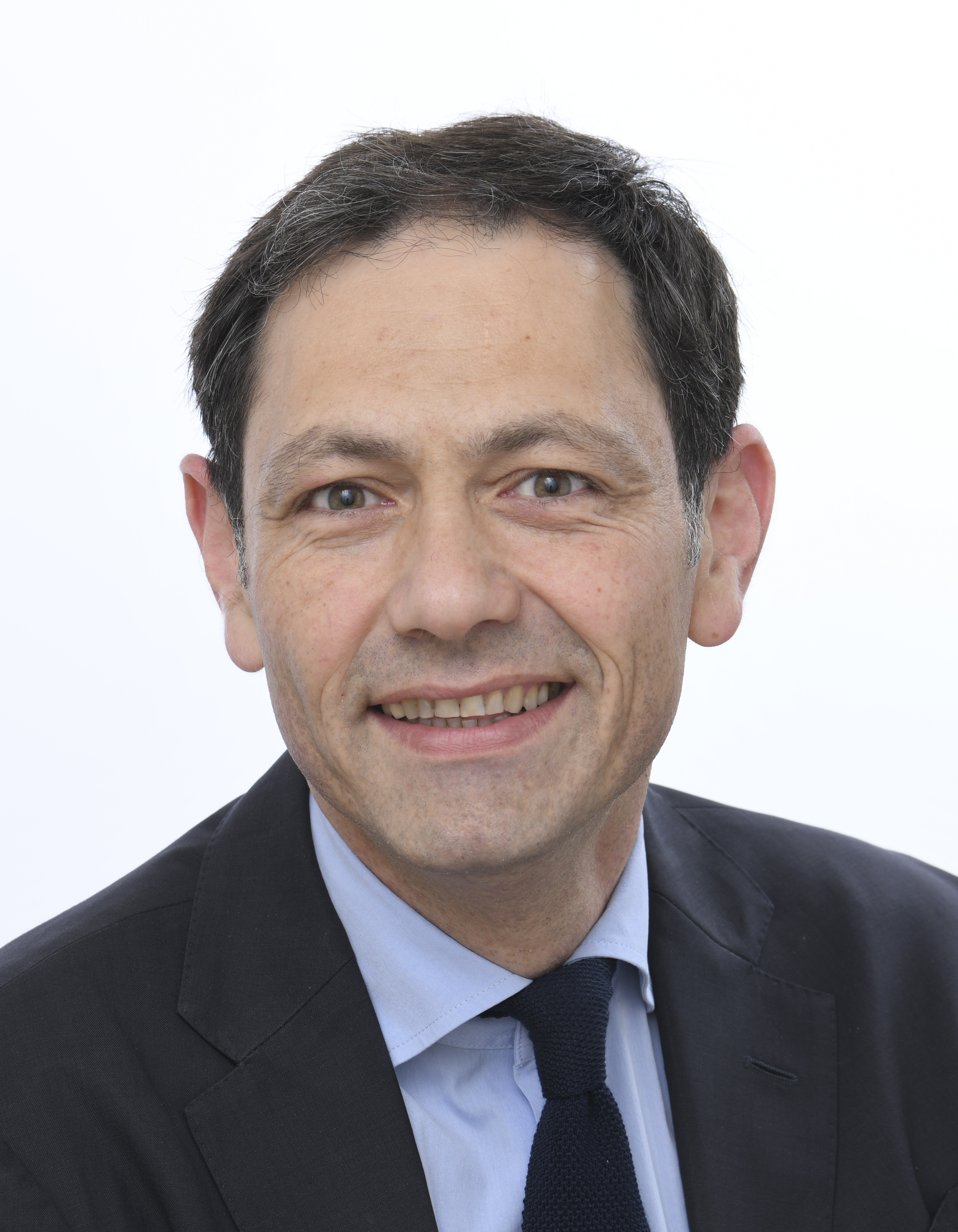

Member of the European Parliament
- Incumbent
- Assumed office 16 July 2024
- Constituency: Italian Islands

Personal details
- Born: Ruggero Benedetto Italo Razza; 23 September 1980 (age 45) Milan, Italy
- Party: Brothers of Italy
- Other political affiliations: European Conservatives and Reformists Party

Ruggero Benedetto Italo Razza (born 23 September 1980) is an Italian politician of Brothers of Italy (FdI) who was elected a member of the European Parliament (MEP) in 2024.

== Early life and career ==
Razza was born in Milan in 1980, to Catanian parents. He joined the National Alliance's youth wing Youth Action, and served as its national director. He was later a co-founder of the Sicilian Alliance, and joined The Right. In 2008 he was The Right's candidate for president of Sicily in the regional election, and was named national spokesperson of the party's youth wing Gioventù Italiana.

In 2012, he was appointed vice president of the province of Catania by Giuseppe Castiglione, a few weeks after being named assessor for cultural policies. He became coordinator of Diventerà Bellissima in 2015, and in 2017 was appointed health councillor of Sicily.
