= Sicilian Spring =

Sicilian Spring Primavera Siciliana
- President: Emilio Arcuri
- Founded: 2001
- Headquarters: Via Principe di Villafranca n° 54; 90141 Palermo
- Political position: Centre-left
- European Parliament group: shrugged

Website
- primaverasiciliana

Sicilian Spring (Italian: Primavera Siciliana) was a political party active in Sicily.

== History ==
Sicilian Spring was founded in 2001 by Emilio Arcuri, former assessor and deputy mayor of Palermo, and Stefano Vivacqua, former president of the province of Agrigento. Among the founders of the new party, aside from Emilio Arcuri and Stefano Vivacqua, there was also Rita Borsellino, who, however, decided not to run on the list.

The party ran in the 2001 Sicilian regional elections in the center-left coalition in support of Leoluca Orlando's candidacy, obtaining 1.2% of the votes and one seat in the Sicilian Regional Assembly. The deputy elected on the list of Sicilian Spring was Giovanni Ferro.

In the 2006 regional election, following the introduction of a 5% threshold, it presented its candidates on a list called "United for Sicily" (Uniti per la Sicilia), together with SDI, IdV, PRC, PdCI and Greens. The list, which was part of the coalition in support of Rita Borsellino's candidacy, obtained 5.2% of the votes and 3 seats.

== Electoral results ==
=== Sicilian regional elections ===
Election year	# of overall votes	% of overall vote	# of overall seats won
2001	29,564	1.2	1 / 80
2006	In "United for Sicily"		0 / 80
