= Spoto =

Spoto is a surname. Notable people with the surname include:

- Donald Spoto (1941–2023), American biographer and theologian
- Eric Spoto (born 1976), American arm-wrestler and powerlifte
- Francesco Spoto (1924–1964), Italian Catholic priest
