= Baldassarri =

Baldassarri is a surname. Notable people with the surname include:

- Lorenzo Baldassarri (born 1996), Italian motorcycle racer
- Mario Baldassarri (born 1946), Italian economist and politician
- Milena Baldassarri (born 2001), Italian individual rhythmic gymnast
- Sebastián Baldassarri, Argentine para-athlete
