= Great Sicily =

Great Sicily Grande Sicilia
- Founders: Raffaele Lombardo; Gianfranco Miccichè; Roberto Lagalla
- Founded: 23 March 2025
- Ideology: Regionalism; Autonomism; Christian democracy
- Political position: Centre-right
- National affiliation: Centre-right coalition
- Chamber of Deputies: 0 / 400
- Senate: 0 / 200
- European Parliament: 0 / 76
- Sicilian Regional Assembly: 7 / 70

The Great Sicily (Italian: Grande Sicilia, GS) is a regionalist and Christian-democratic political party in Italy, based in Sicily. The movement was founded and led by Raffaele Lombardo, Gianfranco Miccichè and Roberto Lagalla.

== History ==
The party Great Sicily was officially presented on 23 March 2025 in Enna, marking the beginning of a new centrist political project within the Sicilian centre-right coalition. The initiative emerged from the convergence of three distinct political experiences: Raffaele Lombardo's Movement for Autonomy (MpA), Miccichè's liberal and centre-right background within Forza Italia (FI), and Roberto Lagalla's civic experience as mayor of Palermo close to the Union of the Centre (UdC). At its launch, the founders described the movement as an inclusive platform bringing together "civics, autonomists, and democrats", a formula that was incorporated into the party's official name and symbol.

In its initial phase, GS focused on organizational consolidation across the island, announcing the creation of provincial and regional coordinations. Throughout 2025, the movement reported new local appointments and adhesions, particularly in western Sicily, as part of a strategy to build a structured territorial network. In 2026, the leadership of Great Sicily stated that the movement's objective was to present its own autonomous list at the 2027 Sicilian regional elections.

== See also ==
- Southern Italy autonomist movements
- Movement for Autonomy
