= List of presidents of the Province of Catania =

President of the Province of Catania
- Presidente della Provincia di Catania
- Inaugural holder: Francesco Tenerelli
- Formation: 1889
- Final holder: Giuseppe Castiglione
- Abolished: 2012
- Superseded by: Metropolitan mayor of Catania

The president of the Province of Catania was the head of the provincial administration of Catania, a local government authority in Sicily, Italy.

The province was replaced in 2016 by the Metropolitan City of Catania.

== List ==
=== Presidents of the Provincial Deputation (1889–1928) ===
No.	Portrait	Name	Term of office		Party
No.	Portrait	Name	Start	End	Party
1		Francesco Tenerelli	1889	1892	
2		Giovanni Auteri Beretta	1892	1905	
3		Luigi Landolina	1905	1906	
4		G. Paternò di Castello	1906	1907	
3		Luigi Landolina	1907	1909	
5		Salvatore Favitta	1909	?	
		?	?	?	

=== Presidents of the Provincial Rectorate (1929–1943) ===
No.	Portrait	Name	Term of office		Party
No.	Portrait	Name	Start	End	Party
1		Vincenzo Lo Giudice	30 August 1929	26 September 1935	National Fascist Party
2		Gerolamo Longhena	27 September 1935	8 December 1943	National Fascist Party

=== Presidents of the Provincial Deputation (1943–1947) ===
No.	Portrait	Name	Term of office		Party
No.	Portrait	Name	Start	End	Party
1		Roberto Giuffrida	9 December 1943	18 October 1946	
–		Umberto Mondio (prefectural commissioner)	19 October 1946	28 May 1947	—
–		Salvatore Ferro (prefectural commissioner)	29 May 1947	18 June 1947	—

=== Presidents of the Province (1947―2012) ===
Portrait	Name	Term of office		Party
Portrait	Name	Start	End	Party
	Carlo Amico	19 June 1947	17 June 1957	
	Salvatore Papale	18 June 1957	8 April 1958	Christian Democracy
	Antonino Drago	9 April 1958	5 December 1958	Christian Democracy
	Orazio Condorelli	6 December 1958	15 October 1961	Monarchist National Party
	Antonino Drago	16 October 1961	22 October 1964	Christian Democracy
	Armando Palazzo (acting president)	23 October 1964	22 December 1964	Christian Democracy
	Nicolò Nicoletti	23 December 1964	25 January 1972	
	Antonino Torrisi	26 January 1972	13 May 1973	
	Vincenzo Auteri	14 May 1973	6 November 1973	
	Nicolò Nicoletti	7 November 1973	5 August 1975	
	Stefano Scandura	6 August 1975	2 August 1976	
	Giacomo Sciuto	3 August 1976	28 June 1982	
	Salvatore Distefano	29 June 1982	3 June 1984	Christian Democracy
	Antonio Torrisi	4 June 1984	1 February 1987	Christian Democracy
	Alfredo Bernardini	2 February 1987	27 March 1987	Italian Socialist Party
	Onofrio Zaccone (prefectural commissioner)	28 March 1987	26 November 1987	—
	Alfredo Bernardini	27 November 1987	11 June 1989	Italian Socialist Party
	Giulio Sascia Tignino	12 June 1989	9 October 1991	Italian Socialist Party
	Diego Di Gloria	10 October 1991	20 November 1991	Christian Democracy
	Carmelo Rapisarda	21 November 1991	16 March 1993	Italian Republican Party
	Francesco Altamore	17 March 1993	10 August 1993	Italian Socialist Party
	Antonino Pennisi (prefectural commissioner)	11 August 1993	18 February 1994	—
	Nello Musumeci	19 February 1994	2 June 2003	National Alliance
	Raffaele Lombardo	3 June 2003	12 February 2008	Union of the Centre; Movement for Autonomy
	Rodolfo Casarubea (prefectural commissioner)	28 February 2008	17 June 2008	—
	Giuseppe Castiglione	18 June 2008	12 November 2012	Forza Italia; The People of Freedom
	Antonina Liotta (extraordinary commissioner)	12 November 2012	2 January 2014	—
	Giuseppe Romano (extraordinary commissioner)	2 January 2014	8 June 2016	—

== Sources ==
- "Storia amministrativa dell'ente". Ministero dell'Interno.
- "I Presidenti della Provincia Regionale" (in Italian). Città Metropolitana di Catania.
- Menichini, Piera (2005). "I presidenti delle Province dall'Unità alla Grande guerra: repertorio analitico". Storia Amministrazione Costituzione (13): 240–241.
