= Salvatore Cuffaro =

Italian politician (born 1958)

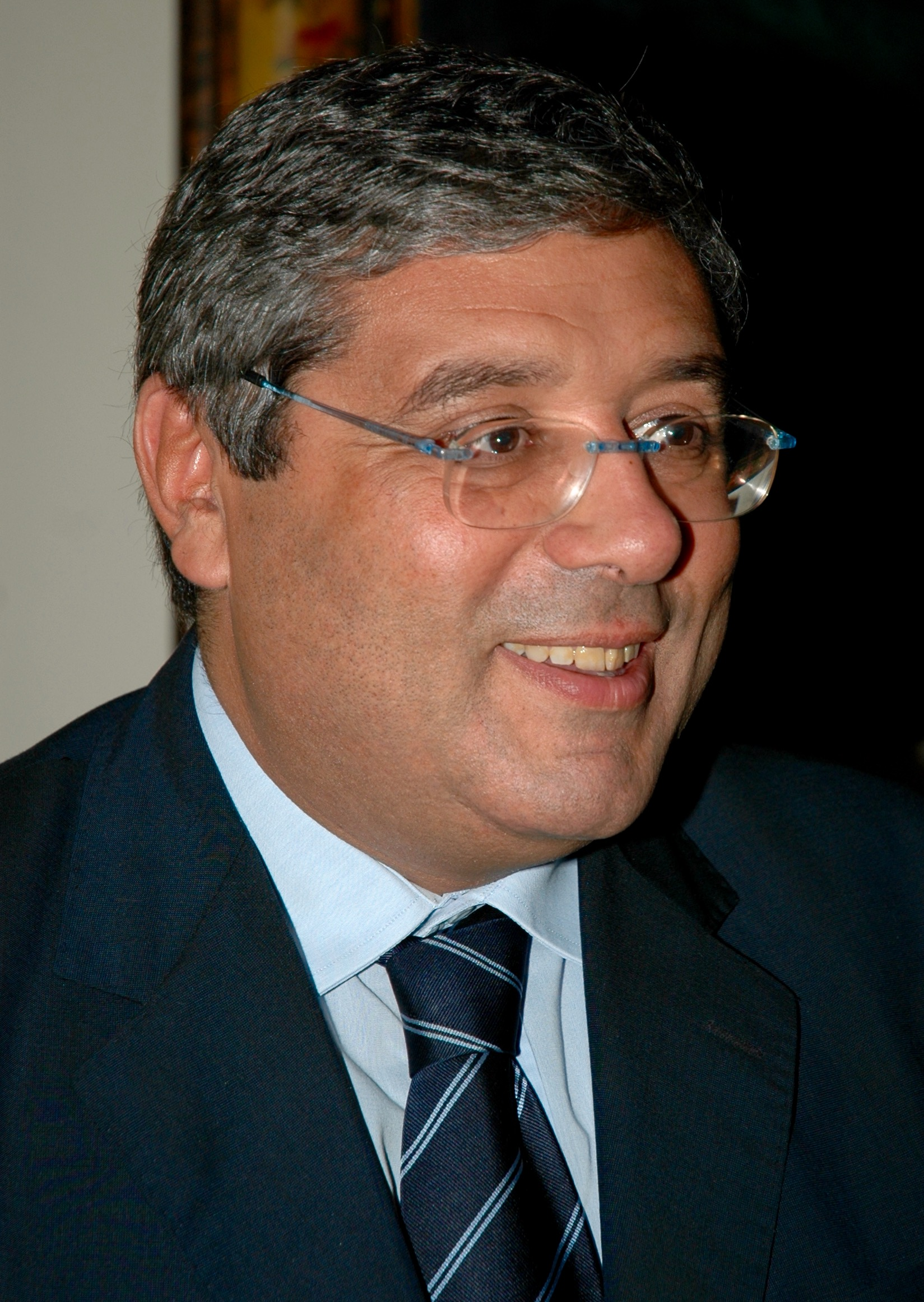

President of Sicily
- In office 17 July 2001 – 26 January 2008
- Preceded by: Vincenzo Leanza
- Succeeded by: Raffaele Lombardo

Member of the Senate of the Republic
- In office 29 April 2008 – 2 February 2011
- In office 28 April 2006 – 24 July 2006
- Constituency: Sicily

Personal details
- Born: 21 February 1958 (age 68) Raffadali, Sicily, Italy
- Party: DC (1978–1994); PPI (1994–1995); CDU (1995–1998); UDR (1998–1999); UDEUR (1999–2000); CDU (2000–2002); UDC (2002–2010); PID (2010–2011); DCS (since 2020)
- Education: University of Palermo; Sapienza University of Rome

Salvatore Cuffaro
- Other names: Totò Vasa Vasa ("Totò Kiss Kiss")
- Occupations: Former politician, doctor (expelled from medical order)
- Spouse: Giacoma Chiarelli
- Children: 2
- Status: Arrested on 22 January 2011, released on 13 December 2015 (served his sentence at the Rebibbia Criminal Penitentiary, Rome)
- Convictions: Aiding and abetting Cosa Nostra (It. favoreggiamento aggravato; art. 416-bis c.p.)
- Criminal charges: Aiding and abetting Cosa Nostra (It. favoreggiamento aggravato; art. 416-bis c.p.)
- Penalty: 7 years in prison, life ban from public office

Salvatore "Totò" Cuffaro (born 21 February 1958) is a former Italian politician and former President of Sicily. He has served an almost 5-year jail sentence for aiding Cosa Nostra. He has earned the nickname Vasa Vasa (Sicilian for "Kiss Kiss") for his tendency to kiss everybody; he says that he has kissed a quarter of all the people on the island.

== Biography ==
=== Christian democrat ===
A graduate of medicine and surgery at the University of Palermo, with a specialization in radiology, Cuffaro was expelled from the medical order for indignity. He joined the Christian Democrat (DC) party during his student days. Then, after having served as City Councillor in his native city, Raffadali, and Palermo, Cuffaro was first elected Member of the Sicilian Regional Assembly in 1991. In 1996, he served as Regional Minister of Agriculture and Fisheries.

His political career began under the wing of former minister Calogero Mannino, who in the past was suspected of having ties with the Mafia. Following the demise of the DC, he became a member of ex-DC splinter parties before joining the party Union of Christian and Centre Democrats (UDC). He first became known nationally in September 1991, when he defended his political patron Mannino, accused of being a witness at a Mafia wedding, live on television in a joint broadcasting of the Maurizio Costanzo show and Michele Santoro's Samarcanda, accusing the presenters that their journalism was Mafia journalism. Later, Mannino was absolved. For many years it was falsely told that: "In the presence of Antimafia judge Giovanni Falcone he (Cuffaro) accused the Sicilian prosecutors of manipulating state witnesses (pentiti). In October 2009, Cuffaro denounced for "defamation and threats" the 5000 and above YouTube users who commented on the video of the TV show. But, with judgment number 1742 of 2013, the Civil Court of Palermo ordered compensation in favour of Cuffaro by Antonio Di Pietro, who had linked on its website the video of Cuffaro in Samarcanda under the title "Costanzo show: Totò Cuffaro attacks Giovanni Falcone. "In its judgment the Court found that "there is no evidence of a direct attack from Cuffaro against Prosecutor Falcone," and that Cuffaro himself, if anything, had criticized an investigation that was declared unfounded a few days later. In any case, the prosecutor criticized by Cuffaro was another one, not Falcone.

In 2001, after having joined the UDC, Cuffaro was endorsed by the House of Freedoms as presidential candidate for Sicily. He won the election, with 59.1% of the vote, defeating Leoluca Orlando. Cuffaro was elected as part of Silvio Berlusconi's sensational clean sweep of the island when his coalition won all 61 of its parliamentary seats.

On 26 June 2003, it was revealed that Cuffaro was being investigated for Mafia-related crimes, after Domenico Miceli, a fellow UDC politician, was arrested for allegedly acting as a link between a Mafia chief and top Sicilian politicians, including Cuffaro. A few months later he was committed for trial. Despite all this, Cuffaro stood for the 2004 European Parliament election. Later that year, Cuffaro was appointed national vice-secretary of UDC, the party headed by Pier Ferdinando Casini. Until 2008 he was also President of COPPEM.

=== Re-elected ===
In the 2006 Italian general election, he was elected senator for his party, UDC. In the 2006 regional election, he was successively re-elected President of Sicily with 53.1% of the vote, defeating Rita Borsellino, the Union candidate and sister of the late judge Paolo Borsellino, killed by the mafia in 1992.

Cuffaro and the Italian Minister of Justice, Clemente Mastella were involved in a scandal when it was found that they had been best men of Francesco Campanella, a former member of the Mafia and town councillor of Villabate, who helped the boss Bernardo Provenzano during his absconding. In 2001 Campanella used his official position to supply Cosa Nostra's top "godfather" with an identity card so he could travel abroad for medical treatment. In July 2000 Mastella and Cuffaro had been witnesses at Campanella's wedding.

In the year 2005, he was the object of media attention thanks to the television reportage La Mafia è Bianca (The Mafia is White) by investigative journalists Stefano Maria Bianchi and Alberto Nerazzini, which aimed to expose rife corruption in the Sicilian Health service and shows a clip of police film footage of Cuffaro meeting with a known mafioso. Cuffaro tried unsuccessfully to prevent the publishers from broadcasting their reportage on the grounds of its allegedly "defamatory" contents but in January 2006 the Civil Court in Bergamo rejected his request, stating that both text and video, including the audio commentary by the journalists, were not defamatory. Following later investigations and trial Cuffaro has been jailed for seven years after losing a final appeal against a mafia conviction and being banned for life from holding public office.

== Mafia indictment and conviction ==
On 15 October 2007, assistant public prosecutor Giuseppe Pignatone requested eight years' imprisonment for Cuffaro charged with aiding and abetting Cosa Nostra and passing confidential information about the trial to the so-called moles in the Palermo Antimafia directorate.

Cuffaro's indictment emerged from an inquiry set up to trace leaks during an inquiry into a local doctor, Giuseppe Guttadauro, accused of being the Cosa Nostra boss in its Palermo stronghold Brancaccio. Guttadauro learned that his home was being "bugged" from another doctor. The colleague alleged that he, in turn, had been tipped off by Cuffaro. Guttadauro was recorded describing how the Mafia had funded Cuffaro's 2001 election campaign. According to a transcript, he said that Cuffaro was handed packages of cash "in the least elegant, but most tangible way possible".

On 18 January 2008, Cuffaro was found guilty of having helped the Mafia and was given a five-year sentence, during which time he will be suspended from all public offices. Cuffaro was not found guilty of outright collusion with Cosa Nostra but the court concluded he acted in favour of several people sentenced for Mafia crimes and committed breaches of confidentiality. By Italian law, both the sentence and suspension from public office can only begin after the automatic appeals process is concluded. The prosecution had asked that Cuffaro be given an eight-year sentence but judges concluded that while he had helped the Mafia, there had been neither conspiracy nor willful intent. He has denied all wrongdoing and refused to step down, despite that he has also been banned from public office. "I knew I didn't do anything to willfully help the Mafia and tomorrow morning I intend to be back at my desk," Cuffaro said after the court adjourned.

The day after, Cuffaro handed out cannoli, a Sicilian pastry, as if celebrating the sentence, which he considered positive as he was not convicted for ties to the Mafia. The ricotta sweets have become "instrumentalized," he told the daily Corriere della Sera. Adding that he "never celebrated" and fully understands the weight of the charges brought against him. He didn't bring the celebratory cannoli with him, but one of his many well-wishers did.

=== Resignation ===
Cuffaro resigned on 26 January 2008. His resignation followed reports that the national government was planning a move to oust him. The announcement represents a reversal for Cuffaro, who earlier said he would hang on to his post and appeal his five-year prison sentence of 18 January. Many, including some politicians from allied parties, were angry that he celebrated not being convicted of a more serious accusation – helping the Mafia as an organization. The head of Italy's politically influential industrial lobby, Confindustria, lamented that Cuffaro remained in office while Sicilian businessmen were defying the Mafia by increasingly refusing to pay systematic "protection" money. A widely published photo of him offering his aides a tray of cannoli pastries to celebrate fuelled the outrage.

=== Re-election and appeals trial ===
While Cuffaro was undergoing his appeals trial, the Union of the Centre nominated him in the 2008 general election and he was re-elected senator. On 23 January 2010 the Palermo Appeals Court confirmed his two previous convictions and added the aggravation of favouring the Mafia, sentencing him to seven years in prison. He subsequently announced his intention to appeal the sentence before the Supreme Court and to resign from all party offices.

== Supreme Court Final conviction ==
On 22 January 2011, the Italian Supreme Court definitively confirmed the seven-year prison sentence and the perpetual ban from holding public office.

=== Seven years of prison ===
Salvatore Cuffaro served his time in jail at the Roman prison of Rebibbia. He was taken to Rome's Rebbibia prison the same day the Supreme Court confirmed the mafia conviction. As a result of his conviction, he lost his seat in the Senate. Under the term of the sentencing as a mafia convict, Cuffaro is also barred in perpetuity from holding public office. He served his sentence and was released on 13 December 2015.
