= 2006 Sicilian regional election =

- 28 May 2006

All 80 seats to the Sicilian Regional Assembly
- Turnout: 59.17% (▼4.33%)
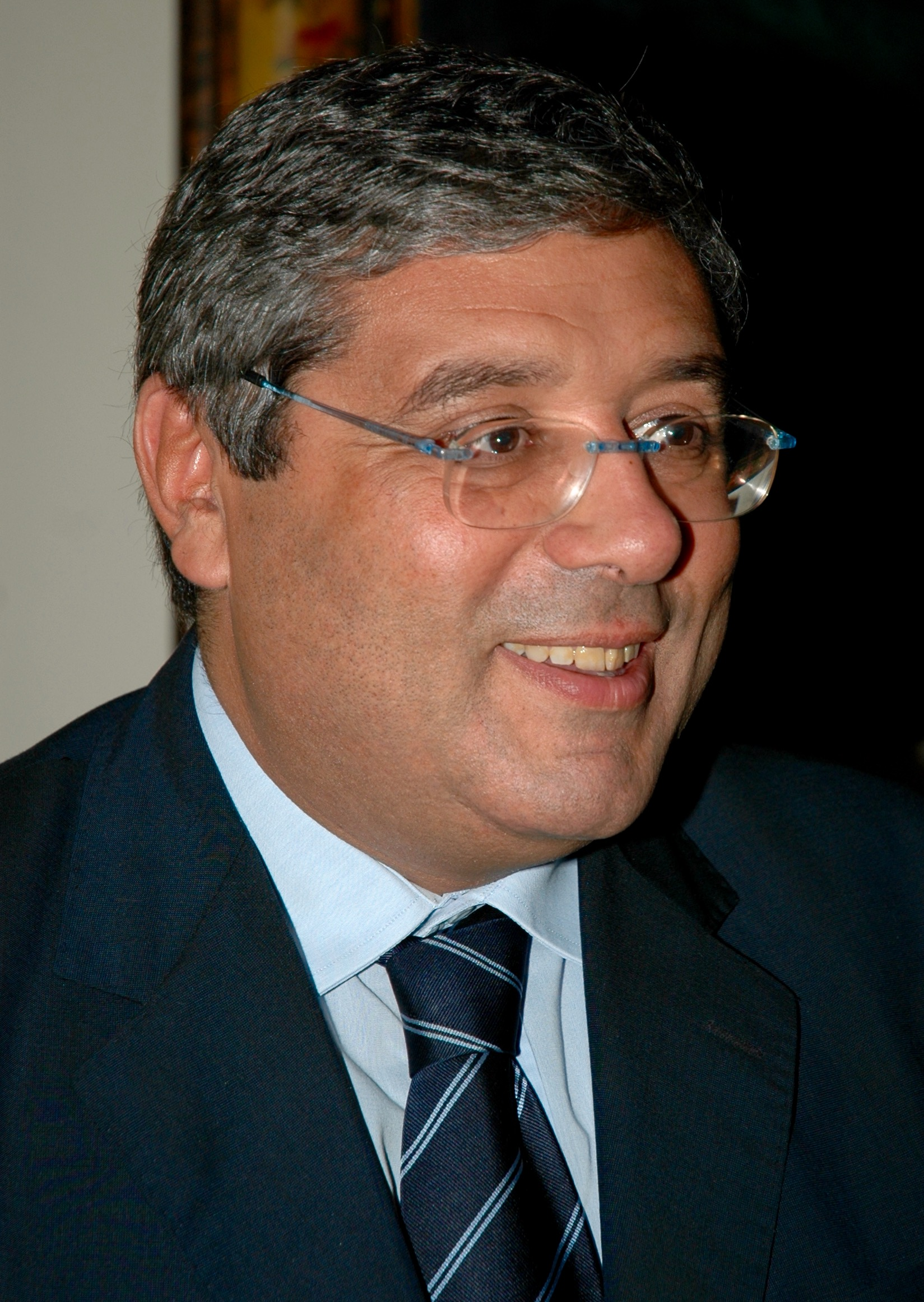

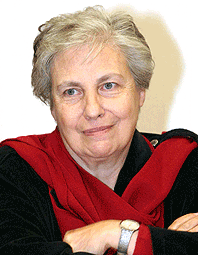
	Majority party	Minority party
Leader	Salvatore Cuffaro	Rita Borsellino
Party	UDC	Independent
Alliance	House of Freedoms	The Union
Last election	57 seats, 59.1%	29 seats, 36.6%
Seats won	62	28
Seat change	▲5	▼1
Popular vote	1,374,706	1,078,179
Percentage	53.1%	41.6%
Swing	▼6.0%	▲5.0%
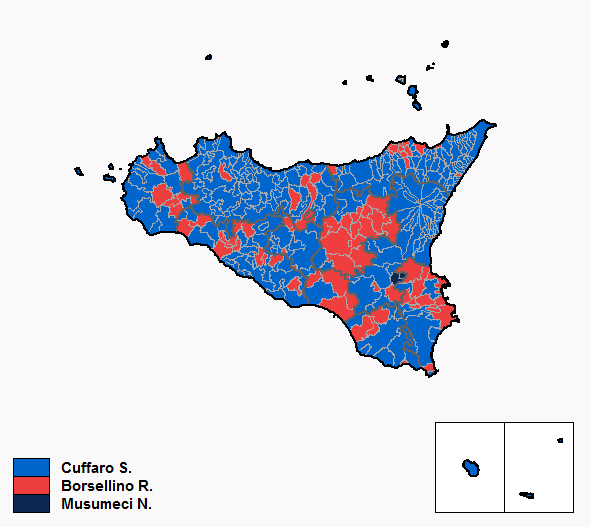
President before election
Salvatore Cuffaro
UDC
President-elect
Salvatore Cuffaro
UDC

The 2006 Sicilian regional election for the renewal of the Sicilian Regional Assembly and the Presidency of Sicily was held on 28 May 2006.

The election was competed by three competitors: Salvatore Cuffaro, incumbent president and House of Freedoms candidate; Rita Borsellino, candidate of The Union; and Nello Musumeci, MEP elected for the National Alliance and now leader of the autonomist movement Sicilian Alliance. In the end, Cuffaro won the election, despite a heavy loss of support compared with five years before, when he was elected with 59.1% of votes.

== Candidates ==
Salvatore Cuffaro, 48, was first elected at the Sicilian Presidency in the July 2001 with 59.1% of regional votes; that election was held immediately after the national election which saw the centre-right win all the 61 Sicilian ridings. Cuffaro is a prominent member of Union of Christian and Centre Democrats, a Christian democratic party. Often associated to the mafia by his critics because of an open investigation by the magistrature of Palermo which brought to a trial commitment, Cuffaro was nevertheless head the regional UDC list of candidates for the April general election.

Rita Borsellino, 61, sister of the late judge Paolo assassinated by the mafia, gained the centre-left candidacy after having won a primary election with over 67% of votes against Ferdinando Latteri. She was not member of any party.

Nello Musumeci, 51, was a former member of the right-wing National Alliance party; he served as President of the Province of Catania from 1994 to 2003. He left National Alliance in September 2005 in order to found a new autonomist party, Sicilian Alliance, of which he was the leader.

Pollster claimed this election to be much closer than five years earlier, and majority of surveys even put Borsellino to lead over Cuffaro. However, Sicily confirmed one more time in the April 2006 national election, in which the House of Freedoms obtained 57% of regional votes, to be still a centre-right stronghold. The election was in fact characterized by separate contemporary votes for centre-right parties and Rita Borsellino as president, as the sum of centre-right coalition parties obtained over 60% of votes. In any case, the disjoint vote was not sufficient to ensure Borsellino to win the election, and Cuffaro was confirmed president of Sicily.

== Results ==
28 May 2006 Sicilian regional election results
Candidates	Votes	%	Seats	Parties	Votes	%	Seats
Salvatore Cuffaro	1,374,706	53.09	9				
Salvatore Cuffaro	1,374,706	53.09	9	Forza Italia	471,634	19.17	17
Salvatore Cuffaro	1,374,706	53.09	9	Union of Christian and Centre Democrats	319,349	12.98	11
Salvatore Cuffaro	1,374,706	53.09	9	Movement for Autonomy – New Sicily	308,219	12.53	10
Salvatore Cuffaro	1,374,706	53.09	9	National Alliance	259,927	10.56	9
Salvatore Cuffaro	1,374,706	53.09	9	The Kite	139,344	5.66	6
Salvatore Cuffaro	1,374,706	53.09	9	Tricolour Flame	8,528	0.35	–
Salvatore Cuffaro	1,374,706	53.09	9	Christian Democracy for Autonomies	6,530	0.26	–
Salvatore Cuffaro	1,374,706	53.09	9	Total	1,513,531	61.52	53
Rita Borsellino	1,078,179	41.64	1				
Rita Borsellino	1,078,179	41.64	1	Democrats of the Left	344,551	14.00	12
Rita Borsellino	1,078,179	41.64	1	Democracy is Freedom – The Daisy	295,762	12.02	12
Rita Borsellino	1,078,179	41.64	1	United for Sicily (SDI–IdV–PRC–PdCI–FdV–Sicilian Spring)	127,947	5.20	3
Rita Borsellino	1,078,179	41.64	1	Rita – My Commitment for Sicily	119,177	4.84	–
Rita Borsellino	1,078,179	41.64	1	Total	887,437	36.07	27
Nello Musumeci	136,545	5.27	–	Sicilian Alliance	59,380	2.41	–
Total candidates	2,589,430	100.00	10	Total parties	2,460,348	100.00	80
Source: Sicilian Region

Popular vote
FI	19.17%
DS	14.00%
UDC	12.98%
MpA–NS	12.53%
DL	12.02%
AN	10.56%
LA–LP	5.66%
UpS	5.20%
Rita	4.84%
AS	2.41%

President
Cuffaro	53.09%
Borsellino	41.64%
Musumeci	5.27%

== Sources ==
- The Independent (2006-05-30). "Sicily elects governor linked with Mafia". London. Archived from the original on 2006-09-07.
- BBC (2006-05-30). "Prodi wins key cities in election". BBC News.
