= Centrists for Sicily =

Centrists for Sicily Centristi per la Sicilia
- Leader: Giampiero D'Alia
- Founded: November 2016
- Dissolved: 2017
- Headquarters: Palermo
- Ideology: Christian democracy Regionalism
- Political position: Centre
- National affiliation: Centrists for Europe

Centrists for Sicily (Italian: Centristi per la Sicilia, CpS) was a regional centrist Italian political party active in Sicily.

The party was formed in November 2016 by Gianpiero D'Alia, national president of the Union of the Centre (UdC) and bigwig of the party in Sicily, who wanted to support the "Yes" camp in the 2016 constitutional referendum, as opposed to the party's pro-"No" line, and to continue the alliance with the Democratic Party (PD). The two regional ministers in the PD-led regional government and eight regional deputies out nine joined the new party.

In December, after the huge defeat of the "Yes" camp in the referendum, the CpS was integrated into Centrists for Italy (CpI), led by Pier Ferdinando Casini, and replaced the UdC within the groups of Popular Area (AP) in the Chamber and the Senate.

For the 2017 regional elections in Sicily, the party reached an agreement with the Democratic Party and the centre-left to support Fabrizio Micari, the rector of the University of Palermo, as their candidate for President. The party stood in the election alongside Angelino Alfano’s Popular Alternative, forming the joint Popular Alternative – Centrists for Micari list. However, the list failed to clear the 5% regional threshold, securing only 4.18% of the vote, which was insufficient to elect any regional councillors.

== Electoral results ==
=== Regional elections ===
Election	Votes	%	Seats	+/–
2017	80,366 (Note: In a joint list with Popular Alternative.)	4.18	0 / 70	New
