= Pitiniana =

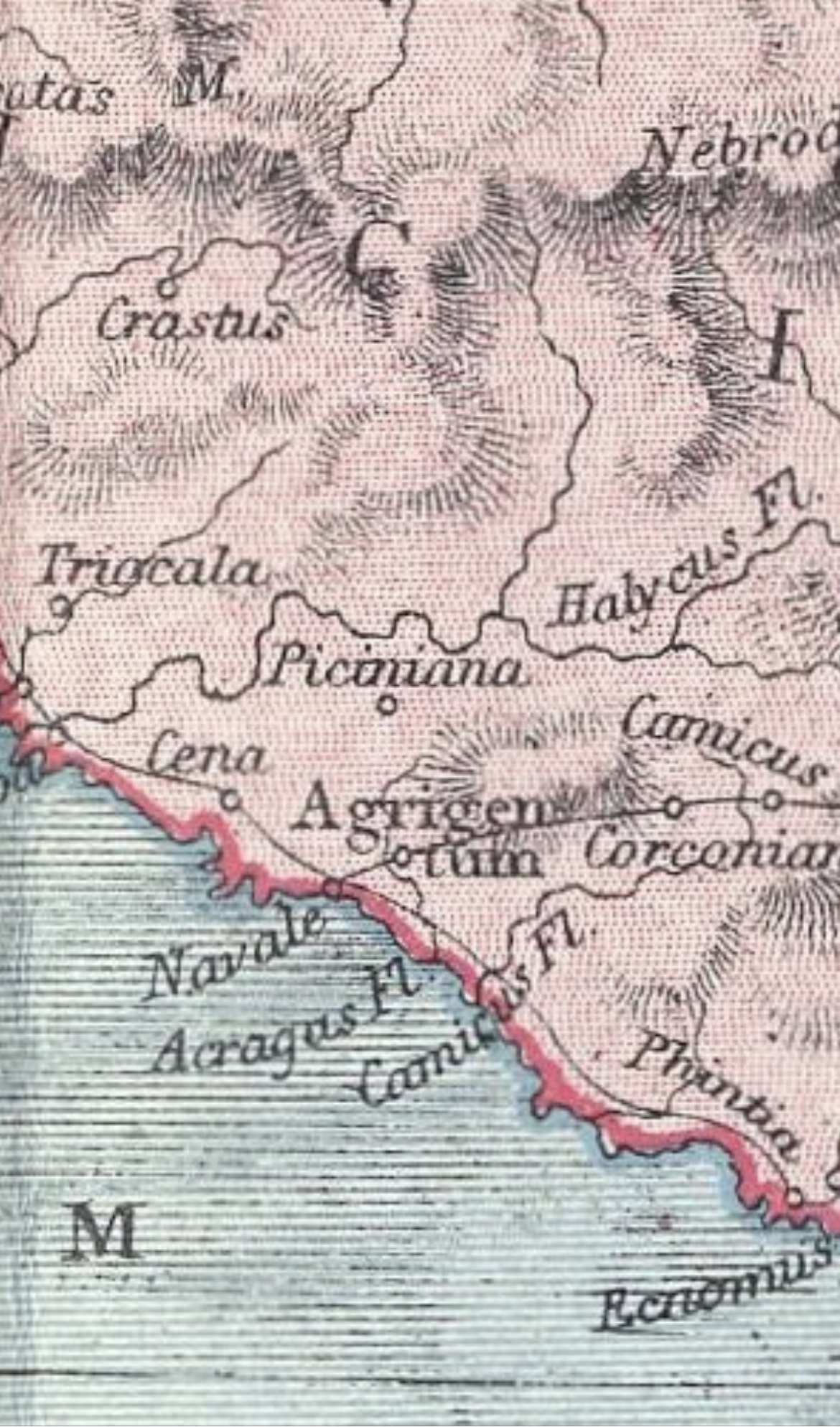
Pitiniana

Pitiniana was an ancient city of Sicily on the overland road from Agrigentum (modern Agrigento) to Panormus (modern Palermo). Its precise location is unknown, but is supposed to be near the present cities of Aragona and Raffadali.
