= Confederation of Italian Entrepreneurs Worldwide =

CIIM may also refer to the Cyprus International Institute of Management or the Canary Islands Independence Movement.

The Confederation of Italian Entrepreneurs Worldwide (it:Confederazione degli Imprenditori Italiani nel Mondo, CIIM) is a non-profit organization dedicated to bringing together entrepreneurs, business owners, corporate executives and managers interested in expanding their business network.

CIIM was founded during the first Convention of Italian Entrepreneurs Worldwide, organized in Rome in October 2003 by the Minister for Italians Living Abroad.

Participating members hold high-ranking positions in today's business community, are either Italian or of Italian origin, and reside, or have a business, abroad.

While CIIM is influenced by the main office in Rome, its chapters around the world are strategically run as independent entities and are financed by local members.

The organization is also often referenced by the international press.

== Presidents of CIIM ==
- Giuseppe Zamberletti (2004 – 2008)
- Mario Baldassarri (2008 – present)
