= 2017 Sicilian regional election =

- 5 November 2017

All 70 seats to the Sicilian Regional Assembly 36 seats needed for a majority
- Turnout: 46.76% (▼0.66%)
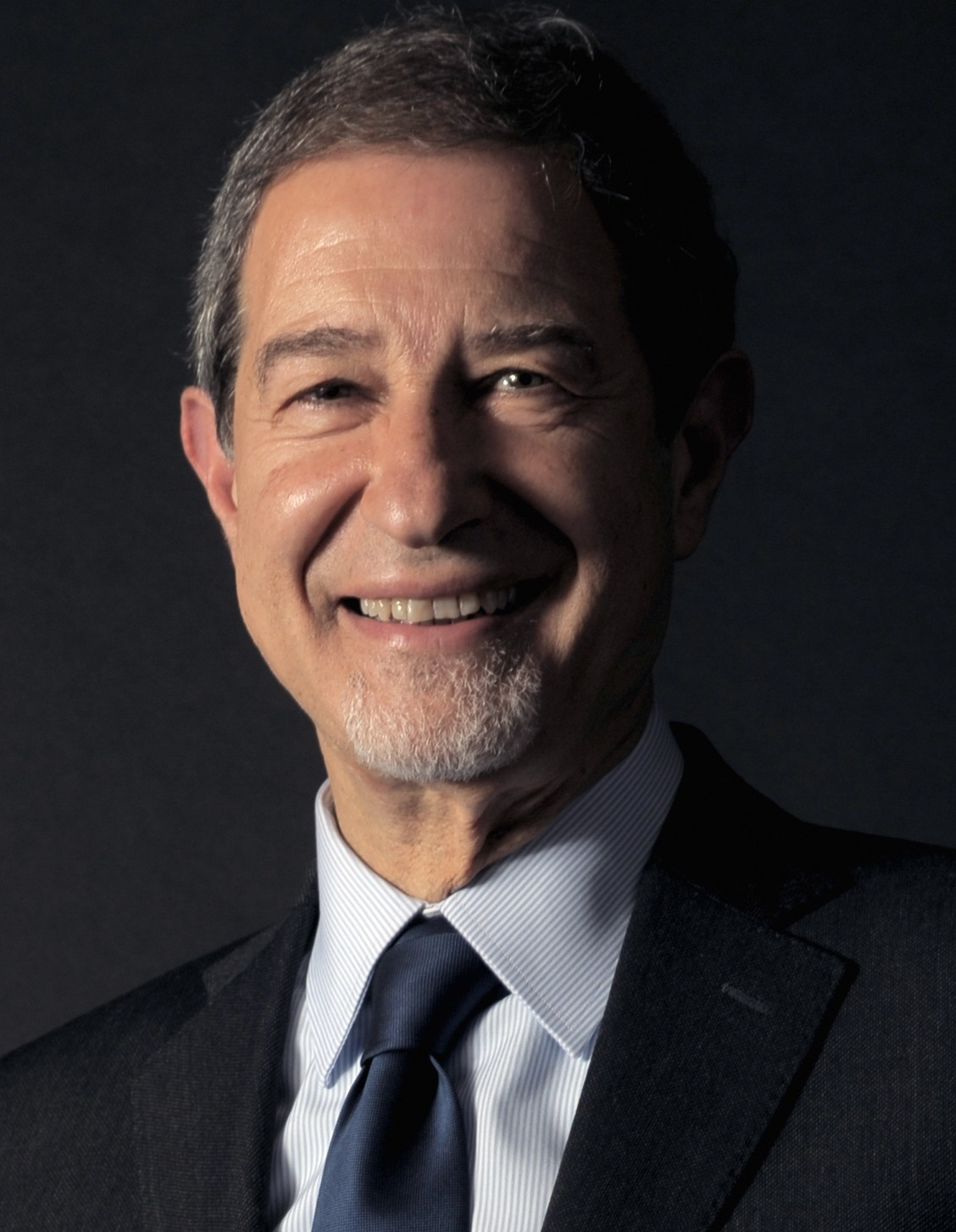

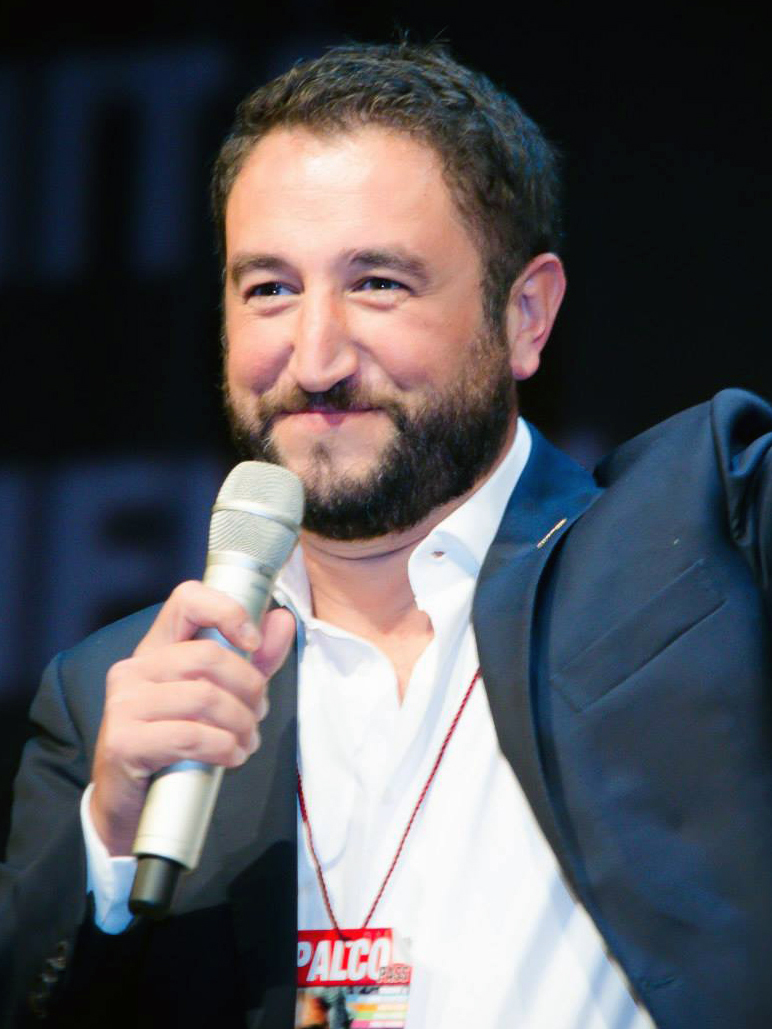

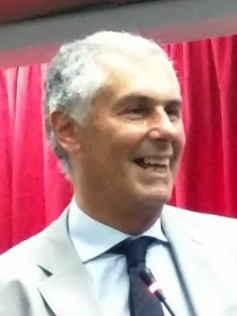

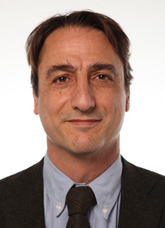
| | First party | Second party |
|---|---|---|
| Leader | Nello Musumeci | Giancarlo Cancelleri |
| Party | Diventerà Bellissima | Five Star Movement |
| Alliance | Centre-right |
| Seats won | 36 | 20 |
| Seat change | ▲15 | ▲5 |
| Popular vote | 830,821 | 722,555 |
| Percentage | 39.85% | 34.65% |
| Swing | ▼1.29% | ▲16.48% |
| | Third party | Fourth party |
| Leader | Fabrizio Micari | Claudio Fava |
| Party | Democratic Party | Article One |
| Alliance | Centre-left | One Hundred Steps for Sicily |
| Seats won | 13 | 1 |
| Seat change | ▼26 | ▼26 |
| Popular vote | 388,886 | 128,157 |
| Percentage | 18.65% | 6.15% |
| Swing | ▼11.82% | ▼0.05% |
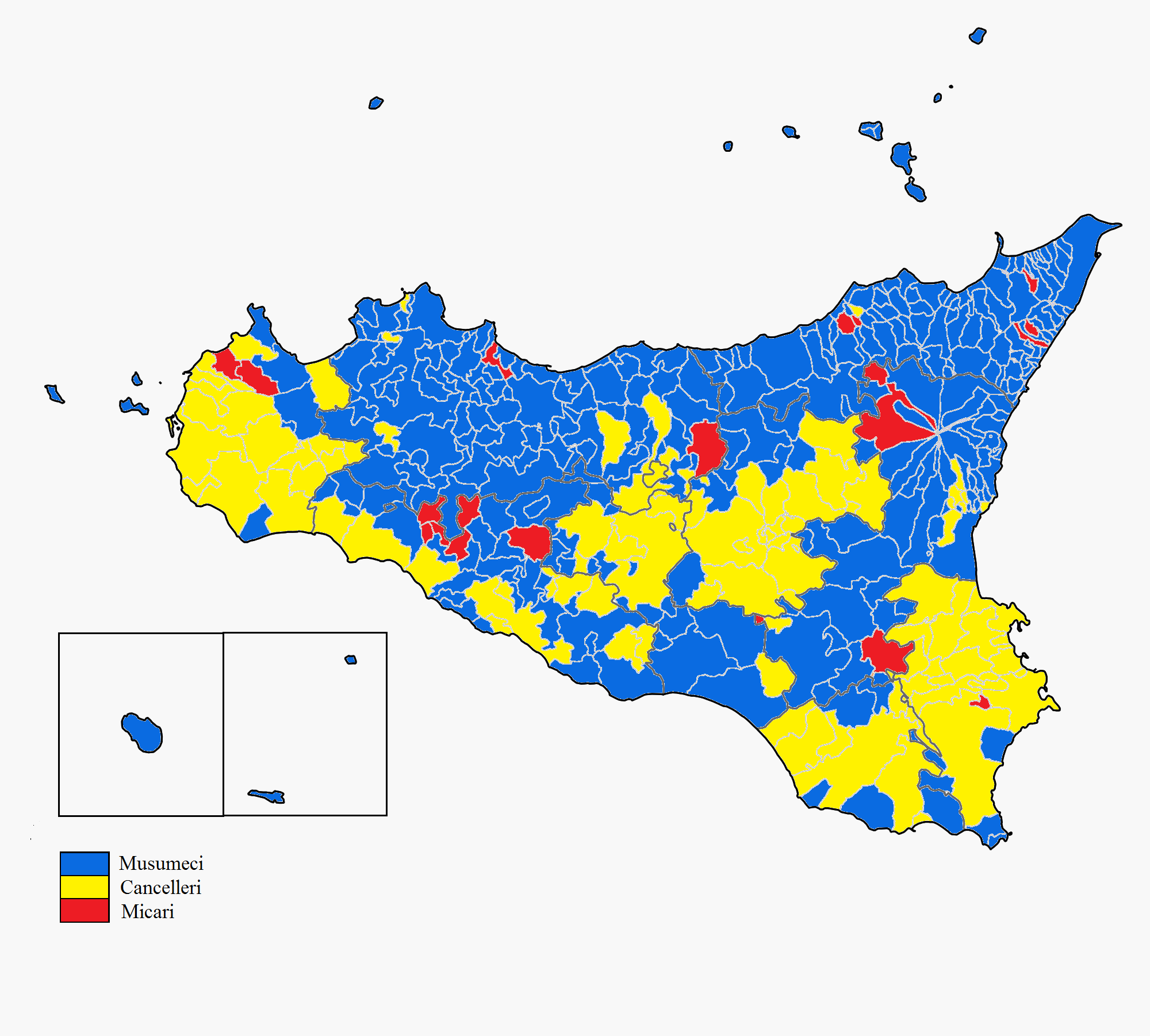
President before election
Rosario Crocetta
PD
Elected President
Nello Musumeci
DB

The 2017 Sicilian regional election for the renewal of the Sicilian Regional Assembly and the election of the President of Sicily was held on 5 November 2017. Incumbent President Rosario Crocetta was not his party's candidate due to his low popularity. Nello Musumeci, leader of the movement Diventerà Bellissima, was elected president.

== Electoral system ==
The Sicilian Parliament is elected with a mixed system: 62 MPs are chosen with a form of proportional representation using a largest remainder method with open lists and a 5% threshold, while 8 MPs (7+1) are elected using Party bloc vote.

| AG | CL | CT | EN | ME | PA | RG | SR | TP | Total |
|---|---|---|---|---|---|---|---|---|---|
| 6 | 3 | 13 | 2 | 8 | 16 | 4 | 5 | 5 | 62 |

== Parties and leaders ==
| Political party or alliance | Constituent lists | Previous result | | Candidate |
| Political party or alliance | Constituent lists | Votes (%) | Seats | Candidate |
|---|---|---|---|---|
| Centre-right coalition | Forza Italia (incl. SC and PLI) | 18.9 (Note: 12.9 (PdL) + 6.0 (GS)) | 17 (Note: 12 (PdL) + 5 (GS)) | Nello Musumeci |
| Centre-right coalition | Populars and Autonomists | 15.4 (Note: 5.9 (CP) + 9.5 (PdS)) | 14 (Note: 4 (CP) + 10 (PdS)) | Nello Musumeci |
| Centre-right coalition | Union of the Centre (incl. RD and Sicilia Vera) | 10.8 | 11 | Nello Musumeci |
| Centre-right coalition | Diventerà Bellissima (incl. EpI) | —N/a | —N/a | Nello Musumeci |
| Centre-right coalition | Brothers of Italy – Us with Salvini | —N/a | —N/a | Nello Musumeci |
| Five Star Movement | | 14.9 | 15 | Giancarlo Cancelleri |
| Centre-left coalition | Democratic Party | 13.4 | 14 | Fabrizio Micari |
| Centre-left coalition | Future Sicily – Italian Socialist Party | —N/a | —N/a | Fabrizio Micari |
| Centre-left coalition | Popular Alternative – Centrists for Micari | —N/a | —N/a | Fabrizio Micari |
| Centre-left coalition | Micari list (inc. The Megaphone) | —N/a | —N/a | Fabrizio Micari |
| One Hundred Steps for Sicily (incl. MDP, SI, PRC, FdV, Pos and PSS) | | 3.1 | – | Claudio Fava |
| Free Sicilians | | —N/a | —N/a | Roberto La Rosa |

== Opinion polling ==
| Date | Polling firm | Micari | Musumeci | Cancelleri | Fava | Others | Lead |
|---|---|---|---|---|---|---|---|
| 20 Oct 2017 | Piepoli | 25.0 | 42.0 | 25.0 | 8.0 | 0.0 | 17.0 |
| 20 Oct 2017 | Demos&Pi | 15.7 | 35.5 | 33.2 | 13.8 | 1.8 | 2.3 |
| 20 Oct 2017 | Demopolis | 21.0 | 36.0 | 35.0 | 7.0 | 1.0 | 1.0 |
| 19 Oct 2017 | Tecnè | 16.0 | 42.0 | 33.0 | 9.0 | 0.0 | 9.0 |
| 18 Oct 2017 | Keix | 24.2 | 33.0 | 33.2 | 7.6 | 1.6 | 0.2 |
| 12 Ott 2017 | Demopolis | 22.0 | 35.0 | 33.0 | 9.0 | 1.0 | 2.0 |
| 11 Oct 2017 | Piepoli | 16.0 | 42.0 | 33.0 | 9.0 | 1.0 | 9.0 |
| 5 Oct 2017 | Index research | 20.0 | 37.0 | 30.0 | 10.0 | 3.0 | 7.0 |
| 4 Oct 2017 | Demopolis | 22.5 | 34.5 | 32.0 | 9.0 | 2.0 | 2.5 |
| 3 Oct 2017 | Tecnè | 15.0 | 37.0 | 31.0 | 11.0 | 6.0 | 6.0 |
| 24 Sep 2017 | Ipsos | 13.0 | 38.0 | 31.0 | 10.0 | 8.0 | 7.0 |
| 21 Sep 2017 | Index Research | 15.0 | 36.0 | 30.0 | 16.0 | 3.0 | 6.0 |
| 5 Sep 2017 | Demopolis | 22.0 | 34.0 | 35.0 | 6.0 | 3.0 | 1.0 |
| 29–30 Aug 2017 | Euromedia | 16.0 | 36.1 | 33.0 | 9.5 | 7.5 | 3.1 |
| 26–28 Aug 2017 | Lorien | 21.3 | 40.5 | 38.2 | —N/a | 0.0 | 2.3 |

== Results ==
5 November 2017 Sicilian regional election results
| Candidates | Votes | % | Seats | Parties | Votes | % | Seats |
|---|---|---|---|---|---|---|---|
| Nello Musumeci | 830,821 | 39.85 | 7 | | | | |
| Nello Musumeci | 830,821 | 39.85 | 7 | Forza Italia | 315,056 | 16.37 | 12 |
| Nello Musumeci | 830,821 | 39.85 | 7 | Populars and Autonomists | 136,520 | 7.09 | 5 |
| Nello Musumeci | 830,821 | 39.85 | 7 | Union of the Centre | 134,124 | 6.97 | 5 |
| Nello Musumeci | 830,821 | 39.85 | 7 | Diventerà Bellissima | 114,708 | 5.96 | 4 |
| Nello Musumeci | 830,821 | 39.85 | 7 | Brothers of Italy – Us with Salvini | 108,713 | 5.65 | 3 |
| Nello Musumeci | 830,821 | 39.85 | 7 | Total | 809,121 | 42.04 | 29 |
| Giancarlo Cancelleri | 722,555 | 34.65 | 1 | Five Star Movement | 513,359 | 26.67 | 19 |
| Fabrizio Micari | 388,886 | 18.65 | – | | | | |
| Fabrizio Micari | 388,886 | 18.65 | – | Democratic Party | 250,633 | 13.02 | 11 |
| Fabrizio Micari | 388,886 | 18.65 | – | Future Sicily – Italian Socialist Party | 115,751 | 6.01 | 2 |
| Fabrizio Micari | 388,886 | 18.65 | – | Popular Alternative – Centrists for Micari | 80,366 | 4.18 | – |
| Fabrizio Micari | 388,886 | 18.65 | – | Micari for President | 42,189 | 2.19 | – |
| Fabrizio Micari | 388,886 | 18.65 | – | Total | 488,939 | 25.41 | 13 |
| Claudio Fava | 128,157 | 6.15 | – | One Hundred Steps for Sicily | 100,583 | 5.23 | 1 |
| Roberto La Rosa | 14,656 | 0.70 | – | Free Sicilians | 12,600 | 0.66 | – |
| Total candidates | 2,085,075 | 100.00 | 8 | Total parties | 1,924,602 | 100.00 | 62 |
Source: Sicilian Region

Popular vote
| M5S | 26.67% |
| FI | 16.37% |
| PD | 13.02% |
| CP–MpA | 7.09% |
| UdC | 6.97% |
| SF–PSI | 6.01% |
| DB | 5.96% |
| FdI–NcS | 5.65% |
| CPpS | 5.23% |
| AP–CpM | 4.18% |
| MP | 2.19% |
| SL | 0.66% |

President
| Musumeci | 39.85% |
| Cancelleri | 34.65% |
| Micari | 18.65% |
| Fava | 6.15% |
| La Rosa | 0.70% |
