= Giuseppe Maria Reina =

Italian politician (1954–2025)

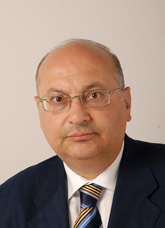
- Reina in 2006

Member of the Chamber of Deputies
- In office 28 April 2006 – 28 April 2008

Personal details
- Born: 23 October 1954 Catania, Sicily, Italy
- Died: 17 September 2025 (aged 70) Catania, Sicily, Italy
- Party: Movement for Autonomy (from 2005)
- Other political affiliations: Christian Democracy (until 1994); UDC (2002–2005)
- Profession: Politician

Giuseppe Maria Reina (23 October 1954 – 17 September 2025) was an Italian politician. He served in various local offices in his home city of Catania before being elected to the Italian Chamber of Deputies in the 2006 Italian general election. He lost re-election in 2008 and left national politics in 2010.

== Life and career ==
Giuseppe Maria Reina was born on 23 October 1954 in the comune of Misterbianco, Catania in Sicily.

Reina was a long-term member of Christian Democracy during the First Italian Republic; during the Second Italian Republic, he became a part of the UDC. He served as municipal assessor and councilor of Misterbianco and as provincial assessor and councilor of the Province of Catania. He was also a member of the board of directors of the University of Catania, the board of directors of the Chamber of Commerce of Catania, and the sole director of the company SAC Service Srl, a public company that provides services to Catania–Fontanarossa Airport. He additionally served on the Technical Commission established by the Sicilian Regional Assembly (ARS) that drafted the bill that implemented reforms of the Sicilian Chamber of Commerce. He was a part of the administration for the company Interporto Catania SpA and was a lecturer at Catania's Institute for Training and Research on Social Problems of Development.

In the 2006 Italian elections, he was elected to the Chamber of Deputies among the ranks of the Northern League–Movement for Autonomy list. He represented Apulia. After his election, he served as Secretary General of Giorgio Napolitano, President of Italy from 30 May onwards; additionally, he was a member of the parliamentary finance committee and the Committee for External Communication and Information from June 2006 onwards. In the 2008 Italian elections however, he was not re-elected, however on 12 May, he was appointed Undersecretary for Infrastructure and Transport in the Berlusconi IV Cabinet, with responsibility focusing on the Messina Strait Bridge.

As a member of the Movement for Autonomy group, he had held the positions of Secretary to the Presidency and member of the Finance Committee in Montecitorio.

On 15 November 2010, after the Movement for Autonomy left the governing coalition with PdL and the Northern League, Reina resigned as undersecretary. In 2017, he was the regional coordinator of the MPA and subsequently became the provincial political coordinator of Catania. Reina died on 17 September 2025, at the age of 70.
