= Cozzo Busonè =

Archaeological site in Italy

Coordinates: 37.3752°N 13.5308°E

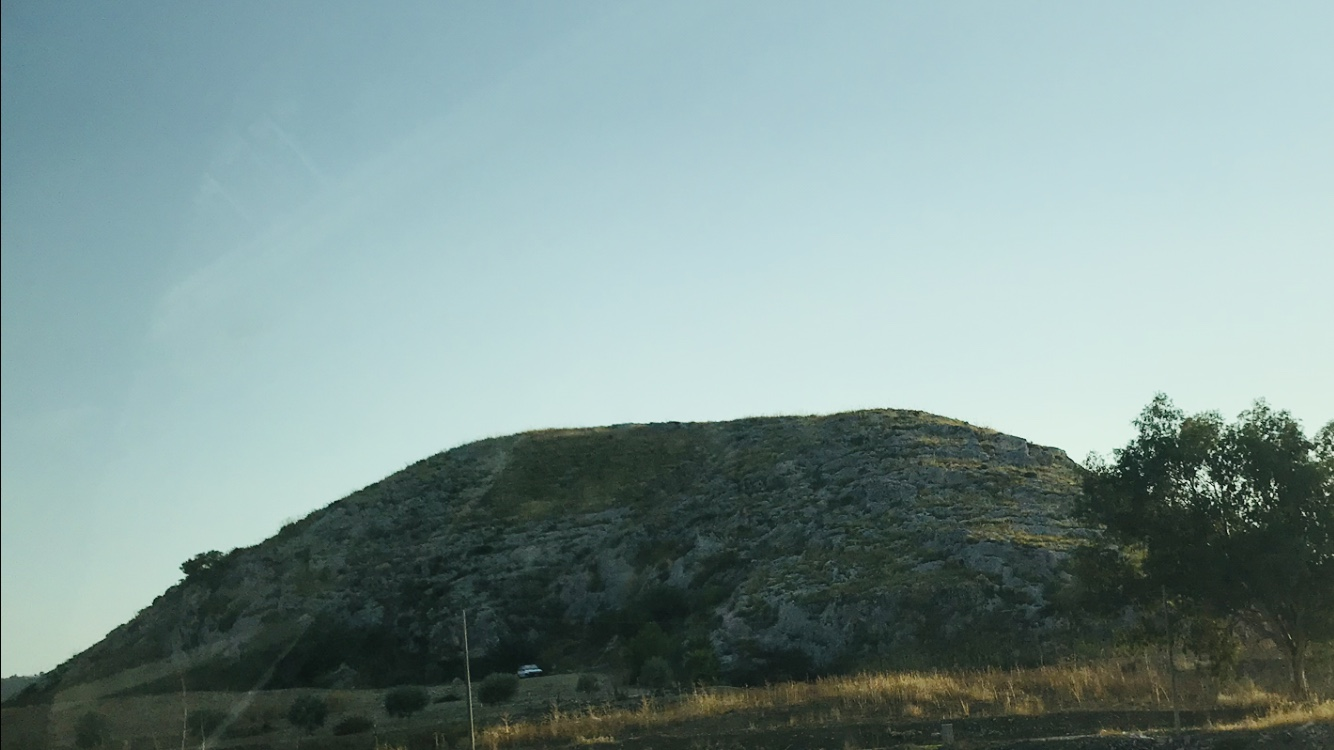

Cozzo Busonè is a hill located in Raffadali, Agrigento, inside which were found the Venuses of Busonè, two female statuettes of the Copper Age, now on display at the Regional Archaeological Museum of Agrigento. It was also the oldest human settlement of Raffadali and a necropolis.

The hill has oven tombs and two chamber tombs with stone and ceramic objects from the Chalcolithic period; archaeological excavations in them from 1967 onwards revealed the Venus figurines of Busonè.
