= Giuseppe Zamberletti =

Italian politician (1933–2019)

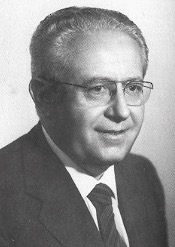

Minister for Civil Protection Coordination
- In office 26 March 1984 – 18 April 1987
- Prime Minister: Bettino Craxi
- Preceded by: Vincenzo Scotti
- Succeeded by: Remo Gaspari
- In office 28 June 1981 – 1 December 1982
- Prime Minister: Giovanni Spadolini
- Preceded by: Office established
- Succeeded by: Loris Fortuna

Personal details
- Born: 17 December 1933 Varese, Italy
- Died: 26 January 2019 (aged 85) Varese, Italy
- Occupation: Politician

Giuseppe Zamberletti (17 December 1933 – 26 January 2019) was an Italian politician and one of the founders of Italy's Protezione Civile (Civil Protection), of which he was the first minister in Italy from 1981.

== Biography ==
Zamberletti was born in Varese, Lombardy.

A member of Christian Democracy (Italian: Democrazia Cristiana, or DC), he was elected for the first time to the Italian Chamber of Deputies in 1968. After his re-election in 1972, he became undersecretary for Interior Affairs in the Moro IV, Moro V and Andreotti III governments, with responsibility for public security, the Vigili del Fuoco (Firemen Corps) and Civil Protection. In the Cossiga I and II Cabinets.

Due to his role as national coordinator of rescue interventions, Zamberletti was in charge in Italian emergencies such as the 1976 Friuli and 1980 Irpinia earthquakes. He was involved in the case raised by the Italian Parliament's Investigation committee for the illegal use of funds during the 1980 earthquake In the summer 1979 he organized the rescue of Vietnamese refugees from North Vietnam, an operation which was carried on by cruisers Andrea Doria, Vittorio Veneto and the support ship Vesuvio.

Zamberletti was the first Italian Minister of Civil Protection starting from 1982 (Spadolini I and II Cabinets), a position he held also under the two following Bettino Craxi-led cabinets. In the Forlani cabinet he was Minister of Public Works. In 1992 he was elected to the Italian Senate. From 2004–2009 he was president of the Confederation of Italian Entrepreneurs Worldwide.
