= Raffadali =

- Comune
- Comune di Raffadali
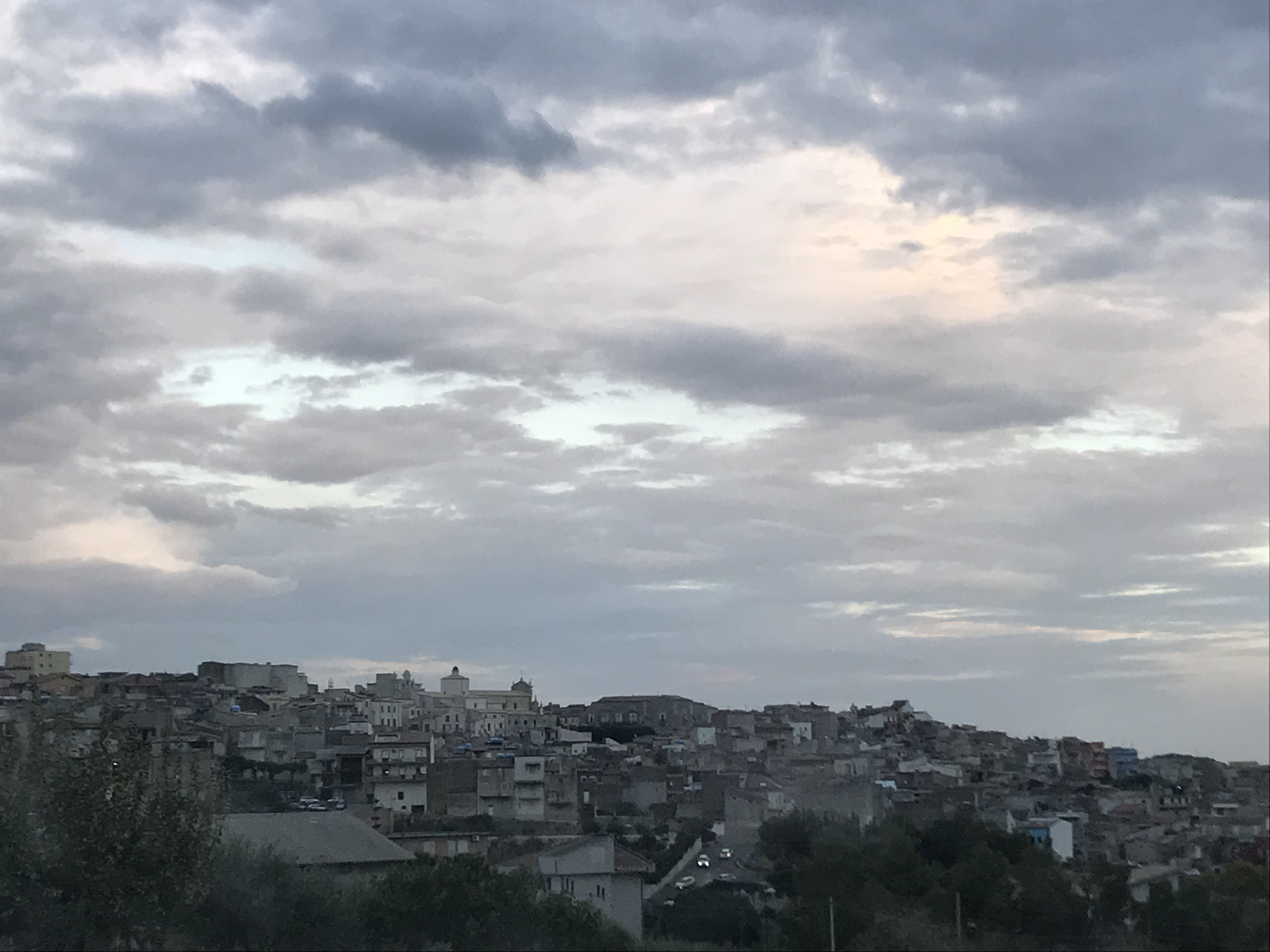
- View of Raffadali

- Coat of arms

- Location within Italy Location within Sicily
- Coordinates: 37°24′17″N 13°32′2″E
- Country: Italy
- Region: Sicily
- Province: Agrigento (AG)

Government
  - Mayor: Silvio Marcello Cuffaro

Area
  - Total: 22.2 km^{2} (8.6 sq mi)
- Elevation: 420 m (1,380 ft)

Population (30 November 2016)
  - Total: 12,762
  - Density: 575/km^{2} (1,490/sq mi)
- Demonym: Raffadalesi
- Time zone: UTC+1 (CET)
  - Summer (DST): UTC+2 (CEST)
- Postal code: 92015
- Dialing code: 0922

Raffadali is a comune (municipality) in the Province of Agrigento in the Italian region of Sicily, located about 80 kilometres (50 mi) south of Palermo and about 10 kilometres (6 mi) northwest of Agrigento.

== Geography ==
The commune's territory covers an area of around 1.617 hectares and has a population density of 586.12 inhabitants per km². It is a hilly region between the rivers Platani and Salso, located 425 m above sea level.

The physical aspect of the area is characterised by white marl and brown soils and regosols.

The area was classified as seismic zone 2 (medium-high) in the Italian earthquake risk classification system, by Prime Ministerial ordinance 3274 (20/03/2003).

The area's climate is of the Mediterranean type, with an average temperature of 26-28 °C and highs of 30-40 °C in July and August. The Italian government classifies the climate as zone C, 1177 degree days.

The old heart of the city consists of a thick network of narrow streets with traditional stone and plaster houses, accessed exclusively through the first floor by means of steep external stairs. At the centre of this area are the castle and the church. Since the beginning of the twentieth century, the hub of the town has been the via Nazionale, where the municipal buildings, the church, the castle and the library are located. This street is also home to numerous commercial and professional offices.

== History ==
=== Prehistory ===
The territory offers extremely interesting evidence for prehistory. The oldest archaeological discoveries date to the Chalcolithic period (4000 BC), and were discovered in the area called Pietra Rossa, where there is a necropolis containing dozens of skeletons in the fetal position, with large amounts of coarse pottery as grave goods – indicating a population focussed on agriculture and stock raising. Another archaeological site near Raffadali is Cozzo Busonè, located by the SS.118. This necropolis consists of several tombs in an artificial cave; 12 of these were destroyed by quarrying to produce lime. The archaeologist Bianchini was the first to conduct excavations on the site and to discover the existence of the tombs, which range from simple niches for a single individual to entire circular rooms for whole families. The pottery and stone objects are characteristic of the Castelluccio Culture (1800-1400 BC). Among the most significant discoveries are two female figurines, the so-called Venuses of Busonè. There are also traces of a prehistoric necropolis near Mount Palombara, with some bones cemented inside a thick crystalline structure.

=== Greek, Roman and Byzantine periods ===
In the Greek period, there were probably a large number of farmhouses in the area of modern Raffadali. The ancient city of Pitiniana is thought to have been nearby. There is evidence for a Roman presence at the site of Terravecchia. According to Picone, the place may have been the site of the ancient settlement of Herbessus, whose location is not certainly known; the remains of structures provide some evidence for this theory. Among the more important discoveries from this period are the Raffadali Sarcophagus, which depicts the Rape of Persephone and was discovered in the sixteenth century in Grotticelle, where there is other evidence for Roman presence. This was initially in the possession of the princes of Montaperto and subsequently donated to the main church of the town, where it remains to this day. There is also a relief depicting the Vestal virgins, showing priestesses carrying out a sacrifice, in the presence of a male figure wearing a toga. At Grotticelle there is a Byzantine necropolis, with many tombs of local Christians.

=== Arab and Norman age ===
In 839 or 840, Raffadali was occupied by the Arabs, who introduced new crops, such as apricots, pears, pistachio, citrus fruits, and carob, as well as new farming techniques and a system of canals to irrigate the fields. One etymology for the town's name derives it from the Arabic Raḥl ʾAfḍal (رحل أفضل), meaning "excellent village". Two centuries later, the Norman Conquest put an end to Arab rule. Raffadali became part of the territory of the Diocese of Agrigento, which contained 54 communes, required to pay an annual tithe to the church. In this period, Raffadali was incorporated into a territorial and administrative form typical of feudalism. On 7 October 1095, King Roger I granted the territory of Raffadali to Giorlando Montaperto, son of Giovanni Matteo and Ulla Cassaneto, as a reward for having captured the nearby castle at Monte Guastanella from an Arabic garrison led by a man named Ali. He thus become lord of the castle and of the raffa, that is, the surrounding territory. A popular etymology for the name of the Raffadali thus attributes it to the combination of raffa and Ali. The town is first recorded in the registers of the diocese of Agrigento in 1117, where it is listed as Cattà (the name Raafala is also found in the records). In the 14th century, the village had its own parish church dedicated to St. Leonard, which is now in ruins.

=== Modern era ===
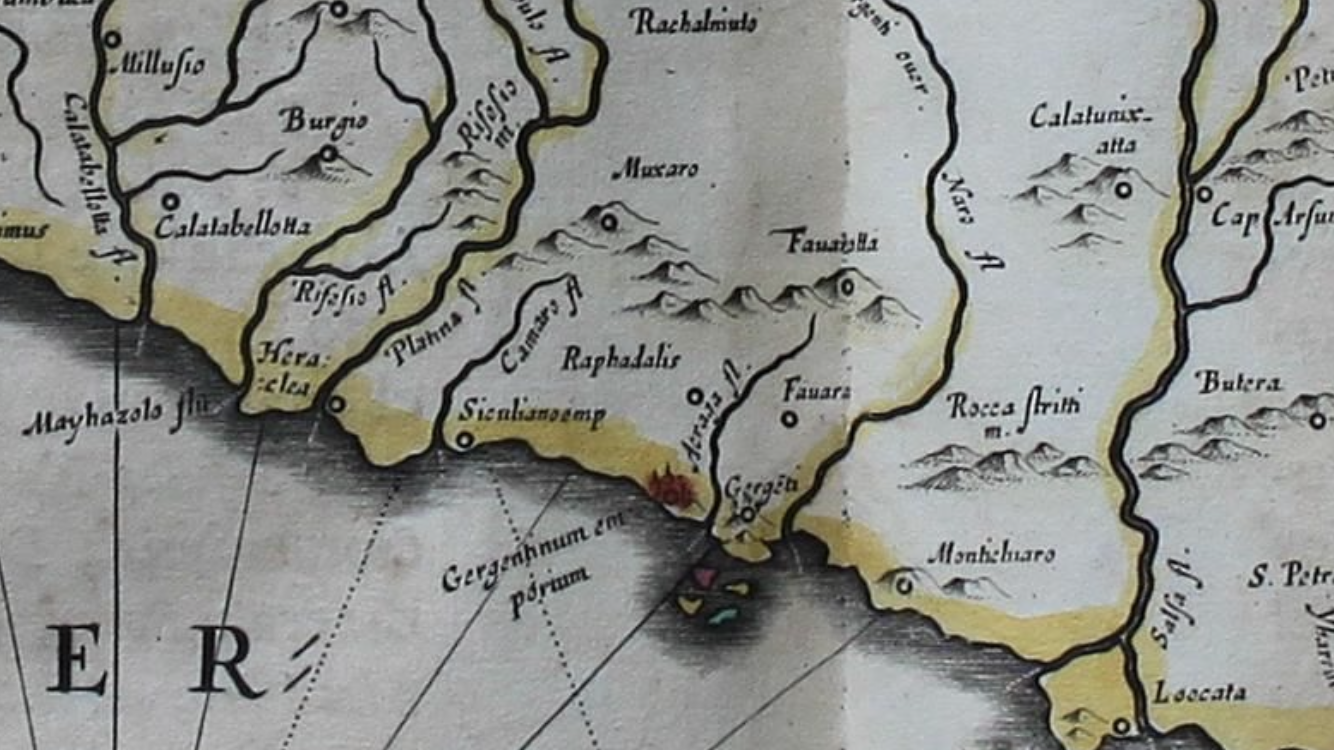
An old map

The modern town was founded on the ruins of the old manor house in 1481. In 1507, Pietro Montaperto obtained the ius populandi (right to populate) from Ferdinand II, which enabled the expansion of the settlement and he began work renovating the castle and constructing a parish church, the Church of St. Oliva.

In 1649, Giuseppe Nicolò Montaperto intervened to quell a riot of the Agrigentines against Bishop Trajna, who had been blamed for a famine. As a reward for his courage and loyalty, Philip IV granted the Montaperto family the title of Prince of Raffadali. The last prince was Salvatore Montaperto Valguarnera.

At the beginning of the nineteenth century, Raffadali was transformed from the seat of a feudal principality to a rural town of small and medium-scale farmers. The old lords retained the right of emphyteusis over parts of the territory.

From 1861, Raffadali was the capital of its own Mandamento, which also contained the towns of Santa Elisabetta and Joppolo Giancaxio. it was suppressed, along with all the other mandamenti, in 1927.

== Economy ==
The main economic activities are linked to agriculture, especially the production of grain, grapes, almonds, pistachios, and olives. Cows and sheep are also raised. Over the last fifty years a tertiary sector has begun to develop.

Alongside the agricultural activities, there is some industry associated with the production of olive oil, wine and preserves. These industries have arisen out of the local agricultural specialties (tomatoes, potatoes, watermelon, table grapes, pears, and figs).

== Main sights ==
=== Religious architecture ===
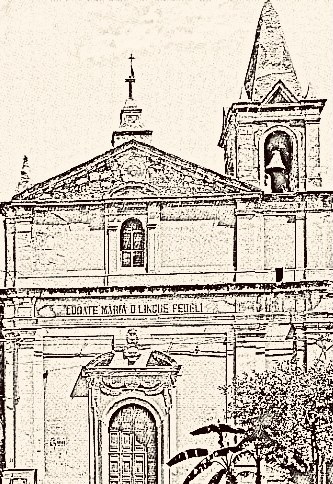
The church of St Oliva

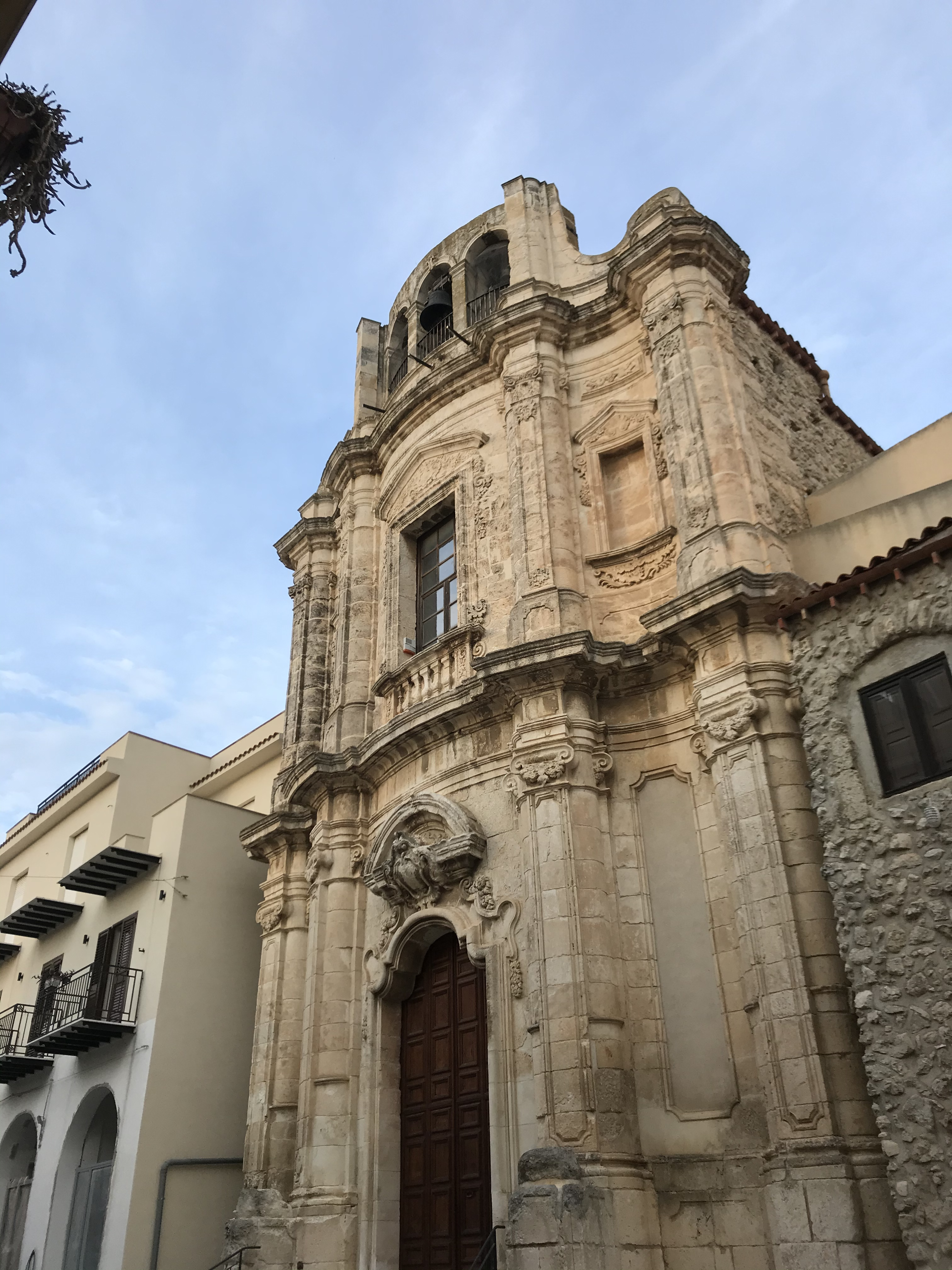
The church of St Joseph

- Church of St. Oliva, at the centre of the town, built in stages from 1507 and dedicated to the Madonna of the Sick, and then re-dedicated to Saint Olivia in 1608, after an older church of St Olivia went out of use. The church contains the Raffadali Sarcophagus depicting the Rape of Persephone and a sixteenth-century wooden statue of Holy Mary of the Sick with Child.
- Church of St Joseph, with an eighteenth-century facade and a nineteenth-century facade attributed to the architect Saverio Bentivegna. Formerly there was a convent of Collegine Nuns next to it.
- Church of St Giacinto Giordano Ansalone.
- Church of Mary of the Rosary (Dominican monastery until 1540).
- Church of St John
- Church of Our Lady of Mount Carmel
- Church of the Holy Cross
- Church of St Anthony the Abbot
- Church of St Anthony of Padua (Monastery of the Minor brothers until 1535)
- Church of the Madonna of the Chain
- Church of the Madonna of Piety
- Oratory of the confraternity of the Holy Sacrament

In Raffadali there were five small chapels, located in each district of the town; all except for the Chapel of Piety in the central district are now in ruins.

There are also two Aediculae dedicated to the Madonna with Child located on via Porta Agrigento and via Porta Palermo.

=== Others ===
- Palazzo Principe, the former residence of the Princes of Montaperto. Built in the 16th century, it subsequently lost three of its towers and its crenelations.
- Palazzo di Città, seat of the government of the comune of Raffadali.
- Arab fortress of Bugami, located near Buaggimi.

Four monuments decorate the piazze and streets of Raffadali:

- The Monument to the Fallen in all the Wars, dedicated in 1924 and located in front of the church of St Oliva,
- The Monument to Francesco Spoto, located beside the via Nazionale,
- The Monument to the Workers' and Farmers' Movement, located on the Piano Progresso, near the Palazzo Principe,
- The Monument to Cesare Sessa, dedicated in 2007 and located in the piazza of the same name.
- A bas-relief in memorial of Salvatore Di Benedetto, dedicated in 2006 and located in the Civic Theatre of Raffadali.

There are three public fountains in Raffadali: one in Piano Progresso which is the most recent and is purely decorative; another is located on via Porta Palermo, is about 300 years old and was used until quite recently for watering animals; the last is on one of the streets leading to Joppolo Giancaxio and has a similar function to the preceding.

=== Archaeological sites ===
- Cozzo Busonè: oven tombs and two chamber tombs with stone and ceramic objects. These are Chalcolithic tombs and archaeological excavations in them from 1967 onwards revealed the Venus figurines of Busonè which are now on display in the Museo archeologico regionale di Agrigento. According to an Arab legend, the mountain opens up every seven years to reveal treasures hidden inside it.
- Cozzo Pietrarossa: necropolis with oven tombs dating to 4000 BC.
- Mount Palombara: cave with ceramic fragments of the Castelluccio culture.
- Contrada Torrevecchia: Remains of a settlement (ceramic fragments, millstones, lamps, jewelry) which have been identified with the Statio pitiniana which appears in the Antonine Itinerary, nine Roman miles from Agrigento.
- Grotticelle: Late Roman and Byzantine necropolis (3rd-4th century AD) with arcosolium tombs cut from living rock by locals; the Raffadali sarcophagus depicting the Rape of Persephone came from this necropolis.
- Monte Guastanella: Necropolis and remains of an Arab castle, in which Bishop Ursone of Agrigento was once imprisoned and which was destroyed by Frederick II between 1221 and 1232.

== Transportation ==
Transport is mainly provided by crosscountry bus services, with a terminal on the via Nazionale. There are direct services to Palermo, Agrigento, Trapani, Sciacca, and nearby towns. Transport within the town is by car. The S.118 highway, running from Bolognetta to Agrigento, passes through the town.

== Sport ==
There is a soccer team ("FCD Raffadali Calcio"), established in 1990. It plays in the Eccellenza league (fifth division).

There is a tennis club ("ASD Tennis club Raffadali"), established in 1995.

There is also a group of Enduro practitioners, who established the ASD Enduristi del Platani - Black Wolf society in 2012. This is affiliated with the Italian National Olympic Committee and the AICS - Associazione Italiana Cultura e Sport.

== People ==
- Cesare Sessa, unionist and politician
- Francesco Spoto, Christian missionary
- Salvatore Di Benedetto, resistance fighter and politician
- Vittoria Giunti, resistance fighter and unionist
- Salvatore Cuffaro, former Regional President
- Tinturia, musical group
- Giuseppe Serroy, doctor and poet
- Dario Lo Bosco, businessman
- Nino Randisi, journalist, secretary of the Autonomous National Union of Italian Journalists

== Sources ==
- Librici Alfio, Vincenzo (1990). Raffadali, aspetti geo-socioeconomici. Pezzini.[ISBN unspecified]
- Cufaro, Domenico (2010). Feste religiose a Raffadali. Milano.[ISBN unspecified]
