= Diventerà Bellissima =

Italian political party

#DiventeràBellissima
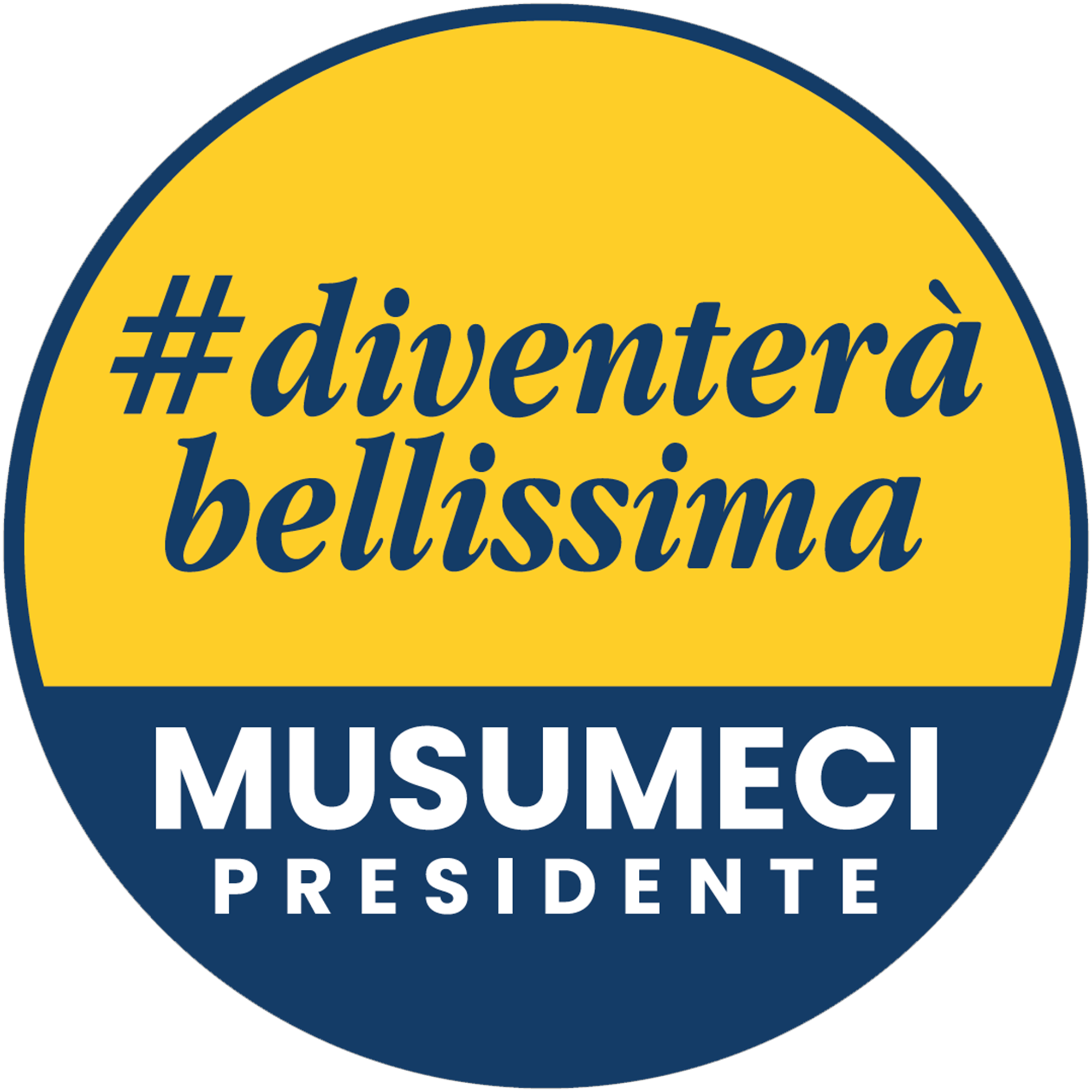
- President: Nello Musumeci
- Founded: November 2014; 11 years ago
- Dissolved: 2022
- Merged into: Brothers of Italy
- Headquarters: Via Caronda, 4; 95129 Catania
- Ideology: Regionalism; Autonomism; Conservatism; Meridionalism
- Political position: Right-wing
- National affiliation: Political party: Brothers of Italy; Coalition: Centre-right coalition
- Colors: Blue Gold

Website
- www.diventerabellissima.it

Diventerà Bellissima (Note: also written as #DiventeràBellissima) (lit. "[Sicily] Will Become Very Beautiful") was a regionalist and conservative political party active in Sicily, Italy. The party was led by Nello Musumeci, the former President of Sicily and current Minister for Civil Protection and Marine Policies, who is also affiliated to Brothers of Italy.

The party's name was inspired by a statement about Sicily of Paolo Borsellino, an Italian judge and prosecuting magistrate killed by the Mafia in 1992.

== History ==
Diventerà Bellissima was founded in November 2014 by Nello Musumeci, former MEP and President of Catania Province, and Fabio Granata, former Vice President of Sicily.

In the 2017 Sicilian regional election, the party won 6.0% of the vote and 6 seats in the Regional Assembly, contributing to elect Musumeci at the head of the regional government. Few months later, on 18 December, DB had its constituent congress in Palermo, in which Nello Musumeci was elected president and Raffaele Stancanelli, coordinator.

The party run in the 2018 general election within Brothers of Italy (FdI), a national conservative party led by Giorgia Meloni. In the election, Stancanelli succeeded in being elected in the Senate, thus he left his role as coordinator. On 24 February 2019, he was replaced by Gino Ioppolo during the second party's congress.

Following the 2022 elections, the party de facto ceased its activities, and its elected representatives continued their political work with Brothers of Italy. Musumeci became minister of the Meloni Cabinet.

== Electoral results ==
=== Italian Parliament ===
Election	Leader	Chamber of Deputies				Senate of the Republic			
Election	Leader	Votes	%	Seats	+/–	Votes	%	Seats	+/–
2018	Nello Musumeci	Into FdI		0 / 630	New	Into FdI		1 / 315	New
2022	Nello Musumeci	Into FdI		0 / 400	0	Into FdI		1 / 200	0

=== Regional elections ===
Election	Leader	Votes	%	Seats	+/−
2017	Nello Musumeci	114,708 (6th)	5.96	6 / 70	–
2022	Nello Musumeci	Into FdI		5 / 70	▼1

== Leadership ==
- President: Nello Musumeci (2014–2022)
- Coordinator: Alessandro Aricò / Giusy Savarino / Ruggero Razza (2015–2017), Raffaele Stancanelli (2017–2018), Giuseppe Catania / Giovanna Candura / Enrico Trantino (2018-2019), Gino Ioppolo (2019–2021), Alessandro Aricò / Giorgio Assenza / Giusy Savarino (2021–2022)
