= Ferdinando Latteri =

Ferdinando Latteri in 2006.

Ferdinando Latteri (11 May, 1945 - 14 July, 2011) was an Italian politician, racing driver, physician and scholar.

== Biography ==
Ferdinando Latteri was born on 11 May, 1945 in Palermo, Sicily. His father was a surgeon and a member of the faculty at the University of Cagliari, the University of Modena and Reggio Emilia, the University of Messina and the University of Palermo.

Latteri followed in his father's footsteps, practicing medicine after graduating from the University of Catania. He also eventually returned to teach at the school, including as a rector from 2000 to 2006.

Additionally, Latteri was a high-ranking official in the Italian Red Cross and President of the Italian Private Hospital Association. He died on 14 July, 2011 in Catania.

== Racing career ==
During the 1960s and 1970s, Latteri competed in the World Sportscar Championship, hillclimbing and other motorsporting events. Among the teams he drove for was the North American Racing Team.

Latteri won three top-level races over the course of his career. He participated in the Targa Florio several times, with his best finish of 8th place coming in 1966. Other notable races he appeared at included the Norisring 200 Miles and the 1,000 Kilometres of Monza.

== Political career ==
In 1987 and 1992, Latteri was elected to the Italian Chamber of Deputies with Christian Democracy from Sicily 1. As a candidate of the Italian People's Party, he was defeated for re-election in 1994.

A decade later, Latteri unsuccessfully sought a seat in the European Parliament from the Italian Islands with The Olive Tree. In 2005, he was a candidate for the nomination of The Union to become President of Sicily, but was again unsuccessful.

The following year, Latteri won a return to the Chamber of Deputies from Sicily 2 as an Olive Tree nominee. After joining the Chamber, he later joined the Democratic Party and the Movement for Autonomy. Latteri was re-elected to the Chamber in 2008 and remained a member until his death.
