= Giuseppe Castiglione (politician) =

Italian politician (born 1963)

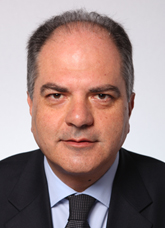

President of the Province of Catania
- In office 17 June 2008 – 31 October 2012
- Preceded by: Raffaele Lombardo
- Succeeded by: Antonella Liotta (commissioner)

MEP
- In office 2004–2009
- Constituency: Islands

Member of the Chamber of Deputies
- In office 15 March 2013 – 22 March 2018
- Constituency: Sicilia 2

Personal details
- Born: 5 October 1963 Bronte, Sicily, Italy
- Party: DC (until 1994); CDU (1995–1999); UDEUR (1999–2000); FI (2000–2009); PdL (2009–2013); NCD (2013–2017); AP (2017–2018); FI (2018–2022; since 2024); Action (2022–2024)
- Website: GiuseppeCastiglione.it

Giuseppe Castiglione (born 5 October 1963) is an Italian politician. He is the son-in-law of the politician and journalist Giuseppe Firrarello.

== Biography ==
He has been a member of the Management Committee of the USL 39 - Bronte (1984–89) and President of the USL Guarantors Committee 39.

He was a municipal councilor of Bronte from 1989 to 1992 for the Christian Democracy, and in 1996 he was elected to the Sicilian Regional Assembly with the United Christian Democrats, with 8,487 votes of preference. He served as regional Assessor for Industry of the Sicilian Region from 1996 to 2000, initially in the centre-right governments led by Provenzano (1996–98) and Drago (1998), later in the centre-left governments led by Capodicasa (1998-2000). In 1998 he joined the Union of Democrats for Europe; subsequently, in 2000, he joined Forza Italia.

On 24 June 2001, he was re-elected to the ARS on the Forza Italia list with 18,087 votes, the most voted candidate in that election. He was appointed Vice President of the Sicilian Region and regional Assessor for Agriculture in the Cuffaro government, until 2004.

He has been National Vice President of AICCRE (Italian Association of Municipalities and Regions of Europe) and member of the World Council of CGLU (United Cities and Local Governments)".

In 2004 he was elected MEP in the Italian Islands constituency and resigned from the ARS. He joined the European People's Party group and sat in the Commission for Agriculture and Rural Development, of the Commission on Civil Freedoms, Justice and Home Affairs and of the Delegation for relations with the Maghreb countries and the Arab Maghreb Union (including Libya); he was also substitute member of the Subcommittee on Human Rights and of the Delegation for relations with the People's Republic of China. In those years he was Forza Italia's spokesperson at the European Parliament and regional deputy coordinator of Forza Italia in Sicily.

In 2008 he was elected President of the Province of Catania. In April 2009 he was appointed regional coordinator of the PdL in Sicily, together with Domenico Nania. He was elected president of UPI (Union of Italian Provinces) on 11 December 2009. On 10 November 2010 he was elected President of the European association of provinces, or rather of the CEPLI (European Confederation of Local Intermediate Authorities) institute.

On 31 October 2012 he resigned as President of the Province of Catania to be able to stand as a candidate in the 2013 general elections, in which he was later elected to the Chamber of Deputies. With his resignation from the Presidency of the Province he also left the Presidency of UPI and CEPLI.

In May 2013 he was appointed Undersecretary of State to the Ministry of Agricultural, Food and Forestry Policies in the Letta government.

On 16 November 2013 he joined the New Centre-Right, led by Minister of Interior Angelino Alfano, of which he became regional coordinator for Sicily.

He was reconfirmed Undersecretary for agricultural policies also in the Renzi and Gentiloni governments.

== Judicial proceedings ==
Investigated in 1998 for auction disruption as part of the investigation for bribes at the Garibaldi Hospital in Catania, in 1999 he was sentenced to ten months in prison (at first degree), together with his father-in-law and Senator of Forza Italia Giuseppe Firrarello, (definitively sentenced to two years' imprisonment for corruption and auction disruption in the same investigation). He was also accused of external involvement in a mafia association, an accusation from which he was acquitted during the same trial.

On 12 November 2004 Castiglione was acquitted on appeal of the accusation of disruption of the auction, because the fact did not exist.

The appeal sentence, although challenged by the Attorney General, was confirmed by the Supreme Court of Cassation Sect. I n. 1161 of 11/11/2005 which definitively acquitted him. For the Senator of Forza Italia Giuseppe Firrarello the Court of Cassation, on 25 February 2014, declared the annulment of the condemnation for disruption of the auction for having committed the crime prescribed in the period prior to the first degree sentence.

In June 2015 he was investigated together with 5 other people for auction disruption in the investigation of the Catania Public Prosecutor's Office on the contract for the management of the C.A.R.A. of Mineo.

On the 23rd of that same month, the Chamber discussed 3 motions presented by the opposition against Castiglione. Those of Left Ecology Freedom and Northern League committed the government to invite Castiglione to resign as Undersecretary of State, while the one from the Five Star Movement committed the government to revoke his office. All three motions were rejected.
