= Francesco Spoto =

Italian Catholic priest

Blessed Francesco Spoto M.S.P.T.M.

Martyr
- Born: 8 July 1924; Raffadali, Province of Agrigento, Kingdom of Italy
- Died: 27 December 1964 (aged 40); Erira, Orientale, Democratic Republic of the Congo
- Venerated in: Roman Catholic Church
- Beatified: 27 April 2007, Palermo Cathedral, Italy by Cardinal Salvatore De Giorgi
- Feast: 27 December
- Patronage: Missionaries

Francesco Spoto (8 July 1924 – 27 December 1964) was an Italian Catholic priest who served in the missions in the Democratic Republic of Congo and was killed there. He was also a professed member from the Missionary Servants of the Poor.

His beatification was celebrated in Palermo on 21 April 2007 after Pope Benedict XVI approved the fact that the priest had been killed "in odium fidei" – in hatred of the faith. Cardinal Salvatore De Giorgi presided over the celebration on the behalf of the pope.

== Life ==
Francesco Spoto was born in Raffadali in mid-1924 and he was baptized on 24 September 1924. His cousin was a priest.

Spoto commenced his studies for the priesthood in Palermo in 1936 and he later became a professed member of the Missionary Servants of the Poor. He received his ordination to the priesthood from Cardinal Ernesto Ruffini in the Palermo Cathedral on 22 July 1951. Father Spoto was later elected as the Superior General of his order at its General Chapter in 1959 in a move that surprised him and he later wrote of his shock to a priest cousin. Sporo – in his role as the Superior General – made the petition to see the introduction of the cause for canonization of the order's founder Giacomo Cusmano. He also re-vitalized the order and encouraged vocations.

On 4 August 1964 he travelled to Biringi to visit the missions in the Democratic Republic of Congo. On 3 December 1964 the Simba rebels captured him along with four other missionaries and on 11 December was beaten and tortured until he managed to escape barefoot though later collapsed due to exhaustion; he forgave his killers and offered his life to God. He died due to his injuries on 27 December 1964 after Christmas; the other four missionaries were saved at some stage. His remains were later moved to Palermo on 14 October 1984.

== Beatification ==
The beatification process opened on 5 June 1992 after he was titled as a Servant of God and the Congregation for the Causes of Saints issued the official "nihil obstat" to the cause. The diocesan process spanned from 16 December 1992 until 18 March 1996 and received C.C.S. validation on 20 December 1996 in Rome. The postulation submitted the Positio to Roman officials in 1998.

The board of theologians approved the cause on 4 October 2005 while the cardinal and bishop members of the C.C.S. likewise approved it on 4 April 2006. Pope Benedict XVI approved the beatification on 26 June 2006 and delegated Cardinal Salvatore De Giorgi to preside over the celebration in the Palermo Cathedral on 21 April 2007. In attendance was the then-Archbishop (now Cardinal) Paolo Romeo and Bishop Marcel Utembi Tapa – of the diocese where Spoto was killed. His beatification was also the first to occur in Palermo. His liturgical feast was affixed to 24 September – the date of his baptism – instead of the date of his death as is the norm.

The current postulator for the cause is Bishop Vincenzo Bertolone.
