= Minister for Civil Protection and Maritime Policies =

- Ministro per la protezione civile e le politiche del mare

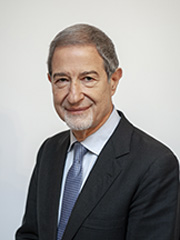
- Incumbent; Nello Musumeci since October 22, 2022
- Department for Civil Protection
- Member of: Council of Ministers
- Seat: Rome
- Appointer: The president of Italy
- Term length: No fixed term
- Formation: June 28, 1981; 45 years ago
- First holder: Giuseppe Zamberletti
- Website: www.protezionecivile.gov.it

The minister for civil protection and maritime policies (Italian: ministro per la protezione civile e le politiche del mare) is one of the positions in the Italian government. The minister coordinates the relations between the government and Italian Civil Protection.

The current minister is Nello Musumeci, a member of the Brothers of Italy, who held the office since 22 October 2022 in the cabinet of Giorgia Meloni. The first and longest-serving minister was Giuseppe Zamberletti, widely considered as the founder of Italian Civil Protection.

== List of ministers ==
Parties

- 1981–1994:
  - Christian Democracy
  - Italian Socialist Party
  - Italian Democratic Socialist Party
- 1994–present:
  - Italian People's Party
  - Democratic Party of the Left
  - The Democrats
  - Brothers of Italy

Coalitions:

- 1981–1994:
  - Centrist coalition
  - Organic centre-left
  - Pentapartito / Quadripartito
  - Mixed coalition
- 1994–present:
  - Centre-right coalition
  - Centre-left coalition
  - Mixed coalition

Portrait	Name (Born–Died)	Term of office			Party	Government	Ref.
Portrait	Name (Born–Died)	Took office	Left office	Time in office	Party	Government	Ref.
Minister for Civil Protection Coordination
	Giuseppe Zamberletti (1933–2019)	28 June 1981	1 December 1982	1 year, 156 days	Christian Democracy	Spadolini I·II	
	Loris Fortuna (1924–1985)	1 December 1982	4 August 1983	246 days	Italian Socialist Party	Fanfani V	
	Vincenzo Scotti (1933–)	4 August 1983	26 March 1984	235 days	Christian Democracy	Craxi I	
	Giuseppe Zamberletti (1933–2019)	26 March 1984	28 July 1987	3 years, 124 days	Christian Democracy	Craxi I·II	
	Giuseppe Zamberletti (1933–2019)	26 March 1984	28 July 1987	3 years, 124 days	Christian Democracy	Fanfani VI	
	Remo Gaspari (1921–2011)	28 July 1987	13 April 1988	260 days	Christian Democracy	Goria	
	Vito Lattanzio (1926–2010)	13 April 1988	13 April 1991	3 years, 0 days	Christian Democracy	De Mita; Andreotti VI	
	Nicola Capria (1932–2009)	13 April 1991	28 June 1992	1 year, 76 days	Italian Socialist Party	Andreotti VII	
	Ferdinando Facchiano (1927–2022)	28 June 1992	29 April 1993	305 days	Italian Democratic Socialist Party	Amato I	
	Nicola Mancino (1931– )	29 April 1993	19 April 1994	355 days	Christian Democracy / Italian People's Party	Ciampi	
Office not in use		1994–1996				Berlusconi I	
Office not in use		1994–1996				Dini	
Minister of the Interior and Civil Protection Coordination
	Giorgio Napolitano (1925–2023)	17 May 1996	21 October 1998	2 years, 157 days	Democratic Party of the Left	Prodi I	
	Rosa Russo Iervolino (1936– )	21 October 1998	22 December 1999	1 year, 62 days	Italian People's Party	D'Alema I	
	Enzo Bianco (1951– )	22 December 1999	11 June 2001	1 year, 171 days	The Democrats	D'Alema II; Amato II	
Office not in use		2001–2022				Berlusconi II·III	
Office not in use		2001–2022				Prodi II	
Office not in use		2001–2022				Berlusconi IV	
Office not in use		2001–2022				Monti; Letta	
Office not in use		2001–2022				Renzi; Gentiloni	
Office not in use		2001–2022				Conte I·II; Draghi	
Minister for Civil Protection and Maritime Policies
	Nello Musumeci (1955– )	22 October 2022	Incumbent	3 years, 320 days	Brothers of Italy	Meloni	
