= Mario Baldassarri =

Italian economist and politician

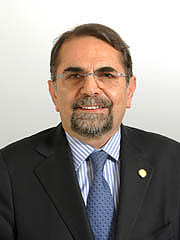

Member of the Senate
- In office 28 April 2006 – 14 March 2013
- Constituency: Marche

Personal details
- Born: 10 September 1946 (age 79) Macerata
- Party: National Alliance; The People of Freedom; Future and Freedom
- Education: University of Ancona (master degree); Massachusetts Institute of Technology (PhD)

Mario Baldassarri (born 10 September 1946) is an Italian economist and politician. He was a senator from 2006 to 2013.

Born in Macerata, he was the vice-minister of economy and finance in Silvio Berlusconi's second and third governments, from 2001 to 2006.

== Education and career ==
He graduated in economics in 1969 and specialized at the Massachusetts Institute of Technology in 1977 with Franco Modigliani, Robert Solow and Paul Samuelson as speakers. At the age of 30 he obtained a university chair, teaching at the University of Bologna as full professor of economics (1980–1988), and from that date full professor of political economy in the Faculty of Economics of the Sapienza University of Rome. He also taught at the University of Turin and the Catholic University of Milan.

In the 1980s he held the role of director of Eni for six years, and for four years that of economic advisor to EFIM (Entity for investments and financing of manufacturing industries). He was economic advisor to the Ministry of Finance, the Ministry of the Budget, the Ministry of the Treasury, the Presidency of the Council of Ministers and Confindustria.

Since February 2009, Baldassarri has been the president of the Confederation of Italian Entrepreneurs Worldwide (CIIM), an organization founded in 2004 under the auspices of the Italian Minister of Foreign Affairs and the Minister of Italians Living Abroad to create synergies between entrepreneurs in Italy and Italian businesses operating abroad.

== Politics ==
In 2001 he ran for the Chamber of Deputies in the Macerata college: supported by the House of Freedoms, he obtained 43.7% of the votes and was defeated by the candidate of the Olive Tree Valerio Calzolaio. In the Berlusconi II and III governments he held the position of Deputy Minister for the Economy and Finance (2001–2006).

In the 2006 general election he was elected senator with the National Alliance. In the 2008 general elections he was re-elected senator, in the ranks of the People of Freedom and held the position of president of the Finance and Treasury Commission of the Senate.

On 2 August 2010 he joined the Future and Freedom group of which he was initially regent. In the 2013 general election he was a candidate for the Senate in the Sicilian constituency, on the With Monti for Italy list, but he was not elected.

== Personal life ==
He has three children: Pierfrancesco, Marta and Pierluca.
