= Movement for Autonomy =

Movement for Autonomy Movimento per l'Autonomia
- Leader: Raffaele Lombardo
- Secretary: Roberto Di Mauro
- Founded: 30 April 2005
- Split from: Union of Christian and Centre Democrats
- Headquarters: Piazza Galatea 27, Catania
- Ideology: Regionalism; Autonomism; Christian democracy
- Political position: Centre
- National affiliation: Centre-right (2008–10); New Pole for Italy (2010–12); Centre-right (2013); Liberal Popular Alliance (2015–17); Centre-right (since 2017); Cantiere Popolare (since 2017); Great Sicily (since 2025)
- European Parliament group: EPP–ED (2005–09)
- Chamber of Deputies: 0 / 400
- Senate: 0 / 200
- European Parliament: 0 / 76
- Sicilian Regional Assembly: 7 / 70

Website
- www.mpa-italia.it

The Movement for Autonomy (Italian: Movimento per l'Autonomia, MpA) is a regionalist and Christian-democratic political party in Italy, based in Sicily. The MpA, whose founder and leader is Raffaele Lombardo, advocates for greater economic development, autonomy and legislative powers for Sicily and the other regions of southern Italy.

== History ==
=== Early years ===
The party was founded on 30 April 2005 as the Movement for Autonomy (Movimento per l'Autonomia) by Sicilian splinters from the Union of Christian and Centre Democrats (UDC) led by Raffaele Lombardo, as well as people from other centre-right parties, notably including Forza Italia (FI), the Italian Republican Party (PRI) and New Italian Socialist Party (NPSI).

At the 2006 general election, the party joined the centre-right House of Freedoms coalition and formed a joint-list, the Pact for Autonomies, with Lega Nord (LN), a regionalist movement based in northern Italy, and the Sardinian Action Party (PSd'Az). The MpA elected five deputies (two in the lists of FI) and two senators (one in the lists of FI). Lombardo claimed to have discarded the possibility of an alliance with the centre-left coalition The Union mainly because of the latter's opposition to the building of the Strait of Messina Bridge and their support for civil unions. In January 2008, the MpA formed a political pact with Vincenzo Scotti, leader of the Third Pole, who became president of the party.

At the 2008 general election, the party won 1.1% of the vote (7.4% in Sicily) and obtained eight deputies and two senators, thanks to the alliance with The People of Freedom (PdL) and Lega Nord. After the election the MpA joined the Berlusconi IV Cabinet.

More important, at the 2008 Sicilian regional election Lombardo was elected President of the region by a landslide and the MpA was the third largest party in the region with 13.8% of the vote (21.8% including also Lombardo's personal list and the Autonomist Democrats, the MpA's social-democratic and liberal faction) and 15 regional deputies.

=== The Party of the South ===
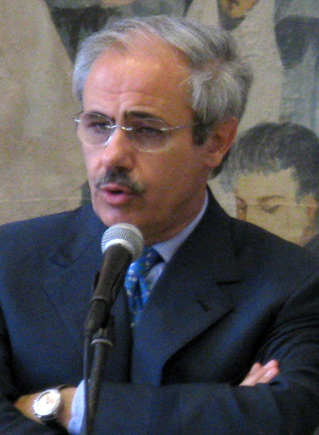
Raffaele Lombardo, the party's leader.

In the 2009 European Parliament election, the MpA, that changed its name into Movement for Autonomies (Movimento per le Autonomie) and aimed at becoming a national party, ran as part of The Autonomy, that included also The Right, the Pensioners' Party and the Alliance of the Centre. As part of its "national" strategy the party was joined by some small northern regionalist parties: Lombardia Autonoma, the Forum of Venetians, Autonomist Trentino and S.O.S. Italy. The alliance gained a mere 2.2% of the vote, thus returning no MEPs, but in its Sicilian stronghold it reached 15.6%. Since the election there were talks about the foundation of a new "Party of the South", of which the MpA would have been the core. In December 2009 Raffaele Lombardo, leader of the MpA and President of Sicily, formed his third cabinet that included ministers from his MpA party, the "PdL–Sicily" of Gianfranco Micciché and the newly formed regional section of Alliance for Italy (ApI), plus some independents, including one who was close to the centre-left opposition Democratic Party (PD). Lombardo appointed no members of the "official" PdL and of the UDC.

The break-up of the alliance with the official PdL in Sicily and all around the South led to a painful split. In January 2010 Vincenzo Scotti and four deputies out of eight, who wanted to continue the alliance with the PdL, were expelled from the party and formed their own movement called We the South (NS). However, in September 2010 Lombardo broke also with Micciché and formed his fourth cabinet supported by the so-called "third pole" coalition, composed of the MpA, Future and Freedom (FLI), a wing of the UDC and ApI, plus the PD. In November, as an ally of Gianfranco Fini's FLI, the MpA quit Berlusconi's government.

On 15 December 2010, the MpA was a founding member of the New Pole for Italy (NPI) along with the UDC, FLI and ApI.

In March 2011, Lombardo announced that the MpA would soon merge into a larger "party of the South".

In July 2012, Lombardo stepped down from secretary of the party and was replaced by Giovanni Pistorio, the long-time leader of the party in Sicily, along with Agazio Loiero, a former Southern Democrat and later Democrat who had been President of Calabria from 2005 to 2010.

=== The Party of Sicilians ===
In August 2012, Lombardo resigned also from President of Sicily, prompting an early regional election. The Sicilian section of the MpA was renamed as Party of Sicilians (PdS). Lombardo decided not to stand for re-election and the PdS chose to support Gianfranco Micciché, leader of Great South (GS), for president, as part of a "Sicilianist" coalition. Micciché won 15.4% of the vote, while the PdS obtained a mere 9.5% and ten regional deputies.

The PdS/MpA failed to pass the electoral thresholds in the 2013 general election, but, thanks to an agreement with the PdL, had one deputy (Angelo Attaguile) and two senators (Antonio Scavone and Pippo Compagnone) elected. Attaguile chose to team up with the LN in the "Lega Nord–Autonomies" parliamentary group. Attaguile later left the PdS/MpA and joined to Us with Salvini (NcS), becoming its national secretary.

In the 2017 regional election, the PdS/MpA formed teamed up with Cantiere Popolare (CP) under the banner of "Populars and Autonomists". The list won 7.1% of the vote, obtained six regional deputies and entered the regional government led by Nello Musumeci, the newly elected president of Sicily.

In December 2017, the PdS/MpA was a founding member of Us with Italy (NcI), a pro-Silvio Berlusconi centrist electoral list within the centre-right coalition for the 2018 general election, along with CP, Direction Italy (DI), Civic Choice (SC), Act! (F!) and splinters of Popular Alternative (AP – two groups, a liberal one led by Enrico Costa and a Christian-democratic one led by Maurizio Lupi). NcI was later enlarged to the Union of the Centre (UdC) and Identity and Action (IdeA), with the goal of reaching 3%, required to win seats from proportional lists under a new electoral law.

=== Recent developments ===
In December 2020, Matteo Salvini and Roberto Di Mauro signed a federative agreement between the League and the Movement for New Autonomy (Movimento per la Nuova Autonomia, MNA) based on a series of key points: "Infrastructural development, taxation of ten-year advantage for companies that want to invest in Sicily, a relentless fight against organised crime, Sicilian agri-food development, tourism and strengthening of Sicilian autonomy and administrative in favor of municipalities, simplification and digitisation."

In 2022, the party resumed its original name, Movement for Autonomy. In the 2022 regional election, the party, again in a joint list with CP, won 6.8% of the vote.

On 23 March 2025, Lombardo founded along with Gianfranco Miccichè and Roberto Lagalla the movement Great Sicily (Grande Sicilia) to work alongside MpA.

== Election results ==
=== Italian Parliament ===
Election	Leader	Chamber of Deputies				Senate of the Republic			
Election	Leader	Votes	%	Seats	+/–	Votes	%	Seats	+/–
2008	Raffaele Lombardo	410,499 (8th)	1.2	8 / 630	New	355,361 (8th)	1.1	2 / 315	New
2013	Raffaele Lombardo	148,534 (13th)	0.4	3 / 630	▼5	48,618 (15th)	0.2	2 / 315	0
2018	Giuseppe Maria Reina	Into NcI–UDC		0 / 630	▼3	Into NcI–UDC		0 / 315	▼2

=== European Parliament ===
Election	Leader	Votes	%	Seats	+/–	EP Group
2009 (Note: Run in a joint list with The Right.)	Raffaele Lombardo	681,290 (9th)	2.2	0 / 72	New	–
2014	Did not contest			0 / 73	0	–
2019	Did not contest			0 / 76	0	–
2024	Raffaele Lombardo	Into FI–NM		0 / 76	0	–

=== Sicilian Regional Assembly ===
Election	Leader	Votes	%	Seats	+/−
2006	Raffaele Lombardo	308,219 (5th)	12.5	10 / 90	–
2008	Raffaele Lombardo	371,418 (3rd)	14.0	16 / 90	▲6
2012	Raffaele Lombardo	182,737 (5th)	9.5	10 / 90	▼6
2017	Giuseppe Maria Reina	136,520 (4th) (Note: In a joint list with Cantiere Popolare.)	7.1	3 / 70	▼7
2022	Roberto Di Mauro	127,096 (7th)	6.8	4 / 70	▲1

== Symbols ==
2009–2020

2023–present

== Leadership ==
- (Federal) Secretary: Raffaele Lombardo (2005–2012), Giovanni Pistorio (2012), Agazio Loiero (2012–2013), Roberto Di Mauro (2018–present)
  - (Federal) Coordinator: Agazio Loiero (2011–2012)
  - Regional Secretary (PdS): Giovanni Pistorio (2012–2015), Rino Piscitello (2013–2015), Giuseppe Maria Reina (2017–2018)
- (Federal) President: Vincenzo Scotti (2008–2010)

== See also ==
- Southern Italy autonomist movements
