= Sicilian Alliance =

Italian political party

Sicilian Alliance Alleanza Siciliana
- Leader: Nello Musumeci
- Founded: 2005
- Dissolved: 2008
- Split from: National Alliance
- Merged into: The Right
- Ideology: Regionalism; Autonomism; National conservatism
- Political position: Right-wing

The Sicilian Alliance (it.: Alleanza Siciliana; sic.: Allianza Siciliana) was a minor autonomist and national-conservative political party in Sicily, Italy.

It was founded in 2005 and was led by Nello Musumeci, an MEP who was elected on the list of National Alliance.

On 7 October 2007, the party joined to Francesco Storace's The Right, although maintaining some of its autonomy as a regional section of the party, named "The Right – Sicilian Alliance", often shortened to "The Sicilian Right".

In the 2012 regional election the party gained four regional deputies in the Musumeci List (Gino Ioppolo, Santi Formica, Carmelo Currenti and the same Nello Musumeci). In 2014 Musumeci founded the movement #Diventerà Bellissima and in November 2017 is elected President of Sicily.

== See also ==
- Southern Italy autonomist movements
