= Raffaele Lombardo =

Italian politician (born 1950)

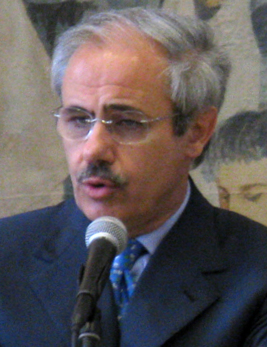

President of Sicily
- In office 28 April 2008 – 10 November 2012
- Preceded by: Salvatore Cuffaro
- Succeeded by: Rosario Crocetta

President of the Province of Catania
- In office 25 May 2003 – 12 February 2008
- Preceded by: Nello Musumeci
- Succeeded by: Giuseppe Castiglione

Member of the European Parliament for Italian Islands
- In office 20 July 1999 – 28 April 2008

Personal details
- Born: 29 October 1950 (age 75) Catania, Italy
- Party: MPA (since 2005)
- Other political affiliations: DC (1972–1994); CDC (1994–2002); UDC (2002–2005)
- Profession: Doctor

Raffaele Lombardo Italian pronunciation: [raffaˈɛːle lomˈbardo]; (born 29 October 1950) is an Italian politician. Born in Catania, he was Sicily's president and former member of the European Parliament for the Italian Islands with the Movement for the Autonomies, and has sat on the European Parliament's Committee on Civil Liberties, Justice and Home Affairs.

In 2005, Lombardo split off from the Union of Christian and Centre Democrats (UDC) to form the autonomist Sicilian-based Movement for Autonomy (MpA), after he had accused the UDC leadership of being too centralist. In 2008, he was elected as president of Sicily, obtaining over 65% of the regional votes and defeating Anna Finocchiaro of the Democratic Party (PD). On 31 July 2012, he resigned from the presidency because he was under investigation for external contribution with mafia and pork-barrelling, as it appears that he had relationships with some figure of Cosa Nostra. Nevertheless, in the following elections he managed to have his 23 years old son Toti elected in the Sicilian Regional Assembly. On 19 February 2014, he was sentenced to six years and eight months in prison for mafia association. In 2022, he was acquitted in the second appeal trial; the acquittal was confirmed by Italy's Supreme Court of Cassation in 2023.

== Education ==
- 1968: Secondary school-leaving certificate in classical subjects
- Graduate in medicine and surgery
- Specialisation in forensic psychiatry
- Private practice
- 1977: Provincial secretary of the Catania Youth DC
- Regional secretary of the Christian Democratic Centre (CCD) for Sicily
- Member of Catania Municipal Council for eight years
- Several terms as Catania Municipal Councillor with responsibility for budget, planning, health, cultural heritage, youth issues, and taxation

== Career ==
- 1986−1994: Member of the Sicilian Regional Assembly with Christian Democracy (DC)
- 1991−1992: Assessor for Local Authorities of the Sicilian Regional Executive (resigned for enquiries)
- 1999−2008: Member of the European Parliament with CCD
- 2003−2008: President of the Province of Catania with UDC
- 2008−2012: President of Sicily with MPA
