= Rita Borsellino =

Italian politician (1945–2018)

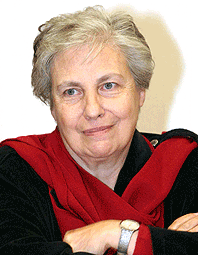

Member of the European Parliament
- In office 14 July 2009 – 1 July 2014
- Constituency: Italian Islands

Personal details
- Born: 2 June 1945; Palermo, Italy
- Died: 15 August 2018 (aged 73); Palermo, Italy
- Political party: Democratic Party
- Relatives: Paolo Borsellino (brother)

Rita Borsellino (Italian pronunciation: [ˈriːta borselˈliːno]; 2 June 1945 – 15 August 2018) was an Italian Sicilian anti-Mafia activist, politician and, between 2009 and 2014, a Member of the European Parliament (MEP) for the Democratic Party.

== Early life ==
Borsellino was born in Palermo, Sicily, and worked there as a pharmacist. In July 1992 her brother, Judge Paolo Borsellino, and the agents of his escort were killed by the Mafia in a bomb explosion. She began to organise and participate in events such as public debates, rallies and protests against organised crime. These included events in France and Germany, such as an event in 1994 in Paris with the Argentinian organisation Mothers of the Plaza de Mayo.

== Political career ==
In 1994 she was invited to join Libera, an Italian NGO working against organised crime. In 1995 she became vice-president of the organisation and in 2005 she was named honorary president. Borsellino was also active in the peace movement, attending international peace conferences in 2000 and 2002.

In 1998 she became president of Associazione Piera Cutino, a non-profit foundation that promotes medical research into thalassaemia.

=== 2006 regional election ===
In 2005, some minor parties of The Union, mainly from the radical left wing, endorsed her as their candidate in the primary election for the president of the Sicilian region. She was also backed by the Democrats of the Left, being eventually supported by all the coalition parties, except the Daisy (Margherita) who presented another candidate. In the primary election, held on 4 December 2005, she defeated her competitor, and gained the candidacy of The Union for the Sicilian regional election held on 28 May 2006, where she lost to the incumbent governor Salvatore Cuffaro.

Borsellino was the first Sicilian woman nominated for the presidency of the Sicilian region, and also attracted the highest ever number of votes for a candidate from The Union.

=== Later elections ===
In 2008 she ran for the Italian Senate as an independent with The Left – The Rainbow, but was not elected. In 2009 she headed the Sicilian Democratic Party list in the European elections, and subsequently became a Member of the European Parliament (MEP). During her tenure, Borsellino served on the parliamentary committee on civil justice.

On 4 March 2012 Borsellino ran in a centre-left open primary for the seat of Mayor of Palermo, with support from the Democratic Party, Left Ecology Freedom, the Federation of the Left, Federation of the Greens and Italy of Values. She was defeated in the election by independent candidate Fabrizio Ferrandelli.

Borsellino continued to serve as an MEP and was on a special parliamentary commission on organised crime, corruption and money laundering.

== Recognition ==
In August 2004 Borsellino was awarded the San Lorenzo Prize for her civic contributions. She has received honorary citizenship of Florence, Offanengo, Massa Lombarda and Crevalcore.

== Death ==
Borsellino died at the Civic Hospital in Palermo on 15 August 2018 after a long illness.
