= Nello Musumeci =

Italian politician (born 1955)

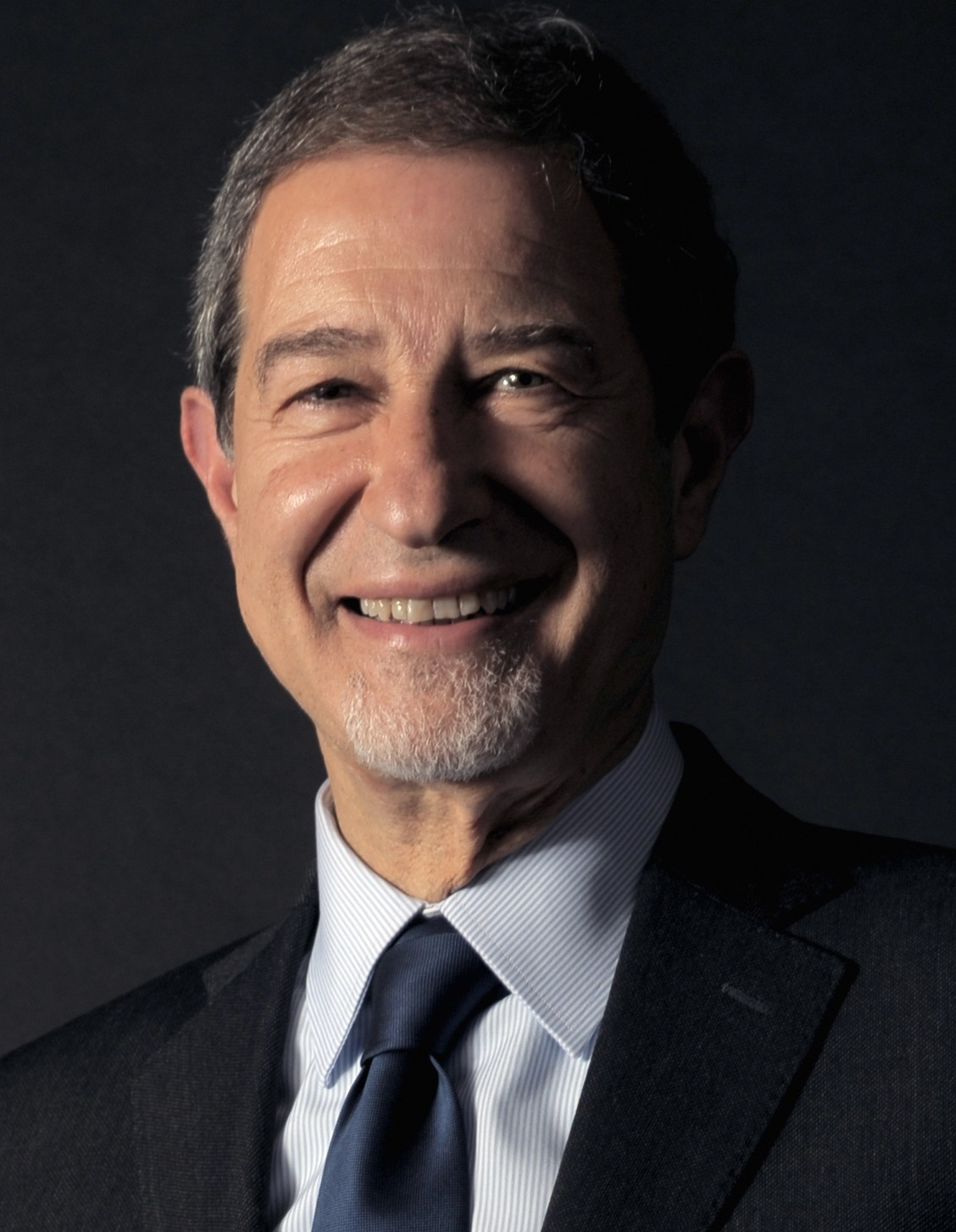
- Musumeci in 2017

Minister for Civil Protection and Maritime Policies
- Incumbent
- Assumed office 22 October 2022
- Prime Minister: Giorgia Meloni
- Preceded by: Mara Carfagna

President of Sicily
- In office 18 November 2017 – 13 October 2022
- Preceded by: Rosario Crocetta
- Succeeded by: Renato Schifani

Member of the Senate of the Republic
- Incumbent
- Assumed office 13 October 2022
- Constituency: Catania

Member of the European Parliament for Italian Islands
- In office 19 July 1994 – 14 July 2009

President of Province of Catania
- In office 19 February 1994 – 25 May 2003
- Preceded by: Antonio Pennisi
- Succeeded by: Raffaele Lombardo

Personal details
- Born: Sebastiano Musemeci; 21 January 1955 (age 71) Militello in Val di Catania, Italy
- Party: DB (since 2014); FdI (since 2022)
- Other political affiliations: MSI (1970–1995); AN (1995–2005); AS (2005–2007); LD (2007–2014)
- Education: Kore University of Enna; University of Catania
- Profession: Bank clerk; Journalist

Sebastiano "Nello" Musumeci (born 21 January 1955) is a right-wing Italian politician. Musumeci is serving as Minister for Civil Protection and Maritime Policies since 22 October 2022 in the government of Giorgia Meloni. He previously served as president of Sicily from 18 November 2017 until 13 October 2022.

Musumeci was a Member of the European Parliament for the Italian seat Islands, where he was a member of the Union for a Europe of Nations parliamentary group. He sat on the European Parliament's Committee on Fisheries and its Committee on Industry, Research and Energy.

== Biography ==
Musumeci was born in Militello in Val di Catania, Sicily. At the age of fifteen, Musumeci became a member of Giovane Italia, the youth organization of "Italian Social Movement", a neo-fascist and post-fascist political party in Italy. After completing his studies in communication sciences, Musumeci began working as a banker at the UniCredit group a global banking and financial services company.

Following his stint as a banker, he began his career as a journalist. In the 1980s, Musumeci also taught at the Istituto Supreriore di Giornalismo in Catania. Later, Musumeci became one of the founders of the Istituto Siciliano di Studi Politici ed Economici (ISSPE).

At the age of twenty, he served as a municipal councilor in his hometown of Militello in Val di Catania. Soon, he became Deputy Mayor of Gravina di Catania and Castel de Judica.

In 1990, he was elected Provincial Councilor of Catania and in 1994, as a member of the MSI and not yet forty, he became President of the province of Catania. In 1995, Musumeci joined the National Alliance Party and represented the region as a Member of the European Parliament in Brussels.

Committed to fighting crime, Musumeci became president of the regional anti-mafia commission. Between the years 1995-2001, and again between 2005 and 2006, Musumeci received several threats from the mafia and was forced to live under guard.

He is the founder and current leader of DiventeràBellissima, a regionalist party of Sicily, after having left National Alliance in 2005 and founded the Sicilian Alliance. He ran unsuccessfully for the presidency of the Sicilian Region in 2006 obtaining 5.3% of the votes, and again in 2012 when he came second with 25.7%.

He was a substitute for the Committee on Agriculture and Rural Development, as well as for the delegation to the EU-Turkey joint parliamentary committee.

=== President of Sicily ===
In November 2017, Musumeci won the Sicilian Regional Election with 39.9% of the vote. The anti-establishment 5-Star Movement (M5S) candidate Giacarlo Canceller received 36.6% and the center-left candidate Fabrizio Micari representing the Democratic Party received 18.6%. Musumeci also secured a majority in the regional assembly when his center-right coalition received 36 of 70 seats.

Musumeci won the election with the support of Silvio Berlusconi, founder of the centre-right party Forza Italia (FI), who campaigned heavily for him in the runup to the election. Former PM Berlusconi promised the citizens of Sicily everything from a bridge over the Strait of Messina to a casino in Taormina. Following Musumeci's victory, he claimed to "fight for Italy and show what we can do".

Besides battling crime, Musumeci is grappling with pressing regional issues, including the effects of climate change, as Sicily has been experiencing major weather events that have impacted the coast in Palermo recently. Musumeci will need to decide what to do with the inadequate infrastructure and those left homeless. Also, the Zafferana area in the vicinity of Mount Etna experienced a moderate earthquake on 26 December 2018 that left a number of people injured. The new president is also addressing the promised bridge across the Messina Strait.

=== Minister ===
Musumeci became a member of the Italian Senate in September 2022, and he serves as Minister for Civil Protection and Sea Policies since 22 October 2022 in the Meloni Cabinet.

== Education ==
- 1973: secondary school-leaving certificate in technical subjects
- Studies in law
- Bank teller and journalist publicist
- 1983: teacher at the Higher Institute of Journalism of Acireale

== Career ==
- 1994–2003: President of the Province of Catania
- 1994–2009: Member of the European Parliament
- 2002–2004: Regional Coordinator of National Alliance for Sicily
- Substitute vice-chairman of Aiccre, "Italian Association of European Municipalities and Regions"
- 2011: Undersecretary of Ministry of Labour and Social Policies
- 2012–2017: Member of the Sicilian Regional Assembly
- 2017–2022: President of Sicily
- Since 2022: Member of the Senate
