= Politics of Friuli-Venezia Giulia =

The politics of Friuli-Venezia Giulia, a region of Italy, takes place in the framework of an "anomalous presidential" representative democracy or prime-ministerial system with an executive presidency, whereby the President of the Region is the head of government, and of a multi-party system. Executive power is exercised by the Regional Government. Legislative power is vested in both the government and the Regional Council.

== Executive branch ==
The Regional Government (Giunta Regionale) is presided by the President of the Region (Presidente della Regione), who is elected for a five-year term, and is composed by the President and the Ministers (Assessori), who are currently 10, including a vice president.

=== List of presidents ===
#	Name	Term of office		Party	Legislature
1	Alfredo Berzanti	24 June 1964	1 July 1968	DC	I (1964)
1	Alfredo Berzanti	1 July 1968	30 July 1973	DC	II (1968)
2	Antonio Comelli	30 July 1973	21 September 1978	DC	III (1973)
2	Antonio Comelli	21 September 1978	29 July 1983	DC	IV (1978)
2	Antonio Comelli	29 July 1983	23 October 1984	DC	V (1983)
3	Adriano Biasutti	23 October 1984	8 July 1988	DC	V (1983)
3	Adriano Biasutti	8 July 1988	14 January 1992	DC	VI (1988)
4	Vinicio Turello	14 January 1992	3 August 1993	DC	VI (1988)
5	Pietro Fontanini	3 August 1993	12 January 1994	LN	VII (1993)
6	Renzo Travanut	12 January 1994	18 July 1994	PDS	VII (1993)
7	Alessandra Guerra	18 July 1994	7 November 1995	LN	VII (1993)
8	Sergio Cecotti	7 November 1995	5 December 1996	LN	VII (1993)
9	Giancarlo Cruder	5 December 1996	31 July 1998	PPI	VII (1993)
10	Roberto Antonione	31 July 1998	15 June 2001	FI	VIII (1998)
11	Renzo Tondo	15 June 2001	14 June 2003	FI	VIII (1998)

Directly-elected presidents (since 2003)

President		Term of office		Party	Legislature
12	Riccardo Illy (b. 1955)	14 June 2003	18 April 2008	Ind	IX (2003)
(11)	Renzo Tondo (b. 1956)	18 April 2008	25 April 2013	PdL	X (2008)
13	Debora Serracchiani (b. 1970)	25 April 2013	3 May 2018	PD	XI (2013)
14	Massimiliano Fedriga (b. 1980)	3 May 2018	7 April 2023	LN	XII (2018)
14	Massimiliano Fedriga (b. 1980)	7 April 2023	In office	LN	XIII (2023)

== Legislative branch ==
The Regional Council of Friuli-Venezia Giulia (Consiglio Regionale del Friuli-Venezia Giulia) is composed of 60 members and is elected with proportional representation plus a majority premium for the winning coalition. The council is elected for a five-year term, but, if the President suffers a vote of no confidence, resigns or dies, under the simul stabunt vel simul cadent clause (introduced in 2003), also the council will be dissolved and there will be a fresh election.

=== Current composition ===
The Regional Council of Friuli-Venezia Giulia is currently composed of the following political groups:

Party	Seats	Status
Democratic Party	11 / 48	In opposition
League FVG	9 / 48	In government
Brothers of Italy	8 / 48	In government
Fedriga for President	8 / 48	In government
Pact for Autonomy – Civica FVG	5 / 48	In opposition
Forza Italia	3 / 48	In government
Mixed Group	3 / 48	In opposition
Mixed Group	1 / 48	External support

== Local government ==
=== Former Provinces ===
The provinces were disbanded in 2017–2018.

Province	Inhabitants
Udine	533,282
Pordenone	312,794
Trieste	234,874
Gorizia	140,268

=== Municipalities ===
Provincial capitals

Municipality	Inhabitants	Mayor	Party	Election
Trieste	204,420	Roberto Dipiazza	Forza Italia	2021
Udine	99,169	Alberto Felice De Toni	Democratic Party	2023
Pordenone	51,229	Alessandro Basso	Brothers of Italy	2025
Gorizia	34,844	Rodolfo Ziberna	Forza Italia	2022

Other municipalities

Cities with more than 15,000 inhabitants.

Municipality	Inhabitants	Mayor	Party	Election
Monfalcone	28,258	Luca Fasan	Lega Friuli-VG	2025
Sacile	19,837	Carlo Spagnol	Forza Italia	2023
Cordenons	18,301	Andrea Delle Vedove	Lega Friuli-VG	2021
Codroipo	16,148	Guido Nardini	Democratic Party	2022
Azzano Decimo	15,775	Massimo Piccini	Brothers of Italy	2022
Porcia	15,293	Marco Sartini	Lega Friuli-VG	2024
San Vito al Tagliamento	15,078	Alberto Bernava	Democratic Party	2021

== Parties and elections ==
=== Latest regional election ===
In the latest regional election, which took place on 2–3 April 2023, incumbent president Massimiliano Fedriga of Lega Friuli-Venezia Giulia was re-elected by a landslide.

Candidates	Votes	%	Seats	Parties	Votes	%	Seats
Massimiliano Fedriga	314,824	64.24	1	Lega Friuli-Venezia Giulia	75,117	19.02	9
Massimiliano Fedriga	314,824	64.24	1	Brothers of Italy	71,503	18.10	8
Massimiliano Fedriga	314,824	64.24	1	Fedriga for President	70,192	17.77	8
Massimiliano Fedriga	314,824	64.24	1	Forza Italia	26,329	6.67	3
Massimiliano Fedriga	314,824	64.24	1	Responsible Autonomy	7,762	1.97	–
Massimiliano Fedriga	314,824	64.24	1	Total	250,903	63.53	28
Massimo Moretuzzo	139,018	28.37	1	Democratic Party	65,143	16.49	10
Massimo Moretuzzo	139,018	28.37	1	Pact for Autonomy	24,838	6.29	4
Massimo Moretuzzo	139,018	28.37	1	Five Star Movement	9,486	2.40	1
Massimo Moretuzzo	139,018	28.37	1	Greens and Left Alliance	8,029	2.03	1
Massimo Moretuzzo	139,018	28.37	1	Open – Left FVG	5,957	1.51	1
Massimo Moretuzzo	139,018	28.37	1	Slovene Union	4,016	1.02	1
Massimo Moretuzzo	139,018	28.37	1	Total	117,469	29.74	18
Giorgia Tripoli	22,840	4.66	–	Together Free	15,712	3.98	–
Alessandro Maran	13,374	2.73	–	Action – Italia Viva – More Europe	10,869	2.75	–
Blank and invalid votes	12,019	2.39					
Total candidates	490,056	100.00	2	Total parties	394,957	100.00	46
Registered voters/turnout	1,109,395	45.26					
Source: Friuli-Venezia Giulia Region
