= List of presidents of Friuli-Venezia Giulia =

This is the list of presidents of Friuli-Venezia Giulia since 1964.

Elected by the Regional Council (1964–2003)

| # | Name | Term of office | | Party | Legislature |
|---|---|---|---|---|---|
| 1 | Alfredo Berzanti | 24 June 1964 | 1 July 1968 | DC | I (1964) |
| 1 | Alfredo Berzanti | 1 July 1968 | 30 July 1973 | DC | II (1968) |
| 2 | Antonio Comelli | 30 July 1973 | 21 September 1978 | DC | III (1973) |
| 2 | Antonio Comelli | 21 September 1978 | 29 July 1983 | DC | IV (1978) |
| 2 | Antonio Comelli | 29 July 1983 | 23 October 1984 | DC | V (1983) |
| 3 | Adriano Biasutti | 23 October 1984 | 8 July 1988 | DC | V (1983) |
| 3 | Adriano Biasutti | 8 July 1988 | 14 January 1992 | DC | VI (1988) |
| 4 | Vinicio Turello | 14 January 1992 | 3 August 1993 | DC | VI (1988) |
| 5 | Pietro Fontanini | 3 August 1993 | 12 January 1994 | LN | VII (1993) |
| 6 | Renzo Travanut | 12 January 1994 | 18 July 1994 | PDS | VII (1993) |
| 7 | Alessandra Guerra | 18 July 1994 | 7 November 1995 | LN | VII (1993) |
| 8 | Sergio Cecotti | 7 November 1995 | 5 December 1996 | LN | VII (1993) |
| 9 | Giancarlo Cruder | 5 December 1996 | 31 July 1998 | PPI | VII (1993) |
| 10 | Roberto Antonione | 31 July 1998 | 15 June 2001 | FI | VIII (1998) |
| 11 | Renzo Tondo | 15 June 2001 | 14 June 2003 | FI | VIII (1998) |

Directly-elected presidents (since 2003)

| President | | Term of office | | Party | Legislature |
|---|---|---|---|---|---|
| 12 | Riccardo Illy (b. 1955) | 14 June 2003 | 18 April 2008 | Ind | IX (2003) |
| (11) | Renzo Tondo (b. 1956) | 18 April 2008 | 25 April 2013 | PdL | X (2008) |
| 13 | Debora Serracchiani (b. 1970) | 25 April 2013 | 3 May 2018 | PD | XI (2013) |
| 14 | Massimiliano Fedriga (b. 1980) | 3 May 2018 | 7 April 2023 | LN | XII (2018) |
| 14 | Massimiliano Fedriga (b. 1980) | 7 April 2023 | In office | LN | XIII (2023) |
