= Fedriga Cabinet =

Cabinet of Friuli-Venezia Giulia, Italy

Cabinet of Massimiliano Fedriga Cabinet Fedriga
- 27th Cabinet of Friuli-Venezia Giulia
- 3 May 2018-
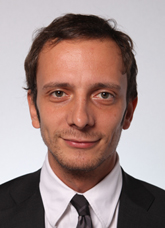
- Date formed: 3 May 2018

People and organisations
- President: Massimiliano Fedriga (Lega)
- Vice president: Riccardo Ricciardi (FI)
- No. of ministers: 10
- Member parties: Lega; FI; PFVG; FdI; AR
- Status in legislature: Coalition government 28 / 49
- Opposition parties: PD; Cit; M5S; PpA; Left; SSk

History
- Election: 2018 regional election
- Legislature term: 12th Regional Council
- Predecessor: Serracchiani Cabinet

The Fedriga Cabinet is the current region government of Friuli-Venezia Giulia, Italy, sworn in on 3 May 2018 after Massimiliano Fedriga formally became President of Friuli-Venezia Giulia. It is the 27th Cabinet of Friuli-Venezia Giulia.

It was formed after the 2018 Friuli-Venezia Giulia regional election by the Lega Friuli-Venezia Giulia (LFVG), Forza Italia (FI), FVG Project (PFVG), Brothers of Italy (FdI) and Responsible Autonomy (AR). Excluding the President, the cabinet comprises ten assessors. 5 are members of the Lega, 2 are members of FI, 1 is member of PFVG, 1 is member of FdI and 1 is independent.

== In the Regional Council ==
Confidence vote
Regional Council	Vote	Parties	Votes
Regional Council	Yes	Lega (17), FI (4), FdI (3), PFVG (2), AR (1), Mixed (1)	28 / 49
Regional Council	No	PD (11), M5S (4), PpA (2), Cit (2), Left (1), Mixed (1)	21 / 49

== Composition ==
=== Assessors by party ===
- Lega Friuli - Venezia Giulia
5
- Forza Italia
2
- FVG Project
1
- Brothers of Italy
1
- Independent
1

=== List of assessors ===
Office	Name	Term of office	Party
President	Massimiliano Fedriga	3 May 2018 - incumbent	Lega Friuli-Venezia Giulia
Vice president and Assessor of the Health	Riccardo Ricciardi	3 May 2018 - incumbent	Forza Italia
Assessor of the Finances	Barbara Zilli	3 May 2018 - incumbent	Lega Friuli-Venezia Giulia
Assessor of the Regional Property	Sebastiano Callari	3 May 2018 - incumbent	Lega Friuli-Venezia Giulia
Assessor of the Culture and Sport	Tiziana Gibelli	3 May 2018 - incumbent	Forza Italia
Assessor of the Security and Immigration	Pierpaolo Roberti	3 May 2018 - incumbent	Lega Friuli-Venezia Giulia
Assessor of the Labour, Education and Family	Alessia Rosolen	3 May 2018 - incumbent	Independent
Assessor of the Environment and Energy	Fabio Scoccimarro	3 May 2018 - incumbent	Brothers of Italy
Assessor of the Infrastructures and Territory	Graziano Pizzimenti	3 May 2018 - incumbent	Lega Friuli-Venezia Giulia
Assessor of the Agri-Food, Forestry and Fish Resources	Stefano Zannier	3 May 2018 - incumbent	Lega Friuli-Venezia Giulia
Assessor of the Productive Activities and Tourism	Sergio Emidio Bini	3 May 2018 - incumbent	FVG Project
