= 1993 Friuli-Venezia Giulia regional election =

The 1993 Friuli-Venezia Giulia regional election took place on 6 June 1993.

== Events ==
The Northern League, at its first appearance in a regional election, became the largest party with 26.7%, while Christian Democracy, which had governed the Region since 1964, came second with 22.3%. The combined score of all regionalist parties was 37.5%.

Between 1993 and 1998 the Region was quinte instable politically and was governed by a succession of governments led both my members of the Northern League (Pietro Fontanini, Alessandra Guerra and Sergio Cecotti) and by centre-left figures (Renzo Travanut and Giancarlo Cruder).

== Results ==
Party	votes	votes (%)	seats
Northern League Friuli-Venezia Giulia	212,497	26.7	18
Christian Democracy	177,692	22.3	15
Democratic Party of the Left	78,577	9.9	6
Italian Social Movement	66,290	8.3	5
Communist Refoundation Party	43,991	5.5	4
Federation of the Greens	43,004	5.4	3
Italian Socialist Party	37,622	4.7	3
Lega Autonomia Friuli	37,427	4.7	2
List for Trieste	26,322	3.3	2
The Network	14,029	1.8	-
Italian Republican Party	13,645	1.7	1
Italian Democratic Socialist Party	12,665	1.6	-
Friuli Movement	12,353	1.6	-
Italian Liberal Party	10,299	1.3	1
Slovene Union	9,636	1.2	-
Total	796,049	100.0	60

Source: Istituto Cattaneo
