= 2008 Friuli-Venezia Giulia regional election =

← 2003	13–14 April 2008	2013 →

All 59 seats of the Regional Council
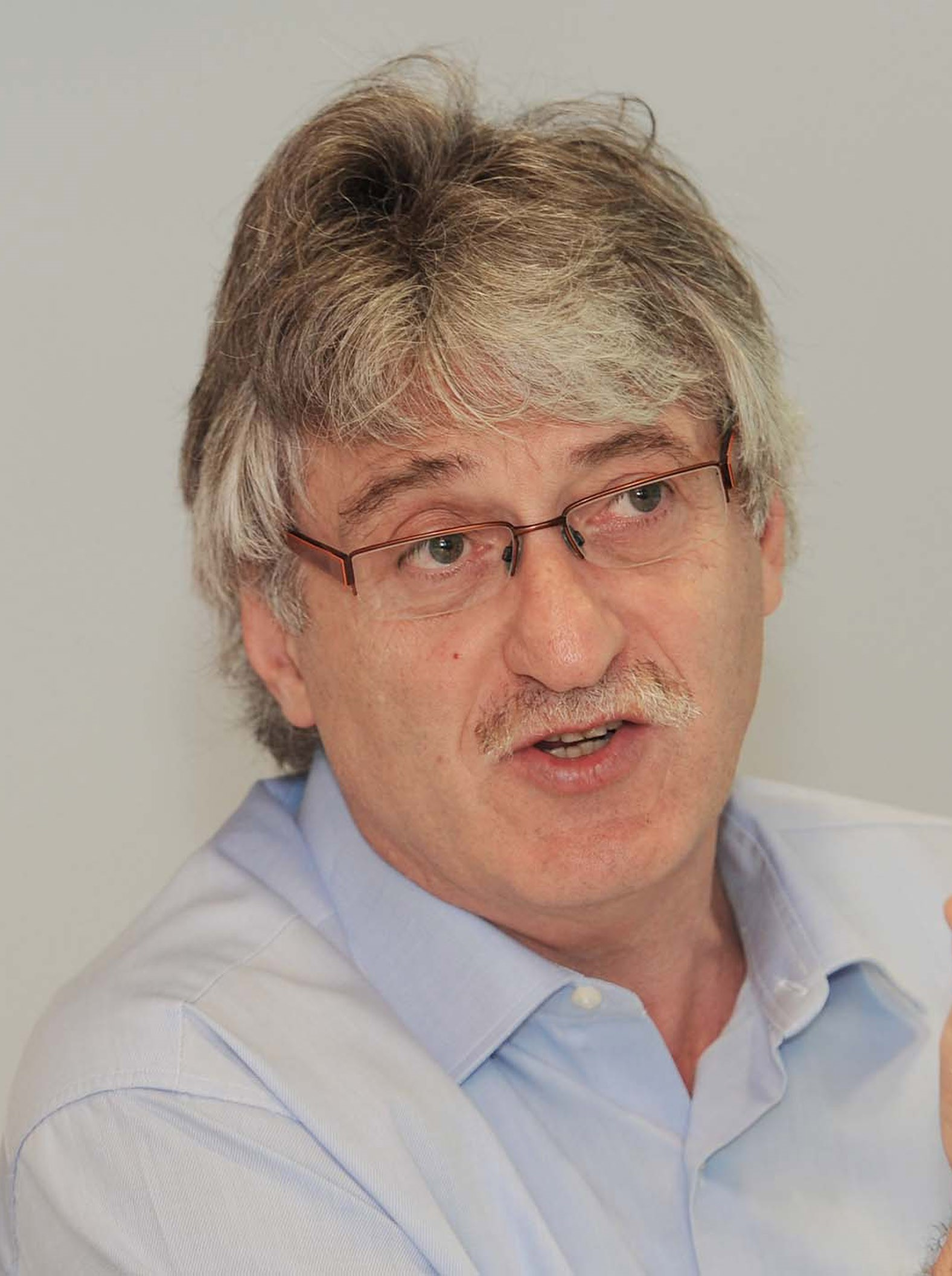

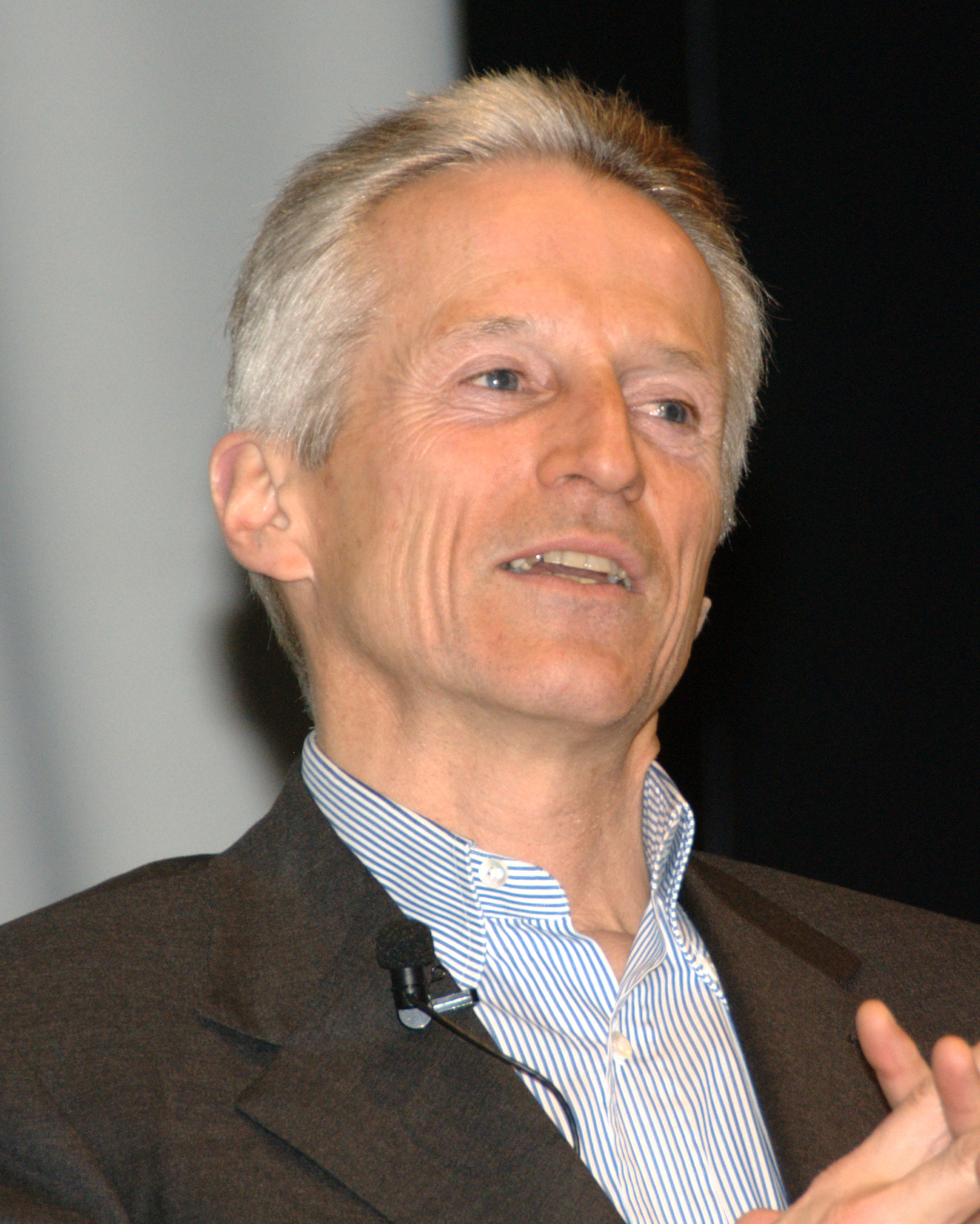
	Majority party	Minority party
Leader	Renzo Tondo	Riccardo Illy
Party	People of Freedom	Independent
Alliance	Centre-right	Centre-left
Seats won	34	23
Seat change	▲11	▼14
Popular vote	409,430	351,064
Percentage	53.84%	46.16
Swing	▲10.78%	▼7.00%
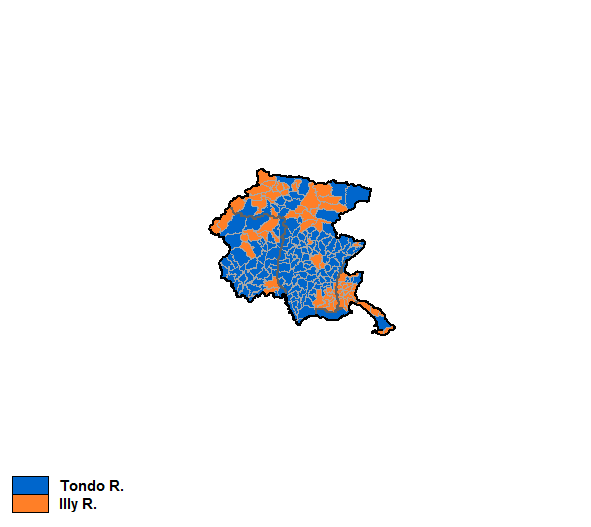
President before election
Riccardo Illy
Independent
President-elect
Renzo Tondo
People of Freedom

The 2008 Friuli-Venezia Giulia regional election took place on 13–14 April 2008.

Former President Renzo Tondo (The People of Freedom) defeated incumbent Riccardo Illy (an independent closed to the Democratic Party).

== Results ==
13–14 April 2008 Friuli-Venezia Giulia regional election results
Candidates	Votes	%	Seats	Parties	Votes	%	Seats
Renzo Tondo	409,430	53.84	1				
Renzo Tondo	409,430	53.84	1	The People of Freedom	187,075	33.02	21
Renzo Tondo	409,430	53.84	1	Northern League Friuli-Venezia Giulia	73,239	12.93	8
Renzo Tondo	409,430	53.84	1	Union of the Centre	34,840	6.15	4
Renzo Tondo	409,430	53.84	1	Pensioners' Party	8,561	1.51	1
Renzo Tondo	409,430	53.84	1	Total	303,715	53.60	34
Riccardo Illy	351,064	46.16	1				
Riccardo Illy	351,064	46.16	1	Democratic Party	169,597	29.93	15
Riccardo Illy	351,064	46.16	1	The Left – The Rainbow	32,041	5.65	3
Riccardo Illy	351,064	46.16	1	Citizens for the President	28,855	5.09	2
Riccardo Illy	351,064	46.16	1	Italy of Values	25,414	4.49	2
Riccardo Illy	351,064	46.16	1	Slovene Union	7,008	1.24	1
Riccardo Illy	351,064	46.16	1	Total	262,915	46.40	23
Total candidates	760,494	100.00	2	Total parties	566,630	100.00	57
Source: Friuli-Venezia Giulia Region
