= Citizens (Friuli-Venezia Giulia political party) =

Citizens Cittadini
- Leader: Bruno Malattia
- Founded: 2003
- Headquarters: Piazza Oberdan 6, Trieste
- Ideology: Regionalism
- Regional Council of FVG: 0 / 48

Website
- www.libertacivica.org

Citizens (Italian: Cittadini) is a centrist Italian civic list active in Friuli-Venezia Giulia since 2003. The list is the expression of the cultural and political association "Una Regione in Comune".

== History ==
In the 2003 regional election which saw the election of Riccardo Illy, the list, that supported his candidacy for President, won 7.5% of the vote.

In the 2008 regional election the list won 5.1% of the vote. As Illy was defeated, it changed its name to Civic Freedom (Libertà Civica) in order to reflect its new condition.

The party ran in the 2013 regional election as Citizens for Debora Serracchiani President and won 5.3% of the vote and 3 seats, being instrumental in Debora Serracchiani's election, while in the 2018 regional election it ran as Citizens for Bolzonello President, winning the 4% of the vote and 2 seats.

In December 2022, after an internal crisis and the resignation of the entire executive office in November, the movement lost its two regional councillors following the split of "Civica FVG", which intended to continue the alliance with the centre-left coalition.

In 2023, the President of the Citizens Bruno Malattia announces the decision not to let the list participate in the regional election, due to the lack of agreement with both the Democratic Party (considered biased too much to the left) and with the Third Pole.
