= Julian Front =

Italian political party

Julian Front (Fronte Giuliano, FG) was a regionalist political party active in the Province of Trieste, Italy.

Formed in the mid 1990s, the party strived for the independence of Trieste from Italy (through the return to the Free Territory of Trieste), in line with a tradition started with the Independence Front for the Free Julian State after World War II and continued with the List for Trieste in the late 1970s. Prior to that FG supports the separation from Friuli and the creation of the region of Trieste.

FG took part to the 1998 Friuli-Venezia Giulia regional election, gaining 1.0% of the vote (5.4% in the Province of Trieste).

In 1999 the party was a founding member of the Autonomists for Europe, which soon folded. Recently the party got closer to Lega Nord and wants to join in as a new "national section" and not through Lega Nord Friuli-Venezia Giulia (result of the merger between Lega Nord Friuli and Lega Nord Trieste in 2001).

In 2012 the Julian Front joined together with the Friuli Front (Fronte Friuli), led by Stefano Colussi, in the Front for Independence (Fronte per l'Indipendenza).

== Leadership ==
- President: Giorgio Gherlanz
- Secretary: Giorgio Marchesich
