= Conference of Regions and Autonomous Provinces =

Political body in Italy

Conference of Regions and Autonomous Provinces Conferenza delle Regioni e delle Province Autonome

Leadership
- President: Massimiliano Fedriga, League since 9 April 2021
- Vice President: vacant

Structure
- Seats: 21
- Political groups: Party affiliation List: FI (5); Lega (4); FdI (3); PD (3); M5S (2); Ind. (2); SVP (1); UV (1)
- Political groups: Coalition List: Centre-right (15); Centre-left (6)

Website
- www.regioni.it

Footnotes

The Conference of Regions and Autonomous Provinces, originally named "Conference of Presidents of Regions and Autonomous Provinces", is a political body of coordination between the regions of Italy and, chiefly, their presidents. Established in Pomezia, Lazio on 15–16 January 1981, the Conference is composed of 21 members, including the representatives of the autonomous provinces of Trentino and South Tyrol, forming the Region of Trentino-Alto Adige/Südtirol, and has since been the official seat of interregional institutional dialogue.

The priorities that led to the establishment of the Conference were:

- improving the collaboration and consultation with the government (that is the Council of Ministers, whose president is internationally known as Prime Minister of Italy) through the elaboration of documents shared by the whole "system of regional governments";
- establishing a permanent interregional consultation to favour the spread of "best practices";
- representing the "system of regional governments" externally and through institutional relations;
- underlining the role of the regional institution in the creation of the European Union.

The Conference's role and relevance increased following the establishment by the Italian government of the State–Regions Conference (1983) and the Unified State, Regions, Cities and Local Autonomous Conference (1997), the latter being the joint meeting of the State–Regions Conference and the State–Cities and Local Autonomies Conference (1997), where municipalities (comuni), provinces and mountain communities are represented. Usually, joint documents are prepared by the Conference and are later presented during the meetings of the State–Regions Conference and the Unified State, Regions, Cities and Local Autonomous Conference.

== List of members ==
| Region or Province | Name | Portrait | Since | Term | Party | Coalition | Last election |
President of Regions
| Aosta Valley | Renzo Testolin (1968–) | | 2 March 2023 (Note: Renzo Testolin was president also in 2019–2020.) | 2025–2030 | UV | Centre-right | 2025 |
| Piedmont | Alberto Cirio (1972–) | | 6 June 2019 | 2024–2029 | FI | Centre-right | 2024 |
| Liguria | Marco Bucci (1959–) | | 6 November 2024 | 2024–2029 | Independent | Centre-right | 2024 |
| Lombardy | Attilio Fontana (1962–) | | 26 March 2018 | 2023–2028 | Lega–LL | Centre-right | 2023 |
| Veneto | Alberto Stefani (1992–) | | 5 December 2025 | 2025–2030 | Lega–LV | Centre-right | 2025 |
| Friuli-Venezia Giulia | Massimiliano Fedriga (1980–) | | 30 April 2018 | 2023–2028 | Lega–LFVG | Centre-right | 2023 |
| Emilia-Romagna | Michele De Pascale (1985–) | | 13 December 2024 | 2024–2029 | PD | Centre-left | 2024 |
| Tuscany | Eugenio Giani (1959–) | | 8 October 2020 | 2025–2030 | PD | Centre-left | 2025 |
| Umbria | Stefania Proietti (1975–) | | 2 December 2024 | 2024–2029 | Indep | Centre-left | 2024 |
| Marche | Francesco Acquaroli (1974–) | | 30 September 2020 | 2025–2030 | FdI | Centre-right | 2025 |
| Lazio | Francesco Rocca (1965–) | | 2 March 2023 | 2023–2028 | Indep–FdI | Centre-right | 2023 |
| Abruzzo | Marco Marsilio (1968–) | | 11 February 2019 | 2024–2029 | FdI | Centre-right | 2024 |
| Molise | Francesco Roberti (1967–) | | 6 July 2023 | 2023–2028 | FI | Centre-right | 2023 |
| Campania | Roberto Fico (1974–) | | 9 December 2025 | 2025–2030 | M5S | Centre-left | 2025 |
| Apulia | Antonio Decaro (1970–) | | 7 January 2026 | 2025–2030 | PD | Centre-left | 2025 |
| Basilicata | Vito Bardi (1951–) | | 25 March 2019 | 2024–2029 | FI | Centre-right | 2024 |
| Calabria | Roberto Occhiuto (1969–) | | 29 October 2021 | 2025–2030 | FI | Centre-right | 2025 |
| Sicily | Renato Schifani (1950–) | | 13 October 2022 | 2022–2027 | FI | Centre-right | 2022 |
| Sardinia | Alessandra Todde (1969–) | | 20 March 2024 | 2024–2029 | M5S | Centre-left | 2024 |
Autonomous Provinces (Note: Trentino-Alto Adige/Südtirol is composed of two autonomous provinces, which are individually represented in the Conference of Regions and Autonomous Provinces by their respective president/governor.)
| South Tyrol | Arno Kompatscher (1971–) | | 9 January 2014 | 2023–2028 | SVP | Centre-right | 2023 |
| Trentino | Maurizio Fugatti (1972–) | | 2 November 2018 | 2023–2028 | Lega–LT | Centre-right | 2023 |

== List of presidents ==
This is the list of presidents of the Conference since 1995. Before then, the role was rotational.

| President | Term started | Term ended | Party | Region |
| President | Time in office | | Party | Region |
|---|---|---|---|---|
| Pier Luigi Bersani (1951–) | 1 January 1995 | 1 July 1995 | Democratic Party of the Left | Emilia-Romagna |
| Pier Luigi Bersani (1951–) | 181 days | | Democratic Party of the Left | Emilia-Romagna |
| Alessandra Guerra (1963–) | 2 July 1995 | 23 May 1996 | Lega Nord | Friuli-Venezia Giulia |
| Alessandra Guerra (1963–) | 326 days | | Lega Nord | Friuli-Venezia Giulia |
| Piero Badaloni (1946–) | 23 May 1996 | 16 April 2000 | Independent / The Democrats | Lazio |
| Piero Badaloni (1946–) | 3 years, 329 days | | Independent / The Democrats | Lazio |
| Enzo Ghigo (1953–) | 23 May 2000 | 13 May 2005 | Forza Italia | Piedmont |
| Enzo Ghigo (1953–) | 4 years, 355 days | | Forza Italia | Piedmont |
| Vasco Errani (1955–) | 13 May 2005 | 31 July 2014 | Democrats of the Left / Democratic Party | Emilia-Romagna |
| Vasco Errani (1955–) | 9 years, 79 days | | Democrats of the Left / Democratic Party | Emilia-Romagna |
| Sergio Chiamparino (1948–) | 31 July 2014 | 17 December 2015 | Democratic Party | Piedmont |
| Sergio Chiamparino (1948–) | 1 year, 139 days | | Democratic Party | Piedmont |
| Stefano Bonaccini (1967–) | 17 December 2015 | 9 April 2021 | Democratic Party | Emilia-Romagna |
| Stefano Bonaccini (1967–) | 5 years, 113 days | | Democratic Party | Emilia-Romagna |
| Massimiliano Fedriga (1980–) | 9 April 2021 | Incumbent | Lega | Friuli-Venezia Giulia |
| Massimiliano Fedriga (1980–) | 5 years, 88 days | | Lega | Friuli-Venezia Giulia |

== List of vice presidents ==
| Vice President | Region | Start of term | End of term | Party | President |
|---|---|---|---|---|---|
| Vasco Errani (1955) | Emilia-Romagna | May 23, 2000 | December 12, 2002 | Democrats of the Left | Enzo Ghigo |
| Angelo Michele Iorio (1948) | Molise | December 12, 2002 | March 18, 2013 | Forza Italia; The People of Freedom | Enzo Ghigo |
| Angelo Michele Iorio (1948) | Molise | December 12, 2002 | March 18, 2013 | Forza Italia; The People of Freedom | Vasco Errani |
| Paolo Di Laura Frattura (1962) | Molise | March 18, 2013 | July 31, 2014 | Democratic Party | Vasco Errani |
| Stefano Caldoro (1960) | Campania | July 31, 2014 | July 30, 2015 | New Italian Socialist Party; Forza Italia | Sergio Chiamparino |
| Giovanni Toti (1968) | Liguria | July 30, 2015 | April 9, 2021 | Forza Italia; Cambiamo! | Sergio Chiamparino |
| Giovanni Toti (1968) | Liguria | July 30, 2015 | April 9, 2021 | Forza Italia; Cambiamo! | Stefano Bonaccini |
| Michele Emiliano (1959) | Apulia | April 9, 2021 | in office | Independent of the Democratic Party | Massimiliano Fedriga |

== See also ==
- Regions of Italy
