= 2018 Friuli-Venezia Giulia regional election =

- 29 April 2018

All 49 seats to the Regional Council
- Turnout: 49.65% ▼0.86%
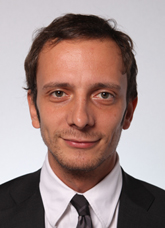

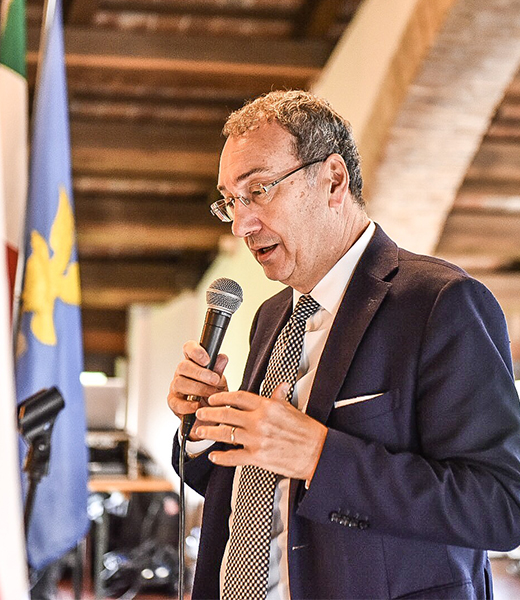

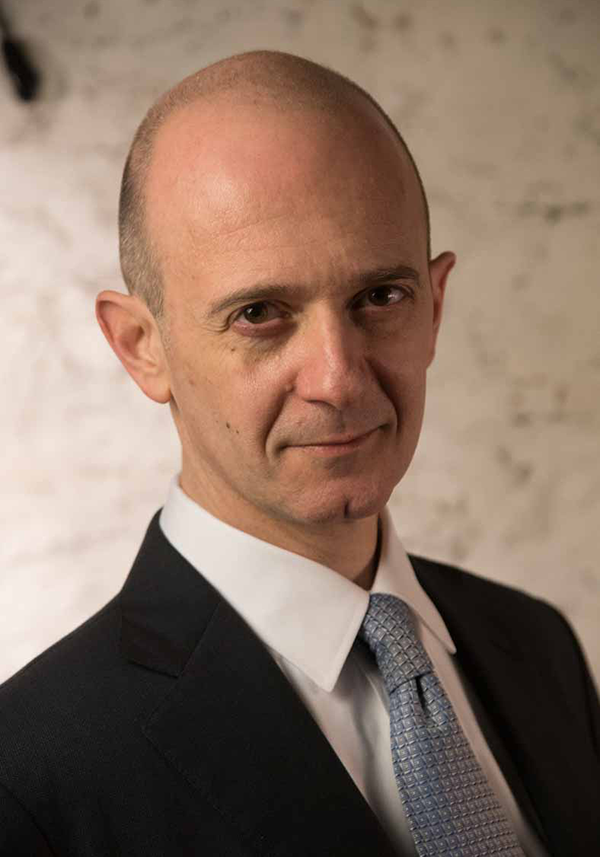
	Majority party	Minority party	Third party
Leader	Massimiliano Fedriga	Sergio Bolzonello	Alessandro Fraleoni Morgera
Party	League	Democratic Party	Five Star Movement
Alliance	Centre-right	Centre-left
Seats won	29	14	4
Seat change	▲12	▼13	▼1
Popular vote	307,123	144,363	62,776
Percentage	57.1%	26.8%	11.7%
Swing	▲18.1%	▼12.6%	▼7.5%
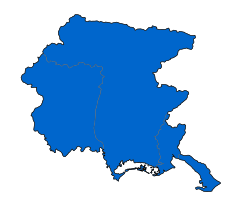
- Map of the results of the regional election. Colors identify the candidate who received a plurality in each province. Blue indicates a Fedriga majority.
Government before election
Serracchiani Cabinet
Centre-left
Government after election
Fedriga Cabinet
Centre-right

The 2018 Friuli-Venezia Giulia regional election took place on 29 April 2018, to elect the President and the Regional council of the Italian autonomous region of Friuli-Venezia Giulia.

The election saw a large victory of the centre-right candidate, Massimiliano Fedriga, with more than 57% of votes and a great showing of the League, followed by the centre-left candidate Sergio Bolzonello, who arrived second with almost 27% of votes, and the Five Star one, who gained less than 12% of votes.

== Background ==
In the 2013 regional election, the centre-left candidate, Debora Serracchiani, a Socialist MEP and regional leader of the Democratic Party (PD), narrowly defeated incumbent Renzo Tondo of The People of Freedom (PdL) 39.39% to 39.00%; Saverio Galluccio of the Five Star Movement (M5S) came third with 19.2% of the vote. Serracchiani was the second woman to hold the office of President of Friuli-Venezia Giulia, after Alessandra Guerra of the Northern League in 1994–1995.

However, in 2017 Serracchiani announced her intention not to seek a re-election and the centre-left selected Sergio Bolzonello, former mayor of Pordenone, as the candidate for the presidency. The centre-right coalition choose Massimiliano Fedriga, a member of the Chamber of Deputies for the League and a close ally of Matteo Salvini, as its candidate; while the Five Star Movement's candidate was Alessandro Fraleoni Morgera, a former member of the right-wing party, National Alliance. The former mayor of Udine, Sergio Cecotti, run as an independent at the head of an autonomist list.

== Parties and candidates ==
Political party or alliance	Constituent lists	Previous result		Candidate
Political party or alliance	Constituent lists	Votes (%)	Seats	Candidate
Centre-right coalition	League (Lega)	8.3	3	Massimiliano Fedriga
Centre-right coalition	Forza Italia (FI)	20.1	8	Massimiliano Fedriga
Centre-right coalition	Brothers of Italy (FdI) (incl. PdF)	—N/a	—N/a	Massimiliano Fedriga
Centre-right coalition	FVG Project	—N/a	—N/a	Massimiliano Fedriga
Centre-right coalition	Responsible Autonomy (AR)	10.7	4	Massimiliano Fedriga
Centre-left coalition	Democratic Party (PD)	26.8	19	Sergio Bolzonello
Centre-left coalition	Citizens for Bolzonello President	5.3	3	Sergio Bolzonello
Centre-left coalition	Open – Left FVG	—N/a	—N/a	Sergio Bolzonello
Centre-left coalition	Slovene Union (SSk)	1.5	1	Sergio Bolzonello
Five Star Movement (M5S)		13.8	5	Alessandro Fraleoni Morgera
Pact for Autonomy (PpA)		—N/a	—N/a	Sergio Cecotti

== Opinion polling ==
This section reports in chronological order the data of the electoral surveys related to this election. The percentages attributed to the candidates are relative to the part of the sample that expresses a voting intention.

View source data.

Date	Polling firm	Fedriga	Bolzonello	Fraleoni Morgera	Cecotti	Undecided	Lead
14 April 2018	SWG	47–51	26–30	18–22	2–4	21	25–17
8 April 2018	Demopolis	45–51	22–28	21–27	1–5	20	29–17

== Results ==
29 April 2018 Friuli-Venezia Giulia regional election results
Candidates	Votes	%	Seats	Parties	Votes	%	Seats
Massimiliano Fedriga	307,123	57.09	1				
Massimiliano Fedriga	307,123	57.09	1	League	147,464	34.87	17
Massimiliano Fedriga	307,123	57.09	1	Forza Italia	51,234	12.11	5
Massimiliano Fedriga	307,123	57.09	1	FVG Project	26,596	6.29	3
Massimiliano Fedriga	307,123	57.09	1	Brothers of Italy	23,128	5.47	2
Massimiliano Fedriga	307,123	57.09	1	Responsible Autonomy	16,802	3.97	1
Massimiliano Fedriga	307,123	57.09	1	Total	265,224	62.71	28
Sergio Bolzonello	144,363	26.84	1				
Sergio Bolzonello	144,363	26.84	1	Democratic Party	76,579	18.11	9
Sergio Bolzonello	144,363	26.84	1	Citizens for Bolzonello President	17,297	4.09	2
Sergio Bolzonello	144,363	26.84	1	Open – Left FVG	11,715	2.77	1
Sergio Bolzonello	144,363	26.84	1	Slovene Union	4,895	1.16	1
Sergio Bolzonello	144,363	26.84	1	Total	110,486	26.12	13
Alessandro Fraleoni Morgera	62,776	11.67	–	Five Star Movement	29,862	7.06	4
Sergio Cecotti	23,696	4.40	–	Pact for Autonomy	17,350	4.10	2
Total candidates	537,958	100.00	2	Total parties	422,922	100.00	47
Source: Region of Friuli-Venezia Giulia.

Popular vote
Lega	34.87%
PD	18.11%
FI	12.11%
M5S	7.06%
PFVG	6.29%
FdI	5.47%
PpA	4.10%
CBP	4.09%
AR	3.97%
O–SFVG	2.77%
SSk	1.16%

President
Fedriga	57.09%
Bolzonello	26.84%
Fraleoni Morgera	11.67%
Cecotti	4.40%

== Analysis ==
Similar to the election in Molise, the M5S lost almost 20% of votes compared to the general election. On March 4, they reached almost 25%, but now just over 7%. By contrast, the centre-right coalition gained more than 20% compared to March 4.

== See also ==
- 2018 Italian general election
- 2018 Molise regional election
