= FVG Project =

FVG Project Progetto FVG
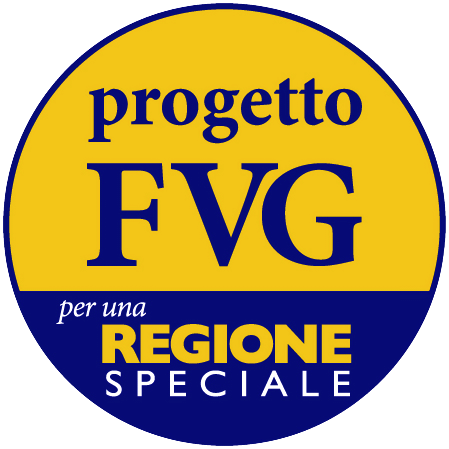
- Abbreviation: PFVG
- president: Mauro Di Bert
- coordinator: Sergio Bini
- Founder: Sergio Bini; Ferruccio Saro
- Founded: 8 April 2017
- Dissolved: 6 February 2023
- Merged into: Fedriga for President
- Headquarters: Trieste
- Ideology: Regionalism; Liberalism
- Political position: Centre-right
- Regional affiliation: Centre-right coalition
- Colors: Gold; Prussian blue
- Slogan: Per una regione Forte, Viva, Grande (lit. 'For a Strong, Living, Great region')

Website
- progettofvg.it

FVG Project (Italian: Progetto FVG, PFVG) was a centre-right political party active in Friuli-Venezia Giulia, Italy.

The party was launched in 2017 and originally led by entrepreneur Sergio Bini, Ferruccio Saro and Marco Pottino. Saro was a former member of the Italian Socialist Party, Forza Italia and the People of Freedom, while Pottino was a former leader of Lega Nord Friuli-Venezia Giulia. The party was long led by Mauro Di Bert as president and Sergio Bini as coordinator.

In the 2018 Friuli-Venezia Giulia regional election, the party obtained 6.3% of the vote and three regional councillors. Subsequently, Bini was appointed regional minister of Productive Activities and Tourism in the government led by Massimiliano Fedriga of Lega FVG. In the Regional Council, PFVG formed a joint group with Responsible Autonomy, a regional liberal-conservative party.

In the run-up of the 2023 Friuli-Venezia Giulia regional election, Bini decided to dissolve the FVG Project and merge into "Fedriga for President", the civic list supporting Fedriga. Two FVG Project members, Di Bert and Edy Morandini, were re-elected to the Regional Council.

== Electoral results ==
=== Regional elections ===
Election	Votes	%	Seats	+/–
2018	26,596	6.3	3 / 49	New

== Leadership ==
- President: Mauro Di Bert (2017–2023)
- Coordinator: Sergio Bini (2017–2023)
