= Trieste (Chamber of Deputies electoral district) =

Friuli-Venezia Giulia - 01 (Trieste)
- Former uninominal district for the Chamber of Deputies
- Region: Friuli-Venezia Giulia
- Population: 219 485
- Major settlements: Trieste

Former uninominal district
- Created: 2017
- Abolished: 2020
- Party: Us with Italy
- Member: Renzo Tondo
- Elected: 2018

The Trieste electoral district (official name: Friuli-Venezia Giulia - 01 uninominal district) was an uninominal district for the Chamber of Deputies.

== Territory ==
As required by law, it was part of the Friuli-Venezia Giulia electoral constituency.

The Trieste-district was composed by three comuni: Trieste, Muggia and San Dorligo della Valle.

It was part of the Friuli-Venezia Giulia - 01 plurinominal district.

== Elected ==
Election	Deputy	Party
2018	Renzo Tondo	Us with Italy

== Electoral results ==
2018 general election: Trieste
Party	Candidate	Votes	%	±%
Us with Italy	Renzo Tondo	45 506	38,17	New
Democratic Party	Debora Serracchiani	30 909	25,93	New
Five Star Movement	Vincenzo Zoccano	30 875	25,90	New
Free and Equal	Fabio Omero	4 861	4,08	New
Power to the People	Gianluca Paciucci	1 850	1,55	New
New Force	Almerigo Esposito	1 097	1,02	New
CasaPound	Fabio Esposito	1 040	0,96	New

Candidates	Party	Votes	%
Renzo Tondo	Lega Nord FVG	24 949	20,93
Renzo Tondo	Forza Italia	12 581	10,55
Renzo Tondo	Brothers of Italy	6 939	5,82
Renzo Tondo	Us with Italy-UDC	1 037	0,87
Debora Serracchiani	Democratic Party	24 133	20,24
Debora Serracchiani	More Europe	5 432	4,56
Debora Serracchiani	Italy Europe Together	740	0,62
Debora Serracchiani	Popular Civic	604	0,51
Vincenzo Zoccano	Five Star Movement	30 875	25,90
Fabio Omero	Free and Equal	4 861	4,08
Gianluca Paciucci	Power to the People	1 850	1,55
Almerigo Esposito	Italy for the Italians	1 203	1,01
Fabio Esposito	CasaPound	1 123	0,95
Others	Others	2 872	2,41
