= Friulian Autonomist Movement =

The Friulian Autonomist Movement (Movimento Autonomista Friulano, MAF) was a regionalist political party active in Friuli, Italy.

== History ==
The party was founded in 2008 by a promoting committee made up of 9 people, including engineer Valeria Grillo, who became leader of the party.

In the 2013 Udine provincial election the MAF supported Pietro Fontanini (Northern League) for president and won 2.1% of the vote, which was crucial for Fontanini's re-election in the first round. In the regional election of the same year, Valeria Grillo was a candidate into the Responsible Autonomy list.

== Leadership ==
- President: Valeria Grillo (2008–present)
- Vice President: Giancarlo Hosmer (2008–present)
- Secretary: Luca Vicario (2008–present)
