= Giuseppe Ferruccio Saro =

Italian politician (born 1951)

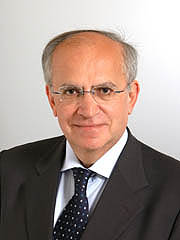

Member of the Italian Chamber of Deputies
- In office 2001–2006

Member of the Senate of the Republic
- In office 2006–2013

Personal details
- Born: 21 April 1951 (age 74) Udine
- Political party: Italian Socialist Party; Forza Italia; The People of Freedom

Giuseppe Ferruccio Saro (born 21 April 1951) is an Italian politician.

== Political career ==
Saro served as Mayor of Martignacco from 1975 to 1985. He was subsequently Regional Councilor of the Friuli-Venezia Giulia from 1983 to 2001.

From 1988 to 1992 he also was Regional assessor for Industry. From 14 January 1992 to 4 August 1993 he served as vice president of Friuli-Venezia Giulia and as assessor for Industry in the regional government led by Vinicio Turello. Since 22 March 1993 he served as Regional assessor for Labor, Cooperation and Crafts.

He was chairman in the regional council and regional secretary of the Italian Socialist Party from 1985 to 1992. Subsequently he was chairman of the Forza Italia group in the regional council from 1998 to 2001.

He was elected Deputy among the ranks of Forza Italia in Friuli-Giulia in the 2001 general election.

In 2003 he was candidate for president of the Friuli-Venezia Giulia region in the regional elections with Freedom and Autonomy (Italian: Libertà e Autonomia), a list founded in disagreement with the centre-right coalition following Forza Italia's choice to support the candidacy of the Northern League's Alessandra Guerra instead of the incumbent president of the Region, Renzo Tondo. However, Saro's candidacy only got 3.51% of the votes, without being elected, while Freedom and Autonomy scored just 2.81% of the votes.

At the 2006 general election he was elected Senator for the Movement for Autonomy, in Liguria. In 2008 he was re-confirmed to the Senate among the ranks of The People of Freedom.

Subsequently he became coordinator of FVG Project (Progetto FVG), however he was excluded from the party in 2019 by the founder Sergio Bini.

In 2020 is the founder of the "Future Region Movement" (Movimento Regione Futura, MFR).
