= Friuli Movement =

Friuli Movement Movimento Friuli
- Leader: Marco de Agostini
- Founded: 1966
- Headquarters: Largo San Grisogomo 14, Grado
- Newspaper: Friuli d'Oggi
- Ideology: Regionalism; Autonomism

Website
- www.movimentofriuli.it

The Friuli Movement (Friulian: Moviment Friûl; Italian: Movimento Friuli; MF) is a regionalist political party in Friuli, Italy.

The party, founded in 1966, is still active, but has lost importance. Most of its former members, notably including Roberto Visentin, Pietro Fontanini, Sergio Cecotti, Rinaldo Bosco and Alessandra Guerra, left to join Lega Nord Friuli, which was formed in 1990–1991. As of today, the party has little organisation and usually does not participate in elections.

== History ==
In 1966 a group of Friulian nationalists led by Gino di Caporiacco, Fausto Schiavi and Corrado Cecotto, who benefited from the convinced support of part of the Catholic clergy, launched the Friuli Movement, in order to represent Friulian autonomism in the newly-formed autonomous region of Friuli-Venezia Giulia, composed of Friuli and Venezia Giulia.

The party was represented in the Regional Council of Friuli-Venezia Giulia from 1968 to 1993 and, again, from 1998 to 2003. Its best electoral result was in the 1968 regional election (the first after its foundation), when the MF won 5.1% of the vote (more than 10% in the province of Udine, especially in Carnia) and three regional councillors. In the 1980s the party suffered a decline in term of votes and it was later replaced by Lega Nord Friuli, which was much more successful.

In the 2003 regional election the MF externally supported the candidacy of Alessandra Guerra for President, while five years later it gave its support to the centre-left incumbent President Riccardo Illy. In both cases, the candidate supported by the MF was defeated. In 1998 the party, under the "Friuli Union" banner, obtained 3.6% and one seat.

Since 1992 the party has been conducted by Marco De Agostini (secretary) and Adriano Ceschia (president).

Roberto Visentin, who left in 1990 to form Lega Nord Friuli, returned to the party in 2012 and was supposed to lead it in the 2013 regional election, to which the party finally did not take part. During the election, the alternative Friulian Autonomist Movement ran within the Responsible Autonomy list.

In 2016 the MF celebrated its 50th anniversary, during which its leaders hinted an electoral comeback under the leadership of Sergio Cecotti.
