= 2003 Friuli-Venezia Giulia regional election =

- 8–9 June 2003

All 60 seats of the Regional Council
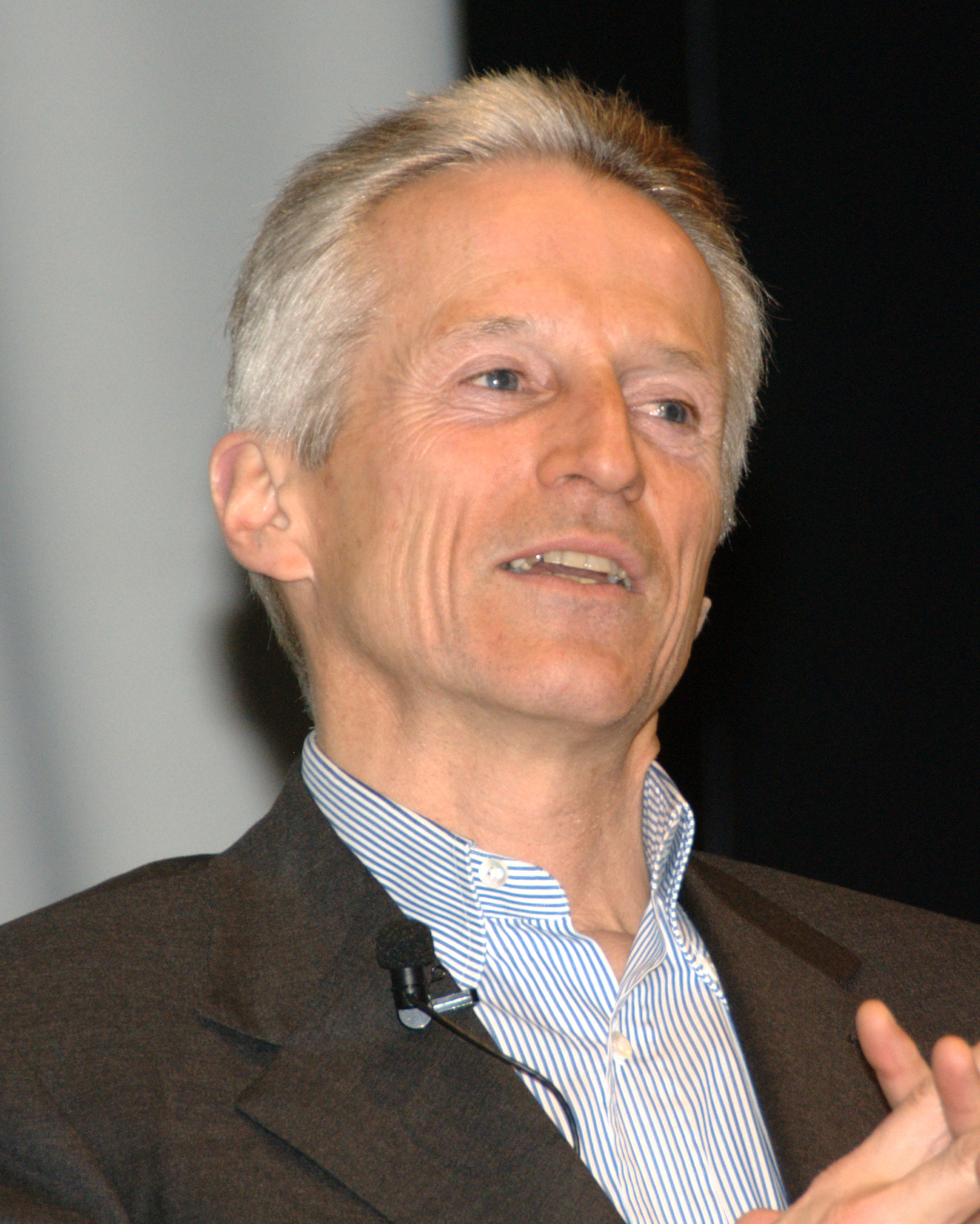

	Majority party	Minority party
Leader	Riccardo Illy	Alessandra Guerra
Party	Independent	Northern League
Alliance	The Olive Tree	House of Freedoms
Seats won	37	23
Popular vote	356,908	290,398
Percentage	53.16%	43.26
President before election
Renzo Tondo
Forza Italia
President-elect
Riccardo Illy
Independent

The 2003 Friuli-Venezia Giulia regional election took place on 8 June 2003.

Riccardo Illy, a centre-left independent, who had been Mayor of Trieste, defeated Alessandra Guerra, leading member of the Northern League.

== Results ==
8–9 June 2003 Friuli-Venezia Giulia regional election results
Candidates	Votes	%	Seats	Parties	Votes	%	Seats
Riccardo Illy	356,908	53.16	6				
Riccardo Illy	356,908	53.16	6	Democrats of the Left	82,878	16.66	10
Riccardo Illy	356,908	53.16	6	Democracy is Freedom – The Daisy (incl. SSk, SDI)	73,547	14.78	9
Riccardo Illy	356,908	53.16	6	Citizens for the President	37,431	7.53	5
Riccardo Illy	356,908	53.16	6	Communist Refoundation Party	24,835	4.99	3
Riccardo Illy	356,908	53.16	6	Italy of Values	7,487	1.50	1
Riccardo Illy	356,908	53.16	6	Party of Italian Communists	7,448	1.50	1
Riccardo Illy	356,908	53.16	6	Federation of the Greens	7,088	1.43	1
Riccardo Illy	356,908	53.16	6	Pensioners' Party	5,751	1.16	1
Riccardo Illy	356,908	53.16	6	Union of Democrats for Europe	3,645	0.73	–
Riccardo Illy	356,908	53.16	6	Total	250,119	50.28	37
Alessandra Guerra	290,398	43.26	1				
Alessandra Guerra	290,398	43.26	1	Forza Italia	107,522	21.61	11
Alessandra Guerra	290,398	43.26	1	National Alliance	57,924	11.65	5
Alessandra Guerra	290,398	43.26	1	Northern League Friuli-Venezia Giulia	46,408	9.33	4
Alessandra Guerra	290,398	43.26	1	Union of Christian and Centre Democrats	21,508	4.32	2
Alessandra Guerra	290,398	43.26	1	Total	233,323	46.90	23
Ferruccio Saro	24,040	3.58	–	Freedom and Autonomy	14,035	2.82	–
Total candidates	671,336	100.00	7	Total parties	497,492	100.00	53
Source: Region of Friuli-Venezia Giulia – Elections
