= 1983 Friuli-Venezia Giulia regional election =

The 1983 Friuli-Venezia Giulia regional election took place on 26 June 1983.

== Events ==
Christian Democracy was by far the largest party, largely ahead of the Italian Communist Party which came second. After the election Antonio Comelli, the incumbent Christian Democratic President, formed a government with the Italian Socialist Party, the Italian Democratic Socialist Party, the Italian Republican Party and the Italian Liberal Party (Pentapartito). In 1984 Comelli was replaced by fellow Christian Democrat Adriano Biasutti.

== Results ==
Party	votes	votes (%)	seats
Christian Democracy	290,714	34.2	23
Italian Communist Party	184,492	21.7	14
Italian Socialist Party	96,078	11.3	7
List for Trieste	48,342	5.7	4
Italian Democratic Socialist Party	48,342	5.7	3
Italian Social Movement	46,317	5.5	3
Italian Republican Party	39,812	4.7	3
Friuli Movement	36,820	4.3	2
Italian Liberal Party	18,431	2.2	1
Proletarian Democracy	12,903	1.5	1
Slovene Union	10,467	1.2	1
Others	16,495	1.9	-
Total	849,376	100.0	62

Sources: Istituto Cattaneo and Cjargne Online
