= Arnaldo Pittoni =

Italian politician (1927–2004)

President of the Regional Council of Friuli-Venezia Giulia
- In office 4 December 1974 – 30 November 1978
- Preceded by: Alfredo Berzanti
- Succeeded by: Mario Colli

Personal details
- Born: 19 November 1927 Trieste, Kingdom of Italy
- Died: 11 May 2004 (aged 76) Trieste, Italy
- Party: Italian Socialist Party

Arnaldo Pittoni (19 November 1927 – 11 May 2004) was an Italian politician of the Italian Socialist Party. He served as president of the Regional Council of Friuli-Venezia Giulia from 1974 to 1978.

== Life and career ==
Born in Trieste, Pittoni was active in the Trieste federation of the Italian Socialist Party and held several positions within the Regional Council of Friuli-Venezia Giulia, including that of vice president, during the early 1970s.

On 4 December 1974, he was elected president of the Regional Council, succeeding Alfredo Berzanti. He served until 16 July 1976, when he was immediately re-elected for a second consecutive term. He remained in office until 30 November 1978, when he was succeeded by Mario Colli.

Pittoni died in Trieste on 11 May 2004 at the age of 76.
