= 1978 Friuli-Venezia Giulia regional election =

The 1978 Friuli-Venezia Giulia regional election took place on 25 June 1978.

== Events ==
Christian Democracy was by far the largest party, largely ahead of the Italian Communist Party which came second. The regionalist parties, Friuli Movement, Slovene Union and the recently formed List for Trieste (which stole many votes from the mainstream social-democratic parties), had a total score of more than 10% for the first time.

After the election Antonio Comelli, the incumbent Christian Democratic president, formed a one-party government. In 1980 he managed to enlarge his cabinet to the Italian Socialist Party, the Italian Democratic Socialist Party, the Italian Republican Party and the Italian Liberal Party (Pentapartito).

== Results ==
Party	votes	votes (%)	seats
Christian Democracy	332,684	39.6	26
Italian Communist Party	182,845	21.8	14
Italian Socialist Party	79,656	9.5	5
List for Trieste	54,682	6.5	4
Italian Democratic Socialist Party	41,979	5.0	3
Friuli Movement	38,238	4.6	2
Italian Social Movement	35,084	4.2	2
Italian Republican Party	19,716	2.3	1
Proletarian Democracy	11,184	1.3	1
Italian Liberal Party	10,575	1.3	1
Slovene Union	9,481	1.1	1
Others		0.9	-
Total	840,126	100.0	60

Sources: Istituto Cattaneo and Cjargne Online
