= 1973 Friuli-Venezia Giulia regional election =

The 1973 Friuli-Venezia Giulia regional election took place on 17 June 1973.

== Events ==
Christian Democracy was by far the largest party, largely ahead of the Italian Communist Party which came second. After the election Christian Democrat Antonio Comelli formed a government with the Italian Socialist Party (which left in 1975), the Italian Democratic Socialist Party and the Italian Republican Party.

== Results ==
Party	votes	votes (%)	seats
Christian Democracy	315,198	39.7	26
Italian Communist Party	166,108	20.9	13
Italian Socialist Party	97,259	12.3	8
Italian Democratic Socialist Party	64,259	8.2	4
Italian Social Movement	59,585	7.5	4
Italian Liberal Party	28,883	3.6	2
Friuli Movement	23,648	3.0	2
Italian Republican Party	21,306	2.7	1
Slovene Union	10,185	1.3	1
Others	6,752	0.9	-
Total	919,719	100.0	60

Sources: Istituto Cattaneo and Cjargne Online
