= Lega Friuli-Venezia Giulia =

- Leader: Massimiliano Fedriga
- Secretary: Marco Dreosto
- Founded: 1990
- Split from: Friuli Movement
- Ideology: Regionalism; Federalism; Populism
- National affiliation: Lega Nord (1991–2020); Lega per Salvini Premier (2020–present)
- Regional Council: 13 / 48 (2023)
- Chamber of Deputies (FVG seats): 3 / 8 (2022)
- Senate (FVG seats): 1 / 4 (2022)

Party flag

Lega Friuli-Venezia Giulia (English: League Friuli–Julian March), whose complete name is Lega Friuli-Venezia Giulia per Salvini Premier (English: "League Friuli–Julian March for Salvini [as] Premier"), is a regionalist political party active in Friuli-Venezia Giulia. The party was a "national" section of Lega Nord (LN) from 1991 to 2020 and has been the regional section of Lega per Salvini Premier (LSP) in Friuli-Venezia Giulia since 2020.

The party is currently led by Marco Dreosto. Its leading member is Massimiliano Fedriga, President of Friuli-Venezia Giulia since 2018.

== History ==
The party was established in 1990 as Lega Friuli by a group of leading members of the Friuli Movement, including Roberto Visentin, Pietro Fontanini, Rinaldo Bosco, Sergio Cecotti and Alessandra Guerra. After that the Friuli Movement decided not join Lega Nord, they formed Lega Friuli in order to join. Visentin was the founding and longstanding leader of the party until 1999, before leaving it altogether in 2001.

LNF members were President or Vice President of the Region (1993–2003), President of the province of Pordenone (1995–1999), President of the province of Udine (1995–1999), mayor of Pordenone (1993–2001) and mayor of Udine (1998–2003). The party was the region's largest at the 1993 regional election (26.7%) and the 1996 general election (23.2%).

In 2001 Lega Nord Friuli was merged with Lega Nord Trieste to form a united regional section. At the time the party suffered many splits and a strong decline in term of votes, especially if compared to neighbouring Liga Veneta.

In the 2003 regional election Guerra was candidate for President of the House of Freedoms coalition. She was defeated by Riccardo Illy and the party gained only 9.3% of the vote. Between 2001 and 2007 Visentin, Bosco, Cecotti, Fontanini, Guerra, Giuseppe Zoppolato (national secretary from 2000 to 2003) and Marco Pottino (national secretary from 2005 to 2007) left or were ejected in party struggles. Guerra joined the Democratic Party in 2009, later switched to the Federation of the Greens and finally joined the left-wing, pacifist Peace Land Dignity list for the 2024 EP election.

In 2007 Fontanini was re-integrated in the party and in 2008 he was elected President of the Province of Udine and national secretary of the LNFVG. This represented a sort of return to normality for the party, which won 13.0% of the vote in the general election. At the 2009 European Parliament election the party won 17.5% of the vote, its best score in more than a decade. Moreover, from 2008 to 2013 the party was part of the regional government led by Renzo Tondo of The People of Freedom.

In 2012 Fontanini, who was not able to unite a party divided in too many factions (notably including those led by Claudio Violino and Enzo Bortolotti), stepped down from national secretary. Matteo Piasente was elected in his place with the support of the 58.8% of delegates during a party congress. Fontanini, who grudgingly favoured Piasente, did not even take part to the congress, but nevertheless continued to be a leading member.

In the 2013 regional election the LNFVG obtained a mere 8.3% of the vote and just three regional councillors, due to Tondo's defeat.

Soon after an expenses scandal, involving Regional Council floor leaders Danilo Narduzzi and Mara Piccin, emerged and the party looked increasingly divided among supporters of Piasente, including Violino and Narduzzi (who promptly resigned from deputy national secretary), Massimiliano Fedriga and Fontanini, who asked Piasente to resign. He actually stepped down in late June and was replaced by commissioner Gianpaolo Dozzo, who strove to preserve party unity.

In 2014, at a congress in Udine, Fedriga was unanimously elected national secretary, the first hailing from the Venetian-speaking Trieste in party's history.

In 2015–2017 Cecotti and Visentin were founding members of the centre-left Pact for Autonomy. Visentin would also become president of the Autonomies and Environment Pact, a network of regionalist and green parties, and vice president of the European Free Alliance.

In the 2018 regional election Fedriga was elected President with 57.1% of the vote and the party obtained 34.9% of the vote.

In the 2023 regional election Fedriga was re-elected President with 64.2% of the vote and the combined score of the party's list and Fedriga's personal list was 36.8%.

== Popular support ==
In the 2018 regional election the party obtained its best result ever: 34.9% of the vote. The party's strongholds are Carnia (46.5%), which is part of the province of Udine (34.2%, without Carnia, which forms a separate constituency), and the province of Pordenone (36.7%).

The electoral results of Lega Nord in the region are shown in the tables below.

1992 general	1993 regional	1994 general	1996 general	1998 regional	1999 European	2001 general	2003 regional	2004 European	2006 general	2008 general	2009 European
15.3	26.7	16.9	23.2	17.3	10.1	8.2	9.3	8.5	7.2	13.0	17.5

2013 general	2013 regional	2014 European	2018 general	2018 regional	2019 European	2022 general	2023 regional	2024 European
6.7	8.3	9.3	25.8	34.9	42.6	11.0	36.8 (Note: Combined result of party list and Fedriga's personal list.)	14.9

== Election results ==
Chamber of Deputies
Election year	Votes	%	Seats	+/-
1992	137,201 (3rd)	16.78	3 / 15	▲3
1994	150,250 (2nd)	16.92	6 / 13	▲3
1996	195,616 (1st)	23.19	4 / 13	▼2
2001	66,252 (5th)	8.24	2 / 13	▼2
2006	58,030 (4th)	7.17	1 / 13	▼1
2008	99,540 (3rd)	13.04	2 / 13	▲1
2013	48,310 (5th)	6.70	1 / 13	▼1
2018	178,194 (1st)	25.86	4 / 13	▲3
2022	64,086 (3rd)	10.95	3 / 8	▼1

Senate of the Republic
Election year	Votes	%	Seats	+/-
1992	112,638 (3rd)	14.51	1 / 7	▲1
1994	with PdL		3 / 7	▲2
1996	180,493 (3rd)	24.13	2 / 7	▼1
2001	with CdL		1 / 7	▼1
2006	53,737 (5th)	7.12	1 / 7	-
2008	92,852 (3rd)	13.02	1 / 7	-
2013	46,740 (5th)	6.94	0 / 7	▼1
2018	164,105 (1st)	25.49	2 / 7	▲2
2022	64,525 (3rd)	10.89	1 / 4	▼1

Regional Council
Election year	Votes	%	Seats	+/-
1993	212,423 (1st)	26.67	18 / 60	▲18
1998	114,186 (2nd)	17.36	12 / 60	▼6
2003	46,409 (5th)	9.33	4 / 60	▼8
2008	73,239 (3rd)	12.93	8 / 57	▲4
2013	33,047 (5th)	8.28	3 / 49	▼5
2018	147,340 (1st)	34.91	17 / 49	▲14
2023	75,117 (1st); 70,192 (3rd)	19.02 (party list); 17.77 (Fedriga list)	18 / 49	▲1

== Leadership ==
- Secretary: Roberto Visentin (1990–1999), Edouard Ballaman (1999–2000), Giuseppe Zoppolato (2000–2003), Fulvio Follegot (2003–2005), Marco Pottino (2005–2007), Manuela Dal Lago (commissioner, 2007–2008), Pietro Fontanini (2008–2012), Matteo Piasente (2012–2013), Gianpaolo Dozzo (commissioner, 2013–2014), Massimiliano Fedriga (2014–2019), Vannia Gava (commissioner, 2019–2020), Marco Dreosto (2020–present, commissioner 2020–2023)
- President: Rinaldo Bosco (1991–2003), Alessandra Guerra (2005–2007), Enzo Bortolotti (2008–2012), Fulvio Follegot (2012–2015), Mario Pittoni (2016–2020)
