= 1988 Friuli-Venezia Giulia regional election =

The 1988 Friuli-Venezia Giulia regional election took place on 26–27 June 1988.

== Events ==
Christian Democracy was by far the largest party, largely ahead of the Italian Socialist Party and the Italian Communist Party. After the election Adriano Biasutti, the incumbent Christian Democratic president, formed a government with the Italian Socialist Party, the Italian Democratic Socialist Party and the Italian Republican Party. In 1992 Biasutti was replaced by fellow Christian Democrat Vinicio Turello.

== Results ==
Party	votes	votes (%)	seats
Christian Democracy	360,208	37.2	24
Italian Socialist Party	145,892	17.7	12
Italian Communist Party	144,668	17.5	11
Italian Social Movement	45,417	5.5	3
Italian Democratic Socialist Party	32,780	4.0	2
Green List	32,475	4.0	2
List for Trieste	23,476	2.9	2
Italian Republican Party	21,264	2.6	1
Rainbow Greens	17,571	2.1	1
Friuli Movement	14,144	1.7	1
Italian Liberal Party	13,521	1.6	1
Proletarian Democracy	11,109	1.3	1
Slovene Union	8,678	1.1	1
Others	6,463	0.8	-
Total	823,576	100.0	62

Sources: Istituto Cattaneo and Cjargne Online
