= Marco Dreosto =

Italian politician

Marco Dreosto MEP
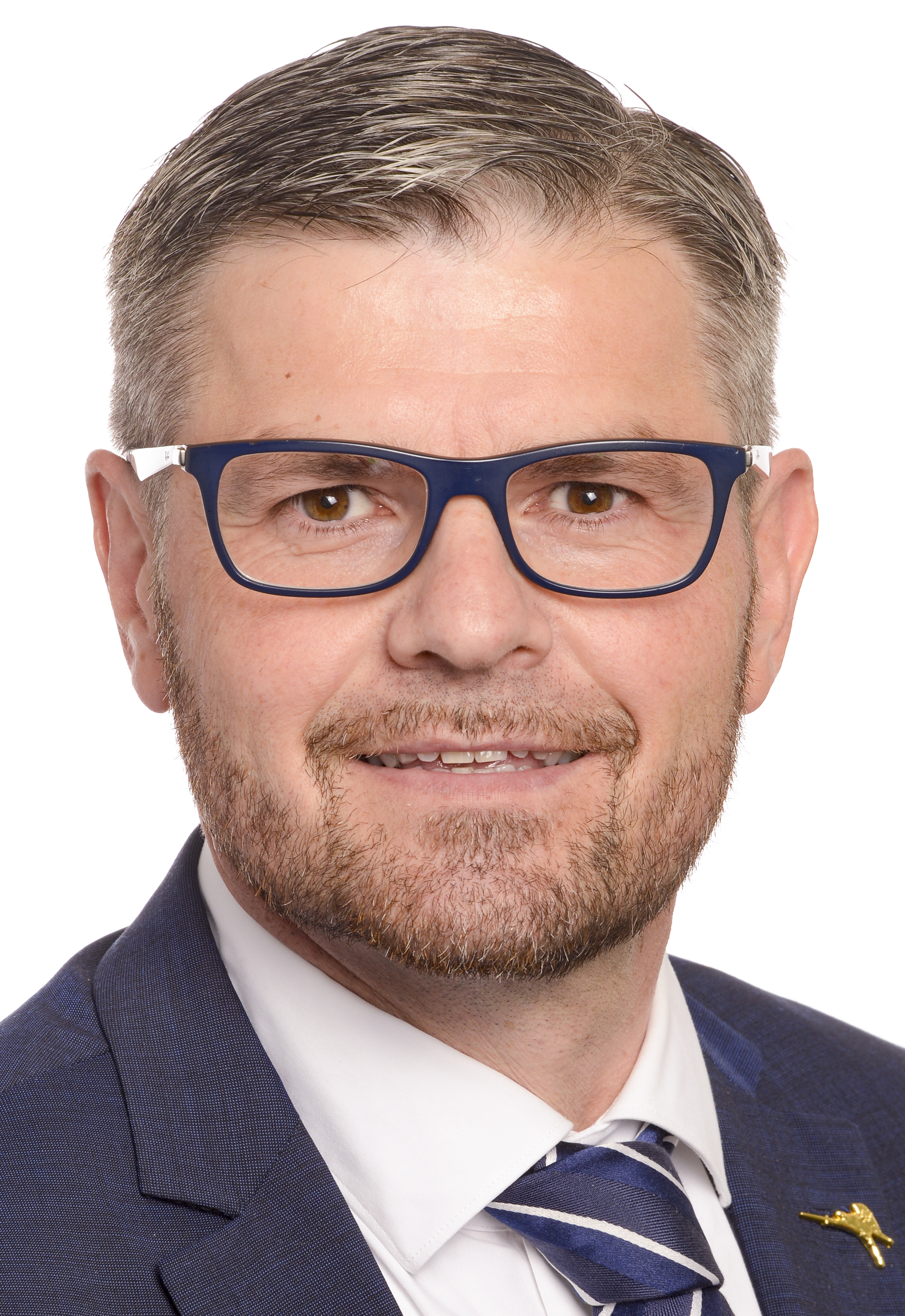

Member of the European Parliament for North-East Italy
- Incumbent
- Assumed office 2 July 2019

Personal details
- Party: League

Marco Dreosto (born 18 March 1969 in Spilimbergo) is an Italian politician. He has been a Member of the European Parliament since 2 July 2019 elected with the Salvini Premier Lega party in the north-eastern constituency (Friuli-Venezia Giulia, Veneto, Trentino Alto Adige, Emilia-Romagna) following the 2019 European elections where he got 23,179 votes.

== Biography ==
Dreosto was born in Spilimbergo in the province of Pordenone, where he still lives with his family. After his studies in marketing, he began his professional career in the marketing and communication sector by becoming a manager for one of Italy's most important company in the automotive sector.

== Political Activity ==
Since 2008, he has held the positions of municipal councillor and assessor in the municipality of Spilimbergo, delegate councillor in the mountain community of Western Friuli, deputy mayor of the city of Mosaic and vice president of the Assembly of Assistance District North of Friuli-Venezia Giulia. He has also been the group leader of the Lega party since 2018 in the municipality of Spilimbergo until the election as MEP, which took place on 26 May 2019, for Lega Salvini Premier delegation, joining the Identity and Democracy (ID) group. Within the European Parliament, he is a member of the Environment, Public Health and Food Safety Commission (ENVI), of the Industry, Research and Energy Commission (ITRE), as well as the delegations to the Parliamentary Stabilization and Association Committee EU-Montenegro and EU-Serbia. In particular, he is rapporteur for the "ID - Identity and Democracy" group for the report on the proposal for a decision of the European Parliament and of the Council amending decision no. 1313/2013 / EU of the European Parliament and of the Council on a Union Civil Protection Mechanism and is shadow rapporteur of the "Proposal for a Regulation of the European Parliament and of the Council establishing a Recovery and Resilience Facility". He is also shadow rapporteur on the Opinion on the investment plan for a sustainable Europe - How to finance the Green Deal and on the draft resolution on the Implementation of EU water legislation Dreosto is also vice-president of the intergroup on biodiversity, hunting, rural areas, a member of the intergroup on the persecution of Christians around the world, a member of the intergroup on wine, spirits and food products and a member of the disability intergroup. In the European Parliament, he is particularly active in supporting various causes related to food security, agriculture and livestock, as well as foreign policy and immigration issues, in particular the issue of the Balkan route.
