= 1964 Friuli-Venezia Giulia regional election =

The 1964 Friuli-Venezia Giulia regional election took place on 10 May 1964. It was the first election ever. Proportional representation was used.

== Events ==
Christian Democracy was by far the largest party, largely ahead of the Italian Communist Party which came second. After the election Christian Democrat Alfredo Berzanti formed a government which included the Italian Democratic Socialist Party and, since 1966, also the Italian Socialist Party and the Italian Republican Party (organic Centre-left).

== Results ==
Party	votes	votes (%)	seats
Christian Democracy	327,081	43.1	28
Italian Communist Party	140,845	18.6	11
Italian Socialist Party	81,153	10.7	7
Italian Democratic Socialist Party	70,205	9.3	6
Italian Liberal Party	46,700	6.2	3
Italian Social Movement	46,538	6.1	3
Italian Socialist Party of Proletarian Unity	20,156	2.7	1
Slovene Union	10,009	1.3	1
Italian Republican Party	6,799	0.9	1
Others	9,430	1.3	-
Total	758,916	100.0	60

Sources: Istituto Cattaneo and Cjargne Online
