= Renzo Travanut =

Italian politician (1946–2026)

Renzo Travanut (1 April 1946 – 23 April 2026) was an Italian politician.

== Life and career ==
Travanut was born in Aquileia on 1 April 1946. He was a member of the Italian Communist Party before joining the Democratic Party of the Left. He was a regional councillor in Friuli-Venezia Giulia and held the position of president of the Region from January to July 1994. He sat again on the regional council from 1998 to 2003.

In May 2013, he was appointed regional secretary of the Democratic Party, replacing Debora Serracchiani, remaining at the helm of the Friulian democrats until February 2014.

Travanut died on 23 April 2026, at the age of 80.
