= Lega Nord Trieste =

- Secretary: Fabrizio Belloni (last)
- President: Federica Seganti (last)
- Founded: 1991
- Dissolved: 2001
- Merged into: Lega Nord Friuli-Venezia Giulia
- Ideology: Federalism; Regionalism
- National affiliation: Lega Nord

Lega Nord Trieste (English: Northern League Trieste) was a regionalist political party in Italy. It was the provincial section of Lega Nord in the Province of Trieste, before merging into Lega Nord Friuli-Venezia Giulia in 2001.

The longstanding leader of the party was Fabrizio Belloni, a keen independentist, who later left Lega Nord and became a harsh critic of Umberto Bossi.

The main reasons for having a separate party from Lega Nord Friuli was that Trieste, capital city of Friuli-Venezia Giulia, had a very different history from Friuli (see Free Territory of Trieste) and that Trieste's culture is slightly different from that of Friuli, as the spoken language in Trieste is not Friulian, which is spoken essentially in the Province of Udine, but Venetian, which is however spoken also in parts of the Province of Gorizia and the Province of Pordenone.

The party was never strong as its counterpart Lega Nord Friuli and obtained its best results from 1992 to 1996, when it gained 7-8% in the Province. In 2001, as the party was so small and found difficult to continue to have different party organization and structure, it was merged with Lega Nord Friuli into Lega Nord Friuli-Venezia Giulia.

== Popular support ==
Municipal Council
Election year	Votes	%	Seats	+/-
1992	14,727 (4th)	9.59	5 / 50	▲5
1993	29,937 (1th)	25.19	6 / 40	▲1
1997	4,190 (6th)	4.39	1 / 40	▼5
2001	1,199 (8th)	1.41	0 / 40	▼1

== Leadership ==
- National Secretary: Fabrizio Belloni (1991–1994), Roberto Tanfani (1994–1996), Massimiliano Coos (1996–1997), Fabrizio Belloni (1997–2001)
- National President: unknown (1991–1994), Fabrizio Belloni (1994–1997), Federica Seganti (1997–2001)
