= 2013 Friuli-Venezia Giulia regional election =

- 21–22 April 2013

All 49 seats of the Regional Council
- Turnout: 50.51%
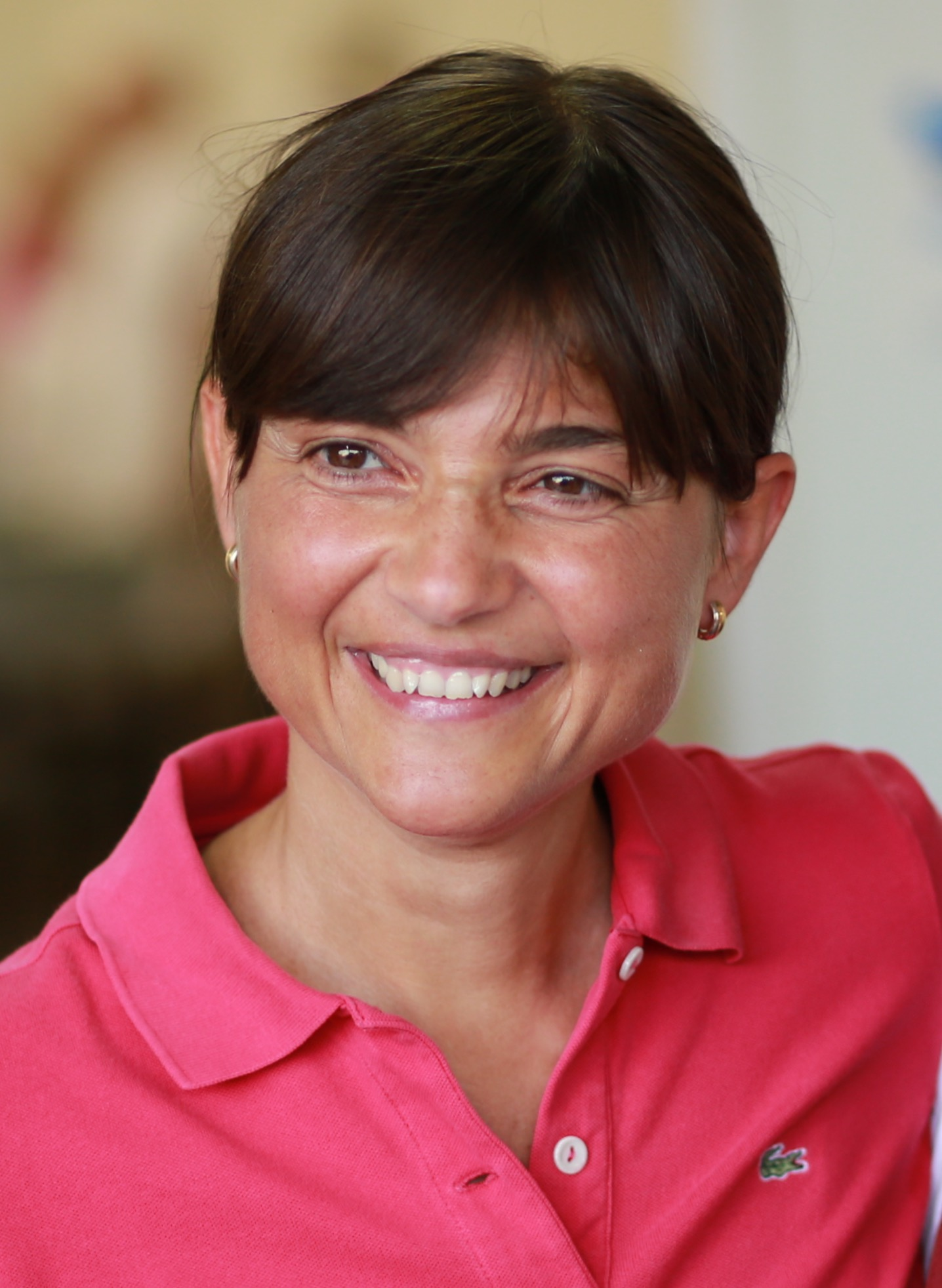

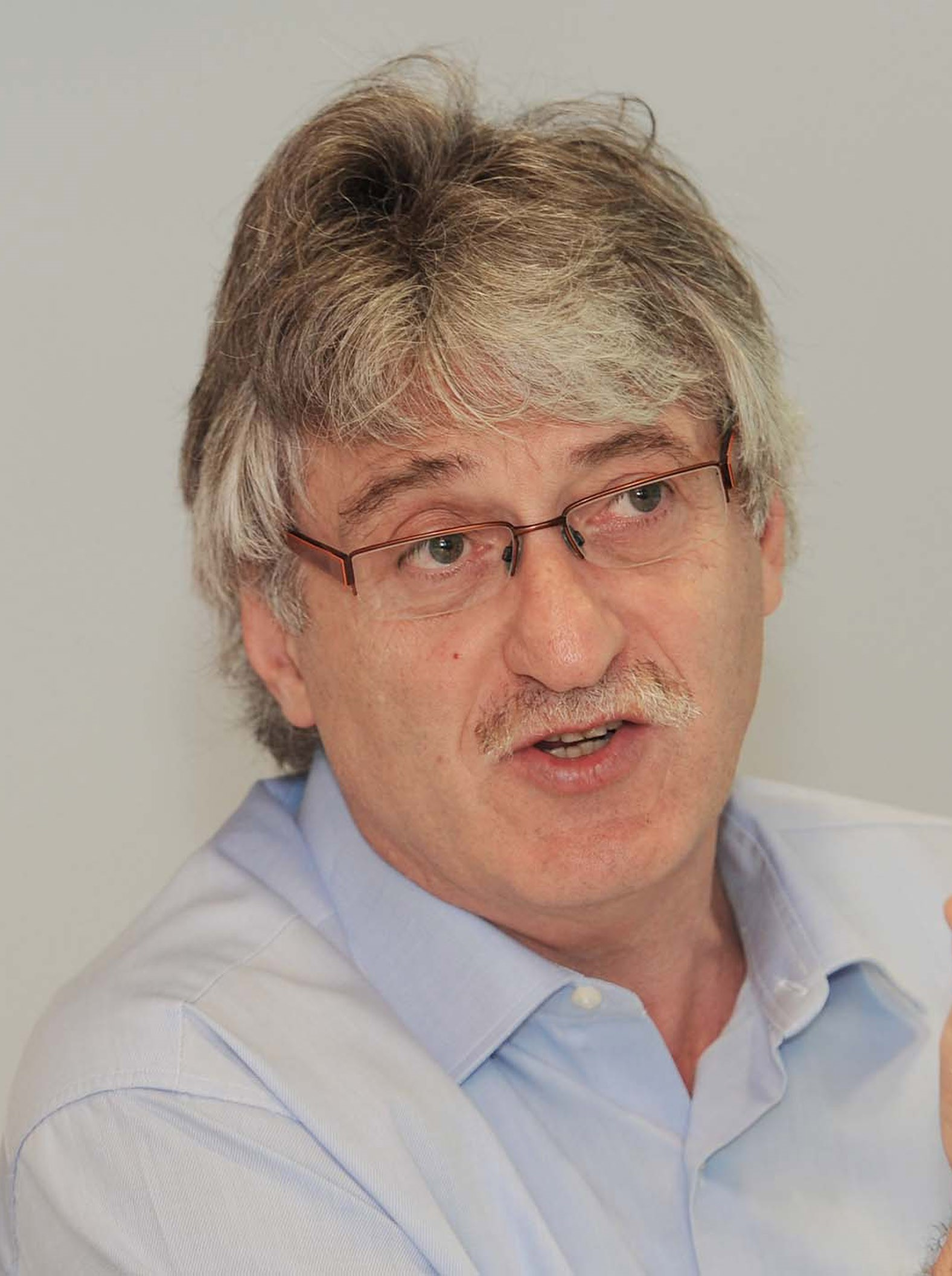

| | Majority party | Minority party | Third party |
|---|---|---|---|
| Leader | Debora Serracchiani | Renzo Tondo | Saverio Galluccio |
| Party | Democratic Party | People of Freedom | Five Star Movement |
| Alliance | Centre-left | Centre-right |
| Seats won | 27 | 17 | 5 |
| Seat change | ▲4 | ▼17 | new |
| Popular vote | 211,508 | 209,457 | 103,135 |
| Percentage | 39.39% | 39.00% | 19.21% |
| Swing | ▼6.77% | ▼14.84% | new |
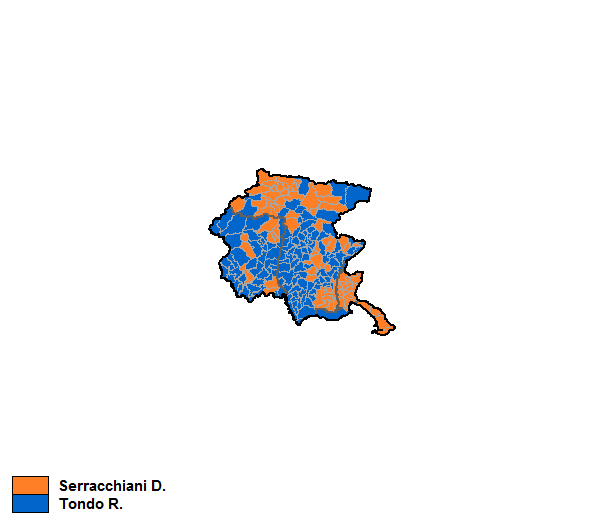
President before election
Renzo Tondo
People of Freedom
President-elect
Debora Serracchiani
Democratic Party

The 2013 Friuli-Venezia Giulia regional election took place on 21–22 April 2013 in the Friuli-Venezia Giulia region of Italy.

Debora Serracchiani, Socialist MEP and regional leader of the Democratic Party (PD), narrowly defeated incumbent Renzo Tondo of The People of Freedom (PdL) 39.4% to 39.0%; Saverio Galluccio of the Five Star Movement (M5S) came third with 19.2% of the vote. Serracchiani was the second woman to hold the office of President of Friuli-Venezia Giulia, after Alessandra Guerra of the Northern League (LN) in 1994–1995. The turnout was a record low as a mere 50.5% of eligible voters turned out to vote.

In the election, the PD was the most voted list with 26.8% (resulting in 20 seats, including Serracchiani's), but the combined result of the PdL and its sister-list Responsible Autonomy (comprising PdL members, centre-right independents and the Friulian Autonomist Movement) was 30.7% (resulting in a total of 13 seats including Tondo's). Other than LN (8.3%, 3 seats), two other regional parties, Citizens for the President (5.3%, 3 seats) and Slovene Union (1.4%, 1 seat, Slovene minority), gained seats in the Regional Council.

On the same day of the regional election, also provincial and municipal elections were held. LN's Pietro Fontanini was re-elected President of the province of Udine by beating PD's Andrea Lerussi 50.0% to 41.1%. In the occasion, the separatist Friulian Front made its debut in electoral politics with 5.7% of the vote. In Udine no candidate for mayor passed the required 50%; a run-off will be held on 5–6 May.

== Results ==
21–22 April 2013 Friuli-Venezia Giulia regional election results
| Candidates | Votes | % | Seats | Parties | Votes | % | Seats |
|---|---|---|---|---|---|---|---|
| Debora Serracchiani | 211,508 | 39.39 | 1 | | | | |
| Debora Serracchiani | 211,508 | 39.39 | 1 | Democratic Party | 107,155 | 26.84 | 19 |
| Debora Serracchiani | 211,508 | 39.39 | 1 | Citizens for the President | 21,169 | 5.30 | 3 |
| Debora Serracchiani | 211,508 | 39.39 | 1 | Left Ecology Freedom | 17,764 | 4.45 | 3 |
| Debora Serracchiani | 211,508 | 39.39 | 1 | Slovene Union | 5,651 | 1.46 | 1 |
| Debora Serracchiani | 211,508 | 39.39 | 1 | Italy of Values | 4,006 | 1.00 | – |
| Debora Serracchiani | 211,508 | 39.39 | 1 | Total | 155,547 | 38.95 | 27 |
| Renzo Tondo | 209,457 | 39.00 | 1 | | | | |
| Renzo Tondo | 209,457 | 39.00 | 1 | The People of Freedom | 80,052 | 20.05 | 8 |
| Renzo Tondo | 209,457 | 39.00 | 1 | Responsible Autonomy – Tondo List (incl. MAF) | 42,847 | 10.73 | 4 |
| Renzo Tondo | 209,457 | 39.00 | 1 | Northern League Friuli-Venezia Giulia | 33,050 | 8.28 | 3 |
| Renzo Tondo | 209,457 | 39.00 | 1 | Union of the Centre | 14,758 | 3.70 | 1 |
| Renzo Tondo | 209,457 | 39.00 | 1 | The Right | 6,209 | 1.55 | – |
| Renzo Tondo | 209,457 | 39.00 | 1 | Pensioners' Party | 3,741 | 0.93 | – |
| Renzo Tondo | 209,457 | 39.00 | 1 | Total | 180,626 | 45.24 | 17 |
| Saverio Galluccio | 103,135 | 19.21 | – | Five Star Movement | 54,952 | 13.75 | 5 |
| Franco Bandelli | 12,909 | 2.40 | – | A Different Region | 8,231 | 2.06 | – |
| Total candidates | 536,992 | 100.00 | 2 | Total parties | 399,585 | 100.00 | 47 |
Source: Region of Friuli-Venezia Giulia – Elections
