= Sergio Cecotti =

Italian politician and physicist

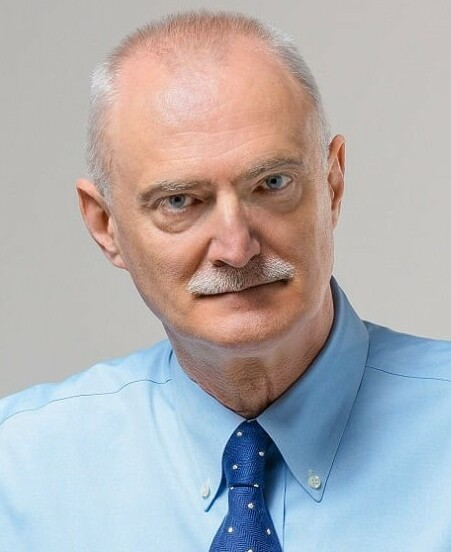

Mayor of Udine
- In office 2 December 1998 – 27 April 2008
- Preceded by: Enzo Barazza
- Succeeded by: Furio Honsell

President of Friuli-Venezia Giulia
- In office 5 September 1995 – 28 April 1996
- Preceded by: Alessandra Guerra
- Succeeded by: Giancarlo Cruder

Personal details
- Born: 23 October 1956 (age 69) Udine, Italy
- Party: LN (till 2003); Independent (2003-2018); PpA (since 2018)
- Education: University of Pisa
- Occupation: Physicist, politician, academic

Sergio Cecotti (born 23 October 1956) is an Italian politician, former mayor of Udine and former President of Friuli-Venezia Giulia.

== Biography ==
=== Academic career ===
Cecotti graduated in physics at the University of Pisa in 1979 and has worked at the Harvard University, at the UCLA, at the CERN in Geneva and at the ICTP in Trieste.

He has taught physics at the University of Pisa and at the International School for Advanced Studies of Trieste.

=== Political career ===
In 1993, Cecotti joined the Northern League, with which he has been elected to the regional council of Friuli-Venezia Giulia. He has been President of Friuli-Venezia Giulia for a few months between 1995 and 1996, with the support of his party and of the Olive Tree.

In December 1998, Cecotti is elected Mayor of Udine with the Northern League, leaving the party in 2003 after criticizing its subalternity to Forza Italia, and founding Convergence for Udine. After leaving the League, in June 2003 Cecotti is re-elected for a second mayoral term: this time, Cecotti was supported by the centre-left Olive Tree coalition. Cecotti held his seat for 10 years overall. On 14 February 2007 Cecotti decided to transform Convergence for Udine into a regional party, called Convergence for Friuli (Convergenza per il Friuli). The party was represented in the Regional Council of Friuli-Venezia Giulia by Mario Puiatti, elected in 2003 for the Greens.

In 2018, Cecotti founded the political movement Pact for Autonomy, an autonomism political party in Friuli-Venezia Giulia, which aims to protect all linguistic minorities in the region, and with which he ran again for the office of President of Friuli-Venezia Giulia at the 2018 regional election, ranking fourth.
