= Hermagoras Society =

Slovenian publishing house

The Hermagoras Society (Slovene: Družba sv. Mohorja or Mohorjeva družba) is Slovenia's oldest publishing house and has branches in Klagenfurt, Austria; Celje, Slovenia; and Gorizia, Italy. Named after Catholic Saint Hermagoras of Aquileia it originated on July 27, 1851, at the behest of Bishop Anton Martin Slomšek for the purpose of instructing Slovenes in reading and writing. Authorities formally recognized the organization in 1853 and in 1871 association opened its new building and publishing house. By 1918 the society had over 90,000 members and had published more than 16.3 million books. Following the results of the 1920 Carinthian plebiscite the seat was transferred from Klagenfurt to Celje. In 1940 during World War II both the Klagenfurt and Celje locations were closed down by the Nazis, who confiscated the printing presses and destroyed books.

After World War II ended, the printing presses were returned, and the Hermagoras Society resumed operation in 1945 and the printing house reopened in 1954. Since then the Gorizia branch of the Hermagoras Society has published the monthly magazine Družina in Dom (Family and Home) and the encyclopedia Primorski Biografski Leksikon (Encyclopedia of Littoral Biography). The branch cooperates with the Klagenfurt location in publishing an annual almanac (Slov. Koledar). The Celje location, meanwhile, was nationalized after World War II and forced to publish exclusively socialist materials until 1970, when it was reorganized. While its membership has fluctuated from 60,000 members in 1970 to 25,000 in 1990, as of 1991 it remained one of the three largest publishers in Slovenia.

In 2001 the Hermagoras Society celebrated its 150th anniversary, and the first president of Slovenia, Milan Kučan, gave a speech commemorating the society's publication of 40 million books in Slovene since its founding.
