= 1968 Friuli-Venezia Giulia regional election =

The 1968 Friuli-Venezia Giulia regional election took place on 26 May 1968. The legislature was expanded to five years following the creation of the ordinary regions.

== Events ==
Christian Democracy was by far the largest party, largely ahead of the Italian Communist Party which came second. After the election Alfredo Berzanti, the incumbent Christian Democratic President, formed a government with the Italian Socialist Party and the Republicans (organic Centre-left).

== Results ==
Party	votes	votes (%)	seats
Christian Democracy	344,039	44.9	29
Italian Communist Party	153,923	20.1	12
Italian Socialist Party – Italian Democratic Socialist Party	76,694	10.0	6
Italian Social Movement	39,197	5.1	3
Friuli Movement	38,879	5.1	3
Italian Liberal Party	37,092	4.8	3
Italian Socialist Party of Proletarian Unity	35,677	4.7	3
Italian Republican Party	19,138	2.5	1
Slovene Union	10,841	1.4	1
Others	10,192	1.3	-
Total	765,672	100.0	60

Sources: Istituto Cattaneo and Cjargne Online
