= Alessandra Guerra =

Italian politician (born 1963)

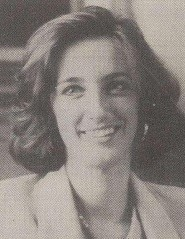

President of Friuli-Venezia Giulia
- In office 18 July 1994 – 7 November 1995
- Preceded by: Renzo Travanut
- Succeeded by: Sergio Cecotti

Member of the Regional Council of Friuli-Venezia Giulia
- In office 2 July 1993 – 15 April 2008

Personal details
- Born: 19 July 1963 (age 63) Udine, Italy
- Party: LN (1993–2008); PD (2009–2017); FdV (2017–2021); PTD (2024)
- Education: University of Udine
- Occupation: Teacher, politician

Alessandra Guerra (born 19 July 1963) is an Italian politician who was the president of Friuli-Venezia Giulia from 1994 to 1995. She was also a teacher in middle schools and collaborated with various art museums.

== Early life and education ==
Guerra was born in Udine, the daughter of one of the founders of the Friuli Movement. She graduated in literature with 110 cum laude.

== Career ==
In 1993, Guerra joined Umberto Bossi's Northern League (Lega Nord) and was elected regional councilor of Friuli-Venezia Giulia. In 1994, after a serious political crisis that had hit the region, she was appointed president of Friuli-Venezia Giulia, a position she held until 1995. In this period, she was also the president of the Conference of Regions and Autonomous Provinces. From 15 June 2001 to 23 June 2003, Guerra was the vice-president of the Friuli-Venezia Giulia Region and councilor for education and culture. After the 2003 Friuli-Venezia Giulia regional election, she was nominated for the presidency of the region by the House of Freedoms coalition.

Guerra lost the competition against former Trieste mayor Riccardo Illy, who was endorsed by The Olive Tree. In April 2008, Guerra left Lega Nord to join Illy's coalition, which was supported by the Democratic Party (PD) and other centre-left political forces. Later in July 2009, Guerra joined the PD. She supported the motion of Pier Luigi Bersani in the 2009 PD leadership election.

In autumn 2017, Guerra declared that she wanted to participate in the 2018 Friuli-Venezia Giulia regional election as a candidate for the presidency of the region for the Federation of the Greens as also confirmed by the spokesman for the Greens of the region; this announcement was not followed up.

In 2024, Guerra ran unsuccessfully for the European Parliament on the left-wing list Peace Land Dignity (PTD) in North-East Italy.
