= 2023 Friuli-Venezia Giulia regional election =

| ← 2018 | 2–3 April 2023 |

All 48 seats to the Regional Council 25 seats needed for a majority
- Turnout: 45.26% ▼4.39%
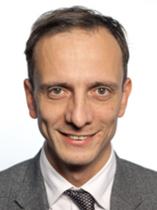

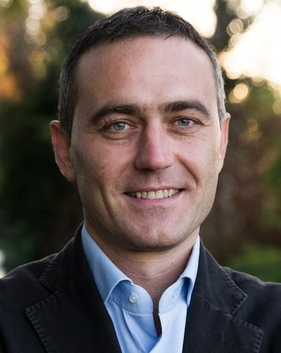
| | Majority party | Minority party |
|---|---|---|
| Candidate | Massimiliano Fedriga | Massimo Moretuzzo |
| Party | League | Pact for Autonomy |
| Alliance | Centre-right | Centre-left |
| Last election | 29 seats, 57.1% | 18 seats, 42.9% |
| Seats won | 29 | 19 |
| Seat change | 0 | ▲1 |
| Popular vote | 314,824 | 139,018 |
| Percentage | 64.2% | 28.4% |
| Swing | ▲7.1% | ▼14.5% |
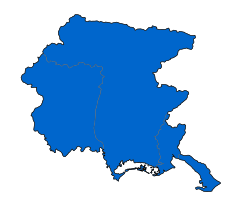
- Map of the results of the regional election. Colors identify the candidate who received a plurality in each province. Blue indicates a Fedriga majority.
Government before election
Massimiliano Fedriga
Centre-right
Elected Government
Massimiliano Fedriga
Centre-right

The 2023 Friuli-Venezia Giulia regional election took place from 2 to 3 April 2023. The election took place concurrently with the municipal election in 19 comuni of the Region.

== Electoral system ==
=== Number of councilors ===
The Special Statute provides that the number of the regional councilors is determinated by one every 25,000 inhabitants or fraction greater than 10,000, according to the data taken by the last official detection of Istat. In the 2018 election, 47 councilors were elected in the constituencies, while 1 was the seat for the president and 1 was the seat for the "best loser", the first losing candidate.

=== Majority bonus ===
Following the regional electoral law, the candidate that obtains the largest number of valid votes becomes president. The lists that are accepted in the distribution of seats are the ones that:

- obtained at least 4% of the regional votes
- obtained at least 1.5% of the regional votes and are in a coalition that obtained at least 15% of the votes
- obtained at least 20% of the votes in one of the constituencies

The winning coalition has to have at least 55% of the seats if the president is elected with less than 45% of votes, and if the votes of the winning candidate are more than 45%, his/her coalition has to have at least 60% of the seats.

=== Seat for the Slovenian minority ===
The lists that represent the Slovenian minority must have at least one seat if they obtained 1% or more votes.

=== Constituencies ===
The territory of the region is divided in five constituencies: Trieste, Gorizia, Udine, Tolmezzo and Pordenone.

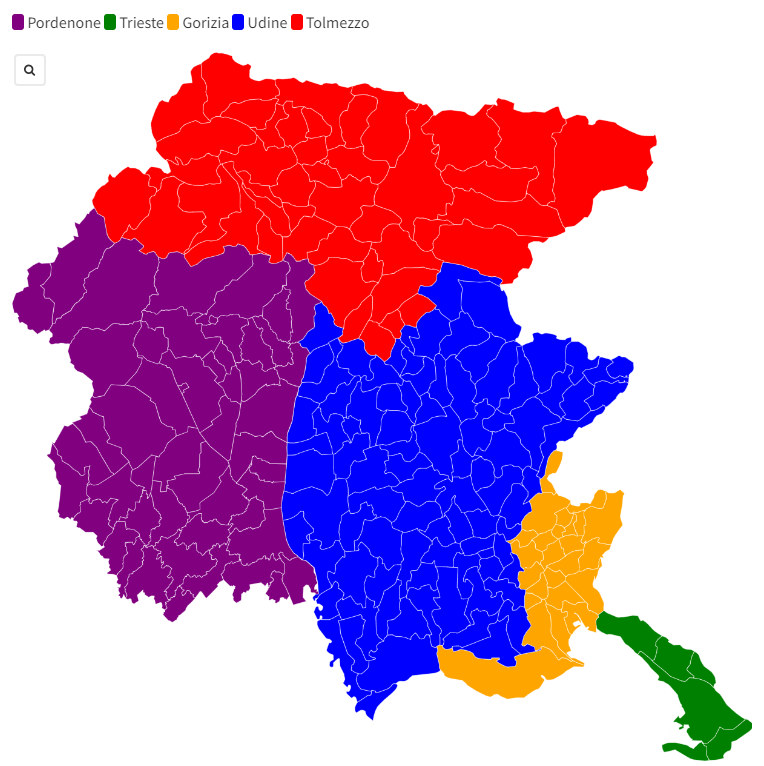
Map showing the constituencies by comune

Seats by constituency
| Constituency | Number of seats |
|---|---|
| Trieste | 9 |
| Gorizia | 5 |
| Udine | 18 |
| Tolmezzo | 3 |
| Pordenone | 12 |

=== How to vote ===
There are 4 different ways to vote:

- Choosing only a candidate for president, drawing a sign on the name of the candidate
- Choosing a candidate and a list, drawing a sign on the name of the candidate and on the list symbol. The split vote is allowed.
- Choosing a candidate, a list and expressing a preference for a list candidate.
- Choosing only a list; in this case the vote automatically counts as a vote for the candidate for president of the chosen list.

== Parties and candidates ==
| Political party or alliance | Constituent lists | Previous results | | Candidate |
| Political party or alliance | Constituent lists | Votes (%) | Seats | Candidate |
|---|---|---|---|---|
| Centre-right coalition | Lega Friuli-Venezia Giulia | 34.91 | 17 | Massimiliano Fedriga |
| Centre-right coalition | Forza Italia | 12.06 | 5 | Massimiliano Fedriga |
| Centre-right coalition | Fedriga for President (incl. PFVG, UDC) | 6.29 | 3 | Massimiliano Fedriga |
| Centre-right coalition | Brothers of Italy | 5.49 | 2 | Massimiliano Fedriga |
| Centre-right coalition | Responsible Autonomy (incl. Trieste Libera) | 3.97 | 1 | Massimiliano Fedriga |
| Centre-left coalition | Democratic Party | 18.11 | 10 | Massimo Moretuzzo |
| Centre-left coalition | Five Star Movement | 7.06 | 4 | Massimo Moretuzzo |
| Centre-left coalition | Pact for Autonomy | 4.09 | 2 | Massimo Moretuzzo |
| Centre-left coalition | Open – Left FVG | 2.78 | 1 | Massimo Moretuzzo |
| Centre-left coalition | Slovene Union | 1.16 | 1 | Massimo Moretuzzo |
| Centre-left coalition | Greens and Left Alliance | — | — | Massimo Moretuzzo |
| Action – Italia Viva – More Europe | | — | — | Alessandro Maran |
| Together Free (Incl. Italexit, M3V and PdF) | | — | — | Giorgia Tripoli |

== Results ==
| Candidates | Votes | % | Seats | Parties | Votes | % | Seats |
|---|---|---|---|---|---|---|---|
| Massimiliano Fedriga | 314,824 | 64.24 | 1 | Lega Friuli-Venezia Giulia | 75,117 | 19.02 | 9 |
| Massimiliano Fedriga | 314,824 | 64.24 | 1 | Brothers of Italy | 71,503 | 18.10 | 8 |
| Massimiliano Fedriga | 314,824 | 64.24 | 1 | Fedriga for President | 70,192 | 17.77 | 8 |
| Massimiliano Fedriga | 314,824 | 64.24 | 1 | Forza Italia | 26,329 | 6.67 | 3 |
| Massimiliano Fedriga | 314,824 | 64.24 | 1 | Responsible Autonomy | 7,762 | 1.97 | – |
| Massimiliano Fedriga | 314,824 | 64.24 | 1 | Total | 250,903 | 63.53 | 28 |
| Massimo Moretuzzo | 139,018 | 28.37 | 1 | Democratic Party | 65,143 | 16.49 | 10 |
| Massimo Moretuzzo | 139,018 | 28.37 | 1 | Pact for Autonomy | 24,838 | 6.29 | 4 |
| Massimo Moretuzzo | 139,018 | 28.37 | 1 | Five Star Movement | 9,486 | 2.40 | 1 |
| Massimo Moretuzzo | 139,018 | 28.37 | 1 | Greens and Left Alliance | 8,029 | 2.03 | 1 |
| Massimo Moretuzzo | 139,018 | 28.37 | 1 | Open – Left FVG | 5,957 | 1.51 | 1 |
| Massimo Moretuzzo | 139,018 | 28.37 | 1 | Slovene Union | 4,016 | 1.02 | 1 |
| Massimo Moretuzzo | 139,018 | 28.37 | 1 | Total | 117,469 | 29.74 | 18 |
| Giorgia Tripoli | 22,840 | 4.66 | – | Together Free | 15,712 | 3.98 | – |
| Alessandro Maran | 13,374 | 2.73 | – | Action – Italia Viva – More Europe | 10,869 | 2.75 | – |
| Blank and invalid votes | 12,019 | 2.39 | | | | | |
| Total candidates | 490,056 | 100.00 | 2 | Total parties | 394,957 | 100.00 | 46 |
| Registered voters/turnout | 1,109,395 | 45.26 | | | | | |
Source: Friuli-Venezia Giulia Region
