= Responsible Autonomy =

Italian political party

Responsible Autonomy Autonomia Responsabile
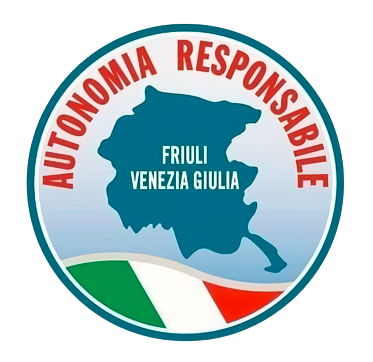
- Leader: Renzo Tondo
- Founded: 2013
- Dissolved: 2023
- Ideology: Regionalism; Liberal conservatism
- Political position: Centre to centre-right

Website
- www.autonomiaresponsabilefvg.it

Responsible Autonomy (Italian: Autonomia Responsabile, AR) was a centrist to centre-right political party active in Friuli-Venezia Giulia, Italy.

The party was launched as a "civic list" in support of Renzo Tondo, incumbent President of The People of Freedom in the 2013 regional election. In the event, Tondo was defeated by Debora Serracchiani of the Democratic Party, but AR obtained 10.7% of the vote and four councillors. Others joined later on.

During 2014 AR was organised into a party, under the leadership of president Bruno Tellia, a university professor, and secretary Vanni Lenna, a former member of the Chamber of Deputies. Also, the party was officially joined by Tondo, who became floor leader, replacing Roberto Dipiazza. In 2016 Dipiazza was elected mayor of Trieste and the entire party's leadership was reshuffled: Tellia was replaced as president by Tondo, while Lenna was succeeded as secretary by Giulia Manzan.

In early 2017 AR was involved in the foundation of Direction Italy by the Conservatives and Reformists, but has since continued to be active autonomously. In the 2017 local elections the party obtained 6.0% in Gorizia.

In the 2018 general election Tondo was elected to the Chamber of Deputies, by defeating his old-time Democratic rival Riccardo Illy in the single-seat constituency of Trieste. In the subsequent 2018 regional elections the party obtained 4.0% and lost three of its four seats in the Regional Council.

In the 2023 regional elections, the party once again backed the outgoing president, Massimiliano Fedriga; the list, which also included candidates from the Free Trieste Movement, secured 1.97% of the vote but failed to win any seats. Following the movement’s merger with Us Moderates, in November 2023 Renzo Tondo took up the post of regional coordinator of the new political party.

== Election results ==
=== Regional elections ===
Election	Votes	%	Seats	+/–
2013	42,847	10.73	4 / 49	New
2018	16,802	3.97	1 / 49	▼3
2023	7,762	1.97	0 / 48	▼1

== Leadership ==
- President: Bruno Tellia (2014–2016), Renzo Tondo (2016–2023)
- Secretary: Vanni Lenna (2014–2016), Giulia Manzan (2016–2023)
- Leader/representative in the Regional Council: Roberto Dipiazza (2013–2014), Renzo Tondo (2014–2018), Giuseppe Sibau (2018–2023)
- Representative in the Chamber of Deputies: Renzo Tondo (2018–2022)
