= 1998 Friuli-Venezia Giulia regional election =

The 1998 Friuli-Venezia Giulia regional election took place on 14 June 1998.

Forza Italia, at its first appearance in a regional election, became the largest party with 20.6%, while Northern League came second with 17.3%, but the combined score of all regionalist parties was 26.3%.

After the election a government led by Roberto Antonione (Forza Italia) and composed of Forza Italia, Northern League, National Alliance, Christian Democratic Centre and Friuli Union was formed.

== Results ==
Party	votes	votes (%)	seats
Forza Italia – Christian Democratic Centre	136,013	20.6	14
Northern League Friuli-Venezia Giulia	114,156	17.3	12
Democrats of the Left	100,783	15.3	10
National Alliance	363,918	13.3	9
Reformist Popular Centre (PPI – UDR – RI – PRI – SSk)	72,387	11.0	7
Communist Refoundation Party	44,485	6.7	4
Federation of the Greens	32,392	4.9	3
Friuli Union	24,030	3.6	1
Autonomy Project	18,915	2.8	-
Lega Autonomia Friuli	10.677	1.6	-
Julian Front	6,719	1.0	-
S.O.S. Italy	5,213	0.8	-
Tricolour Flame	3,986	0.6	-
Total	659,947	100.0	60

Source: Friuli-Venezia Giulia Region
