= Debora Serracchiani =

Italian politician (born 1970)

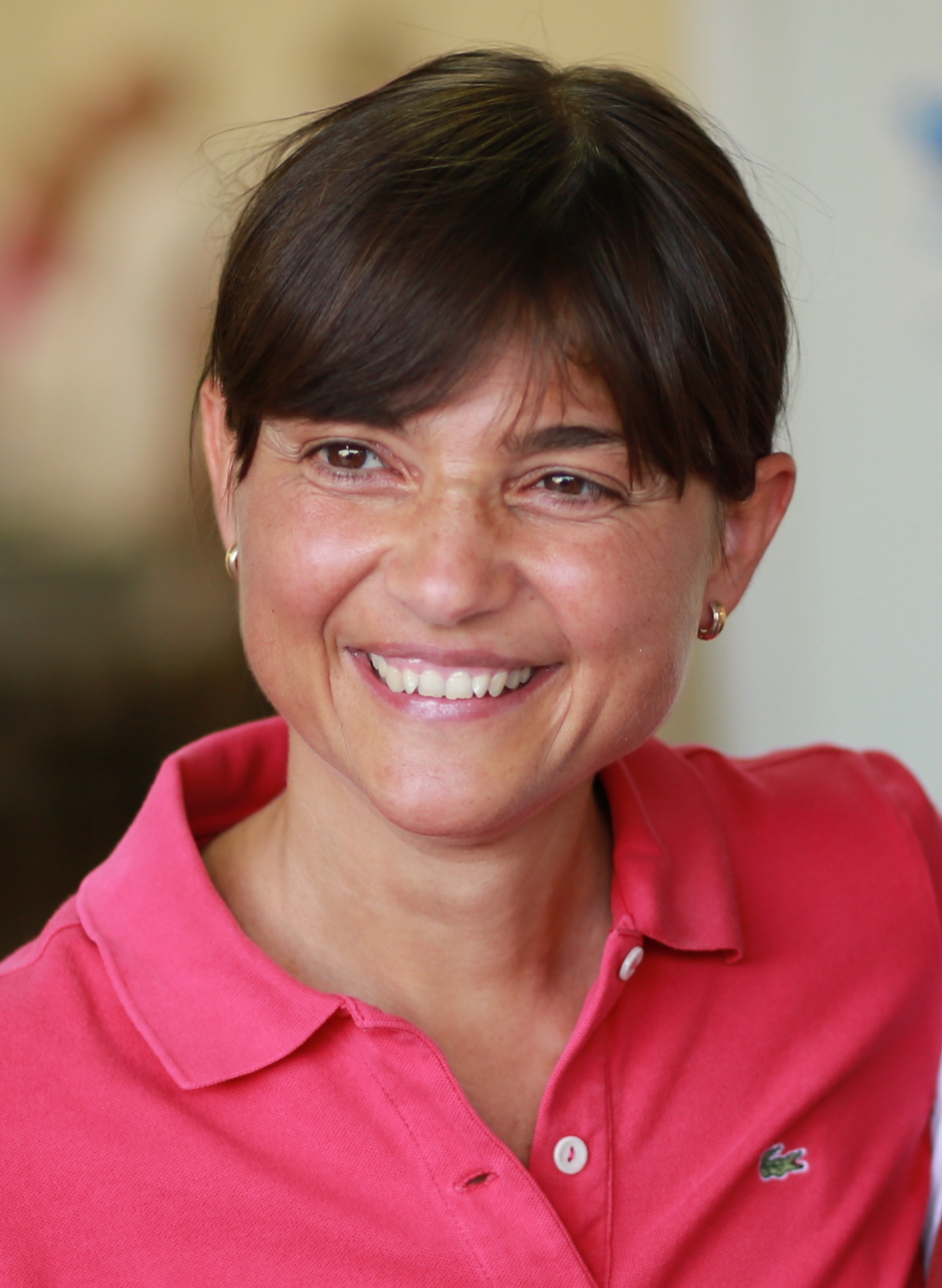

Vice President of the Democratic Party
- In office 17 March 2019 – 12 March 2023 Serving with Anna Ascani
- President: Paolo Gentiloni (2019–2020); Valentina Cuppi (2020–present)
- Preceded by: Barbara Pollastrini; Domenico De Santis
- Succeeded by: Loredana Capone; Chiara Gribaudo

Member of the Chamber of Deputies
- Incumbent
- Assumed office 23 March 2018
- Constituency: Friuli-Venezia Giulia

President of Friuli-Venezia Giulia
- In office 25 April 2013 – 3 May 2018
- Preceded by: Renzo Tondo
- Succeeded by: Massimiliano Fedriga

Deputy Secretary of the Democratic Party
- In office 28 March 2014 – 7 May 2017 Serving with Lorenzo Guerini
- Leader: Matteo Renzi
- Preceded by: Enrico Letta
- Succeeded by: Maurizio Martina

Personal details
- Born: 10 November 1970 (age 55) Rome, Italy
- Party: Democratic Party
- Education: Sapienza University of Rome
- Profession: Politician, lawyer

Debora Serracchiani (born 10 November 1970) is an Italian politician. Born in Rome, she is a member of Democratic Party, and was president of the Italian region of Friuli-Venezia Giulia. In 2016, she proposed and got the approval of a regional law which officially abolished provinces of the Friuli-Venezia Giulia, moving their competences to the lower and the upper administrative level, which were respectively the Italian comune and the region. Friuli-Venezia Giulia was the first region to implement the 2014 Delrio national law.

Serracchiani served as a Member of the European Parliament (MEP) of the European Parliament from 2008-13 as a member of the PD. She was also a member of the Progressive Alliance of Socialists and Democrats, an alliance within the European Parliament. As a MEP and regional leader of the Democratic Party (PD), she narrowly defeated incumbent President Renzo Tondo of The People of Freedom (PdL) 39.4% to 39.0% in the Friuli-Venezia Giulia regional election held on 21–22 April 2013, and she took office on 22 April 2013. Serracchiani is the second woman to hold the office of President of Friuli-Venezia Giulia, since Alessandra Guerra of Lega Nord Friuli (LNF) from 1994–95.

Serracchiani is Director of Institutional Relations of the Italy-USA Foundation.
