= Renzo Tondo =

Italian politician, former President of Friuli-Venezia Giulia

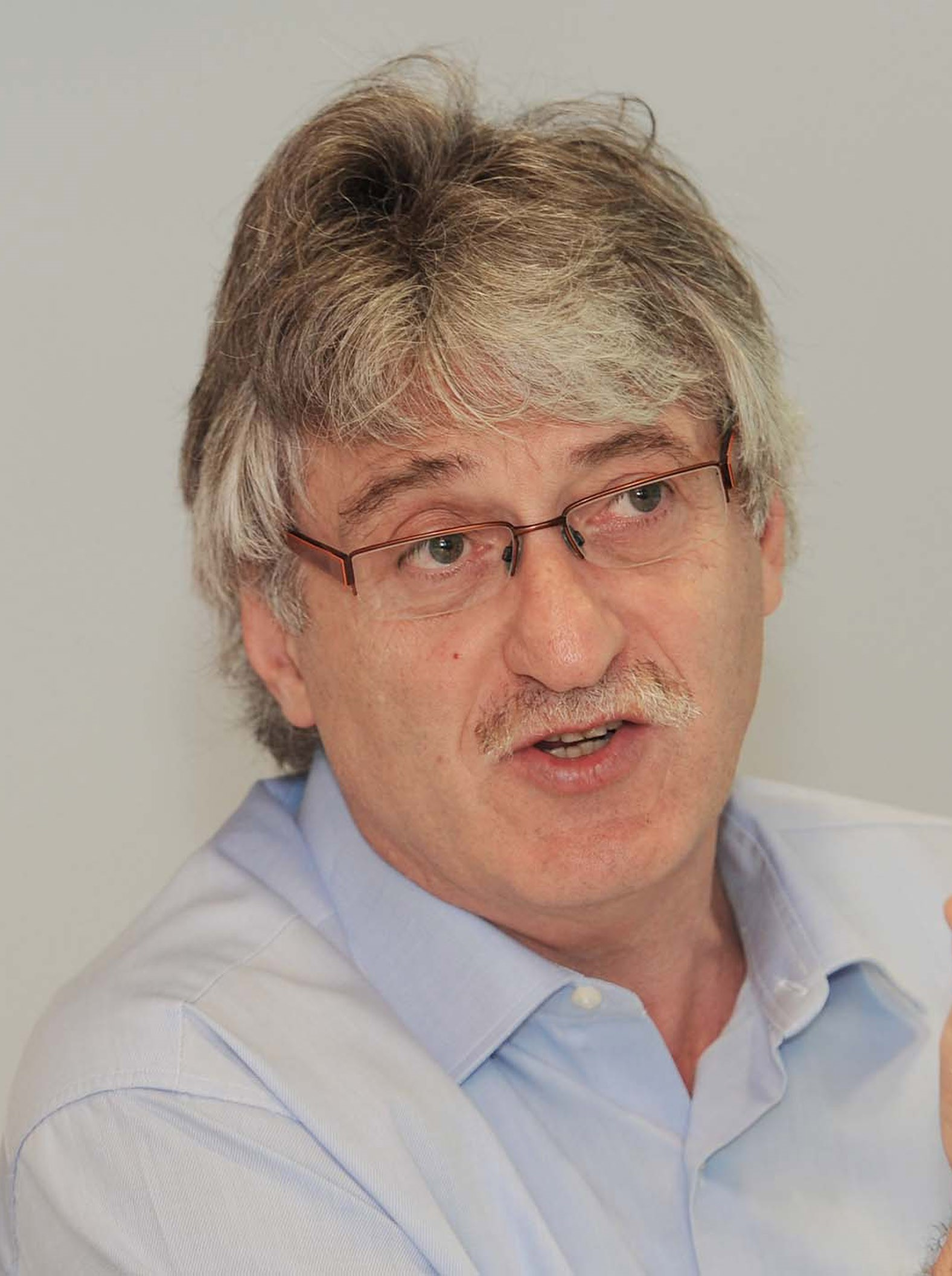

Member of the Chamber of Deputies
- In office 23 March 2018 – 13 October 2022
- Constituency: Friuli-Venezia Giulia (Trieste)
- In office 28 April 2006 – 28 April 2008

President of Friuli-Venezia Giulia
- In office 15 June 2001 – 14 June 2003
- Preceded by: Roberto Antonione
- Succeeded by: Riccardo Illy
- In office 18 April 2008 – 25 April 2013
- Preceded by: Riccardo Illy
- Succeeded by: Debora Serracchiani

Personal details
- Born: 7 August 1956 (age 70) Tolmezzo, Italy
- Party: PSI (1979–1994); FI (1994-2009); PdL (2009-2013); FI (2013-2015); AR (2015-2017); NcI (since 2017)
- Education: University of Trieste
- Occupation: Entrepreneur, politician

Renzo Tondo (born 7 August 1956) is an Italian politician, former President of Friuli-Venezia Giulia.

== Early life ==
He graduated in Political Sciences at the University of Trieste. He began his career as a hotel keeper.

== Career ==
=== First political experiences ===
Tondo moved into politics with the Italian Socialist Party, with whom he was elected mayor of his hometown Tolmezzo from 1990 to 1995.

=== First gubernatorial term ===
In 1998, Tondo became Regional Councilor with Forza Italia. In 2001 he was appointed President of the Regional Council of Friuli-Venezia Giulia. In 2006, Tondo was elected to the Chamber of Deputies.

=== Second gubernatorial term ===
In 2008, Tondo was re-elected President of Friuli-Venezia Giulia, supported by the centre-right coalition, defeating the incumbent governor Riccardo Illy, who was supported by the Democratic Party. Five years later, in 2013, Tondo was defeated by centre-left candidate Debora Serracchiani.

=== Responsible Autonomy ===
In 2015 founded Responsible Autonomy, which later became part of Us with Italy. In 2018, Tondo was re-elected to the Chamber of Deputies as centre-right candidate in a single-seat constituency.

On 16 March 2018, Tondo was initially chosen by the centre-right coalition as candidate for president of FVG, but five days later Massimiliano Fedriga from the Northern League became the official candidate, and was later elected president.
