= Regional Council of Friuli-Venezia Giulia =

Legislative organ of Friuli Venezia Giulia, Italy

Regional Council of Friuli-Venezia Giulia: Consiglio regionale del Friuli Venezia Giulia; Consei Regjonâl di Friûl Vignesie Julie; Deželni svet Furlanije Julijske krajine; Regionalrat der Region Friaul Julisch Venetien
- 13th Legislature
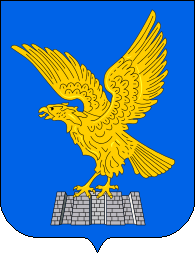

Type
- Type: Regional council Unicameral

Leadership
- President: Mauro Bordin, Lega

Structure
- Seats: 48
- Political groups: Government (29): Lega (9); FdI (8); FP (8); FI (3); FN (1); Opposition (19): PD (11); PPA (5); Mixed (3)

Elections
- Last election: April 2–3, 2023
- Next election: 2028

Meeting place
- Piazza Oberdan 6, Trieste

Website
- consiglio.regione.fvg.it

The Regional Council of Friuli-Venezia Giulia (Italian: Consiglio regionale del Friuli Venezia Giulia; Friulian: Consei Regjonâl di Friûl Vignesie Julie; Slovene: Deželni svet Furlanije Julijske krajine; German: Regionalrat der Region Friaul Julisch Venetien) is the legislative assembly of the autonomous region of Friuli-Venezia Giulia.

The assembly was elected for the first time in 1964. Its first location was in Piazza Unità d'Italia; then, in 1972, the seat of the council was moved to Piazza Oberdan.

== Composition ==
Following the amendment of the Statute approved in January 2013 by the Parliament, the assembly is made up of a variable number of councillors, one of every 25,000 inhabitants according to the data of the last census; from the foundation to the 10th regional legislature it was elected a councillor for every 20,000 people. This change led to the election of 49 councillors, including the president, in the 2013 elections, while previously the council was composed of 59 members.

=== Political groups ===
The Regional Council of Friuli-Venezia Giulia is currently composed of the following political groups:

Party	Seats	Status
Democratic Party	11 / 48	In opposition
League FVG	9 / 48	In government
Brothers of Italy	8 / 48	In government
Fedriga for President	8 / 48	In government
Pact for Autonomy – Civica FVG	5 / 48	In opposition
Forza Italia	3 / 48	In government
Mixed Group	3 / 48	In opposition
Mixed Group	1 / 48	External support

== Presidents ==
- Teodoro de Rinaldini (1964-1968)
- Michelangelo Ribezzi (1968-1973)
- Alfredo Berzanti (1973-1974)
- Arnaldo Pittoni (1974-1978)
- Mario Colli (1978-1983)
- Vinicio Turello (1983-1984)
- Luigi Manzon (1984-?)
- Paolo Solimbergo (?-1988)
- Bruno Longo (?-?)
- Paolo Solimbergo (?-?)
- Nemo Gonano (?-1993)
- Pietro Fontanini (1993)
- Cristiano Degano (1993-1994)
- Giancarlo Cruder (1994-1996)
- Roberto Antonione (1996-1998)
- Antonio Martini (1998-2003)
- Alessandro Tesini (2003-2008)
- Edouard Ballaman (2008-2010)
- Maurizio Franz (2010-2013)
- Franco Iacop (2013-2018)
- Ettore Romoli (2018)
- Piero Mauro Zanin (2018-2023)
- Mauro Bordin (2023-present)

== See also ==
- Regional council
- Politics of Friuli-Venezia Giulia
