= Pietro Fontanini =

Italian politician (born 1952)

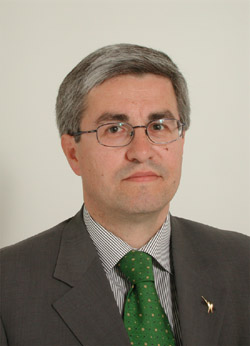

Mayor of Udine
- In office 14 May 2018 – 18 April 2023
- Preceded by: Furio Honsell
- Succeeded by: Alberto Felice De Toni

President of the Province of Udine
- In office 15 April 2008 – 22 aprile 2018
- Preceded by: Marzio Strassoldo
- Succeeded by: Office abolished

President of Friuli-Venezia Giulia
- In office 3 August 1993 – 11 January 1994
- Preceded by: Vinicio Turello
- Succeeded by: Renzo Travanut

Member of the Chamber of Deputies
- In office 9 May 1996 – 27 April 2006

Member of the Senate
- In office 15 April 1994 – 9 May 1996

Personal details
- Born: 23 September 1952 (age 74) Udine, Italy
- Party: Lega Nord
- Education: University of Trieste
- Occupation: Teacher, politician

Pietro Fontanini (born 23 September 1952) is an Italian politician from the Lega Nord, former mayor of Udine and former President of Friuli-Venezia Giulia.

== Biography ==
Graduated in Sociology, Fontanini joined the Lega Nord after having spent a few years in the Italian Communist Party in Friuli. Once elected to the regional council of Friuli-Venezia Giulia, Fontanini is appointed President of Friuli-Venezia Giulia for the first five months of the legislature.

He left his seat in the regional council in order to run for the Senate at the 1994 general election, resulting in his election. He is later elected to the Chamber of Deputies at the 1996 and the 2001 general election.

In 1995, Fontanini is elected Mayor of Campoformido, in the province of Udine, and held the seat for two consecutive terms until 2004.

In 2008, he is elected President of the province of Udine, being later re-elected in 2013. He left the office a few months before the end of his second term in order to run for the office of Mayor of Udine at the 2018 local election: Fontanini is elected at the runoff.
