= Massimiliano Fedriga =

Italian Northern League politician

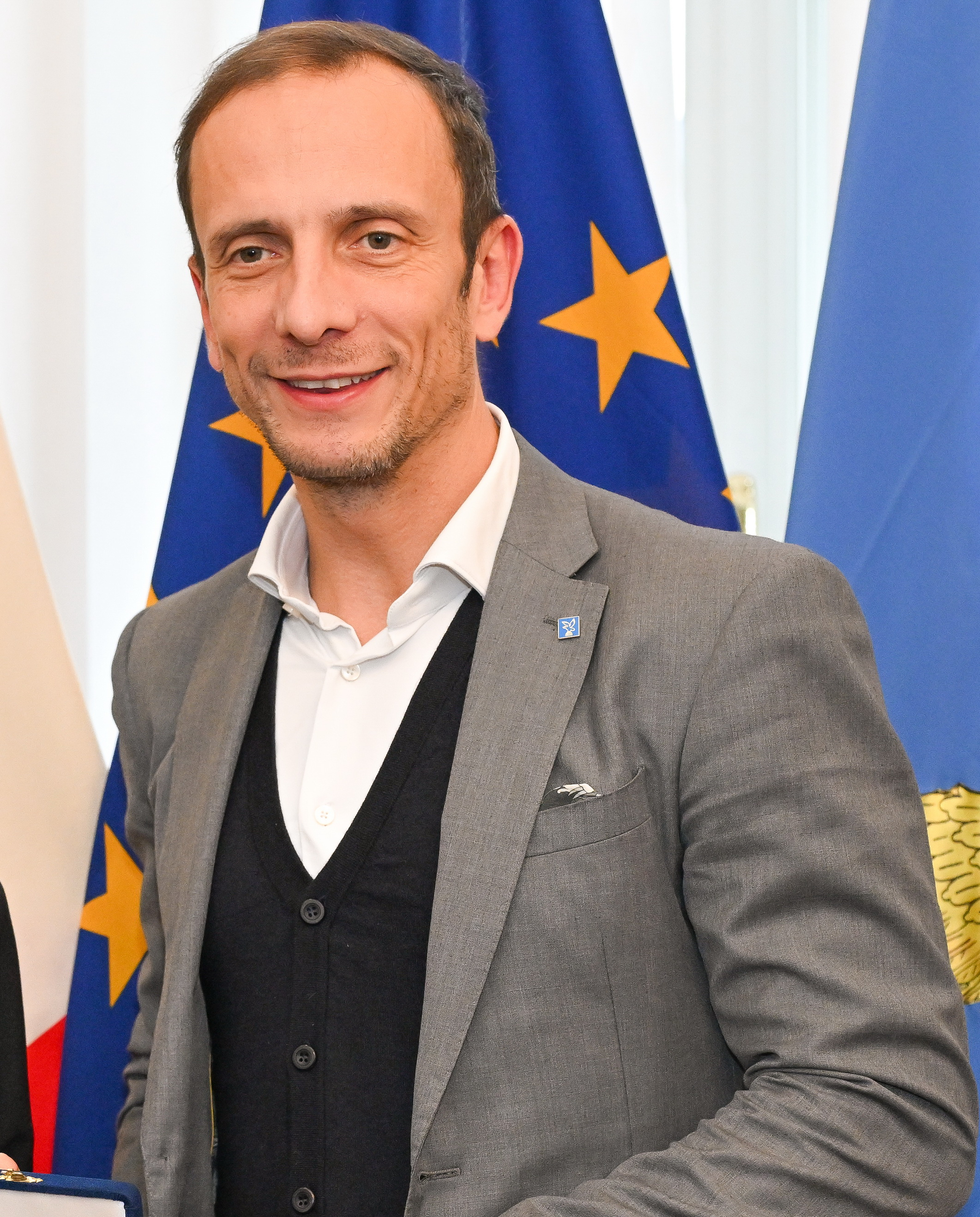
- Fedriga in 2024

President of Friuli-Venezia Giulia
- Incumbent
- Assumed office 3 May 2018
- Preceded by: Debora Serracchiani

President of the Conference of Regions and Autonomous Provinces
- Incumbent
- Assumed office 9 April 2021
- Vice President: Michele Emiliano
- Preceded by: Stefano Bonaccini

Member of the Chamber of Deputies
- In office 29 April 2008 – 8 May 2018
- Constituency: Friuli-Venezia Giulia

Personal details
- Born: 2 July 1980 (age 46) Verona, Italy
- Party: Lega Nord
- Spouse: Elena Sartori (m. 2013)
- Children: 2
- Education: University of Trieste
- Profession: Politician, marketing consultant

Massimiliano Fedriga (born 2 July 1980) is an Italian Northern League politician. He is the president of the Friuli-Venezia Giulia autonomous region.

== Biography ==
Born in Verona on 2 July 1980 and raised in Trieste, Fedriga graduated in Communication Sciences at the University of Trieste. After graduating, he obtained a master's degree in communication management and analysis.

He joined the Northern League in 1995. Subsequently, he became a member of the "National Council", the decision-making body of the party in Friuli-Venezia Giulia and then of the Federal Council. Since 2003 he has been provincial secretary of the League, while on 28 September 2014 he was elected national secretary of the party of Friuli-Venezia Giulia.

He was elected MP for the first time in 2008; he was then re-elected in 2013 and 2018.

In 2011 Fedriga was candidate for mayor of Trieste, but obtained only 6.3% of the votes.

In 2018 Fedriga was elected President of Friuli-Venezia Giulia with 57.1% of preferences.

He is Knight of Honor of the Order of St. George.

In 2023 Fedriga won re-election with 64.2% of preferences.
