= Riccardo Illy =

Italian businessman and former politician (born 1955)

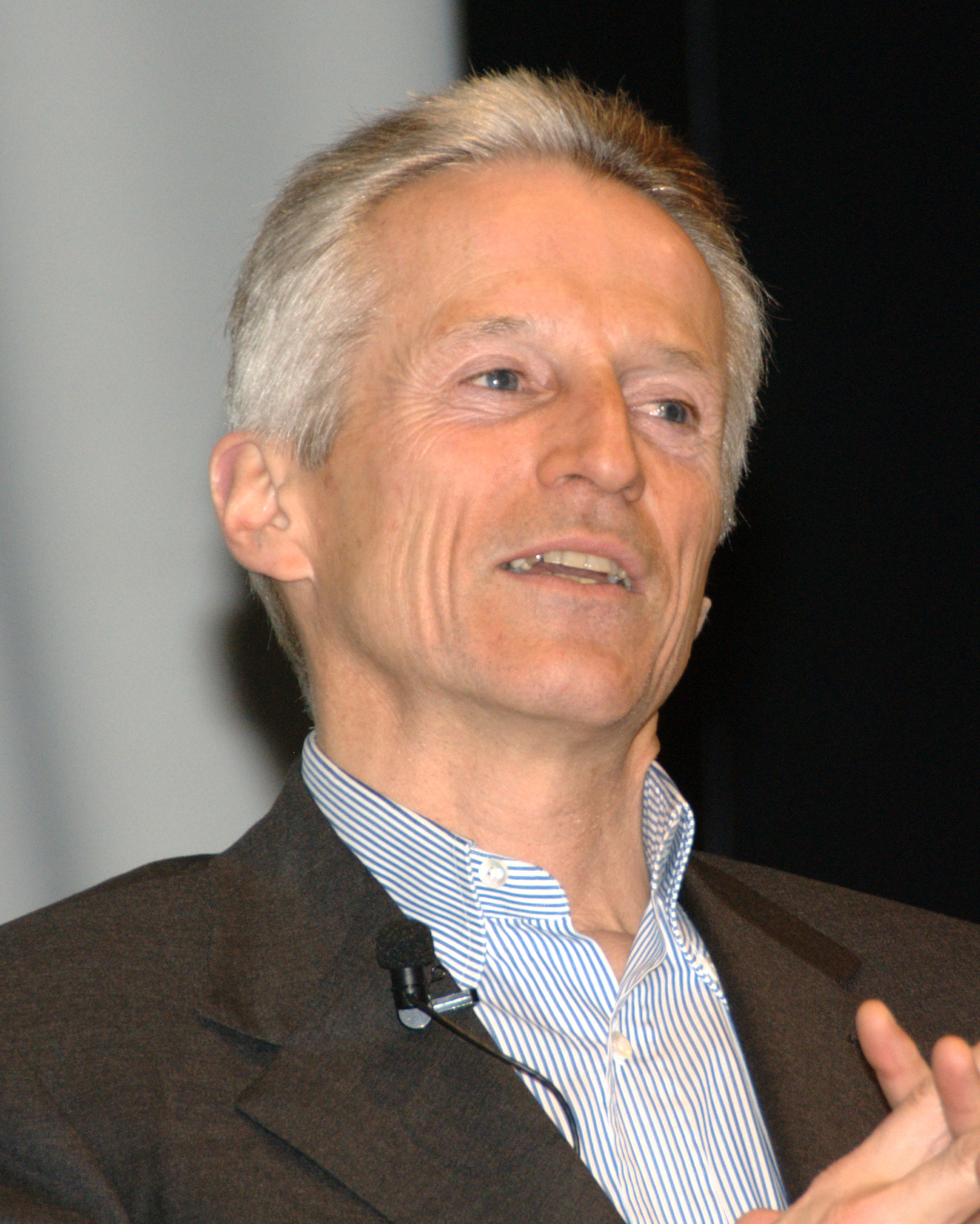

President of Friuli-Venezia Giulia
- In office 14 June 2003 – 18 April 2008
- Preceded by: Renzo Tondo
- Succeeded by: Renzo Tondo

Mayor of Trieste
- In office 5 December 1993 – 24 June 2001
- Preceded by: Giulio Staffieri
- Succeeded by: Roberto Dipiazza

Personal details
- Born: 24 September 1955 (age 70) Trieste, Italy
- Party: Democratic Party
- Spouse: Rossana Bettini
- Parent(s): Ernesto Illy; Anna Rossi
- Relatives: Francesco Illy (grandfather); Anna (sister); Francesco (brother); Andrea (brother)
- Profession: Businessman

Riccardo Illy (born 24 September 1955) is an Italian businessman and former politician.

== Biography ==
Riccardo Illy was born in Trieste, Friuli-Venezia Giulia. His paternal grandfather, Francesco Illy, was of Hungarian origin. He's Waldensian.

As a young man Illy worked as a skiing instructor at Piancavallo and a sailing instructor at Monfalcone. He married Rossana Bettini, food and wine journalist, at a young age. They have a daughter Daria who is now a Physical Education teacher and personal trainer.

Illy started work in the family's coffee making firm illycaffè in 1977, which was founded by his grandfather in 1933. As the company's Business Director, reorganised its internal business structure as well as the structures of the other firms it controlled. He created a marketing department for the company which, up to then, did not have one. He subsequently served as CEO and is presently the vice president of the company, which has a presence in over 140 countries. Illy is the author of a book entitled Dal Caffe all'Espresso (From Coffeebeans to Espresso) published by Mondadori and translated into English, French and German.

Illy has held positions of Vice President of the Association of Industrialists in Trieste and President of the Seminario Permanente Veronelli.

Standing as an independent supported by a coalition which preceded Ulivo (the Olive Branch Party) and also by a civic list bearing his name, Illy has been elected twice — in 1993 and again in 1997 — as Mayor of Trieste. As First Citizen and a sincere music lover, he has taken up the position of President of Trieste's Theatre Giuseppe Verdi. Until 2002 he was Chairman of the Organizing Committee for the Transpadane European Railway Line.

Illy was honoured with the title of Grande Ufficiale (Order of Merit of the Italian Republic) by the president of the Italian Republic, and the Grand Decoration of Honour in Gold title by the president of the Austrian Republic. He was awarded an honoris causa degree in political sciences at the University of Trieste after his "lectio doctoralis" on the topic of enlargement of Europe to the Eastern Countries.

In 2001, Illy was elected a Member of the Italian Parliament with the mixed group of independent members. He was part of the IX Parliamentary Commission (Transport, Postal Services and Telecommunications) and secretary to the Advisory Parliamentary Commission regarding the bringing into force of the administrative reforms. He has strongly believed in and promoted the referendum not confirming the regional electoral law. When the direct election of the president was obtained, he kept his promise to the citizens of Trieste, and he ran as a candidate for the Friuli-Venezia Giulia Region supported by the Democratic Coalition Party (Intesa Democratica). He was elected president of theregion in the elections held on 8 and 9 June 2003.

He was unanimously elected president of the Assembly of European Regions (AER) in December 2004, and his mandate ended in 2008. The AER currently has 250 member regions from 30 European countries.

On 14 April 2008 Illy was defeated in his re-election bid by candidate Renzo Tondo, and his term as president ended on 18 April 2008.
