= Slovene Union =

Slovene Union Slovenska skupnost
- Leader: Peter Močnik
- Founded: 1963
- Headquarters: Via G. Gallina 5/III, Trieste
- Newspaper: Skupnost
- Ideology: Slovene-speaking minority interests Christian democracy
- Political position: Centre
- National affiliation: Centre-left coalition Autonomies and Environment Pact
- European affiliation: Federal Union of European Nationalities
- Regional Council of Friuli-Venezia Giulia: 1 / 48 (In the Democratic Party)

Website
- www.slovenskaskupnost.org

The Slovene Union (Slovene: Slovenska skupnost, SSk, Italian: Unione Slovena, US) is a political party in Italy representing the Slovene minority in the Friuli-Venezia Giulia region. Its Slovene name means literally "Slovene Community", but the denomination "Slovene Union" is used in other languages.

The party was founded in the 1960s to represent the anti-communist Slovenes in the Italian Julian March (provinces of Trieste and Gorizia). In the 1970s and 1980s, it extended its presence also to Venetian Slovenia and Canale Valley in the Province of Udine. It has been considered to be close to the Catholic Church and has drawn its support from various Slovene Catholic institutions in Italy, such as the Hermagoras Society and the Council of Slovene Organizations.

Since 2007, the SSk is affiliated to the Democratic Party (PD). The relations between the two parties are regulated by an "agreement of federation", which guarantees the full autonomy of the SSk.

== History ==
The SSk was founded in 1962 with the merger of several Slovene anti-communist political organizations that had functioned since 1945 in the Italian part of the Julian March (Venezia Giulia), that is in the provinces Gorizia and Trieste (until 1954 Zone A of the Free Territory of Trieste). These organizations included the Slovene Christian Social Union (Slovenska krščansko socialna zveza, SKSZ), led by Engelbert Besednjak and Avgust Sfiligoj; the liberal Slovene Democratic Union (Slovenska demokratska zveza, SDZ), led by Josip Agneletto and Andrej Uršič; and the social-democratic Group of Independent Slovenes (Skupina neodvisnih Slovencev, SNS), led by Josip Ferfolja, Frane Tončič and Dušan Rybář. All these groups shared an anti-fascist ideology, they were opposed to Italian nationalism and centralism, as well as to the Communist regime of the nearby Socialist Federal Republic of Yugoslavia. Coming from different ideological background, but sharing similar programs, these groups soon established a close collaboration, creating many joint lists in municipal and provincial elections. Between 1947 and 1954, a unitary action was hindered by the fact that the Slovene minority was split into two separate political realities, one in the Republic of Italy and the other in the Free Territory of Trieste.

The SSk has taken part in nearly all general, regional and municipal elections in Friuli-Venezia Giulia since the 1963 general election. Beginning from the late 1960s, it frequently formed alliances with Christian Democracy. Since its foundation, the SSk has maintained close relations with the South Tyrolean People's Party and the Valdostan Union. In the 1992 general election the SSk formed a joint list with the Valdostan Union, the Union for South Tyrol, the Sardinian Action Party, and some smaller regional parties; this effort produced a seat in the Chamber of Deputies and one in the Senate of the Republic, but none of them was for the SSk.

Since the beginning of the so-called Italian Second Republic, the SSk has been in alliance with centre-left coalitions, such as The Olive Tree, and had been an associate party of the Italian People's Party, Democracy is Freedom – The Daisy, and finally the Democratic Party.

== Popular support and representation ==
The party has been represented in the Regional Council from 1975 through 1993, and then again since 2003. In the 2013 regional election the SSk won 1.4% of the vote (4.7% in the Province of Trieste and 2.8% in the Province of Gorizia), resulting in the re-election of its regional councillor.

The party is particularly strong in rural areas on the border with Slovenia in the Provinces of Trieste and Gorizia. In the 2013 regional election it was the most voted party in the municipalities of Monrupino (55.9%), San Floriano del Collio (53.1%) and Savogna d'Isonzo (42.0%), and had a good showing also in San Dorligo della Valle (22.5%), Sgonico (22.2%), Doberdò del Lago (19.8%) and Duino-Aurisina (17.1%). Since the 2000s, the party has gathered some support also in the Province of Udine, especially in the so-called Venetian Slovenia: in 2013 it garnered 19.4% of the vote in Drenchia, 10.8% in Malborghetto Valbruna, and 7.5% in Resia. In big cities, the party reached 5.3% in Gorizia and 3.2% in Trieste. In the municipal and provincial elections of 2011, the candidates of the Slovene Union ran on the list of the Democratic Party, except for the Provincial Council of Trieste, where they ran separately and gained 3.4% of the vote.

== Media ==
The party has an official newspaper, called Skupnost ("Community"). The weekly journal Novi glas ("The New Voice"), published in Gorizia by the Hermagoras Society is also generally supportive of the party's program, policies and ideology, although it is sometimes critical towards its actions.

== Prominent members ==
Several public figures of the Slovene minority in Italy have been public supporters of the Slovene Union, including the authors Boris Pahor and Alojz Rebula, historian Jože Pirjevec, journalist, editor and historian Ivo Jevnikar and others.

== See also ==
- Enotna Lista
