= 2025 Italian local elections =

Italian local elections

The 2025 Italian local elections were held at the municipal level, where the first round were held between April and May and run-off rounds were held on 8 and 9 June of the same year, concurrently with the 2025 Italian referendum. In Trentino-Alto Adige/Südtirol, the elections were held on 4 May. In the Aosta Valley, the elections were held in the autumn. In the 4 municipalities voting in Friuli-Venezia Giulia, the elections were held on 13 and 14 April, with a possible run-off round on 27 and 28 April.

For municipalities that renewed the municipal council in 2020, the vote was postponed to spring 2026; this delay was due to the postponement of the 2020 Italian local elections to September, caused by the COVID-19 pandemic in Italy. In ordinary Italian regions, the consultations only concerned municipalities with early elections. The municipal elections took place in 468 comuni (among the higher municipalities, 9 are capital municipalities, of which 3 are regional capitals), of which there were 75 municipalities with a population greater than 15,000 inhabitants and 393 with a population lower.

== Summary of Municipal Elections ==
=== Municipalities voting by region ===
Geographic distribution of municipalities
Region	Provincial Capitals	Total	
Region	Provincial Capitals	Major Municipalities	Minor Municipalities
Ordinary Statute Regions
Piedmont (details)	0	0	9
Lombardy (details)	0	4	14
Veneto (details)	0	1	8
Liguria (details)	1	1	4
Emilia-Romagna (details)	1	1	4
Tuscany (details)	0	0	0
Umbria (details)	0	1	2
Marche (details)	0	2	0
Lazio (details)	0	3	6
Abruzzo (details)	0	2	4
Molise (details)	0	0	1
Campania (details)	0	7	8
Apulia (details)	1	4	6
Basilicata (details)	1	1	7
Calabria (details)	0	4	13
Total	4	31	86
Special Statute Regions
Aosta Valley (details)	1	1	N/A
Trentino-Alto Adige/Südtirol (details)	2	38	230
Friuli-Venezia Giulia (details)	1	2	2
Sicily (details)	0	1	8
Sardinia (details)	1	1	6
Total	5	43	246
Total Summary
Total	9	74	332

=== Municipal elections in major municipalities ===
Following the first-round vote (25–26 May) in the 31 major municipalities: Centre-left won in 9; Centre-right in 4; Right in 1; Others in 6; 13 municipalities proceeded to a runoff.

Results in major municipalities
Coalition or Party	Municipalities won	Change
Centre‑left	24 / 74	▲3
Centre‑right	16 / 74	▲6
Civic lists	11 / 74	▼4
Centre-right civic lists	7 / 74	▲1
Trentino Tyrolean Autonomist Party (PATT)	3 / 74	▲1
South Tyrolean People's Party (SVP)	2 / 74	▲1
Centre-left civic lists	2 / 74	▼5
Left	2 / 74	▲2
Centre	1 / 74	▲1
Right	1 / 74	▲1
Five Star Movement (M5S)	1 / 74	Steady
Centrist civic lists	0 / 74	▼3
Grand coalitions	0 / 74	▼1
Popular Alternative	0 / 74	▼1

=== Municipal elections in provincial capitals ===
In provincial capitals, the center-left won in the first round in 2 cities, Genoa and Ravenna, while in 2 others, Taranto and Matera, a runoff was needed. In Matera, the outcome was anatra zoppa (Italian for "lame duck"): the elected mayor was from the centre-right coalition, but the lists supporting the centre-left candidate won a majority of votes in the first round, thus they have a majority of council seats.

Region	Municipality	Population (2024)	Outgoing mayor - Party	Elected mayor - Party	First round votes	%	Second round votes	%	Seats
Aosta Valley	Aosta	34,008	Gianni Nuti (Ind.)	TBD					0 / 27
Trentino-Alto Adige/Südtirol	Bolzano	107,914	Renzo Caramaschi (Ind.)	Claudio Corrarati (Ind.)	15,024	36.25%	17,491	51.03%	17 / 45
Trentino-Alto Adige/Südtirol	Trento	118,288	Franco Ianeselli (Ind.)	Franco Ianeselli (Ind.)	27,201	54.65%	—		24 / 40
Friuli-Venezia Giulia	Pordenone	52,365	Alberto Parigi (Note: From 1 July 2024 acting mayor replacing Alessandro Ciriani (Ind.), resigned after election to the European Parliament.) (FdI)	Alessandro Basso (FdI)	11,688	54.03%	—		24 / 40
Liguria	Genoa	564,038	Pietro Piciocchi (Note: From 9 December 2024 acting mayor replacing Marco Bucci (Ind.), elected President of Liguria.) (Ind.)	Silvia Salis (Ind.)	124,720	51.48%	—		24 / 40
Emilia-Romagna	Ravenna	156,150	Fabio Sbaraglia (Note: From 13 December 2024 acting mayor replacing Michele De Pascale (PD), elected President of Emilia-Romagna.) (PD)	Alessandro Barattoni (PD)	35,759	58.15%	—		21 / 32
Apulia	Taranto	185,974	Giuliana Perrotta (Note: From 21 February 2025 extraordinary commissioner replacing Rinaldo Melucci (PD), dismissed following resignation of the majority of city councilors.)	Piero Bitetti (Con)	32,875	37.39%	39,512	54.66%	20 / 32
Basilicata	Matera	60,404	Raffaele Ruberto (Note: From 22 October 2024 extraordinary commissioner replacing Domenico Bennardi (M5S), dismissed following resignation of the majority of city councilors.)	Antonio Nicoletti (Ind.)	11,832	36.98%	13,905	51.31%	11 / 32
Sardinia	Nuoro	36,154	Giovanni Pirisi (Note: From 12 June 2024 extraordinary commissioner replacing Andrea Soddu (Ind.), resigned due to failure to approve the 2024-2026 budget law within the deadline.)	Emiliano Fenu (M5S)	11,289	63.05%	—		16 / 24

== Municipal elections ==
=== Aosta Valley ===
2025 Aosta municipal election
- 28 September 2025
Candidate	Raffaele Rocco	Giovanni Girardini
Party		LRV
Alliance	VdA–CSX	Centre-right
Candidate	Diego Foti	Eugenio Torrione
Party	ADGA	ADGA
Alliance	Open Aosta Valley	Greens and Left
Incumbent Mayor
Gianni Nuti
Ind - CSX

==== Aosta ====
Valdostan Union, Autonomists of the Centre and Democratic Party formed a coalition. PD vetoed the inclusion of Forza Italia, and UV and AdC vetoed Civic Network–Greens and Left Alliance.

=== Trentino-Alto Adige/Südtirol ===
Elections were held in 265 municipal councils in Trentino-Alto Adige/Südtirol. Results shown correspond to the 38 higher municipalities including the two provincial capitals of Bolzano and Trent.

==== Regional Summary ====
Summary of Elected Councils in Trentino-Alto Adige/Südtirol
38 higher municipalities
Party or Coalition	Councils	▲/▼
Localist civic lists	8 / 38	▼3
Centre-right	8 / 38	▲4
Civic lists of the centre-right	8 / 38	▼1
Centre-left	6 / 38	▼3
Civic lists of the centre-left	3 / 38	▲1
Trentino Tyrolean Autonomist Party	3 / 38	▲1
South Tyrolean People's Party	2 / 38	▲1
Left-wing	1 / 38	▲1

==== Autonomous Province of Bolzano ====
===== Bolzano (provincial capital) =====
2025 Bolzano municipal elections
- May 4, 2025; Runoff: May 18, 2025
- Turnout: 52.2 (▼8.5%) - Round 1; 42.8% - Runoff
	Majority party	Minority party
Candidate	Claudio Corrati	Juri Andriollo
Party	Civic list	Democratic Party
Alliance	Centre-right	Centre-left
Seats before	16 / 45	23 / 45
Seats won	17 / 45	12 / 45
Seat change	▲1	▼11
Popular vote	15,024 (I); 17,491 (II)	11,326 (I); 16,784 (II)
Percentage	36.25% (I); 51.03% (II)	27.31% (I); 47.97% (II)
Swing	▲3.12%	▼6.63%
Mayor before election
Renzo Caramaschi
Ind - CSX
Elected mayor
Claudio Corrati
Ind - CDX

Candidates made official on 18 March 2025.

The mayoralty flipped from the centre-left to the centre-right.

Graph of the party split among 45 seats.
Candidates	Round I		Round II		Lists	Votes	%	Seats
Candidates	Votes	%	Votes	%	Lists	Votes	%	Seats
Claudio Corrarati	15,024	36.25	17,491	51.03	Brothers of Italy	5,724	15.4	7
Claudio Corrarati	15,024	36.25	17,491	51.03	The Civic for Bolzano	4,343	11.68	6
Claudio Corrarati	15,024	36.25	17,491	51.03	League for Salvini Premier	1,856	4.99	2
Claudio Corrarati	15,024	36.25	17,491	51.03	Forza Italia	1,156	3.11	2
Claudio Corrarati	15,024	36.25	17,491	51.03	Total centre-right coalition:	13,079	35.19	17
Juri Andriollo (Note: Candidate later informally endorsed by M5S for the run-off.)	11,326	27.31	16,784	47.97	Democratic Party (Note: Including candidates of PSI)	4,666	12.55	6
Juri Andriollo	11,326	27.31	16,784	47.97	Greens of South Tyrol – Sinistra (Note: Including candidates of EV)	2,911	7.83	4
Juri Andriollo	11,326	27.31	16,784	47.97	Civic List with Juri Andriollo (Note: Including candidates of the Civic List with Caramaschi)	1,953	5.25	1
Juri Andriollo	11,326	27.31	16,784	47.97	Restart	489	1.32	—
Juri Andriollo	11,326	27.31	16,784	47.97	Centre-left coalition candidate's seat			1
Juri Andriollo	11,326	27.31	16,784	47.97	Total centre-left coalition:	10,019	26.96	12
Stephan Konder	6,269	15.11	—		South Tyrolean People's Party	6,002	16.15	6
Stephan Konder	6,269	15.11	—		SVP candidate's seat			1
Angel Gennaccaro	5,185	12.5	—		La Civica – I am with Bolzano	4,788	12.88	5
Angel Gennaccaro	5,185	12.5	—		Coalition seat			1
Matthias Cologne	2,837	6.84	—		Team K	2,610	7.02	2
Matthias Cologne	2,837	6.84	—		Coalition seat			1
Simonetta Lucchi	827	1.99	—		Five Star Movement	514	1.38	—
Simonetta Lucchi	827	1.99	—		Communist Refoundation Party - Peace and Rights	157	0.42	—
Total	34,275	100	37,169	100		37,169	100	45

===== Bruneck =====
2025 Bruneck municipal elections
- May 5, 2025
- Turnout: 52.1% (▼8.8%)
	Majority party	Minority party
Candidate	Bruno Wolf	Maximilian Gartner
Party	SVP	Greens
Seats before	15 / 27	3 / 27
Seats won	14 / 27	5 / 27
Seat change	▼1	▲2
Popular vote	3,712	1,208
Percentage	51.84% (M-E); 51.78% (P-L)	16.87% (M-E); 16.89% (P-L)
Swing	▼3.37%	▲4.50%
Mayor before election
Roland Griessmair
SVP
Elected mayor
Bruno Wolf
SVP

No coalitions were formed in the local election in Bruneck as all parties ran separately.

Graph of the party split among 27 seats.
Candidates	Votes	%	Party	Votes	%	Seats
Bruno Wolf	3,712	51.84	South Tyrolean People's Party	3,703	51.78	14
Maximilian Gartner	1,208	16.87	Greens of South Tyrol	1,208	16.89	4
Maximilian Gartner	1,208	16.87	Green mayor candidate's seat			1
Wilma Huber	825	11.52	Team K	825	11.54	2
Wilma Huber	825	11.52	Team K mayor candidate's seat			1
Bernhard Hilber	540	7.54	South Tyrolean Freedom	540	7.55	2
Bernhard Hilber	540	7.54	South Tyrolean Freedom mayor candidate's seat			1
Antonio Bovenzi	519	7.25	The Pole - Civic for Brunico	519	7.26	1
Antonio Bovenzi	519	7.25	The Pole - Civic for Brunico mayor candidate's seat			1
Andrea Bovo	268	3.74	For Brunico	268	3.75	—
Andrea Bovo	268	3.74	For Brunico mayor candidate's seat (Note: Marco Pellizzari took the seat instead of Bovo.)			1
Markus Falk	88	1.25	I love Brunico (Note: Includes candidates from M5S.)	88	1.25	—
Total:	7,160	100		7,151	100	27

===== Merano =====
2025 Merano municipal elections
- May 4, 2025; Runoff: May 18, 2025
- Turnout: 49.3% (▼2.7%)
	Majority party	Minority party
Candidate	Katharina Johanna Zeller	Dario del Medico
Party	SVP	Independent
Alliance	SVP-MGM	Centre-right civic list
Seats before	7 / 36	12 / 36
Seats won	12 / 36	11 / 36
Seat change	▲4	▼1
Popular vote	5,005 (I); 7,226 (II)	4,809 (I); 5,385 (II)
Percentage	32.96 (I); 57.43% (II)	31.67% (I); 42.57% (II)
Swing	▲38.03%	▼7.73%
Mayor before election
Dario Del Medico
Centre-right civic list
Elected mayor
Katharina Johanna Zeller
SVP

Graph of the party split among 35 seats.
Candidates	Round I		Round II		Party	Votes	%	Seats
Candidates	Votes	%	Votes	%	Party	Votes	%	Seats
Katharina Johanna Zeller	5,005	32.96	7,266	57.43	South Tyrolean People's Party	4,087	29.71	11
Katharina Johanna Zeller	5,005	32.96	7,266	57.43	Mutiges Courageous Merano	506	3.68	1
Katharina Johanna Zeller	5,005	32.96	7,266	57.43	Total regionalist coalition:	4,593	33.39	12
Dario del Medico (Note: Candidate endorsed by FI.)	4,809	31.67	5,385	42.57	Alliance for Merano	2,455	17.84	6
Dario del Medico	4,809	31.67	5,385	42.57	The Civic for Merano	987	7.17	3
Dario del Medico	4,809	31.67	5,385	42.57	Del Medico Mayor	925	6.72	1
Dario del Medico	4,809	31.67	5,385	42.57	Coalition candidate's seat			1
Dario del Medico	4,809	31.67	5,385	42.57	Total centre-right civic coalition:	4,367	31.73	11
Ulrike Ceresara (Note: The PD and M5S lists that supported Ulrike Cerasara for the first round later informally endorsed Katharina Johanna Zeller for the second round.)	3,530	23.35	—		Greens of South Tyrol (Note: List backed by EV.)	1,750	12.72	4
Ulrike Ceresara	3,530	23.35	—		Democratic Party (Note: Includes candidates of Volt.)	655	4.83	2
Ulrike Ceresara	3,530	23.35	—		Team K	339	2.46	1
Ulrike Ceresara	3,530	23.35	—		The Left Alto-Adige / Südtirol (Note: Including candidates of SI.)	219	1.59	1
Ulrike Ceresara	3,530	23.35	—		Five Star Movement	183	1.33	—
Ulrike Ceresara	3,530	23.35	—		Centre-left coalition candidate's seat			1
Ulrike Ceresara	3,530	23.35	—		Total centre-left coalition:	3,146	22.93	9
Elena Da Molin	1,436	9.46	—		Giorgia Meloni - Brothers of Italy	1,120	8.14	2
Elena Da Molin	1,436	9.46	—		League for Salvini Premier	149	1.08	—
Elena Da Molin	1,436	9.46	—		Coalition candidate's seat			1
Elena Da Molin	1,436	9.46	—		Total right-wing coalition:	1,269	9.22	3
Jasmin Netschada	406	2.67	—		South Tyrolean Freedom	373	2.71	1
Total:	15,186	100	12,652	100		13,758	100	37

==== Autonomous Province of Trentino ====
Source of all results for Trentino Province:

- Round 1:
- Round 2 (ballotage runoffs where applicable):

===== Trento (provincial capital) =====
2025 Trento municipal elections
- 4 May 2025
- Turnout: 49.93% (▼11.05%)
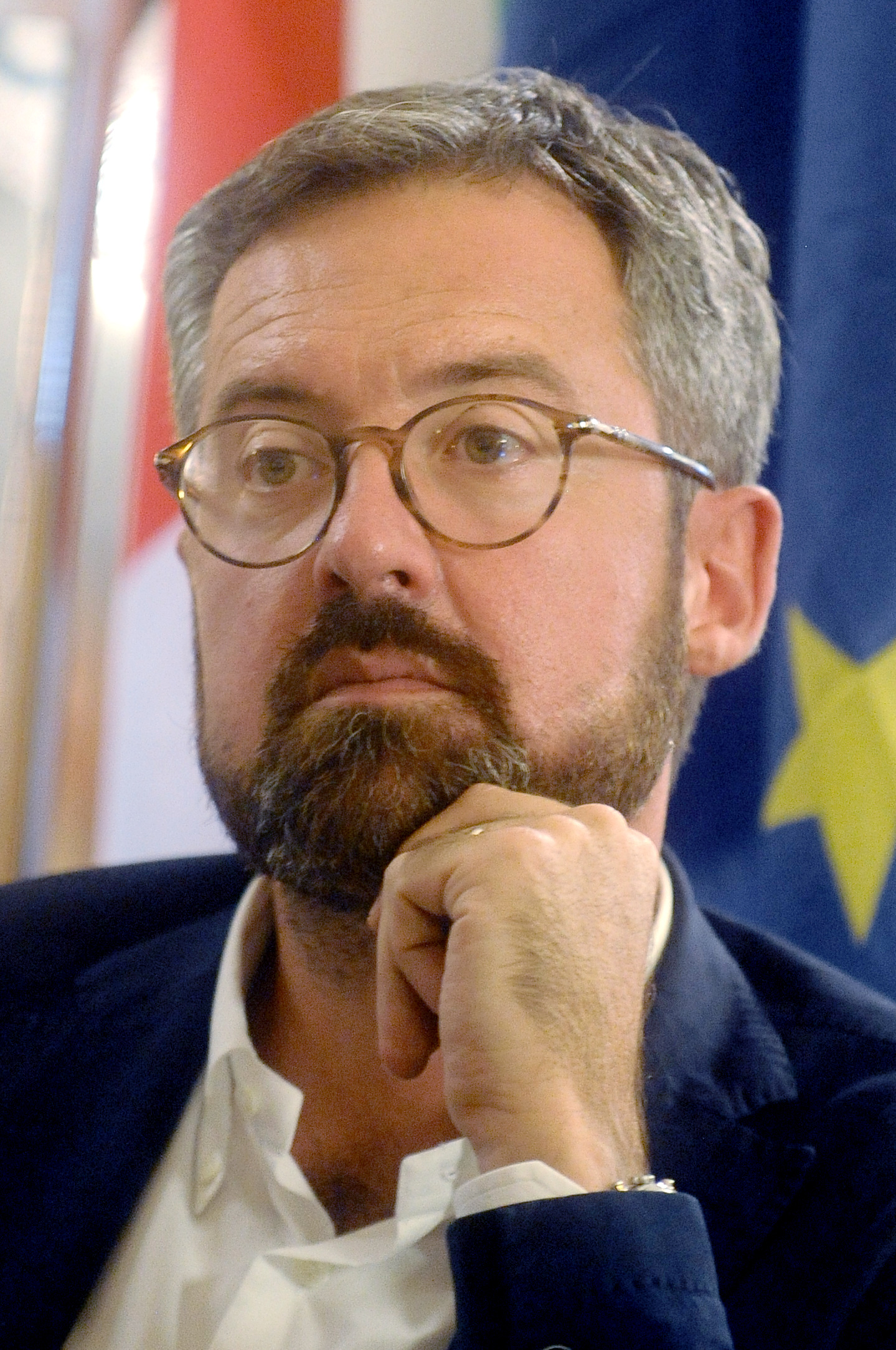
	Majority party	Minority party
		CDX
Candidate	Franco Ianeselli	Ilaria Goio
Party	Independent	Independent
Alliance	Centre-left	Centre-right
Seats before	25 / 39	13 / 39
Seats won	24 / 40	11 / 40
Popular vote	27,201	13,241
Percentage	54.65%	26.6%
Swing	▼0.01%	▼3.62%
Mayor before election
Franco Ianeselli
Ind - CSX
Elected mayor
Franco Ianeselli
Ind - CSX

Candidates made official on 19 March 2025.

Graph of the party split among 33 seats.
Party or alliance		Candidate	Party-list		Directly-elected Mayor		Seats
Party or alliance		Candidate	Votes	%	Votes	%	Seats
Centre-left	Democratic Party	Franco Ianeselli	11,080	24.64	27,201	54.65	12
Centre-left	Base camp	Franco Ianeselli	4,446	9.89	27,201	54.65	4
Centre-left	Together for Trento	Franco Ianeselli	4,013	8.92	27,201	54.65	4
Centre-left	Greens and Left Alliance	Franco Ianeselli	2,369	5.27	27,201	54.65	2
Centre-left	Agreement for Ianeselli Mayor	Franco Ianeselli	1,746	3.88	27,201	54.65	1
Centre-left	Yes Trento (Note: Including candidates of CA, +E, IV and Azione.)	Franco Ianeselli	1,373	3.05	27,201	54.65	1
Centre-left	Total	Franco Ianeselli	25,027	55.65	27,201	54.65	24
Centre-right	Brothers of Italy	Ilaria Goio	6,494	14.44	13,241	26.60	6
Centre-right	League	Ilaria Goio	3,051	6.78	13,241	26.60	2
Centre-right	Forza Italia	Ilaria Goio	1,931	4.29	13,241	26.60	1
Centre-right	Coalition candidate's seat	Ilaria Goio			13,241	26.60	1
Centre-right	Total		11,476	25.52	13,241	26.60	10
Left-wing	Wave	Giulia Bortolotti	1,358	3.02	3,689	7.41	1
Left-wing	Five Star Movement	Giulia Bortolotti	1,006	2.24	3,689	7.41	–
Left-wing	Communist Refoundation Party	Giulia Bortolotti	740	1.65	3,689	7.41	–
Left-wing	Coalition candidate's seat	Giulia Bortolotti			3,689	7.41	1
Left-wing	Total	Giulia Bortolotti	3,104	6.90	3,689	7.41	2
Centre-left civic list	Generation Trento	Claudio Geat	2,333	5.19	2,492	5.01	1
Centre-left civic list	Coalition candidate's seat	Claudio Geat			2,492	5.01	1
Centre-right civic list	First Trento (Note: Includes candidates from PATT, the Civic and We Trento (Fugatti List))	Andrea Demarchi	2,241	4.98	2,312	4.65	–
Centre-right civic list	Coalition candidate's seat	Andrea Demarchi			2,312	4.65	1
Sovereign Popular Democracy		Simonetta Gabrielli	789	1.75	835	1.68	–
Total			44,970	100.00	49,770	100.00	39

===== Aldeno =====
Party	Mayor Candidate	Party-list		Directly-elected Mayor		Seats
Party	Mayor Candidate	Votes	%	Votes	%	Seats
Aldeno Together	Alida Cramerotti	1,359	100.00	1,439	100.00	17
Total		1,359	100.00	1,439	100.00	17

===== Altopiano della Vigolana =====
Party or alliance		Mayor Candidate	Party-list		Directly-elected mayor		Seats
Party or alliance		Mayor Candidate	Votes	%	Votes	%	Seats
Centre-left	Pact with the Vigolana community	Armando Tamanini	834	33.48	1,449	54.45	7
Centre-left	Walking with the Vigolana community	Armando Tamanini	479	19.23	1,449	54.45	4
Centre-left	Total	Armando Tamanini	1,313	52.71	1,449	54.45	11
Vigolana to live in (Note: Includes candidates from Lega.)	Vigolana to live in	Linda Tamanini	1,178	47.29	1,212	45.55	5
Vigolana to live in	Coalition candidate's seat	Linda Tamanini				–	1
Total			2,491	100.00	2,661	100.00	17

===== Arco =====
2025 Arco municipal elections
- May 4, 2025; Runoff: May 18, 2025
- Turnout: 53.12% (▼1.07%)
	Majority party	Minority party
Candidate	Arianna Florio	Alessandro Amistadi
Party	Independent	Independent
Alliance	Left-wing	Centre-right
Last election	3 / 22	3 / 22
Seats won	15 / 22	3 / 22
Seat change	▲12	Steady
Popular vote	3,045 (I); 4,459 (II)	2,543 (I); 2,665 (II)
Percentage	35.57% (I); 62.59% (II)	29.71% (I); 37.41% (II)
Swing	▲13.09%	▲6.04%
Mayor before election
Alessandro Betta
Democratic Party
Mayor
Arianna Fiorio
Independent

====== Directly-elected Mayor ======
Candidate	Coalition	First round		Second round	
Candidate	Coalition	Votes	%	Votes	%
Arianna Fiorio	Left-wing	3,045	35.57	4,459	62.59
Alessandro Amistadi	Centre-right	2,543	29.71	2,665	37.41
Dario Ioppi	Centre-left	1,937	22.63		
Mauro Ottobre (Note: Informally endorsed Arianna Florio for the run-off.)	Centre	1,035	12.09		
Total		8,560	100.00	7,124	100.00

====== Party-list ======
Graph of the party split among 14 seats.
Party or alliance		Votes	%	Seats
Left-wing	Civic Olvaia - Ethics and Environment	1,041	13.58	6
Left-wing	Wave	400	5.22	2
Left-wing	Green Europe	338	4.41	2
Left-wing	Work and Environment Community	320	4.17	2
Left-wing	Popular Civic Proposition	273	3.56	1
Left-wing	Tomorrow Youth in Action	260	3.39	1
Left-wing	Total	2,632	34.34	14
Centre-right	We Arco (Note: Includes candidates of Azione.)	610	7.96	1
Centre-right	Trentino Tyrolean Autonomist Party	510	6.65	1
Centre-right	SiAmo Arco	454	5.92	–
Centre-right	Brothers of Italy	394	5.14	–
Centre-right	League	355	4.63	–
Centre-right	Forza Italia	52	0.68	–
Centre-right	Coalition candidate's seat			1
Centre-right	Total	2,375	30.98	3
Centre-left	Democratic Party	959	12.51	1
Centre-left	Base camp	483	6.30	1
Centre-left	Autonomy House.eu	202	2.64	–
Centre-left	Forging a Common Arco	151	1.97	–
Centre-left	Coalition candidate's seat			1
Centre-left	Total	1,795	23.42	3
Centre	Dynamic Arco	556	7.25	–
Centre	Frazioni at the Centre	307	4.01	–
Centre	Coalition candidate's seat			1
Centre	Total	863	11.26	–
Total		7,665	100.00	21

===== Avio =====
2025 Avio municipal elections
- May 4, 2025; Runoff: May 18, 2025
- Turnout: 62.00% (▲0.33%)
	Majority party	Minority party
Candidate	Ivano Fracchetti	Federico Secchi
Party	League	PATT
Alliance	Centre-right	PATT-led autonomists
Last election	11 / 18	4 / 18
Seats won	11 / 18	4 / 18
Seat change	Steady	Steady
Popular vote	1,136 (I); 1,258 (II)	713 (I); 716 (II)
Percentage	47.89% (I); 63.83% (II)	30.19% (I); 36.17% (II)
Swing	▲5.28%	▼8.98%
Mayor before election
Ivano Fracchetti
Lega
Mayor
Ivano Fracchetti
Lega

====== Directly-elected Mayor ======
Candidate	Party or alliance		First round		Second round	
Candidate	Party or alliance		Votes	%	Votes	%
Ivano Fracchetti	Centre-right	League	1,136	47.89	1,258	63.83
Federico Secchi	PATT-led autonomists	PATT	716	30.19	713	36.17
Marco Pilati	Localist civic list	Independent	279	11.76		
Zampedri Tullio	Centre-left	Independent	241	10.16		
Total			2,372	100.00	1,971	100.00

====== Party-list ======
Graph of the party split among 11 seats.
Party or alliance		Votes	%	Seats
Centre-right	Civics for Good Government	410	18.39	5
Centre-right	League Avio Salvini	328	14.72	3
Centre-right	Ivano Fracchetti Mayor	229	10.27	2
Centre-right	Avio of the Centre	109	4.89	1
Centre-right	Total	1,076	48.27	11
PATT-led autonomists	Civic Secchi Mayor	287	12.88	2
PATT-led autonomists	We are Avio	183	8.21	1
PATT-led autonomists	Autonomist Heart (Note: Includes candidates of PATT.)	112	5.02	–
PATT-led autonomists	Common Project	73	3.28	–
PATT-led autonomists	Coalition candidate's seat			1
PATT-led autonomists	Total	655	29.39	4
Civic list	Autonomists and Civics (Note: Includes dissidents of PATT and candidates of CA.eu.)	267	11.98	–
Civic list	Coalition candidate's seat			1
Centre-left	Avio for everyone (Note: Includes candidates of the two constituent parties of AVS, fielded separately.)	231	10.36	–
Centre-left	Coalition candidate's seat			1
Total		2,229	100.00	17

===== Baselga di Pinè =====
Graph of the party split among 17 seats.
Candidate	Party or alliance		Party-list		Directly-elected Mayor		Seats
Candidate	Party or alliance		Votes	%	Votes	%	Seats
Alessandro Santuari	Centre-right	Future Pinè Civic List	919	37.25	2,601	100.00	6
Alessandro Santuari	Centre-right	We for Pinè (Note: Includes candidates of Lega and FdI)	861	34.90	2,601	100.00	6
Alessandro Santuari	Centre-right	Autonomists for Pinè	687	27.85	2,601	100.00	5
Total			2,467	100.00	2,601	100.00	17

===== Borgo Valsugana =====
2025 Borgo Valsugana municipal elections
- May 4, 2025; Runoff: May 18, 2025
- Turnout: 51.73% (▼3.46%)
	Majority party	Minority party
Candidate	Ferrai Martina	Enrico Galvan
Party	Independent	Independent
Alliance	Centre-left	Centre-right civic list
Last election	3 / 18	11 / 18
Seats won	11 / 17	4 / 17
Popular vote	1,561 (I); 2,141 (II)	1,045 (I); 1,366 (II)
Percentage	41.21% (I); 61.05% (II)	27.59% (I); 38.95% (II)
Swing	▲13.89%	▼13.89%
Mayor before election
Enrico Galvan
Independent - Civic list (CDX)
Mayor
Ferrai Martina
Independent (CSX)

====== Directly-elected Mayor ======
Candidate	Party or alliance		First round		Second round	
Candidate	Party or alliance		Votes	%	Votes	%
Ferrai Martina (Note: With the endorsement of PD.)	Centre-left	Independent	1,561	41.21	2,141	61.05
Enrico Galvan	Centre-right civic list	Independent	1,045	27.59	1,366	38.95
Fabio Dalledonne (Note: The candidate's lists endorsed Enrico Galvan in the runoff.)	Centre-right civic list	Independent	1,001	26.43		
Armando Orsingher	Centre-left civic list	Independent	181	4.78		
Total			3,788	100.00	3,507	100.00
Centre-left gain						

====== Party-list ======
Graph of the party split among 8 seats.
Party or alliance		Votes	%	Seats	+/–
Centre-left	Borgo Olle at the Centre	906	28.22	8	–
Centre-left	Future Community	446	13.89	3	–
Centre-left	Total	1,352	42.11	11	–
Centre-right civic list	Borgo and Olle Common Good	511	15.91	2	▼5
Centre-right civic list	Borgo Tomorrow	399	12.43	1	▼3
Centre-right civic list	Coalition candidate's seat			1	–
Centre-right civic list	Total	910	28.34	4	–
Centre-right civic list	Fabio Dalledonne Civic List	439	13.67	1	–
Centre-right civic list	"Together Borgo and Olle" Civic List	364	11.34	–	–
Centre-right civic list	Coalition candidate's seat			1	–
Centre-right civic list	Total	803	25.01	2	–
Centre-left civic list	Reliving Borgo (Note: Includes candidates from CA.eu.)	75	2.34	–	–
Centre-left civic list	Civic Heart - Orsingher Mayor	71	2.21	–	–
Centre-left civic list	Total	146	4.55	–	–
Total		3,211	100.00	17	–

===== Brentonico =====
2025 Brentonico municipal elections
- May 4, 2025
- Turnout: 63.21% (▲4.26%)
	Majority party	Minority party
Candidate	Mauro Tonolli	Dante Dossi
Party	Independent	Democratic Party
Alliance	Civic lists	Centre-left
Seats before	5 / 17	11 / 17
Seats won	11 / 17	4 / 17
Seat change	▲6	▼7
Popular vote	1210	678
Percentage	53%	29.70%
Mayor before election
Dante Dossi
Democratic Party
Elected mayor
Mauro Tonolli
Ind. - Civic list

Graph of the party split among 9 seats.
Candidate	Party or alliance		First round		Second round		Seats
Candidate	Party or alliance		Votes	%	Votes	%	Seats
Mauro Tonolli	Civic lists coalition	We for Brentonico	441	20.90	1,210	53.00	5
Mauro Tonolli	Civic lists coalition	Common project for Brentonico	346	16.40	1,210	53.00	3
Mauro Tonolli	Civic lists coalition	Civic Office	319	15.12	1,210	53.00	3
Mauro Tonolli	Civic lists coalition	Total	1,106	52.42	1,210	53.00	11
Dante Dossi	Centre-left	Together we can (Note: Includes candidates from PD and PATT)	631	29.91	678	29.70	3
Dante Dossi	Centre-left	Coalition candidate's seat			678	29.70	1
Mauro Dossi	Centre-right	Doing good for Brentonico (Note: Includes candidates from Lega and PATT)	373	17.68	395	17.30	1
Mauro Dossi	Centre-right	Coalition candidate's seat			395	17.30	1
Total			2,110	100.00	2,283	100.00	17

=== Friuli-Venezia Giulia ===
Elections were held in 4 municipal councils in Friuli-Venezia Giulia.

==== Regional Summary ====
2 higher municipalities
Party or Coalition	Councils	▲/▼
Centre-right	2 / 2	Steady
2 lower municipalities
Party or Coalition	Councils	▲/▼
Centre-left	1 / 2	Steady
Civic lists of the centre-left	1 / 2	Steady

==== Higher municipalities ====
===== Pordenone =====
2025 Pordenone municipal election
- 13–14 April 2025
- Turnout: 50.72% (▼4.33%)
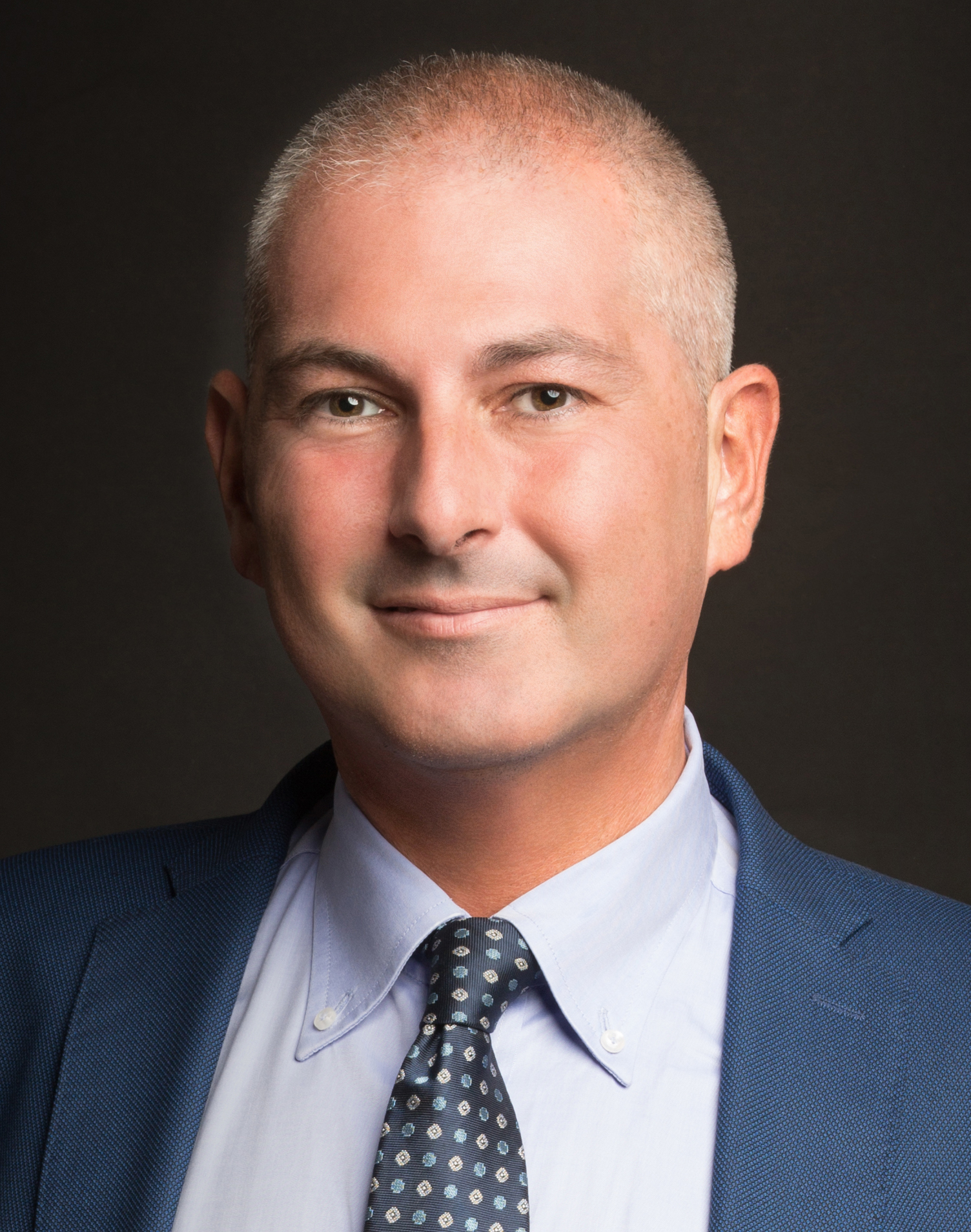
	Majority party	Minority party
		PD
Candidate	Alessandro Basso	Nicola Conficoni
Party	Brothers of Italy	Democratic Party
Alliance	Centre-right	Centre-left
Last election	24 / 40	13 / 40
Seats won	24 / 40	14 / 40
Popular vote	11,688	7,703
Percentage	54.03%	35.61%
Swing	▼11.35%	▲6.72%
Mayor before election
Alberto Parigi
Brothers of Italy
Elected mayor
Alessandro Basso
Brothers of Italy

Graph of the party split among 40 seats.
Candidates	Votes	%	Lists	Votes	%	Seats
Alessandro Basso	11,688	54.03	Brothers of Italy	4,250	22.53	10
Alessandro Basso	11,688	54.03	Pordenone Changes – Ciriani List	2,104	11.16	5
Alessandro Basso	11,688	54.03	Civic Pordenone	1,667	8.84	4
Alessandro Basso	11,688	54.03	League	1,486	7.88	3
Alessandro Basso	11,688	54.03	Forza Italia	1,102	5.84	2
Alessandro Basso	11,688	54.03	Total centre-right coalition:	10,609	56.25	24
Nicholas Conficoni	7,703	35.61	Democratic Party	3,745	19.86	8
Nicholas Conficoni	7,703	35.61	Pordenone in Health	1,259	6.68	3
Nicholas Conficoni	7,703	35.61	The Common Good (Note: Includes candidates from SI, EV, PRC, and Open FRG.)	989	5.24	2
Nicholas Conficoni	7,703	35.61	Italia Viva	263	1.39	—
Nicholas Conficoni	7,703	35.61	There is another Pordenone	259	1.37	—
Nicholas Conficoni	7,703	35.61	Centre-left Coalition Candidate's seat			1
Nicholas Conficoni	7,703	35.61	Total centre-left coalition:	6,256	33.17	14
Marco Salvador (Note: Backed by Azione, M5S and Civic FVG.)	1,645	7.60	Salvador Mayor	1,305	6.92	1
Marco Salvador	1,645	7.60	Salvador coalition candidate's seat			1
Anna Ciriani	595	2.75	#AmiAmoPordenone	432	2.29	0
Total	21,631	100		18,861	100	40

===== Monfalcone =====
2025 Monfalcone municipal election
- Between April 13, 2025 and April 14, 2025

24 municipal council seats up for election
- Turnout: 57.3% (▲5.5%)
	Majority party	Minority party
Candidate	Luca Fasan	Diego Moretti
Party	Lega	Democratic Party
Alliance	Centre-right	Centre-left
Seats before	18 / 24	6 / 24
Seats won	18 / 24	6 / 24
Seat change	Steady	Steady
Popular vote	8,272	3,057
Percentage	70.87%	26.19%
Swing	▼1.53%	▲2.1%
Mayor before election
Anna Maria Cisint
Lega
Elected mayor
Luca Fasan
Lega

The election in Monfalcone had high media coverage during the campaign period due to the presence of an Islamist municipal list called Plural Italy led by candidate for mayor Bou Konate, a Senegalese Muslim. The list only missed winning a single council seat by a mere 0.06%, therefore barely missing the electoral threshold of 3%. The League within the centre-right coalition won the election in a landslide with 70.87%.

Graph of the party split among 24 seats.
Candidates	Votes	%	Lists	Votes	%	Seats
Luca Fasan	8,272	70.87	League	3,214	31.04	9
Luca Fasan	8,272	70.87	Cisint for Monfalcone - Fasan Mayor	2,491	24.05	6
Luca Fasan	8,272	70.87	Brothers of Italy	1,008	9.73	2
Luca Fasan	8,272	70.87	Forza Italia	593	5.73	1
Luca Fasan	8,272	70.87	The People of the Family	124	1.20	—
Luca Fasan	8,272	70.87	Total centre-right coalition:	7,430	71.75	18
Diego Moretti	3,057	26.19	Democratic Party	1,110	10.72	2
Diego Moretti	3,057	26.19	Civic and Solidary Monfalcone (Note: Includes candidates from PpA, M5S and AVS.)	884	8.54	2
Diego Moretti	3,057	26.19	Together with Moretti	392	3.79	1
Diego Moretti	3,057	26.19	Progressives for Monfalcone	263	2.54	—
Diego Moretti	3,057	26.19	Centre-left coalition candidate's seat			1
Diego Moretti	3,057	26.19	Total centre-left coalition:	2,649	25.58	6
Bou Konate	343	2.94	Plural Italy	277	2.67	—
Total:	11,672	100		10,356	100	24

==== Lower municipalities ====
===== Nimis =====
Graph of the party split among 8 seats.
Party or alliance		Mayor Candidate	Party-list		Directly-elected Mayor		Seats
Party or alliance		Mayor Candidate	Votes	%	Votes	%	Seats
Civic coalition	Nimis Objective	Fabrizio Mattiuzza	716	70.06	795	63.55	8
Civic coalition	Chei mancul piês	Sergio Bonfini	172	16.83	456	36.45	2
Civic coalition	Nimis Recommences	Sergio Bonfini	134	13.11	456	36.45	1
Civic coalition	Coalition candidate's seat	Sergio Bonfini			456	36.45	1
Civic coalition	Total		306	29.94	456	36.45	4
Total			1,022	100.00	1,251	100.00	12

===== San Pier d'Isonzo =====
Graph of the party split among 9 seats.
Candidate	Party or alliance		First round		Second round		Seats
Candidate	Party or alliance		Votes	%	Votes	%	Seats
Denise Zucco	Centre-left	San Piero Common Ideas	211	26.95	685	68.84	3
Denise Zucco	Centre-left	Together for San Piero	164	20.95	685	68.84	3
Denise Zucco	Centre-left	Democratic Party	155	19.80	685	68.84	2
Denise Zucco	Centre-left	Total	530	67.69	685	68.84	8
Alex D'Aronco	Centre-right	For San Pier	253	32.31	310	31.16	3
Alex D'Aronco	Centre-right	Coalition candidate's seat			310	31.16	1
Total			783	100.00	995	100.00	12

=== Liguria ===
==== Regional Summary ====
1 Metropolitan City - Genoa
Party or Coalition	Councils	▲/▼
Centre-left	1 / 1	▲1
Centre-left gain from centre-right
4 lower municipalities
Localist civic lists	2 / 4	▲1
Centrists	1 / 4	Steady
Centre-left civic lists	1 / 4	Steady
Centre-right civic lists	0 / 4	▼1

==== Metropolitan City of Genoa ====
===== Genoa =====
2025 Genoa municipal elections
- May 25, 2025-May 26, 2025
- Turnout: 51.9% (▲7.73%)
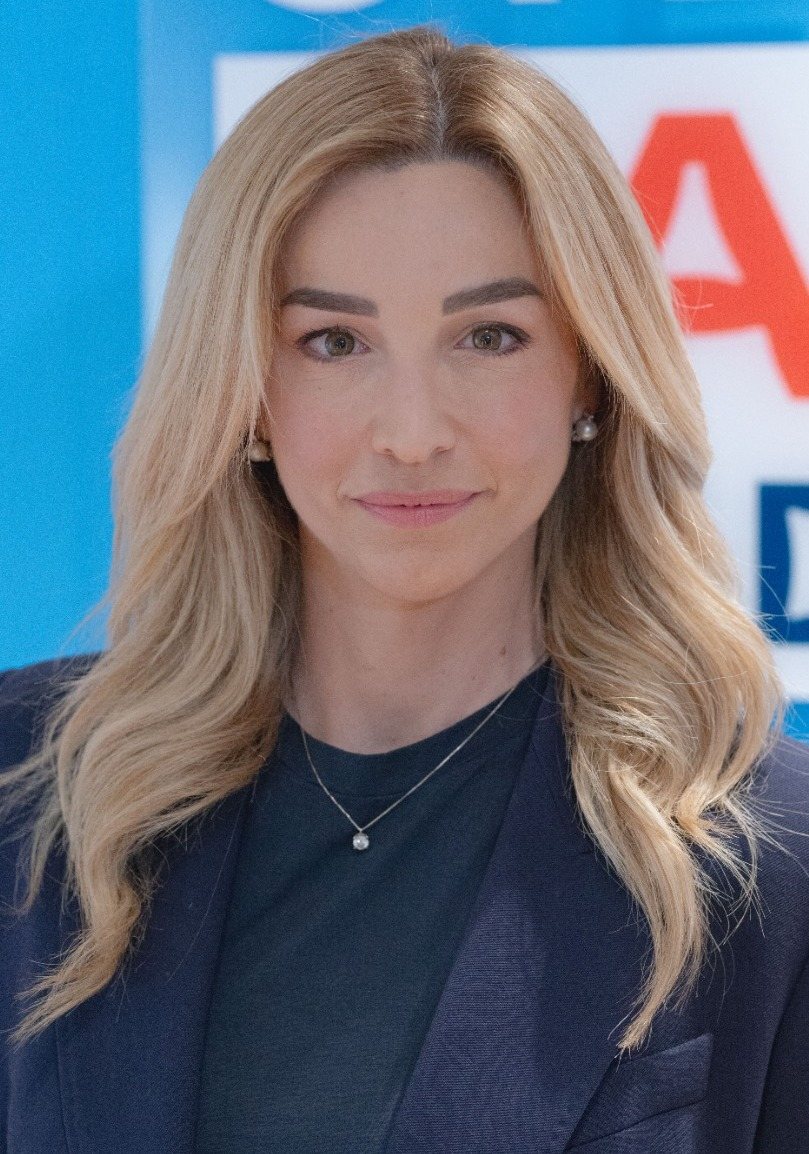

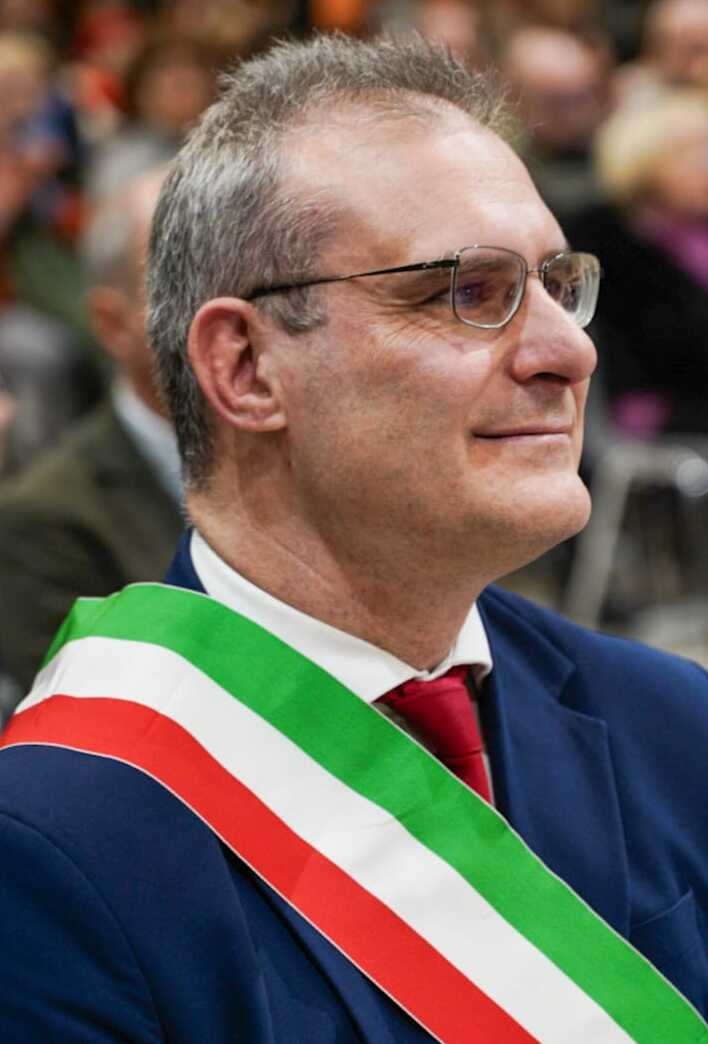
	Majority party	Minority party
Candidate	Silvia Salis	Pietro Piciocchi
Party	Independent	Brothers of Italy
Alliance	Centre-left	Centre-right
Seats before	14 / 40	24 / 40
Seats won	24 / 40	16 / 40
Seat change	▲10	▼8
Popular vote	124,720	107,091
Percentage	51.48%	44.20%
Swing	▲13.45%	▼11.29
Mayor before election
Marco Bucci
Ind - Bucci Coalition (CDX)
Elected mayor
Silvia Salis
Ind - Salis Coalition (CSX)

The election took place on the 25–26 May 2025 with Silvia Salis winning.

Graph of the party split among 37 seats.
Party or alliance		Mayor candidate	Party-list		Directly-elected Mayor		Seats
Party or alliance		Mayor candidate	Votes	%	Votes	%	Seats
Centre-left	Democratic Party (Note: Includes candidates from PSI and Possibile.)	Silvia Salis	65,960	29.06	124,720	51.48	14
Centre-left	Silvia Salis Mayor (Note: Includes candidates from Shared Line and Volt.)	Silvia Salis	18,853	8.31	124,720	51.48	4
Centre-left	Greens and Left Alliance	Silvia Salis	15,705	6.92	124,720	51.48	3
Centre-left	Five Star Movement	Silvia Salis	11,583	5.10	124,720	51.48	2
Centre-left	Let's Reform Genoa with Silvia Salis (Note: Includes candidates from Action, DemoS, IV and +E.)	Silvia Salis	5,405	2.38	124,720	51.48	1
Centre-left	Total		117,506	51.77	124,720	51.48	24
Centre-right	Brothers of Italy	Pietro Piciocchi	28,234	12.44	107,091	44.20	5
Centre-right	Genoa Wins	Pietro Piciocchi	24,237	10.68	107,091	44.20	4
Centre-right	Us Moderates - Bucci Genoa Pride	Pietro Piciocchi	17,806	7.84	107,091	44.20	3
Centre-right	League	Pietro Piciocchi	15,757	6.94	107,091	44.20	2
Centre-right	Forza Italia	Pietro Piciocchi	8,589	3.78	107,091	44.20	1
Centre-right	New Italian Socialist Party - Christian Democracy	Pietro Piciocchi	3,752	1.65	107,091	44.20	–
Centre-right	Union of the Centre	Pietro Piciocchi	1,189	0.52	107,091	44.20	–
Centre-right	Coalition candidate's seat	Pietro Piciocchi			107,091	44.20	1
Centre-right	Total		99,564	43.86	107,091	44.20	–
United for the Constitution (Note: Includes candidates from Ancora Italia, Circolo Culturale Proletario, Contronarrazione, Demos, Nuovo Ordine Internazionalista, Popolo Unito, Giovani Genovesi and SiAmo.)		Mattia Crucioli	3,382	1.49	3,502	1.45	–
Alternative Left (Note: Unitary list between the PdCI, PRC, and SA.)		Antonella Marras	2,954	1.30	3,131	1.29	–
Sovereign Popular Democracy		Toscano Francesco	1,834	0.81	1,917	0.79	–
United Genoa		Raffaella Gualco	1,138	0.50	1,248	0.52	–
Workers' Communist Party		Cinzia Ronzitti	619	0.27	651	0.27	–
Total			226,997	100.00	242,260	100.00	40

===== Orero =====
Graph of the party split among 10 seats.
Candidate	Party	Votes	%	Seats
Rosa Cavagnaro	Living Orero	166	52.20	7
Carlo Guainazzo	Together for Orero	150	47.17	3
Dario Maccarone	Social Democracy Movement (Note: Candidates in this list are all non-residents of the municipality.)	1	0.31	–
Maria Remedios Bessi	Tricolour Flame	1	0.31	–
Nicola Errichiello	Popular Project	0	0.00	–
Total		318	100.00	10

===== Rossiglione =====
Graph of the party split among 9 seats.
Candidate	Party-list	Votes	%	Seats
Omar Peruzzo	Together to grow Rossiglione	1,139	100.00	9
Total		1,139	100.00	9

==== Province of Imperia ====
===== Vallecrosia =====
Graph of the party split among 12 seats.
Candidate	Party	Votes	%	Seats
Fabio Perri	Your Vallecrosia	1,561	52.56	8
Marilena Piraldi	Citizens in common	1,409	47.44	4
Total		2,970	100.00	12

==== Province of Savona ====
===== Sassello =====
Graph of the party split among 10 seats.
Candidate	Party-list	Votes	%	Seats
Gian Marco Scasso	New Way for Sassello	787	100.00	10
Total		787	100.00	10

=== Emilia-Romagna ===
==== Ravenna ====
2025 Ravenna municipal elections
- May 25, 2025-May 26, 2025
- Turnout: 49.55% (▼4.53%)
	Majority party	Minority party
Candidate	Alessandro Barattoni	Nicola Grandi
Party	Democratic Party	Brothers of Italy
Alliance	Centre-left	Centre-right (Note: Only FdI and FI with civic lists. Lega, PdF and other civic lists supported Alvaro Ancisi)
Seats before	22 / 32	7 / 32
Seats won	21 / 32	8 / 32
Seat change	▼1	▲1
Percentage	58.15%	25.05%
Swing	▼1.32%	▲2.59
Round 1	35,759	15,405
Mayor before election
Michele De Pascale
Democratic Party
Elected mayor
Alessandro Barattoni
Democratic Party

Graph of the party split among 30 seats.
Candidates	Votes	%	Lists	Votes	%	Seats
Alessandro Barattoni	35,759	58.15	Democratic Party	23,739	40	16
Alessandro Barattoni	35,759	58.15	Five Star Movement	2,627	4.43	1
Alessandro Barattoni	35,759	58.15	Greens and Left Alliance (Note: Includes candidates from Environment and Territory.)	2,578	4.34	1
Alessandro Barattoni	35,759	58.15	Italian Republican Party	2,508	4.23	1
Alessandro Barattoni	35,759	58.15	Love Ravenna	2,174	3.66	1
Alessandro Barattoni	35,759	58.15	Ravenna Project (Note: Including candidates from IV, Azione, PSI and +E)	1,441	2.43	1
Alessandro Barattoni	35,759	58.15	Total centre-left coalition:	35,067	59.08	21
Nicola Grandi	15,405	25.05	Brothers of Italy	9,958	16.78	5
Nicola Grandi	15,405	25.05	Forza Italia	2,845	4.79	1
Nicola Grandi	15,405	25.05	Ravenna Alive	1,688	2.84	1
Nicola Grandi	15,405	25.05	Coalition candidate's seat			1
Nicola Grandi	15,405	25.05	Total centre-right coalition (Grandi):	14,491	24.41	7
Alvaro Ancisi	3,976	6.47	League - The People of the Family - List for Ravenna - Ancisi Mayor	3,318	5.59	1
Alvaro Ancisi	3,976	6.47	Environment and Animals	492	0.83	—
Alvaro Ancisi	3,976	6.47	Coalition candidate's seat			1
Alvaro Ancisi	3,976	6.47	Total centre-right coalition (Ancisi):	3,810	6.42	2
Veronica Verlicchi	2,704	4.40	The Pine	2,579	4.35	—
Veronica Verlicchi	2,704	4.40	Civic list candidate's seat			1
Marisa Iannucci	1,859	3.02	Communist Refoundation Party	561	0.95	—
Marisa Iannucci	1,859	3.02	Power to the People!	414	0.70	—
Marisa Iannucci	1,859	3.02	Ravenna in Common	372	0.63	—
Marisa Iannucci	1,859	3.02	Italian Communist Party	287	0.48	—
Marisa Iannucci	1,859	3.02	Total left-wing coalition:	1,634	2.75	—
Maurizio Miserocchi	895	1.46	Ravenna in the Centre	892	1.50	—
Giovanni Morgese	893	1.45	Christian Democracy	881	1.48	—
Total:	61,491	100		59,354	100	32

=== Veneto ===
==== Metropolitan City of Venice ====
===== Santa Maria di Sala =====
2025 Santa Maria di Sala municipal election
- 25–26 May 2025
	Majority party	Minority party
Candidate	Alessadro Arpi	Nataschia Rocchi
Party	Independent	Forza Italia
Alliance	FdI - LSP - CI - IV (Note: In this election, the centre-right coalition split into a right-wing coalition and a more moderate centre-right. FdI, Lega, CI, IV and other civic lists back Alessandro Arpi, while Forza Italia and other civic lists back Nataschia Rocchi.)	FI - other civic lists
Last election	11 / 16	Did not exist
Seats won	10 / 16	4 / 16
Seat change	▼1	New
Swing	▼17.59%	▼40.16% (Note: Compared to Rocchi's previous result in 2022.)
Mayor before election
Paola de Palma
Elected mayor
Alessandro Arpi

Graph of the party split among 16 seats.
Candidates	Votes	%	Lists	Votes	%	Seats
Alessandro Arpi	4,016	52.18	Generations for Growing - Courage Italy	1,307	17.73	4
Alessandro Arpi	4,016	52.18	For Arpi Mayor - Venetian Independence	1,209	16.40	3
Alessandro Arpi	4,016	52.18	Brothers of Italy	909	12.32	2
Alessandro Arpi	4,016	52.18	League	502	6.81	1
Alessandro Arpi	4,016	52.18	Total right-wing coalition (Arpi):	3,927	53.26	10
Nataschia Rocchi	2,279	29.61	Forza Italia - Salese List	1,240	16.82	2
Nataschia Rocchi	2,279	29.61	Civic Alternative	511	6.93	1
Nataschia Rocchi	2,279	29.61	Common Renaissance Project	353	4.79	—
Nataschia Rocchi	2,279	29.61	Coalition candidate's seat			1
Nataschia Rocchi	2,279	29.61	Total centre-right coalition (Rocchia):	2,104	28.54	4
Massimo Iovine	1,401	18.2	Civics Together - Democratic Party - Five Star Movement - Green and Left Alliance	1,343	18.22	1
Massimo Iovine	1,401	18.2	Coalition candidate's seat			1
Massimo Iovine	1,401	18.2	Total centre-left coalition:	1,343	18.22	2
Total	7,696	100		7,374	100	16

== Provincial elections ==
=== Election of the Provincial Council ===
Provincial Council elections
Date	Province	Provincial Council				Notes
Date	Province	CDX	Centrists	CSX	Others	Notes
7 April	La Spezia	6	—	4	—	
27 April	Agrigento	5 (Note: 3 seats for DCS, 2 for FdI)	—	—	7 (Note: 3 seats each for the civic lists "Go Blues" (it: Forza Azzurri) and "United for Agrigento" and one seat for "Together for Agrigento")	
27 April	Caltanissetta	6 (Note: 4 seats for FI, 1 seat each for FdI and Lega)	—	3 (Note: All 3 seats for Alternative)	1 (Note: One seat for civic list "Civics for our Territory".)	
27 April	Enna	6 (Note: 2 seats for MpA, 1 seat each for FI, FdI, Lega and DCS)	—	4 (Note: 4 seats for PD-Alternativa)	—	
27 April	Ragusa	6 (Note: 3 seats for the civic list "Municipal Voice", 2 seats for FdI and one seat for FI)	3 (Note: All 3 seats for DCS)	3 (Note: 3 seats for PD-Alternative)	—	
27 April	Siracusa	4 (Note: 2 seats each for FdI and FI)	7 (Note: All 7 seats for the civic list "Municipalities at the Centre")	1 (Note: One seat for PD)	—	
27 April	Trapani	8 (Note: 2 seats each for FI, FdI, Lega and DCS)	—	4 (Note: All 4 seats for the civic list "Quinci for President")	—	

=== Election of the President of the Province ===
Legend
Prefectural Commissioner [it]
Centre-right coalition
Popular Alternative
Centre-left coalition
Civic lists affiliated with the Centre-right.
Others / Grand coalition

Elections of Provincial presidents
Date	Province	Incumbent president (Note: The Free Municipal Consortia have been governed since 15 August 2015 by an extraordinary commissioner appointed by the region DPR n.537/2015)	President elected	Note
3 March	Ravenna	Michele De Pascale	Valentina Palli	
30 March	Terni	Laura Pernazza	Stefano Bandecchi	
30 March	Perugia	Stefania Proietti	Massimiliano Presciutti	
6 April	Salerno	Franco Alfieri	Vincenzo Napoli	
27 April	Agrigento	Giovanni Bologna (Note: As extraordinary commissioner.)	Giuseppe Pendolino (Note: Grand Coalition composed of IV - MpA - FI - PD - M5S)	
27 April	Caltanissetta	Duilio Alongi	Walter Tesauro	
27 April	Enna	Girolamo Di Fazio	Piero Capizzi	
27 April	Ragusa	Patrizia Valenti	Maria Rita Schembari	
27 April	Syracuse	Domenico Percolla	Michelangelo Giansiracusa (Note: Coalition composed of Action - MpA - DC-S - Lega)	
27 April	Trapani	Maria Concetta Antinoro	Salvatore Quinci	
22 May	Taranto	Rinaldo Melucci	Gianfranco Palmisano	
27 June	Caserta	Giorgio Magliocca	Anacleto Colombiano	
14 September	Novara	Federico Binatti	Marco Caccia	
29 September	Gallura North-East Sardinia	Gaspare Piccinnu	Settimo Nizzi	
29 September	Medio Campidano	Roberto Cadeddu	Giuseppe De Fanti	
29 September	Nuoro	Giuseppe Ciccolini	Giuseppe Ciccolini	
29 September	Ogliastra	Marzia Mameli	Alessio Seoni	
29 September	Oristano	Battistino Ghisu	Paolo Pireddu	
29 September	Sulcis Iglesiente	Sergio Murgia	Mauro Usai	
18 December	Imperia	Claudio Scajola	Claudio Scajola	
20 December	Massa-Carrara	Gianni Lorenzetti	Roberto Valettini	
21 December	Verbano-Cusio-Ossola	Alessandro Lana	Giandomenico Albertella	
21 December	Viterbo	Alessandro Romoli	Alessandro Romoli	
21 December	L'Aquila	Angelo Caruso	Angelo Caruso	
21 December	Pavia	Giovanni Palli	Giovanni Palli	

Six Sicilian provinces were provisionally led from 15 August 2015 by an extraordinary commissioner via regional appointment and thus 27 April election was to elect a new provincial president.

==== Summary of elected Provincial presidents ====
Province Presidents
Coalition	Presidents	Change
Centre-left coalition	6 / 12	▲2
Centre-right coalition	2 / 12	▲1
Others	3 / 12	▲3
Popular Alternative	1 / 12	▲1

The Provincial presidents won by the centre-right, centre-left and others category include each two presidents elected in Sicily, previously governed as commissariats and therefore not bound to any coalition.

=== Metropolitan council elections ===
Date	Metropolitan cities	Metropolitan Mayor	Council Lists	Seats		Notes
27 April	Catania 18 seats	Enrico Trantino (FdI - CDX)	FdI	5	Graph of the party split among 18 seats.	
27 April	Catania 18 seats	Enrico Trantino (FdI - CDX)	FI	4	Graph of the party split among 18 seats.	
27 April	Catania 18 seats	Enrico Trantino (FdI - CDX)	League	3	Graph of the party split among 18 seats.	
27 April	Catania 18 seats	Enrico Trantino (FdI - CDX)	Grande Sicilia (Note: Includes candidates from UdC, MpA and any civic lists close to Roberto Lagalla.)	3	Graph of the party split among 18 seats.	
27 April	Catania 18 seats	Enrico Trantino (FdI - CDX)	PD - Alternativa (Note: Includes candidates from M5S, EV, SI and Contracorrente.)	2	Graph of the party split among 18 seats.	
27 April	Catania 18 seats	Enrico Trantino (FdI - CDX)	DC Sicilia	1	Graph of the party split among 18 seats.	
27 April	Messina 14 seats	Federico Basile (ScN)	ScN	4	Graph of the party split among 14 seats.	
27 April	Messina 14 seats	Federico Basile (ScN)	League	3	Graph of the party split among 14 seats.	
27 April	Messina 14 seats	Federico Basile (ScN)	FI	2	Graph of the party split among 14 seats.	
27 April	Messina 14 seats	Federico Basile (ScN)	FdI	2	Graph of the party split among 14 seats.	
27 April	Messina 14 seats	Federico Basile (ScN)	PD - Alternativa	2	Graph of the party split among 14 seats.	
27 April	Messina 14 seats	Federico Basile (ScN)	Grande Sicilia	1	Graph of the party split among 14 seats.	
27 April	Palermo 18 seats	Roberto Lagalla (UdC - CDX)	FI	5	Graph of the party split among 18 seats.	
27 April	Palermo 18 seats	Roberto Lagalla (UdC - CDX)	FdI	3	Graph of the party split among 18 seats.	
27 April	Palermo 18 seats	Roberto Lagalla (UdC - CDX)	DC Sicilia	3	Graph of the party split among 18 seats.	
27 April	Palermo 18 seats	Roberto Lagalla (UdC - CDX)	PD	3	Graph of the party split among 18 seats.	
27 April	Palermo 18 seats	Roberto Lagalla (UdC - CDX)	Alternativa	2	Graph of the party split among 18 seats.	
27 April	Palermo 18 seats	Roberto Lagalla (UdC - CDX)	Working for Palermo	1	Graph of the party split among 18 seats.	
27 April	Palermo 18 seats	Roberto Lagalla (UdC - CDX)	League	1	Graph of the party split among 18 seats.	

==== Summary of metropolitan councillors elected (in Sicily) ====
Coalition	Councillors	Change
Centre-right	78 / 128	▲72
Centre-left	28 / 128	▲24
Centrist	10 / 128	▲10
Civic Lists	8 / 128	▲8
South calls North	4 / 128	▲4

== Notes ==
Key:
Abbreviation	Party	
FdI	Brothers of Italy - Fratelli d'Italia	
League / Lega	League for Salvini Premier	
FI	Forza Italia	
DCS	Christian Democracy Sicily - Democrazia Cristiana Sicilia	
MpA	Movement for Autonomy - Movimento per l'Autonomia	
UDC	Union of Christian and Centre Democrats - L'Unione dei Democratici Cristiani e Democratici di Centro	
ScN	South Calls North - Sud Chiama Nord	
PD	Democratic Party - Partito Democratico	
DemoS	Solidary Democracy - Democrazia Solidale	
M5S	Five Star Movement - Movimento Cinque Stelle	
IV	Italia Viva - Italy Alive	
PdCI	Party of Italian Communists - Partito dei Comunisti Italiani	
PRC	Communist Refoundation Party - Partito della Rifondazione Comunista	
SA	Anticapitalist Left - Sinistra Anticapitalista	
PSI	Italian Socialist Party - Partito Socialista Italiano	
NPSI	New Italian Socialist Party - Nuovo Partito Socialista Italiano	
AVS	Greens and Left Alliance - Alleanza Verdi e Sinistra	
AVS	EV	Green Europe - Europa Verde
AVS	SI	Italian Left - Sinistra Italiana
+E	More Europe - Più Europa	
CA / CA.eu	Autonomy House - Casa Autonomia.eu	
