= Valerio Gildoni =

Italian military officer (1969–2009)

Valerio Gildoni (2 January 1969, in Sansepolcro – 17 July 2009, in Nanto) was an Italian military officer, colonel of the Carabinieri and a recipient of the gold medal of military valor.

== Biography ==
Son of Paola and Settimio (former Carabinieri marshal of Sansepolcro station), he entered the Nunziatella Military School of Naples (course 1984-1987 "Grifo") very young. Course companion of Antonio De Crescentiis and Ferdinando Scala, he was later admitted to the Academy of Modena with the 169th course "Orgoglio" (Pride), as an officer cadet of the Carabinieri.

Over the years, he has accumulated four degrees in law, political sciences, sociology and psychology.

During his career he was platoon commander at the Carabinieri Non-Commissioned Officers School in Florence, and later in command of the operational nucleus Milano Duomo and of the Carabinieri companies of Bressanone, Partinico and Roma Montesacro, dealing also with cases of media clamor, such as the death of Vanessa Russo. After a period of service at the Defence General Staff, he attended the course ISSMI (Istituto Superiore Stato Maggiore Interforze) at the "Istituto alti studi della difesa" (IASD).

In the evening of Friday, July 17, 2009, just five days after resuming service, he intervened in Bosco di Nanto (Vicenza) alongside his Carabinieri to bring to reason an eighty-four year old man that barricaded himself at home, armed with a rifle and in a state of mental imbalance. He is in charge of persuasion activities and tries to approach the door of the house unarmed in order to obtain the surrender of the old man, who, however, fires at him by hitting him on the head and killing him.

Set up the funeral chamber at the Chinotto barracks in Vicenza, the funerals are celebrated in a strictly private form in the church of San Domenico in Città di Castello by the military vicar Mons. Angelo Bassi together with Gildoni's priest brother, don Alberto. The body is buried in the cemetery of Città di Castello.

He was awarded the gold medal for military valour in memory by presidential decree of May 14, 2010. May 29, 2010 is named after him the seat of Legal Medicine of the San Bortolo Hospital in Vicenza. On April 26, 2011, the City Council of Città di Castello decided to dedicate a square in the city center to his memory. On July 17, 2011, the second anniversary of his death, the official ceremony of naming in his name the Loggiato ex Bufalini and the square in front of it is held. On May 11, 2013 the Carabinieri barracks of Thiene, in the Vicenza area, is named after him with a ceremony in the presence of the highest exponent of the Corp; a plaque in honor of Gildoni is placed at the entrance of the building.

On March 31, 2016, the President of the Italian Republic, Sergio Mattarella presided over the ceremony of naming the barracks of the headquarters of the Carabinieri Command Carabinieri Protection of Cultural Heritage to the memory of Valerio Gildoni. The ceremony was attended by the family of the deceased officer together with the Minister of Cultural Heritage and Tourism of the Italian Republic, Dario Franceschini and the General Commander of the Carabinieri Tullio Del Sette with the presence of the regional and provincial authorities.

He was married to seismologist and volcanologist Barbara Cantucci, but had no children; he was also second cousin on the mother's side of the famous Italian actress Monica Bellucci.

On July 17, 2019 is remembered the tenth anniversary of his death with a mass in the cathedral of Città di Castello.

== Awards ==
Gold medal for military valour
