= List of presidents of the Province of L'Aquila =

President of the Province of L'Aquila
- Presidente della Provincia dell'Aquila
- Incumbent; Angelo Caruso since 31 July 2017
- Term length: 4 years
- Formation: 1889

The president of the Province of L'Aquila is the head of the provincial government in L'Aquila, Abruzzo, Italy. The president oversees the administration of the province, coordinates the activities of the municipalities, and represents the province in regional and national matters.

Since July 2017, the office has been held by Angelo Caruso, a centre-right independent.

== List ==
=== Presidents of the Provincial Deputation (1889–1926) ===
No.	Portrait	Name	Term of office		Political party
No.	Portrait	Name	Took office	Left office	Political party
1		Michele Iacobucci	1889	1891	Historical Left
2		Antonio Cappelli	1891	1892	Historical Right
3		Antonio Ciolina	1892	1899	Historical Left
4		Giovanni Petrini	1899	1901	?
5		Panfilo Tedeschi	1901	1902	?
6		Mariano Iacobucci	1902	1908	?
7		Vincenzo Gentile	1908	1916 ?	?
		Cesidio De Vincentiis	1921	1926	Italian Radical Party; Social Democracy

=== Presidents of the Provincial Deputation (1944–1951) ===
No.	Portrait	Name	Term start	Term end	Party
1		Ermenegildo Tecca	?	1951	Christian Democracy

=== Presidents of the Province (1951–present) ===
No.	Portrait	Name	Term start	Term end	Party
1		Ermenegildo Tecca	1951	1956	Christian Democracy
2		Pasquale Santucci	1956	1970	Christian Democracy
3		Francesco Gaudieri	1970	1975	Christian Democracy
4		Serafino Petricone	1975	21 January 1986	Christian Democracy
5		Bruno Di Masci	21 January 1986	14 July 1990	Italian Socialist Party
6		Giorgio Castellani	14 July 1990	16 March 1993	Christian Democracy
7		Franco Di Giannantonio	16 March 1993	7 May 1995	Christian Democracy
8		Palmiero Susi	7 May 1995	28 June 1999	Italian People's Party; Forza Italia
8		Palmiero Susi	28 June 1999	28 June 2004	Italian People's Party; Forza Italia
9		Stefania Pezzopane	28 June 2004	30 March 2010	Democrats of the Left; Democratic Party
10		Antonio Del Corvo	30 March 2010	3 May 2015	The People of Freedom
11		Antonio De Crescentiis	3 May 2015	12 June 2017	Independent (centre-left)
–		Fabrizio D'Alessandro (acting)	12 June 2017	31 July 2017	Democratic Party
12		Angelo Caruso	31 July 2017	18 December 2021	Independent (centre-right)
12		Angelo Caruso	18 December 2021	21 December 2025	Independent (centre-right)
12		Angelo Caruso	21 December 2025	Incumbent	Independent (centre-right)

== Sources ==
- "Storia amministrativa dell'ente". Ministero dell'Interno.
- Menichini, Piera (2005). "I presidenti delle Province dall'Unità alla Grande guerra: repertorio analitico". Storia Amministrazione Costituzione (13): 255–256.
