= Fulvio Centoz =

Italian politician (born 1975)

Member of the Regional Council of Aosta Valley
- Incumbent
- Assumed office 28 October 2025

Mayor of Aosta
- In office 15 May 2015 – 6 October 2020
- Preceded by: Bruno Giordano
- Succeeded by: Gianni Nuti

Mayor of Rhêmes-Notre-Dame
- In office 24 May 2010 – 8 May 2015
- Preceded by: Donato Ronc
- Succeeded by: Corrado Oreiller

Personal details
- Born: 4 February 1975 (age 51) Aosta, Aosta Valley, Italy
- Party: Democratic Party
- Education: University of Pavia
- Profession: Politician

Fulvio Centoz (born 4 February 1975) is an Italian politician.

He is a member of the Democratic Party and he served as mayor in Rhêmes-Notre-Dame from 2010 to 2015. He was elected mayor of Aosta on 11 May 2015 and took office on 15 May.

In October 2025, he was elected to the Regional Council of Aosta Valley.

Political offices
Preceded by Bruno Giordano	Mayor of Aosta; 2015–2020	Succeeded by Gianni Nuti
