= Guido Grimod =

Italian politician (born 1951)

Mayor of Aosta
- In office 8 May 2000 – 24 May 2010
- Preceded by: Pier Luigi Thiébat
- Succeeded by: Bruno Giordano

Personal details
- Born: 13 February 1951 (age 75) Aosta, Italy
- Party: Valdostan Union
- Education: Université Savoie Mont Blanc
- Occupation: Employee, librarian

Guido Grimod (born 13 February 1951) is an Italian politician.

He is member of the Valdostan Union party and served as mayor of Aosta for two terms from May 2000 to May 2010.

== See also ==
- List of mayors of Aosta

Political offices
Preceded by Pier Luigi Thiébat	Mayor of Aosta; 2000 – 2010	Succeeded by Bruno Giordano
