= Giulio Fiou =

Italian politician (1938–2024)

Mayor of Aosta
- In office 23 June 1992 – 29 May 1995
- Preceded by: Leonardo La Torre
- Succeeded by: Pier Luigi Thiébat

Member of the Regional Council of Aosta Valley
- In office 30 June 1998 – 26 May 2008

Personal details
- Born: 17 May 1938 Aosta, Italy
- Died: 17 August 2024 (aged 86) Aosta, Italy
- Party: Italian Communist Party; Democratic Party of the Left; Democrats of the Left
- Occupation: Teacher

Giulio Fiou (17 May 1938 – 17 August 2024) was an Italian politician.

== Life and career ==
Fiou served as mayor of Aosta as a member of the Democratic Party of the Left from June 1992 to May 1995. Fiou was also elected to the Regional Council of Aosta Valley in the XII and XI legislatures from 1998 to 2003 and 2003 until 2008.

Fiou died in Aosta on 17 August 2024, at the age of 86.

== See also ==
- List of mayors of Aosta

Political offices
Preceded by Leonardo La Torre	Mayor of Aosta; 23 June 1992 – 29 May 1995	Succeeded by Pier Luigi Thiébat
