= List of mayors of Aosta =

Mayor of Aosta
- Italian: Sindaco di Aosta; French: Syndic d'Aoste

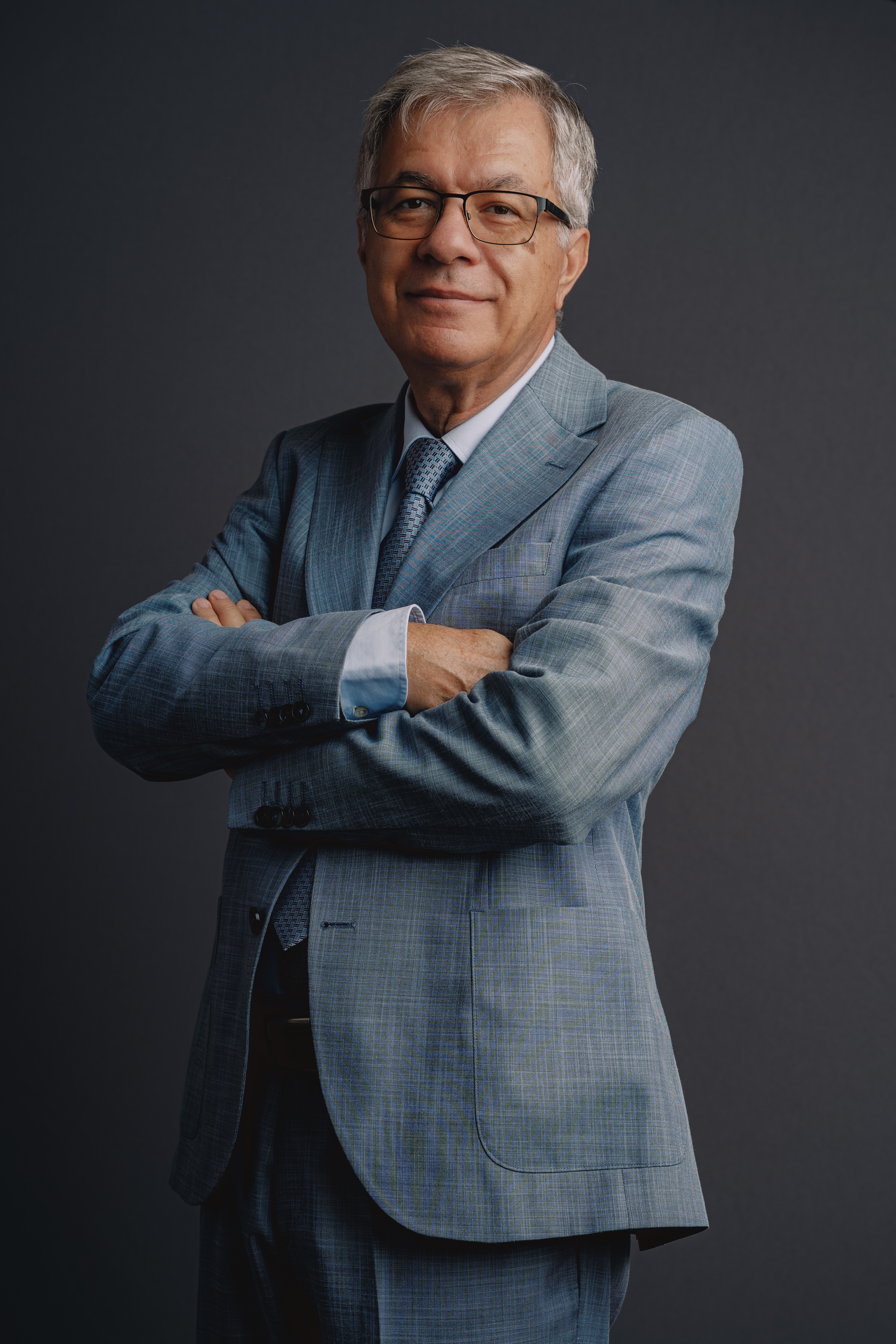
- Incumbent; Raffaele Rocco since 15 October 2025
- Appointer: Popular election
- Term length: 5 years, renewable once
- Website: Official website

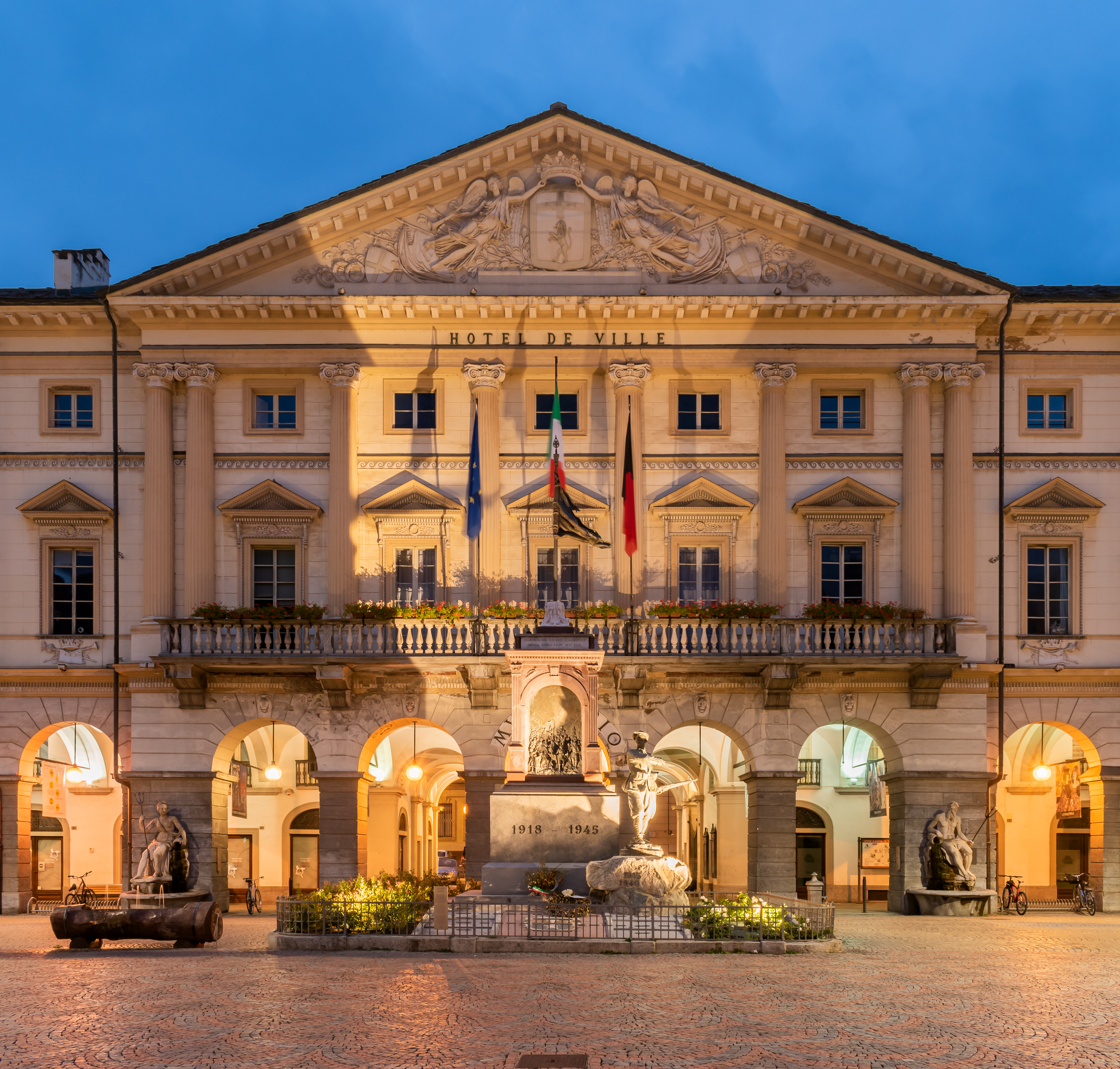
Aosta Town Hall.

The mayor of Aosta/Aoste is an elected politician who, along with the Aosta's city council, is accountable for the strategic government of Aosta, the regional capital of Aosta Valley, Italy.

The current mayor is Raffaele Rocco, a centre-left independent, who took office on 15 October 2025.

== Overview ==
According to the Italian Constitution, the mayor of Aosta is member of the city council.

The mayor is elected by the population of Aosta, who also elect the members of the city council, controlling the mayor's policy guidelines and is able to enforce his resignation by a motion of no confidence. The mayor is entitled to appoint and release the members of his government.

Since 1995 the mayor is elected directly by Aosta's electorate: in all mayoral elections in Italy in cities with a population higher than 15,000 the voters express a direct choice for the mayor or an indirect choice voting for the party of the candidate's coalition. If no candidate receives at least 50% of votes, the top two candidates go to a second round after two weeks. The election of the City Council is based on a direct choice for the candidate with a preference vote: the candidate with the majority of the preferences is elected. The number of the seats for each party is determined proportionally.

== Duchy of Savoy (until 1416) ==
List

- 1333 - Léonard de Villa - Viorin Boverie - Gilles de Chevrères - Brunet du Fosse - Vuillerme Tropel
- 1351 - Henry d'Oscano et Jean Valcarier (Mauconseil) - Raymond Jéremie et Jean Bergerii (De bicheria) - Hugonet de Arlio et Jean Avilié (De Porta Sancti Ursi)
- 1353 - Pierre Rulliardy - Jean Pollet - Jean de Rovereto (De Bicheria)
- 1356 - Bertrand de Gotorosi et Antoine de Pallen (De Bicheria) - Hugonet De Arlio et Bernard Pociolaz (Mauconseil) - Pierre de Palatio et Pierre Gonteret (De Porta Sancti Ursi)
- 1360 - Hugonet De Arlio
- 1401 - Jean Mayneti - Jean Malluquin

== Kingdom of Sardinia (1416–1860) ==
List

- 1428 - Urbain de Léaval
- 1436 - Claude Vaudan - Georges Taridan
- 1439 - Hugonet de La Tour - Martin Pignet
- 1443 - Scano De Pallen - Antoine Bérard
- 1457 - François Rulliardy - Jean de Reymondis
- 1460 - Boniface de La Tour - Jean Verchy
- 1467 - Jean Tharida - Barthélemy Ducis
- 1471 - Jean Meynet - Jean de Roveria
- 1472 - Pierre Dubois - Pierre de Rovarey
- 1481 - Guillaume Dubois - Jean de Horto
- 1487 - Louis Saluard - Boson Laurensety
- 1503 - Jean Alexonc - Jean Béatrice
- 1505-1506 - Boniface de Tollen - Jean de Marcenasq
- 1512 - Jean Pensa - Jacques Mugnery - Jean Ottin
- 1513 - Jean Chamin - Jacques Mugnéry
- 1514-1515 - Claude Mistralis - Marcel du Prez
- 1516 - Jacques Bernardi - Jean Cathérelly
- 1528 - Nicolas-François Guichardy - Jean de Près
- 1529 - Jean Saluard - Jean Ottin
- 1530 - François Jacquemody - Jean Gueuillardy
- 1531 - Antoine de Bosses - Antoine de Pré
- 1532 - Pierre Fabri - Antoine Bufantan
- 1533 - François la Crête - Antoine Caterel
- 1534 - Denys Arragonis - Jean de Canaly
- 1535 - Jean Martinet - Jean Maguet
- 1536 - Pantaléon Ottini - Pantaléon Berthody
- 1537 - Jean-François Vaudan - Jean Bianquin
- 1538 - Jean-Francois Beillety - Jean Galli
- 1539 - Michel Saluard - Sulpice Milliéry
- 1540 - Antoine Vaudan - Jean Passerin
- 1541 - Barthélemy Lachériety - François Bianquin
- 1542 - Antoine De Bertharinis - Claude Bocheti
- 1543 - Jean de Pensa - Humbert Catherel
- 1544 - Jean de Rou - Antoine Vaudan
- 1545 - Michel Guichardy - Pierre Puppon
- 1546 - Barthélemy de Carreria - Pantaléon Camin
- 1547 - Pantaléon Pépolin - Grat Berthui
- 1549 - François Bornyon - François Gilliet
- 1550 - René Lostan - Sulpice Gorra
- 1551 - Nicolas Bandelli - Pantaléon Clauselina
- 1552 - Jean Quey - Pierre Gerliery
- 1553 - Pierre de Berthaz - Jean André
- 1554 - Pantaléon Vaudan - Jean Saluard
- 1555 - Jean Malliet - Grat Duc
- 1556 - Claude Excoffieri - Rou Goillard
- 1557-1559 - Nicolas d'Avise - Claude Saluard
- 1560-1561 - Bonaventure Vaudan - Pierre Foldon
- 1562 - Jean Tillier - Martin Nigri
- 1563 - André Fuaz - Étienne Sourelley
- 1564 - Jean Cerise - Sulpice Martinet
- 1565 - Pierre Roncassi - Nicolas Menet Saluard
- 1566 - Jean-Martin Fuaz - Antoine Meynet
- 1567 - Leonard des Bosses - Hyblet Foldon
- 1568 - Pierre Saluard - Sébastien Sattenin
- 1569 - Jean-Boniface Malliet - Barthélemy de Pré
- 1570 - François la Grive - Étienne Batiany
- 1571 - Claude Quay - Guillaume Jacquenin
- 1572 - Mathieu Pensa - Guillaume Jacquenin - Jean Savini
- 1573 - Bening La Chériety - Antoine Gal
- 1574 - Antoine Bérard - Martin Bazelly
- 1575 - François Poncet - Jean Pessin
- 1576 - Sulpice Varineis - Jean de Pré
- 1577 - Antoine-Philibert Regis - Ayme André
- 1578 - Thibaud de Valette - Barthélemy Clavel
- 1579 - Mathieu Defeyes - Jean Ravet
- 1580-1581 - Marcel Sebrié - Vincent Ottiné
- 1582 - Hilaire Pointiers - Louis Bianquin
- 1583 - Bonaventure-Philibert Bournyon - Pierre Chanvillair
- 1584 - Grat Philippon - Eusèbe Munier
- 1585 - Grat Philippon - Nicolas Peclet
- 1586 - Pierre Saluard - Jean-Pantaléon Bussautan
- 1587 - Nicolas Tillier - Étienne Favre
- 1588 - François Aymonety - Léger Milliéry
- 1589 - Grat Bertharin - Louis Avoiat
- 1590 - Étienne Pépelin - Jean Milliet - Pantaléon Malliet
- 1591 - Jean-Antoine la Crête - Vincent Jeantet - Antoine Foldon
- 1592 - Philippe Cerise - Jean-Barthélemy Saluard
- 1593 - Claude Dunoyer - Pantaléon Cantamot
- 1594 - Antoine Bérardy - Jean Malliet
- 1595 - Marc Carlin - Claude Poignendy
- 1596 - Pantaléon la Chériète - Jean-Antoine Gorra
- 1597-1598 - François Carabel - Jean Grimod
- 1599 - Jean-Jacques Malliet - Nicolas Saluard
- 1600 - Rolland Giavin - Antoine Gilliet
- 1601 - Jacques Bérard - Michel De Vevey
- 1602 - Pantaléon Buthod - Barthélemy Pasteur
- 1603 - Philibert Saluard - Jean-Guillaume Martinet
- 1604 - Philibert Saluard - Pierre Chanvillair
- 1605 - Jean-François Cuchat - François Cornillon La Valleta
- 1606 - André Marcoz - Pierre Marcoz
- 1607 - Jean Remondé - Jean-Barthélemy Martinet
- 1608 - Jean-Pierre Jeantet - Barthélemy Pomat
- 1609 - Vincent la Cheriette - François Chanvillair
- 1610 - Vincent la Cheriette - Jules-Phèbe Gilliet
- 1611 - Barthélemy Vignettaz - Michel de Collin
- 1612-1613 - André Savin - Sulpice Derriard
- 1614 - Jean-François Tillier - Jean-Jacques Passerin
- 1615 - Claude Gaberand - Étienne Dossan
- 1616 - Jean-François Decré - Étienne Dossan
- 1617 - Philibert Giavin - Laurent Favale
- 1618 - Georges de Grandes - Jean-François Lostan - Jean-Antoine Gal
- 1619-1620 - Jean-François Lostan - Jean-Antoine Gal
- 1621-1623 - Nicolas Besenval - Guillaume Mochety
- 1624 - Pierre Savin - André Bianquin
- 1625-1627 - Jean-Balthasard Pascal - François Poignendy
- 1628 - Jean-Nicolas Désaymonet - Gennin Lantamot
- 1629 - Jean Milliet - Étienne-Philibert Dunoyer
- 1630 - Jean Milliet - Pierre Blanc - Nicolas Bovety - Étienne-Philibert Dunoyer
- 1631 - Nicolas Bovety - Étienne-Philibert Dunoyer
- 1632 - Jean-Antoine Jeantet - Jean-Jacques De Pléoz
- 1633-1634 - Hugonet Derivoz - Jean-Jacques De Pléoz
- 1635 - Pierre Cossard - Jacquemet Fleur
- 1636 - Pantaléon Buthier - Antoine du Vevey
- 1637 - Louis Pomat - Antoine Charvoz
- 1638 - Laurent Vuillet - Antoine Gal
- 1639 - Jean-Vincent la Chériette - Jean-François Passerin
- 1640-1641 - Philibert Aymonier - Antoine Martini
- 1642 - Jean-Baptiste Bertoz - Antoine Martini
- 1643 - Mathieu Decré - Jean-Claude Mochety
- 1644-1645 - Mathieu Decré - Claude-François Bettety
- 1646 - Barthélemy Gogioz - Grat-Philippe Gaberand
- 1647 - Grat-Philippe Gaberand - Jean Bétemps
- 1648 - Jean Passerin - Jean Parise - Nicolas-Gaspard Peclet
- 1649 - Jean Parise - Antoine des Chenaux
- 1650 - Vuillen Tissioret - Claude Martini
- 1651 - Marc-Antoine Decré - Michel Martinet
- 1652 - Sulpice Derriard - Jean-Pierre Pontey
- 1653 - Jean-Antoine Ducloz - Jean-Pierre Pontey
- 1654 - Jean-Antoine Ducloz - Claude Pomat
- 1655 - Érasme Passan - Martin Vuillen
- 1656 - Claude Mollier - Martin Vuillen
- 1657 - Claude Mollier - Jean-Claude Peclet
- 1658-1660 - Jean-Boniface Festaz - Jean Camos
- 1661-1662 - Pierre Passerin - Jean-Baptiste Galeux
- 1663 - Mathieu Viettes - Louis Réan
- 1664-1665 - Cyprien Pascal - Nicolas Revel
- 1666-1667 - Grat Meilleur - Philibert-Amé Arnod
- 1668-1669 - Jean-Balthasard La Crête - Francois-Jérôme Francon
- 1670-1671 - Jean-Gaspard Bolossier - Pierre Viérin
- 1672 - Antoine Petitjacques - Pantaléon des Chenaux
- 1673-1675 - Germain Jourdan - Jean-Pierre Buillet
- 1676-1677 - Jean-Michel Passerin - Jean-Louis Passerin
- 1678 - Germain Diémoz - Jean-Joseph Lyboz
- 1679-1681 - Jean-Claude Pascal - Claude-Anselme Dunoyer
- 1682 - Jean-Pantaléon Valettaz - Martin Gonraz
- 1683 - Érasme-Nicolas Viettes - Martin Gonraz
- 1684-1686 - Jean-Baptiste Figerod - Aymé Hugonin
- 1687 - Jean Bus - Humbert Peclet - Pierre Viérin
- 1688 - Jean Bus - Pierre Viérin
- 1689 - Jean Bus - Pantaléon Noir
- 1690 - François Gogioz - Pantaléon Noir
- 1691 - Jean-André Curard - Jean-Pantaléon Noir
- 1692 - Jean-Antoine Millet - Jean-Rhémy Tillier
- 1693-1694 - Jean-Antoine Michelet - Jean-Rhémy Tillier
- 1695 - Jean-Jacques Ducloz - Jean Porliod
- 1696-1698 - Jean-Antoine Blanc - Jean-Georges Pépelin
- 1699 - Barthélemy Ubertin - Jean-Antoine Perlaz
- 1700 - Barthélemy Ubertin - Jean-Louis Perinod - Jean-Antoine Perlaz
- 1701 - Jean-Louis Périnod - Jean-Antoine Perlaz
- 1702 - Jean-Christophe Bertaz - Jean-Baptiste Vercellin
- 1703 - Jacques Bioley - Jean-Baptiste Vercellin
- 1704 - Jean-André Milet - Jean-François Droz
- 1705-1706 - Jean-Pantaléon Vivier - Jean-François Droz
- 1707 - Jean-Pierre Empereur - Jean-Dominique Biancoz
- 1708 - Jean-Joconde Rotaz - Jean-Dominique Biancoz
- 1709 - Pierre-Joseph Droz - Charles-Emmanuel Rovéyaz
- 1710 - Nicolas Bufloz - Charles-Emmanuel Rovéyaz
- 1711 - Jean-Pierre Burgay - Charles-Emmanuel Roveyaz
- 1712-1713 - François-Joseph Passerin - François-Antoine Passerin d'Entrèves
- 1714 - François-Joseph Passerin - Claude-Anselme Dunoyer
- 1715 - Hiacinte Milloz - Jean-Joseph Zaganaz
- 1716-1718 - Jean-Maurice Gérard - Philippe Réan
- 1719 - Jacques Ubertin - André Dartaz
- 1720 - Octave Cossard - Michel-Joseph Derriard
- 1721-1722 - Blaise-Joseph Festaz
- 1723-1724 - Jean-Grat Usel - Jean-Barthélemy Varisel
- 1725 - Jean-Jacques Squinabol - Jean-Barthélemy Varisel
- 1726-1728 - Claude Blanc - Jean-Léonard Vevey
- 1729-1731 - Jean-André Carrel - Guillaume Tillier
- 1732 - Pierre Savin - Jean-Jacques Bioley
- 1733 - Jean-Antoine Gippaz - Étienne Varisel
- 1734-1735 - Léonard Favre - Blaise-Hiacinte Derriard
- 1736 - Jean-Jacques Thédy - Marc-Antoine Ducrue - Blaise-Hiacinte Derriard
- 1737 - Nicolas-Pierre Pussod - Jean-Pantaléon Perret
- 1738 - Grat-Joseph Figerod - Jean-Pantaléon Perret
- 1739 - Jean-Pierre Favre - Jean-Pantaléon Perret
- 1740-1741 - Jean-Pierre Favre - Léonard Ansermin
- 1742 - Jean-François Derriard - Léonard Ansermin
- 1743 - Joseph-Nicolas Freydoz - Jean-Louis de Tillier
- 1744-1745 - Jean-Baptiste Davite - Jean-Baptiste Réan
- 1746-1748 - François-Léonard Millet - Jean-François Diernat
- 1749-1751 - Albert Bus-Droz
- 1752-1753 - Jean-Pierre Bois - André Grivon
- 1754 - Jean-Pierre Bois - Blaise-Maurice Tercinod
- 1755 - Maxime Pascaz - Blaise-Maurice Tercinod
- 1756 - Louis-César Forré - Blaise-Maurice Tercinod
- 1757-1758 - Louis-César Forré - Mathieu Vacher
- 1759 - Antoine-Sulpice Savin - Mathieu Vacher
- 1760-1761 - Antoine-Sulpice Savin - Elzéard Arnod
- 1762 - Elzéard Passerin - Elzéard Arnod
- 1763-1764 - Elzéard Passerin - Jean-Baptiste Jans
- 1765 - Louis Sariod de la Tour de Bard - Jean-Baptiste Jans
- 1766-1767 - Louis Sariod de la Tour de Bard - Jean-François Passerin d'Entrèves
- 1768 - Joseph Contoz - Jean-Jacques Charles
- 1769-1770 - Joseph Savoye - Jean-Jacques Charles
- 1771-1773 - Jean-Joseph de Nicolas - Jean-Jacques Rolland
- 1774 - Claude-Michel Barillier - Guillaume Champion
- 1775 - Grat-Joseph Cocoz - Guillaume Champion
- 1776 - Pierre-Joseph Ansermin - Guillaume Champion
- 1777 - François-Louis Sariod de la Tour de Bard - Jérôme Dhesia Ducretton
- 1778 - Comte de Bard - Grivon
- 1779 - Pierre-Joseph Ansermin - Jean-Jacques Charles
- 1780 - Comte de Bard - Arbaney
- 1781 - Joseph Savoye - Guillaume Champion
- 1782-1783 - D'Avise - Rebogliatti
- 1784 - Passerin d'Escalier - Francois Gay
- 1785 - Comte de Bard - Pierre-Antoine Pesse
- 1786 - Comte de Bard - Maurice Revillod
- 1787 - Pierre-Joseph Ansermin - Étienne-Joseph Rotaz
- 1788 - Jean-Baptiste Jans - Jean-Joseph Troc
- 1789 - Jacques Rolland - Joseph Savoye
- 1790 - Baron de Charvensod - Guillaume Champion
- 1791 - Jean-Léger Bianquin - Tillier
- 1792 - Bianquin - Maurice Revillod
- 1793 - Pierre-Joseph Ansermin - Jean-Laurent Tercinod
- 1794 - Jacques Rolland - Ruffier
- 1795 - Jean-Baptste Jans - Laurent Jean
- 1796 - Gerbore - Maurice Revillod
- 1797 - Baron de Charvensod - Jean-Laurent Tercinod
- 1798 - Cantaz - Jean-Baltasar Droz
- 1802-1807 - Maurice Revillod
- 1808 - Cerise - Jean-Baptiste Réan
- 1809-1810 - Jean-Baptiste Réan
- 1811-1812 - Cerise
- 1813 - Maurice Revillod
- 1814 - Louis-Antoine Sariod de la Tour - Jean-Laurent Tercinod
- 1815 - Louis-Antoine Sariod de la Tour - Comte de Brissogne
- 1816 - Comte de Brissogne - Cognein
- 1817 - Jean-Laurent Rebogliatti - Barrillier
- 1818 - Claude-François Regis - Pierre-Antoine Pesse
- 1819 - Comte de Brissogne - Droz
- 1820 - Alby - Pignet
- 1821 - Louis de La Tour - Jérôme Savin
- 1822 - Jean-Baptiste Réan - Thomas Villot
- 1823 - Claude-François Regis - Barmettes
- 1824 - Jean-Léger Tercinod - Léandre Galeazzo
- 1825 - Vassal - Pierre-Antoine Pesse
- 1826 - Empereur - Jérôme Savin
- 1827 - De La Pierre - Laurent Derriard
- 1828 - Louis de La Tour - Fraucey
- 1829 - Chevalier - Pierre-Antoine Pesse
- 1830 - Joseph-Octave Donnet - Joseph Gerbore
- 1831 - Augustin Vagneur - Maurice Tercinod
- 1832 - Defey - Barmettes
- 1833 - Boggioz - Léandre Galeazzo
- 1834 - Louis de La Tour - Augustin Derriard
- 1835 - Augustin Vagneur - Jean-Joseph Pesse
- 1836-1837 - Jean-Octave Donnet - Maurice Tercinod
- 1838-1839 - Emmanuel Bich - Laurent Argentier
- 1840-1841 - Emmanuel Bich
- 1842-1844 - Octave-Joseph Donnet
- 1845-1846 - Emmanuel Bich
- 1847-1848 - Maurice Tercinod
- 1849 - Ambroise Vallier
- 1850-1851 - Laurent Carlon
- 1852-1860 - Bruno Favre

== Kingdom of Italy (1861–1946) ==
List

- 1861-1863 - Bruno Favre
- 1864-1867 - Rémy Chevalier
- 1868 - interrègne
- 1869-1872 - Joseph Dalbard
- 1873 - interrègne
- 1874 - Victor Rosset
- 1875-1876 - Laurent Carlon
- 1877-1880 - Jules Martinet
- 1881-1882 - Vincent Berguet
- 1883 - interrègne
- 1884-1885 - Vincent Berguet
- 1888-1894 - Édouard Erba
- 1896-1903 - César Chabloz
- 1903 - François Pignet
- 1903 - Alessandro Pinelli
- 1903-1914 - Julien Charrey
- 1914-1917 - Desiré Norat
- 1917-1919 - Jean-Joconde Stévenin
- 1919-1923 - Jean Farinet
- 1923 - Alfredo Bonomo di Castania
- 1923 - Mario Trinchero
- 1926-1928 - Giuseppe Cajo
- 1928-1933 - Giuseppe Fusinaz
- 1933-1939 - Giulio Ettore Marcoz
- 1939-1943 - Luigi Ramallini
- 1943-1944 - Arnaldo Sertoli
- 1945-1946 - Carlo Torrione

== Italian Republic (since 1946) ==
=== City Council election (1946-1995) ===
From 1946 to 1995, the Mayor of Aosta was elected by the City Council.

	Mayor	Term start	Term end	Party
1	Fabiano Savioz	1946	1954	PCI
2	Giulio Dolchi	1954	1966	PCI
3	Giorgio Chanu	1966	1970	DC
4	Giovanni Bondaz	1970	1970	DC
5	Oreste Marcoz	1970	1971	UV
6	Roberto De Vecchi	1972	1975	PD
7	Gianni Torrione	1975	1975	PSI
8	Oddone Bongiovanni	1975	1978	PCI
9	Edoardo Bich	1978	1988	PSI
10	Francesco Allera Longo	1988	1989	PSI
11	Leonardo La Torre	1989	1992	PSI
12	Giulio Fiou	1992	1995	PDS

=== Direct election (since 1995) ===
Since 1995, under provisions of new local administration law, the Mayor of Aosta is chosen by direct election.

	Mayor	Term start	Term end	Party	Coalition	Election
13	Pier Luigi Thiébat	29 May 1995	8 May 2000	UV	UV • PDS • FA	1995
14	Guido Grimod	8 May 2000	9 May 2005	UV	UV • DS • SA	2000
14	Guido Grimod	9 May 2005	24 May 2010	UV	UV • DS • SA • FA	2005
15	Bruno Giordano	24 May 2010	15 May 2015	UV	UV • SA • FA • PdL	2010
16	Fulvio Centoz	15 May 2015	6 October 2020	PD	PD • UV • SA	2015
17	Gianni Nuti	6 October 2020 (Note: Election originally scheduled for May 2020 then postponed due to the COVID-19 pandemic.)	15 October 2025	Ind	PD • EV • UV	2020
18	Raffaele Rocco	15 October 2025	Incumbent	Ind	UV • PD • SA • RV • PlA	2025

== Bibliography ==
- Omezzoli, Tullio (2004). Il comune di Aosta. Figure, istituzioni, eventi in sei secoli di storia. Aosta: Le Château.
