= Diego Sozzani =

Italian politician (born 1960)

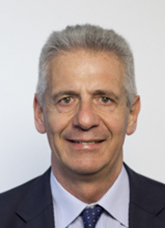

Member of the Chamber of Deputies
- In office 23 March 2018 – 12 October 2022
- Constituency: Piedmont 2

Member of the Regional Council of Piedmont
- In office 30 June 2014 – 10 April 2018

President of the Province of Novara
- In office 8 June 2009 – 11 July 2014
- Preceded by: Sergio Vedovato
- Succeeded by: Matteo Besozzi

Personal details
- Born: 2 October 1960 (age 66) Novara, Italy
- Party: The People of Freedom; Forza Italia
- Education: Polytechnic University of Turin
- Occupation: Civil engineer

Diego Sozzani (born 2 October 1960) is an Italian politician and civil engineer. A member of Forza Italia, he served as president of the Province of Novara from 2009 to 2014, as a member of the Regional Council of Piedmont from 2014 to 2018, and as a member of the Chamber of Deputies from 2018 to 2022.
