= Raffaele Rocco =

Italian politician

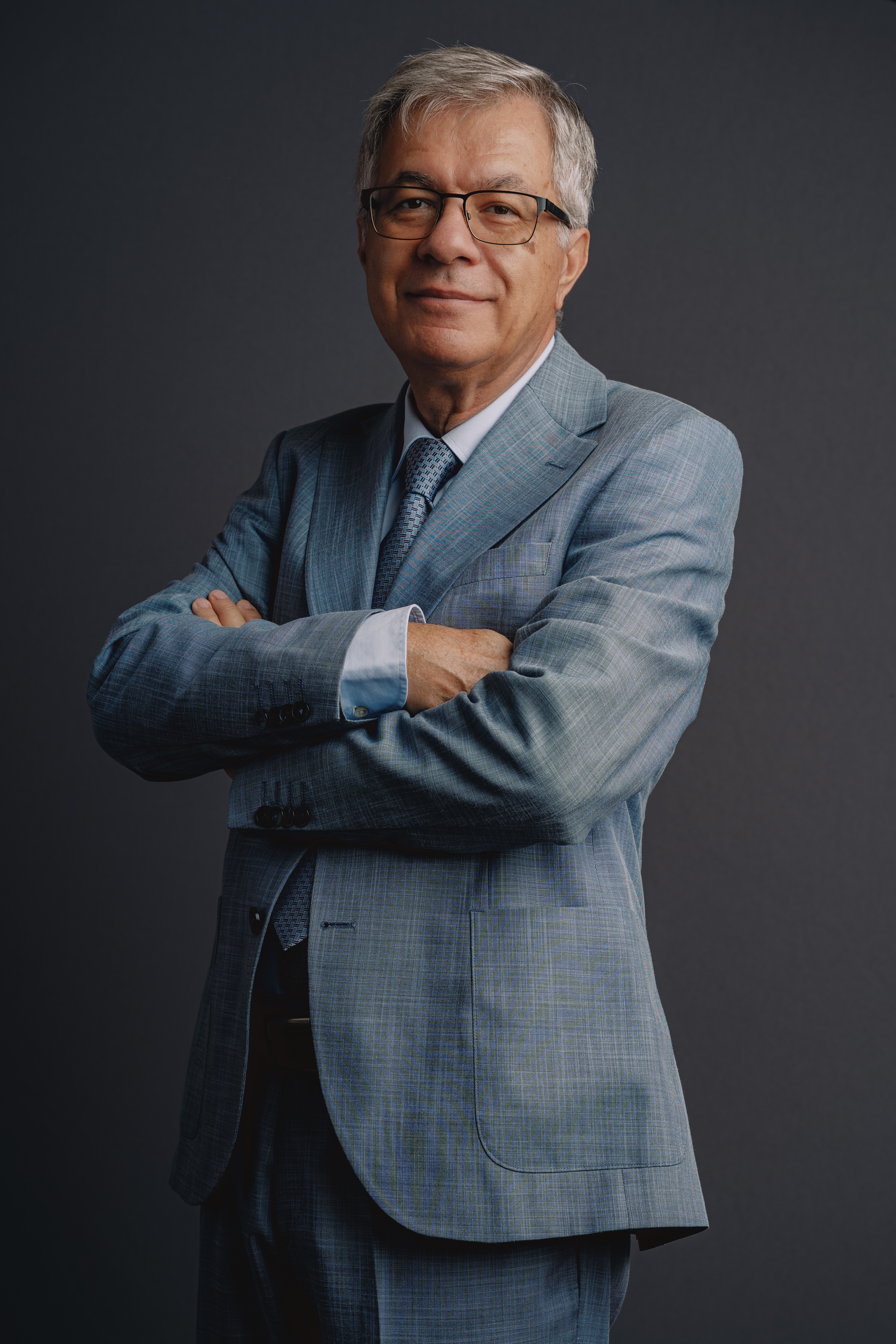

Mayor of Aosta
- Incumbent
- Assumed office 15 October 2025
- Preceded by: Gianni Nuti

Personal details
- Born: 31 May 1962 (age 64) Bologna, Italy
- Party: Independent (centre-left)
- Education: Polytechnic University of Turin
- Profession: Engineer, civil servant

Raffaele Rocco (born 31 May 1962) is an Italian engineer and politician, mayor of Aosta since 2025.

== Biography ==
Having graduated in Nuclear engineering from the Polytechnic University of Turin in 1988, Rocco obtained his license to practice engineering that same year, subsequently spending two years teaching scientific subjects in high schools.

In 1990, Rocco began his career in the Aosta Valley autonomous region, managing, directing, and coordinating land and water resource protection projects. He continued this work until the eve of his candidacy for mayor, becoming over the years a sector manager and expert in environmental issues.

=== Mayor of Aosta ===
In the 2025 local elections, Rocco became the official candidate of the center-left coalition for mayor of Aosta, supported by the Valdostan Union, the Democratic Party, the Edelweiss, and the For Autonomy movement. In the first round he came in first place with 45.29% of the votes, while in the second round he was elected mayor with 6,420 votes, 15 more than his center-right opponent Giovanni Girardini.

Political offices
Preceded by Gianni Nuti	Mayor of Aosta since 2025	Incumbent
