= Castel di Sangro =

Castel di Sangro Caštiéllë (Neapolitan)
- Comune
- Comune di Castel di Sangro
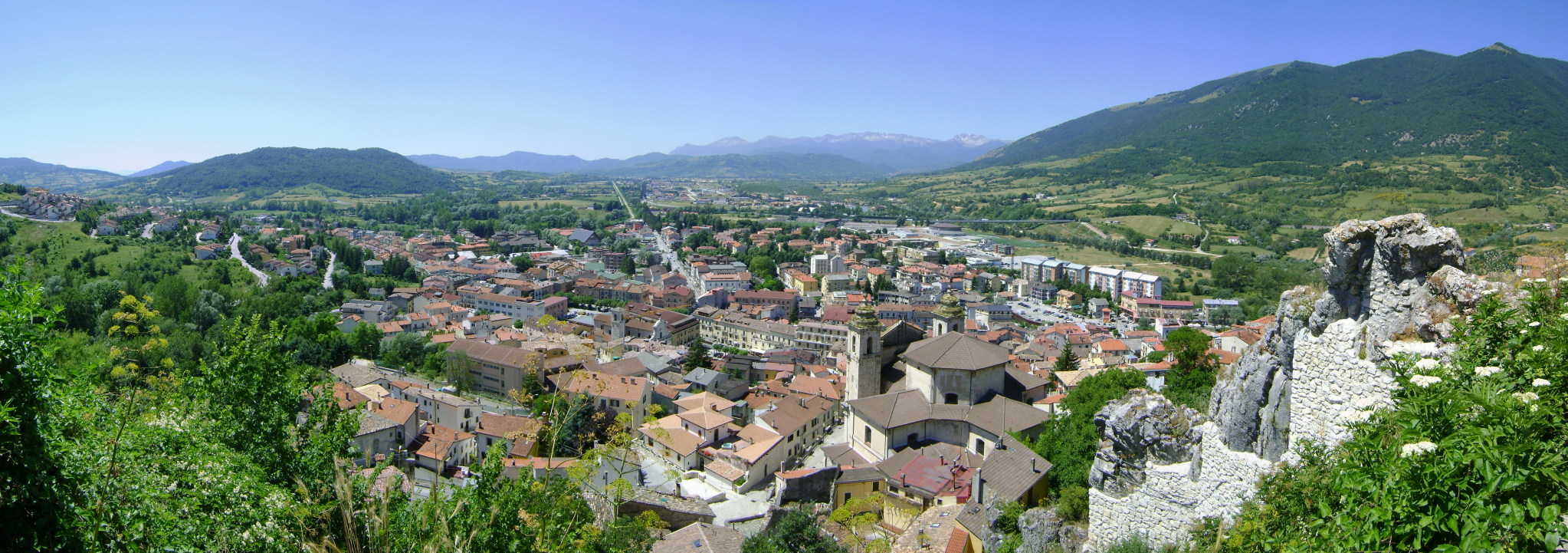
- Valley of Castel di Sangro

- Location within Italy Location within Abruzzo
- Coordinates: 41°47′00″N 14°6′00″E
- Country: Italy
- Region: Abruzzo
- Province: L'Aquila (AQ)
- Frazioni: Roccacinquemiglia, Località Pontone, Località Sant'Angelo, Torre di Feudozzo

Government
  - Mayor: Angelo Caruso

Area
  - Total: 83.98 km^{2} (32.42 sq mi)
- Elevation: 805 m (2,641 ft)

Population (2013)
  - Total: 6,461
  - Density: 76.93/km^{2} (199.3/sq mi)
- Demonym: Castellani
- Time zone: UTC+1 (CET)
  - Summer (DST): UTC+2 (CEST)
- Postal code: 67031
- Dialing code: 0864
- Patron saint: San Rufo
- Saint day: 27 August
- Website: Official website

Castel di Sangro (locally Caštiéllë) is a city and comune of 6,461 people (as of 2013) in the province of L'Aquila, in Abruzzo, central Italy. It is the main city of the Alto Sangro e Altopiano delle Cinque Miglia area.

== Geography ==
Castel di Sangro is located near the Sangro River, in a valley in the Apennine Mountains.

Neighbouring towns include Roccaraso, Pescocostanzo, Rivisondoli, San Pietro Avellana and Montenero Val Cocchiara.

== History ==
Castel di Sangro was known to the Romans as Aufidena (a city of the Samnites). It is the ancestral home of the third and last line of the House of Caesar (Catulus Caesar).

In the Second World War, the city was liberated by the West Nova Scotia Regiment of the First Canadian Division in November 1943. The regiment launched a night attack against the hilltop monastery which overlooks the city on November 22 but had to withdraw after suffering heavy losses from machine gun positions of the 3rd Battalion of the German 1st Parachute Regiment. The Canadians attacked a second time on November 24 supported by a heavy artillery bombardment which forced the Germans to withdraw, allowing the regiment to occupy the monastery without losses bringing Castel di Sangro and the south bank of the Sangro River into Allied hands.

== Main sights ==
- Basilica di Santa Maria Assunta
- Museo civico aufidenate

== Sport ==
The town gained some popularity in the mid-1990s thanks to the exploits of local football club Castel di Sangro Calcio In 1996, Castel di Sangro was visited by American author Joe McGinniss who wrote The Miracle of Castel di Sangro, a book about the team that made it up through 5 leagues to get to Serie B, the second-highest league in Italian football. The club now plays at Abruzzo's Promozione level, five levels below Serie B.

== Districts ==
Castel di Sangro is divided into six districts:

- Civita
- Stazione
- Colle
- Codacchiola
- Ara
- Piazza

== Transportation ==
Castel di Sangro has for years been a transit point for many people, because of its location making it the gateway into Abruzzo.

=== Roads ===
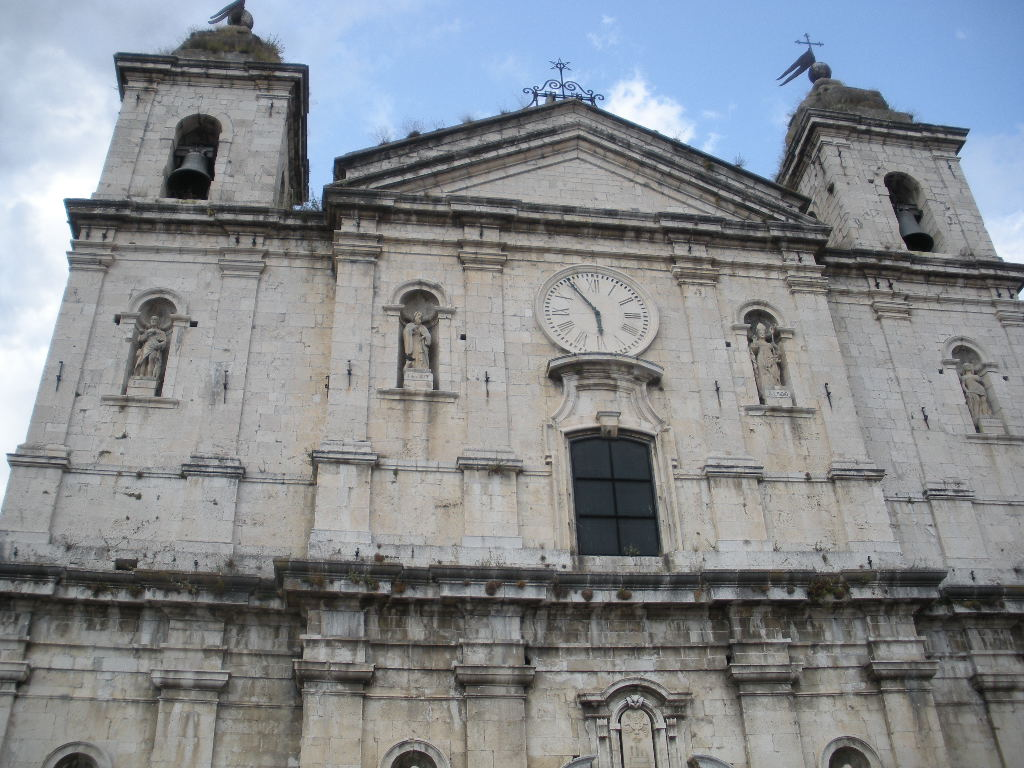
The Church of Santa Maria Assunta

The main roads are:

- The Sangro Valley road, a highway connecting Castel di Sangro with the Val di Sangro, and then with the Adriatic Sea. The same road continues for a long stretch southward and is used by thousands of tourists who come from areas of Campania and other regions of southern Italy.
- The SS 17, a fast road connecting L'Aquila to Foggia. This road is very busy, with both local and through traffic. Its true capacity is often exceeded and it has seen a large number of accidents, some fatal. It is, however, generally well-managed, remaining open throughout the winter, despite the high altitude of the route.
- The Isernia - Castel di Sangro highway. Completed in 2011, this road halved the driving time from the Alto Molise to the Alto Sangro.

== Sister city ==
- Kentville, Nova Scotia, Canada, in honour of the city's liberation in 1943 by the West Nova Scotia Regiment based at Kentville.

== Climate ==
Climate data for Castel di Sangro, elevation 805 m (2,641 ft), (1951–2000)
Month	Jan	Feb	Mar	Apr	May	Jun	Jul	Aug	Sep	Oct	Nov	Dec	Year
Record high °C (°F)	19.0 (66.2)	23.9 (75.0)	24.1 (75.4)	31.6 (88.9)	36.1 (97.0)	34.0 (93.2)	36.9 (98.4)	36.3 (97.3)	34.4 (93.9)	30.5 (86.9)	23.4 (74.1)	19.0 (66.2)	36.9 (98.4)
Mean daily maximum °C (°F)	7.6 (45.7)	8.5 (47.3)	11.4 (52.5)	14.7 (58.5)	19.2 (66.6)	23.1 (73.6)	26.0 (78.8)	26.5 (79.7)	22.6 (72.7)	17.1 (62.8)	11.9 (53.4)	8.5 (47.3)	16.4 (61.6)
Daily mean °C (°F)	2.5 (36.5)	3.3 (37.9)	5.8 (42.4)	8.8 (47.8)	12.5 (54.5)	15.8 (60.4)	18.1 (64.6)	18.3 (64.9)	15.4 (59.7)	11.0 (51.8)	6.8 (44.2)	3.9 (39.0)	10.2 (50.3)
Mean daily minimum °C (°F)	−2.5 (27.5)	−1.9 (28.6)	0.3 (32.5)	2.9 (37.2)	5.8 (42.4)	8.6 (47.5)	10.2 (50.4)	10.1 (50.2)	8.1 (46.6)	4.8 (40.6)	1.7 (35.1)	−0.7 (30.7)	4.0 (39.1)
Record low °C (°F)	−22.0 (−7.6)	−25.1 (−13.2)	−17.7 (0.1)	−8.2 (17.2)	−4.1 (24.6)	−0.3 (31.5)	1.0 (33.8)	2.5 (36.5)	−2.2 (28.0)	−9.3 (15.3)	−19.8 (−3.6)	−17.1 (1.2)	−25.1 (−13.2)
Average precipitation mm (inches)	90.6 (3.57)	84.1 (3.31)	79.1 (3.11)	82.1 (3.23)	63.4 (2.50)	55.5 (2.19)	51.3 (2.02)	43.8 (1.72)	65.0 (2.56)	98.7 (3.89)	133.1 (5.24)	118.5 (4.67)	965.2 (38.01)
Average precipitation days	9	9	9	10	9	7	6	5	7	9	11	11	102
Source: Regione Abruzzo
