= Romentino =

- Comune
- Comune di Romentino
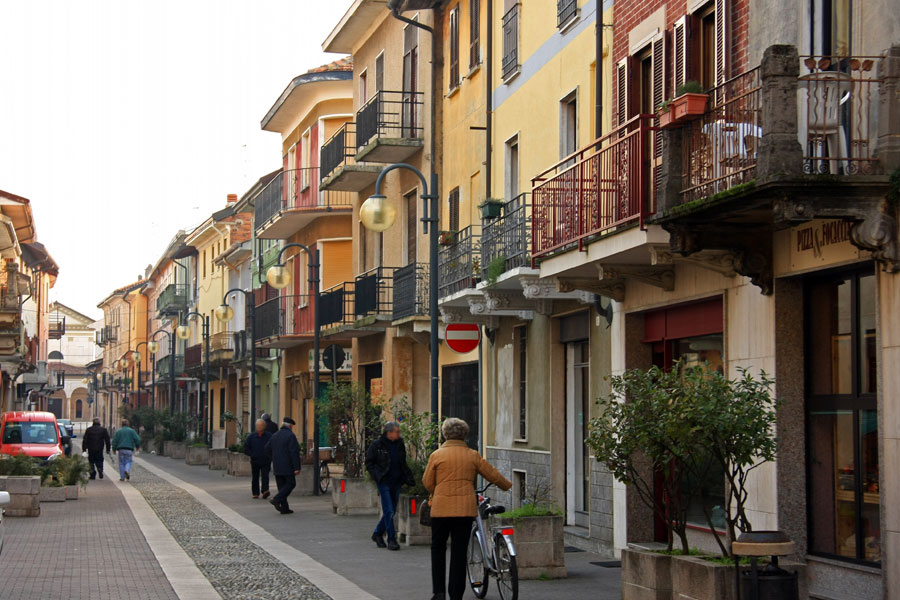
- View of Romentino

- Coat of arms

- Location within Italy Location within Piedmont
- Coordinates: 45°28′N 8°43′E
- Country: Italy
- Region: Piedmont
- Province: Novara (NO)

Government
  - Mayor: Marco Caccia

Area
  - Total: 17.69 km^{2} (6.83 sq mi)
- Elevation: 136 m (446 ft)

Population (31 December 2014)
  - Total: 5,621
  - Density: 317.8/km^{2} (823.0/sq mi)
- Demonym: Romentinesi
- Time zone: UTC+1 (CET)
  - Summer (DST): UTC+2 (CEST)
- Postal code: 28068
- Dialing code: 0321
- Patron saint: John the Baptist
- Saint day: 24 June
- Website: Official website

Romentino is a town of about 5000 inhabitants in the province of Novara, Piedmont (Northern Italy) 8 kilometres (5 mi) east of Novara and 40 kilometres (25 mi) west of Milan. It has an area of about 18 square kilometres (6.9 mi^{2}). The town mayor is Marco Caccia, since May 2019.

According to local historian Luigi Baldi, Romentino was founded by the Romans after their conquest of Cisalpine Gaul (Northern Italy) in 2nd century BC. The name of the town was Roma apud Ticinum, that means Rome near Ticino River, though other hypotheses about the original name exist.
