= Antonio De Crescentiis =

Italian politician

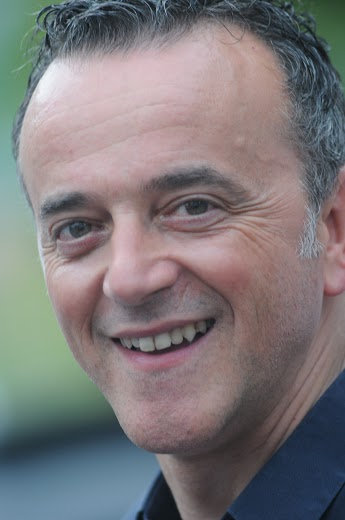

President of the Province of L'Aquila
- In office 4 May 2015 – 11 June 2017
- Preceded by: Antonio Del Corvo
- Succeeded by: Angelo Caruso

Personal details
- Born: 8 May 1968 (age 58) Pratola Peligna, Province of L'Aquila, Italy
- Party: Democratic Party

Antonio De Crescentiis (born 8 May 1968) is an Italian politician who served as president of the Province of L'Aquila.

== Biography ==
In September 1984, he was admitted as a cadet of the class 1984–1987 "Grifo" of the Nunziatella Military School of Naples, having as peers Valerio Gildoni and Ferdinando Scala. He obtained the scientific high school diploma in June 1987.

On 2 October 2000, De Crescentiis started working for the Local Sanitary Unit of Avezzano-Sulmona, in the administration section. He graduated in Law on 14 December 2004 at the University of Perugia.

== Politics ==
From 28 May 2007 to 12 June 2017, De Crescentiis served as mayor of the town of Pratola Peligna, and a member of the Consiglio delle Autonomie Locali d'Abruzzo.

On 3 May 2015, he was elected as President of the Province of L'Aquila with the 61% of votes and he maintained this office up to 12 June 2017.
