= Bruno Giordano (politician) =

Italian politician (born 1954)

Mayor of Aosta
- In office 24 May 2010 – 15 May 2015
- Preceded by: Guido Grimod
- Succeeded by: Fulvio Centoz

Personal details
- Born: 7 June 1954 (age 71) Aosta, Aosta Valley, Italy
- Party: PSDI (1975-1985); PSI (1985-1994); UV (2010-2015); Lega (since 2018)
- Profession: Employee

Bruno Giordano (born 7 June 1954) is an Italian politician.

A former member of the regionalist party Valdostan Union, he was the mayor of Aosta from May 2010 to May 2015.

== See also ==
- 2010 Italian local elections
- List of mayors of Aosta

Political offices
Preceded by Guido Grimod	Mayor of Aosta; 2010–2015	Succeeded by Fulvio Centoz
