= Museo civico aufidenate =

Coordinates: 41.7880°N 14.1029°E

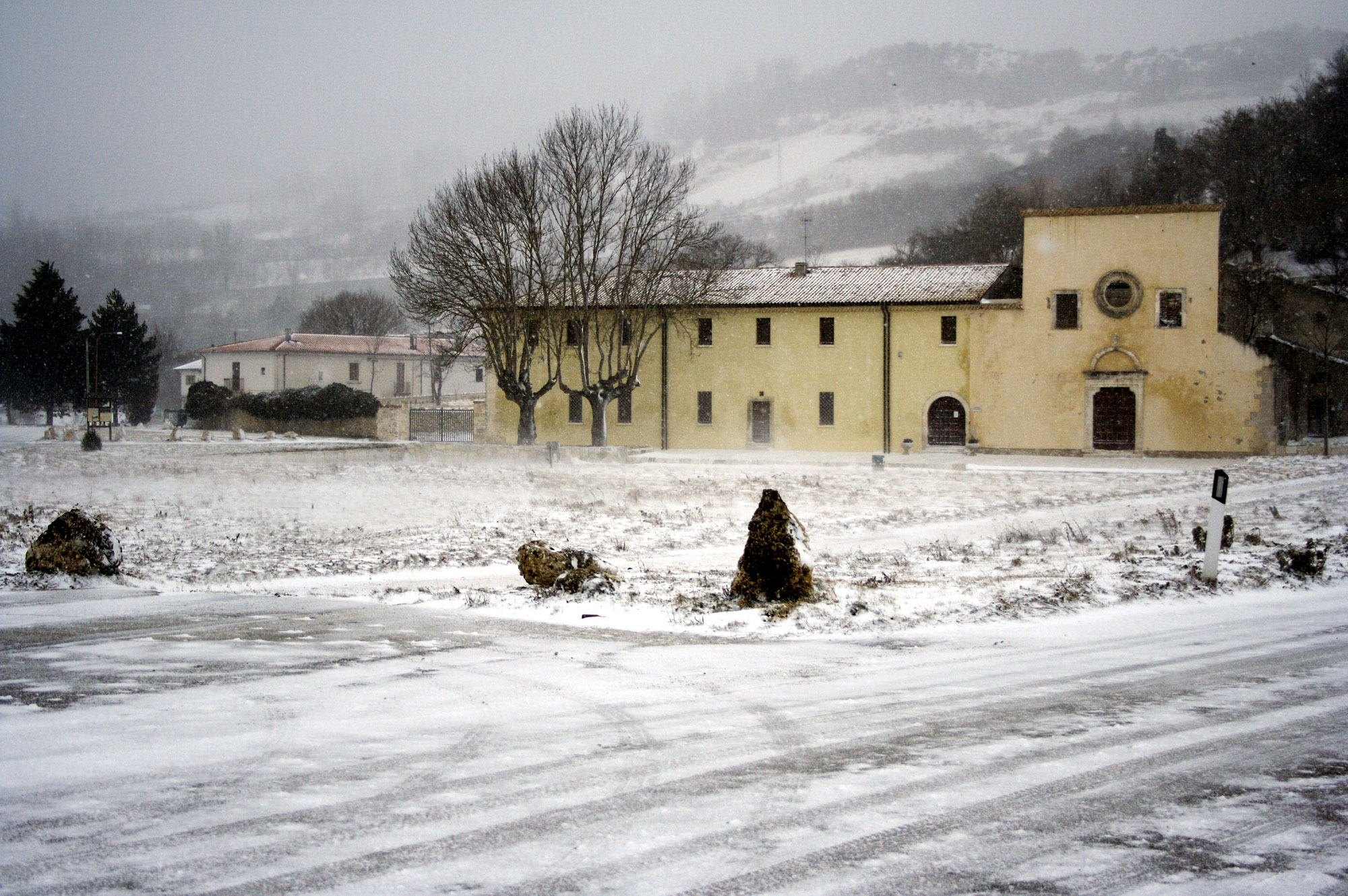
- Museo civico aufidenate
- Location: Castel di Sangro
- Type: Archaeology museum

Museo civico aufidenate (Italian for Civic Museum of Aufidena, an ancient Roman town) is an archaeology museum in Castel di Sangro, Province of L'Aquila (Abruzzo).

== History ==
The museum was established in 1898, under the name Museo Aufidenate, by the then mayor of Castel di Sangro, Colonel Clemente Marchionna. In 1924, many exhibits were stolen, but the museum remained open and was enriched with new exhibits. The bombing during World War II in 1943-44 forced its closure; there was not much damage to the infrastructure, but the exhibits remained unattended for a long time, followed by numerous lootings.

== Collection ==
The collection includes:

- Antonio De Nino Room: Prehistory and Protohistory Section - Displays a collection of fossils and archaeological evidence ranging from the Paleolithic to the Samnite period;
- Vincenzo Balzano Room: Italic-Roman Section - Exhibits stone materials, handles with Rhodian and Oscan stamps, funerary steles, and findings from excavations and surveys, including the museum's symbol: the Aufidenate Bull;
- Ezio Mattiocco Room: Manufacturing Section - This section houses ceramics found at Civita and Porta Caprara, representing the city's production from the 15th to the 19th century;
- Rolando Giampaolo Room: Second World War Section - A permanent exhibition dedicated to the German defensive line "Gustav," used as a territorial divider;
- Sacred Art Room: Ancient and Religious Art Section - Displays late Renaissance, Baroque, 18th-century, and modern works;
- Cosimo Savastano Room: Contemporary Painting - This section showcases modern canvases created by international artists during the 1980s and 1990s;
- Multipurpose Room: Cultural Events Section - This room, located within the former Convent Church premises, hosts numerous exhibitions and dedicated events;
- Botanical Garden: Naturalistic Section - An external space, used in the 19th century for the experimentation of foreign plantings, featuring a path leading to the "monks' table," a roughly hewn limestone block probably dedicated to prayer or meditation.
