= Stefania Pezzopane =

Italian politician (born 1960)

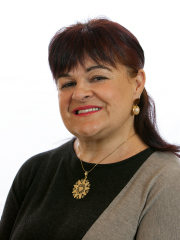
- Pezzopane in 2013

President of the Province of L'Aquila
- In office 28 June 2004 – 30 March 2010
- Preceded by: Palmiero Susi
- Succeeded by: Antonio Del Corvo

Member of the Senate of the Republic
- In office 19 March 2013 – 22 March 2018

Member of the Chamber of Deputies
- In office 23 March 2018 – 12 October 2022

Regional assessor for Urban planning, Environment and Culture of Abruzzo
- In office 6 June 1995 – 3 March 2000
- President: Antonio Falconio

Member of the Regional Council of Abruzzo
- In office 5 May 1995 – 17 February 2005

Personal details
- Born: 4 January 1960 (age 66) L'Aquila, Italy
- Party: Italian Communist Party; Democratic Party of the Left; Democrats of the Left; Democratic Party
- Education: University of Teramo

Stefania Pezzopane (born 4 January 1960) is an Italian politician of the Democratic Party. She served as president of the Province of L'Aquila from 2004 to 2010, as a senator of the Republic from 2013 to 2018, and as a member of the Chamber of Deputies from 2018 to 2022. She previously served as vice president of the Regional Council of Abruzzo from 2000 to 2002 and as a regional councillor and assessor. Since 2022, she has been a member of the municipal council of L'Aquila, after an unsuccessful run for the office of mayor.
