= List of presidents of the Province of Novara =

President of the Province of Novara
- Presidente della Provincia di Novara
- Incumbent; Marco Caccia since 15 September 2025
- Term length: 4 years
- Inaugural holder: Carlo Maggia
- Formation: 1889

The president of the Province of Novara is the head of the provincial government in Novara, Piedmont, Italy. The president oversees the administration of the province, coordinates the activities of the municipalities, and represents the province in regional and national matters.

Since September 2025, the office has been held by Marco Caccia of Brothers of Italy.

== List ==
=== Presidents of the Provincial Deputation (1889–1926) ===
Nº	Portrait	Name	Term		Party
Nº	Portrait	Name	Start	End	Party
1		Carlo Maggia	1889	1910	
2		Basilio Calderini	1910	?	

=== Presidents of the Province (1951–present) ===
No.	Portrait	Name	Term of office		Party
No.	Portrait	Name	Start	End	Party
1		Giuseppe Bonfantini	1951	?	Italian Socialist Party
–		?	?	?	?
		Sergio Giroldi	10 March 1988	18 July 1990	Christian Democracy
		Roberto Negri	18 July 1990	19 October 1993	Christian Democracy
		Luciano De Silvestri	19 October 1993	8 May 1995	Federation of the Greens
		Paolo Cattaneo	8 May 1995	28 June 1999	Italian People's Party
		Maurizio Pagani	28 June 1999	28 June 2004	Forza Italia
		Sergio Vedovato	28 June 2004	8 June 2009	Democrats of the Left; Democratic Party
		Diego Sozzani	8 June 2009	11 July 2014	The People of Freedom
–		Luca Bona (Prefectural commissioner)	11 July 2014	14 October 2014	—
		Matteo Besozzi	14 October 2014	31 October 2018	Democratic Party
		Federico Binatti	31 October 2018	29 January 2023	Brothers of Italy
		Federico Binatti	29 January 2023	16 June 2025	Brothers of Italy
–		Andrea Crivelli (Acting president)	16 June 2025	15 September 2025	Forza Italia
		Marco Caccia	15 September 2025	Incumbent	Brothers of Italy

== Sources ==
- "Storia amministrativa dell'ente". Ministero dell'Interno.
- Menichini, Piera (2005). "I presidenti delle Province dall'Unità alla Grande guerra: repertorio analitico". Storia Amministrazione Costituzione (13): 268–269.
