= Torre di Feudozzo =

Coordinates: 41°45′58″N 14°11′30″E

- Frazione
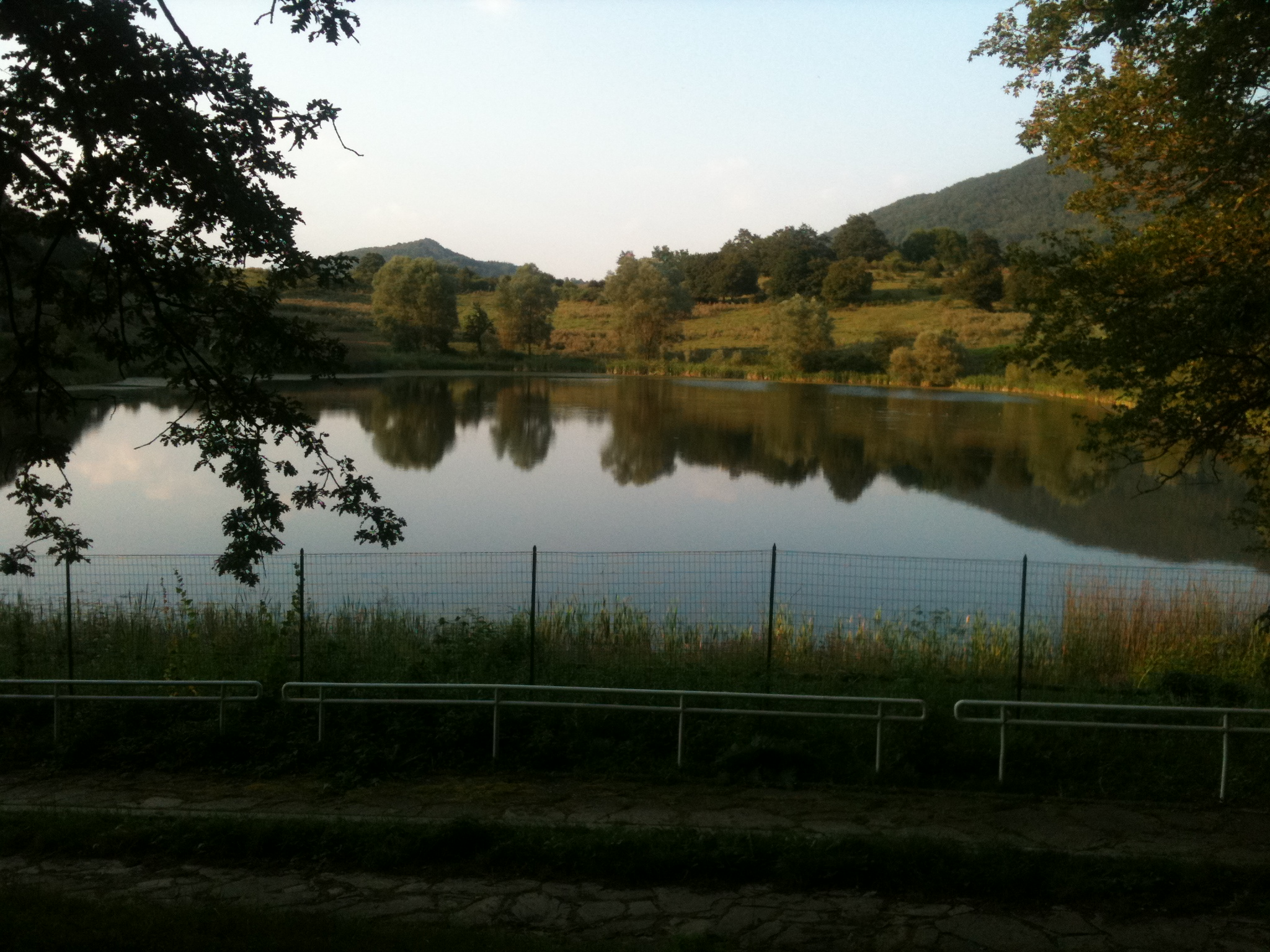
- Interactive map of Torre di Feudozzo
- Country: Italy
- Region: Abruzzo
- Province: L'Aquila
- Commune: Castel di Sangro
- Time zone: UTC+1 (CET)
  - Summer (DST): UTC+2 (CEST)

Torre di Feudozzo is a frazione of Castel di Sangro, in the Province of L'Aquila, in the Abruzzo, region of Italy.
