= Gianni Nuti =

Italian politician

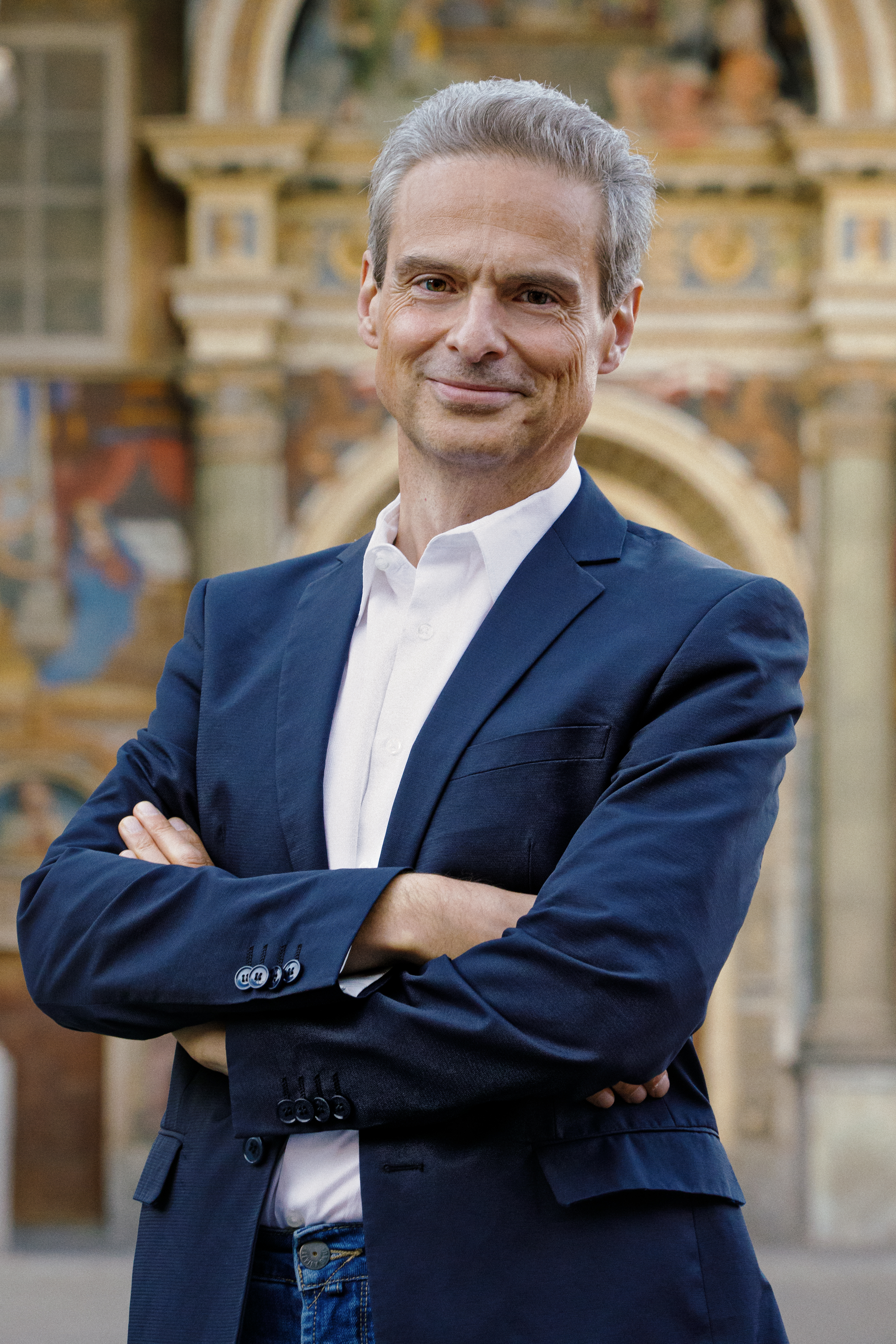

Mayor of Aosta
- In office 6 October 2020 – 15 October 2025
- Preceded by: Fulvio Centoz
- Succeeded by: Raffaele Rocco

Personal details
- Born: 8 September 1964 (age 62) Asti, Piedmont, Italy
- Party: Independent (centre-left)
- Education: University of Turin
- Profession: Musicologist, professor

Gianni Nuti (born 8 September 1964) is an Italian musicologist and politician.

He ran for Mayor of Aosta as an independent at the 2020 Italian local elections, supported by a centre-left coalition. He was elected at the second round with 53% and took office on 6 October 2020.

== See also ==
- 2020 Italian local elections
- List of mayors of Aosta

Political offices
| Preceded by Fulvio Centoz | Mayor of Aosta; 2020-2025 | Succeeded by Raffaele Rocco |
