= Marco Caccia =

Italian politician (born 1966)

President of the Province of Novara
- Incumbent
- Assumed office 15 September 2025
- Preceded by: Federico Binatti

Mayor of Romentino
- Incumbent
- Assumed office 27 May 2019
- Preceded by: Alessio Biondo

Personal details
- Born: 15 May 1966 (age 60) Novara, Italy
- Party: Brothers of Italy
- Occupation: Architect

Marco Caccia (born 15 May 1966) is an Italian politician and architect serving as president of the Province of Novara since 2025. He has served as mayor of Romentino since 2019.

Caccia entered politics as a member of Forza Italia and was elected to the municipal council of Romentino continuously from 1995. He later joined Brothers of Italy. He was elected mayor of Romentino in 2019 and re-elected in 2024. In September 2025, Caccia was elected president of the Province of Novara with 66% of the vote, receiving 51,631 weighted votes against Giuliano Pacileo, the mayor of Cameri.
