= Angelo Caruso =

Italian politician

President of the Province of L'Aquila
- Incumbent
- Assumed office 31 July 2017
- Preceded by: Antonio De Crescentiis

Mayor of Castel di Sangro
- Incumbent
- Assumed office 1 June 2015
- Preceded by: Umberto Murolo

Personal details
- Born: 31 May 1965 (age 61) Castel di Sangro, Province of L'Aquila, Italy
- Profession: Lawyer

Angelo Caruso (born 31 May 1965) is an Italian politician who has served as president of the Province of L'Aquila since 2017.

== Life and career ==
Caruso graduated in law and worked as a lawyer.

He began his political activity in the Christian Democracy (DC). He was elected to the Castel di Sangro municipal council in 1990 and served continuously until his election as mayor in 2015. During his municipal career, he also served as assessor and deputy mayor. He was re-elected mayor of Castel di Sangro in 2020 and in 2026.

On 31 July 2017, he was elected president of the Province of L'Aquila, supported by a centre-right coalition. He was subsequently re-elected as president in 2021 and 2025.

In 2018, Caruso was elected president of the UPI Abruzzo executive board, becoming a member of the national board of the Union of Italian Provinces (UPI). On 23 March 2023, he was appointed vice president of UPI. In 2021, he was appointed by the minister of tourism Massimo Garavaglia as a member of the National Tourism Committee.
