= Politics of Aosta Valley =

The politics of Aosta Valley, a region of Italy, takes place in the framework of a parliamentary representative democracy, whereby the President of Aosta Valley is the head of government, and of a pluralistic multi-party system. Executive power is exercised by the Regional Government. Legislative power is vested in the Regional Council.

== Executive branch ==
The Regional Government (Italian: Giunta Regionale, French: Junte régionale) is presided by the President of the Region (Italian: Presidente della Regione, French: Président de la région) and is composed by the President and the Assessors (Italian: Assessori, French: Assesseurs, i.e. regional ministers), who are currently seven.

=== List of presidents ===
Presidents of the Aosta Valley region
President	Party	Term	Legislature
Federico Chabod	Action Party	10 January 1946 – 24 October 1946	Provisional
Severino Caveri	Valdostan Union	24 October 1946 – 20 May 1949	Provisional
Severino Caveri	Valdostan Union	20 May 1949 – 8 December 1954	I Legislature
Vittorino Bondaz	Christian Democracy	8 December 1954 – 16 June 1959	II Legislature
Oreste Marcoz	Valdostan Union	16 June 1959 – 24 November 1963	III Legislature
Severino Caveri	Valdostan Union	24 November 1963 – 30 May 1966	IV Legislature
Cesare Bionaz	Christian Democracy	30 May 1966 1966 – 20 May 1968	IV Legislature
Cesare Bionaz	Christian Democracy	20 May 1968 – 1 July 1969	V Legislature
Mauro Bordon	Christian Democracy	1 July 1969 – 7 April 1970	V Legislature
Cesare Dujany	Popular Democrats	7 April 1970 – 19 July 1973	V Legislature
Cesare Dujany	Popular Democrats	19 July 1973 – 15 November 1974	VI Legislature
Mario Andrione	Valdostan Union	20 December 1974 – 18 July 1978	VI Legislature
Mario Andrione	Valdostan Union	18 July 1978 – 20 July 1983	VII Legislature
Mario Andrione	Valdostan Union	20 July 1983 – 4 January 1984	VIII Legislature
Augusto Rollandin	Valdostan Union	4 January 1984 – 26 July 1988	VIII Legislature
Augusto Rollandin	Valdostan Union	26 July 1988 – 25 June 1990	IX Legislature
Gianni Bondaz	Christian Democracy	25 June 1990 – 3 June 1992	IX Legislature
Ilario Lanivi	Independent Autonomists	3 June 1992 – 29 June 1993	IX Legislature
Dino Viérin	Valdostan Union	29 June 1993 – 29 June 1998	X Legislature
Dino Viérin	Valdostan Union	29 June 1998 – 18 December 2002	XI Legislature
Roberto Louvin	Valdostan Union	18 December 2002 – 7 July 2003	XI Legislature
Carlo Perrin	Valdostan Union	7 July 2003 – 4 July 2005	XII Legislature
Luciano Caveri	Valdostan Union	4 July 2005 – 30 June 2008	XII Legislature
Augusto Rollandin	Valdostan Union	30 June 2008 – 30 June 2013	XIII Legislature
Augusto Rollandin	Valdostan Union	30 June 2013 – 10 March 2017	XIV Legislature
Pierluigi Marquis	Edelweiss	10 March 2017 – 11 October 2017	XIV Legislature
Laurent Viérin	Progressive Valdostan Union	11 October 2017 – 27 June 2018	XIV Legislature
Nicoletta Spelgatti	Aosta Valley League	27 June 2018 – 10 December 2018	XV Legislature
Antonio Fosson	For Our Valley	10 December 2018 – 16 December 2019	XV Legislature
Renzo Testolin	Valdostan Union	16 December 2019 – 21 October 2020	XV Legislature
Erik Lavévaz	Valdostan Union	21 October 2020 – 25 January 2023	XVI Legislature
Renzo Testolin	Valdostan Union	2 March 2023 – 6 November 2025	XVI Legislature
Renzo Testolin	Valdostan Union	6 November 2025 – present	XVII Legislature

Source: Regional Government of Aosta Valley – Governments since 1946

== Legislative branch ==
The Regional Council of Aosta Valley (Italian: Consiglio regionale della Valle d'Aosta, French: Conseil de la Vallée) is composed of 35 members. The council is elected for a five-year term. Stefano Aggravi (Valdostan Rally — Autonomists of the Centre) has served as President of the Council since November 2025.

=== Current composition ===
The XVII legislature of the Regional Council is composed as follows:

Party	Seats	Status
Valdostan Union (UV)	12 / 35	In government
Autonomists of the Centre (AdC)	5 / 35	In government
Brothers of Italy (FdI)	4 / 35	In opposition
Forza Italia (FI)	3 / 35	In government
League Aosta Valley (Lega)	3 / 35	In opposition
Democratic Party (PD)	3 / 35	In opposition
Greens and Left Alliance (AVS)	3 / 35	In opposition
For Autonomy (Pl'A)	1 / 35	In opposition
The Valdostan Renaissance (LRV)	1 / 35	In opposition

== Political parties and elections ==
=== Latest regional election ===
In the latest regional election, which took place on 28 September 2025, the Valdostan Union, which had absorbed the Valdostan Alliance and Mouv', as well as joined forces with the minor-separatist Sovereign Aosta Country party, came largely first, followed by the centre-right coalition (composed of Brothers of Italy, Forza Italia–LRV and Lega Vallée d'Aoste) and the Autonomists of the Centre (formed by Edelweiss, For Autonomy, the Valdostan Rally, the regional section of Action and others).

Party or alliance		Votes	%	Seats
Valdostan Union		19,304	31.97	13
Centre-right coalition	Brothers of Italy	6,634	10.99	4
Centre-right coalition	Forza Italia–LRV	6,066	10.05	4
Centre-right coalition	Lega Vallée d'Aoste	5,062	8.38	3
Centre-right coalition	Total	17,762	29.42	11
Autonomists of the Centre		8,483	14.05	6
Democratic Party		4,854	8.04	3
Greens and Left Alliance–RC		3,816	6.32	2
Open Aosta Valley		3,359	5.56	0
Future Aosta Valley		2,800	4.64	0
Total		60,378	100.00	35
Valid votes		60,378	92.87	
Invalid/blank votes		4,636	7.13	
Total votes		65,014	100.00	
Registered voters/turnout		103,223	62.98	
Source: Autonomous Region of Aosta Valley – Results – ANSA

=== Latest general election ===
Chamber of Deputies

Candidate	Party or alliance		Votes	%
Franco Manes	VdA–CSX	UV	20,763	38.63
Emily Rini	CDX	FI	16,016	29.80
Giovanni Girardini	none	LRV	6,398	11.90
Erika Guichardaz	Open VdA (Note: Five Star Movement (M5S), Democratic Area – Autonomist Left (AD–GA), Environment Rights Equality (ADU), and Italian Left (SI))	AD–GA	5,841	10.87
Loredana Ronc	ISP	TBA	2,302	4.28
Loredana De Rosa	UP	TBA	1,375	2.56
Davide Ianni	none	PCI	1,051	1.96
Total			53,746	100.00
Valid votes			53,746	90.34
Invalid/blank votes			5,744	9.66
Total votes			59,490	100.00
Registered voters/turnout			98,187	60.59

Senate

Candidate	Party or alliance		Votes	%
Nicoletta Spelgatti	CDX	Lega	18,509	34.05
Patrik Vesan	VdA–CSX	PD	18,282	33.63
Augusto Rollandin	none	PlA	7,272	13.38
Daria Pulz	Open VdA	ADU	5,448	10.02
Alessandro Bichini	ISP	TBA	1,569	2.89
Francesco Lucat	UP	PRC	1,311	2.41
Guglielmo Leray	none	PCI	1,051	1.93
Larisa Bargan	Vita	TBA	917	1.69
Total			54,359	100.00
Valid votes			54,359	91.38
Invalid/blank votes			5,131	8.62
Total votes			59,490	100.00
Registered voters/turnout			98,187	60.59

== Sources ==
- Regional Council of Aosta Valley – History of Aosta Valley
- Regional Government of Aosta Valley – Governments since 1946
- Regional Government of Aosta Valley – Elections
- Cattaneo Institute – Archive of Election Data
- Parties and Elections in Europe – Aosta Valley
- Ministry of the Interior – Historical Archive of Elections
