= List of political parties in Aosta Valley =

Several political parties operate in Aosta Valley, Italy. No one party has ever had the chance of gaining power alone and thus parties must work with each other to form coalition governments. The Valdostan Union has been the region's largest in most regional elections.

== 2025 regional election ==
Party or alliance		Votes	%	Seats
Valdostan Union		19,304	31.97	13
Centre-right coalition	Brothers of Italy	6,634	10.99	4
Centre-right coalition	Forza Italia–LRV	6,066	10.05	4
Centre-right coalition	Lega Vallée d'Aoste	5,062	8.38	3
Centre-right coalition	Total	17,762	29.42	11
Autonomists of the Centre		8,483	14.05	6
Democratic Party		4,854	8.04	3
Greens and Left Alliance		3,816	6.32	2
Open Aosta Valley		3,359	5.56	0
Future Aosta Valley		2,800	4.64	0
Total		60,378	100.00	35
Valid votes		60,378	92.87	
Invalid/blank votes		4,636	7.13	
Total votes		65,014	100.00	
Registered voters/turnout		103,223	62.98	
Source: Autonomous Region of Aosta Valley – Results – ANSA

== Regionalist parties ==
Several regionalist parties operate in Aosta Valley. This is a list of current and former regionalist parties.

=== Current parties ===
- Valdostan Union (Union Valdôtaine), including:
  - Sovereign Aosta Country (Pays d'Aoste Souverain)
- Aosta Valley League (Lega Vallée d'Aoste)
- Autonomists of the Centre (Autonomisti di Centro), including:
  - Edelweiss (Stella Alpina)
  - For Autonomy (Pour l'Autonomie)
  - Valdostan Rally (Rassemblement Valdôtain)
  - Spirit (Esprì)
- The Valdostan Renaissance (La Renaissance Valdôtaine)
- Civic Network (Rete Civica)
- Open Aosta Valley (Valle d'Aosta Aperta), including:
  - Democratic Area – Autonomist Left (Area Democratica / Gauche Autonomiste)
  - Environment Rights Equality (Ambiente Diritti Uguaglianza)
- Future Aost Valley (Valle d'Aosta Futura)

=== Former parties ===
- Aosta Valley Regional Rally (Raggruppamento Regionale Valle d'Aosta)
- Italian Democratic Group (Gruppo Democratico Italiano)
- Valdostan Rally (Rassemblement Valdôtain, ⇒ Valdostan Union)
- Valdostan Democratic Union (Union Democratique Valdôtaine)
- Progressive Valdostan Union (1973) (Union Valdôtaine Progressiste, ⇒ Progressive Democratic Autonomists)
- Valdostan Craftsmen and Traders (Artigiani e Commercianti Valdostani)
- Popular Democrats (Democratici Popolari, ⇒ Progressive Democratic Autonomists)
- Free Zone List (Lista Zona Franca)
- Autonomist Union (Union Autonomiste, ⇒ Lega Alpina Lumbarda)
- Progressive Democratic Autonomists (Autonomistes Démocrates Progressistes, ⇒ Autonomist Federation)
- Independent Autonomists (Autonomisti Indipendenti, ⇒ For Aosta Valley)
- For Aosta Valley (Pour la Vallée d'Aoste, ⇒ Autonomists)
- Autonomist People's Alliance (Alleanza Popolare Autonomista, ⇒ Autonomist Federation)
- Autonomists (Autonomistes, ⇒ Edelweiss)
- Autonomist Federation (Fédération autonomiste, ⇒ Valdostan Union)
- Forward Valley (Alé Vallée, ⇒ Democratic Party)
- Alternative Greens (Verdi Alternativi, ⇒ Rainbow Aosta Valley)
- Rainbow Aosta Valley (Arcobaleno Valle d'Aosta, ⇒ Autonomy Liberty Participation Ecology)
- Valdostan Renewal (Renouveau valdôtain, ⇒ Autonomy Liberty Participation Ecology)
- Lively Aosta Valley (Vallée d'Aoste vive, ⇒ Autonomy Liberty Participation Ecology)
- Autonomy Liberty Participation Ecology (Autonomie, Liberté, Participation, Ecologie, ⇒ Valdostan Alliance)
- Progressive Valdostan Union (Union Valdôtaine Progressiste, ⇒ Valdostan Alliance)
- Valdostan Independentists (Indépendantistes Valdôtains)
- For Our Valley (Pour Notre Vallée)
- Mouv' (Mouv', ⇒ Valdostan Union)
- Valdostan Autonomist Popular Edelweiss (Edelweiss Popolare Autonomista Valdostano, ⇒ For Autonomy)
- Civic Commitment (Impegno Civico, ⇒ Civic Network)
- New Aosta Valley (Nuova Valle d'Aosta)
- Valdostan Alliance (Alliance Valdôtaine, ⇒ Valdostan Union)

== See also ==
- List of political parties in Italy
