= 2025 Valdostan regional election =

Italian regional election

- 28 September 2025
- All 35 seats to the Regional Council of Aosta Valley
- Turnout: 62.98% (▼7.52%)
Party	Leader	Vote %	Seats	+/–
UV	Joël Farcoz	31.97	13	+6
AdC	Marco Carrel	14.05	6	New
FdI	Alberto Zucchi	10.99	4	+4
FI–LRV	Pierluigi Marquis	10.05	4	+4
Lega VdA	Marialice Boldi	8.38	3	−8
PD	Paolo Crétier	8.04	3	−2
AVS–RC	Chiara Minelli	6.32	2	0
This lists parties that won seats. See the complete results below.
Election results by electoral district
President before	President after
Renzo Testolin; UV	Renzo Testolin; UV

The 2025 Valdostan regional election took place on 28 September 2025 in Aosta Valley, Italy. The election was part of the wider 2025 Italian regional elections. The election was marked by a clear victory for Valdostan Union (UV), which emerged as the leading party with 32% of the vote, reaffirming its central role in the region's political landscape.

== Electoral law ==
The Regional Council of Aosta Valley (Italian: Consiglio regionale della Valle d'Aosta, French: Conseil de la Vallée) is composed by 35 members. The Council is elected for a five-year term. There is only one regional constituency. The President of Aosta Valley is elected by the Council. The electoral law was recently changed by the L.R. 16/2017 and the L.R. 9/2019.

The election of the Regional Council is based on a direct choice for the candidate and it is possible to express only one preference for the list. If a single party list or a coalition of party lists gets more than 42% of valid votes cast, it is assigned a majority bonus of 21 seats. If no one reaches this threshold, the seats are determined proportionally. For the proportional allocation there are two thresholds: given the largest remainder method by dividing the valid votes cast for all lists and the seats to be assigned, if a party list doesn't reach the minimum quota required, the party list is excluded to the allocation of the seats. However, if a party list gets only one seat during the first allocation of seats, it is excluded and its seat is reallocated.

== Background ==
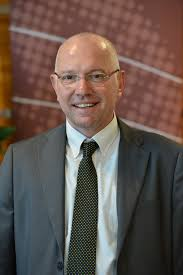
Renzo Testolin, incumbent president

In the 2020 regional election, the Valdostan Union (UV) was reduced to 15.8%, its second worst result ever, while the Lega Vallée d'Aoste (LNVdA) came a stronger first. However, after the election, UV leader Erik Lavévaz formed a government composed of the PD, Civic Network (RC), the Valdostan Alliance (AV), Edelweiss (SA) and Mouv'. Within a year, AV and Mouv' joined forces, while the RC-led Progressive Civic Project (PCP) left the government. In 2023 Testolin formed a new government, which, differently from Lavévaz's, comprised also For Autonomy.

The largest regional party UV decided to not participate in the 2024 European Parliament election citing the electoral system. In late 2023, Mouv' and the AV started a merging process into the UV. In June 2024, at an extraordinary congress of the UV, the reunion was finally approved. In December 2024, Laurent Viérin's Valdostan Pride followed. The Sovereign Aosta Country (PAS) stated that they are open for a coalition. In July 2024, rumors came out of a coalition between SA, Valdostan Rally (RV), For Autonomy and Evolvendo after they rejected the invitation by PAS. In October, these parties alongside Renaissance started negotiations for a "centrist, liberal-democratic and reformist" coalition. In March 2025, PAS announced that they negotiate with UV and did not rule out running as independents on their list and SA, RV and For Autonomy formed "Autonomists of the Centre" endorsed by Esprì and Evolvendo. Renaissance left the coalition for concerns about RV. On 6 August 2025, UV and PAS signed an agreement to run together. In June, PD proposed an alliance for the local and regional elections with UV and AdC. Shortly before the deadline, UV proposed a coalition with AdC which was rejected by For Autonomy.

In June 2024, the Centre-right coalition (Lega, FI, FdI, NM, UDC) announced that they plan to run as a coalition. In April 2025, they were joined by The Valdostan Renaissance (LRV). LRV formed a joint list with FI.

In December, Open VdA (M5S, AD–GA, SI/ADU) announced its intention to run on a joint list. In February 2025, Erika Guichardaz stated that PCP "ceased to exist" and excluded running on a list which goes from RC, via Power to the People to Legambiente. On 22 April 2025, RC announced that they will run with Greens and Left Alliance. Risorgimento Socialista and Communist Refoundation Party joined Open VdA the same day.

== Parties ==
Coalition/Party		Main ideology	Seats
Valdostan Union (incl. PAS)		Regionalism	11
Centre-right coalition	Lega Vallée d'Aoste	Right-wing populism	6
Centre-right coalition	Forza Italia–Together–LRV	Liberal conservatism	3
Centre-right coalition	Brothers of Italy (incl. NM)	National conservatism	0
Autonomists of the Centre (RV, PlA, SA, Az)		Christian democracy	8
Democratic Party–Progressive Federalists		Social democracy	5
Greens and Left Alliance–Civic Network (incl. PaP)		Eco-socialism	1
Open Aosta Valley (AD–GA, M5S, ADU, PRC–RS)		Democratic socialism	1
Future Aosta Valley		Populism	1

== Outcome ==
=== Results ===
Party or alliance		Votes	%	Seats
Valdostan Union		19,304	31.97	13
Centre-right coalition	Brothers of Italy	6,634	10.99	4
Centre-right coalition	Forza Italia–LRV	6,066	10.05	4
Centre-right coalition	Lega Vallée d'Aoste	5,062	8.38	3
Centre-right coalition	Total	17,762	29.42	11
Autonomists of the Centre		8,483	14.05	6
Democratic Party		4,854	8.04	3
Greens and Left Alliance–RC		3,816	6.32	2
Open Aosta Valley		3,359	5.56	0
Future Aosta Valley		2,800	4.64	0
Total		60,378	100.00	35
Valid votes		60,378	92.87	
Invalid/blank votes		4,636	7.13	
Total votes		65,014	100.00	
Registered voters/turnout		103,223	62.98	
Source: Autonomous Region of Aosta Valley – Results – ANSA

Popular vote by parties
UV	31.97%
AdC	14.05%
FdI	10.99%
FI–LRV	10.05%
Lega	8.38%
PD	8.04%
AVS–RC	6.32%
VdAA	5.56%
VdAF	4.64%

Popular vote by alliances
UV	31.97%
CD	29.42%
AdC	14.05%
PD	8.04%
AVS–RC	6.32%
VdAA	5.56%
VdAF	4.64%

Seats
UV	37.14%
AdC	17.14%
FdI	11.43%
FI–LRV	11.43%
Lega	8.57%
PD	8.57%
AVS–RC	5.71%

=== Results by electoral district ===
District	UV	AdC	FdI	FI–LRV	Lega	PD	AVS	VdAA	VdAF
Valdigne – Mont Blanc	32.91%	14.99%	16.35%	8.70%	8.91%	5.95%	3.59%	4.11%	4.48%
Grand Paradis	34.11%	13.39%	11.00%	9.16%	9.83%	6.66%	4.94%	6.16%	4.74%
Grand Combin	42.01%	13.56%	7.78%	7.40%	6.46%	4.57%	4.88%	5.79%	7.37%
Mont Émilius	31.15%	15.41%	10.39%	9.50%	7.21%	7.58%	5.89%	6.68%	6.20%
Évançon	43.14%	12.77%	11.32%	6.55%	7.93%	6.69%	5.42%	3.98%	2.20%
Monte Rosa – Walser	44.91%	9.72%	9.59%	5.26%	6.01%	7.58%	10.83%	3.31%	2.79%
Aosta	18.90%	13.90%	11.88%	15.43%	8.31%	12.38%	7.76%	7.01%	4.42%

=== Turnout ===
Voter turnout
Sunday, September 28						Previous election
12:00 PM		19:00 PM		23:00 PM		Previous election
22,379	21.68%	52,656	51.01%	65,009	62.98%	▼7.52%

=== Elected councillors ===
Party	Councillor	Votes
UV	Renzo Testolin	3,808
UV	Speranza Girod	3,004
UV	Luigi Bertschy	2,413
UV	Davide Sapinet	2,166
UV	Loredana Petey	1,634
UV	Giulio Grosjacques	1,662
UV	Erik Lavévaz	1,476
UV	Josette Borre	1,410
UV	Laurent Viérin	1,400
UV	Corrado Jordan	1,310
UV	Aurelio Marguerettaz	1,278
UV	Michel Martinet	1,263
UV	Cristina Machet	1,246
AdC	Marco Carrel	1,869
AdC	Leonardo Lotto	1,494
AdC	Carlo Marzi	1,363
AdC	Luisa Anna Trione	1,098
AdC	Stefano Aggravi	1,033
AdC	Marco Vierin	1,032
FdI	Massimo Lattanzi	649
FdI	Alberto Zucchi	599
FdI	Massimiliano Tuccari	451
FdI	Aldo Damiaco	364
FI–LRV	Marco Sorbara	1,075
FI–LRV	Mauro Baccega	781
FI–LRV	Eleonora Baccini	657
FI–LRV	Pierluigi Marquis	591
Lega	Andrea Fabrizio Manfrin	1,397
Lega	Corrado Bellora	622
Lega	Simone Perron	552
PD	Jean-Pierre Guichardaz	701
PD	Fulvio Centoz	607
PD	Clotilde Forcellati	473
AVS	Chiara Minelli	961
AVS	Eugenio Torrione	361

== Government formation ==
Emerging as the first political force with a plurality of seats, the Valdostan Union led negotiations to form a government. Initially, some commentators believed that a UV-AdC-PD government was a probable outcome. Before the election, UV stated their preference for an Autonomist coalition with just AdC but it was seen as unlikely because was predicted to lack a stable majority of 20 seats. After clearing a legal hurdle on a new mandate, former regional president Testolin was entrusted in a vote by the UV's base to lead negotiations. After having met with all political parties, UV and AdC chose the center-right FI as their governing partner. The move made LRV councillor Elena Baccini leave the FI group in the council, and led to For Autonomy's Marco Carrel being ousted from the AdC group in the council due to UV's Testolin reportedly not wanting him in the ruling majority. On November 6, Testolin was elected president of Aosta Valley with 21 votes in favor out of 35, with the UV-AdC-FI regional government receiving 22 votes in favor. Stefano Aggravi (AdC, RV) was elected president of the regional council.

== See also ==
- 2025 Italian local elections
