= 2025 Italian regional elections =

- 28 September – 24 November 2025

Presidents and regional assemblies of Aosta Valley, Apulia, Calabria, Campania, Marche, Tuscany, and Veneto
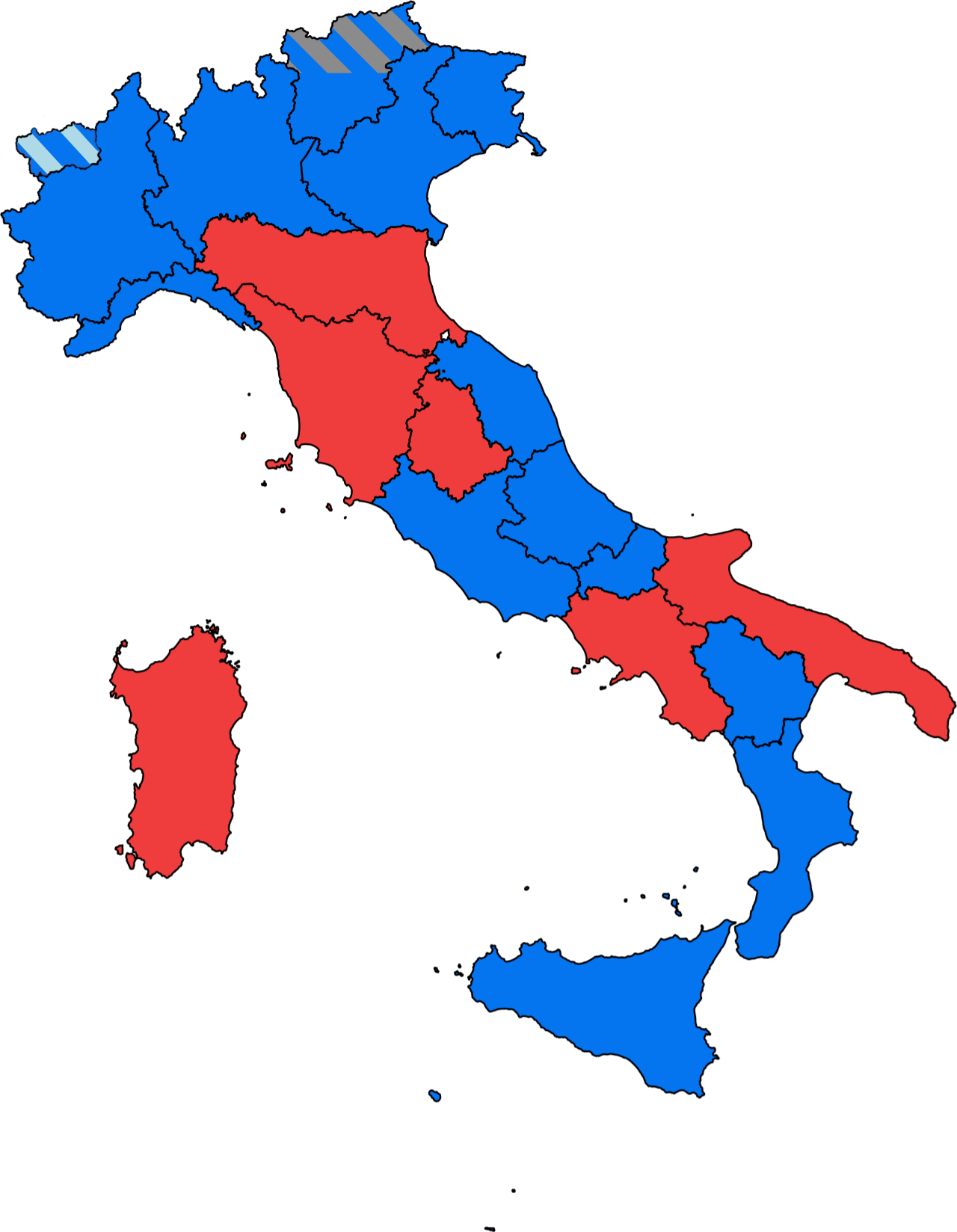
- Italian regions by coalition of the ruling president after the elections

The 2025 Italian regional elections took place in seven regions of Italy over the course of the year. These elections followed the 2025 Italian referendum, which did not reach the required quorum for validity due to low voter turnout.

== Overall results ==
=== Regional councils ===
Alliance	Votes	%	Seats
Centre-left coalition	3,783,392	49.7	124 / 256
Centre-right coalition	3,564,232	46.8	130 / 256
Others	261,317	3.5	2 / 256
Total	7,608,941	100	256 / 256

=== Presidents of the regions ===
Region	Election day	Outgoing			Elected		
Region	Election day	President	Party	Alliance	President	Party	Alliance
Aosta Valley	28 September	Renzo Testolin	UV	Centre-left	Renzo Testolin	UV	Centre-right
Marche	28–29 September	Francesco Acquaroli	FdI	Centre-right	Francesco Acquaroli	FdI	Centre-right
Calabria	5–6 October	Roberto Occhiuto	FI	Centre-right	Roberto Occhiuto	FI	Centre-right
Tuscany	12–13 October	Eugenio Giani	PD	Centre-left	Eugenio Giani	PD	Centre-left
Apulia	23–24 November	Michele Emiliano	Ind	Centre-left	Antonio Decaro	PD	Centre-left
Campania	23–24 November	Vincenzo De Luca	PD	Centre-left	Roberto Fico	M5S	Centre-left
Veneto	23–24 November	Luca Zaia	Lega	Centre-right	Alberto Stefani	Lega	Centre-right

== Summary by region ==
=== Aosta Valley ===
Party or alliance		Votes	%	Seats
Valdostan Union (UV)		19,304	31.97	13
Centre-right coalition	Brothers of Italy (FdI)	6,634	10.99	4
Centre-right coalition	Forza Italia–LRV	6,066	10.05	4
Centre-right coalition	Lega Vallée d'Aoste (Lega)	5,062	8.38	3
Centre-right coalition	Total	17,762	29.42	11
Autonomists of the Centre (AdC)		8,483	14.05	6
Democratic Party (PD)		4,854	8.04	3
Greens and Left Alliance (AVS)		3,816	6.32	2
Open Aosta Valley (VAA)		3,359	5.56	0
Future Aosta Valley (VdAF)		2,800	4.64	0
Total		60,378	100.00	35
Valid votes		60,378	92.87	
Invalid/blank votes		4,636	7.13	
Total votes		65,014	100.00	
Registered voters/turnout		103,223	62.98	
Source: Autonomous Region of Aosta Valley – Results – ANSA

=== Marche ===
President				Regional council			
Candidate	Party	Votes	%	Alliance	Votes	%	Seats
Francesco Acquaroli	FdI	337,679	52.4	Centre-right	305,104	53.8	20
Matteo Ricci	PD	286,209	44.4	Centre-left	247,053	43.5	11
Others		20,108	3.2	Others	15,245	2.7	0
Voters: 662,883 — Turnout: 50.01%

=== Calabria ===
President				Regional council			
Candidate	Party	Votes	%	Alliance	Votes	%	Seats
Roberto Occhiuto	FI	453,926	57.3	Centre-right	440,052	58.0	21
Pasquale Tridico	M5S	330,813	41.7	Centre-left	312,214	41.1	10
Others		7,992	1.0	Others	6,738	0.9	0
Voters: 814,857 — Turnout: 43.15%

=== Tuscany ===
President				Regional council			
Candidate	Party	Votes	%	Alliance	Votes	%	Seats
Eugenio Giani	PD	752,487	53.9	Centre-left	694,092	54.6	25
Alessandro Tomasi	FdI	570,739	40.9	Centre-right	518,976	40.8	16
Others		72,321	5.2	Others	57,250	4.6	0
Voters: 1,435,329 — Turnout: 47.73%

=== Apulia ===
President				Regional council			
Candidate	Party	Votes	%	Alliance	Votes	%	Seats
Antonio Decaro	PD	919,665	64.0	Centre-left	831,315	62.6	30
Luigi Lobuono	Ind	505,055	35.1	Centre-right	488,896	36.8	21
Others		12,889	0.9	Others	8,417	0.6	0
Voters: 1,475,437 — Turnout: 41.83%

=== Campania ===
President				Regional council			
Candidate	Party	Votes	%	Alliance	Votes	%	Seats
Roberto Fico	M5S	1,286,188	60.6	Centre-left	1,229,922	61.2	33
Edmondo Cirielli	FdI	757,836	35.7	Centre-right	708,190	35.2	18
Others		77,450	3.7	Others	71,601	3.6	0
Voters: 2,193,840 — Turnout: 44.10%

=== Veneto ===
President				Regional council			
Candidate	Party	Votes	%	Alliance	Votes	%	Seats
Alberto Stefani	Lega	1,211,356	64.4	Centre-right	1,103,014	65.9	34
Giovanni Manildo	PD	543,278	28.9	Centre-left	468,796	28.0	15
Riccardo Smzuski	RV	96,474	5.1	RV	83,054	5.0	2
Others		30,164	1.6	Others	19,012	1.1	0
Voters: 1,917,577 — Turnout: 44.65%

== See also ==
- Elections in Italy
- 2025 Italian local elections
