= Progressive Civic Project =

Italian left-wing political coalition

Progressive Civic Project Progetto Civico Progressista
- Leader: Alberto Bertin
- Founded: 2020
- Dissolved: 2025
- Succeeded by: Open Aosta Valley
- Ideology: Regionalism; Social democracy Green politics
- Political position: Left-wing
- National affiliation: Greens and Left Alliance (2024)
- Regional Council of Aosta Valley: 2 / 35

The Progressive Civic Project (Progetto Civico Progressista, PCP) was a left-wing coalition of political parties active in Aosta Valley, Italy.

PCP was launched as a joint list for the 2020 regional election by three parties: the Democratic Party (PD), Green Europe (EV) and Civic Network (RC). PCP obtained 15.7% of the vote and 7 seats. After the election, a regionalist/centre-left government, composed of the Valdostan Union, the Valdostan Alliance, Edelweiss, Mouv', the PD and RC, was formed.

Within a year, the RC-led PCP broke with the government and the PD: five councillors sided with the PD and formed a new group named also "Progressive Federalists" in October 2021, while the remaining two, Erika Guichardaz and Chiara Minelli, who had resigned from regional minister in May, re-organised the PCP as the union of three groups — RC, EV and Democratic Area – Autonomist Left (AD–GA) —, and re-branded it as a left-wing opposition to the regionalist/centre-left government. Guichardaz was affiliated with AD–GA, Minelli with RC.

In the general election PCP supported Guichardaz to the Chamber and Daria Pulz to the Senate, along with the Five Star Movement, AD–GA, Environment Rights Equality (ADU) and Italian Left, the latter two already united by a federative pact. Guichardaz and Pulz obtained 10.9% and 10.0% of the vote, respectively. In February 2025, Erika Guichardaz stated that PCP "ceased to exist".
