= For Autonomy =

For Autonomy Pour l'autonomie Per l'Autonomia
- Abbreviation: PlA
- Secretary: Aldo Di Marco
- President: Cristina Camandona
- Founded: 7 August 2020
- Split from: Valdostan Union
- Ideology: Regionalism; Christian democracy
- Political position: Centre
- Regional affiliation: Autonomists of the Centre
- Colours: Black; Red; Light blue
- Slogan: «For an Autonomous and Free Aosta Valley» (Italian: «Per una Valle d'Aosta Autonoma e Libera»)
- Regional Council of Aosta Valley: 1 / 35

Website
- pourlautonomie.org

For Autonomy (French: Pour l'Autonomie, PlA) is a centrist political party active in Aosta Valley, Italy.

The party was launched in August 2020 as a split from the Valdostan Union (UV). The effort was led by Augusto Rollandin, who had formally and informally led the UV for virtually 40 years and had been President of Aosta Valley in 1984–1990 and 2008–2017, as well as senator representing the region in 2001–2006. Another leading member was Marco Carrel, a former leader of the UV's youth organisation.

In the 2020 regional election, the party won 6.4% of the vote and three seats in the Regional Council.

In June 2021, during an assembly, PlA was incorporated as a full-fledged political party; in the event Stefania Anardi and Aldo Di Marco were elected secretary and president, respectively. In March 2023, Di Marco replaced Anardi as secretary and Rollandin was elected president.

Also in March 2023, after being opposed to the government led by UV leader Erik Lavévaz, PlA joined the government led by UV's Renzo Testolin, along with the Democratic Party (PD), the Valdostan Alliance (AV), Edelweiss (SA) and Mouv', with Carrel as regional minister of Agriculture.

In January 2024 Rollandin resigned from regional councillor for health reasons and in the following May he was appointed honorary president, after being replaced as president by Cristina Camandona. In December Rollandin died.

In July 2024, rumors came out of a coalition between PlA, SA, the Valdostan Rally (RV) and the cross-party association named "Evolvendo" after they had rejected the invitation by Sovereign Aosta Country. In October, these parties alongside The Valdostan Renaissance started negotiations for a "centrist, liberal-democratic and reformist" coalition. In March 2025 PlA, SA and the RV officially launched the Autonomists of the Centre; Evolvendo and Esprì were also involved in it without being represented on the symbol.

In the 2025 regional election the list obtained 14.1% of the vote and six seats, of which three for SA and one each for PlA, the RV and Action. After the election, outgoing president Testolin of the UV, which had come first with 32.0%, formed a new government, composed also of the AdC – including SA and Action, but not PlA, while RV's Stefano Aggravi was elected president of the Council of the Valley – and Forza Italia (FI). PlA and its regional councillor, outgoing regional minister Carrel, were left outside the government coalition and formed a separate group in the minority.

== Electoral results ==
=== Italian Parliament ===
Senate of the Republic
Election	Votes	%	Seats	+/−	Candidate	Ref.
2022	7,272 (3rd)	13.4	0 / 1	0	Augusto Rollandin	

=== Regional Council of Aosta Valley ===
Election	Votes	%	Seats	+/–
2020	4,212 (6th)	6.36	3 / 35	New
2025	Into AdC		1 / 35	▼2

== Leadership ==
- Secretary: Stefania Anardi (2021–2023), Aldo Di Marco (2023–present)
- President: Aldo Di Marco (2021–2023), Augusto Rollandin (2023–2024), Cristina Camandona (2024–present)
- Honorary President: Augusto Rollandin (2024)
