= 2024 European Parliament election in Aosta Valley =

The European Parliament election of 2024 took place in Aosta Valley, as well as the rest of Italy, on 8–9 June 2024.

== Background ==
In the 2019 European Parliament election, most regionalist parties ran on the Autonomies for Europe list, only getting 14% and 6,904 votes far below the 50,000 votes needed. The largest party Valdostan Union decided to not participate in the election citing the electoral system. Two regional parties registered their symbols, Valdostan Rally (which split from the local branch of Lega and signed a deal with Freedom) and Laurent Viérin's Federalism and Autonomy list, composed of Sovereign Aosta Country and Valdostan Pride. However, after talks with Forza Italia and Italia Viva were unsuccessful, Federalism and Autonomy withdrew its candidacy.

== Results ==
Party	Votes	%
Brothers of Italy	9,704	24.30
Democratic Party	7,966	19.95
Greens and Left Alliance (incl. ADU, RC)	4,834	12.11
Lega (incl. LVd'A)	3,534	8.85
Forza Italia	3,139	7.86
Action	3,045	7.63
Valdostan Rally	2,850	7.14
Five Star Movement	1,823	4.57
United States of Europe	1,356	3.40
Peace Land Dignity	1,255	3.14
Freedom	296	0.74
Popular Alternative	125	0.31
Total	39,927	100.00
Valid votes	39,927	92.25
Invalid/blank votes	3,353	7.75
Total votes	43,280	100.00
Registered voters/turnout	101,729	42.54
Source: Ministry of the Interior
