= Tripodi =

Tripodi or Trípodi is a surname of Greek origin and, later, spread widely throughout Italy. Therefore, it can be said that it is a Greco-Roman surname. The term comes from "tripod," a word that was already recorded on one of the clay tablets found in ancient Mycenae. The tripod was a very symbolic element in Ancient Greece: it was where the pythoness sat at Delphi to express her prophecies and, furthermore, covered in gold, it was one of the prizes given to winning athletes in the Olympics.

It seems the term was introduced to Italy when Greece founded many of its colonies in southern Italy. This is why there are more Tripodi surnames in areas like Calabria and Naples than in the center or north of the country.

People with the surname include:

- Elisa Tripodi, Italian politician in the 2018 Italian general election in Aosta Valley
- Emanuel Trípodi (born 1981), Argentine football goalkeeper
- Fabio Tripodi (born 1973), Italian wheelchair curler
- Joe Tripodi (born 1967), Australian politician
- Mariano Trípodi (born 1987), Argentine footballer
- John Bruno Tripodi (born 1949),

American Fire Fighter
