= For All (Aosta Valley) =

For All (Per Tutti – Pour Tous – Pe Tcheut, PT) was a regionalist coalition of parties active in Aosta Valley, Italy.

The coalition was created in the run-up of the 2018 general election by Autonomy Liberty Participation Ecology (ALPE), Edelweiss (SA) and For Our Valley (PNV). Luisa Trione ran in the Valdostan single-seat constituency for the Senate, while Giampaolo Marcoz for the Valdostan single-seat constituency for Chamber of Deputies.

Tripodi came fourth with 15.6%, thanks to the relative popularity of the outgoing senator, Albert Lanièce of the Valdostan Union (UV), who was re-elected with 25.8% of the vote. Marcoz had a better performance with 18.3%, in an election won by Elisa Tripodi of the Five Star Movement (M5S) with 24.1%.

== Members parties ==
For the 2018 general election, the coalition was composed of the following parties:

Party	Ideology
Autonomy Liberty Participation Ecology (ALPE)	Regionalism, social democracy, green politics
Edelweiss (SA)	Regionalism, Christian democracy
For Our Valley (PNV)	Regionalism, centrism

A fourth party, Mouv', was originally part of the coalition, but ended up supporting only Marcoz for the Chamber.
