= Sovereign Aosta Country =

Sovereign Aosta Country Pays d'Aoste Souverain
- Leader: Michel-Alexandre Perret
- Founded: 2014
- Ideology: Regionalism; Separatism
- Regional Council of Aosta Valley: 0 / 35

Website
- https://paysdaostesouverain.com/

Sovereign Aosta Country (French: Pays d'Aoste Souverain, PAS) is a regionalist and separatist political party active in Aosta Valley, Italy.

The party was formed in 2014 and is currently led by Michel-Alexandre Perret.

In the 2020 regional election the party won 2.8% of the vote and no seats.

In the 2022 general election the party did not participate nor endorse any participating coalition or party. However, the party's manifesto was signed by the candidates of the Aosta Valley coalition, the centre-right coalition and The Valdostan Renaissance, thus including both elects, namely deputy Franco Manes of the Valdostan Union and senator Nicoletta Spelgatti of Lega Vallée d'Aoste.

In the run-up of the 2024 European Parliament election the party launched the candidacy of Laurent Viérin, a founding member of the Progressive Valdostan Union in 2013 and president of Aosta Valley in 2017–2018, who finally renounced. At the end, only the Valdostan Rally among regionalist parties put forward a list, obtained 7.1% of the vote, while Lega Vallée d'Aoste won 8.9% of the vote.

In the run-up of the 2025 regional election the party is trying to forge an alliance with the Valdostan Union. It later suffered a split with three members joining Renaissance. On 6 August 2025, UV and PAS signed an agreement to run together.

== Election results ==
=== Regional elections ===
Election	Votes	%	Seats	+/–
2020	1,876	2.83	0 / 35	New
2025	Into UV		0 / 35	0
