= Valdostan Rally (2023) =

Conservative political party in Aosta Valley, Italy

Valdostan Rally Rassemblement Valdôtain
- Abbreviation: RV
- Secretary: Stefano Aggravi
- President: Davide Bionaz
- Founded: September 2023
- Ideology: Regionalism; Conservatism
- Political position: Centre-right
- National affiliation: Freedom (2024)
- Regional affiliation: Autonomists of the Centre
- Regional Council of Aosta Valley: 1 / 35

Website
- rassemblementvaldotain.it

The Valdostan Rally (French: Rassemblement Valdôtain, RV) is a conservative political party in Aosta Valley, Italy.

== History ==
The party was formed in September 2023 by a group of splinters from Lega Vallée d'Aoste, including 4 out of 11 regional councillors of the party, of which they represented the conservative wing: Stefano Aggravi (leader), Dennis Brunod (deputy leader), Diego Lucianaz, and Dino Planaz. In its foundation charter, the RV aimed at "uniting Valdostans who believe in special autonomy, federalism, the preservation of our Valley's identity and traditions, the defense of individual liberties and our society's conservative values". In November 2023, the RV was organised as a full-fledged political party, with Aggravi secretary and Davide Bionaz president.

In the run-up of the 2024 European Parliament election in Italy, the party formed a pact with South calls North, a populist outfit based in Sicily, through the Freedom electoral list. Under the agreement, the party ran with its own list, but, being a party representing one of the recognised linguistic minorities, concurred with the Freedom list in overcoming the 4% countrywide threshold. In the event RV obtained 7.1% of the vote in Aosta Valley, while the combined countrywide result of Freedom and RV was 1.3%, resulting in no seats.

In July 2024, rumors came out of a coalition pact between the RV, Edelweiss (SA), For Autonomy (PlA) and the cross-party association named "Evolvendo" after they had rejected the invitation by Sovereign Aosta Country. In October, these parties alongside The Valdostan Renaissance started negotiations for a "centrist, liberal-democratic and reformist" coalition. Contextually, Claudio Restano, a long-time regional councillor and former regional minister, originally hailing from the Valdostan Union (UV), elected in 2020 from a list dominated by Mouv' and member of Evolvendo, joined the party. In March 2025 the RV, SA and PlA officially launched the Autonomists of the Centre; Evolvendo and Esprì were also involved in it without being represented on the symbol. Contextually, councillor Lucianaz left the party and would eventually join Future Aosta Valley.

In the 2025 regional election the list obtained 14.1% of the vote and six seats, of which three for SA and one each for PlA, the RV and Action.

After the election, Renzo Testolin of the UV, which had come first with 32.0%, formed a new government, composed also of the AdC – including SA and Action, but not PlA, while RV leader Aggravi was elected president of the Council of the Valley – and Forza Italia (FI).

== Election results ==
=== European Parliament ===
European Parliament
Election	Total					Aosta Valley		
Election	Votes	%	#	Seats	+/–	Votes	%	#
2024	14,457	0.06	15th	0 / 76	New	2,850	7.14	7th

=== Regional elections ===
Election	Votes	%	Seats	+/–
2025	Into AdC		1 / 35	New

== Leadership ==
- Secretary: Stefano Aggravi (2023–present)
- President: Davide Bionaz (2023–present)

== See also ==
- List of political parties in Aosta Valley
