= Autonomies and Environment Pact =

The Autonomies and Environment Pact (Italian: Patto Autonomie e Ambiente, AeA) is a centre-left network of political parties in Italy, aimining to combine regionalism and green politics. Most of its members are part of the European Free Alliance at the European level. AeA was established on 11 November 2019 and its president is Roberto Visentin, a former leader and senator of Lega Friuli–Lega Nord and founding member of the Pact for Autonomy.

== History ==
In late 2023 AV and Mouv' started a merging process into the Valdostan Union (UV). As of early AV was no longer a member of the European Free Alliance, which had been re-joined by the UV, and the AeA stated that UV could inherit AV's "founding member" status, if it joined.

In the 2024 European Parliament election, SSk sided with the South Tyrolean People's Party which itself is allied to the centre-right Forza Italia, while UV decided to not participate in the election citing the electoral system. United Romagna got a candidate on the Action list.

== Members ==
Full members

| Party | Region | Last election | | |
|---|---|---|---|---|
| Pact for Autonomy | Friuli-Venezia Giulia | 2023 | 6.2% | 5 / 48 |
| Slovene Union | Friuli-Venezia Giulia ( (Slovenia) Ethnic Slovenes) | 2023 | 1.0% | 1 / 48 |
| Valdostan Alliance (Note: Merged into Valdostan Union in 2024.) | Aosta Valley | 2020 | 8.9% (Note: In a joint list.) | 3 / 48 |
| Piedmont Free Voters | Piedmont | —N/a | | |
| Now Tuscany | Tuscany | —N/a | | |
| Pro Lombardy Independence | Lombardy | —N/a | | |
| United Romagna | Emilia-Romagna ( Romagna) | —N/a | | |
| Free Sicilians | Sicily | 2022 | 0.4% | 0 / 70 |

Observer members

| Party | Region | Last election |
|---|---|---|
| Occitan Valleys Assembly | Piedmont ( (Occitania) Occitan Valleys) | —N/a |
| Movement for the Autonomy of Romagna | Emilia-Romagna ( Romagna) | —N/a |
