= FIAT Patriarca 1100 Sport =

Fiat Patriarca 1100 Sport
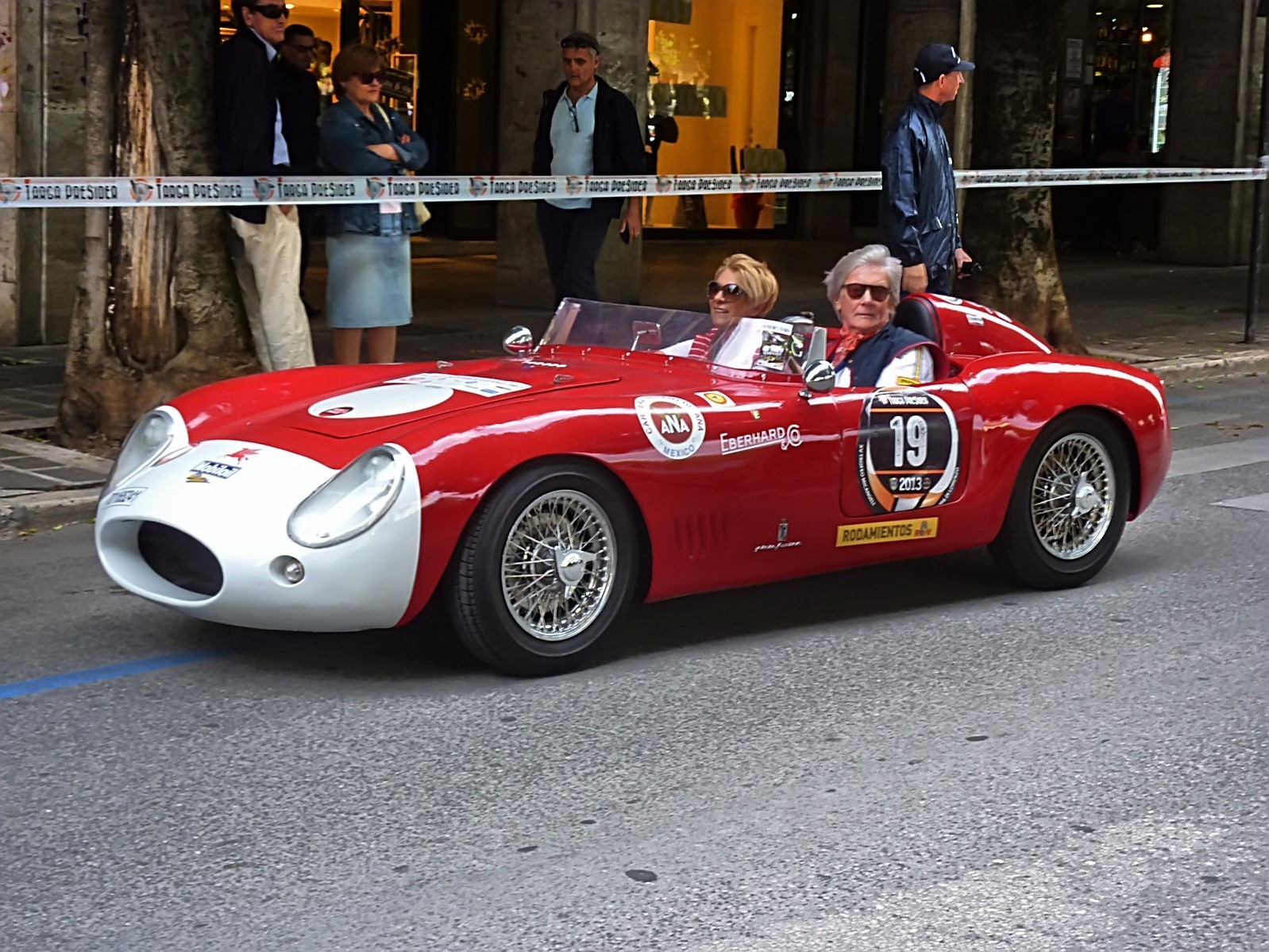

Overview
- Manufacturer: Pininfarina for Fiat
- Production: 1951

Body and chassis
- Body style: Roadster
- Layout: Front Engine, RWD
- Related: Fiat 1100 (1937)

Powertrain
- Engine: 1,089 cubic centimetres (66.5 cu in; 1.089 L) Inline 4
- Power output: 60 brake horsepower (61 PS; 45 kW) @ 7,500 rpm 74 newton-metres (55 lbf⋅ft)
- Transmission: 4-speed Manual

Dimensions
- Curb weight: 600 kilograms (1,300 lb)

Chronology
- Predecessor: Fiat S57A/14B Corsa

The 1954 Fiat Patriarca 1100 Sport was a one-off concept race car based on the Fiat 1100 chassis, constructed in 1951 by Rodolfo Patriarca for Mario Ricci for domestic race use. The aluminum bodywork was designed by Pinin Farina.

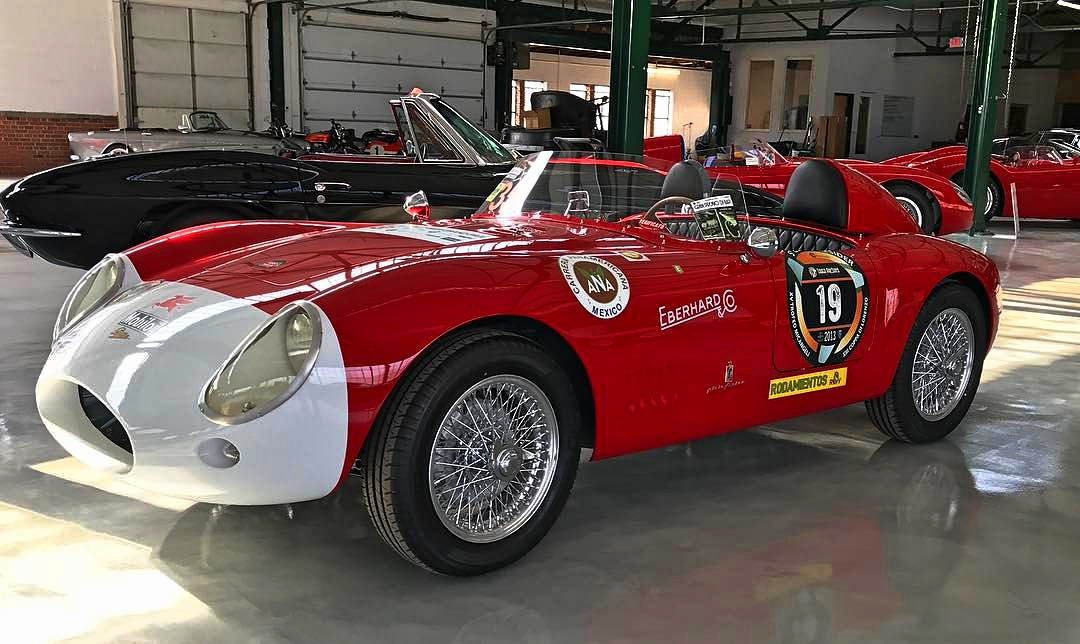

In 1954, the car was damaged while being tested; its repair was entrusted to the Morelli brothers, well-known car mechanics in Ferrara, who repaired the car and installed a new 1.1-liter Fiat motor. With its new engine, the car took part in many races, including the Coppa d'Oro on the Dolomites, the Stella Alpina, the Giro di Sicilia, the Palermo-Monte Pellegrino, and the Coppa Toscana. In 1958 the car was upgraded again in order to compete in Formula Junior single-car races. More recently, the car has raced in many classic events & city circuit races, such as the Gran Premio of Bari, the Gran Premio of Arezzo, the Circuito delle Caldaie of Ascoli-Piceno, the Targa Presider, and later the Circuito Di Avezzano.
