= Autonomist Party (disambiguation) =

The name Autonomist Party refers to any of these political parties:

- Autonomist Party, Italian-Dalmatianist Political party
- Puerto Rican Autonomist Party, Political party in Puerto Rico
- Autonomist Party of Corrientes, Argentinian political party
- Autonomist Liberal Party, Cuban political party that later changed its name to the Liberal Party of Cuba

== See also ==
- Autonomia Operaia
- Autonomists
- Autonomy
- Project of autonomy
- Autonomism (disambiguation)
