= Autonomism (disambiguation) =

Autonomism is a set of left-wing, socialist movements that first appeared in Italy in the 1970s.

Autonomism may also refer to:

- Jewish Autonomism, non-Zionist belief in the need to develop Jewish cultural identity within the Diaspora
- Autonomism (political doctrine), regionalist, separatist or secessionist movement in favour of regional autonomy within a nation or independence
  - Quebec autonomism, a form of nationalism in Quebec which advocates delegation of many higher political/federal-level powers to the province, while remaining within Canada
  - Italian autonomism espoused by the Autonomist Association and the Autonomist Party in the eastern Adriatic

== See also ==
- Autonomia Operaia
- Autonomists
- Autonomy
- Project of autonomy
- Autonomist Party (disambiguation)
