= Democratic Area – Autonomist Left =

Political party in Italy

Democratic Area – Autonomist Left Area Democratica – Gauche Autonomiste
- Leader: Raimondo Donzel; Carmela Fontana
- Founded: 2018
- Split from: Democratic Party
- Ideology: Regionalism
- Political position: Left-wing
- Regional affiliation: Open Aosta Valley
- Regional Council of Aosta Valley: 0 / 35

Democratic Area – Autonomist Left (Italian: Area Democratica, French: Gauche Autonomiste; AD–GA) is left-wing political party active in Aosta Valley, Italy.

== Background ==
AD–GA started as a faction within the regional section of the Democratic Party (PD). In the 2020 Valdostan regional election, their members ran within the Progressive Civic Project (PCP) electoral list, alongside the PD, Green Europe (EV) and Civic Network (RC). When the PD and RC joined the regionl government, the PCP splintered and ADGA's regional councillor Erika Guichardaz joined the opposition.

In the 2022 general election AD–GA ran alongside the Five Star Movement (M5S), Environment Rights Equality (ADU) and Italian Left (SI) as part of the Open Aosta Valley (VdAA) coalition, supporting Guichardaz to the Chamber and ADU's Daria Pulz to the Senate. Guichardaz and Pulz obtained 10.9% and 10.0% of the vote, respectively.

In the 2025 regional election the party was again part of VdAA, this time without SI. The list won 5.6% of the vote and no seats.

== Electoral results ==
=== Italian Parliament ===
Chamber of Deputies
Election	Votes	%	Seats	+/−	Candidate
2022	Into VdAA		0 / 1	New	Erika Guichardaz

=== Regional Council of Aosta Valley ===
Election	Votes	%	Seats	+/–
2020	Into PCP		1 / 35	New
2025	Into VdAA		0 / 35	▼1

== Leadership ==
- Coordinator: Raimondo Donzel (2018–present), Carmela Fontana (2022–present), Gianni Champion (2018–2022)
