= Grivel (company) =

Company that produces equipment for outdoor recreation

Grivel S.r.l
- Industry: Mechanics
- Founded: 1818; 208 years ago
- Headquarters: Italy, Courmayeur and Verrayes
- Products: Climbing Equipment; Climbing Gear
- Operating income: ▲€ 5 million
- Number of employees: 25 (2008)
- Website: www.grivel.com

Grivel Carbon Master tool for ice climbing

Grivel Srl is an Italian-based company that produces tools and equipment for alpinism, climbing, and outdoor activities. The company is the oldest manufacturer of tools for alpinism in existence.

The company has been certified GS TUF since 1992, ISO 9001 since 1996, ISO 1400 since 2004.

== History ==
Grivel was founded in 1818 in Courmayeur, Italy. Grivel is the surname of the original founders, in particular Henry Grivel who was succeeded by his son Laurent Grivel. It was Laurent who, in 1932, added two points to the front of mountaineering crampons, thus creating the 12 point crampon which revolutionised ice-climbing and was used throughout the rest of the 20th century.

In 1982, the company was purchased by Gioachino Gobbi and his family. The company has offices in Courmayeur and Verrayes in the Aosta Valley, and is also present in Vivaro and Chamonix.

Grivel makes the golden ice axes presented to winners of the Piolets d'Or, including the first, awarded in 1992.

The company was awarded a Compasso d'Oro design prize in 2016 for its "Twin Gate" carabiner.

In November 2024, Gioachino Gobbi, who was still acting as President of Grivel at the time, died.
