= Pact for Autonomy =

Pact for Autonomy Patto per l'Autonomia
- Leader: Sergio Cecotti
- Secretary: Massimo Moretuzzo
- President: Elisabetta Basso
- Founded: 9 October 2015
- Headquarters: Via A. Manzoni, 21; 33032 Bertiolo
- Ideology: Regionalism; Social liberalism Green politics
- National affiliation: Autonomies and Environment Pact
- European affiliation: European Free Alliance
- Chamber of Deputies: 0 / 400
- Senate: 0 / 205
- European Parliament: 0 / 76
- Regional Council of Friuli-Venezia Giulia: 2 / 48

Website
- pattoperlautonomia.eu

The Pact for Autonomy (Italian: Patto per l'Autonomia, Friulian: Pat pe Autonomie, Slovene: Pakt za Avtonomijo, German: Pakt für die Autonomie, PpA) is a regionalist and social-liberal political party in Friuli-Venezia Giulia that aims to defend the regional autonomy and protect all linguistic minorities present in the region (Friulian, German and Slovene). Its leaders have been Sergio Cecotti and Massimo Moretuzzo.

The party is a member of the European Free Alliance and of the Autonomies and Environment Pact.

== History ==
The PpA was founded as an association in 2015 and became a full-fledged party in 2017. Its founders were local administrators of Friuli-Venezia Giulia, including Massimo Moretuzzo (mayor of Mereto di Tomba) and Markus Maurmair (mayor of Valvasone Arzene), who were soon elected as the party's secretary and president, respectively. A leading role was played also by Sergio Cecotti and Roberto Visentin, both founding members of Lega Nord Friuli-Venezia Giulia, the former president of Friuli-Venezia Giulia in 1995–1996 and mayor of Udine in 1998–2008.

In the 2018 regional election, the PpA, with Cecotti as candidate for president, obtained 4.1% of the vote and two seats in the Regional Council.

In 2020, the PpA was instrumental in the formation of the Autonomies and Environment Pact, an alliance of alike regionalist parties, whose founding president was PpA's Roberto Visentin. Other members include the Valdostan Alliance and the Slovene Union.

In the 2023 regional election, Moretuzzo was the joint candidate of the autonomist / centre-left coalition: he was defeated by incumbent president Massimiliano Fedriga of Lega FVG, but the PpA won 6.3% of the vote and had four councillors elected, plus Moretuzzo.

== Election results ==
=== Regional elections ===
| Election | Leader | Votes | % | Seats | +/− |
|---|---|---|---|---|---|
| 2018 | Sergio Cecotti | 17,350 (7th) | 4.1 | 2 / 49 | – |
| 2023 | Massimo Moretuzzo | 24,838 (6th) | 6.3 | 5 / 48 | ▲3 |

== Leadership ==
- Secretary: Massimo Moretuzzo (2015–present)
- President: Markus Maurmair (2015–2022), Elisabetta Basso (2022–present)
