= Civic Commitment (Aosta Valley) =

Political party in Italy

Civic Commitment Impegno Civico
- Founded: 2018
- Dissolved: 2019
- Split from: ALPE, AltraVda
- Succeeded by: Civic Network, ADU
- Ideology: Regionalism; Social democracy Democratic socialism
- Political position: Left-wing
- Regional Council of Aosta Valley (2018): 3 / 35

Website
- www.impegnocivicovda.it/

Civic Commitment (Impegno Civico, IC) was a short-lived political party active in Aosta Valley, Italy. It was founded as Civic Response (Risposta Civica, RC).

The party was formed in the run-up of the 2018 regional election by two outgoing regional councillors, Alberto Bertin (a former member of Autonomy Liberty Participation Ecology) and Andrea Padovani (representative of "The Other Aosta Valley", connected to The Other Europe).

In the election the party obtained 7.5% of the vote and three regional councillors, Bertin, Chiara Minelli and Daria Pulz).

In January 2019 IC broke up: Bertin and Minelli launched Civic Network, while Pulz Environment Rights Equality.

== Election results ==
=== Regional elections ===
Election	Votes	%	Seats	+/–
2018	4,806	7.54	3 / 35	New
