= 2018 Italian general election in Aosta Valley =

The Italian general election of 2018 took place on 4 March 2018.

In its two single-seat constituencies, Aosta Valley elected Elisa Tripodi (Five Star Movement) to the Chamber of Deputies and re-elected Albert Lanièce (Valdostan Union, Aosta Valley coalition) to the Senate. Tripodi was the first woman to be elected from the region and the first candidate not supported by a regionalist coalition.

== Results ==
Chamber of Deputies

Candidate	Party or alliance		Votes	%
Elisa Tripodi	Five Star Movement		15,999	24.11
Alessia Favre	Aosta Valley coalition	Progressive Valdostan Union	14,429	21.74
Giampaolo Marcoz	For All coalition	Independent	12,118	18.26
Luca Distort	League		11,588	17.46
Edoardo Melgara	Centre-right (Note: Forza Italia–FdI–NVdA)	Forza Italia	5,533	8.34
Chiara Minelli	Civic Response		2,623	3.95
Francesco Rappazzo	Power to the People	Communist Refoundation Party	1,700	2.56
Lorenzo Aiello	CasaPound		1,205	1.82
Daniela Glarey	Human Value Party		1,175	1.77
Total			66,370	100.00
Valid votes			66,370	92.25
Invalid/blank votes			5,577	7.75
Total votes			71,947	100.00
Registered voters/turnout			99,547	72.27
Source: Ministry of the Interior

Senate

Candidate	Party or alliance		Votes	%
Albert Lanièce	Aosta Valley coalition	Valdostan Union	15,958	25.76
Luciano Mossa	Five Star Movement		14,398	23.25
Paolo Sammaritani	League		11,004	17.77
Luisa Trione	For All coalition	Edelweiss	9,659	15.59
Orlando Navarra	Centre-right	Forza Italia	5,223	8.43
Fabio Protasoni	Civic Response		1,911	3.09
Alexandre Glarey	Power to the People	Communist Refoundation Party	1,688	2.73
Sonny Perino	CasaPound		1,207	1.95
Annita Prezzavento	Human Value Party		890	1.44
Total			61,938	100.00
Valid votes			61,938	92.90
Invalid/blank votes			4,732	7.10
Total votes			66,670	100.00
Registered voters/turnout			92,087	72.40
Source: Ministry of the Interior
