= Autonomists of the Centre =

Italian political coalition

Autonomists of the Centre Autonomisti di Centro
- Abbreviation: AdC
- Founded: 20 March 2025
- Ideology: Regionalism; Christian democracy
- Political position: Centre
- Regional Council of Aosta Valley: 6 / 35

Website
- autonomistidicentro.it

Autonomists of the Centre (Italian: Autonomisti di Centro, AdC) is a regionalist coalition of political parties active in Aosta Valley, Italy.

== History ==
In July 2024, rumors came out of a coalition between Edelweiss (SA), For Autonomy (PlA), the Valdostan Rally (RV) and the cross-party association named "Evolvendo" after they had rejected the invitation by Sovereign Aosta Country. In October, these parties alongside Renaissance started negotiations for a "centrist, liberal-democratic and reformist" coalition.

In March 2025 SA, PlA and the RV officially launched the coalition named "Autonomists of the Centre" and its joint symbol. Evolvendo and Esprì were also involved in it without being represented on the symbol. Action later announced that Leonardo Lotto will run on their list.

In the 2025 regional election the list obtained 14.1% of the vote and six seats, of which three for SA and one each for PlA, the RV and Action.

After the election, Renzo Testolin of the Valdostan Union (UV), which had come first with 32.0%, formed a new government, composed also of the AdC – including SA and Action, but not PlA, while RV's Stefano Aggravi was elected president of the Council of the Valley – and Forza Italia (FI). PlA and its regional councillor Marco Carrel were left outside the government coalition and formed a separate group in the minority, which kept the name "Autonomists of the Centre", while the other five councillors re-named their group as "Autonomist Centre".

== Member parties ==
Party	Ideology
Edelweiss (SA)	Christian democracy
For Autonomy (PlA)	Christian democracy
Valdostan Rally (RV)	Conservatism

Other affiliates

Party	Ideology
Action	Liberalism
Esprì	Social liberalism
Evolvendo (è)	Regionalism

== Election results ==
=== Regional elections ===
Election	Votes	%	Seats	+/–
2025	8,483	14.05	6 / 35	New
