= Future Aosta Valley =

Future Aosta Valley Valle d'Aosta Futura
- Abbreviation: VdA Futura
- Leader: Manuela Careri
- Founded: 2020
- Ideology: Populism; Anti-establishment; Regionalism
- Political position: Big tent
- Regional Council of Aosta Valley: 0 / 35

Website
- Official website

Future Aosta Valley (Italian: Valle d'Aosta Futura, VdAF) is a political party in Aosta Valley, Italy.

== History ==
The party was launched in July 2020 and its first leader was entrepreneur Edoardo Artari.

In the 2020 regional election the party obtained 2.7% of the vote and no seats; its most voted candidate was Edoardo Artari.

In the run-up of the 2025 regional election the party, led by Manuela Careri since 2023, re-branded itself as a protest party, espousing an autonomist outlook and vaccine hesitancy. It was also joined by Diego Lucianaz, a Valdostan separatist who had been a founding member and a regional councillor of Lega Vallée d'Aoste and, later, of the Valdostan Rally. In the election, the party obtained 4.6% of the vote (+1.9 pp) and no seats; its most voted candidates were Diego Luciananz, Adriana Viérin, Andrea Desandré and Manuela Careri.

== Election results ==
=== Regional elections ===
Election	Votes	%	Seats	+/–
2020	1,761	2.66	0 / 35	New
2025	2,800	4.64	0 / 35	0

== Leadership ==
- President: Manuela Careri
- Vice President: Adriana Viérin

== See also ==
- List of political parties in Aosta Valley
