= Roberto Visentin =

Italian politician (born 1953)

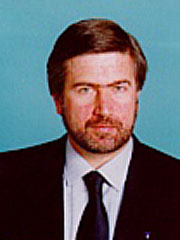
Roberto Visentin

Roberto Visentin (born 30 October 1953) is an Italian politician from Friuli-Venezia Giulia devoted to Friulian nationalism and green politics.

In 1990 Visentin, who had been a member of the Friuli Movement, was a founding member of Lega Nord Friuli, of which he served as secretary until 1999. Visentin was first elected to the Chamber of Deputies in the 1992 general election and was later elected to the Senate in the 1994 and 1996 general elections.

In 2001 Visentin left the party and became one of its strongest critics.

In 2015–2017 Visentin was one of the founding members of the Pact for Autonomy, a centre-left regionalist party. In 2020 he was instrumental in the formation of the Autonomies and Environment Pact, a network of regionalist and green political parties, and became its president. He also serves as vice president of the European Free Alliance.
