= Aosta Valley (Chamber of Deputies constituency) =

Italian electoral district

- Chamber of Deputies; Electoral constituency
- Region: Aosta Valley
- Electorate: 98,187 (2018)
- Major settlements: Aosta

Current constituency
- Created: 1946
- Seats: 1
- Member: VdA (1)

Aosta Valley is one of the 29 constituencies (Italian: circoscrizioni) represented in the Chamber of Deputies, the lower house of the Italian parliament. The constituency currently elects only one deputy, less than any other in the parliament. Its boundaries correspond to those of the Italian region of Aosta Valley. The electoral system in Aosta Valley uses a first-past-the-post election, with one round of voting.

The constituency was first established in 1946, with the legislative decree n. 74, for the election of the Constituent Assembly of Italy and later confirmed by the Mattarella law on 4 August 1993, by the Calderoli law on 21 December 2005 and by the Rosato law on 3 November 2017.

== Members of the Parliament ==
=== 2022–current ===
Single-member district
District			Deputy	Party
N.	Name	Map	Deputy	Party
01	Aosta Valley		Franco Manes	Aosta Valley

=== 2018–2022 ===
Single-member district
District			Deputy	Party
N.	Name	Map	Deputy	Party
01	Aosta Valley		Elisa Tripodi	Five Star Movement
