= Franco Manes =

Italian politician (born 1963)

Member of the Chamber of Deputies
- Incumbent
- Assumed office 13 October 2022
- Constituency: Aosta Valley

Mayor of Doues
- In office 24 May 2010 – 7 October 2022
- Preceded by: Eugenio Isabel
- Succeeded by: Giorgio Abram

Personal details
- Born: 21 June 1963 (age 63) Aosta, Italy
- Party: Aosta Valley
- Education: University of Turin
- Profession: Architect
- Website: website

Franco Manes (born 21 June 1963) is an Italian politician. He has been a member of the Chamber of Deputies of the Italian Parliament since the 2022 Italian general election.

== Biography ==
Manes was born in Aosta and lives in Doues. After graduating as a surveyor in 1988, he graduated in Architecture from the University of Turin. He currently practices as an architect.

Manes was married to Pia Maria Giovanna Bonfant and has two children.

== Political career ==
In 1990 he began his political career as a municipal councilor and assessor of Doues for a centrist civic list, being reconfirmed in 1995, 2000 and 2005.

In the 2010 local elections he was elected mayor of Doues unopposed with a turnout of 82.01%. He was then re-elected, again without challengers, in the 2015 and 2020 elections.

Since 2015 he has been president of the Permanent Council of Local Authorities (CPEL) and of the Consortium of Local Authorities (CELVA) of the Aosta Valley.

In the 2022 Italian general election, he ran for the Chamber of Deputies in the single-member constituency of Aosta Valley as an independent candidate for the autonomist-progressive coalition Vallée d'Aoste - Autonomie Progrès Fédéralisme (comprising Valdostan Union, Valdostan Alliance, Vallée d'Aoste Unie, Edelweiss, Democratic Party and Action – Italia Viva), being elected with 38.63% of the vote, ahead of Emily Marinella Rini of the centre-right (29.80%) and Giovanni Girardini of La Reinassance Valdôtaine (11.90%). He therefore resigned as mayor of Doues; Giorgio Abram replaced him.

== See also ==
- List of members of the Chamber of Deputies of Italy, 2022–present
