= Edelweiss (political party) =

Political party in Aosta Valley, Italy

Edelweiss Stella Alpina
- Secretary: Ronny Bobey
- President: Luisa Trione
- Founded: 25 November 2001
- Preceded by: Autonomists
- Headquarters: Via Monte Pasubio, 40; 11100 Aosta
- Ideology: Regionalism; Christian democracy
- Political position: Centre
- Regional affiliation: Autonomists of the Centre
- Chamber of Deputies: 0 / 400
- Senate: 0 / 200
- European Parliament: 0 / 76
- Regional Council of Aosta Valley: 3 / 35

Website
- www.stella-alpina.org

Edelweiss (Italian: Stella Alpina, SA) is a regionalist, Christian-democratic political party active in Aosta Valley, Italy.

The party's founder and longest-serving leader was Maurizio Martin. Currently, it is led by Ronny Bobey and Luisa Trione. Leading members have included Rudi Marguerettaz (party secretary in 2001–2013 and member of the Chamber of Deputies in 2013–2018), Pierluigi Marquis (President of Aosta Valley in 2017, later switched to another party) and Carlo Marzi (party secretary since 2016 and regional minister since 2020).

== History ==
=== Early years ===
SA was founded in 2001 by the merger of the Autonomists and the Autonomist Federation (FA). The Autonomists originated in the Valdostan section of the Italian People's Party, one of the successors of Christian Democracy, while the FA was formed by former Progressive Democratic Autonomists as well as former Socialists and Republicans. In the 2003 Valdostan regional election, SA received 19.8% of the vote and seven regional councillors. In the 2003–2008 term, the party controlled five seats in the Regional Council. Of the five regional councillors, four were former members of Christian Democracy and one was a former Republican. In 2004, the FA re-gained its independence from SA.

From 2001 to 2006, SA was represented in the Chamber of Deputies by Ivo Collé, elected on the Aosta Valley coalition (VdA) ticket, formed also by the Valdostan Union (UV) and the Autonomist Federation (FA). In the 2006 general election, SA's Marco Viérin ran for the Chamber, but the VdA coalition was soundly defeated by the centre-left Autonomy Liberty Democracy (ALD) list.

=== The regionalist coalition ===
In the 2008 regional election, SA, which included some candidates of the Union of the Centre (UdC) in its list, won 11.4% of the vote and four regional councillors (out of 35), while the three-party regionalist coalition won 62.0% and a large majority, composed of 22 regional councillors.

In the 2013 general election, Rudi Marguerettaz, secretary of SA since 2001, was elected to the Chamber. Soon after the election, Marguerettaz chose to team up with Lega Nord (LN) and became vice president of the "Lega Nord and Autonomies" parliamentary group. Consequently, Marguerettaz stepped down from secretary and the party was led by a provisional executive. In March 2015, Marguerettaz would break ranks with LN and join the "Linguistic Minorities" sub-group within the Mixed Group, formed by the South Tyrolean People's Party (SVP) and the Trentino Tyrolean Autonomist Party (PATT).

For the 2013 regional election, the party confirmed its alliance with the UV and SA, and formed a joint list with Lega Nord Vallée d'Aoste (LNVdA). In an election in which the UV lost a quarter of its votes and FA its entire representation in the Regional Council, SA increased its share of vote to 12.2% and its number of regional councillors to five. Thanks to SA's result, the regionalist coalition retained its absolute majority in the Council. In July 2015, the regional government, led by UV's Augusto Rollandin, was enlarged to the centre-left Democratic Party (PD), and in June 2016 by the Progressive Valdostan Union (UVP).

=== Recent events ===
In May 2016, Carlo Marzi was elected secretary of the party, three years after Marguerettaz's resignation from the office.

In March 2017, SA left the government and, along with the UVP, Autonomy Liberty Participation Ecology (ALPE) and For Our Valley (PNV), formed a new government without the UV, under President Pierluigi Marquis (SA), including another SA member, Stefano Borrello, as minister of Public Works. This led two regional councillors, Mauro Baccega and André Lanièce, to quit the party and launch the Valdostan Autonomist Popular Edelweiss (EPAV). Marquis' government lasted only until October 2017, when a new government led by Laurent Viérin (UVP), composed of the UV, the UVP, the EPAV and the PD, was formed.

In the 2018 general election, SA took part within the For All alliance, along with ALPE and PNV, but the list was defeated in both races (Chamber and Senate).

In the 2018 regional election, SA formed a joint list with PNV; the list obtained 10.7% and four seats (two for SA and two for PNV). After the election, the Regional Council elected Nicoletta Spelgatti of LNVdA as President, at the head of a broad left-right coalition, comprising SA–PNV, ALPE, Mouv' and one defector from UV's ranks. In the new government Borrello was confirmed as minister of Public Works, along with PNV's Claudio Restano at Tourism, Sports, Commerce and Transports. However, in December the government fell down and was replaced by a new one led by Antonio Fosson (PNV), at the head of a coalition composed of the UV, the UVP, ALPE, SA and PNV. Under Fosson, Borrello was again appointed minister of Public Works. In December 2019 Fosson resigned from President and was replaced by his Vice President, UV's Renzo Testolin, as acting president, with Borrello retaining his post as minister.

In the 2020 regional election, the party won 8.9% of the vote; this was in a joint list with the Valdostan Alliance (AV), a brand new party formed by the merger of the UVP and ALPE. The list obtained four seats: two for SA (Marquis and Marzi), one for former UVP member Luigi Bertschy and one for former ALPE member Albert Chatrian. After the election, SA joined a regionalist/centre-left government led by UV's Erik Lavévaz and composed of the UV, the Democratic Party (PD), Civic Network (RC), AV and Mouv'. Marzi, who continued to serve as party's secretary, was appointed minister of Finances, Innovation, Public Works and Land issues, while AV's Bertschy was appointed Vice President, as well as minister of Economic Development, Formation and Labour. AV and SA soon broke, with the former joining forces with United Aosta Valley, mainly comprising Mouv'. In April 2022, the party was left with only one regional councillor, after Marquis switched to Forza Italia. In November 2022, during a party congress, SA elected its new leadership, notably including a new secretary, Ronny Bobey, and a new president, Luisa Trione. In March 2023, AV joined a new government led by UV's Testolin, which, differently from Lavévaz's, comprised also For Autonomy (PlA).

In July 2024, rumors came out of a coalition between SA, PlA, the Valdostan Rally (RV) and the cross-party association named "Evolvendo" after they had rejected the invitation by Sovereign Aosta Country. In October, these parties alongside The Valdostan Renaissance started negotiations for a "centrist, liberal-democratic and reformist" coalition. In March 2025 SA, PlA and the RV officially launched the Autonomists of the Centre; Evolvendo and Esprì were also involved in it without being represented on the symbol.

In the 2025 regional election the list obtained 14.1% of the vote and six seats, of which three for SA and one each for PlA, the RV and Action. After the election, outgoing president Testolin of the UV, which had come first with 32.0%, formed a new government, composed also of the AdC – including SA and Action, but not PlA, while RV's Stefano Aggravi was elected president of the Council of the Valley – and Forza Italia (FI), with Marzi as regional minister of Health and Social Policies.

== Electoral results ==
=== Regional elections ===
Election	Votes	%	Seats	+/–
2003	14,817	19.83	7 / 35	New
2008	8,370	11.39	4 / 35	▼3
2013	8,824	12.25	5 / 35	▲1
2018 (Note: In a joint list with For Our Valley.)	6,792	10.66	2 / 35	▼3
2020 (Note: In a joint list with Valdostan Alliance and Italia Viva.)	5,880	8.87	2 / 35	0
2025	Into AdC		3 / 35	▲1

== Leadership ==
- Secretary: Rudi Marguerettaz (2001–2013), Carlo Marzi (2016–2022), Ronny Bobey (2022–present)
- President: Maurizio Martin (2001–2022), Luida Trione (2022–present)
