= Civic Network =

Political party in Italy

Civic Network Rete Civica Alliance Citoyenne
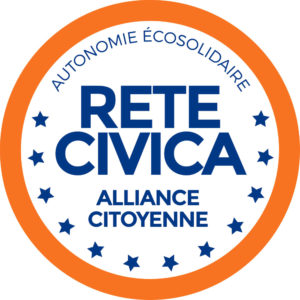
- Leader: Elio Riccarand
- Founded: 2019
- Split from: Civic Commitment
- Ideology: Regionalism; Social democracy Green politics
- Political position: Left-wing
- National affiliation: Greens and Left Alliance
- Regional affiliation: Progressive Civic Project
- Regional Council of Aosta Valley: 3 / 35

Website
- https://retecivicavda.eu/

Civic Network (Rete Civica, RC) is a left-wing political party active in Aosta Valley, Italy.

== History ==
The party was formed in January 2019 upon the break-up of Civic Commitment (IC), an alike grouping which had obtained 7.5% of the vote and three regional councillors in the 2018 regional election. The more moderate wing, including regional councillors Alberto Bertin (a former member of Autonomy Liberty Participation Ecology) and Chiara Minelli (a long-time independent municipal councillor in Fontainemore), launched RC, while the more radical wing, led by regional councillor Daria Pulz, formed Environment Rights Equality (ADU).

In June 2019, when the regional government led by Antonio Fosson of For Our Valley was in crisis, RC became part of the governing majority.

In the 2020 regional election, the RC was part of a centre-left joint list, named Progressive Civic Project (PCP), comprising the Democratic Party (PD) and Green Europe (EV). The list obtained 15.7% of the vote and 7 seats, two of which for RC. After the election, a regionalist/centre-left government, composed of the Valdostan Union, the Valdostan Alliance, Edelweiss, Mouv', the PD and RC. Bertin was elected President of the Regional Council, while Minelli was appointed regional minister of the environment, transports and sustainable mobility.

Within a year, the RC-led PCP broke with the government and the PD: five councillors, including Bertin, sided with the PD and formed a new group named also "Progressive Federalists" in October 2021, while the remaining two, Erika Guichardaz and Minelli, who had resigned from regional minister in May, re-organised the PCP as the union of three groups — RC, EV and Democratic Area – Autonomist Left (AD–GA) —, and re-branded it as a left-wing opposition to the regionalist/centre-left government. Guichardaz was affiliated with AD–GA.

In the 2022 general election, RC decided not to endorse Guichardaz to the Chamber and Daria Pulz to the Senate, nominated by ADU-sponsored Open Aosta Valley (VdAA); instead pushing for a united progressive platform.

In the 2024 European Parliament election, RC ran with the Greens and Left Alliance (AVS), including EV, Italian Left and, regionally, ADU.

In April 2025, after the collapse of PCP, RC announced that it would run with AVS in the 2025 regional election. In the election, AVS obtained 6.3% of the vote and three seats, including one for Minelli, while VdAA stopped at 5.6% and had no seats.

== Election results ==
=== European Parliament ===
Election	Leader	Votes	%	Seats	+/–	EP Group
2024	Elio Riccarand	Into AVS		0 / 76	New	–

=== Regional elections ===
Election	Votes	%	Seats	+/–
2020	Into PCP		2 / 35	New
2025	Into AVS		3 / 35	▲1

== Leadership ==
- Coordinator: Fabio Protasoni (2019–2023), Elio Riccarand (2023–present)
