= Open Aosta Valley =

Italian political parties

Open Aosta Valley Valle d'Aosta Aperta
- Abbreviation: VdA Aperta
- Leader: Erika Guichardaz
- Founded: 2022
- Split from: Progressive Civic Project
- Ideology: Democratic socialism Eco-socialism; Progressivism; Regionalism
- Political position: Left-wing
- Regional Council of Aosta Valley: 0 / 35

Website
- https://www.vdaaperta.it/

Open Aosta Valley (Italian: Valle d'Aosta Aperta) is a left-wing regionalist coalition of political parties active in Aosta Valley, Italy.

== History ==
In the 2022 general election, Five Star Movement, Democratic Area – Autonomist Left (AD–GA), Environment Rights Equality (ADU) and Italian Left (SI) formed Open VdA and nominated Erika Guichardaz (AD-GA) for the Chamber and Daria Pulz (ADU) for the Senate. ADU and SI already united by a federative pact. Guichardaz and Pulz obtained 10.9% and 10.0% of the vote, respectively.

In December 2024, Open VdA announced its intention to run on a joint list for the 2025 regional election. In February 2025, Guichardaz stated that Progressive Civic Project "ceased to exist" and excluded running on a list which goes from Civic Network, via Power to the People to Legambiente. On 22 April 2025, Civic Network announced that will run with Italian Left as Greens and Left Alliance. Socialist Risorgimento and Communist Refoundation Party joined Open VdA the same day.

== Member parties ==
| Party | | Ideology |
|---|---|---|
| Democratic Area – Autonomist Left (AD–GA) | | Social democracy |
| Five Star Movement (M5S) | | Populism |
| Environment Rights Equality (ADU) | | Eco-socialism |
| United on the left | Communist Refoundation Party | Communism |
| United on the left | Risorgimento Socialista | Communism |

=== Former ===
| Party | Ideology |
|---|---|
| Italian Left (SI) | Democratic socialism |

== Electoral results ==
=== Italian Parliament ===
Chamber of Deputies
| Election | Votes | % | Seats | +/− | Candidate |
| 2022 | 5,841 (4th) | 10.87 | 0 / 1 | New | Erika Guichardaz |

Senate of the Republic
| Election | Votes | % | Seats | +/− | Candidate |
| 2022 | 5,448 (4th) | 10.02 | 0 / 1 | New | Daria Pulz |

=== Regional elections ===
| Election | Votes | % | Seats | +/– |
|---|---|---|---|---|
| 2025 | 3,359 (8th) | 5.56 | 0 / 35 | New |
