= Environment Rights Equality =

Environment Rights Equality Ambiente Diritti Uguaglianza
- Leader: Carola Carpinello; Alex Glarey; Daria Pulz
- Founded: 2019
- Split from: Civic Commitment
- Ideology: Regionalism
- Political position: Left-wing
- Regional affiliation: Open Aosta Valley
- Regional Council of Aosta Valley: 0 / 35

Environment Rights Equality (Italian: Ambiente Diritti Uguaglianza, ADU) is a left-wing political party in Aosta Valley, Italy. The party seeks to represent the "social and political left", that is "anti-liberist and anti-capitalist, environmentalist, feminist, secular, pacifist, libertarian, anti-racist and anti-fascist".

== History ==
ADU emerged in 2019 from the left-wing split of Civic Commitment, which had obtained 7.5% of the vote and three seats in the 2018 regional election. The party's early leader was Daria Pulz, who had directed the Historical Institute of Resistance and Contemporary Society in Aosta Valley before entering into politics and being elected to the Regional Council.

In the 2020 regional election the party was excluded from the ballot for technical reasons.

In the 2022 general election the party was a founding member of Open Aosta Valley (VdAA), along with Democratic Area – Autonomist Left (AD–GA), the Five Star Movement (M5S) and Italian Left (SI), the latter forming a federative pact with ADU. The coalition obtained 10.9% of the vote for the Chamber of Deputies, with AD–GA's Erika Guichardaz as candidate, and 10.0% of the vote for the Senate, with Daria Pulz as candidate. Later, SI broke with ADU and established the Greens and Left Alliance also in Aosta Valley.

In the 2025 regional election VdAA, composed of ADU, AD–GA and M5S, obtained 5.6% of the vote and no seats; Guichardaz and Pulz were the most voted candidates.

== Electoral results ==
=== Italian Parliament ===
Senate of the Republic
Election	Votes	%	Seats	+/−	Candidate
2022	Into VdAA		0 / 1	New	Daria Pulz

=== European Parliament ===
Election	Leader	Votes	%	Seats	+/–	EP Group
2024	Carola Carpinello; Alex Glarey; Daria Pulz	Into AVS		0 / 76	New	–

=== Regional Council of Aosta Valley ===
Election	Votes	%	Seats	+/–
2025	Into VdAA		0 / 35	New

== Leadership ==
- Secretariat: Carola Carpinello, Alex Glarey, Daria Pulz
- Coordination: Beatrice Feder, Chiara Giordano

== See also ==
- List of political parties in Aosta Valley
