= Alessandro Giglio Vigna =

Italian politician (born 1980)

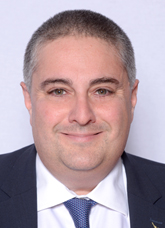
- Giglio Vigna in 2022

Member of the Chamber of Deputies
- Incumbent
- Assumed office 23 March 2018
- Constituency: Piedmont 1 – 02 (2018–2022); Piedmont 1 – 04 (2022–present)

Personal details
- Born: 13 December 1980 (age 45)
- Party: Lega

Alessandro Giglio Vigna (born 13 December 1980) is an Italian politician serving as a member of the Chamber of Deputies since 2018. He has served as chairman of the EU affairs committee since 2022.

== Biography ==
In the 2004 local elections, he ran as a candidate for the Lega Nord in the Ivrea district for a seat on the Turin Provincial Council, but was not elected.

In the 2006 general election, he ran for the Chamber of Deputies in the Piedmont 1 (Chamber of Deputies constituency) as a candidate for the Northern League, but was not elected.

He served as a city council member in Orio Canavese from 2007 to 2008.

In the 2008 general election, he ran again for the Chamber of Deputies in the Piedmont 1 (Chamber of Deputies constituency) as a candidate for the Northern League, but was not elected.

In the 2008 local elections, he ran for mayor of Ivrea as a candidate for the Northern League, receiving 5.42% of the vote and winning a seat on the city council, a position he held until 2013.

In the 2018 general election, he was elected to the Chamber of Deputies as a member of the Lega (political party) in the Piedmont 1 - 02 multi-member constituency. Since 2018, he has been a member of the Parliamentary Commission for the Implementation of Fiscal Federalism, and since 2019, of the 14th Commission (European Union Policies).

In the 2022 general election, he was nominated again by the center-right coalition and elected in the single-member constituency of Piedmont 1 - 04 (Chieri) with 47.15% of the vote, defeating Antonella Giordano of the center-left (27.61%) and Antonino Iaria of the Five Star Movement (10.39%).

In the municipal elections held in Ivrea on May 14 and 15, 2023, the League failed to win a single seat on the city council, despite the presence of several outgoing council members and department heads; according to some analyses, Vigna himself is also blamed for the poor election results.
