= Autonomist People's Alliance =

Political party

The Autonomist People's Alliance (Alleanza Popolare Autonomista, APA) was a social-democratic Italian political party active in Aosta Valley.

It was founded in 1992 by a split from the regional Italian Socialist Party. Its leading members were Edoardo Bich, Giovanni Aloisi and Bruno Milanesio. In the 1993 regional election the party won 4.0% of the vote and got elected two regional deputies. In 1998 the party was merged with the Progressive Democratic Autonomists into the Autonomist Federation. Afterwards Enrico Bich, son of Edoardo, and Bruno Milanesio started another social-democratic party named Alé Vallée.
