= Mouv' (political party) =

Movement Mouv'
- President: Damien Charrance
- Founded: 2017
- Dissolved: June 16, 2024
- Split from: Progressive Valdostan Union
- Merged into: Valdostan Union
- Succeeded by: Esprì (faction)
- Headquarters: Via F. Chabod 68, Aosta
- Ideology: Regionalism; Federalism; Autonomism; Social liberalism

Website
- www.mouv-vda.it

The original logo of Mouv' from 2017 to 2020

Mouv' (lit. 'Movement'), officially United Aosta Valley – Mouv' (French: Vallée d'Aoste Unie–Mouv'), was a progressive political party active in Aosta Valley, Italy. The party was launched in March 2017 as a split from the Progressive Valdostan Union (UVP).

== History ==
In June 2016, the UVP joined the regional government led by Augusto Rollandin of the Valdostan Union (UV), fueling rumors of a re-unification with the UV. The move was opposed by Luciano Caveri and Claudio Brédy, who left the party in protest. In August, Elso Gérandin also left the UVP. On 26 January 2017, Caveri, Brédy and Gérandin founded the "movement of opinion" Mouv', which would be later joined by Andrea Rosset and two dissident regional councillors of the Five Star Movement (M5S). In the constituent assembly of 24 February 2018, Mouv' became a political party. On 1 March 2018, Mauro Caniggia Nicolotti was elected as coordinator of the party.

In the 2018 regional election, the party obtained 7.1% of the vote and three regional councillors: Gérandin, Roberto Cognetta and Stefano Ferrero (Rosset came fourth, thus failing re-election). After the election, the Regional Council elected Nicoletta Spelgatti of Lega Nord Valle d'Aosta (LNVdA) as president, at the head of a broad left-right coalition, comprising Edelweiss–For Our Valley (SA–PNV), Autonomy Liberty Participation Ecology (ALPE), Mouv' and one defector from UV's ranks. In the new government, Gérandin was appointed vice president and minister of Agriculture and the Environment. In December, the government was replaced by a new one led by Antonio Fosson (PNV)and including the UV, the UVP, ALPE, SA and PNV.

In the 2020 regional election, the Mouv', along with minor allies within the "United Aosta Valley" (VdAU) list, won 8.1% of the vote and three regional councillors, notably including Caveri. After the election, the party joined a regionalist/centre-left government led by UV's Erik Lavévaz and composed of the UV, the Democratic Party (PD), Civic Network (RC), the Valdostan Alliance (AV) — formed by the merger of ALPE and UVP —, and SA. Caveri was appointed minister of Education, university, Youth Policies, European Affairs and Public Participations.

In October 2021, Damien Charrance was elected as president of Mouv' and the faction around Gerandin was excluded from the party's regional board. Also in October, the Mouv', through "United Aosta Valley", joined forces with AV in the Regional Council. Only two regional councillors out of three, Caveri and Corrado Jordan joined the new joint group, named "Valdostan Alliance – United Aosta Valley": Claudio Restano, representing PNV, refused to join. Additionally, Gerandin and his allies left the party in opposition to the formation of the new joint group. In 2022, another group splintered from Mouv', led by Mauro Caniggia called Esprì, that supported Renaissance valdotaine during the 2022 elections.

In 2023, Mouv' joined a new government led by UV's Renzo Testolin, which, differently from Lavévaz's, comprised also For Autonomy (PlA). In late 2023, Mouv' and AV started a merging process into the UV. In June 2024, at an extraordinary congress of the UV, the reunion was finally approved.

== Election results ==
=== Regional elections ===
Election	Votes	%	Seats	+/–
2018	4,545	7.13	3 / 35	New
2020	5,397	8.14	3 / 35	0

== Leadership ==
- President: Mauro Caniggia Nicolotti (2018–2019), Massimiliano Pegorari (2019–2021), Damien Charrance (2021–2024)
