= Verrayes =

Verrayes Vèèi (Valdôtain)
- Comune
- Comune di Verrayes; Commune de Verrayes
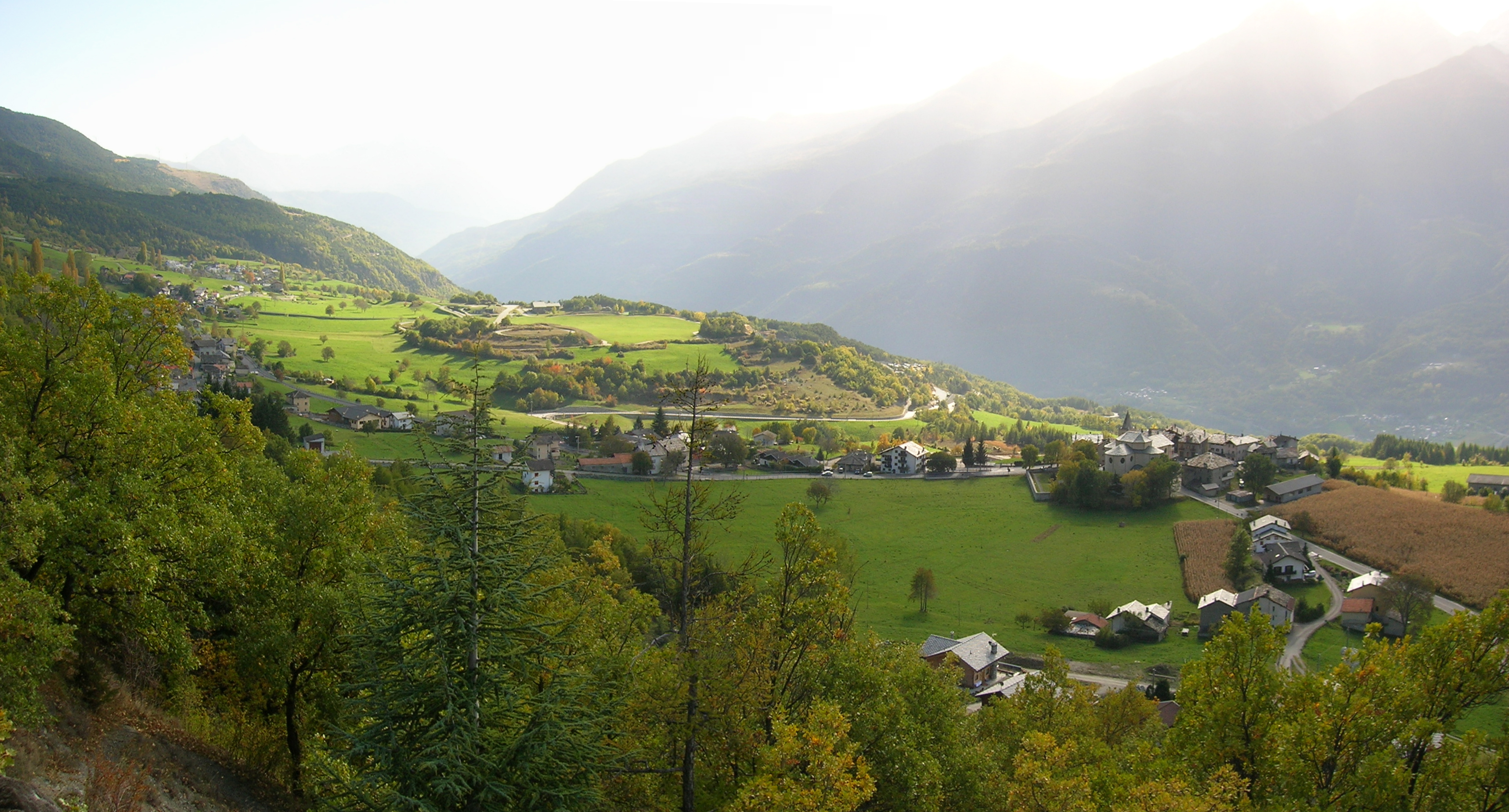
- Panorama of Verrayes

- Coat of arms

- Location within Italy Location within Aosta Valley
- Coordinates: 45°46′N 7°32′E
- Country: Italy
- Region: Aosta Valley
- Province: none
- Frazioni: Aver, Champoaz, Charrère, Chérésoulaz, Chérolinaz, Chesseillé, Cort, Crétaz, Diémoz, Dorinaz, Frayé, Grand-Ville, Gros-Ollian, Grossaix, Grumey, Guet, Heré, Hers, Lauzon, Marseiller, Mont-de-Join, Moulin, Oley, Ollières, Pallu, Payé, Petit-Ollian, Pignane, Pissine, Plan-d'Arey, Plan-de-Vesan, Plan-de-Verrayes, Promeillan, Rapy, Vencorère, Vervot, Vieille, Voisinal, Vrignier
  - Mayor: (Wanda Chapellu)

Area
  - Total: 22 km^{2} (8.5 sq mi)
- Elevation: 1,017 m (3,337 ft)

Population (31 December 2022)
  - Total: 1,293
  - Density: 59/km^{2} (150/sq mi)
- Demonym: Verrayons
- Time zone: UTC+1 (CET)
  - Summer (DST): UTC+2 (CEST)
- Postal code: 11020
- Dialing code: 0166
- ISTAT code: 007072
- Website: Official website

Verrayes (French: [veʁɛj]; Valdôtain: Vèèi) is a town and comune in the Aosta Valley region of north-western Italy.
