= Esprì =

- President: Mauro Caniggia
- Founders: Mauro Caniggia, Jean-Claude Daudry, Rossana Scapoli, Émile Gorret, Roberto Luboz
- Founded: September 29, 2022
- Split from: Mouv'
- Youth wing: Esprì Jeunes
- Ideology: Regionalism; French-speaking minority interests Social liberalism
- Political position: Centre-left
- Regional affiliation: Autonomists of the Centre

Esprì (Valdôtain for "spirit") is a political party in the Italian region of Aosta Valley. The party was formed from a split in the Mouv' party, due to its impending merger into Valdostan Union.

== History ==
The party announced its registration as a political party on September 29, 2022, submitting the proper forms and paperwork. Esprì has been vocally opposed to the "Reunion" project, which is the merger of various autonomist parties into the Valdostan Union. The party was founded and led by Mauro Caniggia, a former candidate and executive of Mouv' alongside Jean-Claude Daudry, Rossana Scapoli, Émile Gorret and Roberto Luboz as a reformist autonomist party. Caniggia stated he left Mouv' because the rest of the party's leadership wasn't listening to his proposals, and because he was "saddened" with the direction the party was going, and claiming the rhetoric of the party was too heightened.

The stated goals of the party is to promote individualism, social liberalism, with a focus on increasing housing and the standard of living in the Aosta Valley. The party is pro-European, and supports Aosta Valley being given its own seat in the European Parliament instead of competing in the North-West constituency.

Esprì supported the candidacy of Giovanni Girardini and have cooperated with his Valdostan Renaissance during the 2022 elections. The party was founded as the other mainstream autonomist parties where joining into the Aosta Valley coalition. The party described themselves as "moderates" with a "moderate approach." It supports the Autonomists of the Centre coalition in the 2025 regional election.

The party's youth organization, Esprì Jeunes (French for "young") held its first rally on October 14, 2023.
