= Elisa Tripodi =

Italian politician (born 1986)

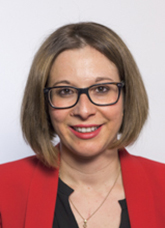

Member of the Chamber of Deputies
- In office 23 March 2018 – 13 October 2022
- Constituency: Aosta Valley

Personal details
- Born: 1 August 1986 (age 40) Aosta, Italy
- Party: Five Star Movement
- Profession: Insurance consultant
- Website: website

Elisa Tripodi (born 1 August 1986) is an Italian politician from the Five Star Movement. She was a member of the Chamber of Deputies of the Italian Parliament from 2018 to 2022. She was elected in 2018 in Aosta Valley, becoming the regions first female parliamentarian. She is an insurance consultant by profession.

== See also ==
- List of members of the Chamber of Deputies of Italy, 2018–2022
