= Autonomist Federation =

Autonomist Federation Fédération Autonomiste
- Historical leaders: Cristina Vasini; Leonardo La Torre; Claudio Lavoyer
- Founded: 1998
- Dissolved: 2014
- Merger of: ADP, APA
- Merged into: UV
- Headquarters: 50, rue de Chambéry; 11100 Aosta/Aoste
- Ideology: Christian democracy Social liberalism Social democracy
- Political position: Centre
- Regional coalition: Aosta Valley coalition

Website
- www.federationautonomiste.org (Archived)

The Autonomist Federation (French: Fédération Autonomiste, FA) was a regionalist, centrist, Italian political party active in Aosta Valley. Social-liberal and social-democratic, the party's ideology lately tilted toward Christian democracy. The party's last leader was Claudio Lavoyer, a long-time regional councillor and former regional minister.

== History ==
The party was founded in 1998 by the merger of the Progressive Democratic Autonomists, which included several splinters of the Italian Republican Party, and the Autonomist People's Alliance, basically formed by former members of the Italian Socialist Party. In the 1998 regional election the party list, which also included some members of the Christian Democratic Centre and the United Christian Democrats, obtained 9.7% of the vote and four regional councillors.

In the 2001 the FA was merged with the Autonomists into Edelweiss (SA). In the 2003 regional election SA was the second-largest party with 19.8% of the vote, but the party soon split and the FA re-gained its autonomy in 2004.

In the 2008 regional election the party, which was part of the winning regionalist coalition, obtained 6.2% of the vote and two regional councillors (out of 35). Claudio Lavoyer was appointed to the regional government. In 2009 a group of Socialists, members of the Socialist Party at the national level, were expelled from the FA. In 2013 a larger group of Socialists, led by Leonardo La Torre, a former leader of the party, left and joined the Valdostan Union.

In the 2013 regional election the FA, which included the Union of Christian and Centre Democrats, obtained a mere 2.2% of the vote and was excluded from the Regional Council, after 15 years of continuous presence. As a result, Lavoyer resigned from party leader. In 2014 the party was merged into a short-lived outfit named "Create VdA", which was finally merged into the UV, of which La Torre was still a regional councillor.

== Leadership ==
- Secretary: unknown (1998–2001), Cristina Vasini (2003–2008), Leonardo La Torre (2008–2012), Claudio Lavoyer (2012–2013)
- President: unknown (1998–2001), Guglielmo Piccolo (2003–2008), Cristina Vasini (2008–2014)
