= Valdostan Alliance =

Valdostan Alliance Alliance valdôtaine
- Abbreviation: AV
- Coordinator: Albert Chatrian
- Founded: 2019
- Dissolved: June 16, 2024
- Merger of: UVP, ALPE
- Merged into: Valdostan Union
- Headquarters: Via/Rue de Chambéry 51, 11100 Aosta
- Ideology: Regionalism; Progressivism; Green politics Social liberalism
- Political position: Centre-left
- National affiliation: AeA
- European affiliation: EFA

Website
- Official website

The Valdostan Alliance (French: Alliance valdôtaine, AV) was a regionalist and progressive political party active in Aosta Valley, Italy.

The party was formed in 2019 by the merger of the Progressive Valdostan Union (UVP) and Autonomy Liberty Participation Ecology (ALPE). AV was soon involved in the Autonomies and Environment Pact (AeA) and the European Free Alliance (EFA).

In the 2020 regional election, the party, in a joint list with Edelweiss (SA), obtained 8.9% of the vote and four seats: two for SA, one for UVP's Luigi Bertschy and one for ALPE's Albert Chatrian. After the election, the AV joined a regionalist/centre-left government led by Erik Lavévaz of the Valdostan Union (UV), comprising the UV, the Democratic Party (PD), Civic Network (RC), SA and Mouv'. Bertschy was appointed Vice President as well as minister of Economic Development, Formation and Labour, while SA's Carlo Marzi was minister of Finances, Innovation, Public Works and Land issues. AV and SA soon broke, with the former joining forces with United Aosta Valley, mainly comprising Mouv'.

In 2023, AV joined a new government led by UV's Renzo Testolin, which, differently from Lavévaz's, comprised also For Autonomy (PlA).

In late 2023, AV and Mouv' started a merging process into the UV. As of early AV was no longer a member of the European Free Alliance, which had been re-joined by the UV, and the AeA stated that UV would inherit AV's "founding member" status, if it joined. In June 2024, at an extraordinary congress of the UV, the reunion was finally approved.

== Election results ==
=== Regional elections ===
Election	Votes	%	Seats	+/–
2020 (Note: In a joint list with Edelweiss and Italia Viva.)	5,880	8.87	2 / 35	New

== Leadership ==
- Coordinator: Corrado Cometto (2019–2020), Albert Chatrian (2020–2024)
