= 2020 Valdostan regional election =

Italian regional election

- 20–21 September 2020
- All 35 seats to the Regional Council of Aosta Valley
- Turnout: 70.5% (▲5.4%)
Party	Leader	Vote %	Seats	+/–
Lega VdA	Marialice Boldi	23.9%	11	+4
UV	Erik Lavévaz	15.8%	7	0
PCP	Alberto Bertin	15.3%	7	+5
AV	Luigi Bertschy	8.9%	4	−6
VdAU	Corrado Jordan	8.1%	3	0
PlA	Augusto Rollandin	6.4%	3	New
This lists parties that won seats. See the complete results below.
President before	President after
Renzo Testolin; UV	Erik Lavévaz; UV

The 2020 Valdostan regional election took place on 20 and 21 September 2020 in Aosta Valley, Italy. The election was originally scheduled to take place on 19 April 2020, but was then postponed first to 10 May and then delayed for a second time due to the coronavirus pandemic in Italy.

== Electoral law ==
The Regional Council of Aosta Valley (Italian: Consiglio regionale della Valle d'Aosta, French: Conseil de la Vallée) is composed by 35 members. The Council is elected for a five-year term. There is only one regional constituency. The President of Aosta Valley is elected by the Council. The electoral law was recently changed by the L.R. 16/2017 and the L.R. 9/2019.

The election of the Regional Council is based on a direct choice for the candidate and it is possible to express only one preference for the list. If a single party list or a coalition of party lists gets more than 42% of valid votes cast, it is assigned a majority bonus of 21 seats. If no one reach this threshold, the seats are determined proportionally. For the proportional allocation there are two thresholds: given the largest remainder method by dividing the valid votes cast for all lists and the seats to be assigned, if a party list doesn't reach the minimum quota required, the party list is excluded to the allocation of the seats. However, if a party list gets only one seat during the first allocation of seats, it is excluded and its seat is reallocated.

== Background ==
Aosta Valley returned to the vote earlier than the deadline by decision of the interim president Renzo Testolin, following investigations into the infiltration of the 'Ndrangheta in the politics of the region at all levels. Former president Antonio Fosson was investigated for electoral exchange between the political and mafia. The same accusation is directed at two former assessors of his government, Laurent Viérin (former president) and Stefano Borrello. Two other former presidents – Pierluigi Marquis and Augusto Rollandin – were also seeking the support of the local clans who infiltrated the Valley, according to the prosecutor's office.

== Parties and candidates ==
The following parties participated in the election:

Party	Main ideology	Seats
Valdostan Alliance (UVP–ALPE) – Edelweiss – Italia Viva	Progressivism	10
Lega Vallée d'Aoste (incl. Young Aosta Valley)	Right-wing populism	7
Valdostan Union	Regionalism	5
Five Star Movement	Populism	4
United Aosta Valley (incl. Mouv', Together)	Progressivism	3
Progressive Civic Project (PD – RC – EV) (incl. AD, Pos)	Social democracy, Green politics	2
Free Aosta Valley – Animalist Party	Regionalism, Animal rights	2
Centre-right Aosta Valley (FI – FdI) (incl. NVdA, PNV)	Liberal conservatism, National conservatism	1
Renaissance Aosta Valley	Liberalism	0
For Autonomy	Regionalism	0
Future Aosta Valley	Populism	0
Sovereign Aosta Country	Regionalism	0

== Results ==
2020 Valdostan regional election results
Parties	Votes	%	Seats
Lega Vallée d'Aoste	15,837	23.90	11
Valdostan Union	10,470	15.80	7
Progressive Civic Project	10,106	15.25	7
Valdostan Alliance – Edelweiss – Italia Viva	5,880	8.87	4
United Aosta Valley	5,397	8.14	3
For Autonomy	4,212	6.36	3
Forza Italia – Brothers of Italy	3,761	5.68	0
Renaissance Aosta Valley	3,289	4.98	0
Five Star Movement	2,589	3.91	0
Sovereign Aosta Country	1,876	2.83	0
Future Aosta Valley	1,761	2.66	0
Free Aosta Valley – Animalist Party	1,084	1.64	0
Valid votes	66,283	91.17	–
Blank votes	2,642	3.63	–
Invalid votes	3,777	5.20	–
Total	72,702	100.00	35
Registered voters/turnout	103,127	70.50	–
Source: Autonomous Region of Aosta Valley – Results

=== Popular vote by list ===
Popular vote
Lega	23.90%
UV	15.80%
PCP	15.25%
AV–SA–IV	8.87%
VdAU	8.14%
Pl'A	6.36%
CDVdA	5.68%
Rin.	4.98%
M5S	3.91%
PAS	2.83%
VdAF	2.66%
VDA LIBRA–PAI	1.64%

=== Turnout ===
Region	Time			
Region	20 Sep			21 Sep
Region	12:00	19:00	23:00	15:00
Aosta Valley	17.66%	42.68%	54.16%	70.50%
Source: Aosta Valley Region – Turnout

== Aftermath ==
After the election, a centre-left/regionalist coalition government was formed. It was headed by Erik Lavévaz, leader of the Valdostan Union (UV), and composed of three UV members (President and two ministers), three from the "Progressive Civic Project" and one each from the Valdostan Union, Edelweiss and Mouv'.

== See also ==
- 2020 Italian regional elections
