= The Valdostan Renaissance =

The Valdostan Renaissance La Renaissance Valdôtaine
- President: Giovanni Girardini
- Secretary: Roberta Carla Balbis
- Founded: 2020
- Headquarters: Viale Conte Crotti / Avenue comte Crotti, 3 Aosta
- Ideology: Regionalism; Autonomism
- Political position: Centre
- Regional Council of Aosta Valley: 1 / 35

Website
- Official website

The Valdostan Renaissance (French: La Renaissance Valdôtaine, LRV) is a political party active in Aosta Valley, Italy.

== History ==
The party was formed in 2020, as the local branch of Renaissance, under the name of Renaissance Aosta Valley (Italian: Rinascimento Valle d'Aosta).

In the 2020 municipal election in Aosta the party won 25.7% of the vote and four seats, while party leader Giovanni Girardini ran for mayor, being defeated with 46.7% of the vote in the run-off. In the 2020 Valdostan regional election the party won 5.0% of the vote and no seats.

In May 2022 the party held its first congress, during which it changed its name to The Valdostan Renaissance.

In the 2022 general election Girardini ran for the Chamber of Deputies, winning 11.9% of the vote.

In May 2024 the party's assembly confirmed Girardini as president. Later that year, LRV, Edelweiss, the Valdostan Rally, For Autonomy and minor groups started negotiations for a "centrist, liberal-democratic and reformist" coalition, but, finally, LRV opted to join the regional centre-right coalition instead.

In the 2025 Valdostan regional election the party ran in a joint list with Forza Italia (FI), obtaining 10.0% of the vote and four regional councillors, including LRV's Eleonora Baccini. In the concurring 2025 municipal election in Aosta Girardini ran again for mayor, with the support of the entire centre-right coalition, being narrowly defeated in the run-off. After the elections, FI joined the new regional government led by Renzo Testolin of the Valdostan Union (UV), while LRV did not. After that, LRV formed a separate group in the Council of the Valley.

== Electoral results ==
=== Italian Parliament ===
Chamber of Deputies
Election	Votes	%	Seats	+/−	Candidate	Ref.
2022	6,398 (3rd)	11.90	0 / 1	New	Giovanni Girardini	

=== Regional Council of Aosta Valley ===
Election	Votes	%	Seats	+/–
2020	3,289	5.0	0 / 35	New
2025	with Forza Italia		1 / 35	▲1
