= Autonomists =

The Autonomists (French: Autonomistes; Italian: Autonomisti) were a Christian-democratic Italian political party active in the Aosta Valley.

The party was founded in 1997 by the union of the regional Italian People's Party with For Aosta Valley, and some former Socialists. In the 1998 regional election Autonomists won 12.8% and five regional deputies. In 2001 the party was merged with the Autonomist Federation (FA) to form the current Edelweiss (SA). However, following the 2003 regional election FA was re-established and thus SA can be considered the perfect continuation of the Autonomists.
