= 2022 Italian general election in Aosta Valley =

- 25 September 2022
	First party
Leader	Franco Manes
Party	UV
Seats before	0
Seats won	1
Seat change	▲1
Popular vote	20,763
Percentage	38.63%
Swing	▲16.93

The 2022 Italian general election took place on 25 September 2022. In its two single-seat constituencies, Aosta Valley elected Franco Manes (Valdostan Union within the Aosta Valley coalition) to the Chamber of Deputies and Nicoletta Spelgatti (Lega Vallée d'Aoste within the centre-right coalition) to the Senate of the Republic. Spelgatti, a former president of Aosta Valley, was the first Valdostan woman elected to the Senate.

== Results ==
Chamber of Deputies

Candidate	Party or alliance		Votes	%
Franco Manes	VdA–CSX	UV	20,763	38.63
Emily Rini	CDX	FI	16,016	29.80
Giovanni Girardini	none	LRV	6,398	11.90
Erika Guichardaz	Open VdA (Note: Five Star Movement (M5S), Democratic Area – Autonomist Left (AD–GA), Environment Rights Equality (ADU), and Italian Left (SI))	AD–GA	5,841	10.87
Loredana Ronc	ISP	TBA	2,302	4.28
Loredana De Rosa	UP	TBA	1,375	2.56
Davide Ianni	none	PCI	1,051	1.96
Total			53,746	100.00
Valid votes			53,746	90.34
Invalid/blank votes			5,744	9.66
Total votes			59,490	100.00
Registered voters/turnout			98,187	60.59

Senate

Candidate	Party or alliance		Votes	%
Nicoletta Spelgatti	CDX	Lega	18,509	34.05
Patrik Vesan	VdA–CSX	PD	18,282	33.63
Augusto Rollandin	none	PlA	7,272	13.38
Daria Pulz	Open VdA	ADU	5,448	10.02
Alessandro Bichini	ISP	TBA	1,569	2.89
Francesco Lucat	UP	PRC	1,311	2.41
Guglielmo Leray	none	PCI	1,051	1.93
Larisa Bargan	Vita	TBA	917	1.69
Total			54,359	100.00
Valid votes			54,359	91.38
Invalid/blank votes			5,131	8.62
Total votes			59,490	100.00
Registered voters/turnout			98,187	60.59

== See also ==
- 2022 Italian general election in Trentino-Alto Adige/Südtirol
- Results of the 2022 Italian general election
