= Renaissance (Italian political party) =

Renaissance Rinascimento
- President: Vittorio Sgarbi
- Founded: 17 January 2017
- Headquarters: Corso Diaz 192, Forlì
- Ideology: Protection of cultural heritage Cultural conservatism
- Political position: Centre-right
- National affiliation: Electoral list: Us Moderates; Coalition: Centre-right coalition
- Colours: Azure
- Chamber of Deputies: 0 / 400
- Senate: 0 / 200
- European Parliament: 0 / 76
- Regional Councils: 0 / 896

Renaissance (Italian: Rinascimento) is a political party in Italy. Its leader is Vittorio Sgarbi, an Italian art critic, art historian, politician, cultural commentator and television personality. Sgarbi was formerly a member of the Italian Liberal Party, which was elected in Parliament in 1992, and after its dissolution in 1994 joined in Forza Italia, continuing to be MP until 2006.

The party's aim is to increase the investments in culture, which is considered the main resource for Italy.

== History ==
The party was founded by Vittorio Sgarbi on 17 January 2017, but just a year later, on 19 January 2018, he also joined Forza Italia, thus remaining leader of the party. However, the party (in a joint list with Moderates in Revolution) ran its candidates in the 2018 Italian general election in the constituency of Friuli-Venezia Giulia, gaining a few hundred votes (less than 0.1% for both the Chamber of Deputies and the Senate).

On 23 March 2022 the party merged with the anti-lockdown association of entrepreneurs led by Umberto Carriera and changed its name to I Open Renaissance (Io Apro Rinascimento).

In the 2022 election, Sgarbi ran in the single-member district of Bologna, losing against the centre-left candidate, Pier Ferdinando Casini. However, the centre-right coalition won the election and Sgarbi was appointed undersecretary to the Ministry of Culture.

Its Valdostan wing The Valdostan Renaissance became a regional party.

== Election results ==
=== Italian Parliament ===
Election	Leader	Chamber of Deputies					Senate of the Republic				
Election	Leader	Votes	%	Seats	+/–	Position	Votes	%	Seats	+/–	Position
2018	Vittorio Sgarbi	with FI	–	1 / 630	New	5th	with FI	–	0 / 315	New	5th
2022	Vittorio Sgarbi	with NM	–	0 / 400	▼1	12th	with NM	–	0 / 200	0	13th

=== European Parliament ===
Election	Leader	Votes	%	Seats	+/–	EP Group
2024	Vittorio Sgarbi	Into FdI		0 / 76	New	–
