= Regional Council of Aosta Valley =

Legislative organ of Aosta Valley, Italy

Regional Council of Aosta Valley Conseil de la Vallée Consiglio regionale della Valle d'Aosta
- 17th Legislature

Type
- Type: Regional council Unicameral

History
- Founded: 29 December 1945

Leadership
- President: Stefano Aggravi, AdC, RV since 5 November 2025

Structure
- Seats: 35
- Political groups: Government (20): UV (12); AdC (5); FI (3); Opposition (15): FdI (4); Lega (3); PD (3); AVS (3); Pl'A (1); LRV (1)
- Length of term: 5 years

Elections
- Voting system: Party-list proportional representation with majority bonus
- Last election: 28 September 2025
- Next election: September 2030

Meeting place
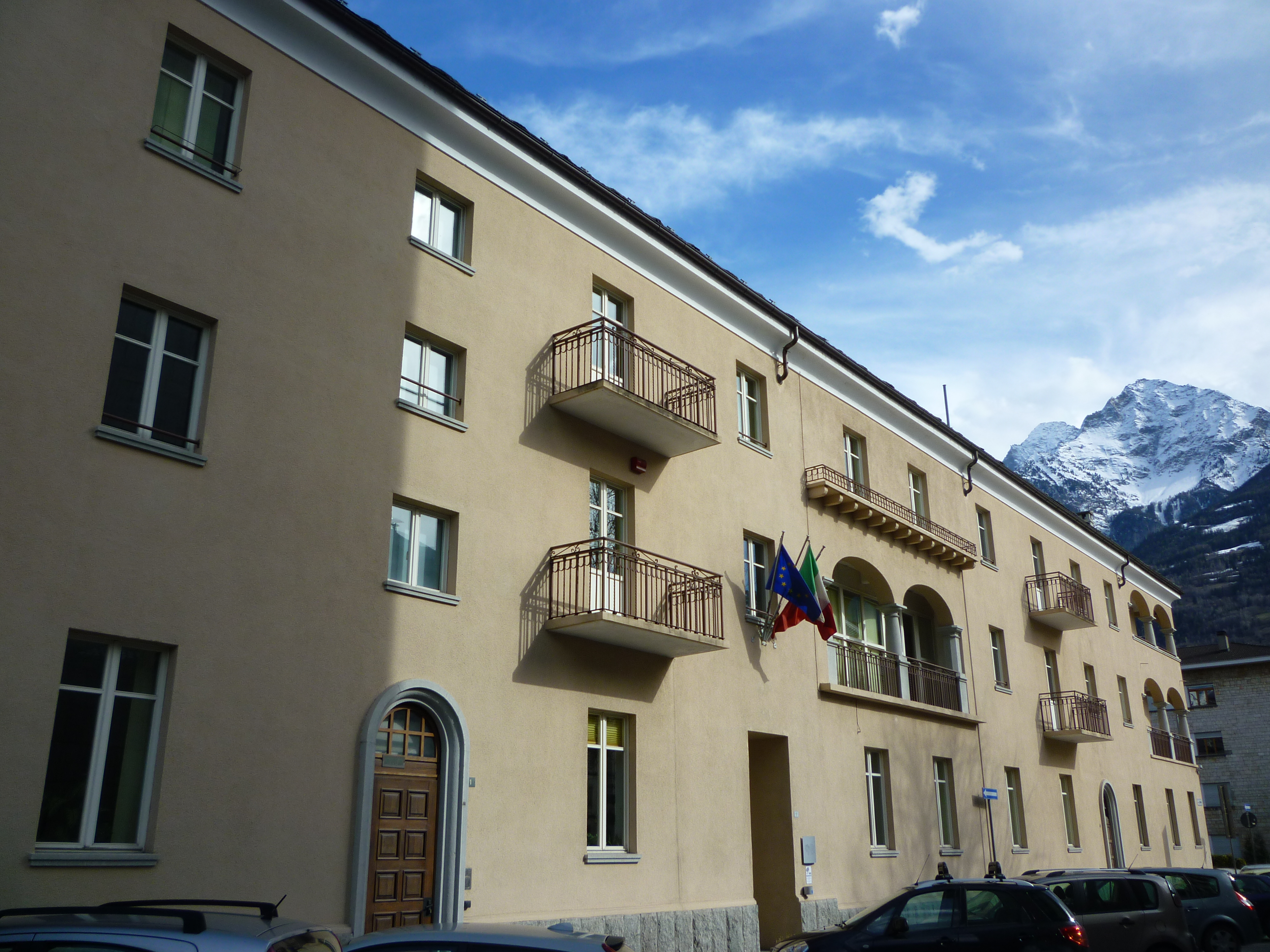
- Rue du Piave 1, Aosta

Website
- consiglio.vda.it

The Regional Council of Aosta Valley (French: Conseil de la Vallée; Italian: Consiglio Regionale della Valle d'Aosta) is the legislative assembly of the autonomous region of Aosta Valley.

The Council was founded on 29 December 1945 and its first members were selected by the central directions of the parties and approved by the Council of Ministers. The first election of the Council were held instead on 24 April 1949.

== Composition ==
The Regional Council of Aosta Valley is composed by 35 members. The Council is elected for a five-year term. There is only one regional constituency. The President of Aosta Valley is elected by the Council. The electoral law was changed by the L.R. 16/2017 and the L.R. 9/2019.

The election of the Regional Council is based on a direct choice for the candidate and it is possible to express only one preference for the list. If a single party list or a coalition of party lists gets more than 42% of valid votes cast, it is assigned a majority bonus of 21 seats. If no one reaches this threshold, the seats are determined proportionally. For the proportional allocation there are two thresholds: given the largest remainder method by dividing the valid votes cast for all lists and the seats to be assigned, if a party list doesn't reach the minimum quota required, the party list is excluded to the allocation of the seats. However, if a party list gets only one seat during the first allocation of seats, it is excluded and its seat is reallocated.

=== Political groups ===
The XVII legislature of the Regional Council is composed as follows:

Party	Seats	Status
Valdostan Union (UV)	12 / 35	In government
Autonomists of the Centre (AdC)	5 / 35	In government
Brothers of Italy (FdI)	4 / 35	In opposition
Forza Italia (FI)	3 / 35	In government
League Aosta Valley (Lega)	3 / 35	In opposition
Democratic Party (PD)	3 / 35	In opposition
Greens and Left Alliance (AVS)	3 / 35	In opposition
For Autonomy (Pl'A)	1 / 35	In opposition
The Valdostan Renaissance (LRV)	1 / 35	In opposition

=== Historical composition ===
Election	DC	UV	PCI	PSI	PSDI	PLI	PRI	PD	MSI	DP (Note: As "Nuova Sinistra" and Proletarian Democracy.)	Others	Total
24 April 1949	28		7									35
16 November 1954	25	1	9									35
17 May 1959	10	25										35
27 October 1963	13	7	9	2	1	2	-	-	-	-	1	35
21 April 1968	13	6	7	4		2	-	-	-	1 (Note: As PSIUP.)	2	35
10 June 1973	7	4	7	3	1	1	-	8	1	-	3	35
25 June 1978	7	9	7	1	1	1	1	4	-	1	3	35
26 June 1983	7	9	6	3	1	1	1	4	1	1	1	35
26 June 1988	7	12	5	3	-	-	1	4	1	1	1	35
30 May 1993	5	13	3 (Note: As PDS.)	1	-	-	2		-	3 (Note: As Alternative Greens.)	8	35

Election	UV	GV (Note: As "Gauche Valdotaine" (GV) and Democrats of the Left / Democratic Party (DS/PD).)	AVdA	FI	SA	FA	VdAV–R	Total
31 May 1998	17	3	3 (Note: As PVAcU.)	3	5 (Note: As Autonomists.)	4	-	35
8 June 2003	18	4	3	3	7		-	35
25 May 2008	17	5	–	4 (Note: As PdL.)	4	2	5	35

Election	UV	PD	RC	Lega	SA	ALPE	UVP	M5S	Others	Total
26 May 2013	13	3	-	5		5	7	2	-	35
20 May 2018	7	-	3	7	4	3	4	4	3	35
20 September 2020	7	7		11	4			-	6	35
28 September 2025	13	3	2 (Note: As AVS.)	3	6 (Note: As AdC.)	-	-	-	8	35

== See also ==
- Regional council
- Politics of Aosta Valley
- President of Aosta Valley
