= Lega Vallée d'Aoste =

- Secretary: Marialice Boldi
- Founded: 1991
- Ideology: Regionalism; Federalism; Populism
- National affiliation: Lega Nord (1991–2020); Lega per Salvini Premier (2020–present)
- Chamber of Deputies: 0 / 630
- Senate: 0 / 315
- European Parliament: 0 / 73
- Regional Council of Aosta Valley: 3 / 35

Website
- https://www.legasalvinipremiervda.it

Previous flag of Lega Nord Vallée d'Aoste

Lega Vallée d'Aoste (English: Aosta Valley League), whose complete name is Lega Vallée d'Aoste per Salvini Premier (English: Aosta Valley League for Salvini Premier), is a regionalist political party active in Aosta Valley. The party, initially called Lega Nord Vallée d'Aoste (English: Northern League Aosta Valley) was a "national" section of Lega Nord (LN) from 1991 to 2020 and became the regional section of Lega per Salvini Premier (LSP) in Aosta Valley in 2020.

The party was established in 1991 by a group of former associates of Roberto Gremmo in the Autonomist Union.

== Recent history ==
In the 2008 regional election the party originally fielded candidates, but finally supported from the outside the winning centre-right regionalist coalition composed of Valdostan Union (UV), Edelweiss (SA) and Autonomist Federation (FA). LNVdA had particularly good relations with the latter.

In the 2013 general election the candidates of LNVdA garnered 3.3% in the race for the Chamber of Deputies' seat and 3.9% in the Senate race. However, after the election, the elected deputy, Rudi Marguerettaz of SA, decided to join the group of Lega Nord in the Chamber. It was the first time ever that a deputy in the group of Lega Nord came from Aosta Valley.

In the 2013 regional election the party reinforced its alliance with SA (and, through SA, with the UV–SA–FA regionalist coalition), under which two LNVdA candidates (Nicoletta Spelgatti and Zeudi Zoso) were included in the SA list. The joint list obtained 12.2% of the vote and 5 elects to the Regional Council, but none of LNVdA.

In 2015 Marguerettaz broke with the party. However, the LNVdA started to grow in membership and popular support.

In the 2018 general election the candidates of LNVdA garnered 17.5% in the race for the Chamber of Deputies' seat and 17.8%% in the Senate race, paving the way for a return into the Regional Council.

In the 2018 regional election the party, whose list was led by Spelgatti, obtained 17.1% of the vote and seven seats. After the election, the Regional Council elected Spelgatti as President, at the head of a broad left-right coalition, comprising Edelweiss–For Our Valley (SA–PNV), Autonomy Liberty Participation Ecology (ALPE), Mouv' and one defector from UV's ranks. The government proved short-lived: in December it fell down and was replaced by a new one led by Antonio Fosson (PNV), at the head of a coalition composed of the Valdostan Union (UV), the Progressive Valdostan Union (UVP), ALPE and SA.

In the 2019 European Parliament election the LNVdA won 37.2% of the vote.

Following the formation of Lega per Salvini Premier and the 2019 federal congress of the LN, after which the latter became practically inactive, in February 2020 the LNVdA was re-established as Lega Vallée d'Aoste per Salvini Premier in order to become the regional section of the new party. The founding members of the new LVdA were Spelgatti, Marialice Boldi and Paolo Sammaritani.

In the 2020 regional election the party increased its tally from 2018 to 23.9%, but was excluded from the regional government as most of the other parties, led by the UV, formed an alternative centre-left/regionalist majority. In 2023 the party suffered the split of the Valdostan Rally (RV).

== Popular support ==
The party has never achieved a popular support comparable to the main national sections of the LN, due to the presence and electoral strength of other regionalist parties, notably including the Valdostan Union, Edelweiss, the Autonomist Federation and the Progressive Valdostan Union. The electoral results of Lega Nord Valle d'Aosta in Aosta Valley are shown in the table below.

1992 general	1993 regional	1994 general	1996 general	1998 regional	1999 European	2001 general	2003 regional	2004 European	2006 general	2008 general	2008 regional
-	7.6	17.1	8.1	3.4	1.9	with FI	with FI	2.9	2.0	3.1	-

2009 European	2013 general	2013 regional	2014 European	2018 general	2018 regional	2019 European	2020 regional	2022 general	2024 European	2025 regional
4.4	3.3	with SA	6.8	17.5	17.1	37.2	23.9	with FI–FdI	8.9	8.4

== Leadership ==
- Secretary: Paolo Linty (1991–1998), Giuseppe Henriet (1998–2001), Nicolao Negroni (2002–2006), Sergio Ferrero (2006–2017), Alessandro Giglio Vigna (commissioner 2017–2019), Marialice Boldi (2020–present, commissioner 2019–2023)
- President: Giuseppe Henriet (1991–1998), Aldo Meinardi (1998–2010), Giuseppina Foderà (2010), Dario Piacenza (2010–2014), Nicoletta Spelgatti (2014–2017)
