= Erik Lavévaz =

Italian politician

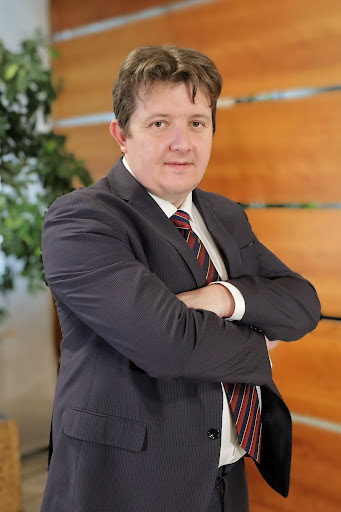

President of Aosta Valley
- In office 21 October 2020 – 25 January 2023
- Preceded by: Antonio Fosson; Renzo Testolin (ad interim)
- Succeeded by: Renzo Testolin

Personal details
- Born: 15 February 1980 (age 46) Aosta, Italy
- Party: Union valdôtaine
- Education: University of Turin
- Occupation: Entrepreneur

Erik Lavévaz (born 15 February 1980) is an Italian politician and entrepreneur. He became the president of Aosta Valley on 21 October 2020, after being president of Valdostan Union since 2018 and mayor of Verrayes from 2005 to 2019.
