= Greens and Left Alliance =

Greens and Left Alliance Alleanza Verdi e Sinistra
- Abbreviation: AVS
- Leaders: Angelo Bonelli; Nicola Fratoianni
- Founded: 2 July 2022
- Ideology: Democratic socialism Green politics
- Political position: Left-wing
- National affiliation: Centre-left coalition
- European affiliation: EGP (EV); ELA (SI); NTP (SI)
- European Parliament group: The Left; Greens/EFA
- Chamber of Deputies: 9 / 400
- Senate: 3 / 205
- European Parliament: 6 / 76
- Regional Councils: 29 / 897

Website
- verdisinistra.it

The Greens and Left Alliance (Italian: Alleanza Verdi e Sinistra, AVS) is a left-wing political alliance active in Italy, which was launched on 2 July 2022 as a federation of two political parties, Italian Left (SI) and Green Europe (EV). AVS is often referred to as a red–green alliance and its leaders are Angelo Bonelli and Nicola Fratoianni, spokespersons of EV and SI.

== History ==
In January 2022, Italian Left (SI) and Green Europe (EV) formed a "consultation pact", aimed at co-operating on the 2022 Italian presidential election held in late January. In that context, the two parties decided to jointly support Luigi Manconi, an expert on human rights issues and former lawmaker for the Federation of the Greens, the Democrats of the Left, and the Democratic Party (PD). In June 2022, SI's national assembly formally approved the alliance with EV, which did the same in its federal assembly.

In July 2022, SI and EV held a joint convention in Rome named "New Energies", promoting their cooperation and a unitary electoral program. The alliance deliberately took inspiration from the New Ecological and Social People's Union, the left-wing list formed in the run-up of the 2022 French legislative election. Following the fall of Mario Draghi's government, a national unity government that was not supported by SI and EV, the early dissolution of Parliament and the calling of the 2022 Italian general election, AVS was officially launched and its logo presented.

In August 2022, AVS formalised an electoral agreement with the PD. In the election, it won 3.6% of the vote. In February 2024, Massimiliano Smeriglio, a member of the European Parliament (MEP) elected with the PD, switched to AVS. In May Rosa D'Amato, a MEP elected with the Five Star Movement, joined AVS. In the following 2024 European Parliament election AVS had its first real electoral breakthrough with 6.8% of the vote and six MEPs elected. They included Ilaria Salis, Mimmo Lucano, Ignazio Marino, Cristina Guarda, Leoluca Orlando and Benedetta Scuderi. Salis and Lucano, both independents close to SI, joined The Left group, while the other four, Guarda and Scuderi EV members and Marino and Orlando independents close to EV, joined Greens–European Free Alliance. The first party's national celebration, Terra!, was held between 11 and 15 September 2024 in Rome, in the Nomentano Park.

Since 2024, AVS started to participate in regional elections consistently as a joint alliance. AVS had particularly good results, in 2024, in Sardinia (4.7%), Piedmont (6.8%) and Liguria (6.2%) and, in 2025, in Aosta Valley along with Civic Network (6.3%), Tuscany (7.0%), Campania (4.7%) and Veneto (4.6%). In December 2025, in Campania, Zabatta was appointed by president Roberto Fico as regional minister of Youth Policies, Sports, Civil Protection, Biodiversity, Reforestation Policies, Fishing, Aquaculture and Animal protection.

On 9 May 2026, AVS launched "Decidiamo!" ("Let’s Decide!"), an online participatory process (based on the Decidim platform) for voting for voting on proposals created by participants for the 2027 Italian general election, with some non-negotiable starting points. On 18 October, the 16 most-voted proposals (out of 1,700 submitted) were presented.

== Ideology ==
AVS was born with the aim of keeping social justice and environmental justice together. On the basis of its programmes, it was defined as the best Italian party for "climate commitment" by the scientists and experts of Climalteranti and the Italian Climate Network.

=== Work and social policies ===
AVS supports the protection and expansion of workers' rights and welfare. It proposes the introduction of a minimum wage (of 9 or 10 euros per hour), the reduction of working hours (for the same salary), also establishing a fund to encourage employers to reduce weekly hours by at least 10%, a national plan for the prevention of accidents at work, incentive of remote work for workers whose presence is not physically required, the abolition of unpaid internships, the protection of the right to disconnect, the increase of the worker's control over the flexibility of working hours, and the fight against precariousness by limiting the different types of employment contracts, in order to make the permanent contract the norm. It also proposes increasing the duration of paternity leave and making it compulsory and equal to maternity leave, in order to put women and men "on the same level in relation to the employer".

It supports the introduction of a universal basic income, as well as a pension starting (at least for certain types of workers) from the age of 62 (or with 41 years of contributions) and in general not less than 1,000 euros per month. It supports the strengthening of public education and proposes, in this regard, the reduction of the number of students per class in schools and the recovery of public spaces for new classrooms, the extension of time (full-time and extended time) in all schools, compulsory schooling up to 18 years, the hiring of a larger number of permanent teachers (stabilizing even those who have been teaching precariously for longer), the introduction of sexual and affective education throughout the school career, permanent psychological support in schools, and free education from preschool to university (as is the case in other European countries). It also proposes greater investment in research, bringing it to 3% of GDP.

It also supports greater investment in public health, and in this regard proposes: the establishment of the basic psychologist, a plan to structurally strengthen the employees, with the hiring of new operators to reduce both waiting lists and spending on precarious work, external collaborations and outsourcing of services. It also proposes an extraordinary plan for the structural and technological modernization of the health service and the creation of a public company for the production of drugs and vaccines, using the skills of the ISS, the Military Pharmaceutical Institute, university research centers and the SSN. It proposed the introduction of menstrual leave for female workers and students suffering from dysmenorrhea certified by the doctor, and the inclusion of hormonal contraceptives in LEAs so that they are distributed free of charge in pharmacies, subject to a medical prescription.

=== Civil rights ===
AVS is in favour of the legalisation of the "fine vita" (euthanasia and assisted suicide), the legalization (through the establishment of state monopoly) of the production and sale of cannabis (and its derivatives) and the legalization of its cultivation for personal use, to increase security and weaken organized crime. It aims to improve women's sexual and reproductive health by guaranteeing free and effective access to contraception, abortion, medical abortion and pregnancy tests at clinics, also counteracting conscientious objection to abortion. In 2022, in view of the general elections, Gay.it, analyzing the various candidate parties, places the Greens-Left Alliance in 1st place for support to LGBT+ rights in the ranking.

On LGBT+ issues, AVS proposes laws that provide for "the extension of the rights and duties of heterosexual couples to same-sex couples", including same-sex marriage, adoption by same-sex couples and by singles, access to medically assisted procreation paths for women and female couples, and recognition of equal rights for children with same-sex parents. It also proposes a law against homo-bi-transphobia (and ableism), a ban on conversion therapy, a ban on medically unnecessary surgery on intersex children, the revision of the current law 164 on transsexual people, stating that it's committed to "listening to those who go through and live all situations to find solutions and ways together that restore full dignity".

It is in favour of the possibility of granting Italian citizenship to the children of legal foreigners as minors, but only if they have completed at least one cycle of studies (ius scholae) or were born in Italy (ius soli). It proposes a law that provides for projects and programs within schools that talk about education to affectivity, differences and respect for all people in order to counteract gender stereotypes and discrimination upstream, which would cause, according to the party, bullying, misogyny, ableism and "violence of all kinds". It proposes the adoption of a law that provides the possibility of exercising the right to vote in a municipality other than that of residence and the experimentation of electronic voting, in order to "allow students and young workers to save time and travel costs". To prevent abuses of power by law enforcement (e.g. during the management of demonstrations), it proposes identification codes on officers' uniforms and the use of bodycams.

=== Economy and taxation ===
In the economic and fiscal spheres, AVS believes that a reform of the wealth tax is necessary, stating that "today wealth taxes weigh heavily on those who have little and little on those who have a lot". For this reason, it proposes the abolition of IMU and stamp duty on investments and the introduction of a single, progressive personal wealth tax on assets over 5 million euros, which grows up to 2% over 50 million. It aims to combat tax evasion and to achieve this it proposes the incentive of the use of electronic money, the use of databases to cross-reference taxpayers' data, the strengthening of electronic invoicing and split payment, especially on online and POS purchases. It also proposes to deny any tax amnesty, to increase the resources available for controls and to guarantee the certainty of punishment for tax crimes.

For the 2027 elections, AVS proposes a tax reform, presented on 2 October 2026, whose aim is lowering taxes for anyone earning less than €90,000 per year, replacing the three existing personal income tax (IRPEF) brackets with a single, highly progressive continuous function (citing Germany and Denmark as examples), and introducing a wealth tax on net assets exceeding €5.4 million.

=== European Union, foreign policy and defense ===
AVS considers it necessary to build a common European foreign and defence policy, including a European army, in order to make the European Union more autonomous and more independent from the United States and to rationalize military spending, without therefore increasing it further in the member countries. At the same time, it proposes the inclusion in the Treaty on European Union (EU) the "repudiation of war as an instrument of offence against the freedom of other peoples and as a means of resolving international disputes". It supports strengthening the EU's democratic process, starting with the elimination of member countries' right of veto and a greater centrality of the European Parliament, while also limiting the influence of lobbying activities through "comprehensive legislation".

On the Israeli–Palestinian conflict, AVS condemns both Hamas and the actions of the Israel Defense Forces towards the Gaza Strip, and support the two-state solution. It proposes the recognition of the state of Palestine on the basis of the 1967 borders and to guarantee the coexistence in peace of the two peoples in their respective territorial integrity. It demands full respect for international law and the conduct of investigations "into violations, war crimes and genocide" perpetrated by the government of Israel. For the latter, it calls for sanctions commensurate with these violations and to stop all military supplies and the suspension of the association agreement between the European Union and Israel (on the basis of Article 2). On the Russian invasion of Ukraine, it condemns Vladimir Putin for the aggression in Ukraine while considering it necessary to interrupt military supplies to Ukraine and "start negotiations for a lasting peace".

== Composition ==
=== Founding member parties ===
Party	Main ideology	Leader
Italian Left (SI)	Democratic socialism	Nicola Fratoianni
Green Europe (EV)	Green politics	Angelo Bonelli

=== Regional partners ===
Party	Main ideology	Leader	Region
Greens of South Tyrol (Grüne)	Green politics	Felix Wohlgemuth, Marlene Pernstich	South Tyrol
Civic Network (RC)	Social democracy	Elio Riccarand	Aosta Valley
Party of the South (PdS)	Meridionalism	Natale Cuccurese	Southern Italy

=== Former associate parties ===
Party	Main ideology	Leader
Possible (Pos)	Social democracy	Beatrice Brignone
Environment Rights Equality (ADU)	Eco-socialism	Collective leadership
Progressive Party (PP)	Progressivism	Massimo Zedda

== Election results ==
=== Italian Parliament ===
Election	Leader	Chamber of Deputies					Senate of the Republic					Government
Election	Leader	Votes	%	Seats	+/–	Position	Votes	%	Seats	+/–	Position	Government
2022	Angelo Bonelli	1,071,663	3.6	12 / 400	New	7th	972,316	3.5	4 / 200	New	7th	Opposition

=== European Parliament ===
Election	Leader	Votes	%	Seats	+/–	EP Group
2024	Angelo Bonelli; Nicola Fratoianni	1,588,760 (6th)	6.79	6 / 76	New	Greens/EFA / The Left

=== Regional Councils ===
Region	Election	Candidate	Votes	%	Seats	+/–	Status in legislature
Abruzzo	2024	Luciano D'Amico	20,655	3.57	1 / 31	New	Opposition
Aosta Valley	2025	Chiara Minelli	3,816	6.32	2 / 35	New	Opposition
Apulia	2025	Antonio Decaro	54,358	4.09	0 / 51	New	No seats
Basilicata	2024	Piero Marrese	15,144	5.79	1 / 21	New	Opposition
Calabria	2025	Pasquale Tridico	29,251	3.85	0 / 31	New	No seats
Campania	2025	Roberto Fico	93,596	4.66	2 / 51	New	Majority
Emilia-Romagna	2024	Michele De Pascale	79,236	5.30	3 / 50	New	Majority
Friuli-Venezia Giulia	2023	Massimo Moretuzzo	8,029	2.03	1 / 48	New	Opposition
Liguria	2024	Andrea Orlando	34,716	6.17	2 / 31	New	Opposition
Lombardy	2023	Pierfrancesco Majorino	93,019	3.23	1 / 80	New	Opposition
Marche	2025	Matteo Ricci	23,565	4.15	1 / 31	New	Opposition
Molise	2023	Roberto Gravina	6,742	4.77	0 / 21	New	No seats
Piedmont	2024	Gianna Pentenero	107,095	6.48	3 / 49	New	Opposition
Sardinia	2024	Alessandra Todde	31,856	4.66	4 / 60	New	Majority
Trentino	2023	Francesco Valduga	7,565	3.25	1 / 35	New	Opposition
Tuscany	2025	Eugenio Giani	89,064	7.01	3 / 41	New	Majority
Umbria	2024	Stefania Proietti	13,750	4.28	1 / 21	New	Majority
Veneto	2025	Giovanni Manildo	77,621	4.64	2 / 51	New	Opposition
