= Renzo Testolin =

Italian politician (born 1968)

President of Aosta Valley
- Incumbent
- Assumed office 2 March 2023
- Preceded by: Erik Lavévaz

Acting President of Aosta Valley
- In office 16 December 2019 – 21 October 2020
- Preceded by: Antonio Fosson
- Succeeded by: Erik Lavévaz

Vice President of Aosta Valley
- In office 10 December 2018 – 16 December 2019
- President: Antonio Fosson
- Preceded by: Elso Gérandin
- Succeeded by: Luigi Bertschy

Member of the Regional Council of Aosta Valley
- Incumbent
- Assumed office 1 July 2013

Personal details
- Born: March 28, 1968 (age 58) Aosta, Aosta Valley, Italy
- Party: Valdostan Union

Renzo Testolin (born 28 March 1968) is an Italian politician and accountant from the Valdostan Union party, current President of Aosta Valley.

Testolin served as acting President of Aosta Valley following the resignation of Antonio Fosson. He also served as Vice President of Aosta Valley from December 2018 to December 2019 and has served as a member of the Regional Council of Aosta Valley since July 2013. He was elected President of Aosta Valley on 2 March 2023.

== Career ==
Testolin was elected to the Aymavilles town council in 1995, and from 2005 to 2010 served as deputy mayor of Aymavilles. Testolin was elected to the Regional Council of Aosta Valley in the 2013 Valdostan regional election and was reelected in 2018 and 2020. He has served in various cabinet roles, including Regional Councilor for agriculture and natural resources and Councilor for Budget, Finance, Assets and Investments. On December 10, 2018, he was appointed vice president by Antonio Fosson and held that position until 2019, when Fosson resigned after an investigation into 'Ndrangheta interference in the 2018 elections and Testolin was appointed acting president. He served as acting president until October 21, 2020, when Erik Lavévaz was appointed president.

Following the 2025 regional elections, he was re-elected to the regional council on the Valdostan Union list, resulting in the most votes in the entire electoral competition with 3,808 votes.

On November 5, he was re-elected as the president of the regional council as the head of alliance between Valdostan Union, the Centre Alliance and Forza Italia.

On May 2, 2026, the Aosta Court dismissed Testolin for having exceeded the limit of two consecutive terms (he was elected for a fourth consecutive term in 2025) provided by the regional law for all members of the Regional Council.

After filing an appeal, Testolin returned to office on May 11, 2026, as a result of the suspension of the enforceability of the first-instance ruling.
