= Elections in Aosta Valley =

Italian regional elections

This page gathers the results of elections in Aosta Valley.

== Regional elections ==
=== Latest regional election ===
In the latest regional election, which took place on 28 September 2025, the Valdostan Union, which had absorbed the Valdostan Alliance and Mouv', as well as joined forces with the minor-separatist Sovereign Aosta Country party, came largely first, followed by the centre-right coalition (composed of Brothers of Italy, Forza Italia–LRV and Lega Vallée d'Aoste) and the Autonomists of the Centre (formed by Edelweiss, For Autonomy, the Valdostan Rally, the regional section of Action and others).

Party or alliance		Votes	%	Seats
Valdostan Union		19,304	31.97	13
Centre-right coalition	Brothers of Italy	6,634	10.99	4
Centre-right coalition	Forza Italia–LRV	6,066	10.05	4
Centre-right coalition	Lega Vallée d'Aoste	5,062	8.38	3
Centre-right coalition	Total	17,762	29.42	11
Autonomists of the Centre		8,483	14.05	6
Democratic Party		4,854	8.04	3
Greens and Left Alliance		3,816	6.32	2
Open Aosta Valley		3,359	5.56	0
Future Aosta Valley		2,800	4.64	0
Total		60,378	100.00	35
Valid votes		60,378	92.87	
Invalid/blank votes		4,636	7.13	
Total votes		65,014	100.00	
Registered voters/turnout		103,223	62.98	
Source: Autonomous Region of Aosta Valley – Results – ANSA

=== List of previous regional elections ===
- 1949 Valdostan regional election
- 1954 Valdostan regional election
- 1959 Valdostan regional election
- 1963 Valdostan regional election
- 1968 Valdostan regional election
- 1973 Valdostan regional election
- 1978 Valdostan regional election
- 1983 Valdostan regional election
- 1988 Valdostan regional election
- 1993 Valdostan regional election
- 1998 Valdostan regional election
- 2003 Valdostan regional election
- 2008 Valdostan regional election
- 2013 Valdostan regional election
- 2018 Valdostan regional election
- 2020 Valdostan regional election

== Italian general elections ==
=== Latest general election ===
Chamber of Deputies

Candidate	Party or alliance		Votes	%
Franco Manes	VdA–CSX	UV	20,763	38.63
Emily Rini	CDX	FI	16,016	29.80
Giovanni Girardini	none	LRV	6,398	11.90
Erika Guichardaz	Open VdA (Note: Five Star Movement (M5S), Democratic Area – Autonomist Left (AD–GA), Environment Rights Equality (ADU), and Italian Left (SI))	AD–GA	5,841	10.87
Loredana Ronc	ISP	TBA	2,302	4.28
Loredana De Rosa	UP	TBA	1,375	2.56
Davide Ianni	none	PCI	1,051	1.96
Total			53,746	100.00
Valid votes			53,746	90.34
Invalid/blank votes			5,744	9.66
Total votes			59,490	100.00
Registered voters/turnout			98,187	60.59

Senate

Candidate	Party or alliance		Votes	%
Nicoletta Spelgatti	CDX	Lega	18,509	34.05
Patrik Vesan	VdA–CSX	PD	18,282	33.63
Augusto Rollandin	none	PlA	7,272	13.38
Daria Pulz	Open VdA	ADU	5,448	10.02
Alessandro Bichini	ISP	TBA	1,569	2.89
Francesco Lucat	UP	PRC	1,311	2.41
Guglielmo Leray	none	PCI	1,051	1.93
Larisa Bargan	Vita	TBA	917	1.69
Total			54,359	100.00
Valid votes			54,359	91.38
Invalid/blank votes			5,131	8.62
Total votes			59,490	100.00
Registered voters/turnout			98,187	60.59

=== List of previous general elections ===
- 1946 Italian general election in Aosta Valley
- 1948 Italian general election in Aosta Valley
- 1953 Italian general election in Aosta Valley
- 1958 Italian general election in Aosta Valley
- 1963 Italian general election in Aosta Valley
- 1968 Italian general election in Aosta Valley
- 1972 Italian general election in Aosta Valley
- 1976 Italian general election in Aosta Valley
- 1979 Italian general election in Aosta Valley
- 1983 Italian general election in Aosta Valley
- 1987 Italian general election in Aosta Valley
- 1992 Italian general election in Aosta Valley
- 1994 Italian general election in Aosta Valley
- 1996 Italian general election in Aosta Valley
- 2001 Italian general election in Aosta Valley
- 2006 Italian general election in Aosta Valley
- 2008 Italian general election in Aosta Valley
- 2013 Italian general election in Aosta Valley
- 2018 Italian general election in Aosta Valley

== European Parliament elections ==
=== Latest EP election ===
Party	Votes	%
Brothers of Italy	9,704	24.30
Democratic Party	7,966	19.95
Greens and Left Alliance (incl. ADU, RC)	4,834	12.11
Lega (incl. LVd'A)	3,534	8.85
Forza Italia	3,139	7.86
Action	3,045	7.63
Valdostan Rally	2,850	7.14
Five Star Movement	1,823	4.57
United States of Europe	1,356	3.40
Peace Land Dignity	1,255	3.14
Freedom	296	0.74
Popular Alternative	125	0.31
Total	39,927	100.00
Valid votes	39,927	92.25
Invalid/blank votes	3,353	7.75
Total votes	43,280	100.00
Registered voters/turnout	101,729	42.54
Source: Ministry of the Interior

=== List of previous EP elections ===
- 1979 European Parliament election in Aosta Valley
- 1984 European Parliament election in Aosta Valley
- 1989 European Parliament election in Aosta Valley
- 1994 European Parliament election in Aosta Valley
- 1999 European Parliament election in Aosta Valley
- 2004 European Parliament election in Aosta Valley
- 2009 European Parliament election in Aosta Valley
- 2014 European Parliament election in Aosta Valley
- 2019 European Parliament election in Aosta Valley
