= Parliamentary delegations from Aosta Valley =

This is a table of parliamentary delegations from Aosta Valley to the Chamber of Deputies and the Senate since 1946.

Deputy	Legislature	Senator
Giulio Bordon (Indep. PSI)	Constituent Assembly (1946–1948)	
Paolo Alfonso Farinet (DC)	1st Legislature (1948–1953)	Ernest Page (DC)
Paolo Alfonso Farinet (DC)	2nd Legislature (1953–1958)	Ernest Page (DC)
Severino Caveri (UV)	3rd Legislature (1958–1963)	Renato Chabod (Indep. PSI)
Corrado Gex (UV)	4th Legislature (1963–1968)	Renato Chabod (Indep. PSI)
Germanno Olietti (Indep. DC)	5th Legislature (1968–1972)	Amato Berthet (DC)
Emilio Chanoux (UVP)	6th Legislature (1972–1976)	Giuseppe Filliétróz (UVP)
Ruggero Millet (Indep. PCI)	7th Legislature (1976–1979)	Pierre Fosson (UV)
Cesare Dujany (DP)	8th Legislature (1979–1983)	Pierre Fosson (UV)
Cesare Dujany (DP)	9th Legislature (1983–1987)	Pierre Fosson (UV)
Luciano Caveri (UV)	10th Legislature (1987–1992)	Cesare Dujany (ADP)
Luciano Caveri (UV)	11th Legislature (1992–1994)	Cesare Dujany (ADP)
Luciano Caveri (UV)	12th Legislature (1994–1996)	Cesare Dujany (PVdA)
Luciano Caveri (UV)	13th Legislature (1996–2001)	Guido Dondeynaz (Indep. UV)
Ivo Collé (SA)	14th Legislature (2001–2006)	Augusto Rollandin (UV)
Roberto Nicco (Indep. DS)	15th Legislature (2006–2008)	Carlo Perrin (RV)
Roberto Nicco (Indep. PD)	16th Legislature (2008–2013)	Antonio Fosson (UV)
Rudi Marguerettaz (SA)	17th Legislature (2013–2018)	Albert Lanièce (UV)
Elisa Tripodi (M5S)	18th Legislature (2018–2022)	Albert Lanièce (UV)
Franco Manes (UV)	19th Legislature (2022–present)	Nicoletta Spelgatti (LVdA–Lega)

Source: Council of the Valley – History of Aosta Valley
