= Aosta Valley (political coalition) =

Aosta Valley Vallée d'Aoste
- Founded: 1983
- Ideology: Regionalism; Autonomism
- Political position: Big tent
- Chamber of Deputies: 1 / 400
- Senate: 0 / 200
- European Parliament: 0 / 73
- Regional Council of Aosta Valley: 21 / 35

Aosta Valley (Vallée d'Aoste, VdA) is a regionalist coalition of parties active in Aosta Valley, Italy.

Under this banner, with some variations, the Valdostan Union (UV) has participated in Italian general elections, along with its allies (sometimes also countrywide parties), which have changed from time to time, since 1983. Since its foundation, the list has won most of the races for both houses of the Italian Parliament (see parliamentary delegations from Aosta Valley).

The original allies of the UV within VdA were the Progressive Democratic Autonomists (ADP), formed at the merger of the Popular Democrats (PD) and the Progressive Valdostan Union (UVP). In 2006, the UV, Edelweiss (SA) and the Autonomist Federation (FA) formed a coalition also in regional government. After a transitional period during which the UV-led coalition was reshuffled four times, in the 2022 general election VdA is composed of the UV, SA, the Valdostan Alliance (AV), United Aosta Valley (VdAU), the Democratic Party (PD), Action (A), and Italia Viva (IV).

== Recent history ==
In the European Parliament election in 2004, UV's Federalismo list only ran in North-West Italy and formed an alliance with The Olive Tree.

In the 2006 general election an alternative, centre-left coalition called Autonomy Liberty Democracy (ALD) was formed as Valdostan Renewal (RV), a split from the UV, had joined forces with the Democrats of the Left (DS) and minor parties. In the election the UV-led coalition, named at the time Autonomy Progress Federalism Aosta Valley (Vallée d'Aoste Autonomie Progrès Fédéralisme, VdA–APF), was soundly defeated in both races for the Italian Parliament for the first time since 1972, when the UVP joined forces with the Italian Communist Party (PCI). In the election for the Valdostan seat in the Chamber of Deputies Marco Viérin (SA, VdA) lost 43.4% to 30.7% to Roberto Nicco (DS, ALD), while in the Senate race incumbent senator Augusto Rollandin (UV, VdA) was defeated 44.2% to 32.0% by Carlo Perrin (RV, ALD).

The UV, SA and the FA presented again the list, simply named Vallée d'Aoste, in the 2008 general election. Antonio Fosson (UV, VdA) defeated incumbent senator Perrin 41.4% to 37.4%, while Ego Perron (UV, VdA) was narrowly defeated by incumbent deputy Nicco, who had joined the newly-formed Democratic Party (PD), 39.1% to 37.8%. After two years of absence, the coalition made thus its return to the Italian Parliament. Under a new electoral law, which included coalitions and a majority premium for the winning coalition, VdA ran together also in the 2008 regional election, gaining 62.0% of the vote and a stable majority in the Regional Council. For the 2009 European Parliament election UV signed an apparentment with the centre-right The People of Freedom (PdL).

In the 2013 general election VdA elected both MPs from Aosta Valley: Albert Lanièce (UV, VdA) defeated Patrizia Morelli (Autonomy Liberty Participation Ecology–ALPE, ALD) 37.0% to 30.8% for the Senate, while Rudi Marguerettaz (SA, VdA) defeated both Jean Pierre Guichardaz (PD, ALD) and Laurent Viérin (Progressive Valdostan Union–UVP). In the 2013 regional election the coalition won 47.9% of the vote and narrowly retained its absolute majority in the Regional Council. Only the UV and SA obtained elects, while the FA soon folded and most of its members joined the UV, through a short-lived party named "Create VdA".

Electoral logo in 2018

In July 2015 the regional government, led by Augusto Rollandin since 2008 (Rollandin had been President of Aosta Valley in 1984–1990), was enlarged to the centre-left PD. In June 2016, after months of negotiations, the government was joined also by the UVP. In March 2017 the UVP, SA, Autonomy Liberty Participation Ecology (ALPE) and For Our Valley (PNV) formed a new government without the UV, under President Pierluigi Marquis (SA). In October Marquis resigned and was replaced by L. Viérin (UVP) at the head of a coalition composed of the UV, the UVP, the PD and the Valdostan Autonomist Popular Edelweiss (EPAV), the latter formed by a pro-UV group of splinters from SA who had not endorsed Marquis' government in the first place.

In the 2018 general election VdA, also known as Tradition and Progress (Tradition et progrès–Vallée d'Aoste, TP–VdA), was composed of the UV, the UVP, the PD and the EPAV, as the regional government. The candidate for the Senate was Lanièce (UV), that for the Chamber Alessia Favre (UVP). SA, ALPE and PNV founded the rival For All coalition. Lanièce was re-elected to the Senate with 25.8% against 23.2% of his closest opponent, Luciano Mossa of the Five Star Movement (M5S), while Favre obtained 21.7% of the vote and that was not enough to beat Elisa Tripodi of the M5S, who was thus elected to the Chamber. It marked the first time that a candidate not supported by a regionalist candidate won.

In the 2019 European Parliament election most autonomist parties run as part of Autonomies for Europe allied to PD. After the snap elections in 2020 the UV, the Valdostan Alliance (AV; merger of ALPE and the UVP), the PD, the Mouv'-led United Aosta Valley (VdAU) and SA formed a coalition.

In the 2022 general election, the 2019 coalition was enlarged to the regional sections of Action (A) and Italia Viva (IV). By 2025, most regionalist parties merged into UV, while SA, For Autonomy (PlA, a party founded by Rollandin) and Valdostan Rally (RV) founded Autonomists of the Centre. A proposed alliance for the 2025 regional election between the lists was rejected by PlA.

== Member parties ==
For the 2022 general election, the coalition is composed of the following parties:

Party	Ideology
Valdostan Union (UV)	Regionalism
Valdostan Alliance (AV)	Progressivism
United Aosta Valley (VdAU)	Progressivism
Edelweiss (SA)	Christian democracy
Democratic Party (PD)	Social democracy
Action (A)	Liberalism
Italia Viva (IV)	Liberalism

== Election results ==
=== Chamber of Deputies ===
Election	Votes	%	Seats	+/−	Candidate
1992	41,404 (1st)	49.6	1 / 1	–	Luciano Caveri
1994	43,700 (1st)	54.1	1 / 1	–	Luciano Caveri
1996	37,431 (1st)	48.6	1 / 1	–	Luciano Caveri
2001	25,577 (1st)	35.0	1 / 1	–	Ivo Collé
2006	24,119 (2nd)	30.7	0 / 1	▼1	Marco Vierin
2008	28,357 (2nd)	37.8	0 / 1	–	Ego Perron
2013	18,376 (1st)	25.4	1 / 1	▲1	Rudi Marguerettaz
2018	14,429 (2nd)	21.7	0 / 1	▼1	Alessia Favre
2022	20,763 (1st)	38.6	1 / 1	▲1	Franco Manes

=== Senate of the Republic ===
Election	Votes	%	Seats	+/−	Candidate	Ref.
1992	34,150 (1st)	47.4	1 / 1	–	Cesare Dujany	
1994	27,493 (1st)	38.3	1 / 1	–	Cesare Dujany	
1996	29,538 (1st)	44.2	1 / 1	–	Guido Dondeynaz	
2001	32,429 (1st)	49.3	1 / 1	–	Augusto Rollandin	
2006	23,574 (2nd)	32.0	0 / 1	▼1	Augusto Rollandin	
2008	29,191 (1st)	41.4	1 / 1	▲1	Antonio Fosson	
2013	24,609 (1st)	37.0	1 / 1	–	Albert Lanièce	
2018	15,958 (1st)	25.8	1 / 1	–	Albert Lanièce	
2022	18,282 (2nd)	33.6	0 / 1	▼1	Patrick Vesan	
