= Autonomy Liberty Democracy =

Autonomy Liberty Democracy Autonomie Liberté Démocratie
- Founded: 2006
- Dissolved: 2015
- Political position: Centre-left
- National affiliation: Centre-left coalition

Website
- Official website

Autonomy Liberty Democracy (Autonomie Liberté Démocratie, ALD) was a centre-left coalition in Aosta Valley, Italy. It took part to three Italian general elections and elected representatives in both houses of the Italian Parliament.

== History ==
ALD was originally formed as an electoral list, affiliated to The Union, for the 2006 general election comprising: the Democrats of the Left (DS), The Daisy (DL), Valdostan Renewal (RV), Vallée d'Aoste Vive (VdAV), Alé Vallée (AV), the Communist Refoundation Party (PRC), the Federation of the Greens (Alternative Greens) and other minor parties. In that occasion, ALD elected a deputy, Roberto Nicco (DS), and a senator, Carlo Perrin (RV), defeating Marco Viérin (SA, VdA) 43.4% to 30.7% and incumbent senator Augusto Rollandin (UV, VdA) 44.2% to 32.0%, respectively.

In the 2008 general election Antonio Fosson (UV, VdA) defeated incumbent senator Perrin 41.4% to 37.4%, while incumbent deputy Nicco narrowly defeated Ego Perron (UV, VdA) 39.1% to 37.8%. Under a new electoral law, the coalition ran together also in the 2008 regional election. The alliance, comprising three party lists (the Democratic Party–PD, RV–VdAV and Rainbow Aosta Valley–AvdA), won a mere 27.4% of the vote, being severely defeated by the UV-led regionalist coalition, which won 62.0% of the vote and confirmed its stable majority in the Regional Council. In the 2009 European Parliament election, ALD made an agreement with Italy of Values but only reached 18.5% less than their centre-right rival "Aosta Valley" neither of them won a MEP.

In the 2013 general election Patrizia Morelli (ALPE, ALD) was defeated by Albert Lanièce (UV, VdA) 37.0% to 30.8% for the Senate, while Jean Pierre Guichardaz (PD, ALD) came third after Rudi Marguerettaz (SA, VdA) and Laurent Viérin (UVP). UVP endorsed Morelli. In the 2013 regional election the coalition, including also the UVP, won 40.5%. In the 2014 European Parliament election, UVP and ALPE endorsed Luca Barbieri of PD who became the most voted candidate in the region with 8,128 preference votes but failed to be elected while the Aosta Valley coalition was absent.

In July 2015 and June 2016 the regional government, formed by the UV and SA, was enlarged to the PD and the UVP, respectively. In March 2017 the UVP, ALPE, SA and PNV formed a new government without the UV, under President Pierluigi Marquis (SA). In October Marquis resigned and was replaced by L. Viérin (UVP) at the head of a coalition composed of the UV, the UVP, the PD and the Valdostan Autonomist Popular Edelweiss (EPAV), the latter formed by a pro-UV group of splinters from SA who had not endorsed Marquis' government in the first place. In the run-up of the 2018 general election ALD was thus disbanded.

== Electoral results ==
=== Italian Parliament ===
Chamber of Deputies						Senate				
Election year	Votes	%	Seats	+/−	Leader	Votes	%	Seats	+/−	Leader
2006	34,168 (1st)	43.4	1 / 1	new	Roberto Nicco	32,554 (1st)	44.2	1 / 1	new	Carlo Perrin
2008	29,311 (1st)	39.1	1 / 1	Steady	Roberto Nicco	26,375 (2nd)	37.4	0 / 1	▼1	Carlo Perrin
2013 (Note: UVP ran their own candidate for the Chamber of Deputies; Laurent Viérin with 18,191 votes (25.1%) ending second.)	14,340 (3rd)	19.8	0 / 1	▼1	Jean Pierre Guichardaz	20,430 (2nd)	30.8	0 / 1	Steady	Patrizia Morelli

=== Regional Council ===
Election year	Votes	%	Seats	+/−
2008	20,131 (2nd)	27.4	8 / 35	▲1
2013	29,187 (2nd)	40.5	15 / 35	▲7

=== European Parliament ===
Election year	Votes	%	Seats	+/−
2009 (Note: PD ran with their own list gaining 7,161 (12.8%) in the Aosta Valley. IdV was ALD's national partner gaining 2,297 (4.1%) there.)	10,320 (2nd)	18.5	0 / 21	new
2014	21,854 (1st)	47.1	0 / 21	Steady
