= Centre-left coalition (Italy) =

Political alliance in Italy

Centre-left coalition Coalizione di centro-sinistra
- Abbreviation: CSX
- Leaders: Elly Schlein; Giuseppe Conte; Angelo Bonelli; Nicola Fratoianni
- Founder: Romano Prodi
- Founded: 6 March 1995
- Merger of: Alliance of Progressives; Pact for Italy
- Political position: Centre to left-wing
- Colours: Red
- Chamber of Deputies (Note: Including PD-IDP, M5S, AVS, IV, +E, CD and VdA): 138 / 400
- Senate of the Republic (Note: Including PD-IDP, M5S, AVS, IV and Campobase): 76 / 205
- European Parliament (Note: Including PD, M5S and AVS): 35 / 76
- Conference of Regions: 7 / 21
- Regional Councils: 270 / 897

The centre-left coalition (Italian: coalizione di centro-sinistra, CSX) is a political alliance of political parties in Italy active under several forms and names since 1995, when The Olive Tree was formed under the leadership of Romano Prodi. The centre-left coalition has ruled the country for more than thirteen years between 1996 and 2021; to do so, it had mostly to rely on a big tent that went from the more radical left-wing, which had more weight between 1996 and 2008, to the political centre, which had more weight during the 2010s, and its main parties were also part of grand coalitions and national unity governments.

The coalition mostly competed with the centre-right coalition founded by Silvio Berlusconi. In the 1996 Italian general election, The Olive Tree consisted of the majority of both the left-wing Alliance of Progressives and the centrist Pact for Italy, the two losing coalitions in the 1994 Italian general election, the first under a system based primarily on first-past-the-post voting. In 2005, The Union was founded as a wider coalition to contest the 2006 Italian general election, which later collapsed due to Clemente Mastella during the 2008 Italian political crisis, with the fall of the second Prodi government.

In the late 2000s and early 2010s, the centre-left coalition has been built around the Democratic Party (PD), which was established in 2007 from a merger of Democrats of the Left and Democracy is Freedom, the main parties affiliated to both The Olive Tree and The Union. The centre-left coalition was part of Italian governments from November 2011 to June 2018, when a coalition government between the Five Star Movement (M5S) and the League was formed.

In September 2019, the centre-left returned to power in coalition with the M5S, with centre-left parties participating in the national unity government of Mario Draghi, who was the country's prime minister from February 2021 until the 2022 Italian government crisis in July that led to the 2022 Italian general election. Under an electoral law (Rosatellum) that favoured unity and coalitions, a divided centre-left, M5S, and PD splinter party suffered a loss to the centre-right coalition, which won a majority of seats for the first time since the 2008 Italian general election. Since 2023, PD, M5S, Greens and Left Alliance (AVS) and minor centre-left parties often run within the same coalition at local and regional level in the Progressive Camp or Broad Camp.

== History ==
=== Road to The Olive Tree ===
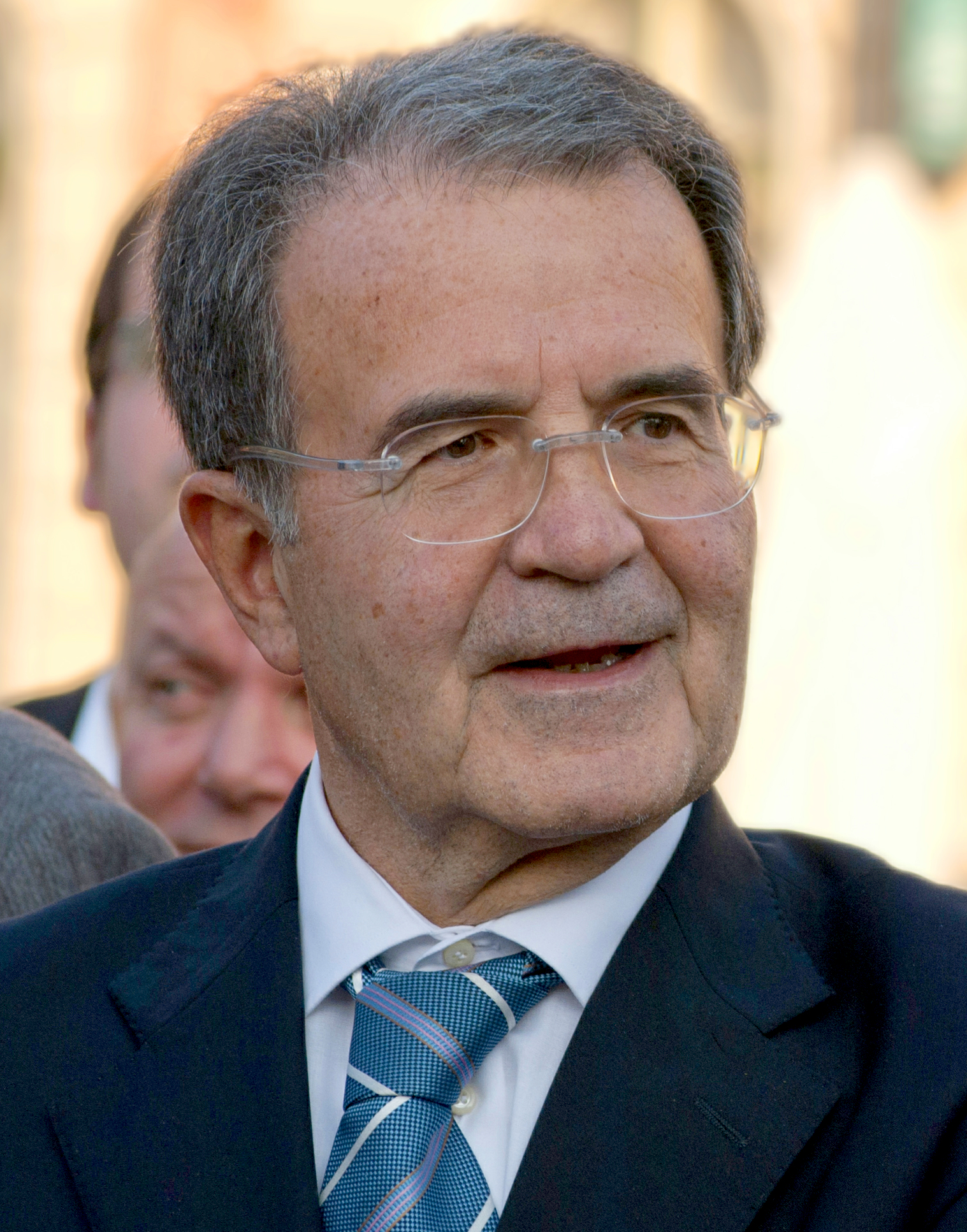
Prodi in 2011

Following the 1994 Italian general election, which was won by the centre-right coalition of Silvio Berlusconi, the left-wing Alliance of Progressives and the centrist Pact for Italy started a parliamentary cooperation, which brought in March 1995 to the foundation of The Olive Tree. The historical leader and ideologue of these coalitions was Romano Prodi, Professor of Economics and former member of Christian Democracy (DC), who invented the name and the symbol of The Olive Tree with Arturo Parisi in 1995.

In 1995, Lega Nord exited the Pole of Freedoms and supported Lamberto Dini's technocratic government, together with the Pact for Italy and the Alliance of Progressives. On 21 April 1996, The Olive Tree won 1996 Italian general election with the Communist Refoundation Party (PRC) as an external ally, making Romano Prodi the Prime Minister of Italy. The Olive Tree's largest partner was the Democratic Party of the Left (PDS), which contained the bulk of the former Italian Communist Party. The PDS supplied 16 ministers and 10 junior ministers; it was the first time that former PCI members had taken part in government since 1947. One of their leaders, Walter Veltroni, who ran in ticket with Prodi in a long electoral campaign, was Deputy Prime Minister of Italy. On 9 October 1998, the first Prodi government fell when PRC left the alliance. Since 21 October 1998, The Olive Tree was the core of the governments led by Massimo D'Alema and by Giuliano Amato. When D'Alema became the new prime minister, it was the first time ever in both Italy and Western Europe that an heir of the Communist party tradition came to lead a government. On 13 May 2001, led by Francesco Rutelli, who ran in ticket with Piero Fassino, the centre-left coalition lost the general elections against Berlusconi and the House of Freedoms.

=== The Union ===
The Union was the direct heir of The Olive Tree. While The Union was an heterogenous alliance that also included Communist parties, they were not part of The Olive Tree. Prodi won the 2006 Italian general election by a very narrow margin due to the new electoral law enacted by Roberto Calderoli; Berlusconi refused to acknowledge defeat. Prodi's coalition proved to be extremely frail, as the two-vote margin in the Senate of the Republic allowed almost any party in the coalition to veto legislation and political views inside the coalition spanned from communists to Christian democrats.

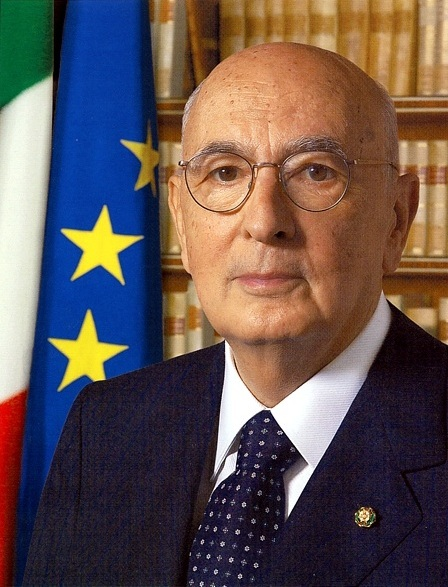
Napolitano in 2006

On 7 May 2006, the centre-left coalition officially endorsed Giorgio Napolitano as its candidate in the 2006 Italian presidential election that began on 8 May. The Holy See endorsed him as the president of Italy through its official newspaper, L'Osservatore Romano, just after The Union named him as its candidate, as did Marco Follini, former secretary of the Union of Christian and Centre Democrats (UDCC), a member party of the House of Freedoms. On 10 May 2006, Napolitano was elected in the fourth round of voting, the first of those requiring only an absolute majority, unlike the first three which required two-thirds of the votes, with 543 votes (out of a possible 1009). At the age of 80, he became the first former PCI member to become president of Italy

On 21 February 2007, less than a year after he had won the elections, Prodi tendered his resignation to Napolitano after the government was defeated in the Senate by two ballots in a vote on foreign policy. On 24 February, Napolitano invited Prodi to return to office and face a vote of confidence. Major causes of friction inside the coalition were the 2006 Pardon Act (it was criticised by the centre-right coalition and by the Italy of Values party), a draft bill to establish civil unions (vetoed by Christian democrats), Italy's continued involvement in Afghanistan (strongly opposed by left-wing parties), and the much publicised house-arrest of Clemente Mastella's wife (then a prominent politician at the regional level) over a corruption scandal. Mastella's party Union of Democrats for Europe held enough seats in the Senate that his eventual decision to withdraw its support for the government meant the end of the legislature on 6 February 2008. Mastella, who also resigned from his office as Minister of Justice, cited the proposed reform of the electoral system that would have made it difficult for small parties like his own to gain seats in the Italian Parliament, as well as the lack of personal support from his coalition partners' as one of the reasons behind his decision.

=== Foundation of the Democratic Party ===
The Democratic Party (PD) was founded on 14 October 2007 as a merger of various centre-left parties that had been part of The Union in the 2006 general election. At foundation, the majority of the PD was formed by the Democrats of the Left (DS), heirs of the PCI, and the largely Catholic-inspired Democracy is Freedom – The Daisy (DL). Within the party, an important role is played by Christian leftists, who are direct heirs of the former DC's left wing. After the resignation of Silvio Berlusconi as prime minister in November 2011, the PD gave external support to Mario Monti's technocratic government.

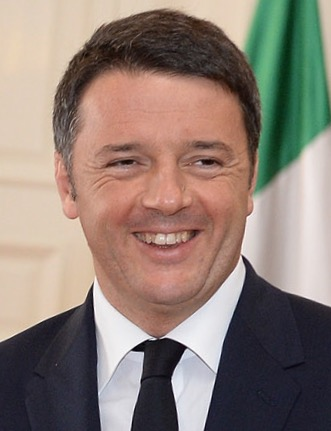
Renzi in 2015

Following the 2013 Italian general election and the 2014 European Parliament election in Italy, the PD was the largest party in the Chamber of Deputies, the Senate, and the European Parliament, respectively. Since April 2013, due to the inconclusive results of the 2013 general election held in February despite being the largest party and Pier Luigi Bersani's Italia. Bene Comune centre-left coalition, the PD member Enrico Letta was prime minister at the head of a government sustained by a grand coalition including The People of Freedom, which was later replaced by the New Centre-Right (NCD) as the new Forza Italia (FI) went to the opposition, Civic Choice (SC), and the Union of the Centre (UdC), the renamed UDCC that was later replaced by the Populars for Italy (PpI). Following his election as party leader in February 2014, Matteo Renzi called for "a new phase" and consequently the party's national board voted to ask Letta to resign. Subsequently, Renzi was sworn in as prime minister at the head of the same coalition.

By 2015, other than the national government, the PD led fifteen regional governments out of twenty and functioned as coalition partner in Trentino-Alto Adige/Südtirol. The 2016 Italian constitutional referendum was supported by the parties of the Renzi government: the PD, the NCD, and SC, plus the Liberal Popular Alliance (ALA) of Denis Verdini, who broke with Berlusconi in July 2015 in order to support the Renzi government. Inside the centre-left coalition, the UdC, the Federation of the Greens (FdV), Autonomy Liberty Participation Ecology (ALPE), Progressive Valdostan Union (UVP), Slovene Union (US), and Christian Popular Union (UPC) campaigned for the "No" vote. The referendum was lost with 41% of "Yes" against 59% of "No" votes. After the referendum, Renzi tendered his resignation as prime minister and Paolo Gentiloni, also a member of the PD, became his successor. In the 2018 Italian general election, the centre-left coalition led by with Renzi obtained its worst result ever at 22.9% of the vote, well behind the centre-right coalition and the Five Star Movement (M5S). Following the defeat, Renzi resigned from secretary of the PD, and his deputy Maurizio Martina functioning afterwards as acting secretary.

In September 2019, the PD formed a coalition government with the M5S and the PD's left-wing split Free and Equal (LeU), which was supported by the members of the centre-left coalition in 2018. Following the 2021 Italian government crisis, which was caused by Renzi's Italia Viva (IV) centrist party, Giuseppe Conte was replaced by Mario Draghi. In February 2021, a national unity government including the PD, MS5, IV, Article One, and Berlusconi's FI and Matteo Salvini's rebranded and renamed League. The Draghi government collapsed during the 2022 Italian government crisis, leading to Draghi's resignation as prime minister that July and a snap general election being called for September. For the 2022 Italian general election, the centre-left coalition centered around the PD's Democratic and Progressive Italy electoral list, which was allied with the Civic Commitment, Greens and Left Alliance, and More Europe lists. Due to the Italian electoral law of 2015 that was supported by Renzi and that favoured unity and coalition, the centre-left coalition, which was not able to form alliances with the M5S (accused of causing the fall of Draghi's government) and the PD's centrist party splits that were opposed to the left-wing parties of the coalition, was defeated by the centre-right coalition led Brothers of Italy (the sole centre-right coalition to oppose the Draghi's government) of Giorgia Meloni, who returned to power for the first time since 2011.

=== The Broad Field ===
Since the splitting of progressive forces in the previous elections, the subsequent election of Elly Schlein as secretary in the Democratic Party's 2023 primaries was the start of a new warming between traditional centre-left parties and Giuseppe Conte's Five Star Movement. With the two yielding together common candidates in almost all the regional elections between 2024 and 2026, sharing initiatives against Meloni government, and the further positioning to the left of both Conte's "pentastellati" and Schlein's leadership, the term "Broad Field" or "Progressive Field" became of common use in Italy's public debate, describing the somewhat still defining coalition between PD, M5S, Greens and Left Alliance and minor liberal and centrist parties, like More Europe – which relaxed its opposing stance towards M5S – and Italian Socialist Party, joined later by Matteo Renzi and his Italia Viva party, a move that is still controversial both within the coalition and outside, notably from centrists like his former ally Carlo Calenda and previously hardline "renziano" Luigi Marattin, with him founding the centre-right Liberal Democratic Party. Since 2025, both Civic Project Italy, led by Alessandro Onorato, and Plus One, Ernesto Maria Ruffini's new party, flourished in this same political space, respectively trying to organize the civic and catholic forces around the Broad Field: while the former was joined by ControCorrente and various other regional and local forces and politicians, the latter attracted personalities like Franco Gabrielli and like-minded parties like the Democratic Centre and Primavera. In spring 2026, Communist Refoundation Party's leader Maurizio Acerbo vowed to create a "Front for the Constitution" with the mainstream progressive forces, marking the first time since in twenty years that communists and centre-left parties chose to run together: the deal was somewhat made official on 23 October, with PD's senator Andrea Crisanti leaving his group and creating a component to help the left-wing party get over the high signatures threshold, imposed by the controversial Stabilicum. Civic Project Italy and PSI also were helped by senator Luigi Nave, from M5s, while Più Europa tried to form a group comprising Bruno Tabacci, which became Ruffini's trusted presence in the Italian parliament. In the aftermath of 2026 Italian constitutional referendum, almost all of the allied parties agreed to promote coalition primaries: this however created a perception of rivalry between Schlein and Conte, which was strongly criticized by AVS's leaders Nicola Fratoianni and Angelo Bonelli, with the two declaring their doubts on the usefulness of a primary election and pushing the two senior partners to prioritize unity.

On 31 October 2026, the Democratic Party, Five Star Movement, Greens and Left Alliance, Italia Viva, More Europe, Civic Project Italy and Plus One reached an agreement to form the new centre-left coalition. On 12 November, Possibile also declared that it wanted to join the Broad Camp.

== The Olive Tree (1995–2005) ==
=== 1996–1998 ===
In the 1996 Italian general election and during the first Prodi government, the coalition was composed of the following parties:

Party	Ideology	Leader
Democratic Party of the Left (PDS) (Note: Including the Labour Federation, the Social Christians, the Republican Left, the Movement of Unitarian Communists and the Democratic Federation.)	Democratic socialism	Massimo D'Alema
Italian People's Party (PPI) (Note: It contested the election under the banner of the Populars for Prodi joint list, along with the Democratic Union, the Italian Republican Party and the South Tyrolean People's Party. The list included also the Federation of Liberals.)	Christian democracy	Franco Marini
Italian Renewal (RI) (Note: Including the Italian Socialists, the Democratic Italian Movement and Segni Pact.)	Liberalism	Lamberto Dini
Federation of the Greens (FdV)	Green politics	Carlo Ripa di Meana

The coalition had the following regional partners:

Party	Region	Ideology	Leader
Lega Autonomia Veneta (LAV)	Veneto	Regionalism	Mario Rigo
Sardinian Action Party (PSd'Az)	Sardinia	Sardinian nationalism	Franco Meloni

The Olive Tree presented candidates of The Network and the Ladin Autonomist Union in some first-past-the-post constituencies. The coalition also made an agreement of desistance with the Communist Refoundation Party in some first-past-the-post constituencies, which ran under the banner of the Progressives.

=== 1998–2001 ===
In 1998, the Communist Refoundation Party brought down the first Prodi government. with a splinter faction forming the Party of Italian Communists. In 1998–2001, during the two governments led by Massimo D'Alema (1998–2000) and the one led by Giuliano Amato (2000–2001), the coalition was composed of eight parties:

Party	Ideology	Leader
Democrats of the Left (DS)	Social democracy	Walter Veltroni
Italian People's Party (PPI)	Christian democracy	Franco Marini / Pierluigi Castagnetti
The Democrats (Dem)	Social liberalism	Romano Prodi / Arturo Parisi
Italian Renewal (RI)	Liberalism	Lamberto Dini
Party of Italian Communists (PdCI)	Communism	Armando Cossutta / Oliviero Diliberto
Italian Democratic Socialists (Note: The party did not participate in D'Alema II Cabinet and briefly formed The Clover coalition, along with the Italian Republican Party and the Union for the Republic.) (SDI)	Social democracy	Enrico Boselli
Federation of the Greens (FdV)	Green politics	Luigi Manconi / Grazia Francescato
Democratic Union for the Republic (UDR) (Note: Until February 1999.)	Christian democracy	Clemente Mastella
Union of Democrats for Europe (UDEUR) (Note: Since May 1999.)	Christian democracy	Clemente Mastella

=== 2001 general election ===
In the 2001 Italian general election, the coalition was led by Francesco Rutelli, and was composed of nine parties:

Party	Ideology	Leader
Democrats of the Left (DS) (Note: Including the Mancini List.)	Social democracy	Walter Veltroni
Democracy is Freedom (DL) (Note: Joint list composed of Italian People's Party, The Democrats, Italian Renewal and Union of Democrats for Europe; the list included also the Federation of Liberals.)	Social liberalism / Christian left	Francesco Rutelli
The Sunflower (Note: Joint list composed of the Federation of the Greens and the Italian Democratic Socialists.)	Green politics / Social democracy	Grazia Francescato / Enrico Boselli
Party of Italian Communists (PdCI)	Communism	Oliviero Diliberto
New Country (PN) (Note: New Country was a lista civetta.)	Single-issue politics	None

The coalition had the following regional partners:

Party	Region	Ideology	Leader
South Tyrolean People's Party (SVP)	Trentino-Alto Adige	Regionalism	Siegfried Brugger
With Illy for Trieste	Friuli-Venezia Giulia	Regionalism	Riccardo Illy

The Olive Tree made an agreement of desistance with the Communist Refoundation Party in the first-past-the-post constituencies.

=== 2004 EP election ===
In the 2004 European Parliament election in Italy, the United in the Olive Tree joint list, was composed of four parties:

Party	Ideology	Leader
Democrats of the Left (DS)	Social democracy	Piero Fassino
Democracy is Freedom – The Daisy (DL)	Social liberalism	Francesco Rutelli
Italian Democratic Socialists (SDI)	Social democracy	Enrico Boselli
European Republicans Movement (MRE)	Social liberalism	Luciana Sbarbati

The list was connected with the following regional partners:

Party	Ideology	Leader
South Tyrolean People's Party (SVP) (Note: Including the Trentino Tyrolean Autonomist Party and the Slovene Union.)	Regionalism	Siegfried Brugger
Valdostan Union (UV)	Regionalism	Manuela Zublena

== The Union (2005–2008) ==
=== 2006 general election ===
In the 2006 Italian general election, the coalition was composed of thirteen parties:

Party	Ideology	Leader
Democrats of the Left (DS) (Note: DS, DL, MRE and PSDI contested the election for the Chamber within The Olive Tree joint list.)	Social democracy	Piero Fassino
Democracy is Freedom – The Daisy (DL)	Social liberalism	Francesco Rutelli
Communist Refoundation Party (PRC)	Communism	Fausto Bertinotti
Italian Democratic Socialists (SDI) (Note: SDI and RI contested elections within the Rose in the Fist joint list. The list was also supported by the Federation of Liberals.)	Social democracy	Enrico Boselli
Italian Radicals (RI)	Liberalism	Emma Bonino
Italy of Values (Note: Including the Democratic Republicans.) (IdV)	Anti-corruption politics	Antonio Di Pietro
Party of Italian Communists (PdCI)	Communism	Oliviero Diliberto
Federation of the Greens (FdV)	Green politics	Alfonso Pecoraro Scanio
Union of Democrats for Europe (UDEUR)	Christian democracy	Clemente Mastella
Pensioners' Party (PP)	Pensioners' interests	Carlo Fatuzzo
The Italian Socialists (SI)	Social democracy	Bobo Craxi
Consumers' List (LC) (Note: Including the Christian Democracy, The Liberals Sgarbi and the Southern Democratic Party.)	Consumer protection	Renato Campiglia
United Consumers	Consumer protection	Bruno De Vita
Italian Democratic Socialist Party (PSDI)	Social democracy	Giorgio Carta
European Republicans Movement (MRE)	Social liberalism	Luciana Sbarbati
United Democratic Christians (DCU)	Christian democracy	Giovanni Mongiello

The coalition had the following regional partners:

Party	Region	Ideology	Leader
Autonomy Liberty Democracy (ALD) (Note: Also including Vallée d'Aoste Vive, Alternative Greens and Valdostan Renewal.)	Aosta Valley	Regionalism	Carlo Perrin
South Tyrolean People's Party (SVP) (Note: Including the Trentino Tyrolean Autonomist Party.)	Trentino-Alto Adige	Regionalism	Elmar Pichler Rolle
Lega per l'Autonomia – Alleanza Lombarda (LAL)	Lombardy	Regionalism	Matteo Brivio
Liga Fronte Veneto (LFV)	Veneto	Regionalism	Fabrizio Comencini

The coalition was supported by the Autonomists for Europe, Radicals of the Left, and the New Action Party.

== PD-led coalitions (2008–present) ==
=== 2008 general election ===
In the 2008 Italian general election, the coalition was led by Walter Veltroni, and was composed of three parties:

Party	Ideology	Leader
Democratic Party (Note: Also including the Italian Radicals, the European Republicans Movement, the Moderates and the Slovene Union.) (PD)	Social democracy	Walter Veltroni
Italy of Values (IdV)	Anti-corruption politics	Antonio Di Pietro

The coalition also had the following regional partners:

Party	Region	Ideology	Leader
South Tyrolean People's Party (SVP) (Note: The SVP ran independently for the Chamber and in 4 out of 6 colleges in Trentino-Alto Adige for the Senate in a joint list with the other centre-left parties (Democratic Party, Italy of Values, Socialist Party, Trentino Tyrolean Autonomist Party and Daisy Civic List).)	Trentino-Alto Adige	Regionalism	Philipp Achammer
Autonomy Liberty Democracy (Note: Also including the Vallée d'Aoste Vive, the Alternative Greens and the Valdostan Renewal.) (ALD)	Aosta Valley	Regionalism	Roberto Louvin

=== 2013 general election ===
In the 2013 Italian general election, the coalition ran as Italy. Common Good under the leadership of Pier Luigi Bersani, and was composed of the following parties:

Party	Ideology	Leader
Democratic Party (PD) (Note: Including candidates of the Italian Socialist Party, the Moderates and the Slovene Union.)	Social democracy	Pier Luigi Bersani
Left Ecology Freedom (SEL) (Note: Including Greens of South Tyrol.)	Democratic socialism	Nichi Vendola
Democratic Centre (CD)	Christian left	Bruno Tabacci
Italian Socialist Party (PSI)	Social democracy	Riccardo Nencini
Moderates (Mod.)	Liberalism	Giacomo Portas

The coalition had the following regional partners:

Party	Region	Ideology	Leader
Autonomy Liberty Democracy (ALD) (Note: Including Progressive Valdostan Union (UVP) and Autonomy Liberty Participation Ecology (ALPE).)	Aosta Valley	Regionalism	Several
South Tyrolean People's Party (SVP) (Note: Including candidates of the Trentino Tyrolean Autonomist Party.) (Note: The SVP contested the election for the Senate in a joint list with the PD and the Union for Trentino in three out of six constituencies and with the PD in one constituency.)	Trentino-Alto Adige	Regionalism	Richard Theiner
The Megaphone – Crocetta List	Sicily	Regionalism	Rosario Crocetta

=== 2018 general election ===
In the 2018 Italian general election, the coalition was led by Matteo Renzi, and was composed of four electoral lists:

Party	Ideology	Leader
Democratic Party (PD) (Note: Including the Moderates.)	Social democracy	Matteo Renzi
More Europe (+E) (Note: Including the Italian Radicals, Forza Europa, the Democratic Centre and Progressive Area.)	Liberalism	Emma Bonino
Italy Europe Together (IEI) (Note: List composed of the Italian Socialist Party, the Federation of the Greens and Civic Area.)	Progressivism	Giulio Santagata
Popular Civic List (CP) (Note: List composed of Popular Alternative, Italy of Values, Centrists for Europe, Union for Trentino and Italy Is Popular; including also Solidary Democracy, Christian Popular Union and Popular Italy.)	Christian democracy	Beatrice Lorenzin

The coalition had the following regional partners:

Party	Region	Ideology	Leader
Valdostan Union (UV) (Note: It was part of the Aosta Valley list, along with the PD and other Valdostan parties.)	Aosta Valley	Regionalism	Ennio Pastoret
Progressive Valdostan Union (UVP)	Aosta Valley	Regionalism	Laurent Viérin
Valdostan Autonomist Popular Edelweiss (EPAV)	Aosta Valley	Regionalism	Mauro Baccega
South Tyrolean People's Party (SVP) (Note: SVP and PATT ran in a joint list.)	Trentino-Alto Adige	Regionalism	Philipp Achammer
Trentino Tyrolean Autonomist Party (PATT)	Trentino-Alto Adige	Regionalism	Franco Panizza

The centre-left coalition was also supported by the Ladin Autonomist Union and the Slovene Union.

=== 2022 general election ===
In the 2022 Italian general election, the alliance was formed by four parties:

Party	Ideology	Leader
Democratic Party – Democratic and Progressive Italy (PD–IDP) (Note: Including Democratic Party (PD), Article One (Art.1), Italian Socialist Party (PSI), Solidary Democracy (DemoS), European Republicans Movement (MRE), Volt Italy (Volt), Italian Base (BASE), Brave Emilia-Romagna, Italian Radicals, With Emiliano (CE), Centrists for Europe (CpE), For Apulia (XLP), Green Italia (GI), èViva and supported by Environment 2050.)	Social democracy	Enrico Letta
More Europe (+E) (Note: Including Forza Europa (FE) and Team K (TK).)	Liberalism	Emma Bonino
Civic Commitment (IC) (Note: Including Together for the Future (IpF), Democratic Centre (CD) and Innovative Democratic Socialist Proposal (PSDI).)	Centrism	Luigi Di Maio
Greens and Left Alliance (AVS) (Note: Including Italian Left (SI), Green Europe (EV), Possible (Pos), Environment Rights Equality (ADU), Greens of South Tyrol (Grüne) and Sardinian Progressives (PS).)	Eco-socialism	Angelo Bonelli

The coalition contested the election in some regions under the following banners:

Party	Region	Ideology	Leader
Aosta Valley (VdA) (Note: Joint list composed of Valdostan Union, Valdostan Alliance, Edelweiss, United Aosta Valley Democratic Party and Action – Italia Viva.)	Aosta Valley	Several	Several
Democratic Alliance for Autonomy (ADU) (Note: Joint list composed of Democratic Party, Greens and Left Alliance, More Europe, Action – Italia Viva and Campobase.)	Trentino-Alto Adige	Several	Several

There were regional agreements between the centre-left coalition and Action – Italia Viva in Trentino for the Senate election and in Aosta Valley for both Chamber and Senate elections. The Italian Left ran instead with the Five Star Movement and Democratic Area in Aosta Valley.

== Electoral results ==
=== Italian Parliament ===
Election	Leader	Chamber of Deputies					Senate of the Republic				
Election	Leader	Votes	%	Seats	+/–	Position	Votes	%	Seats	+/–	Position
1996	Romano Prodi	16,355,985	43.6	323 / 630	New	1st	14,548,006	44.6	167 / 315	New	1st
2001	Francesco Rutelli	16,209,944	43.5	247 / 630	▼75	▼2nd	13,282,495	39.2	128 / 315	▼41	▼2nd
2006	Romano Prodi	19,036,986	49.8	348 / 630	▲101	▲1st	17,118,364	49.2	158 / 315	▲30	2nd
2008	Walter Veltroni	13,689,303	37.5	239 / 630	▼109	▼2nd	12,457,182	38.7	130 / 315	▼28	2nd
2013	Pier Luigi Bersani	10,047,603	29.6	345 / 630	▲106	▲1st	9,686,683	31.6	127 / 315	▼3	▲1st
2018	Matteo Renzi	7,506,723	22.9	122 / 630	▼223	▼3rd	6,947,199	23.0	58 / 315	▼69	▼3rd
2022	Enrico Letta	7,337,975	26.1	85 / 400	▼37	▲2nd	7,161,688	25.4	44 / 200	▼14	▲2nd

=== Regional Councils ===
Region	Election year	Votes	%	Seats	+/−
Aosta Valley (Note: In Aosta Valley, the centre-left coalition ran divided and one of its affiliated lists included the Five Star Movement.)	2025	12,029	19.9	6 / 35	▼1
Piedmont	2024	582,399 (2nd)	35.2	17 / 51	▲3
Lombardy (Note: The centre-left coalition ran with the Five Star Movement.)	2023	945,148 (2nd)	32.8	24 / 80	▼7
South Tyrol (Note: In South Tyrol the centre-left coalition ran divided.)	2023	66,353	23.6	8 / 35	▼2
Trentino	2023	78,545 (2nd)	33.8	13 / 35	▲5
Veneto	2025	468,796 (2nd)	28.0	15 / 51	▲5
Friuli-Venezia Giulia	2023	117,469 (2nd)	29.7	18 / 49	Steady
Emilia-Romagna	2024	857,144 (1st)	57.4	34 / 50	▲5
Liguria	2024	269,186 (2nd)	47.9	13 / 31	▲1
Tuscany	2025	694,099 (1st)	54.6	25 / 41	Steady
Marche	2025	247,053 (2nd)	43.5	11 / 31	Steady
Umbria	2024	161,294 (1st)	50.2	13 / 21	▲5
Lazio	2023	519,066 (2nd)	33.6	15 / 50	▼9
Abruzzo	2024	262,565 (2nd)	45.3	12 / 31	Steady
Molise	2023	48,936 (2nd)	34.6	7 / 21	▼1
Campania	2025	1,229,922 (1st)	61.2	33 / 51	▼7
Apulia	2025	831,315 (1st)	62.6	30 / 51	▼3
Basilicata	2024	108,135 (2nd)	41.4	8 / 21	Steady
Calabria	2025	312,214 (2nd)	41.1	10 / 31	▲2
Sicily	2022	341,252 (3rd)	16.1	11 / 70	▼2
Sardinia	2024	293,288 (2nd) (Note: The centre-right coalition won the party vote but lost the presidential election.)	42.5	36 / 60	▲12
