= 2018 Valdostan regional election =

Election in Aosta Valley, Italy

- 20 May 2018
- All 35 seats to the Regional Council of Aosta Valley
- Turnout: 65.13%
Party	Leader	Vote %	Seats	+/–
UV	Augusto Rollandin	19.3%	7	−6
Lega	Nicoletta Spelgatti	17.1%	7	+7
PNV – SA	Antonio Fosson	10.7%	4	−1
UVP	Elisa Bonin	10.6%	4	−3
M5S	Davide Bono (ad interim)	10.4%	4	+2
ALPE	Alexis Vallet	9.0%	3	−2
IC	Elio Riccarand	7.5%	3	New
MOUV'	Mauro Caniggia Nicolotti	7.1%	3	New
This lists parties that won seats. See the complete results below.
President before	President after
Laurent Viérin; Progressive Valdostan Union	Nicoletta Spelgatti; League

The 2018 Valdostan regional election took place on 20 May 2018 in Aosta Valley, Italy.

== Background ==
The 2013 regional election confirmed the incumbent autonomist coalition government, led by the Valdostan Union (UV), which retained its absolute majority in the Regional Council of Aosta Valley. The coalition lost 14pp from 2008, however.

In July 2015 the regional government, which had been led by UV's Augusto Rollandin since 2008 (he had been President also in 1984–1990 and senator for Aosta Valley in 2001–2006), was enlarged to the centre-left Democratic Party (PD). In June 2016, after months of negotiations, the government was joined also by the Progressive Valdostan Union (UVP).

In March 2017 the UVP left the government and, along with Edelweiss (SA), Autonomy Liberty Participation Ecology (ALPE) and For Our Valley (PNV), formed a new government without the UV, under President Pierluigi Marquis (SA). Finally, in October, Marquis resigned and was replaced by UVP's Laurent Viérin at the head of a coalition composed of the UV, the UVP, the Valdostan Autonomist Popular Edelweiss (EPAV) and the PD.

== Parties and candidate ==
This is the list of parties that participated in the election.

Party	Ideology
Valdostan Union (Note: Including Valdostan Autonomist Popular Edelweiss (EPAV).) (UV)	Regionalism, Centrism
Progressive Valdostan Union (UVP)	Regionalism, Progressivism
Autonomy Liberty Participation Ecology (Note: Including Human Value Party (PVU).) (ALPE)	Regionalism, Social democracy
For Our Valley – Edelweiss (PNV–SA)	Regionalism, Christian democracy
Democratic Party – VdA Left (PD–SVdA)	Social democracy, Christian left
Five Star Movement (M5S)	Populism, Anti-establishment
Centre-right Aosta Valley (Note: Including Forza Italia, Brothers of Italy, New Aosta Valley.)	Conservatism, Liberal conservatism
League–Young Aosta Valley (Lega)	Regionalism, Right-wing populism
Civic Commitment (IC)	Regionalism, Democratic socialism
Mouv'	Regionalism, Progressivism

== Results ==
2018 Valdostan regional election results
Parties	Votes	%	Seats
Valdostan Union	12,265	19.25	7
League–Young Aosta Valley	10,872	17.06	7
For Our Valley – Edelweiss	6,792	10.66	4
Progressive Valdostan Union	6,750	10.59	4
Five Star Movement	6,652	10.44	4
Autonomy Liberty Participation Ecology	5,733	9.00	3
Civic Commitment	4,806	7.54	3
Mouv'	4,545	7.13	3
Democratic Party – VdA Left	3,436	5.39	–
Centre-right Aosta Valley	1,862	2.92	–
Valid votes	63,713	94.90	–
Blank votes	813	1.21	–
Invalid votes	2,612	3.89	–
Total	67,161	100.00	35
Registered voters/turnout	103,117	65.13	–
Source: Autonomous Region of Aosta Valley – Results

=== Popular vote by list ===
Popular vote
UV	19.25%
Lega	17.06%
AC–SA–PNV	10.66%
UVP	10.59%
M5S	10.44%
ALPE	9.00%
IC	7.54%
Mouv'	7.13%
PD	5.39%
CDVdA	2.92%
