= Ilario Lanivi =

Italian politician

Ilario Lanivi (born 16 April 1939) is an Italian politician from the Aosta Valley who has been highly involved in the formation of a number of political parties. He started his political career with the Christian Democrats.

== Biography ==
Lanivi parted ways with them in 1970 when a faction broke off to form the left-wing Popular Democrats, which merged with the Progressive Valdostan Union in 1984 to become Progressive Democratic Autonomists, of which Lanivi was a leading member. On 9 March 1991 Lanivi and Amato Maquignaz founded a new political party, the Independent Autonomists. In April 1992, Lanivi was elected president of the Aosta Valley region, heading a coalition composed by the Valdostan Union, the Democratic Party of the Left, the Italian Socialist Party, the Progressive Democratic Autonomists and the Italian Republican Party. In 1993, Lanivi founded For Aosta Valley together with Cesare Dujany, former leader of the Popular Democrats. In 2007, Lanivi and Augusto Rollandin were found guilty of mismanaging public transportation funds in the valley and fined EUR 300,000 and EUR 480,000 respectively

Preceded by Gianni Bondaz	List of presidents of Aosta Valley 1992 - 1993	Succeeded by Dino Viérin
