= Autonomies for Europe =

Autonomies for Europe Autonomie per l'Europa
- Leader: Marco Gheller
- Founded: March 2019
- Preceded by: Aosta Valley
- Ideology: Regionalism
- National affiliation: Centre-left coalition
- European affiliation: European Free Alliance
- Chamber of Deputies: 0 / 630
- Senate: 1 / 315
- European Parliament: 0 / 73
- Regional Governments: 1 / 20
- Regional Council: 15 / 35

Autonomies for Europe (Italian: Autonomie per l'Europa, ApE) was a regionalist coalition of parties formed in Aosta Valley, Italy in order to participate in the 2019 European Parliament election.

The coalition had a technical agreement with the Democratic Party (PD). ApE's candidate was Marco Gheller, who received also the support of Great North, Pro Lombardy Independence and other minor regional parties of northern Italy.

== Composition ==
The alliance is composed of the following five parties:

Party	Main ideology	Leader
Valdostan Union (UV)	Regionalism, Centrism	Erik Lavévaz
Progressive Valdostan Union (UVP)	Regionalism, Progressivism	Giuliano Morelli
Autonomy Liberty Participation Ecology (ALPE)	Regionalism, Social democracy	Roberto Cunéaz
Edelweiss (SA)	Regionalism, Christian democracy	Carlo Marzi
Valdostan Autonomist Popular Edelweiss (EPAV)	Regionalism, Centrism	Mauro Beccega

Originally, For Our Valley was supposed to join ApE, but finally backtracted. Also Mouv', an emerging regional party which would grow bigger in the 2020 regional election, refused to join the coalition.

== Electoral results ==
=== European Parliament ===
European Parliament
Election	Total					Aosta Valley		
Election	Votes	%	#	Seats	+/–	Votes	%	#
2019	17,629	0.07	17th	0 / 76	New	6,904	13.85	3rd
