= Autonomist Union =

Italian political party

Autonomist Union (Unione Autonomista, UA) was a regionalist Italian political party active in Aosta Valley.

== History ==
UA was launched in 1987 by Roberto Gremmo as the Valdostan emanation of Piedmontese Union (UP). Gremmo ran in the 1988 regional election in a list named Autonomist Union – Pensioners (Union Autonomista – Pensionati) without consulting his usual partners. It was perceived as a rude move toward the Valdostan Union, whose leadership of the autonomist camp in Aosta Valley was until then respected by Padanian autonomists. In the election UA won 1.6% of the vote and Gremmo was narrowly elected to the Regional Council. During the legislature, Gremmo questioned the regional government on several subjects, including that of foreign citizens accused of terrorism, transport safety in the town of Gignod, firearms laws and the representation of Walser minority in the regional assembly.

In 1989–1991 Gremmo, who was as also leader of UP in Piedmont, refused to participate to the founding process of Lega Nord and Gremmo's political career begun its decline, while Lega Nord would become the fourth largest party in the country in the 1992 general election. In the run-up of the election, Gremmo merged UP and UA into the Alpine League, which won just 0.7% in the 1993 regional election compared to the 7.6% of Lega Nord Valle d'Aosta.

== Leadership ==
- National Secretary: Roberto Gremmo (1987–1992)

== See also ==
- Piedmontese Union

== Bibliography ==
- GREMMO Roberto, Contro Roma. Storia, idee e programmi delle Leghe autonomiste del Nord, L’Union Autonomiste/La Lega Alpina, supplément du n° 167 (30 septembre 1992).
- Quaderni Padani, Bimestralle edito dalla Libera Compagnia Padana, Anno VI, N° 32 - Novembre-Dicembre 2000
