= UVP =

UVP may refer to:

- unique selling proposition, also called the unique selling point or the unique value proposition.
- Progressive Valdostan Union, a political party active between 1973 and 1984.
- Progressive Valdostan Union, a political party founded in 2013.
