= Progressive Valdostan Union =

Progressive Valdostan Union may refer to:

- Progressive Valdostan Union, a political party active between 1973 and 1984.
- Progressive Valdostan Union, a political party founded in 2013.
