= Rainbow Aosta Valley =

The Rainbow Aosta Valley (Arcobaleno Valle d'Aosta, AVdA) was an Italian coalition of parties active in Aosta Valley.

Launched in 2003, the coalition was composed of the Federation of the Greens (whose local section, the Alternative Greens, AVdA, was particularly strong in the Region), the Communist Refoundation Party, the Party of Italian Communists, Democratic Left and some local far-left groups. In the 2003 regional election the coalition won 7.9% of the vote and three regional councillors. In the 2008 regional election it obtained 5.6% of the vote and no regional councillors.

In 2010 AVdA, which had been part of Autonomy Liberty Democracy in general elections since 2006, distanced from the far left and were merged into a new party named Autonomy Liberty Participation Ecology (ALPE), along with other two progressive parties, Valdostan Renewal and Vallée d'Aoste Vive.
