= Valdostan Autonomist Popular Edelweiss =

The Valdostan Autonomist Popular Edelweiss (Italian: Edelweiss Popolare Autonomista Valdostano, EPAV) was a centrist political party active in Aosta Valley, Italy. The party was originally named Autonomist Popular Edelweiss (Stella Alpina Popolare Autonomista, SAPA).

The party was launched in March 2017 as a split from Edelweiss (SA), which had decided to stop supporting the government led by Augusto Rollandin of the Valdostan Union (UV) and, along with the Progressive Valdostan Union (UVP), Autonomy Liberty Participation Ecology (ALPE) and For Our Valley (PNV), later formed a new government under President Pierluigi Marquis (UV). The two founders of the EPAV were regional councillors Mauro Baccega and André Lanièce.

In October Marquis resigned and was replaced by Laurent Viérin (UVP) at the head of a coalition composed of the UV, the UVP, the EPAV and the PD.

In the 2018 regional election Baccega was re-elected from the UV's list. The EPAV, which was transformed into an association and changed its name into Valdostan Autonomist Popular Europeanists (Europeisti Popolari Autonomisti Valdostani) in November 2018, ceased to exist as an autonomous party and was amalgamated into the UV, especially after Baccega was appointed regional minister of Health, under President Antonio Fosson, in December 2018.

In the 2020 regional election Baccega was elected councillor for PlA, which obtained 6.4% of the vote and a total of three seats.
