= 1994 Italian general election in Aosta Valley =

The Italian general election of 1994 took place on 27 March 1994.

== Results ==
=== Chamber of Deputies ===
Candidate	Party/coalition	votes	%
Luciano Caveri	Aosta Valley (UV–PVdA)	43,700	54.1
Secondina Squarzino	Alliance of Progressives	17,942	22.2
Paolo Linty	Pole of Freedoms	13,902	17.2
Giancarlo Borluzzi	National Alliance	5,261	6.5
	Total	80,805	100.0

Source: Ministry of the Interior

=== Senate ===
Candidate	Party/coalition	votes	%
Cesare Dujany	Aosta Valley (UV–PVdA)	27,493	38.3
Piero Ferraris	Alliance of Progressives	15,134	21.1
Mario Maquignaz	ADP–APA–PPI–PRI–PS	13,255	18.5
Giovanni Sacco	Pole for Freedoms	12,640	17.6
Antonio Sella	National Alliance	3,319	4.6
	Total	71,841	100.0

Source: Ministry of the Interior
