= Independent Autonomists =

The Independent Autonomists (Autonomisti Indipendenti, AI) was a social-liberal Italian political party active in Aosta Valley.

It was founded in March 1991 by Ilario Lanivi, ex-leading member of the Progressive Democratic Autonomists, and Amato Maquignaz. In April 1992 Lanivi became President of the Region at the head of a coalition composed by the Valdostan Union, the Democratic Party of the Left, the Italian Socialist Party, the Progressive Democratic Autonomists and the Italian Republican Party.

For the 1993 regional election the Independent Autonomist joined forces with Cesare Dujany, former leader of the Popular Democrats, and launched the For Aosta Valley list. Since then the party ceased to exist.
