= PVDA =

PVDA, PvdA, or PVdA may refer to:

- For Aosta Valley (French: Pour la Vallée d'Aoste, PVdA), a former political party in the Aosta Valley region of Italy
- Labour Party (Netherlands) (Dutch: Partij van de Arbeid, PvdA), a former Dutch political party
- Workers' Party of Belgium (Dutch: Partij van de Arbeid van België, PVDA), a Belgian political party
