= Valdostan Rally =

Valdostan Rally may refer to two distinct political parties in Aosta Valley, Italy

- Valdostan Rally (1963)
- Valdostan Rally (2023)
