= 1978 Valdostan regional election =

Italian regional election

The Valdostan regional election of 1978 took place on 25 June 1978.

The council was divided in a dozen of parties, with consequent political instability under the leadership of the Valdostan Union.

== Results ==
| Party | votes | votes (%) | seats |
|---|---|---|---|
| Valdostan Union | 18,318 | 24.8 | 9 |
| Christian Democracy | 15,723 | 21.2 | 7 |
| Italian Communist Party | 14,442 | 19.5 | 6 |
| Popular Democrats | 8,702 | 11.8 | 4 |
| Italian Socialist Party | 2,648 | 3.6 | 1 |
| Progressive Valdostan Union | 2,316 | 3.1 | 1 |
| Socialist Autonomy | 1,960 | 2.7 | 1 |
| Italian Democratic Socialist Party | 1,543 | 2.1 | 1 |
| Proletarian Democracy | 1,454 | 2.0 | 1 |
| Italian Republican Party | 1,395 | 1.9 | 1 |
| Italian Liberal Party | 1,318 | 1.8 | 1 |
| Valdostan Craftsmen and Traders | 1,118 | 1.5 | 1 |
| Radical Party | 976 | 1.3 | - |
| Italian Social Movement | 949 | 1.3 | - |
| Others | 81,153 | 1.6 | - |
| Total | 74,015 | 100.0 | 35 |

Sources: Regional Council of Aosta Valley and Istituto Cattaneo
