= 2001 Italian general election in Aosta Valley =

The Italian general election of 2001 took place on 13 May 2001.

Both of Aosta Valley's seats to the Italian Parliament were won by the Aosta Valley coalition, composed of the Valdostan Union, Edelweiss and the Autonomist Federation.

== Results ==
=== Chamber of Deputies ===
Candidate	Party/coalition	votes	%
Ivo Collè	UV–SA–FA	25,577	35.0
Giulio Fiou	Democrats of the Left	20,452	28.0
Gianloreto Angeli	Forza Italia–Lega Nord	16,049	21.9
Elio Riccarand	Alternative List	6,612	9.0
Alberto Zucchi	National Alliance	4,464	6.1
	Total	73,154	100.0

Source: Ministry of the Interior

=== Senate ===
Candidate	Party/coalition	votes	%
Augusto Rollandin	UV–SA–FA	32,429	49.3
Licurgo Pasquali	Forza Italia–Lega Nord	14,817	22.5
Alessandro Bortot	Alternative List	7,704	11.7
Silvino Morosso	Communist Refoundation Party	7,128	10.8
Domenico Aloisi	National Alliance	3,686	5.6
	Total	65,764	100.0

Source: Ministry of the Interior
