= 1994 European Parliament election in Aosta Valley =

The European Parliament election of 1994 took place in Aosta Valley, as well as the rest of Italy, on 12 June 1994.

The Federalismo coalition of Valdostan Union failed to win a seat.

== Results ==
=== Regional level ===
Party	Votes	%
Federalismo (Valdostan Union)	19,658	32.32
Forza Italia	14,896	24.49
Democratic Party of the Left	6,143	10.10
Italian People's Party	3,699	6.08
Lega Nord (incl. LNVdA)	3,486	5.73
Federation of the Greens (incl. AV)	3,108	5.11
Communist Refoundation Party	3,071	5.05
National Alliance	2,852	4.69
Pannella List	1,342	2.21
Segni Pact	954	1.57
Italian Socialist Party–Democratic Alliance	351	0.58
Southern Action League	332	0.55
Federation of Liberals	261	0.43
Italian Democratic Socialist Party	189	0.31
Italian Republican Party	177	0.29
Lega Alpina Lumbarda	173	0.28
The Network	139	0.23
Total	60,831	100.00
Valid votes	60,831	88.81
Invalid/blank votes	7,664	11.19
Total votes	68,495	100.00
Registered voters/turnout	98,801	69.33
Source: Ministry of the Interior
