= 2014 European Parliament election in Aosta Valley =

The European Parliament election of 2014 took place in Italy on 25 May 2014.

In Aosta Valley the centre-left Democratic Party, endorsed by the Progressive Valdostan Union and Autonomy Liberty Participation Ecology, came largely ahead with 47.1% of the vote, followed by the Five Star Movement, a distant second at 19.6%. The two parties forming the regional government, namely the Valdostan Union and Edelweiss, did not participate in or endorse any list. This likely favoured Lega Nord, which gained 6.8% of the vote, its best tally in the region since 1996. Among other lists, Forza Italia obtained 10.3% and The Other Europe 7.7%. PD–UVP–ALPE's Luca Barbieri was the most voted candidate in the region with 8,128 preference votes.

== Results ==
Party	Votes	%
Democratic Party	21,854	47.1
Five Star Movement	9,096	19.6
Forza Italia	4,765	10.3
The Other Europe	3,569	7.7
Lega Nord	3,170	6.8
New Centre-Right – Union of the Centre	1,491	3.2
Brothers of Italy	1,177	2.5
European Greens – Green Italia	491	1.1
Italy of Values	401	0.9
European Choice	347	0.7
I Change – MAIE	65	0.1
Total	46,426	100.00

Source: Ministry of the Interior
