= 2008 Italian general election in Aosta Valley =

The Italian general election of 2008 took place on 13–14 April 2008.

In the Aosta Valley single-seat constituency Roberto Nicco, the incumbent deputy for the centre-left Autonomy Liberty Democracy, was narrowly re-elected, while incumbent senator Carlo Perrin (Valdostan Renewal, Autonomy Liberty Democracy) was defeated by Antonio Fosson (Valdostan Union, Aosta Valley coalition). The parliamentary delegation of Aosta Valley was thus split between the centre-left and the regionalist coalition led by Valdostan Union.

== Results ==
=== Chamber of Deputies ===
Candidate	Party/coalition	votes	%
Roberto Nicco	Autonomy Liberty Democracy	29,311	39.1
Ego Perron	Aosta Valley coalition	28,349	37.8
Giuseppe Gambardella	The People of Freedom	13,877	18.5
Patrizio Giovannacci	Lega Nord Valle d'Aosta	2,322	3.1
Giancarlo Borluzzi	Social Action	1,066	1.4
	Total	74,925	100.0

Source: Ministry of the Interior

=== Senate ===
Candidate	Party/coalition	votes	%
Antonio Fosson	Aosta Valley coalition	29,186	41.4
Carlo Perrin	Autonomy Liberty Democracy	26,375	37.4
Anacleto Benin	The People of Freedom	12,166	17.3
Sergio Ferrero	Lega Nord Valle d'Aosta	2,081	3.0
Marinella Monza	Social Action	712	1.0
	Total	70,520	100.0

Source: Ministry of the Interior
