= Arcobaleno =

Arcobaleno means rainbow in Italian. Specifically it may refer to:

- Arcobaleno Records, a record label based in the UK and founded in 2005 by Serge Santiágo
- Arcobaleno (film), a 1943 Italian film
- Arcobaleno selvaggio, a 1984 Italian film
- Arcobaleno Valle d'Aosta, a coalition of political parties active in Italy's Aosta Valley
- Arcobaleno (Reborn), a group of characters of the Reborn! anime and manga series
- Arcobaleno (tariff), a public transport fare tariff used in the Swiss canton of Ticino
- Linea arcobaleno, a railway line that forms part of the Naples Metro
