= 1983 Valdostan regional election =

Italian regional election

The Valdostan regional election of 1983 took place on 26 June 1983.

The Valdostan Union and the Christian Democracy made a centrist agreement, but judiciary problems affected the administration.

== Results ==
Party	votes	votes (%)	seats
Valdostan Union	20,495	27.1	9
Christian Democracy	15,973	21.1	7
Italian Communist Party	13,567	17.9	6
Popular Democrats–UVP	7,891	10.4	4
Italian Socialist Party	5,902	7.8	3
Italian Democratic Socialist Party	2,418	3.2	1
Italian Liberal Party	2,264	3.0	1
Italian Republican Party	1,905	2.5	1
New Left	1,661	2.2	1
Italian Social Movement	1,474	2.0	1
Valdostan Craftsmen and Traders	1,239	1.6	1
Free Zone List	852	1.1	-
Total	75,641	100.0	35

Sources: Regional Council of Aosta Valley and Istituto Cattaneo
