= 2006 Italian general election in Aosta Valley =

The Italian general election of 2006 took place on 9–10 April 2006.

In the Aosta Valley single-seat constituency Roberto Nicco (Democrats of the Left, Autonomy Liberty Democracy) was elected deputy, while incumbent senator Augusto Rollandin (Valdostan Union, Aosta Valley coalition) was defeated by Carlo Perrin (Valdostan Renewal, Autonomy Liberty Democracy).

== Results ==
=== Chamber of Deputies ===
Candidate	Party/coalition	votes	%
Roberto Nicco	Autonomy Liberty Democracy	34,168	43.4
Marco Viérin	Aosta Valley coalition	24,119	30.7
Massimo Lattanzi	Forza Italia–National Alliance	13,374	17.0
Luca Bringhen	Union of Christian and Centre Democrats	2,282	2.9
Alessandra Mussolini	Social Alternative	1,587	2.0
Vincenzo Falco	Lega Nord Valle d'Aosta	1,566	2.0
Marco Bertone	Pensioners' Party	1,135	1.4
Marcello Pierantonio	Tricolour Flame	430	0.6
	Total	78,661	100.0

Source: Ministry of the Interior

=== Senate ===
Candidate	Party/coalition	votes	%
Carlo Perrin	Autonomy Liberty Democracy	32,554	44.2
Augusto Rollandin	Aosta Valley coalition	23,574	32.0
Luigi Magnani	Forza Italia–National Alliance	11,505	15.6
Luigi Bracci	Union of Christian and Centre Democrats	2,264	3.1
Sergio Ferrero	Lega Nord Valle d'Aosta	1,574	2.1
Silvio Pedullà	Pensioners' Party	1,046	1.4
Giancarlo Borluzzi	Social Alternative	775	1.1
Eusebio Margara	Tricolour Flame	416	0.6
	Total	73.708	100.0

Source: Ministry of the Interior
