= 1973 Valdostan regional election =

Italian regional election

The Valdostan regional election of 1973 took place on 10 June 1973.

The alliance of 1970 was initially confirmed, but the situation was later changed by the Valdostan Union and the Christian Democracy.

== Results ==
Party	votes	votes (%)	seats
Popular Democrats	15,643	22.4	8
Christian Democracy	14,980	21.4	7
Italian Communist Party	13,638	19.5	7
Valdostan Union	8,081	11.6	4
Italian Socialist Party	5,975	8.5	3
Progressive Valdostan Union	4,707	6.7	2
Italian Liberal Party	2,052	2.9	1
Italian Social Movement	1,452	2.1	1
Italian Democratic Socialist Party	1,409	2.0	1
Valdostan Rally	1,149	1.6	1
Italian Republican Party	1,149	1.6	1
Total	69,990	100.0	35

Sources: Regional Council of Aosta Valley and Istituto Cattaneo
