= 1993 Valdostan regional election =

Italian regional election

The Valdostan regional election of 1993 took place on 6 June 1993.

The Valdostan Union made an agreement with the Democratic Party of the Left.

== Results ==
Party	votes	votes (%)	seats
Valdostan Union	30,312	37.3	13
Christian Democracy	12,091	14.9	5
Democratic Party of the Left	6,987	8.6	3
Northern League Aosta Valley	6,176	7.6	3
Alternative Greens	5,816	7.2	3
Progressive Democratic Autonomists–PRI	5,247	6.5	2
For Aosta Valley	3,527	4.3	2
Autonomist People's Alliance	3,234	4.0	2
Italian Socialist Party	3,132	3.9	1
Communist Refoundation Party	2,817	3.5	1
Italian Social Movement	1,390	1.7	-
Lega Alpina	603	0.7	-
Total	81,332	100.0	35

Sources: Regional Council of Aosta Valley and Istituto Cattaneo
