= 2003 Valdostan regional election =

Italian regional election

- 8 June 2003
- All 35 seats to the Regional Council of Aosta Valley; 18 seats needed for a majority
- Turnout: 77.17%
| Party | Vote % | Seats | +/– |
|---|---|---|---|
| UV | 47.2% | 18 | +1 |
| SA | 19.8% | 7 | +2 |
| DS | 9.7% | 4 | +1 |
| CdL | 9.4% | 3 | 0 |
| Rainbow | 7.9% | 3 | New |
This lists parties that won seats. See the complete results below.
| President before | President after |
|---|---|
| Roberto Louvin; UV | Carlo Perrin; UV |

The Valdostan regional election of 2003 took place on 8 June 2003. The election was characterized by a strong showing of the centrist Valdostan Union, which gained more than 47% of votes.

== Results ==
2003 Valdostan regional election results
| Parties | Votes | % | Seats |
|---|---|---|---|
| Valdostan Union | 35,297 | 47.23 | 18 |
| Edelweiss | 14,817 | 19.83 | 7 |
| Democrats of the Left | 7,248 | 9.70 | 4 |
| House of Freedoms (incl. FI, AN, LN) | 7,041 | 9.42 | 3 |
| Rainbow Aosta Valley (incl. VAVdA, PRC, IdV, CdV, SA) | 5,897 | 7.89 | 3 |
| Alé Vallée | 3,539 | 4.74 | – |
| Valdostan Right | 346 | 0.46 | – |
| Walser Union | 277 | 0.37 | – |
| Together | 265 | 0.35 | – |
| Total | 74,727 | 100.0 | 35 |
Source: Aosta Valley Region – Results
