= Severino Caveri =

Italian politician (1908–1977)

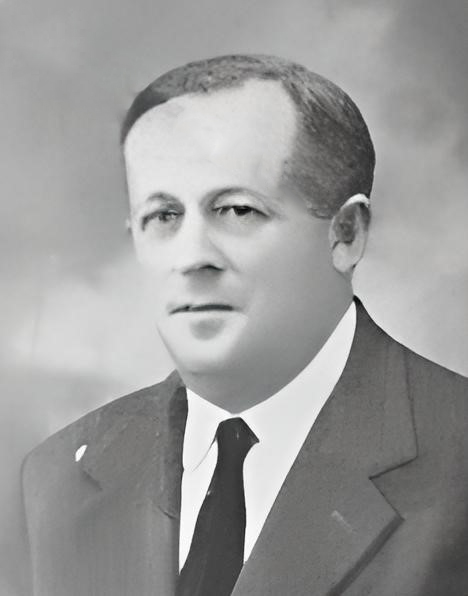

President of Aosta Valley
- In office 24 November 1963 – 30 May 1966
- Preceded by: Oreste Marcoz
- Succeeded by: Cesare Bionaz
- In office 24 October 1946 – 8 December 1954
- Preceded by: Federico Chabod
- Succeeded by: Vittorino Bondaz

President of the Regional Council of Aosta Valley
- In office 30 January 1975 – 19 December 1977
- Preceded by: Giulio Dolchi
- Succeeded by: Giulio Dolchi

Deputy of the Italian Republic
- In office 12 June 1958 – 15 May 1963
- Constituency: Aosta Valley

Member of the Regional Council of Aosta Valley
- In office 25 November 1963 – 19 December 1977
- In office 10 January 1946 – 8 December 1954

Personal details
- Born: May 29, 1908 Ivrea, Turin, Italy
- Died: December 19, 1977 (aged 69)
- Party: Action Party (until 1946); Valdostan Union (1946–1977)

Severino Caveri (29 May 1908 – 19 December 1977), also referred to as Séverin Caveri, was an Italian politician who served as president of Aosta Valley from 1946 to 1954, and again from 1963 to 1966. He was one of the co-founders of the Valdostan Union party, as well as serving as a national deputy from 1958 to 1963, as the president of the Regional Council of Aosta Valley from 1975 until his death in 1977.

== Life and career ==
Caveri was born in Ivrea in 1908. He was first elected to the Regional Council of Aosta Valley in January 1946. He was elected to the regional presidency in October 1946, where he served until 1954. In 1946, he co-founded the Valdostan Union party and served as its president until 1972. He was elected to the Chamber of Deputies from the Aosta Valley constituency in 1958, serving until 1963. He was then reelected to the Regional Council of Aosta Valley in 1963, again serving as president from 1963 until 1966. In 1975, he served as president of the Regional Council in 1975 until his death in 1977.

== Legacy ==
On December 19, 2017, the 40th anniversary of Caveri's death, the Regional Council of Aosta Valley held a dinner honoring him, including a speech by Regional Council president Andrea Rosset.
