= Progressive Valdostan Union (2013) =

Italian political party

Progressive Valdostan Union Union Valdôtaine Progressiste
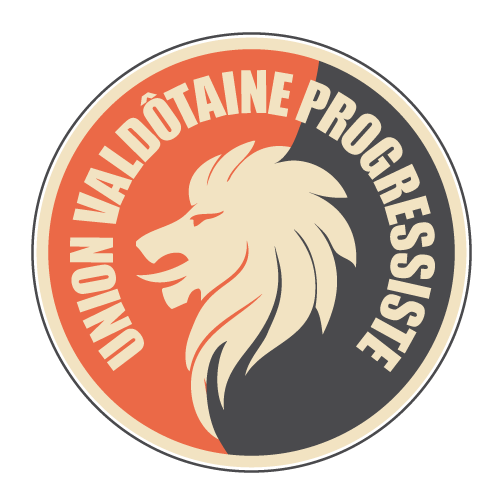
- President: Giuliano Morelli
- Founded: 26 January 2013
- Dissolved: 2 April 2019
- Split from: Valdostan Union
- Merged into: Valdostan Alliance
- Succeeded by: Mouv' (faction)
- Headquarters: 87, Pont-Suaz; Charvensod
- Newspaper: Le Progressiste
- Ideology: Regionalism; Progressivism; Social liberalism
- Political position: Centre-left
- National affiliation: Centre-left coalition
- Regional affiliation: Autonomies for Europe

Website
- Archived Website

The Progressive Valdostan Union (French: Union Valdôtaine Progressiste, UVP) was a centre-left political party active in the Aosta Valley, Italy. Leading members were Laurent Viérin, Luigi Bertschy and Giuliano Morelli.

== History ==
The party emerged in January 2013 as a split from the Valdostan Union (UV), similarly to what had happened forty years before with the historical UVP. Over the years the UV had become more acquainted with the centre-right and this caused the exit of three regional councillors (Luciano Caveri, Laurent Viérin and Andrea Rosset), who launched the UVP on 4 January 2013. The party's first president was Claudio Brédy, who was succeeded by Alessia Favre in 2014.

In the 2013 general election Viérin obtained 25.1% of the vote and missed the election to the Chamber of Deputies for less than 200 votes. In the 2013 regional election UVP obtained 19.2% of the vote and 7 seats in the Regional Council.

In March 2016, during its congress, the party elected Luigi Bertschy as new president. The following June, after months of negotiations, the UVP joined the regional government led by UV's Augusto Rollandin, with Viérin minister of Health, fueling rumors of a re-unification with the UV. The move was opposed by Caveri and Brédy, who left the party in protest. In August also Elso Gérandin, regional councillor and former deputy floor leader, left the party. Caveri, Brédy and Gérandin later launched an alternative centre-left party named Mouv', which would be later joined by Rosset and two dissident regional councillors of the Five Star Movement (M5S).

However, in March 2017 the UVP left the government and, along with Edelweiss (SA), Autonomy Liberty Participation Ecology (ALPE) and For Our Valley (PNV), formed a new government without the UV, under President Pierluigi Marquis (SA), with Viérin Vice President and minister of Agriculture and Bertschy minister of Health.

The following June, during a congress, the UVP elected Elisa Bonin as its new president. Bonin re-launched the proposal of a new joint autonomist party, formed primarily by the UV and the UVP, while criticising ALPE. In October Marquis resigned and was replaced by UVP's Viérin at the head of a coalition composed of the UV, the UVP (two ministers: Bertschy at Health and Alessandro Nogara at Agriculture), the Valdostan Autonomist Popular Edelweiss (EPAV) and the PD.

In the 2018 general election the UVP was part of Aosta Valley coalition, along with the UV, the PD and the EPAV, and Favre was the alliance's candidate for the Chamber, but was defeated by the M5S candidate in a fractured field. In the 2018 regional election the UVP won 10.6% of the vote, while the Mouv' gained 7.1%. After the election, the Regional Council elected Nicoletta Spelgatti of Lega Nord Valle d'Aosta as President, at the head of a broad coalition comprising also the Mouv'. However, in December the government was replaced by a new one led by Antonio Fosson (PNV), at the head of a coalition composed of the UV, the UVP, ALPE, SA and PNV: Viérin was appointed minister of Tourism, Sport, Commerce, Agriculture and Cultural Heritage, while Bertschy minister of European Affairs, Labour Policies, Social Inclusion and Transports.

In February 2019 Giuliano Morelli, whose political program featured the formation of a joint autonomist party, was elected as UVP's new president. Consistently with the line traced by Morelli, two months later the UVP formed a joint group with ALPE named "Valdostan Alliance".

== Popular support ==
The electoral results of the UVP in Aosta Valley are shown in the table below.

| 2013 general | 2013 regional | 2014 European | 2018 general | 2018 regional |
| 25.1 | 19.2 | with PD | within VdA | 10.6 |

=== Regional elections ===
| Election | Votes | % | Seats | +/– |
|---|---|---|---|---|
| 2013 | 13,843 | 19.21 | 7 / 35 | New |
| 2018 | 6,750 | 10.59 | 4 / 35 | ▼3 |

== Leadership ==
- President: Claudio Brédy (2013–2014), Alessia Favre (2014–2016), Luigi Bertschy (2016–2017), Elisa Bonin (2017–2018), Giuliano Morelli (2019)
