= 1998 Valdostan regional election =

Italian regional election

- 31 May 1998
- All 35 seats to the Regional Council of Aosta Valley; 18 seats needed for a majority
- Turnout: 81.9%
Party	Vote %	Seats	+/–
UV	42.6%	17	+4
Autonomists	12.8%	5	0
FA	9.7%	4	New
DS	8.3%	3	0
PVAcU	6.8%	3	+1
FI	6.5%	3	New
This lists parties that won seats. See the complete results below.
President before	President after
Dino Viérin; UV	Dino Viérin; UV

The Valdostan regional election of 1998 took place on 31 May 1998.

== Results ==
Party	votes	votes (%)	seats
Valdostan Union	33,311	42.6	17
Autonomists	10,044	12.8	5
Autonomist Federation	7,561	9.7	4
Democrats of the Left	6,455	8.3	3
For Aosta Valley with The Olive Tree (incl. Greens)	5,323	6.8	3
Forza Italia	5,088	6.5	3
Communist Refoundation Party	3,760	4.8	-
Northern League Aosta Valley	2,653	3.4	-
National Alliance	2,237	2.9	-
others	1,822	2.3	-
Total	78,254	100.0	35

Sources: Regional Council of Aosta Valley and Istituto Cattaneo
