= Vallée d'Aoste Vive =

- Leader: Roberto Louvin
- Secretary: Guido Dondeynaz
- Founded: 4 December 2005
- Dissolved: 12 February 2010
- Split from: Valdostan Union
- Merged into: Autonomy Liberty Participation Ecology
- Headquarters: via De Tillier, 12; 11100 Aosta
- Ideology: Regionalism; Social liberalism Social democracy

Website
- www.aostaviva.it

Vallée d'Aoste Vive (translatable as Aosta Valley Alive, VdAV) was a social-liberal Italian political party active in the Aosta Valley. It was founded on 4 December 2005 by a left-wing split from the Valdostan Union and its leader was Roberto Louvin.

For the 2006 general election, the Lively Aosta Valley took part to the Autonomy Liberty Democracy (ALD) coalition, alongside the Democrats of the Left, The Daisy, Valdostan Renewal, the Communist Refoundation Party, the Federation of the Greens and other minor parties.

In the 2008 regional election the party formed a joint list with Valdostan Renewal: the list won 12.5% of the vote and 5 regional deputies (out of 35), of which 2 of VdAV. ALD was however severely defeated by the Aosta Valley coalition.

In February 2010 VdAV agreed to merge into a new party named Autonomy Liberty Participation Ecology (ALPE), along with Valdostan Renewal, Alternative Greens and other centre-left groups.
