= 2013 Valdostan regional election =

Italian regional election

- 26 May 2013
- All 35 seats to the Regional Council of Aosta Valley
- Turnout: 73.03%
Party	Leader	Vote %	Seats	+/–
UV	Ego Perron	33.5%	13	−4
UVP	Claudio Brédy	19.2%	7	New
ALPE	Carlo Perrin	12.4%	2	New
SA	Maurizio Martin	12.3%	4	0
PD	Raimondo Donzel	8.9%	3	0
M5S	Stefano Ferrero	6.5%	2	New
This lists parties that won seats. See the complete results below.
President before	President after
Augusto Rollandin; UV	Augusto Rollandin; UV

The Valdostan regional election of 2013 confirmed the incumbent autonomist centre-right coalition government, led by the Valdostan Union which retained its absolute majority in the Regional Council of Aosta Valley. The coalition lost 14% percentage points compared to 2008 to the Autonomist centre-left coalition, however.

== Results ==
The Valdostan regional election of 2013 took place on 26 May 2013 in the Aosta Valley. The incumbent coalition government, by the Valdostan Union together with autonomist Edelweiss (SA) and the Autonomist Federation retained its majority in the Regional Council of Aosta Valley for the 8th time in a row. Since 2008, the coalition lost 14 percentage points to the Autonomist centre-left coalition, composed mainly by the Progressive Valdotanian Union (UVP) and the Autonomy Liberty Participation Ecology, ALPE). The center-left coalition grew from 27.4% of the vote to 40.5%.

In March 2017, SA left the government and, along with the UVP, Autonomy Liberty Participation Ecology (ALPE) and For Our Valley (PNV), formed a new government without the UV, under President Pierluigi Marquis (SA).

2013 Aosta Valley regional election results
Coalition	Parties	Votes	%	Seats
Aosta Valley	Valdostan Union	24,121	33.47	13
Aosta Valley	Edelweiss (incl. LN)	8,824	12.25	5
Aosta Valley	Autonomist Federation (incl. UdC)	1,572	2.18	–
Aosta Valley	Total	34,517	47.90	18
Autonomy Liberty Democracy	Progressive Valdostan Union	13,843	19.21	7
Autonomy Liberty Democracy	Autonomy Liberty Participation Ecology	8,943	12.41	5
Autonomy Liberty Democracy	Democratic Party – VdA Left (incl. SEL, PSI, PRC, IdV, CD)	6,401	8.88	3
Autonomy Liberty Democracy	Total	29,187	40.50	15
Five Star Movement		4,773	6.52	2
The People of Freedom		2,961	4.21	–
Legality Autonomy and Freedom		622	0.86	–
Total		72,060	100.0	35
Source: Aosta Valley Region – Results

Popular vote (parties)
UV	33.5%
UVP	19.2%
ALPE	12.4%
SA	12.3%
PD–VdA Left	8.9%
M5S	6.5%
PdL	4.2%
FA	2.1%
LeAli	0.9%

Popular vote (coalitions)
VdA	47.9%
ALD	40.5%
M5S	6.5%
CDX	4.2%
LeAli	0.9%
