= 1953 Italian general election in Aosta Valley =

- 7 June 1953

The 1953 Italian general election took place on 7 June 1953. In its two single-seat constituencies, Aosta Valley elected Paul-Alphonse Farinet of Christian Democracy (DC) to the Chamber of Deputies, and Ernest Page (DC) to the Senate.

== Results ==
Chamber of Deputies

Candidate	Party or alliance		Votes	%
Paul-Alphonse Farinet	DC-PSDI-PLI	DC	27,607	53.29
Lino Binel	Valdostan Democratic Autonomist Union (PCI-PSI)	Independent	21,920	42.32
Unknown	none	MSI	2,274	4.39
Total			51,801	100.00
Valid votes			51,801	94.31
Invalid/blank votes			3,124	5.69
Total votes			54,925	100.00
Registered voters/turnout			63,346	86.71

Senate

Candidate	Party or alliance		Votes	%
Ernest Page	DC-PLI	DC	25,481	55.07
Giovanni Pietro Carral	Aosta Autonomy – Peace (PCI-PSI)	PCI	16,873	36.47
Carlo Fetterappa Sandri	none	MSI	2,121	4.58
Fortunio Palmas	none	PSDI	1,792	3.87
Total			46,267	100.00
Valid votes			46,267	94.21
Invalid/blank votes			2,844	5.79
Total votes			49,111	100.00
Registered voters/turnout			57,387	85.58

== See also ==
- 1953 Italian general election
