= 1963 Valdostan regional election =

Italian regional election

The Valdostan regional election of 1963 took place on 27 October 1963.

Proportional representation became the standard electoral system in Italy, and it was adopted in Aosta Valley for the first time. The result was political instability, while political corruption arose.

The alliance of 1959 was initially confirmed, but in 1966 the Socialist Party changed side and allied with the Christian Democracy.

== Results ==
Party	votes	votes (%)	seats
Christian Democracy	23,695	37.4	13
Italian Communist Party	15,374	24.3	9
Valdostan Union	12,930	20.4	7
Italian Socialist Party	3,170	5.0	2
Italian Liberal Party	3,136	5.0	2
Valdostan Independent Rally	2,077	3.3	1
Italian Democratic Socialist Party	1,628	2.6	1
Italian Social Movement	682	1.1	-
Valdostan Democratic Union	634	1.0	-
Total	63,326	100.0	35

Sources: Regional Council of Aosta Valley and Istituto Cattaneo
