= Democratic Federation (Sardinia) =

Political party in Italy

Democratic Federation (Italian: Federazione Democratica, FD) was a regionalist social-democratic political party in Sardinia, Italy.

It was launched in 1994 by members of the Italian Socialist Party, the Italian Democratic Socialist Party and the Italian Republican Party, after those parties were severely damaged by the Tangentopoli scandals. The leader of the new party was Antonello Cabras, a Socialist who had been President of Sardinia from 1991 to 1994. In the 1994 regional election FD won 5.2% of the vote and elected 4 regional deputies.

In 1998 the party and other groups merged with the Democratic Party of the Left (PDS) to form the Democrats of the Left (DS), of which it became a regional faction. In the 1999 regional election, because of its political autonomy within the DS, FD presented an autonomous list and won 5.8% of the vote, electing 4 regional deputies.

Since 1996 FD has been represented in the Italian Parliament by Antonello Cabras and by Giovanni Murineddu. When the DS merged into the Democratic Party (PD) in 2007, Cabras was elected regional secretary of the party, defeating Renato Soru, President of the Region.

== Leadership ==
- President: Antonello Cabras (1994–2000), Franco Mannoni (2000–2007)
