= 2009 European Parliament election in Aosta Valley =

The European Parliament election of 2009 took place on 6–7 June 2009. The Aosta Valley coalition, hegemonized by the Valdostan Union, was the most voted in Aosta Valley with 37.1%, but received no seats, while Autonomy Liberty Democracy came distant second (18.5%).

== Results ==
Party	votes	votes (%)
Aosta Valley coalition	20,686	37.1
Autonomy Liberty Democracy	10,320	18.5
The People of Freedom	8,103	14.3
Democratic Party	7,161	12.8
Lega Nord	2,445	4.4
Italy of Values	2,297	4.1
Anticapitalist List (PRC–PdCI)	1,270	2.3
Bonino-Pannella List	1,109	2.0
Union of the Centre	1,093	2.0
Others	979	2.3
Total	55,759	100.0

Source: Ministry of the Interior
