= Alternative Greens =

Italian political party

The Alternative Greens (Verdi Alternativi) was a green political party in Aosta Valley, which used to be the regional section of the Federation of the Greens.

Its main leaders were Elio Riccarand, founder and coordinator until 2008, and Paolo Fedi, coordinator from 2008 to 2010.

Riccarand, who had been elected with the "New Left" list in the 1988 regional election, switched his affiliation to "Alternative Green" in 1990. In the 1993 regional election the party won 7.2% of the vote and three regional councillors, including Riccarand, who served as regional minister of the Environment for five years.

In the 1998 regional election the party teamed up with For Aosta Valley, which obtained 6.8% of the vote, and had two regional councillors elected.

The Alternative Greens were the major force within the Rainbow Aosta Valley (AVdA) left-wing coalition, which included also the Communist Refoundation Party, the Party of Italian Communists, Democratic Left (since 2007) and several minor local groups. In the 2003 regional election the coalition won 7.9% of the vote and three regional councillors. In the 2008 regional election it obtained 5.6% of the vote and no regional councillors.

In 2010 the Alternative Greens, which had been part of Autonomy Liberty Democracy in general elections since 2006, distanced from the far left and were merged into a new party named Autonomy Liberty Participation Ecology (ALPE), along with other two progressive parties, Valdostan Renewal and Vallée d'Aoste Vive.
