= 1949 Valdostan regional election =

Italian regional election

The Valdostan regional election of 1949 took place on 24 April 1949. The National Liberation Committee of Italy had granted in 1946 a special autonomy to Aosta Valley, later confirmed by the Italian Constitution of 1948.

== Results ==
Electoral system: limited voting (jackpot for winners: 28 seats)

Party	votes	votes (%)	seats
Christian Democracy – Valdostan Union	17,118	43.6	28
Italian Socialist Party – Italian Communist Party	13,034	33.2	7
Aosta Valley Regional Rally	6,533	16.6	-
Italian Democratic Group	2,598	6.6	-
Total	39,283	100.0	35

Sources: Regional Council of Aosta Valley and Istituto Cattaneo
