= List of presidents of Aosta Valley =

This is the list of presidents of Aosta Valley since 1946.

Presidents of the Aosta Valley region
President	Party	Term	Legislature
Federico Chabod	Action Party	10 January 1946 – 24 October 1946	Provisional
Severino Caveri	Valdostan Union	24 October 1946 – 20 May 1949	Provisional
Severino Caveri	Valdostan Union	20 May 1949 – 8 December 1954	I Legislature
Vittorino Bondaz	Christian Democracy	8 December 1954 – 16 June 1959	II Legislature
Oreste Marcoz	Valdostan Union	16 June 1959 – 24 November 1963	III Legislature
Severino Caveri	Valdostan Union	24 November 1963 – 30 May 1966	IV Legislature
Cesare Bionaz	Christian Democracy	30 May 1966 1966 – 20 May 1968	IV Legislature
Cesare Bionaz	Christian Democracy	20 May 1968 – 1 July 1969	V Legislature
Mauro Bordon	Christian Democracy	1 July 1969 – 7 April 1970	V Legislature
Cesare Dujany	Popular Democrats	7 April 1970 – 19 July 1973	V Legislature
Cesare Dujany	Popular Democrats	19 July 1973 – 15 November 1974	VI Legislature
Mario Andrione	Valdostan Union	20 December 1974 – 18 July 1978	VI Legislature
Mario Andrione	Valdostan Union	18 July 1978 – 20 July 1983	VII Legislature
Mario Andrione	Valdostan Union	20 July 1983 – 4 January 1984	VIII Legislature
Augusto Rollandin	Valdostan Union	4 January 1984 – 26 July 1988	VIII Legislature
Augusto Rollandin	Valdostan Union	26 July 1988 – 25 June 1990	IX Legislature
Gianni Bondaz	Christian Democracy	25 June 1990 – 3 June 1992	IX Legislature
Ilario Lanivi	Independent Autonomists	3 June 1992 – 29 June 1993	IX Legislature
Dino Viérin	Valdostan Union	29 June 1993 – 29 June 1998	X Legislature
Dino Viérin	Valdostan Union	29 June 1998 – 18 December 2002	XI Legislature
Roberto Louvin	Valdostan Union	18 December 2002 – 7 July 2003	XI Legislature
Carlo Perrin	Valdostan Union	7 July 2003 – 4 July 2005	XII Legislature
Luciano Caveri	Valdostan Union	4 July 2005 – 30 June 2008	XII Legislature
Augusto Rollandin	Valdostan Union	30 June 2008 – 30 June 2013	XIII Legislature
Augusto Rollandin	Valdostan Union	30 June 2013 – 10 March 2017	XIV Legislature
Pierluigi Marquis	Edelweiss	10 March 2017 – 11 October 2017	XIV Legislature
Laurent Viérin	Progressive Valdostan Union	11 October 2017 – 27 June 2018	XIV Legislature
Nicoletta Spelgatti	Aosta Valley League	27 June 2018 – 10 December 2018	XV Legislature
Antonio Fosson	For Our Valley	10 December 2018 – 16 December 2019	XV Legislature
Renzo Testolin	Valdostan Union	16 December 2019 – 21 October 2020	XV Legislature
Erik Lavévaz	Valdostan Union	21 October 2020 – 25 January 2023	XVI Legislature
Renzo Testolin	Valdostan Union	2 March 2023 – 6 November 2025	XVI Legislature
Renzo Testolin	Valdostan Union	6 November 2025 – present	XVII Legislature

Source: Regional Government of Aosta Valley – Governments since 1946
