= 1954 Valdostan regional election =

Italian regional election

The Valdostan regional election of 1954 took place on 6 November 1954.

The Christian Democracy broke up with the Valdostan Union and it won this its centrist allies.

== Results ==
Electoral system: limited voting (jackpot for winners: 25 seats)

Party	votes	votes (%)	seats
Christian Democracy – Italian Liberal Party – Italian Democratic Socialist Party	22,663	40.7	25
Italian Communist Party – Italian Socialist Party	16,794	30.1	9
Valdostan Union	16,278	29.2	1
Total	55,735	100.0	35

Sources: Regional Council of Aosta Valley and Istituto Cattaneo
