= 1968 Valdostan regional election =

Italian regional election

The Valdostan regional election of 1968 took place on 21 April 1968.

The alliance of 1966 was initially confirmed, but political instability arose after a first change in 1969, until the local Christian Democracy broke up in 1970.

== Results ==
Party	votes	votes (%)	seats
Christian Democracy	25,467	37.8	13
Italian Communist Party	13,742	20.4	7
Valdostan Union	11,237	16.7	6
Unified Socialist Party	6,954	10.3	4
Italian Liberal Party	3,765	5.6	2
Valdostan Rally	3,627	5.4	2
Italian Socialist Party of Proletarian Unity	1,560	2.3	1
Italian Social Movement	533	0.8	-
Italian Republican Party	525	0.8	-
Total	67,410	100.0	35

Sources: Regional Council of Aosta Valley and Istituto Cattaneo
