= 1988 Valdostan regional election =

Italian regional election

The Valdostan regional election of 1988 took place on 26 –27 June 1988.

Many “coup de theatre” happened during this term. Two years after the election the Christian Democracy fired the Valdostan Union, but later the UV fired itself the Christian Democrats with the help of the Progressive Democratic Autonomists.

== Results ==
Party	votes	votes (%)	seats
Valdostan Union	26,960	34.2	12
Christian Democracy	15,319	19.4	7
Italian Communist Party	10,953	13.9	5
Progressive Democratic Autonomists	8,667	11.0	4
Italian Socialist Party	6,541	8.3	3
New Left	?	2.5	1
Italian Republican Party	1,732	2.2	1
Italian Social Movement	1,381	1.8	1
Autonomist Union	?	1.6	1
Italian Democratic Socialist Party	1,263	1.6	-
Italian Liberal Party	1,259	1.6	-
Others	4745	6.0	-
Total	81,332	100.0	35

Sources: Regional Council of Aosta Valley and Istituto Cattaneo
