= Autonomy Liberty Participation Ecology =

Italian political party

Autonomy Liberty Participation Ecology Autonomie, Liberté, Participation, Écologie
- President: Roberto Cunéaz
- Founded: 2010
- Dissolved: 2019
- Merger of: RV, VdA, VAVdA
- Merged into: Valdostan Alliance
- Headquarters: via Trottechien, 59; 11100 Aosta
- Ideology: Regionalism; Social democracy Green politics
- Political position: Centre-left
- Regional affiliation: Autonomies for Europe
- European affiliation: European Free Alliance

Website
- http://www.alpevda.eu

Autonomy Liberty Participation Ecology (French: Autonomie, Liberté, Participation, Écologie, ALPE) was a regionalist political party active in Aosta Valley, Italy, whose progressive ideology mixes elements of social democracy and green politics. The party was a member of the European Free Alliance.

== History ==
ALPE was founded in January 2010 by the merger of five groups:

- Valdostan Renewal (RV, social-liberal);
- Vallée d'Aoste Vive (VdA, social-liberal);
- Alternative Greens (VAVdA, green, regional section of the Greens);
- a group of former Democrats of the Left (DS, social-democratic);
- previously un-attached people of the civil society.

Carlo Perrin, a former senator, was elected first co-ordinator, later president, of the party.

In the 2013 Italian general election ALPE was part of the Autonomy Liberty Democracy (ALD) coalition and ALPE's Patrizia Morelli stood for the Senate, but both ALD candidates (the other being Jean-Pierre Guichardaz of the Democratic Party) were defeated. In the 2013 regional election ALPE obtained 12.4% of the vote and 5 seats in the Regional Council.

In March 2017 ALPE, along with the Progressive Valdostan Union (UVP), Edelweiss (SA), and For Our Valley (PNV) formed a new cabinet without the Valdostan Union (UV), under President Pierluigi Marquis (SA). ALPE, which entered the regional government for the first time, was represented by Albert Chatrian as minister of Budget and Finances, Fabrizio Roscio minister of Productive Activities, and Chantal Certan minister of Education and Culture. Marquis' government lasted only until October, when it was replaced by an UVP-led government without ALPE.

In the 2018 general election ALPE unsuccessfully took part within the For All alliance, along with SA and PNV.

In the 2018 regional election ALPE obtained 9.0% and three seats. After the election, the Regional Council elected Nicoletta Spelgatti of Lega Nord Valle d'Aosta (LNVdA) as President, at the head of a broad left-right coalition, comprising SA–PNV, ALPE, Mouv' and one defector from UV's ranks. In the new government Certan was appointed minister of Health and Social Affairs. However, in December the government was replaced by a new one led by Antonio Fosson (PNV), at the head of a coalition composed of the UV, the UVP, ALPE, SA and PNV. Under Fosson, Certan became minister of the Environment, Natural Resources and Forestry Corps. In April 2019 ALPE formed a joint group with the UVP.

== Election results ==
=== Regional elections ===
Election	Votes	%	Seats	+/–
2013	8,943	12.41	5 / 35	New
2018	5,733	9.00	3 / 35	▼2

== Leadership ==
- President: Carlo Perrin (2010–2013), Piero Floris (2013–2016), Alexis Vallet (2016–2018), Roberto Cunéaz (2018–2019)
- Secretary: Chantal Certan (2011–2013)
