= 1959 Valdostan regional election =

Italian regional election

The Valdostan regional election of 1959 took place on 17 May 1959.

The Valdostan Union sought a revenge for the previous election, it allied with the left and won.

== Results ==
Electoral system: limited voting (jackpot for winners: 25 seats)

Party	votes	votes (%)	seats
Valdostan Union – Italian Communist Party – Italian Socialist Party – PSDI dissidents	30,214	51.4	25
Christian Democracy – Italian Liberal Party – Italian Democratic Socialist Party	28,539	48.6	10
Total	58,753	100.0	35

Sources: Regional Council of Aosta Valley and Istituto Cattaneo
