= 1999 European Parliament election in Aosta Valley =

The European Parliament election of 1999 took place on 13 June 1999. The Valdostan Union was by far the most voted party in Aosta Valley.

== Results ==
Party	votes	votes (%)
Valdostan Union–others	27,811	45.9
Forza Italia	10,650	17.6
Bonino List	5,365	8.9
Democrats of the Left	4,516	7.5
Segni Pact – National Alliance	2,271	3.8
The Democrats	1,902	3.1
Communist Refoundation Party	1,670	2.8
Federation of the Greens	1,585	2.6
Lega Nord	1,178	2.0
Italian People's Party	751	1.2
Party of Italian Communists	656	1.1
Others	2,203	3.6
Total	60,558	100.0

Source: Ministry of the Interior
