= 2019 European Parliament election in Aosta Valley =

The European Parliament election of 2019 took place in Italy on 26 May 2019.

In Aosta Valley Lega Nord came first with 37.2% of the vote (country-level result 34.3%) and more than 20pp than the Democratic Party, which came second with 16.2% of the vote. Autonomies for Europe, a five-party regional coalition including the Valdostan Union, came third with 13.9% of the vote, ahead of the Five Star Movement (9.7%), Forza Italia (5.4%), Green Europe (4.7%), More Europe (3.7%), Brothers of Italy (3.3%) and The Left (2.7%).

== Results ==
Party	Votes	%
League	18,525	37.2
Democratic Party	8,084	16.2
Autonomies for Europe	6,904	13.9
Five Star Movement	4,830	9.7
Forza Italia	2,684	5.4
Green Europe	2,322	4.7
More Europe	1,844	3.7
Brothers of Italy	1,618	3.3
The Left	1,331	2.7
Animalist Party	391	0.8
Communist Party	379	0.8
CasaPound–United Right	336	0.7
Pirate Party	219	0.4
Populars for Italy	173	0.4
The People of the Family–Popular Alternative	154	0.3
New Force	50	0.1
Total	49,844	100.00

Source: Ministry of the Interior
