= 2013 Italian general election in Aosta Valley =

Election results

The Italian general election of 2013 took place on 24–25 March 2013.

In its two single-seat constituencies, Aosta Valley elected Rudi Marguerettaz (Edelweiss, Aosta Valley) to the Chamber of Deputies and Albert Lanièce (Valdostan Union, Aosta Valley coalition) to the Senate.

UVP endorsed Morelli. The People of Freedom endorsed the candidates of UV.

== Results ==
=== Chamber of Deputies ===
Candidate	Party/coalition	votes	%
Rudi Marguerettaz	Aosta Valley coalition	18,376	25.4
Laurent Viérin	Progressive Valdostan Union	18,191	25.1
Jean Pierre Guichardaz	Autonomy Liberty Democracy	14,340	19.8
Roberto Cognetta	Five Star Movement	13,403	18.5
Giorgia Meloni	Brothers of Italy	3,051	4.2
Nicoletta Spelegatti	Lega Nord	2,384	3.3
Luca Bringhen	Union of the Centre	1,355	1.9
Fabrizio Buillet	Act to Stop the Decline	748	1.0
Andrea Ladu	CasaPound	443	0.6
Eros Campion	Nation Val d'Outa	145	0.2
	Total	72,436	100.0

Source: Aosta Valley Region

=== Senate ===
Candidate	Party/coalition	votes	%
Albert Lanièce	Aosta Valley coalition	24,609	37.0
Patrizia Morelli	Autonomy Liberty Democracy	20,430	30.8
Stefano Ferrero	Five Star Movement	13,760	20.7
Sandy Cane	Lega Nord	2,608	3.9
Paolo Dalbard	The Right	2.014	3.0
Luigi Bracci	Union of the Centre	1,594	2.4
Enrico Martial	Act to Stop the Decline	814	1.2
Vilma Margaria	CasaPound	424	0.4
Mascia Giovanni Battista	Nation Val d'Outa	186	0.3
	Total	66,439	100.0

Source: Aosta Valley Region
