= 2004 European Parliament election in Aosta Valley =

The European Parliament election of 2004 took place on 12–13 June 2004. The Valdostan Union was the most voted party in Aosta Valley.

== Results ==
| Party | votes | votes (%) |
|---|---|---|
| Valdostan Union–others | 21,157 | 37.6 |
| Forza Italia | 9,569 | 17.0 |
| The Olive Tree: Democracy is Freedom – The Daisy; Democrats of the Left; Italian Democratic Socialists; European Republicans Movement | 7,639 | 13.6 |
| National Alliance | 2,882 | 5.1 |
| Communist Refoundation Party | 2,398 | 4.3 |
| Federation of the Greens | 2,180 | 3.9 |
| Lega Nord | 1,661 | 3.0 |
| Bonino List | 1,425 | 2.5 |
| Union of Christian and Centre Democrats | 1,285 | 2.3 |
| United Socialists for Europe | 885 | 1.6 |
| Party of Italian Communists | 843 | 1.5 |
| Social Alternative (incl. Valdostan Right) | 835 | 1.5 |
| Italy of Values–Civil Society–Occhetto | 800 | 1.4 |
| Pensioners' Party | 629 | 1.1 |
| Consumers' List | 594 | 1.1 |
| Others | 1,554 | 2.8 |
| Total | 56,336 | 100.0 |

Source: Ministry of the Interior
