= For Our Valley =

Italian political party

For Our Valley Pour Notre Vallée
- Founded: November 2016
- Dissolved: 2020 ca.
- Youth wing: Pour Nos Jeunes
- Ideology: Regionalism
- Political position: Centre
- National affiliation: Forza Italia

Website
- Archived Website

For Our Valley (French: Pour Notre Vallée, PNV) was a centrist political party active from 2016 to 2020 in Aosta Valley, Italy.

In November 2016, two regional councillors, former senator Antonio Fosson and Claudio Restano, left the Valdostan Union (UV) in disagreement with Augusto Rollandin, President of Aosta Valley, and launched the party. PNV was immediately admitted into the coalition supporting the regional government composed also of the Progressive Valdostan Union (UVP), Edelweiss (SA) and the Democratic Party (PD).

In March 2017, PNV stopped supporting the government and, along with the UVP, SA and Autonomy Liberty Participation Ecology (ALPE), formed a new government without the UV, under President Pierluigi Marquis (SA), with Restano minister of Tourism, Sports, Commerce and Transports. In June 2017, the group of the PNV was enlarged to Carlo Norbiato, another dissident from the UV, and consequently changed name to Civic Area – For Our Valley. In September, a joint group with SA was formed: Civic Area – Edelweiss – For Our Valley. In October Marquis resigned and was replaced by Laurent Viérin (UVP) at the head of a coalition composed of the UV, the UVP, the EPAV and the PD.

In the 2018 general election, PNV took part within the For All alliance, along with ALPE and SA, but the list was defeated in both races, coming third for the Chamber of Deputies and fourth for the Senate. In the 2018 regional election, PNV formed a joint list with SA, which obtained 10.7% and four seats (two for PNV and two for SA). After the election, the Regional Council elected Nicoletta Spelgatti of Lega Nord Valle d'Aosta (LNVdA) as president, at the head of a broad left-right coalition, comprising SA–PNV, ALPE, Mouv' and one defector from UV's ranks. In the new government Restano kept his office, along with SA's Stefano Borrello. However, in December, the government fell down and was replaced by a new one led by Fosson, at the head of a coalition composed also of the UV, the UVP, ALPE and SA. In June 2019, Fosson formed a group along with UV dissident Emily Rini, while Restano remained in the Mixed Group. In December 2019, Fosson resigned from President, as well as the Regional Council. Soon after, Rini joined Forza Italia and became the party's regional coordinator.

In the 2020 regional election, PNV ran in a joint list composed of Forza Italia and the Brothers of Italy but failed to elect representatives, while Restano was elected councillor from a joint list named "United Aosta Valley" with Mouv', which obtained 8.1% of the vote and a total of three seats. In 2024 Mouv' was merged into UV, while Restano joined the Valdostan Rally. By that time, PNV was no longer active.

== Electoral results ==
=== Regional elections ===
Election	Votes	%	Seats	+/–
2018 (Note: In a joint list with Edelweiss.)	6,792	10.66	2 / 35	New
2020 (Note: In a joint list with Forza Italia and Brothers of Italy.)	3,761	5.68	0 / 35	▼2

== Leadership ==
- Coordinator: Leonardo La Torre (2017–2018), Fabio Gradi (2018–2019)
