= Valdostan Rally (1963) =

Defunct political party in Aosta Valley, Italy

The Valdostan Rally (Rassemblement Valdôtain, RV) was a conservative and Christian-democratic political party in Aosta Valley, Italy. In 1963, a group of conservative members of the Valdostan Union (UV) formed the Valdostan Independent Rally (RIV) and won 3.3% of the vote in the 1963 Valdostan regional election. In 1967, the RIV merged with other conservative groups in order to form the RV. Under the new name, the party won 5.4% of the vote in the 1968 Valdostan regional election. In the 1973 Valdostan regional election, it achieved 1.6% of the votes. During all its lifetime, the party was a minor ally of Christian Democracy (DC) regionally. In January 1977, the RV re-joined the UV.

== See also ==
- List of political parties in Aosta Valley
