= 2008 Valdostan regional election =

Italian regional election

- 25 May 2008
- All 35 seats to the Regional Council of Aosta Valley; 18 seats needed for a majority
- Turnout: 73.03%
Party	Vote %	Seats	+/–
UV	44.4%	17	−1
VdA Vive – RV	12.5%	5	New
SA	11.4%	4	−3
PdL	10.7%	4	+1
PD	9.3%	3	−1
FA	6.2%	2	New
This lists parties that won seats. See the complete results below.
President before	President after
Augusto Rollandin; UV	Augusto Rollandin; UV

The Valdostan regional election of 2008 took place in Italy's Aosta Valley on 25 May 2008. The election saw the victory of the centrist autonomist coalition led by Aosta Valley's former governor, Augusto Rollandin.

== Results ==
2008 Aosta Valley regional election results
Coalition	Parties	Votes	%	Seats
Aosta Valley	Valdostan Union	32,614	44.39	17
Aosta Valley	Edelweiss (incl. UdC)	8,370	11.39	4
Aosta Valley	Autonomist Federation	4,536	6.17	2
Aosta Valley	Total	44,520	61.95	23
Autonomy Liberty Democracy	Vallée d'Aoste Vive – Valdostan Renewal	9,170	12.48	5
Autonomy Liberty Democracy	Democratic Party	6,841	9.31	3
Autonomy Liberty Democracy	Rainbow Aosta Valley (incl. Greens)	4,120	5.61	–
Autonomy Liberty Democracy	Total	20,131	27.40	8
The People of Freedom		7,826	10.65	4
Total		72,477	100.0	35
Source: Aosta Valley Region – Results

Popular vote (parties)
UV	44.4%
RV–VdAV	12.5%
SA	11.4%
PdL	10.7%
PD–VdA Left	9.3%
FA	6.2%
AVdA	5.6%

Popular vote (coalitions)
VdA	62.0%
ALD	27.4%
CDX	10.7%
