= Alé Vallée =

Alé Vallée (translatable as Forward Valley) was a social-democratic political party active in Aosta Valley.

The party, whose leader was Enrico Bich, was the heir of the Italian Socialist Party in the Region and gained 4.7% of the votes (in list with the Italian Democratic Socialists and UDEUR) in the 2003 regional election, failing to surpass the 5% threshold needed to enter in the Regional Council of the Valley. Since then the party gained representation in the Municipal Council of Aosta and finally decided to merge in the regional Democratic Party.

In October 2007 Enrico Bich was a candidate for the post of regional secretary of the Democratic Party, but was defeated (62.5% against 37.5%) by Raimondo Donzel, a trade unionist supported by the Democrats of the Left.
