= 1996 Italian general election in Aosta Valley =

The Italian general election of 1996 took place on 21 April 1996.

== Results ==
=== Chamber of Deputies ===
| Candidate | Party/coalition | votes | % |
|---|---|---|---|
| Luciano Caveri | Valdostan Union–allies | 37,431 | 48.6 |
| Enrico Tibaldi | Pole for Freedoms | 15,810 | 25.0 |
| Secondina Squarzino | The Olive Tree | 11,526 | 15.0 |
| Paolo Linty | Lega Nord | 6,223 | 8.1 |
| Silvino Morosso | Communist Refoundation Party | 5,593 | 7.3 |
| Maria Durando | Renewal | 444 | 0.6 |
| | Total | 77,027 | 100.0 |

Source: Ministry of the Interior

=== Senate ===
| Candidate | Party/coalition | votes | % |
|---|---|---|---|
| Guido Dondeynaz | Valdostan Union–allies | 29,538 | 44.2 |
| Giorgio Bongiorno | Pole for Freedoms | 14,810 | 22.2 |
| Ambra Arangio | The Olive Tree | 10,371 | 15.5 |
| Giuseppe Henriet | Lega Nord | 6,468 | 9.7 |
| Pier Giuseppe Paolini | Communist Refoundation Party | 5,681 | 8.5 |
| | Total | 66,868 | 100.0 |

Source: Ministry of the Interior
