= For Aosta Valley =

Italian political party

For Aosta Valley (French: Pour la Vallée d'Aoste, PVdA) was a social-liberal and Christian-leftist Italian political party active in Aosta Valley.

It was founded in 1993 by Cesare Dujany, former leader of the Popular Democrats, and Ilario Lanivi, leader of the Independent Autonomists. In the 1993 regional election the party won 4.3% of the vote and got elected two regional deputies. In 1998 PVdA merged with the regional section of the Italian People's Party to form the Autonomists.

In the 1994 general election Dujany was re-elected to the Italian Senate.
