= Valdostan Renewal =

Valdostan Renewal Renouveau Valdôtain
- Leader: Carlo Perrin
- Founded: 2006
- Dissolved: 12 February 2010
- Split from: Valdostan Union
- Merged into: Autonomy Liberty Participation Ecology
- Headquarters: corso Padre Lorenzo, 51; 51, avenue Père Laurent; 11100 Aosta/Aoste
- Newspaper: Renouveau Valdôtain
- Ideology: Regionalism; Social liberalism
- European affiliation: European Free Alliance

Website
- http://www.renouveauvaldotain.eu/

Valdostan Renewal (French: Renouveau Valdôtain, RV) was a social-liberal Italian political party active in the Aosta Valley.

It was founded in 2006 by a split from the Valdostan Union (UV), led by former President of Region Carlo Perrin. These dissidents wanted closer ties with the Italian centre-left parties of The Union.

In the 2006 general election, RV was affiliated to the Autonomy Liberty Democracy (ALD) coalition, composed of the Democrats of the Left, The Daisy, Alé Vallée, Vallée d'Aoste Vive, the Communist Refoundation Party, the Federation of the Greens and other minor parties. ALD elected Roberto Rolando Nicco of the Democrats of the Left to the Chamber of Deputies and Carlo Perrin to the Senate.

In the 2008 regional election RV formed a joint list with Vallée d'Aoste Vive (VdAV): the list won 12.5% of the vote and 5 regional deputies (out of 35), of which 3 of RV. ALD was however severely defeated by the Aosta Valley coalition.

In February 2010, RV agreed to merge into a new party named Autonomy Liberty Participation Ecology (ALPE), along with VdAV, the Alternative Greens and other centre-left groups.

== Leadership ==
- Coordinator: Lorella Vezza (2006–2007), Albert Chatrian (2007–2008), Franco Vallet (2008–2010)
