= Laurent Viérin =

Italian politician (born 1975)

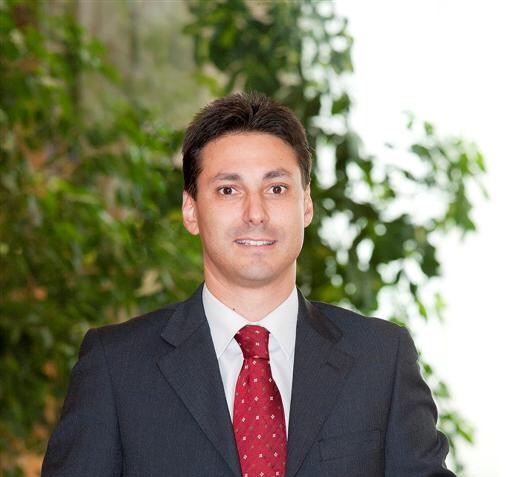

Laurent Viérin (born 7 August 1975) is an Italian politician who served as president of Aosta Valley from 13 October 2017 to 27 June 2018. He is the co-founder of the Progressive Valdostan Union party.

== Early life ==
Viérin was born in Aosta on 7 August 1975 and resides in Jovençan. He is the son of Dino Viérin, former Aosta Valley president.

== Politics ==
He was elected to the Jovençan municipal council in 1995 and to the Regional Council of Aosta Valley in 2003, as a member of the Valdostan Union party. He was reelected in the 2008, 2013, and 2018 elections, serving as several different regional ministers. In 2013 he left the Valdostan Union to co-found (with Luciano Caveri and Andrea Rosset) the Progressive Valdostan Union party. He ran for election to the Chamber of Deputies in 2013 but lost by less than 200 votes to Rudi Marguerettaz. In October 2017, he was elected president of Aosta Valley after the resignation of Pierluigi Marquis. On 14 December 2019, he resigned from the Regional Council during an investigation of possible ties to the 'Ndrangheta.

== Honors ==
- Chevalier of the Ordre des Arts et des Lettres (2012)
