= Progressive Democratic Autonomists =

Italian political party

The Progressive Democratic Autonomists (French: Autonomistes démocrates progressistes, ADP) was a social-liberal and Christian-leftist Italian political party active in Aosta Valley. Its leading members included Cesare Dujany, Maurizio Martin, Angelo Pollicini, Ilario Lanivi, Giuseppe Maquignaz and Claudio Lavoyer.

It was founded in 1984 by the merger of the Popular Democrats and the Progressive Valdostan Union. Its best electoral result was in 1988, when it won 11.0% of the votes and got elected four regional deputies. After the split of the Independent Autonomists led by Lanivi in 1991, the party run the 1993 regional election in coalition with the local Italian Republican Party, winning 6.5% and two regional deputies. In 1998 the group, led by Lavoyer, merged with the Autonomist People's Alliance to form the Autonomist Federation. From 1983 to 1994 ADP was represented at the Italian Senate by Cesare Dujany, who was re-elected until 1996 by For Aosta Valley.
