= Nicoletta Spelgatti =

Italian politician (born 1971)

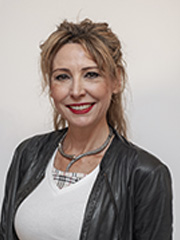
- Spelgatti in 2022

Member of the Senate
- Incumbent
- Assumed office 13 October 2022
- Preceded by: Albert Lanièce
- Constituency: Aosta Valley

President of Aosta Valley
- In office 26 June 2018 – 10 December 2018
- Preceded by: Laurent Viérin
- Succeeded by: Antonio Fosson

Member of the Regional Council of Aosta Valley
- In office 26 June 2018 – 19 October 2022

Personal details
- Born: 28 July 1971 (age 54)
- Party: Lega

Nicoletta Spelgatti (born 28 July 1971) is an Italian politician serving as a member of the Senate since 2022. From June to December 2018, she served as president of Aosta Valley.
