= Popular Democrats =

Political party in Italy

The Popular Democrats (Democratici Popolari, DP) was a Christian-leftist Italian political party active in the Aosta Valley of Italy. Its leading members included Cesare Dujany, Maurizio Martin and Angelo Pollicini.

The party emerged by a left-wing split (seven regional deputies out of 13) of regional Christian Democracy. Subsequently Popular Democrat leader Cesare Dujany became President of the Region at the head of a coalition composed of the Italian Socialist Party, the Valdostan Rally and the Italian Democratic Socialist Party. In the 1973 regional election DP won 22.4% of the vote and got elected eight regional deputies.

After the election, Dujany was again President of the Region, this time with the support of the Socialists and the Progressive Valdostan Union (UVP), but in 1974 he resigned and the Valdostan Union returned in government.

In the 1979 general election, due to an electoral pact with UV, Dujany was elected to the Italian Parliament, where he served until 1996.

After a decline in term of votes (11.8% in 1978), DP joined forces with UVP in the 1983 regional election, winning 10.4%. In 1984 the two parties merged to form the Progressive Democratic Autonomists.
