= Cesare Dujany =

Italian politician (1920–2019)

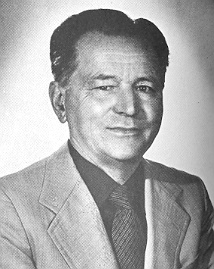
Cesare Dujany

Cesare Dujany or César Dujany (20 February 1920 in Saint-Vincent (Aosta Valley) – 31 March 2019 in Châtillon) was an Italian politician.

He served as President of Aosta Valley from 1970 to 1974 and as MP from 1979 to 1987.
