= Pierluigi Marquis =

Italian politician

President of Aosta Valley
- In office 10 March 2017 – 11 October 2017
- Preceded by: Augusto Rollandin
- Succeeded by: Laurent Viérin

Personal details
- Born: 30 May 1964 (age 62) Aosta, Aosta Valley, Italy
- Party: Edelweiss

Pierluigi Marquis (born 30 May 1964) is an Italian architect and politician who served as the President of Aosta Valley from 10 March until 11 October 2017.
