= Antonio Fosson =

Italian politician (born 1951)

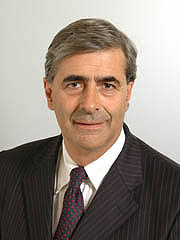

Member of the Senate
- In office 29 April 2008 – 14 March 2013

President of Aosta Valley
- In office 10 December 2018 – 16 December 2019
- Preceded by: Nicoletta Spelgatti
- Succeeded by: Erik Lavévaz

President of the Regional Council of Aosta Valley
- In office 26 June 2018 – 10 December 2018
- Preceded by: Joël Farcoz
- Succeeded by: Emily Rini

Regional assessor of Healthcare and Social welfare of Aosta Valley
- In office 8 June 2003 – 24 April 2008
- In office 8 July 2013 – 7 June 2016

Member of the Regional Council of Aosta Valley
- In office 18 June 2003 – 24 April 2008
- In office 1 July 2013 – 16 December 2019

Personal details
- Born: 11 October 1951 (age 75) Ivrea, Italy
- Party: Pour Notre Vallée (PNV)
- Occupation: Politician

Antonio Fosson (born 11 October 1951) is an Italian politician. Antonio was elected president of Aosta Valley from 10 December 2018 to 16 December 2019. Antonio is a member of the Pour Notre Vallée Party.

== Life ==
Antonio was born in Ivrea, Italy, on October 11th, 1951. He started his political term on or about June 8th, 2003, and ended his political career in December 16th, 2019.

== Career ==
He was elected senator in 2008 from Ayes. He is a member of the 12th Standing Committee on Hygiene and Health, as well as of the Parliamentary Committee on Regional Questions.

At the 2018 regional elections in Valle d'Aosta he was re-elected from the common list with Stella Alpina. On 26 June 2018 he was elected President of the Valle d'Aosta Regional Council at the beginning of the XV Aosta Valley legislature with 18 preferences. In October he left the group "AC-Stella Alpina-Pour Notre Vallée" to join the mixed group together with his party colleague Claudio Restano. In 2013 he returned to the Conseil de la Vallée and as an assessor for health and social policy, which he resigned in June 2016. A few months later he left his parent party and founded the group Pour Notre Vallée. In 2018 he was re-elected from the joint list of Area civica – Stella Alpina – Pour notre vallée, then from June to December 2018 he was the chairman of parliament he also joined the new federation club. On 10 December 2018, after changing the government coalition and excluding the League, he was appointed president of the Aosta Valley.
