= Progressive Valdostan Union (1973) =

Political party in the Aosta Valley, Italy

Progressive Valdostan Union Union Valdôtaine Progressiste
- Founded: 1972
- Dissolved: 1984
- Split from: Valdostan Union
- Merged into: Progressive Democratic Autonomists
- Ideology: Aostan regionalism Social democracy Federalism
- Political position: Centre-left

The Progressive Valdostan Union (French: Union Valdôtaine Progressiste, UVP) was a social-democratic Italian political party active in Aosta Valley.

== History ==
It emerged in 1972 as a split from the Valdostan Union and won 6.7% of the vote in the following year regional election. After a decline in term of votes (3.1% in 1978), UVP joined forces with the Popular Democrats in the 1983 regional election, winning 10.4%. In 1984 the two parties merged to form the Progressive Democratic Autonomists.

The leaders of the party included Bruno Salvadori, whose federalist ideas strongly influenced Umberto Bossi, founder and leader of Lega Nord.
