= Valdostan Union =

Centrist political party in Italy

Valdostan Union Union Valdôtaine
- President: Joël Farcoz
- Founded: 13 September 1945; 80 years ago
- Headquarters: 29, Avenue des Maquisards; 11100 Aosta
- Newspaper: Le Peuple Valdôtain
- Youth wing: Jeunesse Valdôtaine
- Ideology: Regionalism; French-speaking minority interests
- Political position: Centre
- National affiliation: The Olive Tree (1995–2006); Centre-right coalition (2008–2014); Centre-left coalition (2014–2025)
- Regional affiliation: Aosta Valley (1983–present); Autonomies for Europe (2019)
- European affiliation: European Free Alliance
- European Parliament group: ELDR Group (2000–2003)
- Chamber of Deputies: 1 / 400
- Senate: 0 / 205
- European Parliament: 0 / 76
- Regional Council of Aosta Valley: 12 / 35
- Conference of Regions: 1 / 21

Website
- unionvaldotaine.org

The Valdostan Union (French: Union valdôtaine, UV), also Valdostian Union or Valdotanian Union, is a regionalist and centrist political party in Aosta Valley, Italy. It represents mainly the French-speaking minority in the region. One of its leading members, Renzo Testolin, has been the President of Aosta Valley since March 2023, replacing Erik Lavévaz, also of the UV.

The UV has been steadily represented in the Italian Parliament since 1976 and, due to the disappearance of the Christian Democracy party in the early 1990s, it later became the catch-all party of the region, similarly to the South Tyrolean People's Party in South Tyrol. The party re-groups most Valdostan autonomists under its banner and steadily increased its share of vote from 11.6% in 1973 to 47.2% in 2003, which was followed by a decline and splits. However, it has led the regional government almost with no interruption since 1974.

At the European level, the UV was welcomed as a full member of the European Free Alliance in 2022, after having previously been a member until 2007, and its member within the European Committee of the Regions has been affiliated with Renew Europe since 2026.

== History ==
=== Early years ===
The UV was founded by Valdostan elements of the Italian resistance movement on 3 September 1945.

The party was originally a close ally of the Christian Democracy (DC), with which it shared government between 1946 and 1954 under Severino Caveri (UV). After that, the party distanced itself from the DC, while approaching the left-wing.

After a five-year spell in opposition, the UV won the 1959 regional election as part of a left-wing coalition with the Italian Communist Party (PCI) and the Italian Socialist Party (PSI) with 51.6% against the 48.6% received by an alternative coalition comprising the DC, the Italian Liberal Party (PLI), the Italian Democratic Socialist Party (PSDI) and the Italian Republican Party (PRI).

The UV–PCI–PSI coalition, led by UV's Oreste Marcoz (1959–1963) and then, again, Caveri (since 1963), governed until 1966, when the Socialists decided to switch sides and to enter in coalition with the DC, as they had done at the country-level three years before. This caused the split of UV's conservative faction, which established the Valdostan Rally (RV), in order to support the coalition led by DC's Cesare Bondaz. In the 1968 regional election the UV received a mere 16.7% of the vote (the RV got 5.4%), while in 1973 Valdostan regional election, after the split of the social-democratic faction, the Progressive Valdostan Union (UVP), it was reduced at 11.6% (the UPV obtained 6.7% and the RV 1.6%, while the Popular Democrats, a left-wing split of the DC, won 22.4%). After that low point, the UV was ready to surge again.

=== Resurgence ===
The UV returned to government in 1974 at the head of a UV–UVP–RV regionalist coalition led by Mario Andrione. In the 1978 regional election the UV returned to be the largest party with 24.7% of the vote and Andrione formed a government with the DC and the DP. In 1984 Andrione was replaced by Augusto Rollandin at the head of the government, which included the DC and the Progressive Democratic Autonomists (ADP), born by the merger of the DP and the UVP. During the 1980s the UV strengthened its role as largest party in the region: 27.1% in 1983 and 34.2% in 1988. Since the 1970s the UV was steadily represented in the Italian Parliament: Pierre Fosson was a member of the Senate from 1976 to 1987, while Luciano Caveri (scion of the party's left-wing) represented the UV in the Chamber of Deputies from 1987 to 2001. Caveri served also as undersecretary in Massimo D'Alema's government and as member of the European Parliament from 2000 to 2003.

After having out of government for three years, the UV was back in government in 1992 and, after the 1993 regional election, UV's Dino Viérin formed a centre-left government with the Democratic Party of the Left (PDS), the Greens and the ADP (since 1994). The coalition was continued in 1998–2006 by the UV and the Democrats of the Left (DS), while Rollandin served as senator in 2001–2006. Despite its ties with the parties of the centre-left, the UV contested the 2006 general election in competition with The Union (rallied in the Autonomy Liberty Democracy list), as part of the regionalist coalition named Aosta Valley, causing the split of the Valdostan Renewal (RV), but lost and was no more represented in Parliament. This was however a turning point in regional politics: the UV dismissed the DS as coalition partners and formed a regionalist three-party coalition with Edelweiss (SA) and the Autonomist Federation (FA).

=== Regionalist coalition ===
In the 2008 regional election, the UV obtained 44.4% of the vote and 17 regional councillors (out of 35), while the regionalist coalition won 62.0% and a large majority, comprising 22 regional councillors. Augusto Rollandin, who had made a comeback to regional politics, was the most voted regional councillor with 13,836 preference votes, while incumbent President Luciano Caveri was only seventh with 2,770 votes (down from 7,313). Rollandin was thus sworn in as new President of the Region. Contextually, UV's Antonio Fosson had been elected to the Senate for the regionalist coalition: Fosson joined the For the Autonomies group and abstained from the vote of confidence on Silvio Berlusconi's government. Both in the 2009 European Parliament election and the 2010 Aosta municipal election the UV formed an alliance with Berlusconi's new political party, The People of Freedom (PdL). In the 2013 general election UV's Albert Lanièce was elected to the Senate with support from the PdL. That alliance was however short-lived and the UV would soon re-join its traditional centre-left partners.

In the 2013 regional election, the UV, which had suffered the split of the new Progressive Valdostan Union (UVP), obtained 33.5% of the vote (–10.9pp from 2008) and 13 seats, and the regionalist coalition retained a narrow majority in the Regional Council. Rollandin was the most voted politician with 10,872 preference votes (2,964 less than five years before) and was re-elected president. In July 2015, the government was enlarged to the centre-left Democratic Party (PD). In June 2016, after months of negotiations, the government was joined also by the UVP. In November 2016, two regional councillors, including former senator Fosson, left the party in disagreement with Rollandin and launched For Our Valley (PNV). In March 2017 the UVP, SA (which had suffered the split of the Valdostan Autonomist Popular Edelweiss (EPAV), PNV and Autonomy Liberty Participation Ecology (ALPE) formed a new government without the UV, under President Pierluigi Marquis (SA). In October Marquis resigned and was replaced by Laurent Viérin (UVP) at the head of a coalition composed of the UV, the UVP, the EPAV and the PD.

=== Centre-left coalition ===
In the 2018 general election, Lanièce was narrowly re-elected to the Senate, but the four-party coalition forming the regional government lost several votes and the seat in the Chamber. In the 2018 regional election the UV did even worse, obtaining 19.2% of the vote (–14.3pp from 2013) and seven seats: its worst result in 45 years. After the election, the Regional Council elected Nicoletta Spelgatti of Lega Nord Vallée d'Aoste (LNVdA) as President, at the head of a broad left-right coalition (including one defector from UV's ranks, outgoing regional minister Emily Rini), and the UV was once again excluded from the regional government. However, in December the government fell down and was replaced by a new one led by Antonio Fosson (ex UV, then PNV), at the head of a coalition composed of the UV, the UVP, ALPE, SA and PNV. In December 2019 Fosson resigned from President and was replaced by his Vice President, UV's Renzo Testolin, as acting president. In the 2019 European Parliament election the UV was part of a five-party regionalist joint list, which had a technical agreement with the PD and obtained a mere 13.9% of the vote. A few months later, the party also suffered the split by former President Rollandin and his followers, who formed For Autonomy (PlA).

In the 2020 regional election, the UV was reduced to 15.8%, its second worst result ever, while the LNVdA came a stronger first. However, after the election, UV leader Erik Lavévaz formed a government composed of the PD, Civic Network (RC), the Valdostan Alliance (AV, formed by the merger of ALPE and UVP), SA and Mouv'. Within a year, AV and Mouv' joined forces, while the RC-led Progressive Civic Project (PCP) left the government. In 2023 Testolin formed a new government, which, differently from Lavévaz's, comprised also PlA.

=== Réunion and centre-right coalition ===
In late 2023, AV and Mouv' started a merging process into the UV. In June 2024, at an extraordinary congress, the reunion was approved and Joël Farcoz was elected president. In the 2025 regional election the UV, which also formed a pact with Sovereign Aosta Country, won 32.0% of the vote. After the election, Testolin formed a new government, composed of the UV, the Autonomists of the Centre (AdC) – including SA, the Valdostan Rally (RV) and Action, but not PlA – and Forza Italia (FI).

== Electoral results ==
=== Regional Council ===
Regional Council of Aosta Valley
Election year	Votes	Share of votes	Seats	+/–	Government
1949	17,118	43.6	28 / 35	–	Government coalition
1954	16,278	29.2	1 / 35	▼27	Opposition
1959	16,278	51.4	25 / 35	▲24	Government coalition
1963	12,930	20.4	7 / 35	▼18	Government coalition
1968	11,237	16.7	6 / 35	▼1	Opposition
1973	8,081	11.6	4 / 35	▼2	Opposition
1978	18,318	24.8	9 / 35	▲5	Government coalition
1983	20,495	27.1	9 / 35	Steady	Government coalition
1988	26,960	34.2	12 / 35	▲3	Government coalition
1993	30,312	37.3	13 / 35	▲1	Government coalition
1998	33,311	42.6	17 / 35	▲4	Government coalition
2003	35,297	47.2	18 / 35	▲1	Majority
2008	32,614	44.4	17 / 35	▼1	Government coalition
2013	24,121	33.5	13 / 35	▼4	Government coalition (2013–2017)
2013	24,121	33.5	13 / 35	▼4	Opposition (2017–2017)
2013	24,121	33.5	13 / 35	▼4	Government coalition (2017–2018)
2018	12,265	19.2	7 / 35	▼6	Opposition (2018-2018)
2018	12,265	19.2	7 / 35	▼6	Government coalition (2018–2020)
2020	10,470	15.8	7 / 35	Steady	Government coalition
2025	19,304	32.0	12 / 35	▲5	Government coalition

=== European Parliament ===
European Parliament									
Election	Total					Aosta Valley			
Election	Votes	%	#	Seats	+/–	Votes	%	#	Ref.
1979	Within Union Valdôtaine - Federalismo Europa Autonomie			0 / 81	—	26,137	37,59%	1st	
1984	Within Federalismo - Europa dei Popoli			1 / 81	1	16,175	24,81%	2nd	
1989	Within Federalismo			1 / 81	0		36,4%	1st	
1994	Within Federalismo - Europe			0 / 87	1	19,658	32,3%	1st	
1999	Within Federalismo in Europa / Fédéralisme en Europe			0 / 87	0	40,970	45,9%	1st	
2004	Within Federalismo in Europa / Fédéralisme en Europe			0 / 78	0	29,598	37.6%	1st	
2009	Within Aosta Valley			0 / 72	0	32,913	37.1%	1st	
2014	Did not compete			0 / 73	0	—	—	—	
2019	Within Autonomies for Europe			0 / 76	0	6,904	13.9%	3rd	
2024	Did not compete			0 / 76	0	—	—	—	

== Leadership ==
- President: Severino Caveri (1945–1974), Mario Andrione (1974–1975), Jean-Claude Perrin (1975–1984), Alexis Bétemps (1984–1996), Carlo Perrin (1996–1998), Augusto Rollandin (1998–2001), Aurelio Marguerettaz (2001–2003), Manuela Zublena (2003–2006), Guido Césal (2006–2008), Ego Perron (2008–2013), Ennio Pastoret (2013–2018), Erik Lavévaz (2018–2021), Cristina Machet (2021–2024), Joël Farcoz (2024–present)

== Sources ==
- Regional Council of Aosta Valley – History of Aosta Valley
- Regional Government of Aosta Valley – Governments since 1946
- Regional Government of Aosta Valley – Elections
- Cattaneo Institute – Archive of Election Data
- Ministry of the Interior – Historical Archive of Elections
