= Augusto Rollandin =

Italian politician and veterinarian (1949–2024)

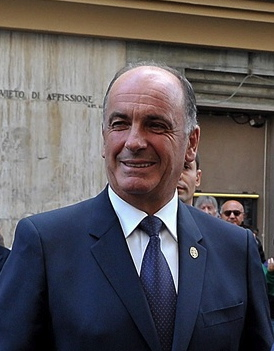

President of Aosta Valley
- In office 4 January 1984 – 25 June 1990
- Preceded by: Mario Andrione
- Succeeded by: Giovanni Bondaz
- In office 1 July 2008 – 10 March 2017
- Preceded by: Luciano Caveri
- Succeeded by: Pierluigi Marquis

Member of the Senate
- In office 30 May 2001 – 27 April 2006
- Constituency: Aosta Valley

Mayor of Brusson
- In office 16 June 1975 – 25 June 1978
- Preceded by: Giampietro Turcotti
- Succeeded by: Ignazio Lévêque

Personal details
- Born: Augusto Arduino Claudio Rollandin; 13 June 1949 Brusson, Italy
- Died: 22 December 2024 (aged 75) Aosta, Italy
- Party: Valdostan Union (1975–2020); For Autonomy (2020–2024)
- Education: University of Turin
- Profession: Veterinarian

Augusto Arduino Claudio Rollandin (IPA [awɡusto ardwino klawdjo ʁɔlɑ̃dɛ̃]; 13 June 1949 – 22 December 2024) was an Italian politician and veterinarian. Born in Brusson, Aosta Valley, Italy, he was a member of the Valdostan Union, a center-right, pro-autonomy Italian political party active in the Aosta Valley.

== Life and career ==
From 4 January 1984 to 25 June 1990, and again from 1 July 2008 to 10 March 2017, Rollandin served as the President of Aosta Valley.

In July 2013, Rollandin was re-elected to the presidency by a coalition of center-right, pro-autonomy parties consisting of the Valdostan Union (UV) and the Edelweiss (SA). The coalition government, led by the Valdostan Union, lost 14 percentage points in the May 2013 Aosta Valley regional election, a decline from the 2008 election results, but still retained an absolute majority in the Council of the Valley. Rollandin's coalition was supported by 18 of the 35 Council members.

In his July 2013 speech to the Council upon his re-election, Rollandin promised that his government would pay "the utmost attention" to the French language, which shares official status in the Aosta Valley with Italian. He also reiterated the "relevance" in "cultural policies" of the Aosta Valley's two regional languages, Franco-Provençal (also called Valdôtain locally) and Walser German.

Rollandin died on 22 December 2024, at the age of 75.
