= Elections in Sardinia =

This page gathers the results of elections in Sardinia.

== Regional elections ==
=== Latest regional election ===
The latest regional election took place on 25 February 2024. Alessandra Todde of the Five Star Movement, at the head of a centre-left coalition centred on the Democratic Party, narrowly defeated Paolo Truzzu of Brothers of Italy, who replaced incumbent president Christian Solinas of the Sardinian Action Party as standard-bearer of the centre-right coalition. In a fragmented party system, with the presence of several regional and/or Sardinian nationalist parties, the Democratic Party was narrowly ahead of Brothers of Italy as largest party.

25 February 2024 Sardinia regional election results
Candidates	Votes	%	Seats	Parties	Votes	%	Seats
Alessandra Todde	334,160	45.4	1	Democratic Party	95,285	13.8	11
Alessandra Todde	334,160	45.4	1	Five Star Movement	53,613	7.8	7
Alessandra Todde	334,160	45.4	1	Greens and Left Alliance	32,145	4.7	4
Alessandra Todde	334,160	45.4	1	United for Alessandra Todde	27,422	4.0	3
Alessandra Todde	334,160	45.4	1	Shared Horizon	20,984	3.0	3
Alessandra Todde	334,160	45.4	1	Progressive Party	20,868	3.0	3
Alessandra Todde	334,160	45.4	1	Future Left	20,574	3.0	3
Alessandra Todde	334,160	45.4	1	Italian Socialist Party – SIE	11,637	1.7	1
Alessandra Todde	334,160	45.4	1	Fortza Paris	6,068	0.9	–
Alessandra Todde	334,160	45.4	1	Solidary Democracy	4,692	0.7	–
Alessandra Todde	334,160	45.4	1	Total	293,288	42.5	36
Paolo Truzzu	331,099	45.0	1	Brothers of Italy	93,921	13.6	7
Paolo Truzzu	331,099	45.0	1	Sardinian Reformers	49,629	7.2	3
Paolo Truzzu	331,099	45.0	1	Forza Italia	43,892	6.4	3
Paolo Truzzu	331,099	45.0	1	Sardinia in the Centre 2020	37,950	5.5	3
Paolo Truzzu	331,099	45.0	1	Sardinian Action Party	37,341	5.4	3
Paolo Truzzu	331,099	45.0	1	Sardinia Alliance – PLI	28,203	4.1	2
Paolo Truzzu	331,099	45.0	1	League Sardinia	25,957	3.8	1
Paolo Truzzu	331,099	45.0	1	Union of the Centre	19,237	2.8	1
Paolo Truzzu	331,099	45.0	1	Christian Democracy with Rotondi	2,110	0.3	–
Paolo Truzzu	331,099	45.0	1	Total	333,873	48.4	23
Renato Soru	63,666	8.7	–	Sardinia Project	23,872	3.5	–
Renato Soru	63,666	8.7	–	Vote Sardinia	10,830	1.6	–
Renato Soru	63,666	8.7	–	Action – More Europe – LDE – UPC	10,577	1.5	–
Renato Soru	63,666	8.7	–	Liberu	4,993	0.7	–
Renato Soru	63,666	8.7	–	Communist Refoundation Party	4,534	0.7	–
Renato Soru	63,666	8.7	–	Total	54,569	7.9	–
Lucia Chessa	7,261	1.0	–	Sardigna R-Esiste (incl. Red Moors)	4,067	0.6	–
Invalid votes	21,412	–					
Total candidates	736,186	100.00	2	Total parties	690.401	100.00	58
Registered voters	1,447,753						
Source: Autonomous Region of Sardinia – Results

=== List of previous regional elections ===
- 1949 Sardinian regional election
- 1953 Sardinian regional election
- 1957 Sardinian regional election
- 1961 Sardinian regional election
- 1965 Sardinian regional election
- 1969 Sardinian regional election
- 1974 Sardinian regional election
- 1979 Sardinian regional election
- 1984 Sardinian regional election
- 1989 Sardinian regional election
- 1994 Sardinian regional election
- 1999 Sardinian regional election
- 2004 Sardinian regional election
- 2009 Sardinian regional election
- 2014 Sardinian regional election
- 2019 Sardinian regional election

== Italian general elections ==
- 1946 Italian general election in Sardinia
- 1948 Italian general election in Sardinia
- 1953 Italian general election in Sardinia
- 1958 Italian general election in Sardinia
- 1963 Italian general election in Sardinia
- 1968 Italian general election in Sardinia
- 1972 Italian general election in Sardinia
- 1976 Italian general election in Sardinia
- 1979 Italian general election in Sardinia
- 1983 Italian general election in Sardinia
- 1987 Italian general election in Sardinia
- 1992 Italian general election in Sardinia
- 1994 Italian general election in Sardinia
- 1996 Italian general election in Sardinia
- 2001 Italian general election in Sardinia
- 2006 Italian general election in Sardinia
- 2008 Italian general election in Sardinia
- 2013 Italian general election in Sardinia
- 2018 Italian general election in Sardinia
- 2022 Italian general election in Sardinia

== European Parliament elections ==
- 1979 European Parliament election in Sardinia
- 1984 European Parliament election in Sardinia
- 1989 European Parliament election in Sardinia
- 1994 European Parliament election in Sardinia
- 1999 European Parliament election in Sardinia
- 2004 European Parliament election in Sardinia
- 2009 European Parliament election in Sardinia
- 2014 European Parliament election in Sardinia
- 2019 European Parliament election in Sardinia
- 2024 European Parliament election in Sardinia
