= Politics of Sardinia =

Politics of region of Italy

The politics of Sardinia, a region of Italy, takes place in the framework of an "anomalous presidential" representative democracy or prime-ministerial system with an executive presidency, whereby the President of Regional Government is the head of government, and of a pluriform multi-party system. Executive power is exercised by the Regional Government. Legislative power is vested in both the government and the Regional Council of Sardinia.

== Executive branch ==
The Regional Government (Giunta Regionale) is presided by the President of the Region (Presidente della Regione), who is elected for a five-year term, and is composed by the President and the Ministers (Assessori), who are currently 12.

=== List of presidents ===
Elected by the Regional Council (1949–1994)

№	Name	Term of office		Political party	Legislature
1	Luigi Crespellani	31 May 1949	3 July 1953	DC	I (1949)
1	Luigi Crespellani	3 July 1953	21 January 1954	DC	II (1953)
2	Alfredo Corrias	21 January 1954	21 June 1955	DC	II (1953)
3	Giuseppe Brotzu	21 June 1955	2 July 1957	DC	II (1953)
3	Giuseppe Brotzu	2 July 1957	13 November 1958	DC	III (1957)
4	Efisio Corrias	13 November 1958	3 July 1961	DC	III (1957)
4	Efisio Corrias	3 July 1961	3 July 1965	DC	IV (1961)
4	Efisio Corrias	3 July 1965	16 March 1966	DC	V (1965)
5	Paolo Dettori	16 March 1966	14 February 1967	DC	V (1965)
6	Giovanni Del Rio	14 February 1967	3 July 1969	DC	V (1965)
6	Giovanni Del Rio	3 July 1969	2 February 1970	DC	VI (1969)
7	Lucio Abis	2 February 1970	5 January 1971	DC	VI (1969)
8	Antonio Giagu De Martini	5 January 1971	11 February 1972	DC	VI (1969)
9	Pietro Soddu	11 February 1972	18 March 1972	DC	VI (1969)
10	Salvator Angelo Spanu	18 March 1972	7 December 1972	DC	VI (1969)
(8)	Antonio Gagiu De Martini	7 December 1972	10 December 1973	DC	VI (1969)
(6)	Giovanni Del Rio	10 December 1973	3 July 1974	DC	VI (1969)
(6)	Giovanni Del Rio	3 July 1974	8 May 1976	DC	VII (1974)
(9)	Pietro Soddu	8 May 1976	31 July 1979	DC	VII (1974)
11	Mario Puddu	31 July 1979	25 September 1979	DC	VIII (1979)
12	Alessandro Ghinami	15 September 1979	7 October 1980	PSDI	VIII (1979)
(9)	Pietro Soddu	7 October 1980	12 November 1980	DC	VIII (1979)
(11)	Mario Puddu	12 November 1980	4 December 1980	DC	VIII (1979)
13	Francesco Rais	4 December 1980	18 May 1982	PSI	VIII (1979)
14	Mario Melis	18 May 1982	16 June 1982	PSd'Az	VIII (1979)
15	Angelo Rojch	16 June 1982	24 August 1984	DC	VIII (1979)
(14)	Mario Melis	24 August 1984	8 August 1989	PSd'Az	IX (1984)
16	Mario Floris	8 August 1989	13 November 1991	DC	X (1989)
17	Antonello Cabras	13 November 1991	5 August 1994	PSI	X (1989)

Directly-elected presidents (since 1994)

Note: Until 2004, Presidents could resign or lose a vote of confidence, and be replaced by the Regional Council.

N.	Portrait	President	Term of office		Tenure (Years and days)	Party	Coalition	Legislature	Ref.
18		Federico Palomba (1937– )	5 August 1994	9 August 1999	5 years, 4 days	PDS	PDS–PRC–FD	XI (1994)	
19		Mauro Pili (1966– )	9 August 1999	18 October 1999	70 days	FI	FI–AN–RS–CCD	XII (1999)	
20		Gian Mario Selis (1944– )	18 October 1999	16 November 1999	29 days	PPI	PDS–PPI–FD–Dem–SDI–PRC	XII (1999)	
(16)		Mario Floris (1937– )	16 November 1999	25 October 2001	1 year, 343 days	UDR	PDS–DL–UDR–FD–Dem–SDI–PRC	XII (1999)	
(19)		Mauro Pili (1966– )	25 October 2001	28 August 2003	1 year, 307 days	FI	FI–AN–RS–CCD	XII (1999)	
21		Italo Masala (1937– )	28 August 2003	26 June 2004	303 days	AN	FI–AN–RS–CCD	XII (1999)	
22		Renato Soru (1957– )	26 June 2004	27 February 2009	4 years, 246 days	DS; PD	PD–PS–PRC–SDI–UDEUR–PdCI–IdV	XIII (2004)	
23		Ugo Cappellacci (1960– )	27 February 2009	12 March 2014	5 years, 13 days	PdL; FI	PdL–UDC–RS–PSd'Az	XIV (2009)	
24		Francesco Pigliaru (1954– )	12 March 2014	20 March 2019	5 years, 8 days	PD	PD–SEL–PdS–RM–CD–PRC– UPC–PSI–IdV–FdV–iRS–LB	XV (2014)	
25		Christian Solinas (1976– )	20 March 2019	20 March 2024	5 years, 0 days	PSd'Az	Lega–PSd'Az–FI–RS–FdI–UDC	XVI (2019)	
26		Alessandra Todde (1969– )	20 March 2024	Incumbent	2 years, 213 days	M5S	PD–M5S–AVS–OC–PP–SF–PSI	XVII (2024)	

== Legislative branch ==
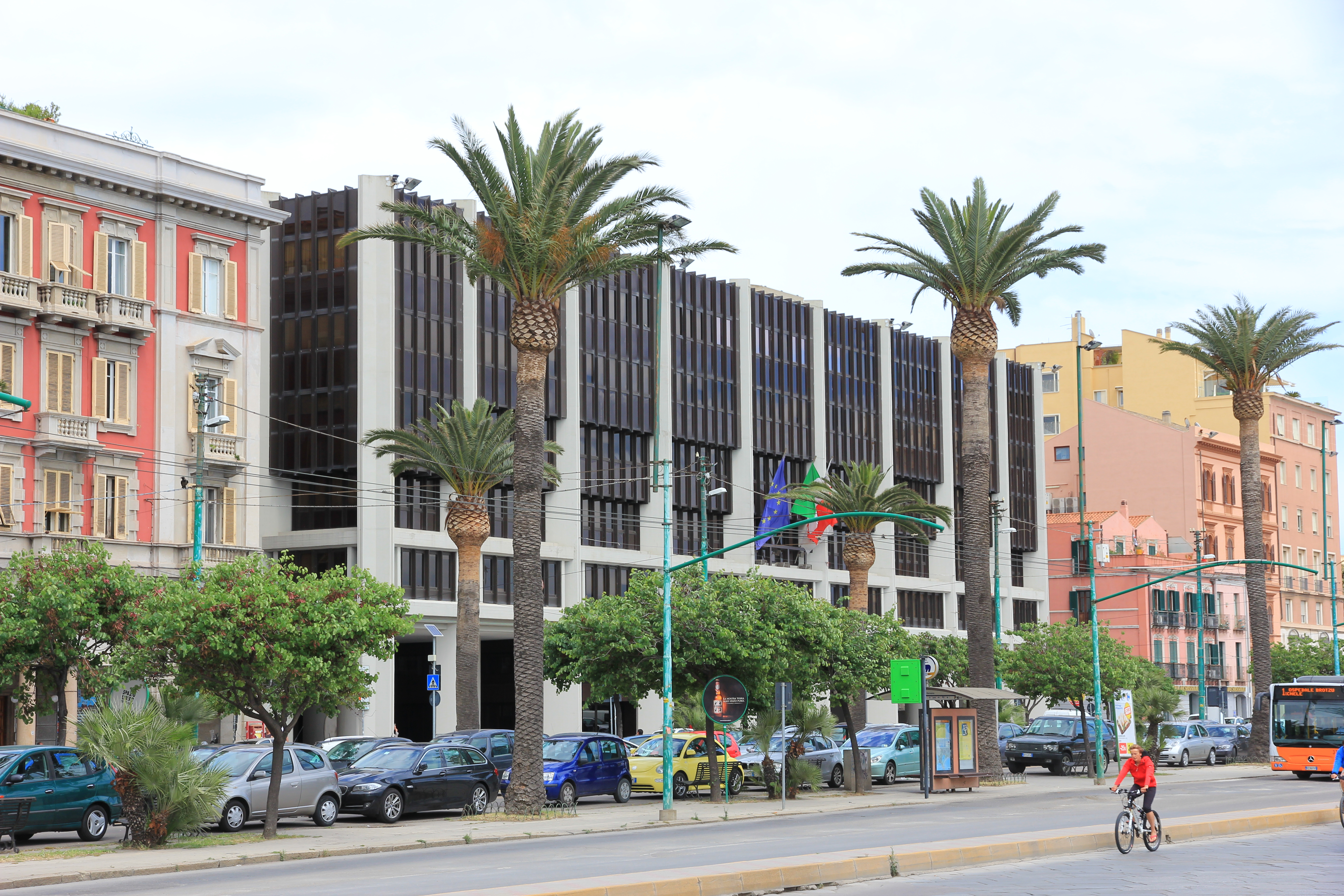
Regional Council of Sardinia

The Regional Council of Sardinia (Consiglio Regionale della Sardegna) is composed of 60 members. The Assembly is elected for a five-year term, but, if the President suffers a vote of no confidence, resigns or dies, under the simul stabunt vel simul cadent clause, the Assembly will be dissolved and there will be a fresh election.

=== Current composition ===
The Regional Council of Sardinia is currently composed of the following political groups:

Party	Seats	Status
Democratic Party (PD)	11 / 60	In government
Brothers of Italy (FdI)	10 / 60	In opposition
Five Star Movement (M5S)	8 / 60	In government
Forza Italia (FI)	6 / 60	In opposition
Greens and Left Alliance (AVS)	4 / 60	In government
Shared Horizon (OC)	4 / 60	In government
United for Todde (UpT)	4 / 60	In government
Future Left (SF)	3 / 60	In government
Sardinian Reformers (RS)	3 / 60	In opposition
Sardinia in the Centre – 20Twenty (SaC–20V)	3 / 60	In opposition
Mixed Group	2 / 60	External support
Mixed Group	2 / 60	In opposition

By coalition:

Coalition	Seats	Status
Centre-left coalition	36 / 60	Government
Centre-right coalition	24 / 60	Opposition

== Local government ==
=== Provinces ===
Sardinia is divided into six provinces (Gallura North-East Sardinia, Medio Campidano, Nuoro, Ogliastra, Oristano, and Sulcis Iglesiente) and two Metropolitan cities (Cagliari and Sassari).

Province	Inhabitants	President	Party	Election
Metropolitan City of Cagliari	534,219	Massimo Zedda (metropolitan mayor)	Ind.	2024
Metropolitan City of Sassari	311,132	Giuseppe Mascia (metropolitan mayor)	PD	2025
Gallura North-East Sardinia (list)	159,460	Settimo Nizzi	FI	2025
Medio Campidano (list)	89,155	Francesco Sanna	PD	2026
Nuoro (list)	142,241	Giuseppe Ciccolini	PD	2025
Ogliastra (list)	53,722	Alessio Seoni	PSdA	2025
Oristano (list)	146,785	Paolo Pireddu	FdI	2025
Sulcis Iglesiente (list)	117,780	Mauro Usai	PD	2025

=== Municipalities ===
Sardinia is also divided in 377 comuni (municipalities), which have even more history, having been established in the Middle Ages when they were the main places of government.

Provincial capitals

Municipality	Inhabitants	Mayor	Party	Election
Cagliari	154,106	Paolo Truzzu	Brothers of Italy	2019
Nuoro	36,316	Andrea Soddu	Independent	2015
Oristano	31,750	Andrea Lutzu	Forza Italia	2017
Sassari	127,018	Nanni Campus	Independent (centre-right)	2019

Others municipalities

Cities with 25,000+ inhabitants.

Municipality	Inhabitants	Mayor	Party	Election
Quartu Sant'Elena	70,453	Graziano Ernesto Milia	Independent (centre-left)	2020
Olbia	60,432	Settimo Nizzi	Forza Italia	2016
Alghero	43,964	Mario Conoci	Sardinian Action Party	2019
Selargius	28,666	Pier Luigi Concu	Forza Italia	2017
Carbonia	28,103	Paola Massidda	Five Star Movement	2016
Assemini	26,774	Sabrina Licheri	Five Star Movement	2018
Iglesias	26,678	Mauro Usai	Independent (centre-left)	2018

== Political parties and elections ==
=== Latest regional election ===
The latest regional election took place on 25 February 2024. Alessandra Todde of the Five Star Movement, at the head of a centre-left coalition centred on the Democratic Party, narrowly defeated Paolo Truzzu of Brothers of Italy, who replaced incumbent president Christian Solinas of the Sardinian Action Party as standard-bearer of the centre-right coalition. In a fragmented party system, with the presence of several regional and/or Sardinian nationalist parties, the Democratic Party was narrowly ahead of Brothers of Italy as largest party.

25 February 2024 Sardinia regional election results
Candidates	Votes	%	Seats	Parties	Votes	%	Seats
Alessandra Todde	334,160	45.4	1	Democratic Party	95,285	13.8	11
Alessandra Todde	334,160	45.4	1	Five Star Movement	53,613	7.8	7
Alessandra Todde	334,160	45.4	1	Greens and Left Alliance	32,145	4.7	4
Alessandra Todde	334,160	45.4	1	United for Alessandra Todde	27,422	4.0	3
Alessandra Todde	334,160	45.4	1	Shared Horizon	20,984	3.0	3
Alessandra Todde	334,160	45.4	1	Progressive Party	20,868	3.0	3
Alessandra Todde	334,160	45.4	1	Future Left	20,574	3.0	3
Alessandra Todde	334,160	45.4	1	Italian Socialist Party – SIE	11,637	1.7	1
Alessandra Todde	334,160	45.4	1	Fortza Paris	6,068	0.9	–
Alessandra Todde	334,160	45.4	1	Solidary Democracy	4,692	0.7	–
Alessandra Todde	334,160	45.4	1	Total	293,288	42.5	36
Paolo Truzzu	331,099	45.0	1	Brothers of Italy	93,921	13.6	7
Paolo Truzzu	331,099	45.0	1	Sardinian Reformers	49,629	7.2	3
Paolo Truzzu	331,099	45.0	1	Forza Italia	43,892	6.4	3
Paolo Truzzu	331,099	45.0	1	Sardinia in the Centre 2020	37,950	5.5	3
Paolo Truzzu	331,099	45.0	1	Sardinian Action Party	37,341	5.4	3
Paolo Truzzu	331,099	45.0	1	Sardinia Alliance – PLI	28,203	4.1	2
Paolo Truzzu	331,099	45.0	1	League Sardinia	25,957	3.8	1
Paolo Truzzu	331,099	45.0	1	Union of the Centre	19,237	2.8	1
Paolo Truzzu	331,099	45.0	1	Christian Democracy with Rotondi	2,110	0.3	–
Paolo Truzzu	331,099	45.0	1	Total	333,873	48.4	23
Renato Soru	63,666	8.7	–	Sardinia Project	23,872	3.5	–
Renato Soru	63,666	8.7	–	Vote Sardinia	10,830	1.6	–
Renato Soru	63,666	8.7	–	Action – More Europe – LDE – UPC	10,577	1.5	–
Renato Soru	63,666	8.7	–	Liberu	4,993	0.7	–
Renato Soru	63,666	8.7	–	Communist Refoundation Party	4,534	0.7	–
Renato Soru	63,666	8.7	–	Total	54,569	7.9	–
Lucia Chessa	7,261	1.0	–	Sardigna R-Esiste (incl. Red Moors)	4,067	0.6	–
Invalid votes	21,412	–					
Total candidates	736,186	100.00	2	Total parties	690.401	100.00	58
Registered voters	1,447,753						
Source: Autonomous Region of Sardinia – Results
