= List of presidents of Sardinia =

Presidents of region of Italy

This is the list of presidents of Sardinia since 1949.

== List ==
Elected by the Regional Council (1949–1994)

№	Name	Term of office		Political party	Legislature
1	Luigi Crespellani	31 May 1949	3 July 1953	DC	I (1949)
1	Luigi Crespellani	3 July 1953	21 January 1954	DC	II (1953)
2	Alfredo Corrias	21 January 1954	21 June 1955	DC	II (1953)
3	Giuseppe Brotzu	21 June 1955	2 July 1957	DC	II (1953)
3	Giuseppe Brotzu	2 July 1957	13 November 1958	DC	III (1957)
4	Efisio Corrias	13 November 1958	3 July 1961	DC	III (1957)
4	Efisio Corrias	3 July 1961	3 July 1965	DC	IV (1961)
4	Efisio Corrias	3 July 1965	16 March 1966	DC	V (1965)
5	Paolo Dettori	16 March 1966	14 February 1967	DC	V (1965)
6	Giovanni Del Rio	14 February 1967	3 July 1969	DC	V (1965)
6	Giovanni Del Rio	3 July 1969	2 February 1970	DC	VI (1969)
7	Lucio Abis	2 February 1970	5 January 1971	DC	VI (1969)
8	Antonio Giagu De Martini	5 January 1971	11 February 1972	DC	VI (1969)
9	Pietro Soddu	11 February 1972	18 March 1972	DC	VI (1969)
10	Salvator Angelo Spanu	18 March 1972	7 December 1972	DC	VI (1969)
(8)	Antonio Gagiu De Martini	7 December 1972	10 December 1973	DC	VI (1969)
(6)	Giovanni Del Rio	10 December 1973	3 July 1974	DC	VI (1969)
(6)	Giovanni Del Rio	3 July 1974	8 May 1976	DC	VII (1974)
(9)	Pietro Soddu	8 May 1976	31 July 1979	DC	VII (1974)
11	Mario Puddu	31 July 1979	25 September 1979	DC	VIII (1979)
12	Alessandro Ghinami	15 September 1979	7 October 1980	PSDI	VIII (1979)
(9)	Pietro Soddu	7 October 1980	12 November 1980	DC	VIII (1979)
(11)	Mario Puddu	12 November 1980	4 December 1980	DC	VIII (1979)
13	Francesco Rais	4 December 1980	18 May 1982	PSI	VIII (1979)
14	Mario Melis	18 May 1982	16 June 1982	PSd'Az	VIII (1979)
15	Angelo Rojch	16 June 1982	24 August 1984	DC	VIII (1979)
(14)	Mario Melis	24 August 1984	8 August 1989	PSd'Az	IX (1984)
16	Mario Floris	8 August 1989	13 November 1991	DC	X (1989)
17	Antonello Cabras	13 November 1991	5 August 1994	PSI	X (1989)

Directly-elected presidents (since 1994)

Note: Until 2004, Presidents could resign or lose a vote of confidence, and be replaced by the Regional Council.

N.	Portrait	President	Term of office		Tenure (Years and days)	Party	Coalition	Legislature	Ref.
18		Federico Palomba (1937– )	5 August 1994	9 August 1999	5 years, 4 days	PDS	PDS–PRC–FD	XI (1994)	
19		Mauro Pili (1966– )	9 August 1999	18 October 1999	70 days	FI	FI–AN–RS–CCD	XII (1999)	
20		Gian Mario Selis (1944– )	18 October 1999	16 November 1999	29 days	PPI	PDS–PPI–FD–Dem–SDI–PRC	XII (1999)	
(16)		Mario Floris (1937– )	16 November 1999	25 October 2001	1 year, 343 days	UDR	PDS–DL–UDR–FD–Dem–SDI–PRC	XII (1999)	
(19)		Mauro Pili (1966– )	25 October 2001	28 August 2003	1 year, 307 days	FI	FI–AN–RS–CCD	XII (1999)	
21		Italo Masala (1937– )	28 August 2003	26 June 2004	303 days	AN	FI–AN–RS–CCD	XII (1999)	
22		Renato Soru (1957– )	26 June 2004	27 February 2009	4 years, 246 days	DS; PD	PD–PS–PRC–SDI–UDEUR–PdCI–IdV	XIII (2004)	
23		Ugo Cappellacci (1960– )	27 February 2009	12 March 2014	5 years, 13 days	PdL; FI	PdL–UDC–RS–PSd'Az	XIV (2009)	
24		Francesco Pigliaru (1954– )	12 March 2014	20 March 2019	5 years, 8 days	PD	PD–SEL–PdS–RM–CD–PRC– UPC–PSI–IdV–FdV–iRS–LB	XV (2014)	
25		Christian Solinas (1976– )	20 March 2019	20 March 2024	5 years, 0 days	PSd'Az	Lega–PSd'Az–FI–RS–FdI–UDC	XVI (2019)	
26		Alessandra Todde (1969– )	20 March 2024	Incumbent	2 years, 215 days	M5S	PD–M5S–AVS–OC–PP–SF–PSI	XVII (2024)	
