= Regional Council of Sardinia =

Legislative organ of Sardinia, Italy

Regional Council of Sardinia: Consiglio Regionale della Sardegna; Cunsìgiu regionale de Sardìgna
- 17th Legislature

Type
- Type: Regional council Unicameral
- Established: 26 February 1948

Leadership
- President: Piero Comandini, PD since 9 April 2024

Structure
- Seats: 60
- Political groups: Government (35): PD (11); M5S (8); AVS (4); OC (4); UpT (4); SF (3); PP (2); Opposition (24): FdI (10); FI (6); RS (3); SaC–20V (3); AS–PLI (1); UDC (1)
- Length of term: 5 years

Elections
- Voting system: Party-list semi-proportional representation with majority bonus D'Hondt method
- Last election: 25 February 2024
- Next election: No later than 26 February 2029

Meeting place
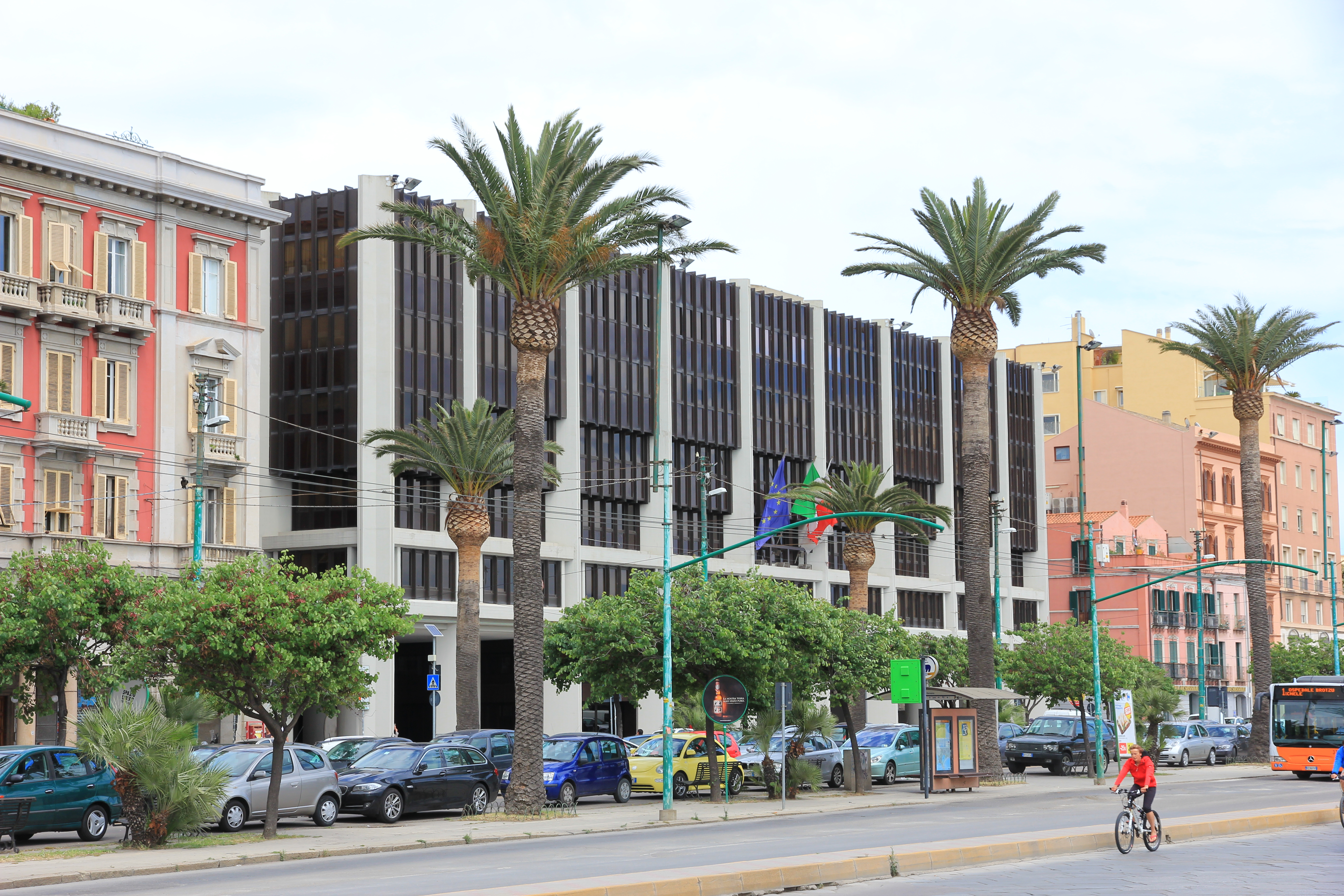
- Palace of the Regional Council, Cagliari

Website
- consiglio.regione.sardegna.it

The Regional Council of Sardinia (Italian: Consiglio Regionale della Sardegna;Sardinian: Cunsìgiu regionale de Sardìgna) is the legislative assembly of the autonomous region of Sardinia.

The assembly was established on 26 February 1948, while the first election took place on 8 May 1949.

== Composition ==
The Regional Council of Sardinia is composed of 60 members, of which 58 are elected in provincial constituencies with proportional representation, one is for the candidate for president who comes second, who usually becomes the leader of the opposition in the Council, and one is for the elected president.

The council is elected for a five-year term, but, if the president suffers a vote of no confidence, resigns or dies, under the simul stabunt vel simul cadent clause (introduced in 2004), also the Council will be dissolved and there will be a snap election.

Following the modification of the Regional Statute, in 2013 the number of regional councillors was reduced from 80 to 60.

=== Political groups (2024–2029) ===
The Regional Council of Sardinia is currently composed of the following political groups:

Party	Seats	Status
Democratic Party (PD)	11 / 60	In government
Brothers of Italy (FdI)	10 / 60	In opposition
Five Star Movement (M5S)	8 / 60	In government
Forza Italia (FI)	6 / 60	In opposition
Greens and Left Alliance (AVS)	4 / 60	In government
Shared Horizon (OC)	4 / 60	In government
United for Todde (UpT)	4 / 60	In government
Future Left (SF)	3 / 60	In government
Sardinian Reformers (RS)	3 / 60	In opposition
Sardinia in the Centre – 20Twenty (SaC–20V)	3 / 60	In opposition
Mixed Group	2 / 60	External support
Mixed Group	2 / 60	In opposition

By coalition:

Coalition	Seats	Status
Centre-left coalition	36 / 60	Government
Centre-right coalition	24 / 60	Opposition

=== Historical composition ===
Election	DC	PCI	PSI	PSdAZ	PRI	PLI	PSDI	MSI	PNM/PDIUM	Others	Total
8 May 1949	22	13	3	7		1	1	3	7	3	60
14 June 1953	30	15	5	4		1	1	4	5	0	60
16 June 1957	31	13	6	5		1	1	3	10	0	60
18 June 1961	37	14	7	5		1	2	4	2	0	60
13 June 1965	35	15	5	5		3	3	3	2	1	60
15 June 1969	36	15	9	3	1	3	0	2	2	3	60
16 June 1974	32	22	9	1	1	1	3	6		0	60
17 June 1979	32	22	9	3	3	1	4	4		2	60
24 June 1984	27	24	8	12	3		4	3		0	60
11 June 1989	29	19	12	10	3		4	3		0	60

Election	Government	Opposition	Council	President(s) of the Region
12–26 June 1994	Centre-left (Alliance of Progressives) 29 / 80	Centre-right (Pole of Good Government) 28 / 80 PPI 13 / 80 PS 6 / 80 PSdAZ 4 / 80		Federico Palomba (1994–1999)
13–27 June 1999	Centre-right (Pole for Freedoms) 37 / 80	Centre-left (The Olive Tree) 37 / 80 UDR 3 / 80 PSdAZ 3 / 80		Mauro Pili (1999); Gian Mario Selis (1999); Mario Floris (1999–2001); Mauro Pili (2001–2003); Italo Masala (2003–2004)
13 June 2004	Centre-left (The Olive Tree) 51 / 85	Centre-right (House of Freedoms) 30 / 85 UDS 2 / 80 PSdAZ 2 / 80		Renato Soru (2004–2009)
15 February 2009 (snap election)	Centre-right 53 / 80	Centre-left 27 / 80		Ugo Cappellacci (2009–2014)
16 February 2014	Centre-left 36 / 60	Centre-right 24 / 60		Francesco Pigliaru (2014–2019)
24 February 2019	Centre-right 36 / 60	Centre-left 18 / 60 M5S 6 / 60		Christian Solinas (2019–2024)
25 February 2024	Centre-left 36 / 60	Centre-right 24 / 60		Alessandra Todde (since 2024)

== Elections ==
8 May 1949	Legislative
14 June 1953	Legislative
16 June 1957	Legislative
18 June 1961	Legislative
13 June 1965	Legislative
15 June 1969	Legislative
16 June 1974	Legislative
17 June 1979	Legislative
24 June 1984	Legislative
11 June 1989	Legislative
12 and 26 June 1994	Presidential & Legislative
13 and 27 June 1999	Presidential & Legislative
13 June 2004	Presidential & Legislative
15 February 2009	Presidential & Legislative
16 February 2014	Presidential & Legislative
24 February 2019	Presidential & Legislative
25 February 2024	Presidential & Legislative

== Presidents (1949–present) ==
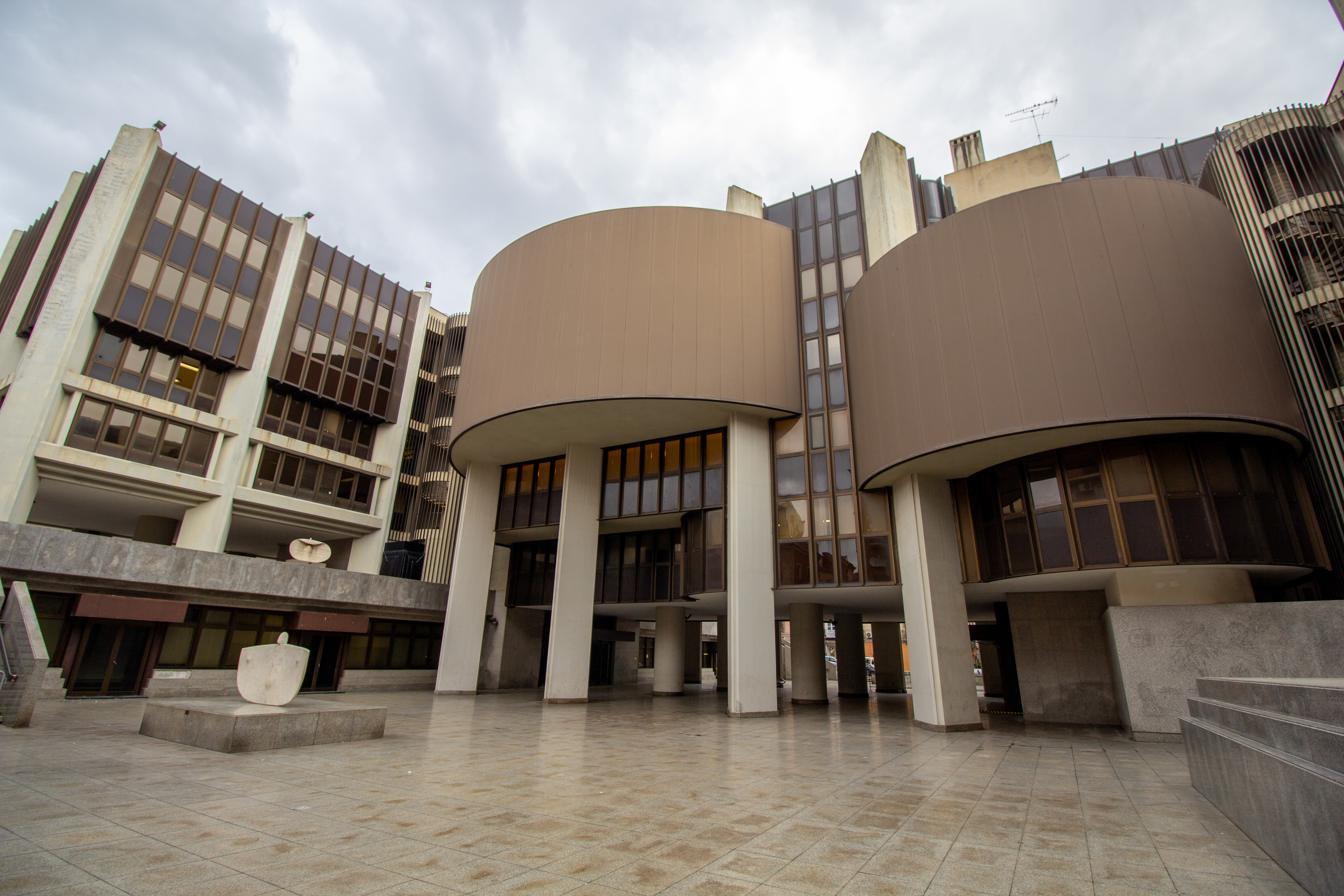
The main entrance of Palace of the Regional Council in Cagliari.

No.	Name	Legislature	Term of office		Party
1	Anselmo Contu	I	28 May 1949	1951	PSdAZ
2	Alfredo Corrias	I	1951	2 July 1953	DC
2	Alfredo Corrias	II	3 July 1953	1954	DC
3	Efisio Corrias	II	1954	2 July 1957	DC
3	Efisio Corrias	III	3 July 1957	1958	DC
4	Agostino Cerioni	III	1958	2 July 1961	DC
4	Agostino Cerioni	IV	3 July 1961	2 July 1965	DC
4	Agostino Cerioni	V	3 July 1965	1968	DC
5	Paolo Dettori	V	1968	2 July 1969	DC
6	Felice Contu	VI	3 July 1969	2 July 1974	DC
6	Felice Contu	VII	3 July 1974	1977	DC
7	Andrea Raggio	VII	1977	11 July 1979	PCI
8	Armando Corona	VIII	12 July 1979	1981	PRI
9	Alessandro Ghinami	VIII	1981	1983	PSDI
10	Francesco Rais	VIII	1983	27 July 1984	PSI
11	Emanuele Sanna	IX	28 July 1984	16 July 1989	PCI
12	Salvatorangelo Mereu	X	17 July 1989	1991	PSI
13	Mario Floris	X	1991	17 July 1994	DC
14	Gian Mario Selis	XI	18 July 1994	19 July 1999	PPI
15	Efisio Serrenti	XII	20 July 1999	13 July 2004	PSdAZ
16	Giacomo Spissu	XIII	14 July 2004	18 March 2009	DS
17	Claudia Lombardo	XIV	19 March 2009	19 March 2014	PdL
18	Gianfranco Ganau	XV	20 March 2014	19 March 2019	PD
19	Michele Pais	XVI	20 March 2019	8 April 2024	Lega
20	Piero Comandini	XVII	9 April 2024	Incumbent	PD

== See also ==
- Regional council
- Politics of Sardinia
- President of Sardinia
