= Sardinian nationalism =

Secessionist movement in Italy

Pre-1999 flag of Sardinia; it is similar to the traditional flag of Corsica.

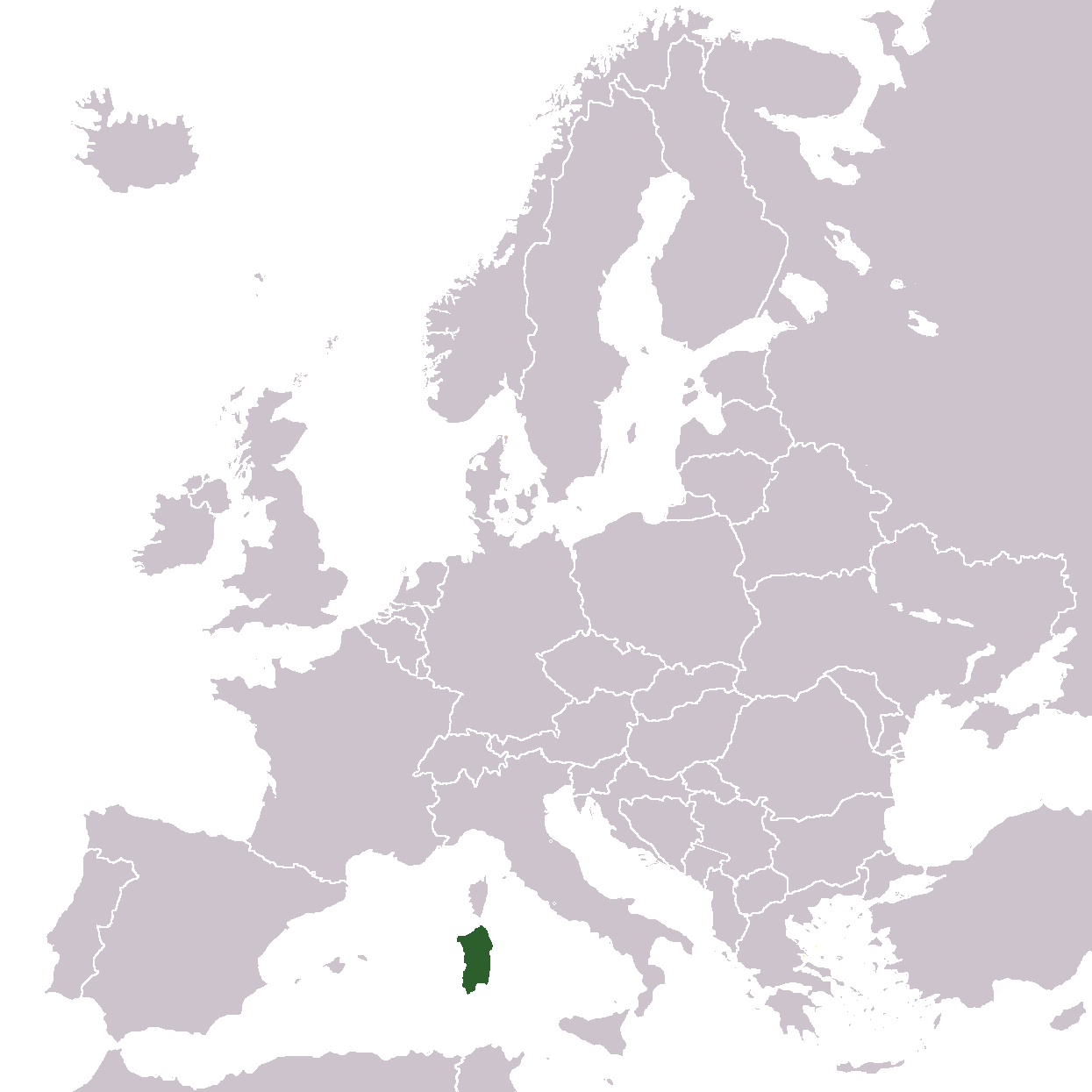
Location of Sardinia

Sardinian nationalism or also Sardism (Sardismu in Sardinian; Sardismo in Italian) is a social, cultural and political movement in Sardinia calling for the self-determination of the Sardinian people in a context of national devolution, further autonomy in Italy, or even outright independence from the latter. It also promotes the protection of the island's environment and the preservation of its cultural heritage.

Even though the island has been characterized by periodical waves of ethnonationalist protests against Rome, the Sardinian movement has its origins on the left of the political spectrum; regionalism and attempts for Sardinian self-determination historically countered in fact the Rome-centric Italian nationalism and fascism (which eventually managed to contain the autonomist and separatist tendencies). Over the years many Sardist parties from different ideological backgrounds have emerged (even on the right and the centre), all being in the minority, and with some of them making government coalitions of variable geometry with the statewide Italian parties. For instance, that also happened in the 2014 Sardinian regional election, where the combined result of all the nationalist parties had been 26% of the votes.

== History ==
In 1720, the Kingdom of Sardinia was definitely ceded by Spain to the House of Savoy after a plurisecular period of Spanish rule and a short-lived reconquest, abiding by the treaty of London that followed the War of Spanish Succession. The Savoyard kings, who were forced to accept this island in place of the much more populated and profitable Sicily, were not pleased with the exchange to the point of making them want to dispose of what Cavour called "the third Ireland" later, according to Mazzini who denounced part of the plot, by repeatedly trying to sell it to either Austria or France. For a long time, Sardinia would be ruled in the same way as it was during the Spanish period, with its own parliament and government being composed exclusively of men from the Mainland. The only exception to this has been a series of revolutionary outburst (known collectively as "Sardinian Vespers") against the local Piedmontese notables in 1794, later led by Giovanni Maria Angioy, which ended only in the first years of the 19th century but did not succeed and were ultimately suppressed.

In 1847, a segment of the Sardinian elites from Cagliari and Sassari, led by the unionist Giovanni Siotto Pintor, demanded the so-called Perfect Fusion, making it so that Sardinia could get the liberal reforms that were not available for the island because of its separate legal system, and that "the culture and civilization of the Italian Mainland would be transplanted, without any reserves and obstacles, to Sardinia"; some Sardinian deputies in the minority, such as Federico Fenu, Giorgio Asproni and Giovanni Battista Tuveri, strongly protested against the Savoyard policies and warned against the ramifications which Sardinia could face. In the end, the king Charles Albert agreed to the request from Turin; by doing so, he dissolved what political bodies remained that could exert a modicum of control on the king's decisions over the island. Moreover, the later enlargement moves in the Peninsula on the Savoyards' part, starting with the First Italian War of Independence, further aggravated the island's political and cultural marginalization with respect to the Mainland: Sardinia ended up being an even less significant overseas departement of the Savoyard domains, whose seat of power had always been located on the Italian peninsula. The episode would lead most of the Sardinian unionists, including Pintor himself, to regret having made that proposal (Errammo tutti, "we all made a mistake"), and would raise the "Sardinian Question" (questione sarda) from then on, a broad term used to cover a wide variety of issues regarding the difficult relationship between Sardinia and the mainland. It was in 1848 that the Sardinian intellectuals started to speak of "colonialism" in Sardinia.

The Savoyard kings proceeded to expand their domains through the Unification of Italy: Sardinia, being already part of the Piedmontese Kingdom from the very beginning, automatically joined the new polity, which changed its name to become the Kingdom of Italy in 1861.

=== 20th century ===
Sardism, which had been previously confined to the island's intellectuals, made its political debut for the first time on the occasion of Ireland's independence (1921) with Lussu's theories and the Sardinian Action Party or PSd'Az (one of the oldest parties in Europe advocating for regional self-determination), which got 36% of the popular vote in 1921 regional election. Sardinian nationalism thus established itself as the most important mass movement in Sardinia, and the Psd'Az a political force that Benito Mussolini eventually banned in 1926; the overt Sardists would then be forced into hiding and some of them participated in the main European fronts of anti-fascism (like Emilio Lussu, and Dino Giacobbe and Giuseppe Zuddas in the Spanish Civil War), while others decided to join the Fascist Party, hoping that by adhering to the regime Sardinia would get autonomy in exchange (a demand facing an immediate rejection) or at least some attention from the Mainland (which they eventually got through some moderate funding concentrated in Cagliari for the local infrastructures). Overall, rural Sardinia showed little interest in the Fascist state, let alone consent, while the bourgeois segments from the urban settlements were among the staunchest supporters of the regime on the island. Following the Second World War, the Psd'Az, already weakened by the loss of many of its key members during the conflict, suffered a first split between the moderate wing and a much more radical one, led by Sebastiano Pirisi, which developed into another party (Lega Sarda, "Sardinian League") but ultimately got poor results in the 1946 Italian general election.

The return of democracy coincided with the comeback of the previously cracked-down autonomist and separatist claims. A regional chamber to draft the Statute was created on 9 April 1945, but did not operate until as late as 26 April 1946, because of the slow pace of negotiations at each round of the talks. Lussu and the Sardinian Action Party championed in fact a solution that saw the island as a state associated with a federal country, rather than being assimilated like an ordinary Italian region within a unitary framework, but such demands were met with strong opposition from the Italian statewide parties: the Christian Democracy (DC), around which the majority of the island's notables were then gathered, supported in fact a generic regional framework with some devolution, geared towards accommodation for the central government in Rome; the Liberal Party (PLI) advocated for what little autonomy was needed to carry out only the administrative functions, without the capacity to create any regional laws; the Communist Party (PCI), which shut down the Communist Party of Sardinia two years earlier, was hostile to the idea of giving Sardinia any autonomy at all, the Italian Communists considering it a reactionary tool that stood in the way of a transformation towards a single Italian Communist society; the right-wing parties and the Common Man's Front were against the idea of Sardinian autonomy as well, because of Italian nationalism. In the end, the line prevailing was the one supported by the DC that, claiming to be willing to avoid "serious institutional conflicts", ditched the federal hypothesis in favour of a binary system of governance agreed upon the region and the central state. As much as some important authors in the field of Sardinian studies regard the granted Statute as Italy's definite acknowledgment of a distinct historical, geographic, social, ethnic and linguistic status, the "Sardinian specialty" as a criterion for political autonomy ended up being specified just on the grounds of a couple of socio-economic issues devoid of any of the aforementioned considerations. As time was pressing, the Sardinian regional Statute was eventually written by the Constituent Assembly in Rome, followed by a rapid review of each section and without further debate. Some unique articles appeared in the final version, mentioning state-funded plans (going by the Italian piani di rinascita "rebirth plans") for the heavy industrial development of the island.

One hundred years had passed since the Perfect Fusion, when Sardinia became an autonomous region of Italy. However, the Statute upon which the autonomy was effectively based fell short of many Sardists' expectations. Upon viewing the draft of the Statute, Lussu's laconic comment was «this autonomy might as well fit into the family of federalism like a cat into the lion's». The lawyer Gonario Pinna went as far as stating «the form of autonomy being currently promulgated is far from providing the island with a serious and organic capacity of self-rule, but rather hollows out its fundamental principles and shall lead to harsh disappointments whenever translated into practice». The Psd'Az suffered another serious split in July, when Lussu left and founded the short-lived Sardinian Socialist Action Party.

The Sardist movement experienced a new wave of support at the end of the '60s, when the Sardinian society started becoming aware that its cultural heritage had been gradually vanishing; growing inequality was also being produced by a dual-economic structure, with the labour and resources being moved to the sector focused on the petrochemical industry (particularly fostered by the PCI) and the Italian, NATO and U.S. military installations. By the '70s, Sardist claims were widespread with the support of many springing Grassroots organisations; they ranged from supporting of the Sardinian Action Party to having harshly critical views towards it, and were also ideologically diverse: for example, the catholic Unione Democratiga pro s'Indipendentzia de sa Sardigna ("Democratic Union for Sardinian Independence") and the socialist Liga de Unidade Nazionale pro s'Indipendentzia de sa Sardigna e su Socialismu ("League of National Union for Sardinian Independence and Socialism"), competing with each other based on their beliefs, were both founded in 1967. Some cultural circles, like Città-Campagna and Su Populu Sardu, also drew militants from the extra-parliamentary groups based on the island, and saw many Sardinian university students joining in. The youth wings in the town of Orgosolo were particularly active against land dispossession and the militarization of the grazing lands. In 1978, the movement Sardenya y Llibertat ("Sardinia and Freedom") was founded by Carlo Sechi and Rafael Caria in the city of Alghero.

The Psd'Az experienced another comeback in the 1980s. In the 1984 regional election the party peaked at 30% in Cagliari and over 20% in Sassari and Oristano, gaining overall 13.8% of the vote: therefore, due to its pivotal role in the newly elected Regional Council, Sardist Mario Melis was President of Sardinia from 1984 to 1989, when it managed to get 12.5% of the vote. Ever since, that result has not been repeated yet by the Sardinian Action Party, let alone any of the splinter groups emerging from it.

=== 21st century ===
The Sardinian nationalist movement is in fact rather disjointed and lacking in unity nowadays: it is composed mostly of several local and scattered grassroots organisations across the island that do not have a clear central policy-making authority, and besides, the different nationalist subgroups often disagree with each other on many key issues. Sardinian nationalists address a number of issues, such as the environmental damage caused by the military forces (in fact, 60% of such bases in Italy are located on the island), the financial and economic exploitation of the island's resources by the Italian state and mainland industrialists, the lack of any political representation both in Italy and in the European Parliament (due to an unbalanced electoral constituency that still remains to this day, Sardinia has not had its own MEP since 1994), the nuclear power and waste (on which a referendum was proposed by a Sardist party, being held in 2011) and the ongoing process of depopulation and Italianization that would destroy the Sardinian indigenous culture.

Sardinian nationalism is a pacific movement that does not advocate violent revolution, proposing instead to achieve its goals within a liberal democratic framework. However, as an exception to the rule, there had been some issues in the past strictly related to separatist tendencies, the most worth mentioning being essentially three. First, the actions planned in 1968 by Giangiacomo Feltrinelli to turn the island into the Cuba of the Mediterranean and "liberate it from colonialism" by making contact with several local nationalist groups; in the end, the attempt of the famous communist thinker to strengthen the pro-independence militant lines, divided into the socialist Fronte Nazionale de Liberazione de sa Sardigna (FNLS) and the rightist Movimentu Nazionalista Sardu (MNS), was nullified by the Italian secret military intelligence. Secondly, there had been in the 1980s the question of the so-called "separatist conspiracy", a secret plan apparently set up by some local activists to reach the island's independence in collaboration with Gaddafi's Libya; according to some reconstructions of the facts, the supposed Sardinian separatist conspiracy might have been a machination of the Italian secret services seeking to discredit the rising nationalist wave in the island. There were also separatist militant groups, like the Movimento Armato Sardo (Sardinian Armed Movement), claiming assassinations and several kidnappings. Finally, it should be mentioned the case of a number of bombings, the most notable of which being that in 2004 against Silvio Berlusconi in his visit to Porto Rotondo (Olbia) with Tony Blair; the responsibility has been apparently claimed by some unknown anarcho-separatist militant groups, the presence of which has not been seen again.

In 2012, a vote in the Sardinian Assembly to pass an independence referendum bill failed by one vote.

In 2017, a Sardinian independence campaigner going by the name of Salvatore (Doddore in Sardinian) Meloni died after a two-month hunger and thirst strike while imprisoned at Uta.

== Popularity ==
In the 1970s, around 38% of the Sardinian population expressed a favourable view on independence. In 1984, another poll made by the second most widespread Sardinian newspaper La Nuova Sardegna also reported frustrations with the Italian central government in Sardinia, with the regionalist opinion being split across a spectrum ranging from calls for more autonomy in Italy to total independence from Italy. According to a 2012 survey conducted in a joint effort between the University of Cagliari and that of Edinburgh, 41% of Sardinians would be in favour of independence (with 10% choosing it from both Italy and the European Union, and 31% only from Italy with Sardinia remaining in the EU), whilst another 46% would rather have a larger autonomy within Italy and the EU, including fiscal power; 12% of people would be content to remain part of Italy and the EU with a Regional Council without any fiscal powers, and 1% in Italy and the EU without a Regional Council and fiscal powers.

Besides, the same survey reported a Moreno question giving the following results: (1) Sardinian, not Italian, 26%; (2) more Sardinian than Italian, 37%; (3) equally Sardinian and Italian, 31%; (4) more Italian than Sardinian, 5%; (5) Italian, not Sardinian, 1%. A 2017 poll by the Ixè Institute found that 51% of those questioned identified as Sardinian (as opposed to an Italian average of 15% identifying by their region of origin), rather than Italian (19%), European (11%) and/or citizen of the world (19%).

All these numerical data have been exposed by researchers like Carlo Pala, a political scientist at the University of Sassari. Even other polls, published by professional organizations for public opinion research, contribute to corroborating, to a varying degree, these findings and their accuracy.

However, this support has heretofore failed to translate into electoral success for pro-sovereignty Sardinian forces and a vigorous political action. In fact, this strong sense of regional identity does not seem to benefit any regional party at all, as it is also combined with lack of political engagement and a general distrust in institutions and parties, including those putting emphasis on Sardinian identity; moreover, the nationalist movement has a well-documented history of fractionalization: all attempts to unify the nationalist subgroups have so far failed; thus, the Sardist movement still suffers from being highly fragmented into a large number of political subgroups pushing different policies. All the Sardist parties put together usually win around 10–20% of the vote in regional elections, with not a single one managing to emerge as a serious competitor to the statewide parties. Such disconnect between societal views and political capitalization is called by some scholars, like Pala, the "disorganic connection of the regionalist actors" (connessione disorganica degli attori regionalisti).

Unlike other European regions with nationalist tendencies, even the local branches of statewide parties have incorporated regionalist elements in their political agenda, thus undermining the once distinctive Sardist demands: it is to be mentioned, for example, Francesco Cossiga's constitutional bill n. 352 to reform the Sardinian Statute, which ended up being eventually rejected by the Italian Parliament and aimed to recognize the island as a distinct nation within Italy, and to grant it the right to self-determination. The nationalist parties have disjointedly responded to the long-term accommodation strategy promoted by the statewide ones: some refused to team up, while others tried to work with the pro-Italian parties as coalition partners, in the hopes of applying further pressure from within to favour increased devolution; either choice has been met with diffidence by the Sardinian electorate, leading the various Sardist parties to play a marginal role in Sardinian politics.

In the 2014 regional election, for instance, more than a dozen Sardist parties of different connotations took part in the electoral competition, but yet again, because of their number and political fragmentation, they did not manage to win as many seats as they were initially supposed to, some think even because of a tactical mistake by the ProgReS-sponsored list, which was then led by the novelist Michela Murgia. Despite the combined result of all of the nationalist parties being around 26%, as estimated by La Nuova Sardegna (dropping to 18% for the pro-independence forces), they won only eight seats in the Sardinian regional council.

In February 2019 the secretary of the separatist Sardinian Action Party was elected President of the Autonomous Region with 47.82% of votes.

=== Party support ===
Here is a summary of the results of the regionalist parties participating in the regional elections and promoting stances ranging from increased autonomy to independence:

1949 party support

Party	Votes	Percentage	Seats
Sardinian Action Party	60,525	10.4%	7
Sardinian Socialist Action Party	38,081	6.6%	3
TOTAL:	98,606	17%	10

1953 party support

Party	Votes	Percentage	Seats
Sardinian Action Party	43,215	7%	4
TOTAL:	43,215	7%	4

1957 party support

Party	Votes	Percentage	Seats
Sardinian Action Party	40,214	6%	5
TOTAL:	40,214	6%	5

1961 party support

Party	Votes	Percentage	Seats
Sardinian Action Party	50,039	7.2%	5
TOTAL:	50,039	7.2%	5

1965 party support

Party	Votes	Percentage	Seats
Sardinian Action Party	44,621	6.4%	5
TOTAL:	44,621	6.4%	5

1969 party support

Party	Votes	Percentage	Seats
Sardinian Action Party	32,395	4.4%	3
Autonomist Sardist Party	22,187	3%	1
TOTAL:	54,582	7.4%	4

1974 party support

Party	Votes	Percentage	Seats
Sardinian Action Party	24,780	3.1%	1
TOTAL:	24,780	3.1%	1

1979 party support

Party	Votes	Percentage	Seats
Sardinian Action Party	30,238	3.3%	3
TOTAL:	30,238	3.3%	3

1984 party support

Party	Votes	Percentage	Seats
Sardinian Action Party	136,720	13.8%	12
TOTAL:	136,720	13.8%	12

1989 party support

Party	Votes	Percentage	Seats
Sardinian Action Party	127,765	12.5%	10
TOTAL:	127,765	12.5%	10

1994 party support

Party	Votes	Percentage	Seats
Sardinian Action Party	47,000	5.1%	4
Sardinia Nation	25,749	2.8%	0
TOTAL:	72,749	7.9%	4
Combined result of the Sardist presidential candidates: 82,645 (9.5%)

1999 party support

Party	Votes	Percentage	Seats
Sardinian Action Party	38,422	4.5%	3
Sardinian Reformers	38,259	4.4%	3
Union of Sardinians	35,177	4.1%	3
Sardinia Nation	15,283	1,8	0
TOTAL:	127,141	14.8%	9
Combined result of the Sardist presidential candidates: 158,131 (20.4%)

2004 party support

Party	Votes	Percentage	Seats
Sardinia Project	66,690	7.8%	7
Sardinian Reformers	50,953	6.0%	4
Fortza Paris	39,086	4.6%	3
Sardinian Action Party	32,859	3.9%	2
Union of Sardinians	33,302	3.9%	2
Independence Republic of Sardinia	5,672	0.7%	0
Sardinia Nation	3,249	0.4%	0
TOTAL:	231,811	27.3%	18
Combined result of the Sardist presidential candidates: 90,818 (9.31%)

2009 party support

Party	Votes	Percentage	Seats
Sardinian Reformers	56,056	6.78%	5
Sardinian Action Party	35,428	4.29%	4
Union of Sardinians	28,928	3.50%	2
Red Moors	21,034	2.54%	1
Fortza Paris	18,500	2.24%	1
Independence Republic of Sardinia	17,141	2.07%	0
Sardinia Nation	3,695	0.44%	0
TOTAL:	180,782	21.9%	13
Combined result of the Sardist presidential candidates: 34,956 (3.61%)

2014 party support

Party	Votes	Percentage	Seats
Sardinian Reformers	41,060	6.02%	3
Sardinian Action Party	31,886	4.67%	2
Unidos	19,356	2.83%	0
Project Republic of Sardinia	18,845	2.76%	0
Party of Sardinians	18,178	2.66%	2
Red Moors	17,980	2.63%	2
Union of Sardinians	17,728	2.60%	1
Gentes	15,271	2.24%	0
Comunidades	12,074	1.77%	0
Sardinia Free Zone Movement	11,150	1.63%	1
Independence Republic of Sardinia	5,599	0.82%	1
Free Zone Movement	5,079	0.74%	0
Fortza Paris	5,018	0.73%	0
The Base Sardinia	4,897	0.71%	1
United Independentist Front	4,772	0.70%	0
Sovereignty	1,231	0.18%	0
TOTAL:	230,124	33.69%	13
Combined result of the Sardist presidential candidates: 131,928 (17.87%)

2019 party support

Party	Votes	Percentage	Seats
Sardinian Action Party	69,892	9.9%	6
Sardinian Reformers	35,521	5.03%	3
Party of Sardinians	26,084	3.7%	0
We, Sardinia	19,867	2.81%	2
Free Sardinians	15,125	2.14%	0
Self-determination	13,448	1.90%	0
Fortza Paris	11,552	1.63%	1
Union of Sardinians	7,798	1.77%	1
TOTAL:	199,287	28.23%	13
Combined result of the Sardist presidential candidates: 419,970 (55.29%)

2024 party support

Party	Votes	Percentage	Seats
Sardinian Reformers	49,629	7.2%	3
Sardinian Action Party	37,341	5.4%	3
Sardinia Alliance	28,203	4.1%	2
Sardinia Project	23,872	3.5%	0
Shared Horizon	20,984	3.0%	3
Vote Sardinia	10,830	1.6%	0
Fortza Paris	6,068	0.9%	0
Liberu	4,993	0.7%	0
Sardigna R-Esiste	4,067	0.6%	0
TOTAL:	185,987	26.93%	11
Combined result of the Sardist presidential candidates: 70,927 (9.63%)

== See also ==
- Sardinian people
- Sardinian language
- Nuragic civilization
- Politics of Sardinia
- Republic of Mal di Ventre
- Corsican nationalism
- Corsican autonomy

== Bibliography ==
- Simon-Mossa (A.), Le ragioni dell’indipendentismo, Quartu Sant’Elena, Alfa, 2008 (original edition: 1969).
- Sergio Salvi – (1973) Le nazioni proibite, Vallecchi, Firenze
- Farnè (R.) – (1975) La Sardegna che non vuole essere una colonia, Milano, Jaca Book.
- Antonio Lepori, Antonello Satta e Giovanni Lilliu Sardigna on MINORANZE num. 4, Milan, trimestre 1976.
- Antonello Satta – (1977) L'autonomia della Sardigna come mistificazione.
- Imma Tubella i Casadevall e Eduard Vinyamata Camp – (1978) Les nacions de l'Europa capitalista – La Magrana, Barcelona.
- Melis (G.) – (1979) Dal sardismo al neosardismo: crisi autonomistica e mitologia locale, Il Mulino, XXXVIII, n° 263.
- Gerdes (D.) – (1980) Aufstand der Provinz. Regionalismus in Westeuropa, Frankfurt s.M. and New York, Campus.
- Rokkan (S.) and Urwin (D.W.) – (1982) The Politics of territorial identity : studies in European regionalism, London, Sage.
- Rokkan (S.) and Urwin (D.W.) – (1983) Economy, territory, identity : politics of West European peripheries, London, Sage.
- Rolando del Guerra e Genoveva Gómez – (1986) Llengua, dialecte, nació, ètnia (Llengua i poder a Itàlia) – La Magrana, Col. Alliberament, 19 Barcelona.
- Valle (N.) – (1988), L’idea autonomistica in Sardegna, Cagliari, Il Convegno.
- Gianfranco Contu – (1990) La questione nazionale sarda – Quartu Sant'Elena, Alfa Editrice
- Antonio Lepori, La Sardegna sarà redenta dai sardi: viaggio nel pensiero sardista, 1991, Edizioni Castello, Cagliari
- Hechter (M.) – (1992) The Dynamics of Secession, Acta Sociologica, vol. 35
- Petrosino (D.) – (1992), National and regional movements in Italy : the case of Sardinia, in Coakley (J.), The social origins of nationalist movements, London, Sage
- Aldo Accardo, La nascita del mito della nazione sarda, 1996, Edizione AM&D, Cagliari, 88-86799-04-7
- Gianfranco Pintore, La sovrana e la cameriera: la Sardegna tra sovranità e dipendenza, 1996, Insula, Nuoro, 978-88-86111-04-1
- Palo Pisu, Partito comunista di Sardegna: storia di un sogno interrotto, 1996, Insula, Nuoro, 88-86111-06-1
- Contu (A.) – (1996), Il pensiero federalista in Sardegna, Cagliari, Condaghes
- Xosé M. Núñez Seixas – (1998) Movimientos nacionalistas en Europa en el siglo XX – Ed. Síntesis, Col. Historia Universal Contemporánea, 26 Madrid.
- Eve Hepburn – (2007). The New Politics of Autonomy: Territorial Strategies and the Uses of European Integration by Political Parties in Scotland, Bavaria and Sardinia 1979–2005. European University Institute, Department of Political and Social Sciences.
- Eve Hepburne – (2008) Island Nations in a ‘Europe of the Peoples’: Corsica and Sardinia compared
- Pala (C.) – (2008) La sopravvivenza prima di tutto : voti ed eletti di due partiti etnoregionalisti in Sardegna e Bretagna, Quaderni dell’Osservatorio Elettorale, vol. 60, n° 2.
- Eve Hepburne – (2010). Using Europe: territorial party strategies in a multi-level system, Manchester University Press, ISBN 978-0-7190-8138-5
- Bachisio Bandinu – (2010) Pro s'Indipendentzia – Edizioni il Maestrale
- Pala (C.) – (2010), Quando il cleavage etnoterritoriale si addormenta : la "connessione disorganica" degli attori regionalisti in Sardegna e Bretagna, Partecipazione e Conflitto, vol. 2, n° 2
- Elias (A.) et Tronconi (F.), – (2011) From protest to power. Autonomist parties and the challenges of representation, Vienna, Braumüller
- Ilenia Ruggiu, Francesco Mola, Gianmario Demuro – (2013) Identità e Autonomia in Sardegna e Scozia – Maggioli Editore
- Roux (C.) – (2013) La nationalisation des périphéries. Fragments du processus de construction nationale en Corse et Sardaigne, Paris, L’Harmattan
- Adriano Bomboi – (2014) L'indipendentismo sardo. Le ragioni, la storia, i protagonisti – Cagliari, Edizioni Condaghes
- Franciscu Sedda – (2015) Manuale d'indipendenza nazionale – Cagliari, Edizioni Della Torre
- Carlo Pala (2015). Sardinia. The Wiley Blackwell Encyclopedia of Race, Ethnicity, and Nationalism. 1–3.
- Carlo Pala (2016). Idee di Sardegna, ISBN 9788843082902.
