= Columbu =

Columbu is an Italian surname. Notable people with the surname include:

- Franco Columbu (1941–2019), Italian actor, author, and bodybuilder
- Michele Columbu (1914–2012), Italian politician and writer
