= Pact for Autonomies =

The Pact for Autonomies (Italian: Patto per le Autonomie) was an electoral pact signed by Lega Nord (LN), a federation of regionalist parties active in Northern and Central Italy, and the Movement for the Autonomy (MpA), a Sicilian-based regionalist party, for the 2006 general election.

The two parties filed common lists for the Chamber of Deputies: in Northern and Central Italy the candidates were provided by LN, while in Lazio and Southern Italy by the MpA. As part of the pact, Giacomo Sanna, leader of the Sardinian Action Party (PSd'Az), stood as candidate for the Senate in the LN's list in Lombardy. At the Chamber the LN–MpA list obtained just 4.6% and 26 deputies (21 in the North for LN and 5 in the South for the MpA), while at the Senate Sanna was not elected.

The electoral pact was soon disbanded with LN and the MpA finding themselves often on opposite sides of the political debate.
