= Communist Party of Sardinia =

Communist Party of Sardinia Partidu Comunista de Sardigna Partito Comunista di Sardegna
- Leader: Giovanni Antioco Mura
- Founded: 1943
- Dissolved: 1944
- Ideology: Marxism−Leninism

The Communist Party of Sardinia (Italian: Partito Comunista di Sardegna; Sardinian: Partidu Comunista de Sardigna; abbreviated PCS) was a communist and separatist political party active in Sardinia.

== History ==
The PCS was founded in 1943 by Giovanni Antioco Mura, a socialist and independentist activist whose political and civil engagement was well known amongst the locals (he also founded some farmer and shepherd cooperatives), and Antonio Cassitta, a former militant of the Italian Communist Party near to Bordiga's faction. The PCS was active mainly in the province of Sassari, but its presence was also pretty strong in the other parts of the island.

This small Mediterranean communist party had an original and ambitious program. Adhering to the Marxist-Leninist principles and adopting those of the Soviet Constitution (which was also transcribed in the party's political manifesto), the PCS advocated the establishment of an independent Socialist Republic of Sardinia, set in a wider Soviet Federative Republic. This political position was in accordance with the policy of the recently dissolved Third International and with the theses emerging from the Congress of Lyon as well, which had been held in 1926 by the Italian Communist Party. This Soviet Federation they have been proposing would not comprise only territories belonging to the Italian state, as one can deduce by the fact that Italy was not even expressly mentioned in the PCS' political manifesto. Needless to say, this project was fiercely met with hostility by the Italian Communist Party, which at that time was still opposed to the very idea of granting the island a special autonomy. There were also moments of tension, such as when some activists of PCI assaulted and occupied the Sassarese PCS' venue (which later would have become the FGCI's one, the youth organization of PCI).

The PCS had some political relations with grassroots Sardist militants across the villages of Logudoro. This small Sardinian party was so short-lived, that by the end of 1944 was partly absorbed by the Italian Communist Party, though its leader Giovanni Antioco Mura would decide to remain off. As a consequence, the PCS did not manage to participate in any election.

== Bibliography ==
- Giovanni Antioco Mura, Sardegna Irredenta, Gastaldi, 1953
- Giovanni Antioco Mura, L'internazionale e la guerra, Gastaldi, 1958
- Giovanni Antioco Mura, S'incunza, Gastaldi, 1952
- Gianfranco Contu - Francesco Casula, Storia dell'Autonomia in Sardegna. Dall'800 allo Statuto, Stampa Grafica del Parteolla, 2008, pag.24.
- Paolo Pisu - Partito Comunista di Sardegna. Storia di un sogno interrotto - Nùoro, Insula, 1996.
- Per una biografia politica di Giovanni Antioco Mura, in «Archivio sardo del movimento operaio contadino e autonomistico», n°3, dicembre 1974, pp. 177–199.
