= Sardinian Socialist Action Party =

Sardinian Socialist Action Party Partito Sardo d'Azione Socialista
- Founder: Emilio Lussu
- Founded: 1948
- Dissolved: 1949
- Split from: Sardinian Action Party
- Merged into: Italian Socialist Party
- Headquarters: Cagliari, Sardinia, Italy
- Ideology: Sardinian nationalism Regionalism; Autonomism; Social democracy Socialism
- Political position: Left-wing
- Regional Council of Sardinia (1948-1949): 3 / 60

The Sardinian Socialist Action Party (Italian: Partito Sardo d'Azione Socialista, PSd'AzS) was a regionalist social-democratic political party active in Sardinia.

== History ==
The party was founded in 1948 by a split from the Sardinian Action Party led by Emilio Lussu, former member of the "Sassari brigade" during the Italian resistance movement. The party won 6.6% in the first regional election in 1949 and shortly after merged with the Italian Socialist Party, a party of which Lussu was a senator until 1963.
