= Corrias =

Corrias is a surname. Notable people with the surname include:

- Alfredo Corrias (1895–1985), Italian lawyer and politician
- Pilar Corrias (born 1969), founder of Pilar Corrias, British contemporary art gallery
