= 2019 European Parliament election in Sardinia =

The European Parliament election of 2019 took place in Italy on 26 May 2019.

In Sardinia the League, which included the Sardinian Action Party, came first with 27.7% of the vote (country-level result 34.3%), slightly ahead of the Five Star Movement (25.7%) and the Democratic Party (24.3%). Forza Italia came a distant fourth (7.8%), ahead of Brothers of Italy (6.2%), The Left (2.2%), More Europe (2.1%) and Green Europe (1.6%). No Sardinian candidate was elected to the European Parliament, due to the strength of Sicilians in the Islands constituency.

== Results ==
Party	Votes	%
League	135,496	27.7
Five Star Movement	126,301	25.7
Democratic Party	119,260	24.3
Forza Italia	38,389	7.8
Brothers of Italy	30,681	6.2
The Left	10,710	2.2
More Europe	10,269	2.1
Green Europe	7,863	1.6
others	12,485	2.5
Total	491,454	100.00

Source: Ministry of the Interior
