= Giacomo Sanna =

Italian politician (born 1949)

President of the Province of Sassari
- In office 7 August 1990 – 12 June 1994
- Preceded by: Vittorio Franco Sanna
- Succeeded by: Antonio Pompedda

Member of the Regional Council of Sardinia
- In office 2 August 1994 – 15 June 2004
- In office 18 March 2009 – 12 March 2014

Secretary of the Sardinian Action Party
- In office July 2000 – December 2006
- Preceded by: Antonio Delitala
- Succeeded by: Efisio Trincas

President of the Sardinian Action Party
- In office July 2006 – October 2015
- Preceded by: Silvano Cadoni
- Succeeded by: Giovanni Columbu

Personal details
- Born: 9 February 1949 (age 77) Sassari, Italy
- Party: Sardinian Action Party

Giacomo Sanna (born 9 February 1949) is an Italian politician and a member of the Sardinian Action Party who served as president of the Province of Sassari from 1990 to 1994.

In the 1994 Sardinian election, he was elected to the Regional Council of Sardinia. Under the first centre-left regional government headed by Federico Palomba, he was appointed regional assessor for Transport. In July 2000, Sanna was elected national secretary of the Sardinian Action Party, and six years later he became national president of the party.

In the 2010 municipal election, Sanna ran for mayor of Sassari as the centre-right candidate. He received 23,505 votes (32.75%), finishing second behind centre-left candidate Gianfranco Ganau, who was elected with 65.9% of the vote.

In January 2023, Sanna was sentenced by the Court of Cagliari to two years and eight months' imprisonment in a case concerning the misuse of funds allocated to regional political groups during the 13th legislature.
