= 1983 Italian general election in Sardinia =

The Italian general election of 1983 took place on 26 June 1983. Christian Democracy was the largest party in Sardinia.

== Results ==
=== Chamber of Deputies ===
Parties	votes	votes (%)	seats
Christian Democracy	306,660	31.7	6
Italian Communist Party	279,127	28.8	6
Italian Socialist Party	98,179	10.1	2
Sardinian Action Party	91,923	9.5	1
Italian Social Movement	60,670	6.3	1
Italian Democratic Socialist Party	37,253	3.9	1
Italian Republican Party	29,505	3.1	-
Pensioners' Party	16,128	1.7	-
Radical Party	15,121	1.6	-
Proletarian Democracy	14,598	1.5	-
Italian Liberal Party	14,353	1.5	-
Others	4,774	0.5	-
Total	968,291	100.0	17

Source: Ministry of the Interior

=== Senate ===
Parties	votes	votes (%)	seats
Christian Democracy	261,147	33.0	4
Italian Communist Party	241,571	30.5	3
Italian Socialist Party	87,410	11.1	1
Sardinian Action Party	76,797	9.7	1
Italian Social Movement	57,525	7.3	-
PSDI–PRI–PLI	49,270	6.2	-
Radical Party	11,822	1.5	-
Others	5,678	0.7	-
Total	791,220	100.0	9

Source: Ministry of the Interior
