= 2008 Italian general election in Sardinia =

The Italian general election of 2008 took place on 13–14 April 2008.

The People of Freedom was the largest party in Sardinia with 42.4%, while the Democratic Party came second with 36.2%.

== Results ==
=== Chamber of Deputies ===
Coalitions leaders	votes	votes (%)	seats	Parties	votes	votes (%)	seats
Silvio Berlusconi	421,420	43.1	9	The People of Freedom	415,252	42.4	9
Silvio Berlusconi	421,420	43.1	9	Movement for Autonomy	6,168	0.6	-
Walter Veltroni	393,078	40.2	8	Democratic Party	354,212	36.2	7
Walter Veltroni	393,078	40.2	8	Italy of Values	38,866	4.0	1
Pier Ferdinando Casini	54,665	5.6	1	Union of the Centre	54,665	5.6	1
Fausto Bertinotti	35,097	3.6	-	The Left – The Rainbow	35,097	3.6	-
Enrico Boselli	15,202	1.5	-	Socialist Party	15,202	1.5	-
Daniela Santanchè	15,081	1.5	-	The Right–Tricolour Flame	15,081	1.5	-
Giacomo Sanna	14,856	1.5	-	Sardinian Action Party	14,856	1.5	-
Bustianu Cumpostu	7,182	0.7	-	Sardinia Nation	7,182	0.7	-
Others	21,863	1.5	-	Others	21,863	1.5	-
Total coalitions	978,444	100.0	18	Total parties	978,444	100.0	18

Source: Ministry of the Interior

=== Senate ===
Coalitions leaders	votes	votes (%)	seats	Parties	votes	votes (%)	seats
Silvio Berlusconi	390,076	43.7	5	The People of Freedom	384,950	43.2	5
Silvio Berlusconi	390,076	43.7	5	Movement for Autonomy	5,126	0.6	-
Walter Veltroni	360,485	40.4	4	Democratic Party	325,919	36.6	4
Walter Veltroni	360,485	40.4	4	Italy of Values	34,566	3.9	-
Pier Ferdinando Casini	49,624	5.6	-	Union of the Centre	49,624	5.6	-
Fausto Bertinotti	29,628	3.3	-	The Left – The Rainbow	29,628	3.3	-
Giacomo Sanna	15,280	1.7	-	Sardinian Action Party	15,280	1.7	-
Enrico Boselli	12,728	1.4	-	Socialist Party	12,728	1.4	-
Daniela Santanchè	11,073	1.2	-	The Right–Tricolour Flame	11,073	1.2	-
Bustianu Cumpostu	6,972	0.8	-	Sardinia Nation	6,972	0.8	-
Others	15,855	1.8	-	Others	18,855	1.8	-
Total coalitions	891,721	100.0	9	Total parties	891,721	100.0	9

Source: Ministry of the Interior
