= 1987 Italian general election in Sardinia =

The Italian general election of 1987 took place on 14 June 1987.

Christian Democracy was by far the largest party in Sardinia. The Sardinian Action Party had its best result in a general election, gaining two deputies and one senator.

== Results ==
=== Chamber of Deputies ===
Parties	votes	votes (%)	seats
Christian Democracy	354,312	34.3	7
Italian Communist Party	262,170	25.3	5
Sardinian Action Party	123,678	12.0	2
Italian Socialist Party	118,329	11.4	2
Italian Social Movement	48,551	4.7	1
Italian Democratic Socialist Party	32,017	3.1	1
Radical Party	27,091	2.6	-
Italian Republican Party	23,505	2.3	-
Proletarian Democracy	13,148	1.3	-
Federation of Green Lists	10,269	1.0	-
Italian Liberal Party	9,791	1.0	-
Others	11,617	1.1	-
Total	1,034,478	100.0	18

Source: Ministry of the Interior

=== Senate ===
Parties	votes	votes (%)	seats
Christian Democracy	304,956	36.3	4
Italian Communist Party	236,678	28.2	3
Sardinian Action Party	118,589	14.1	1
Italian Socialist Party–PSDI–PR–PRI–PLI	84,883	10.1	1
Italian Social Movement	50,778	6.1	-
Proletarian Democracy	12,863	1.5	-
Independentist Sardinian Party	11,818	1.4	-
Federation of Green Lists	10,265	1.2	-
Others	8,569	1.0	-
Total	839,399	100.0	9

Source: Ministry of the Interior
