= Michele Columbu =

Italian politician and writer

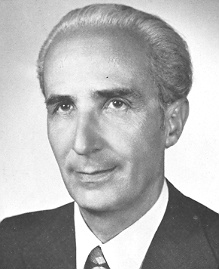
Michele Columbu

Michele Columbu (8 February 1914 – 10 July 2012) was an Italian politician and writer from Ollolai, Sardinia.

For decades, between World War II and the 1970s he was the leader of the Sardinian Action Party (PSd'Az), a Sardinian nationalist party calling for detachment from Italy and fiercely contesting the presence of NATO military bases in Sardinia. He was elected to the European Parliament in 1984.

He wrote a collection of short stories, L'aurora è lontana (1968), and the essay collection Senza un perché.

== Biography ==
In 1948, he was elected councilor of his town, and became mayor in the 1960s. In April 1964, he led the "march on Cagliari", walking 500 km across Sardinia to demand jobs and development for Work (human activity) inland and mountain areas.

From 1972 to 1976, he was an independent legislator elected on the Italian Communist Party list, following an electoral agreement between the PSD'Az and the PCI. He also served as vice-chairman of the Parliamentary Committee on Agriculture and Forestry, representing the mixed group and the autonomous regions of which he was a member. He ran again in the 1976 elections but was not re-elected by a handful of votes. In 1980, he successfully ran for the Cagliari City Council, bringing the Sardinian Action Party to 4.1% of the city's votes. He was mayor of the Sardinian capital from 12 to 19 August 1980.

He was elected to the European Parliament in the 1984 elections on the Federalism list, formed by an agreement between the PSd'Az and the Valdostan Union. He was a member of the Committee on Regional Policy and Territorial Planning, the Committee on Institutional Affairs, and the Committee on Environmental Protection, Public Health, and Consumer protection.

In 1984, he also became a regional councilor but resigned shortly afterwards due to the incompatibility of this position with that of MEP. He was secretary of the Sardinian Action Party from 1974 to 1979 and then president from 1979 until 1991, when he retired from politics for reasons of age and health.

He also wrote numerous political essays and a collection of short stories entitled "L'aurora è lontana" (The Dawn is Far Away). He died on the night of 10 July 2012, at the age of 98.
