= Future Left =

Future Left may refer to:

- Future Left (Sweden), a political party in Sweden
- Future Left (Sardinia), a political party in Sardinia, Italy
