= Pietro Soddu =

Italian politician (1929–2026)

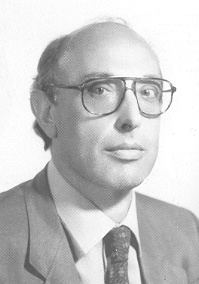
Pietro Soddu

Pietro Soddu (19 June 1929 – 16 September 2026) was an Italian politician who was the President of Sardinia in 1972, again from 1976 to 1979, and finally in 1980. He served in the Chamber of Deputies for Legislature IX of Italy (1983–1987), Legislature X of Italy (1987–1992) and Legislature XI of Italy (1992–1994) as a member of Christian Democracy. Soddu was later President of the Province of Sassari (1995–2000) as a member of the Italian People's Party.

Soddu died on 16 September 2026, at the age of 97.

Preceded by Antonio Giagu De Martini	President of Sardinia; 1972	Succeeded by Salvator Angelo Spano
Preceded by Giovanni Del Rio	President of Sardinia; 1976–1979	Succeeded by Mario Puddu
Preceded by Alessandro Ghinami	President of Sardinia; 1980	Succeeded by Mario Puddu
