= Sardinia Alliance =

Sardinian political party

Sardinia Alliance Alleanza Sardegna
- Leader: Gerolamo Solina
- Founded: 2023
- Ideology: Regionalism; Liberal conservatism
- Political position: Centre-right
- Regional affiliation: Centre-right coalition
- Regional Council of Sardinia: 1 / 60

Sardinia Alliance (Italian: Alleanza Sardegna, AS) is a regionalist, Sardinian nationalist and liberal political party in Sardinia, led by Gerolamo Solina.

== History ==
The party was formed in the run-up of the 2024 regional election by a group of splinters from the Sardinian Action Party, including regional councillors Franco Mula, Giovanni Satta and Stefano Schirru, who were joined by Pietro Moro, elected with Sardinia 20Twenty and later aligned with the Union of the Centre.

In November 2024, the party's four regional councillors were founding members of a group in the Regional Council of Sardinia named "The Great Centre" (GC), along with Antonello Peru of Sardinia/Italy in the Centre (who was a splinter from Forza Italia and was selected to chair the group), Dino Cocco of Sardinia 20Twenty, Valerio De Giorgi of Christian Democracy with Rotondi (elected with Fortza Paris) and Francesco Stara of Action (elected with the centre-left coalition).

In the regional election, AS formed a joint list with the Italian Liberal Party, obtaining 4.1% of the vote and two regional councillors, Mula and Schirru. The other list emerged from the GC group, formed by Sardinia 20Twenty and Sardinia in the Centre, obtained 5.5% of the vote and three regional councillors, including Peru.

In February 2025 Mula left AS in order to join Brothers of Italy.

== Election results ==
=== Regional elections ===
Election	Votes	%	Seats	+/–
2024	28,203	4.1	2 / 60	New

== Leadership ==
- Secretary: Gerolamo Solina (2023–present)
