= 1979 European Parliament election in Sardinia =

The European Parliament election of 1979 took place on 10 June 1979.

Christian Democracy received the highest vote share in Sardinia, with 39.4%. This was followed by the Italian Communist Party with 32.7%.

== Results ==
Parties	votes	votes (%)
Christian Democracy	341,776	39.4
Italian Communist Party	283,396	32.7
Italian Socialist Party	70,524	8.1
Italian Social Movement	54,169	6.3
Radical Party	39,516	4.6
Italian Democratic Socialist Party	25,125	2.9
Italian Liberal Party	15,294	1.8
Italian Republican Party	12,052	1.4
Others	24,725	2.9
Total	866,577	100.0

Source: Ministry of the Interior

== See also ==
- 1979 European Parliament election in Italy
