= 1953 Sardinian regional election =

The Sardinian regional election of 1953 for the Second Council took place on 14 June 1953.

Five more seats were added.

After the election Luigi Crespellani, the incumbent Christian Democratic President, was re-elected President by the Regional Council. He was later succeeded by Alfredo Corrias (1954–1955) and Giuseppe Brotzu (1955–1957).

== Results ==
Parties	votes	votes (%)	seats
Christian Democracy	254,619	41.0	30
Italian Communist Party	138,134	22.3	15
Italian Socialist Party	54,565	8.8	5
Monarchist National Party	53,352	8.6	5
Italian Social Movement	47,898	7.7	4
Sardinian Action Party	43,215	7.0	4
Italian Liberal Party	14,141	2.2	1
Italian Democratic Socialist Party	13,040	2.2	1
Others	1,303	0.2	-
Total	620,262	100.0	65

Sources: Regional Council of Sardinia and Istituto Cattaneo
