= 1999 Sardinian regional election =

- 13 and 27 June 1999

All 80 seats to the Regional Council of Sardinia
- Turnout: 66.3% (▼8.0%)
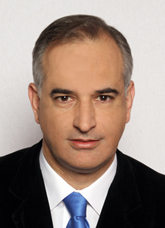

| | Majority party | Minority party |
|---|---|---|
| Candidate | Mauro Pili | Gian Mario Selis |
| Party | Forza Italia | PPI |
| Alliance | Pole for Freedoms | The Olive Tree |
| Seats won | 37 | 37 |
| Seat change | ▲9 | ▼5 |
| Popular vote | 369,164 | 318,122 |
| Percentage | 53.7% | 46.3% |
| Swing | ▲17.0% | ▼7.1% |
President before election
Federico Palomba
PDS
Elected President
Mauro Pili
Forza Italia

The Sardinian regional election of 1999 took place on 13 and 27 June 1999.

The centre-right coalition led by Mauro Pili won the election but was short of a clear majority; Pili, who was appointed President of the Region, could not form a majority and was soon replaced by the defeated candidate, Gian Mario Selis, who likewise lost a confidence vote of the Regional Council. The former President Mario Floris was asked to form a government avoiding a new regional election.

== Results ==
Regional council election

Summary of the 1999 Sardinia Regional Council election results
| Parties and coalitions | | Votes | % | Seats |
|---|---|---|---|---|
| Democrats of the Left (Democratici di Sinistra) | DS | 122,675 | 14.2 | 10 |
| Italian People's Party (Partito Popolare Italiano) | PPI | 87,566 | 10.2 | 7 |
| Democratic Federation (Federazione Democratica) | FD | 49,584 | 5.8 | 4 |
| The Democrats (I Democratici) | Dem | 46,857 | 5.8 | 4 |
| Italian Democratic Socialists (Socialisti Democratici Italiani) | SDI | 43,250 | 5.0 | 3 |
| Communist Refoundation Party (Rifondazione Comunista) | PRC | 31,713 | 3.7 | 2 |
| Party of Italian Communists (Comunisti Italiani) | PdCI | 18,257 | 2.1 | 0 |
| The Greens (I Verdi) | FdV | 15,833 | 1.8 | 0 |
| The Olive Tree (Selis) | | 415,735 | 48.6 | 30 |
| Forza Italia | FI | 169,470 | 19.7 | 13 |
| National Alliance (Alleanza Nazionale) | AN | 85,201 | 9.9 | 7 |
| Sardinian Reformers (Riformisti Sardi) | RS | 38,259 | 4.4 | 3 |
| Christian Democratic Centre (Centro Cristiano Democratico) | CCD | 34,866 | 4.0 | 3 |
| New Movement (Nuovo Movimento) | NM | 28,771 | 3.3 | 2 |
| Pole for Freedoms (Pili) | | 356,567 | 41.3 | 28 |
| Sardinian Action Party (Partito Sardo d'Azione) | PSdAz | 38,422 | 4.5 | 3 |
| Democratic Union for the Republic (Unione Democratica per la Repubblica) | UDR | 35,177 | 4.1 | 3 |
| Sardinia Nation (Sardigna Natzione) | SN | 15,283 | 1.8 | 0 |
| Total | | 861,184 | 100.00 | 64 |
| Turnout | | | 66.3 | |
Source: Regional Council of Sardinia

President election

| Candidate | Party | Coalition | First round | | Second round | | Regional seats |
| Candidate | Party | Coalition | Votes | % | Votes | % | Regional seats |
|---|---|---|---|---|---|---|---|
| Mauro Pili | FI | Pole for Freedoms | 371,816 | 48.1 | 369,164 | 53.7 | 9 |
| Gian Mario Selis | PPI | The Olive Tree | 243,839 | 31.5 | 318,122 | 46.3 | 7 |
| Franco Meloni | PS'dAz | | 64,420 | 8.3 | | | |
| Mario Floris | UDR | | 47,697 | 6.2 | | | |
| Bustiano Cumpostu | SN | | 46,014 | 5.9 | | | |
| Total votes | | | 772,979 | 100.00 | 687,286 | 100.00 | 16 |
