= Alfredo Corrias =

Italian lawyer and politician

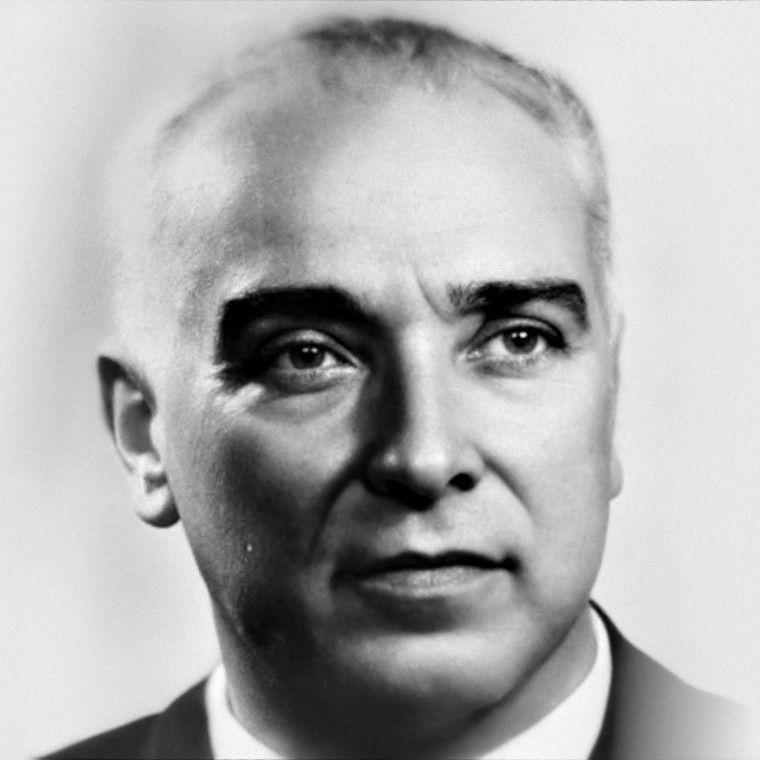
Alfredo Corrias

Alfreo Corrias (November 3, 1895 – May 2, 1985) was an Italian lawyer and 20th-century politician. He was Mayor of Oristano (1946–1949) and President of Sardinia (1954–1955). He was a member of Christian Democracy.

Preceded by Luigi Crespellani	President of Sardinia; 1954–1955	Succeeded by Giuseppe Brotzu
