= Future Left (Sardinia) =

Sardinian political party

Future Left Sinistra Futura
- Leader: Luca Pizzuto
- Founded: March 2023
- Split from: Article One; Italian Left
- Ideology: Democratic socialism Regionalism
- Political position: Left-wing
- Sardinian Regional Council: 3 / 60

Website
- www.sinistrafutura.it

Future Left (Italian: Sinistra Futura, SF) is a regionalist and democratic-socialist political party in Sardinia, led by Luca Pizzuto.

== History ==
The party was formed in March 2023 by members of Article One (Art.1) and Italian Left (SI). Its creation followed the decision of Article One to merge into the Democratic Party (PD) in June 2023, with the aim of providing a new political home for the progressive left in the Sardinia region.

Ahead of the 2024 Sardinian regional election, Future Left was among the earliest supporters of Alessandra Todde of the Five Star Movement (M5S) as the joint candidate of the centre-left coalition for President of Sardinia. In the 2024 regional election, Todde was narrowly elected president and SF won 3.0% of the vote and three regional councillors — Giuseppino Canu, Paola Casula and Luca Pizzuto (while Italian Left, in list with Green Europe within Greens and Left Alliance, won 4.7% of the vote and four seats). After the election, Ilaria Portas of SF was appointed regional minister of Education, Cultural Heritage, Information, Entertainment and Sports.

In 2025, Future Left began a process of organisational consolidation aimed at transforming itself into a fully structured political party. As part of this process, the party convened a regional assembly in July to approve its new organisational framework and strengthen its presence throughout Sardinia.

== Election results ==
=== Regional elections ===
Election	Votes	%	Seats	+/–
2024	20,574	3.0	3 / 60	New

== Leadership ==
- President: Luca Pizzuto (2023–present)
- Vice President: Paola Casula (2023–present)
