= 1974 Sardinian regional election =

The Sardinian regional election of 1974 took place on 16 June 1974.

One more seat was added.

After the election Giovanni Del Rio, a Christian Democrat, formed a government with the Italian Socialist Party and the Italian Democratic Socialist Party. In 1976 Del Rio was replaced by fellow Christian Democrat Pietro Soddu and the Socialists eventually left the government in 1978.

== Results ==
Parties	votes	votes (%)	seats
Christian Democracy	305,071	38.3	32
Italian Communist Party	213,300	26.8	22
Italian Socialist Party	93,007	11.7	9
Italian Social Movement	62,294	7.8	6
Italian Democratic Socialist Party	49,906	5.9	3
Sardinian Action Party	24,780	3.1	1
Italian Liberal Party	22,159	2.8	1
Italian Republican Party	20,570	2.6	1
Communist Party of Italy (Marxist-Leninist)	7,717	1.0	-
Total	795,804	100.0	75

Sources: Regional Council of Sardinia and Istituto Cattaneo
