= Alessandro Ghinami =

Italian politician (1923–2016)

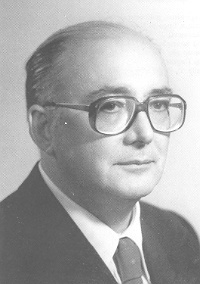

President of Sardinia
- In office 26 September 1979 – 18 September 1980
- Preceded by: Mario Puddu
- Succeeded by: Pietro Soddu

Personal details
- Born: 19 May 1923 Oristano, Sardinia, Italy
- Died: 8 January 2016 (aged 92) Ghilarza, Province of Oristano, Sardinia, Italy
- Party: Italian Democratic Socialist Party

Alessandro Ghinami (19 May 1923 – 8 January 2016) was an Italian civil servant and politician from Sardinia. He served as the President of Sardinia from 1979 to 1980.

== Biography ==
Ghinami was the prominent politician of the Social Democrats; he was President of the Regional Council, President of the Region of Sardinia for a year and a deputy in the X and XI legislature. He has held positions on numerous committees and was under secretary in the governments Goria, De Mita, Andreotti VI, and VII.
