= 1969 Sardinian regional election =

The Sardinian regional election of 1969 took place on 15 June 1969.

Two more seats were added.

The legislature term rose to five years.

After the election Giovanni Del Rio, the incumbent Christian Democratic President, formed a new government that lasted only some months and was succeeded by a succession of governments that sometimes included the Italian Socialist Party, the Sardinian Action Party and the Italian Democratic Socialist Party.

== Results ==
Parties	votes	votes (%)	seats
Christian Democracy	329,835	44.6	36
Italian Communist Party	146,155	19.8	15
Italian Socialist Party – Italian Democratic Socialist Party	87,650	11.9	9
Italian Liberal Party	33,484	4.5	3
Italian Socialist Party of Proletarian Unity	32,810	4.4	3
Sardinian Action Party	32,395	4.4	3
Italian Social Movement	26,671	3.6	2
Italian Democratic Party of Monarchist Unity	22,620	3.1	2
Italian Republican Party – Autonomist Sardist Movement	22,187	3.0	1
Others	5,845	0.7	-
Total	740,477	100.0	74

Sources: Regional Council of Sardinia and Istituto Cattaneo
