= 1957 Sardinian regional election =

The Sardinian regional election of 1957 took place on 16 June 1957.

Five more seats were added.

After the election Giuseppe Brotzu, the incumbent Christian Democratic President, was re-elected President by the Regional Council. However, as soon as in 1958 Efisio Corrias replaced him at the head of a new government that included the Sardinian Action Party, a social-liberal regionalist party.

== Results ==
Parties	votes	votes (%)	seats
Christian Democracy	278,304	41.7	31
Italian Communist Party	116,997	17.6	13
Italian Socialist Party	63,524	9.5	6
People's Monarchist Party	60,006	9.0	6
Sardinian Action Party	40,214	6.0	5
Monarchist National Party	38,867	5.8	4
Italian Social Movement	33,628	5.0	3
Italian Democratic Socialist Party	18,162	2.7	1
Italian Liberal Party	18,129	2.7	1
Total	667,831	100.0	70

Sources: Regional Council of Sardinia and Istituto Cattaneo
