= 1949 Sardinian regional election =

The Sardinian regional election of 1949 took place on 8 May 1949. The Italian Constitution of 1948 granted a special autonomy to Sardinia.

After the election Luigi Crespellani, a Christian Democrat, formed a government with the Sardinian Action Party, a social-liberal regionalist party, that eventually quit the government in 1951.

== Results ==
Parties	votes	votes (%)	seats
Christian Democracy	196,918	34.0	22
Italian Communist Party	112,311	19.4	13
Monarchist National Party	67,141	11.6	7
Sardinian Action Party	60,525	10.4	7
Sardinian Socialist Action Party	38,081	6.6	3
Italian Social Movement	35,402	6.1	3
Italian Socialist Party	34,858	6.0	3
Italian Workers' Socialist Party	16,829	2.9	1
Italian Liberal Party	11,775	2.0	1
Common Man's Front	4,838	0.9	-
Others	707	0.1	-
Total	579,385	100.0	60

Sources: Regional Council of Sardinia and Istituto Cattaneo
