= 1989 Sardinian regional election =

The Sardinian regional election of 1989 took place on 11 June 1989.

One seat was canceled.

After the election a centre-left government composed of Christian Democracy, the Italian Socialist Party and the Italian Democratic Socialist Party was formed. The position of President of the Region was held by Mario Floris (1989–1991) and Antonello Cabras (1991–1994).

== Results ==
Parties	votes	votes (%)	seats
Christian Democracy	361,116	35.0	29
Italian Communist Party	239,202	23.2	19
Italian Socialist Party	144,505	14.0	12
Sardinian Action Party	127,765	12.5	10
Italian Democratic Socialist Party	47,735	4.6	4
Italian Republican Party – Italian Liberal Party	40,400	3.9	3
Italian Social Movement	36,583	3.5	3
Green List	18,634	1.8	-
Others	16,343	1.6	-
Total	1,032,583	100.0	80

Sources: Regional Council of Sardinia and Istituto Cattaneo
