= 1984 Sardinian regional election =

The Sardinian regional election of 1984 took place on 24 June 1984.

One more seat was added.

After the election Mario Melis, leader of the Sardinian Action Party, a nationalist social-liberal outfit, formed a government with the support of the Italian Communist Party, the Italian Socialist Party and, since 1985, the Italian Democratic Socialist Party.

== Results ==
| Parties | votes | votes (%) | seats |
|---|---|---|---|
| Christian Democracy | 319,980 | 32.2 | 27 |
| Italian Communist Party | 285,387 | 28.7 | 24 |
| Sardinian Action Party | 136,720 | 13.8 | 12 |
| Italian Socialist Party | 100,435 | 10.1 | 8 |
| Italian Democratic Socialist Party | 43,046 | 4.3 | 4 |
| Italian Republican Party–Italian Liberal Party | 39,046 | 4.0 | 3 |
| Italian Social Movement | 39,091 | 3.9 | 3 |
| Radical Party | 14,244 | 1.4 | - |
| Proletarian Democracy | 9,348 | 0.9 | - |
| Others | 6,279 | 0.6 | - |
| Total | 994,020 | 100.0 | 81 |

Sources: Regional Council of Sardinia and Istituto Cattaneo
