= 1979 Sardinian regional election =

The Sardinian regional election of 1979 took place on 17 June 1979.

After the election Alessandro Ghinami, member of the Italian Democratic Socialist Party formed a government which included Christian Democracy and the Italian Socialist Party. However, as soon as in 1980 the Socialists and the Democratic Socialists switched sides and formed a new coalition with the Italian Communist Party and the Sardinian Action Party. The government was led by Socialist Francesco Rais (1980–1982) and Sardist Mario Melis (1982). In 1982 the Christian Democrats returned at the head of the regional government with Angelo Rojch as President, in coalition with the Socialists, the Democratic Socialists and the Italian Republican Party.

== Results ==
Parties	votes	votes (%)	seats
Christian Democracy	343,208	37.7	32
Italian Communist Party	238,881	26.3	22
Italian Socialist Party	101,429	11.2	9
Italian Social Movement	48,695	5.4	4
Italian Democratic Socialist Party	42,304	4.7	4
Sardinian Action Party	30,238	3.3	3
Italian Republican Party	29,701	3.3	3
Radical Party	28,059	3.1	2
Italian Liberal Party	18,073	2.0	1
National Democracy	9,199	1.0	-
Proletarian Unity Party	8,589	0.9	-
Others	10,999	1.3	-
Total	909,375	100.0	80

Sources: Regional Council of Sardinia and Istituto Cattaneo
