= 1965 Sardinian regional election =

The Sardinian regional election of 1965 took place on 13 June 1965.

After the election Efisio Corrias, the incumbent Christian Democratic President, formed a new government that included the Italian Socialist Party and the Sardinian Action Party. Corrias was replaced as President of the Region by Paolo Dettori, to whom Giovanni Del Rio succeeded in 1967. Contemporaneously the Sardists left the government.

== Results ==
| Parties | votes | votes (%) | seats |
|---|---|---|---|
| Christian Democracy | 303,654 | 43.4 | 35 |
| Italian Communist Party | 143,395 | 20.5 | 15 |
| Italian Socialist Party | 48,278 | 6.9 | 5 |
| Sardinian Action Party–Italian Republican Party | 44,621 | 6.4 | 5 |
| Italian Liberal Party | 42,990 | 6.1 | 3 |
| Italian Democratic Socialist Party | 37,935 | 5.4 | 3 |
| Italian Social Movement | 31,858 | 4.6 | 3 |
| Italian Socialist Party of Proletarian Unity | 26,295 | 2.8 | 1 |
| Italian Democratic Party of Monarchist Unity | 20,463 | 2.9 | 2 |
| Total | 699,489 | 100.0 | 72 |

Sources: Regional Council of Sardinia and Istituto Cattaneo
