= Giuseppe Brotzu =

Italian politician and pharmacologist (1895–1976)

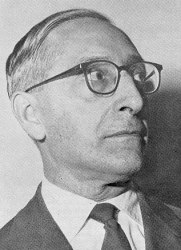
- Giuseppe Brotzu

4th President of the Autonomous Region of Sardinia
- In office 21 June 1955 – 30 October 1958
- Preceded by: Alfredo Corrias
- Succeeded by: Efisio Corrias

Mayor of Cagliari
- In office 29 December 1960 – 19 July 1967
- Preceded by: Giuseppe Peretti
- Succeeded by: Paolo De Magistris

Personal details
- Born: 24 January 1895 Cagliari, Kingdom of Italy
- Died: 8 April 1976 (aged 81) Cagliari, Italy
- Party: Christian Democracy
- Spouse: Maria Castellani
- Children: Maria Vittoria, Giovanni, Vittorio and Piero
- Education: University of Cagliari
- Occupation: Physician, microbiologist, university professor
- Profession: Physician

Giuseppe Brotzu (24 January 1895 – 8 April 1976) was an Italian physician, microbiologist and politician, internationally recognised for his fundamental contributions to the discovery of cephalosporins.

== Biography ==
"A temperate and wise man, with an ever-balanced spirit, truthful, cultured, kind and modest" was how his pupil and friend Antonio Spanedda described him.

=== Early life and education ===
Giuseppe Brotzu was born in Cagliari to Luigi Brotzu and Maria Castangia, into a middle-class family of physicians: he was the third doctor in the household, after his father, a health officer in the municipality of Cagliari, and his grandfather, a local physician in Ghilarza.

He graduated in medicine from the University of Cagliari in 1919 and was exempted from military service in order to take charge of the antimalarial clinics of Cagliari. After several years in clinical practice, he began attending the Institute of Hygiene, where, working alongside Professor Donato Ottolenghi, a distinguished scholar of hygiene, he developed an interest in the field and followed him first to Siena and later to Bologna.

In Siena he met Maria Castellani, a young chemist working as a pharmacist at the Siena hospital. They studied regularly together, and she nursed him through an illness with Maltese fever; they married in 1926. Although he obtained the chair of microbiology at the Institute of Hygiene in Modena in 1932, his attachment to his homeland and home city led him to return to Cagliari in 1933, and in 1934 he was placed in charge of the city's Institute of Hygiene. He served as dean of the Faculty of Pharmacy in the academic year 1934–1935, of the Faculty of Medicine in 1935–1936, and subsequently as rector of the University from 1936 to 1945, years during which the Faculties of Mining Engineering and of Education were established. After seven years of waiting, his daughter Maria Vittoria was born in 1933 but fell ill at the end of that year; Giovanni was born the following year, followed by three more children.

=== Academic, civic and political career ===
In 1945, after years of study and research, Brotzu arrived at the discovery of cephalosporins. In that same year, he was suspended from service for having collaborated, as rector of the University, with the Fascist regime, including the period after 8 September 1943. The suspension was later fully annulled.

In parallel to his academic career, he pursued a political career: he served as Regional Councillor for Hygiene and Health (1949–1955) and as President of the Region from 1955 to 1958. Finally, from 29 December 1960 to 19 July 1967, he was Mayor of Cagliari.

A devout Catholic and representative of Christian Democracy, he managed for several years the Catholic newspaper Quotidiano Sardo, first published in Oristano in 1947 and later transferred to Cagliari, a contemporary of L'Unione Sarda and La Nuova Sardegna. Despite Brotzu's considerable personal sacrifices, the paper lost momentum within a decade. Consistently engaged in social causes, he took a decisive role in the Rockefeller Foundation campaign against malaria, demonstrating "a humanitarian, as well as scientific, interest in the problem".

According to a British scholar, citing Italian studies, Brotzu had a local reputation as a "wizard" (jettatore), owing to his habit of always dressing in black despite the high average temperatures of Cagliari.

=== Final years ===
Having retired from teaching in 1965 owing to the age limit, he continued to frequent the Institute of Hygiene until he was over eighty, when he suffered a stroke that, while leaving his mental faculties fully intact, gravely impaired him physically. He died in Cagliari on 8 April 1976.

The largest and most important hospital complex in Cagliari and Sardinia, the "Ospedale G. Brotzu", is named in his honour.

== Family ==
In 1926, Giuseppe Brotzu married Maria Castellani, a chemist. The couple had four children: Maria Vittoria, Giovanni, Vittorio, and Piero. Their son, Giovanni Brotzu, continued the scientific dynasty — he became a professor and a distinguished surgeon, specializing in six fields of medicine (general, vascular, thoracic, cardiac, urological, and sports surgery). Giovanni had a son, named Giuseppe Brotzu (b. 1963) after his famous grandfather, the discoverer. The younger Giuseppe also dedicated himself to research, becoming a creator and inventor.

== Scientific research ==
=== Early investigations ===
Brotzu began his research into cephalosporins with careful observation of the waters of the port of Cagliari, which were then heavily polluted but in which no proliferation of microorganisms or bacteria was visible, despite their certain presence. He asked himself what was in those waters that might prevent such growth.

Furthermore, many young people bathed daily in the port waters — where the city's sewage discharged into the sea — and yet no salmonellosis, typhoid fever or paratyphoid epidemics occurred. Spanedda himself, his loyal collaborator, annually renewed on 19 March (the Feast of Saint Joseph) the tradition of bathing in the port waters without contracting any serious disease or infection.

The hypothesis was raised that, given the dire sanitary conditions but the few cases of infection, the Sardinians, and in particular the inhabitants of Cagliari, possessed some immunological peculiarity. While for many scholars this constituted an inexplicable but accepted fact, for Brotzu it was clear evidence of the presence in those waters of an immunising agent — a belief supported by the fact that hygiene problems are linked to microbiological factors.

Between 1920 and 1922, Brotzu, then in his mid-twenties, director of the city's antimalarial clinics and voluntary assistant at the Institute of Hygiene, decided to investigate the problem in depth. Suspecting that an infection known as "infezione eberthiana" was widespread in Cagliari, diagnosed at the time as a simple intestinal infection or paratyphoid, he conducted a series of investigations and laboratory analyses on patients of the antimalarial clinics presenting specific symptoms (headache, abdominal pain, fever, coated tongue and enlarged spleen). Over the period 1921–1922 he examined 38 cases of "patients with febrile forms and even mildly suspicious symptoms"; twenty-five of these proved to be cases of Eberthian infection.

The young physician demonstrated the presence of an endemic typhoid in the city, although in a mild form, whose contagion was linked to marine pollution. He worked to have fishing prohibited in the contaminated zones and to ensure the waters were cleaned. However, having confirmed the presence of an endemic disease in Cagliari, it remained to explain its mild form, and why — given that typhoid existed in an attenuated form — no serious epidemics had ever occurred as in most other Italian cities. Brotzu and his collaborator Spanedda, "researchers even in wartime", began collecting water samples from the eastern area of the commercial gulf of Cagliari, known as "Su Siccu", in search of "bacterial antagonisms".

=== A hypothesis to be discarded ===
The professor's initial thesis, in the mid-1930s, followed Arkwright's theory of "bacterial dissociation", according to which bacterial colonies, under certain unfavourable environmental conditions, could lose specific characteristics or even become similar to other bacteria.

In this specific case, the environmental condition (the seawater) might have determined the loss of certain paradigmatic characteristics of the bacterium, transforming the pathogen; only thus could the partial contamination be explained.

=== Decisive analyses ===
Once the samples had been collected from the polluted shores, carefully placed in flasks by the professor himself, the fungi they contained were "seeded on common agar and left to develop at room temperature". "Once fully developed, the colonies of numerous germs were isolated and the antagonistic power of each tested" against various bacteria responsible for infections. "By following this very simple technique, it was possible to study hundreds of germs and to choose among them the fungus that, from the very first isolations, proved to possess particular and marked inhibitory activities".

On 20 July 1945, Brotzu and Spanedda were able to observe "the ochre-coloured colony with rosy tones that inhibited various microorganisms, including Salmonella typhi". After many further cultures, the professor obtained confirmation: "it is, therefore, a fungus belonging to the sporophores and, among these, to the genus Cephalosporium"; "The species isolated by us is probably the type species, namely acremonium".

In 1945 the so-called "Brotzu mycetin" was isolated — it was later discovered that the substance was composed of three antibiotics, cephalosporins N, P and C — with which the professor and his collaborator experimented on themselves, first intracutaneously and then subcutaneously, to test efficacy and toxicity. No local reactions or systemic disturbances occurred: the antibiotic was therefore not harmful.

=== Brilliant but isolated ===
Brotzu maintained that "the exclusivity of a possible medicine belongs only to God, and man is merely an instrument of Providence". He submitted requests for funding and equipment to the Ministry of Education, the Ministry of Health and the CNR, but was wholly ignored. He therefore responded to a direct request by sending a culture of the fungus to Sir Howard Florey, of the University of Oxford — the researcher who, with Ernst Chain, had produced penicillin, discovered by Alexander Fleming. Florey forwarded the samples to the well-known biologist Edward Abraham, who, between 1951 and 1961, extracted, purified and studied various substances with antibiotic activity. Among these, cephalosporin C, which became the precursor of a new generation of antibiotics, was isolated by Norman Heatley.

Abraham ultimately purified the active principle. Scientific authorship of the antibiotic was recognised by the international scientific community only in the early 1970s.

== Social commitment ==
"The commitment to the fight against the oldest and most insidious disease in the history of Sardinia — malaria — runs through Giuseppe Brotzu's entire scientific, academic and political-institutional life".

His civic commitment was no less significant in the difficult post-war years and during reconstruction, when he was entrusted with the offices of Regional Superintendent of Health and President of the United Hospitals of Cagliari. Even before the large-scale use of DDT became widespread, Brotzu sought to combat the two-thousand-year-old scourge of malaria — "the intimate cause of the deathly silence that oppressed the island for so many centuries" and "the gag that prevented its evolution" — despite limited means, such as hydraulic and agricultural reclamation, the mosquitofish (larvae-eating fish), and other biological control agents imported by Mussolini, including American bats that fed exclusively on mosquitoes.

The professor witnessed the founding of ERLAAS (Regional Anti-Anopheles Agency in Sardinia), of whose Advisory Board he was a member in 1948. Its aim was to interrupt the chain of contagion and epidemiological transmission of Plasmodium falciparum by eradicating the vector Anopheles maculipennis labranchiae from its breeding grounds. He also collaborated with the Rockefeller Foundation (a philanthropic organisation founded with similar goals in 1913) on the success of a "Renaissance Plan", drawn up in 1951, given the excellent results achieved in the United States and other countries. The Commission continued its work until 1959 but largely neglected its principal tasks owing to lack of resources and funds; it thus assumed a mere social first-aid function, useful only to the ordinary regional budget.

Brotzu worked to ensure that the fight against malaria continued even after the failed intervention of the foundation, which had begun in 1946, especially in the area of present-day Carbonia, in order to begin restoring that "sick" island. He did so first as Councillor for Hygiene, Health and Public Education (1949–1955) and then as President of the Region, through Regional Law No. 25 of 28 November 1957. Once malaria had been defeated, by around the early 1950s, while serving as Councillor for Hygiene and Health, Brotzu finally supported the establishment of the CRAAI (Regional Anti-Malaria and Anti-Insect Centre) to consolidate the results achieved through small- and medium-scale land reclamation works, the construction of hospitals, medical clinics, slaughterhouses and aqueducts for the supply of drinking water.

== Political career ==
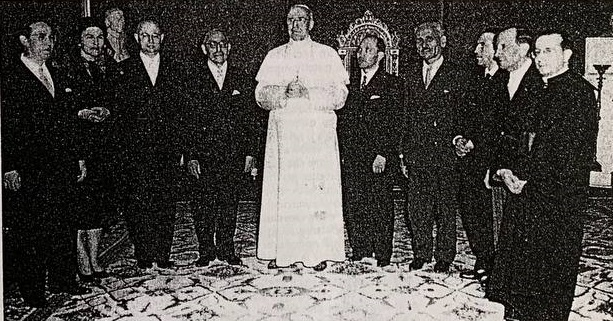
The Regional Council of Sardinia in audience with Pope Pius XII. Brotzu, President of the Regional Council, stands to the right of the pontiff.

In early 1947, Brotzu moved to the first general-use experimentation: he treated cases of patients gravely ill with typhoid, hospitalised at the San Giovanni di Dio Hospital in Cagliari, who were cured following intravenous, intramuscular or rectal administration of the antibiotic. "The general condition of a patient generally benefits from considerable improvement […] already after the first two or three inoculations, the material collected proved to be bacteriologically sterile".

Although he considered himself "not a politician, but a technician — or rather, a scientist on loan to politics", Professor Brotzu was elected to the first Regional Council of Sardinia for Christian Democracy, during the difficult legislatures in which the autonomy of the Region of Sardinia and the regional authority were still emerging.

"The man possessed critical abilities, attention to detail and freedom of judgement that were truly uncommon and invaluable in the role of public administrator". From 1949 to 1955 he held the office of Regional Councillor for Hygiene, Health and Public Education in the Crespellani and Corrias governments, and subsequently, from 21 July 1955 to 30 October 1958, was President of the Region in two single-party Christian Democracy governments. During those years he implemented a Renaissance Plan that included the planning and construction of a series of works: medical clinics, hospitals and slaughterhouses, to consolidate the fight against malaria and combat social diseases. "Attention to the problem of malaria never diminished, despite the commitments".

Recognising the region's major shortcomings in construction and health facilities, he drew up a plan for municipal medical clinics to improve the working conditions of physicians. He valued the island's thermal resources, designing and building the Fordongianus spa and involving not only the Department of Hygiene and Health but also those of Public Works, Agriculture, Transport and Tourism. He was interested in implementing a modern network of hospital buildings, based on Swiss and German models. The hospitals (conceived as clinics with attached wards) of Bosa, Sorgono, Muravera, Olbia, Tempio, San Gavino Monreale, La Maddalena and the CTO of Iglesias are owed to his planning.

He was finally Mayor of Cagliari from December 1960 to September 1967, as an exponent of Christian Democracy, in years marked by severe housing shortage, employment problems and expectations of private enterprise, followed by the unregulated growth of the urban agglomeration and uncontrolled outflow to the periphery, which he attempted to counter through a modern urban plan, a project for the Cagliari area and the municipalisation of urban transport.

In 1963, the municipal budget showed a 75% increase in effective revenue compared to 1960, allowing immediate interventions in the housing sector and school buildings: the stadium, the municipal theatre, the museum citadel, the Bonaria stairway, the panoramic road of Monte Urpinu, the relocation of the Complementary Railways of Sardinia and of the slaughterhouse away from the city centre were established. In 1962 the master plan came into effect, which managed to sustain the economic and urban growth of the 1960s, characterised by various collaborations between administrations, such as that established between Cagliari and Quartu to coordinate coastal activities, develop resources and manage services. In 1962 the construction plan of Law No. 167 was applied, under which some of the most important districts of Cagliari emerged; in 1967 the provisions of the "bridge law" were applied, concerning the participation of owners of buildable land in the territory.

As mayor, he also committed to environmental restoration and protection, implementing a genuine "environmental policy": the extraction of sand from Poetto beach was prohibited, a sewerage system was created for the entire conurbation, the waters of the gulf were rehabilitated, the urban waste landfills on Giorgino beach and in the Santa Gilla lagoon were eliminated, and protected green spaces were created. Brotzu first worked with three centre administrations and then with one centre-left administration (1960–1964 / 1965–1967).

=== Regional governments of Brotzu ===
==== 13 July 1955 – 15 June 1957 ====
President of the Junta

Giuseppe Brotzu (DC)

Councillors

- Agriculture: Luigi Musio (technical)
- Finance: Salvatore Stara (DC)
- Hygiene and Health: Luigi Diaz (DC)
- Industry, Trade and Renaissance: Gervasio Costa (DC)
- Education, Social Welfare and Charity: Pierina Falchi Delitala (DC)
- Public Works: Agostino Cerioni (DC)
- Labour and Crafts: Francesco Deriu (DC)
- Transport, Roads and Tourism: Antonio Gardu (DC)

==== 27 July 1957 – 30 October 1958 ====
President of the Junta

Giuseppe Brotzu (DC)

Councillors

- Agriculture and Forestry: Ignazio Serra (DC)
- Finance: Salvatore Stara (DC)
- Hygiene and Health: Salvatore Cara (DC)
- Industry, Trade and Renaissance: Gervasio Costa (DC)
- Public Works: Agostino Cerioni (DC)
- Labour, Crafts and Cooperation: Francesco Deriu (DC)
- Public Education, Social Welfare and Charity: Pierina Falchi Delitala (DC)
- Roads, Transport and Tourism: Giovanni Del Rio (DC)

== Honours and distinctions ==
Brotzu received an honorary Doctor of Science degree from the University of Oxford in 1971.

He later received distinctions from Glaxo and the British Council, an honorary doctorate in Pharmacy and Sciences in Milan (an honour conferred simultaneously on Brotzu and Daniel Bovet), and, in 1972, the diploma of the National Research Development Corporation and the Gold Medal for Merit in Public Health.

He was an honorary member of the Italian Society of Experimental Medicine, and in 1978 the Lions Club of Cagliari awarded him the Gold Lion, reserved for distinguished citizens of the city.

On 23 February 1978, a street in the Mulinu Becciu district of Cagliari was named after him.

He was made a Knight of the Civil Order of Savoy on 15 September 1974.

== Quotation ==
Among all the problems, one has had a fundamental importance in the history of Sardinia: malaria. Those who are not Sardinian, and who do not know our people's history well, cannot understand the state of mind and our sensitivity towards the problem of malaria, which oppressed, weakened and subjugated the Sardinian people for more than 2,000 years, imprinting upon them stigmata that perhaps only several generations from now will be erased. […] Keeping the danger of malaria away from our island is, therefore, the first task to be confronted. […] It is fundamental, moreover, to recall that without health there is neither well-being nor wealth in a people.

— Giuseppe Brotzu

== Bibliography ==
- (in English) E.P. Abraham, The Cephalosporin C Group, in Quarterly Reviews, No. 21, 1967.
- (in Italian) Giovanni Bo, "BROTZU, Giuseppe", in Dizionario Biografico degli Italiani, Istituto della Enciclopedia Italiana, Rome, Volume XXXIV, 1987.
- (in Italian) Roberto Paracchini, Il signore delle Cefalosporine. Storia di una scoperta, preface by Alessandro Riva, Demos, Cagliari, 1992, ISBN 88-8467-082-9.
- (in Italian) Lorenzo Del Piano (ed.), Per Giuseppe Brotzu, Della Torre, Cagliari, 1998.
- (in Italian) Giovanni Bo, Un ricordo del prof. Giuseppe Brotzu, in Annali di Igiene, Vol. 11, No. 1, pp. 3–9, January–February 1999, PMID 10208039.
- (in English) Giovanni Bo, Giuseppe Brotzu and the discovery of cephalosporins, in Clinical Microbiology and Infection, Vol. 6, No. 3, pp. 6–9, 2000, PMID 11449655.
- (in Italian) R. Colonna, A. Piscitelli and V. Iadevaia, Una breve storia della farmacologia occidentale, in Farmacia clinica, Vol. 33, No. 2, April–June 2019, pp. 86–106 (particularly p. 99).

== See also ==
- Cephalosporins
- Alberto Missiroli
- Regional Agency for the Control of Anopheles in Sardinia
