= 1994 Sardinian regional election =

- 12 and 26 June 1994

All 80 seats to the Regional Council of Sardinia 41 seats needed for a majority
- Turnout: 74.3%
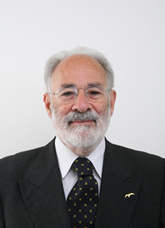

	Majority party	Minority party	Third party
Candidate	Federico Palomba	Ovidio Marras	Gian Mario Selis
Party	PDS	Forza Italia	PPI
Alliance	Progressives	Pole	Centrist coalition
Seats won	29	28	13
Popular vote	289,718	248,145	140,588
Percentage	42.7%	36.7%	20.7%
President before election
Antonello Cabras
PSI
Elected President
Federico Palomba
PDS

The Sardinian regional election of 1994 took place on 12 and 26 June 1994.

The election took place under the provision of a new electoral law, which created a new system under which for the first time ever voters could express an indirect choice for the President through voting the candidate's coalition.

The election was won on the second round by the Progressives' coalition and Federico Palomba (PDS) was elected President of the Region for the 1994–1999 term. Although he did not win a majority of seats in the Regional Council, he was able to form a government with the external support of centrist and regionalist parties.

== New electoral system ==
As had happened for the March 1994 national election, also in Sardinia a new electoral system was introduced. The proportional representation established after the end of World War II had been abolished and a new majoritarian system based on different pre-electoral coalition was introduced.

For the first time ever Sardinians were asked to choice directly the President of the Region. If no candidates received at least 50% of votes, the top three candidates could go to a second round after two weeks. In this case, the candidate who received more votes would have been elected president.

The election of the Regional Council was based on a direct choice for the candidate with a preference vote. Sixty-four councillors were elected in provincial constituencies by proportional representation using the largest remainder method with a Droop quota and open lists; remained seats and votes were grouped at regional level where a Hare quota was used, and then distributed to provincial party lists. Sixteen councillors were instead elected at-large using a general ticket: parties were required to group in alliances, and the alliance which received a plurality of votes elected some candidates, its leader becoming the President of Sardinia. Also in this case, the number of the seats for each party was determined proportionally.

== Results ==
Candidates	I round		II round		Regional seats	Parties	Votes	%	Seats
Candidates	Votes	%	Votes	%	Regional seats	Parties	Votes	%	Seats
Federico Palomba	259.485	29.8	289,718	42.7	8	Democratic Party of the Left	168,062	18.1	13
Federico Palomba	259.485	29.8	289,718	42.7	8	Communist Refoundation Party	55,156	5.6	4
Federico Palomba	259.485	29.8	289,718	42.7	8	Democratic Federation	48,404	5.2	4
Federico Palomba	259.485	29.8	289,718	42.7	8	Democratic Alliance – The Greens	26,969	0.9	–
Federico Palomba	259.485	29.8	289,718	42.7	8	Progressives	274,591	31.8	21
Ovidio Marras	265.131	30.5	248,145	36.7	6	Forza Italia	195,206	21.1	14
Ovidio Marras	265.131	30.5	248,145	36.7	6	National Alliance	102,594	11.1	8
Ovidio Marras	265.131	30.5	248,145	36.7	6	Christian Democratic Centre	14,240	1.5	–
Ovidio Marras	265.131	30.5	248,145	36.7	6	Pole	312,040	33.7	22
Gian Mario Selis	133.286	15.3	140,588	20.7	2	Italian People's Party	149,725	16.2	11
Gian Mario Selis	133.286	15.3	140,588	20.7	2	Italian Republican Party	8,467	0.9	–
Gian Mario Selis	133.286	15.3	140,588	20.7	2	Centrist coalition	158,192	17.1	11
Massimo Fantola	129.761	14.9	-	-	-	Segni Pact	85,721	9.2	6
Pasqualina Crobu	59.277	6.8	-	-	-	Sardinian Action Party	47,000	5.1	4
Gianfranco Pintore	23.368	2.7	-	-	-	Sardinia Nation	10.984	1.2	–
Gianfranco Pintore	23.368	2.7	-	-	-	Sardinian Autonomous Movement	8.106	0.9	–
Gianfranco Pintore	23.368	2.7	-	-	-	Sardinia in Europe	3.526	0.4	–
Gianfranco Pintore	23.368	2.7	-	-	-	Sardinian League	2.041	0.2	–
Gianfranco Pintore	23.368	2.7	-	-	-	League Sardinia	1.092	0.1	–
Gianfranco Pintore	23.368	2.7	-	-	-	SN & allies	25,749	2.8	–
Total	870,308	100	678,451	100	16		926,752	100.00	64
Turnout								74.3	
Source: Regional Council of Sardinia
