= Luigi Crespellani =

Italian lawyer and politician (1897–1967)

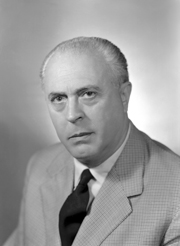
Luigi Crespellani

Luigi Crespellani (February 22, 1897 – April 15, 1967) was an Italian lawyer and politician.

He was a member of Christian Democracy; he served as Mayor of Cagliari from 1946 to 1949 and was defined "Mayor of reconstruction".

On 31 May 1949 he became the first President of Sardinia, a position he held until 7 January 1954. He later headed the Credito Industriale Sardo. He was elected to the Senate of the Republic for two terms and held office from 1958 to 1967, the year of his death.

== Honours and awards ==
- Italy: Knight of the Order of Merit of the Italian Republic
