= 1961 Sardinian regional election =

The Sardinian regional election of 1961 took place on 18 June 1961.

Two more seats were added.

After the election Efisio Corrias, the incumbent Christian Democratic President, formed a new government that included the Sardinian Action Party, a social-liberal regionalist party. In 1963 the government was enlarged to the Italian Democratic Socialist Party.

== Results ==
Parties	votes	votes (%)	seats
Christian Democracy	320,756	46.4	37
Italian Communist Party	131,622	19.0	14
Italian Socialist Party	66,523	9.6	7
Sardinian Action Party–Italian Republican Party	50,039	7.2	5
Italian Social Movement	42,145	6.1	4
Italian Democratic Party of Monarchist Unity	33,985	4.9	2
Italian Liberal Party	23,011	3.3	1
Italian Democratic Socialist Party	21,736	3.1	2
Others	2,490	0.4	-
Total	692,307	100.0	72

Sources: Regional Council of Sardinia and Istituto Cattaneo
