= Giovanni Del Rio =

Italian politician (1925–2014)

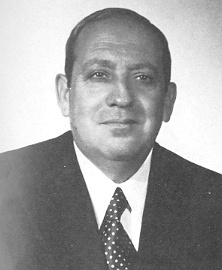
- Born: 12 May 1925; Sindia, Sardinia, Italy
- Died: 31 December 2014 (aged 89); Sindia, Sardinia, Italy

Giovanni Del Rio ( 12 May 1925 – 31 December 2014) was an Italian politician.

Born in Sindia, Province of Nuoro, Del Rio led the Sardinian regional council as President of Sardinia from 1967 to 1970 and again between 1973 and 1976. He was a Christian Democratic deputy for two legislatures, between 1976 and 1983. Del Rio was also undersecretary of Education, of the Council of Ministers and of Transport in the three Andreotti cabinets and undersecretary of Defense in the first Cossiga cabinet.
