= Mario Floris =

Italian politician

Mario Floris (born 20 September 1937) is an Italian politician and trade unionist.

== Career ==
Member of the Christian Democracy, he was elected to the Sardinian regional council for the first time in 1974. He served several times as Assessor in various regional governments: twice at work (Ghinami government), in local authorities (Rojch government) and in general affairs (Cappellacci government). He is the cousin of the Forza Italia senator, Emilio Floris, former mayor of Cagliari.

In 1989, he became president of the Sardinian government for two years and immediately afterwards president of the regional council. After the 1999 elections, after joining the Democratic Union for the Republic founded by Francesco Cossiga, he became president of the regional government for the second time due to the non-acceptance of the programmatic declarations of both the governments formed by Mauro Pili and that formed by Gian Mario Selis.

At the end of the legislature he founded the Union of Sardinians with which he presented himself as a candidate for governor in the regional elections of 2004, obtaining over 35,000 preferences and 3.6% of the votes. He came back in support of the candidate Ugo Cappellacci also in the 2009 election, in the United Sardinia listI. Also in this case Floris will manage to be elected to the council. On 4 October 2010 he became Assessor for General Affairs, Personnel and Reform of the Region.

== Retirement ==
In 2019 he announced his intention not to run again for the regional council.
