= Sardinian Action Party =

Political party in Sardinia

Sardinian Action Party Partito Sardo d'Azione (Italian) Partidu Sardu (Sardinian)
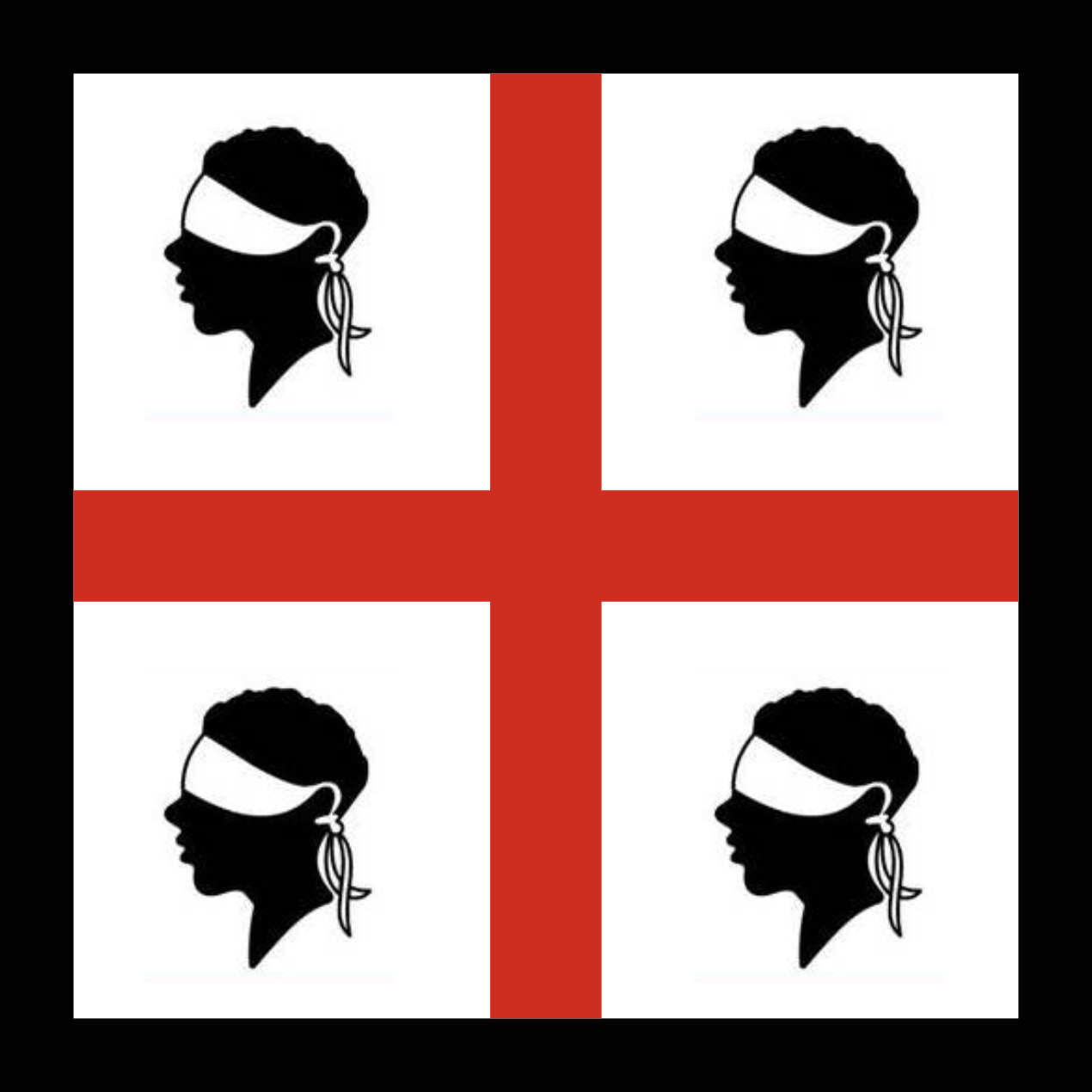
- Secretary: Christian Solinas
- President: Antonio Moro
- Founder: Emilio Lussu
- Founded: 17 April 1921
- Headquarters: Viale Regina Margherita 6, Cagliari
- Newspaper: Il Solco
- Ideology: Sardinian nationalism; Regionalism; Autonomism; Historical: Social democracy; Social liberalism; Separatism; Classical radicalism
- Political position: Right-wing; Historical: Centre-left
- National affiliation: Political party: League; Coalition: Centre-right coalition
- European affiliation: European Free Alliance (1981–2020, expelled)
- Colours: Black Red
- Chamber of Deputies: 0 / 400
- Senate: 0 / 200
- European Parliament: 0 / 76
- Regional Council of Sardinia: 0 / 60
- Conference of Regions: 0 / 21

Party flag

Website
- www.psdaz.net

The Sardinian Action Party (Sardinian: Partidu Sardu, Italian: Partito Sardo d'Azione, PSd'Az or PSdA) is a Sardinian nationalist, regionalist and separatist political party in Sardinia founded by Sardinian anti-fascist intellectual Emilio Lussu. While being traditionally part of the Sardinian centre-left, the party has also sided with the centre-right coalition and, more recently, with the League.

The PSd'Az is one of the oldest stateless nationalist parties active in Europe that promotes autonomy towards the ideal of independence. As such, the party was a founding member of the European Free Alliance in 1984, but was expelled in 2020 because of its alliance with the League.

Christian Solinas, who has led the party since 2015, was elected senator in the 2018 general election and President of Sardinia in the 2019 regional election, the first Sardist to do so since Mario Melis in 1984–1989, leading a centre-right coalition.

== History ==
The party was founded in April 1921. However, it was soon banned under fascism. The party was re-organized after World War II by Emilio Lussu, secretary for Southern Italy of the Action Party during the war, and other veterans from the Sassari brigade and anti-fascists, a social-democratic group of the Italian resistance movement. Lussu left the party in 1948 to found the short-lived Sardinian Socialist Action Party (PSd'AzS), which joined the Italian Socialist Party in 1949, along with many other PSd'Az members. Consequently, the PSd'Az started to cooperate with Christian Democracy and was quite a stable until the 1980s.

The PSd'Az and the PSd'AzS won 10.5% and 6.6% respectively in the first regional election in 1949.

After a decline in term of votes in the 1960s and 1970s, the party re-gained strength in the 1980s (13.8% in 1984 and 12.4% in 1989). Following these results, Sardist Mario Melis was President of Sardinia between 1984 and 1989 at the head of a five-party coalition composed also by the Italian Communist Party, the Italian Socialist Party, the Italian Democratic Socialist Party and the Italian Republican Party. This was the highest point in party history: the PSd'Az was represented in the Italian Parliament from 1983 to 1994, and Melis was a MEP for the Rainbow Group from 1989 to 1994.

The party was affiliated to The Olive Tree during the 1996 general election. However, the party congress rejected a continuation of the alliance ahead the 2001 general election.

In the 2004 Sardinian regional election, the PSd'Az won 3.9% of the vote and 2 regional councillors.

In the 2006 general election, leader Giacomo Sanna, due to an electoral pact named Pact for the Autonomies, was a candidate of the Northern League (LN) for the Senate in Lombardy, but failed to get elected.

The party ran by itself in the 2008 general election, winning a mere 1.5% in the Region.

In the 2009 regional election, the PSd'Az joined the centre-right coalition, provoking the split of the party's left that formed the Red Moors. Cappellacci won and the PSd'Az won 4.3% of the vote (having its strongholds in the traditionally left-wing Provinces of Nuoro and Carbonia-Iglesias, where it gained 7.5 and 7.1%, respectively) and four regional councillors plus one (Giacomo Sanna) elected in Cappellacci's regional list. The Red Moors won 2.5% and one councillor. In the 2010 provincial elections the party was strongest in Nuoro (12.8%), Sassari (6.9%), Olbia-Tempio (6.7%) and Cagliari (6.4%).

In 2013, the PSd'Az broke with Cappellacci and the centre-right, but re-joined the coalition in time for the 2014 regional election. In the election, Cappellacci was defeated and the PSd'Az won 4.7% of the vote and two regional councillors.

In the run-up of the 2018 general election, the party formed once again an electoral pact with the Northern League, which presented itself as "League" all around the country. The alliance managed to get 10.8% of the vote and Christian Solinas, leader of the PSd'Az, was elected to the Senate, while Guido De Martini, a local activist of the League, was elected to the Chamber. This marked the return of the PSd'Az to the Italian Parliament after 22 years. In August 2018, the party was suspended from the European Free Alliance because of its alliance with the League.

In the 2019 regional election, Solinas was elected President of Sardinia with 47.8% of the vote, while the PSd'Az won 9.9%.

In the 2024 regional election, Solinas did not stand for re-election and the centre-right lost the election, with the PSd'Az reduced to 5.4% and three regional councillors. After the election, Solinas was re-elected as its leader during a congress. As a result, two regional councillors out of three left the party. In September, all three PSd'Az elects joined Forza Italia.

== Popular support ==
The party has failed to regain the electoral support it enjoyed upon its foundation (e.g. 36% of the popular vote in 1921 general election).

The party has been mostly marginal in the Sardinan political scene since the post-war period and this marginalisation has increased with the Italian establishment of a bipolar political system in the 1990s.

The electoral results of the PSd'Az in regional and Chamber of Deputies elections in Sardinia since 1946 are shown in the chart below. For 1953 only the regional election's result is shown. In the general elections of 1972, 1976, 1979 and 2006 the party did not run lists for the Chamber of Deputies.

View source data.

== Election results ==
=== Italian Parliament ===
Chamber of Deputies
Election	Leader	Votes	%	Seats	+/–
1921	Camillo Bellieni	35,108	0.53	4 / 535	–
1924	Salvatore Sale	24,059	0.34	2 / 535	▼2
1946	Giovanni Battista Melis	78,554	0.34	2 / 556	–
1948	Giovanni Battista Melis	61,928	0.24	1 / 574	▼1
1953	Giovanni Battista Melis	27,231	0.10	0 / 590	–
1958	Giovanni Battista Melis	173,227 (with MC–PCd'I)	0.59	0 / 596	–
1968	Giovanni Battista Melis	27,228	0.09	0 / 630	–
1979	Carlo Sanna	17,673	0.05	0 / 630	–
1983	Carlo Sanna	91,923	0.25	1 / 630	▲1
1987	Carlo Sanna	169,978	0.44	2 / 630	▲1
1992	Giorgio Ladu	154,621 (with Federalism)	0.39	1 / 630	▼1
1996	Lorenzo Palermo	38,002	0.10	0 / 630	▼1
2001	Giacomo Sanna	34,412 (with SN)	0.09	0 / 630	–
2006	Giacomo Sanna	Into LN–MpA		0 / 630	–
2008	Efisio Trincas	14,856	0.04	0 / 630	–
2013	Giovanni Colli	18,585	0.05	0 / 630	–
2018	Christian Solinas	Into Lega Nord		0 / 630	–
2022	Christian Solinas	Into Lega		0 / 400	–

Senate of the Republic
Election	Leader	Votes	%	Seats	+/–
1948	Giovanni Battista Melis	65,743	0.29	1 / 237	▲1
1953	Giovanni Battista Melis	34,484	0.14	0 / 237	▼1
1958	Giovanni Battista Melis	45,952	0.18	0 / 246	–
1963	Giovanni Battista Melis	34,954	0.13	0 / 315	–
1968	Giovanni Battista Melis	25,891	0.09	0 / 315	–
1972	Giovanni Battista Melis	189,534 (with PCI–PSIUP)	0.63	0 / 315	–
1979	Carlo Sanna	15,766	0.05	0 / 315	–
1983	Carlo Sanna	76,797	0.25	1 / 315	▲1
1987	Carlo Sanna	124,266	0.38	1 / 315	–
1992	Giorgio Ladu	174,713 (with Federalism)	0.52	0 / 315	▼1
1994	Giancarlo Acciaro	88,225	0.27	0 / 315	–
1996	Lorenzo Palermo	421,331 (with The Olive Tree)	1.19	1 / 315	▲1
2001	Giacomo Sanna	32,822 (with SN)	0.10	0 / 315	▼1
2006	Giacomo Sanna	16,733	0.06	0 / 315	–
2008	Efisio Trincas	15,292	0.05	0 / 315	–
2013	Giovanni Colli	18,602	0.06	0 / 315	–
2018	Christian Solinas	Into Lega Nord		1 / 315	▲1
2022	Christian Solinas	Into Lega		0 / 200	▼1

=== European Parliament ===
Election	Leader	Votes	%	Seats	+/–	EP Group
1984 (Note: Run as part of the Federalism coalition.)	Carlo Sanna	193,430 (10th)	0.55	1 / 81	New	RBW
1989	Carlo Sanna	207,739 (12th)	0.60	1 / 81	0	RBW
1994	Did not contest			0 / 87	▼1	–
1999 (Note: Run in a joint list with LAV and CU.)	Antonio Delitala	61,185 (21st)	0.2	0 / 87	0	–
2004 (Note: Run in a joint list with LAL, LFV and UfS.)	Giacomo Sanna	159,098 (18th)	0.49	0 / 78	0	–
2009	Did not contest			0 / 72	0	–
2014	Christian Solinas	Into Lega Nord		0 / 73	0	–
2019	Christian Solinas	Into Lega		0 / 76	0	–
2024	Christian Solinas	Into Lega		0 / 76	0	–

=== Regional Council of Sardinia ===
Election	Leader	Votes	%	Seats	+/–
1949	Piero Soggiu	60,525	10.4	7 / 60	▲7
1953	Giovanni Battista Melis	43,215	7.0	4 / 65	▼3
1957	Pietro Mastino	40,214	6.0	5 / 70	▲1
1961	Giovanni Battista Melis	50,039 (with PRI)	7.2	5 / 72	–
1965	Giovanni Battista Melis	44,621 (with PRI)	6.4	5 / 72	–
1969	Giovanni Battista Melis	33,220	4.4	3 / 74	▼2
1974	Michele Columbu	24,780	3.1	1 / 75	▼2
1979	Carlo Sanna	30,238	3.3	3 / 80	▲2
1984	Carlo Sanna	136,720	13.8	12 / 81	▲9
1989	Carlo Sanna	128,025	12.4	10 / 80	▼2
1994	Giancarlo Acciaro	47,000	5.1	4 / 64	▼6
1999	Antonio Delitala	38,422	4.5	3 / 64	▼1
2004	Giacomo Sanna	32,859	3.9	3 / 85	–
2009	Giovanni Colli	35,428	4.3	4 / 80	▲1
2014	Giovanni Colli	31,886	4.7	3 / 60	▼1
2019	Christian Solinas	69,964	9.9	8 / 60	▲5
2024	Christian Solinas	37,341	5.4	3 / 60	▼5

== Leadership ==
- Secretary: Camillo Bellieni (1921–1922), Paolo Pili (1922), Luigi Oggiano (1922–1923), Salvatore Sale (1923–1925), Ugo Pais (1925–1926), Luigi Battista Puggioni (1926–1945), Giovanni Battista Melis (1945–1948), Piero Soggiu (1948–1951), Giovanni Battista Melis (1951–1953), Pietro Mastino (1953–1957), Giovanni Battista Melis (1957–1974), Michele Columbu (1974–1979), Carlo Sanna (1979–1990), Efisio Pilleri (1990–1991), Giorgio Ladu (1991–1992), Italo Ortu (1992–1994), Giancarlo Acciaro (1994), Cecilia Contu (1994–1995), Lorenzo Palermo (1995–1997), Antonio Delitala (1997–1999), Giacomo Sanna (2000–2006), Efisio Trincas (2006–2009), Giovanni Colli (2009–2014), Giovanni Columbu (2015), Christian Solinas (2015–present)
- President: unknown (1921–unknown), Franco Meloni (unknown–2000), Lorenzo Palermo (2000–2004), Silvano Cadoni (2004–2006), Giacomo Sanna (2006–2015), Giovanni Columbu (2015–2017), Antonio Moro (2018–present)

== Symbols ==
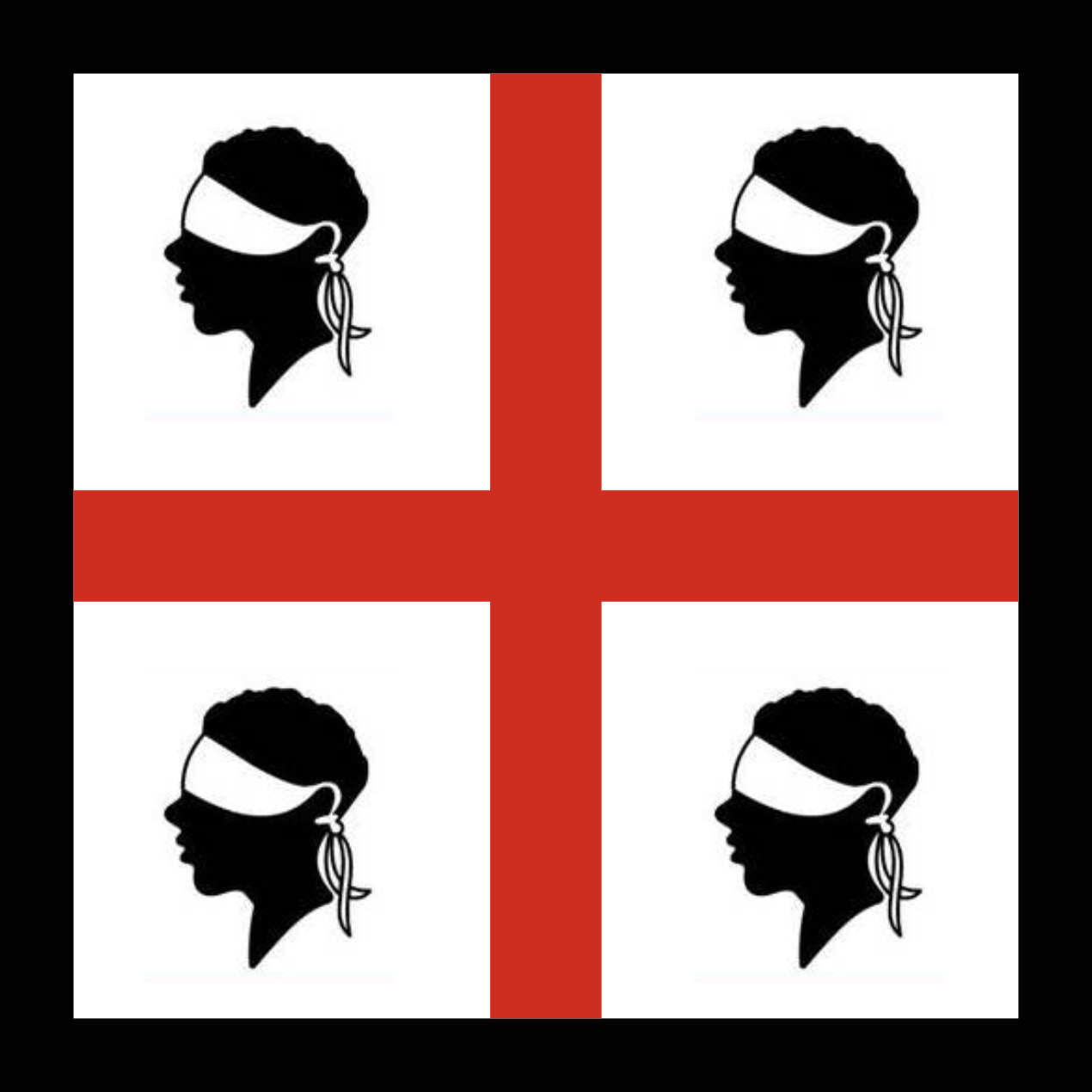
Official logo

Electoral logo
