= List of political parties in Sardinia =

This is the list of political parties in Sardinia, Italy.

No party has ever had the chance of gaining power alone and thus parties must work with each other to form coalition governments. The political parties are currently organized mainly in two political/electoral alliances at the regional level: a centre-right coalition mainly composed of the Brothers of Italy, the Sardinian Reformers and Forza Italia, and a centre-left coalition formed around the Democratic Party and the Five Star Movement.

Sardinia has had plenty of regionalist and/or regional parties, the most successful of which had been the Sardinian Action Party. However, because of their ideological and political factionalism, Sardinian nationalism has played a marginal role in the electoral scene.

== Parties ==
=== Major parties ===
More than 10% in the 2024 regional election (or at least 10 regional councillors):

- Democratic Party (Partito Democratico)
- Brothers of Italy (Fratelli d'Italia)

=== Medium parties ===
Between 4% and 15% in the 2024 regional election (or at least 5 regional councillors):

- Five Star Movement (Movimento Cinque Stelle), including:
  - Forward! (A Innantis!)
- Sardinian Reformers (Riformatori Sardi)
- Forward Italy (Forza Italia)
- Sardinia in the Centre 2020 (Sardegna al Centro 2020)
  - Italy in the Centre – Us Moderates (Italia al Centro – Noi Moderati)
  - Sardinia 20Twenty (Sardinia 20Venti)
- Sardinian Action Party (Partidu Sardu – Partito Sardo d'Azione)
- Greens and Left Alliance (Alleanza Verdi e Sinistra)
  - Green Europe (Europa Verde)
  - Italian Left (Sinistra Italiana)
  - Possible (Possibile)
  - Sardinian Left (Sinistra Sarda)
- Sardinia Alliance (Alleanza Sardegna), including:
  - Italian Liberal Party (Partito Liberale Italiano)

=== Minor parties ===
Between 1% and 4% in the 2024 regional election (or at least 1 regional councillor):

- League Sardinia (Lega Sardegna)
- Sardinia Project (Progetto Sardegna)
- Shared Horizon (Orizzonte Comune)
- Progressive Party (Partito Progressista), including:
  - The Base (La Base Sardegna)
- Future Left (Sinistra Futura)
- Union of the Centre (Unione di Centro)
- Italian Socialist Party (Partito Socialista Italiano), including:
  - Sardinians in Europe (Sardi in Europa)
- Vote Sardinia (Vota Sardigna)
  - Independence Republic of Sardinia (Indipendèntzia Repùbrica de Sardigna)
  - Project Republic of Sardinia (Progetu Repùblica de Sardigna)
  - Sardinia calls Sardinia (Sardinia calls Sardinia)
- Action – More Europe (Azione – Più Europa), including:
  - European Liberal Democrats (Liberali Democratici Europei)
  - Christian Popular Union (Unione Popolare Cristiana)

=== Other regional parties ===
- Forward Together (Fortza Paris)
- Free (Liberu)
- Red Moors (Rosso Mori)
- Sardinia Nation Independence (Sardigna Natzione Indipendentzia)
- Sardinia 2050 (Sardegna 2050)

=== Former regional parties ===
At least 1% in a regional, general or EP election in Sardinia (or at least 2 regional councillors):

- Sardinian Socialist Action Party (Partito Sardo d'Azione Socialista)
- Independentist Sardinian Party (Partidu Sardu Indipendentista)
- New Movement (Nuovo Movimento)
- Sardinian People's Party (Partito del Popolo Sardo)
- Democratic Federation (Federazione Democratica)
- Sardinian Autonomist Populars (Popolari Autonomisti Sardi)
- Sardinia Tomorrow (Sardegna Domani)
- A Manca pro s'Indipendèntzia (A Manca pro s'Indipendentzia)
- United Independentist Front (Fronte Indipendentista Unidu)
- Sardinia Free Zone Movement (Movimento Sardegna Zona Franca)
- Sardinian Independentist Party (Partidu Indipendentista Sardu)
- Free Sardinia (Sardigna Libera)
- Sovereignty (Soberania)
- United (Unidos)
- Union of Sardinians (Unione dei Sardi)
- Civic Sardinia (Sardegna Civica)
- Party of Sardinians (Partito dei Sardi)

== See also ==
- Sardinian nationalism
- List of political parties in Italy
