= Party of Sardinians =

Party of Sardinians Partito dei Sardi
- Leaders: Franciscu Sedda; Paolo Maninchedda
- Ideology: Regionalism; Sardinian nationalism Social democracy Separatism
- Political position: Centre-left
- Regional Council of Sardinia: 0 / 60

Website
- www.ilpartitodeisardi.eu

The Party of Sardinians (Italian: Partito dei Sardi, PdS) was a regionalist, Sardinian nationalist, social-democratic and separatist political party in Sardinia.

== History ==
In July 2012 Franciscu Sedda and Ornella Demuru, husband and wife, left Project Republic of Sardinia (ProgReS), a party they were instrumental to launch, over disagreements with the new party leadership and the rise of Michela Murgia, a writer who was headed to become the party's candidate in the 2014 regional election. In July 2013 Sedda launched the PdS along with Paolo Maninchedda, a splinter from the Sardinian Action Party (PSd'Az). At the party's first congress Sedda declared: "Let's start to think and act as a state and a nation, and self-determination will come, maybe not today, but much sooner than we think". The PdS, which long sought an alliance with the centre-left led by the Democratic Party (PD), was welcomed in the coalition, along with the Red Moors and Independence Republic of Sardinia (iRS).

In the 2014 regional election the party won 2.7% of the vote and two regional councillors. In December 2017 Sedda and Maninchedda exchanged leadership roles: the former, who used to be secretary, became president, while the latter, who used to be president, became secretary.

In the 2019 regional election the PdS ran alone with Maninchedda as its candidate for president. They obtained 3.7% and 3.4%, respectively, thus, even though that was an improvement from five years before, the party fell short of entering the Regional Council again as the threshold was at 4% for parties outside big coalitions. After the election, Sedda resigned from president.

In late 2022 the party was basically replaced by "Sardinian Nation – Justice and Liberty" (reference to Giustizia e Libertà). Since later in 2023 the party's website was no longer active. The new party joined the regionalist coalition led by Renato Soru in the 2024 Sardinian regional election.

== Leadership ==
- Secretary: Franciscu Sedda (2013–2017), Paolo Maninchedda (2017–2023 ca.)
- President: Paolo Maninchedda (2013–2017), Franciscu Sedda (2017–2019)
