= Christian Popular Union =

Christian Popular Union Unione Popolare Cristiana
- Leader: Antonio Satta
- Secretary: Antonio Gaia
- Founded: 2009
- Split from: Union of Democrats for Europe
- Ideology: Christian democracy
- Political position: Centre
- National affiliation: Centre-left coalition
- Chamber of Deputies: 0 / 400
- Senate: 0 / 200
- European Parliament: 0 / 76
- Regional Council of Sardinia: 0 / 60

The Christian Popular Union (Italian: Unione Popolare Cristiana, UPC) is a Christian-democratic political party in Italy.

== History ==
The UPC was launched in August 2009 by Antonio Satta, a former Christian Democrat who had been the regional leader of the Union of Democrats for Europe (UDEUR) and, later, of the Sardinian Autonomist Populars. The party was based and had its best electoral results in Sardinia, but had a structure countrywide, consisting primarily of former members of the UDEUR, notably including Gianfranco Saraca, Luca Bagliani, Danilo Bertoli, Sergio Deorsola, and Antonio Potenza (leader of Basilicata's United Populars).

In the 2010 Sardinian provincial elections the party did especially well in northern Sardinia: 10.7% in Sassari and 6.2% in Olbia-Tempio. Massimo Mulas, a regional councillor elected with the Union of Sardinians in the 2009 regional election, joined the party during the legislature. In June 2012, through Mulas, the UPC joined the newly formed parliamentary group Sardinia Tomorrow, along with other centrist councillors.

In the 2014 regional election the party won 1.7% of the vote and one regional councillor, Gaetano Ledda.

In 2015 the Council of State reassessed the composition of the Regional Council and two more UPC members, Antonio Gaia and Piefranco Zanchetta, gained seats. A month before, however, Ledda had left the party and joined The Base Sardinia.

In the run-up of the 2018 general election the UPC joined the Popular Civic List (CP), a centrist electoral list within the centre-left coalition, comprising mainly Popular Alternative (AP), Italy of Values (IdV), the Centrists for Europe (CpE), Solidary Democracy (DemoS), the Union for Trentino (UpT) and Italy Is Popular (IP). CP obtained a mere 0.5% and no seats.

In the 2019 regional election the party won 1.5% of the vote and no seats in a joint list with the Italian Socialist Party.

In the 2024 regional election the party was a junior partner of a joint list formed primarily by Action and More Europe.

== Leadership ==
- Secretary: Antonio Satta (2009–2020 ca.)
- President: Gianfranco Saraca (2009–2014)
- Regional secretary (Sardinia): Enrico Piras (2009–2014), Antonio Satta (2014–2020 ca.)
