= 2019 Sardinian regional election =

- 24 February 2019

All 60 seats to the Regional Council of Sardinia
- Turnout: 53.8% (▲1.5%)
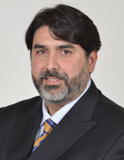

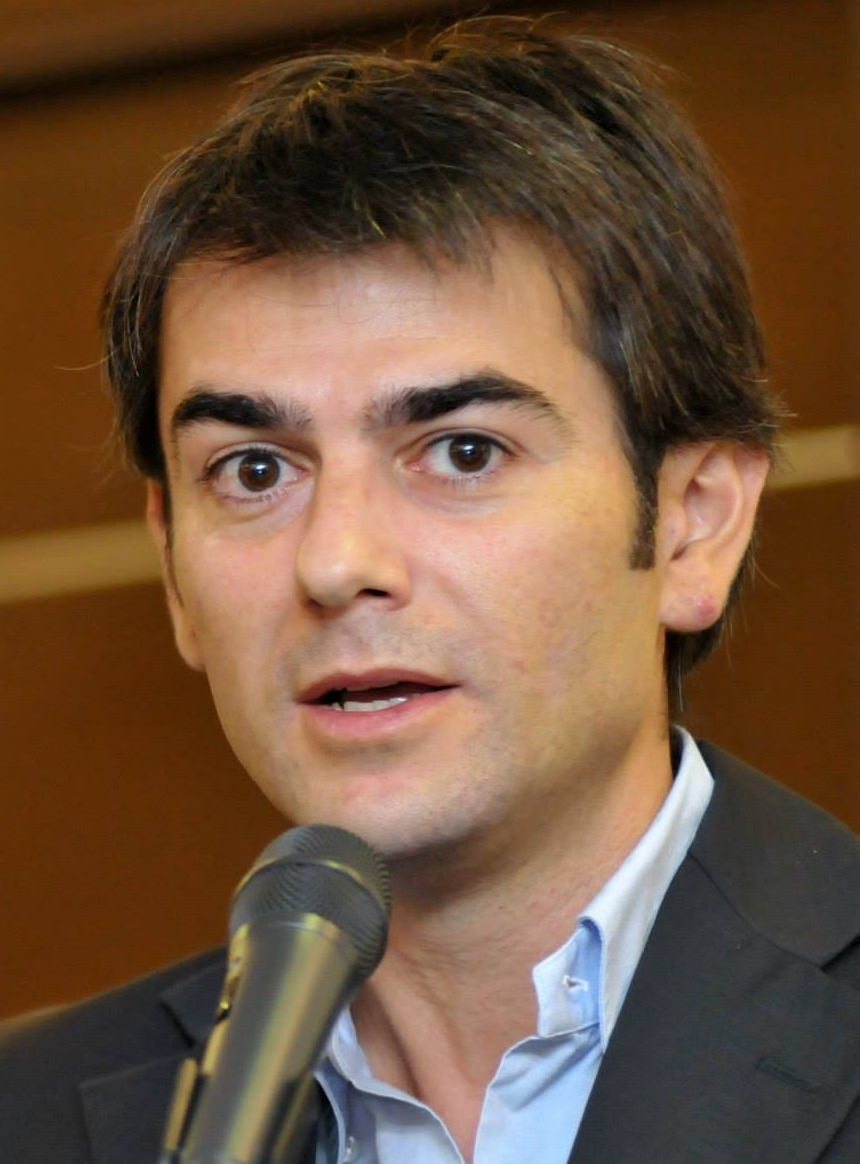

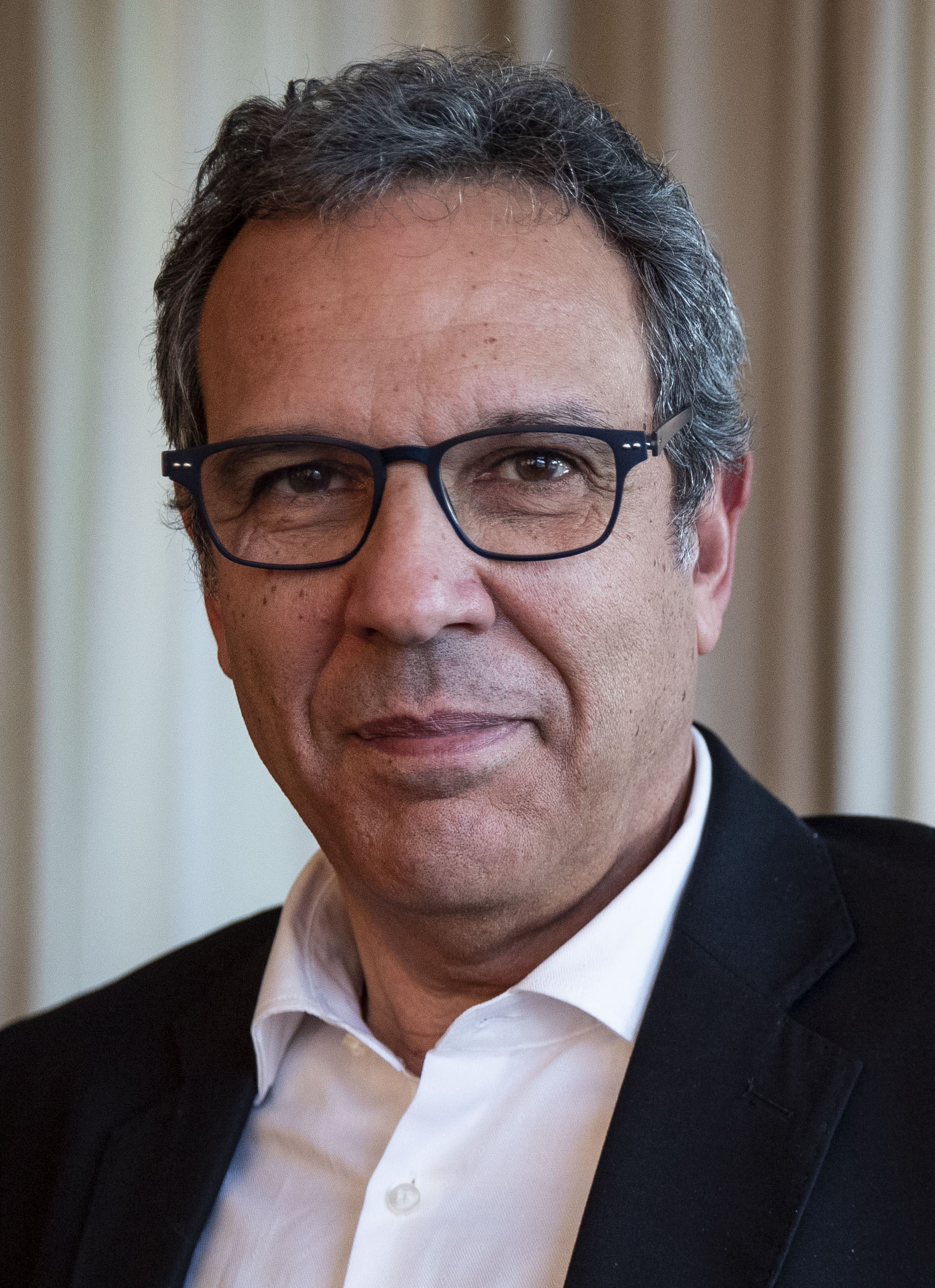
	Majority party	Minority party	Third party
Candidate	Christian Solinas	Massimo Zedda	Francesco Desogus
Party	PSd'Az	Progressive Camp	Five Star Movement
Alliance	Centre-right	Centre-left	None
Seats won	36	18	6
Seat change	▲12	▼18	new
Popular vote	364,059	250,797	85,342
Percentage	47.8%	32.9%	11.2%
Swing	▲8.2%	▼11.5%	new
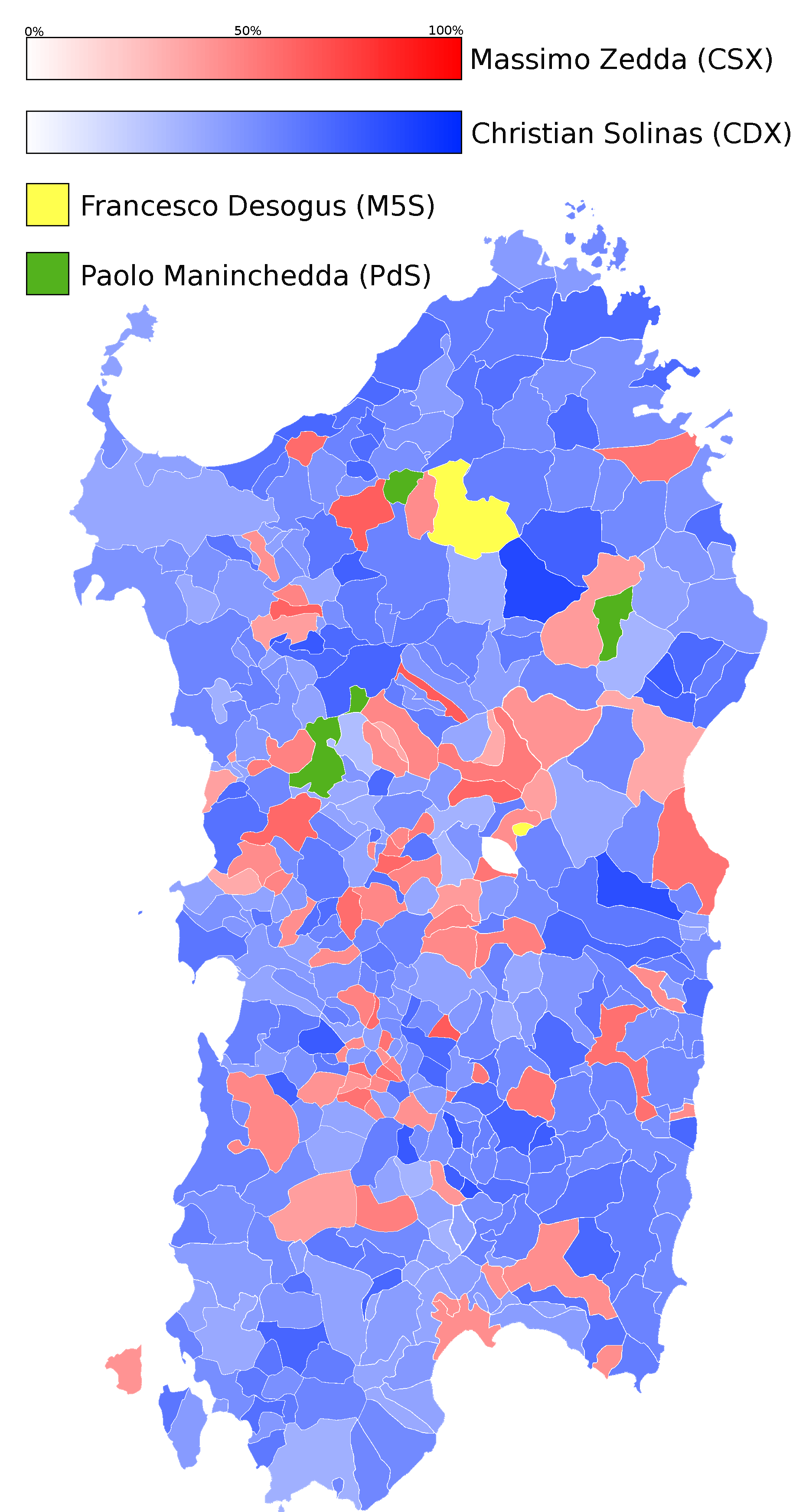
- The map shows the winning candidate by each Comune.
President before election
Francesco Pigliaru
PD
Elected President
Christian Solinas
PSd'Az

The 2019 Sardinian regional election took place in this Italian region on 24 February 2019. The election was for all 59 elected seats of the Regional Council of Sardinia as well as the President of the Region who, along with the second placed presidential candidate, would also become members of the Regional Council.

This was the first Sardinian regional election with the participation of League and M5S. The incumbent President (Francesco Pigliaru, PD) did not run for a second term.

The ballot resulted in the election of Christian Solinas, the centre-right candidate, as President of the Regional Council with 47.8% of the votes. The centre-left candidate, Cagliari Mayor Massimo Zedda, came in second with 33 percent. The Five Star Movement candidate, Francesco Desogus, received 11 percent of the vote.

== Electoral law ==
The candidate who obtains a plurality of the votes is elected President of Sardinia. If the elected candidate obtains at least 25% of the votes, the majority of the seats on the board are guaranteed on the lists who support him. The law provides for a single round, with a list vote, the possibility of expressing a preference within the chosen list, and voting for the presidential candidate, on a single card. It is possible to vote for a list and for a candidate who is not connected to each other (Article 9). The candidate who has obtained the relative majority is elected president (Article 1, paragraph 4). To the lists connected to the president-elect, a majority prize may be awarded in the following measure: 60% of the seats if the president-elect obtained a percentage of preference above 40%; 55% of the seats if the elected president has obtained a percentage of preferences between 25% and 40%, while no majority prize is awarded if the president is elected with less than 25% (Article 13). The law provides for a 10% threshold for coalitions, and 5% for non-coalitized lists (Article 1, paragraph 7). No barriers are foreseen for the lists within the coalitions that have exceeded 10%.

== Campaign ==
On 13 February certain groups of dairy farmers within the region announced an ultimatum that if the decrease in prices is not prevented then they would block entrances to the polling stations on election day.

== Parties and candidates ==
Political party or alliance	Constituent lists	Previous result		Candidate
Political party or alliance	Constituent lists	Votes (%)	Seats	Candidate
Centre-left coalition	Democratic Party (PD)	22.1	18	Massimo Zedda
Centre-left coalition	Christian Popular Union–Italian Socialist Party (UPC–PSI)	3.1 (Note: 1.7 % of the vote to UPC, 1.4 % of the vote to PSI.)	2 (Note: 1 seat to UPC, 1 seat to PSI.)	Massimo Zedda
Centre-left coalition	Progressive Camp Sardinia (CPS)	—N/a	—N/a	Massimo Zedda
Centre-left coalition	Free and Equal Sardinia (LeU)	—N/a	—N/a	Massimo Zedda
Centre-left coalition	We, Sardinia	—N/a	—N/a	Massimo Zedda
Centre-left coalition	Sardinia in Common (incl. Futura, Pos, +E, FdV, Sardinian Radicals)	—N/a	—N/a	Massimo Zedda
Centre-left coalition	Common Future	—N/a	—N/a	Massimo Zedda
Centre-left coalition	Communist Project for Sardinia (PCS)	—N/a	—N/a	Massimo Zedda
Centre-right coalition	Forza Italia (FI)	18.5	10	Christian Solinas
Centre-right coalition	Union of the Centre (UdC)	7.6	4	Christian Solinas
Centre-right coalition	Sardinian Reformers (RS)	6.0	3	Christian Solinas
Centre-right coalition	Sardinian Action Party (PSd'Az)	4.7	3	Christian Solinas
Centre-right coalition	Brothers of Italy (FdI)	2.8	1	Christian Solinas
Centre-right coalition	Union of Sardinians (UDS)	2.6	1	Christian Solinas
Centre-right coalition	Fortza Paris (FP)	0.7	–	Christian Solinas
Centre-right coalition	League (Lega)	—N/a	—N/a	Christian Solinas
Centre-right coalition	Energies for Italy (EpI) (incl. ALI, PRI and PLI)	—N/a	—N/a	Christian Solinas
Centre-right coalition	Sardinia 20Twenty (S20V)	—N/a	—N/a	Christian Solinas
Centre-right coalition	Civic Sardinia (SC)	—N/a	—N/a	Christian Solinas
Five Star Movement (M5S)		—N/a	—N/a	Francesco Desogus
Free Sardinians (incl. ProgReS, Unidos and Free Sardinia)		5.6 (Note: 2.8 % of the vote to ProgReS, 2.8 % of the vote to Unidos.)	–	Mauro Pili
Autodeterminatzione (ADN) (incl. RM, iRS and SNI)		3.4 (Note: 2.6 % of the vote to RM, 0.8 % of the vote to iRS.)	3 (Note: 2 seats to RM, 1 seat to iRS.)	Andrea Murgia
Party of Sardinians (PdS)		2.7	2	Paolo Maninchedda
Communist Refoundation–Italian Communists–Sardinian Left (PRC–PCI–SS)		2.0	2	Vindice Lecis

== Opinion polls ==
Exit poll

Date	Polling firm	Zedda	Solinas	Desogus	Pili	Others	Lead
24 Feb 2019	Election Result	32.9	47.8	11.2	2.3	5.8	14.9
24 Feb 2019	Consorzio Opinio	35.0–39.0	36.5–40.5	13.5–17.5	N/A	N/A	1.5
29 Jan 2019	SWG	31.0	35.0	24.0	5.0	5.0	4.0
26 Nov 2018	Euromedia	29.3	43.7	27.0	N/A	N/A	14.4
Oct 2018	SWG	29.0	38.0	28.0	N/A	5.0	9.0

== Results ==
24 February 2019 Sardinia regional election results
Candidates	Votes	%	Seats	Parties	Votes	%	Seats
Christian Solinas	364,059	47.78	1	League	81,421	11.40	8
Christian Solinas	364,059	47.78	1	Sardinian Action Party	70,434	9.86	7
Christian Solinas	364,059	47.78	1	Forza Italia	57,430	8.04	5
Christian Solinas	364,059	47.78	1	Sardinian Reformers	36,299	5.08	4
Christian Solinas	364,059	47.78	1	Brothers of Italy	33,716	4.72	3
Christian Solinas	364,059	47.78	1	Sardinia 20Twenty	29,473	4.12	3
Christian Solinas	364,059	47.78	1	Union of the Centre	26,948	3.77	3
Christian Solinas	364,059	47.78	1	Civic Sardinia	11,689	1.63	1
Christian Solinas	364,059	47.78	1	Fortza Paris	11,611	1.62	1
Christian Solinas	364,059	47.78	1	Union of Sardinians	7,828	1.09	–
Christian Solinas	364,059	47.78	1	Energies for Italy	3,505	0.49	–
Christian Solinas	364,059	47.78	1	Total	370,354	51.87	35
Massimo Zedda	250,797	32.92	1	Democratic Party	96,235	13.47	8
Massimo Zedda	250,797	32.92	1	Free and Equal Sardinia	27,077	3.79	2
Massimo Zedda	250,797	32.92	1	Progressive Camp Sardinia	22,671	3.17	2
Massimo Zedda	250,797	32.92	1	We, Sardinia	20,011	2.80	2
Massimo Zedda	250,797	32.92	1	Common Future	18,750	2.62	2
Massimo Zedda	250,797	32.92	1	Sardinia in Common	17,566	2.46	1
Massimo Zedda	250,797	32.92	1	Christian Popular Union–Italian Socialist Party	9,275	1.30	–
Massimo Zedda	250,797	32.92	1	Communist Project for Sardinia	3,075	0.43	–
Massimo Zedda	250,797	32.92	1	Total	214,660	30.06	17
Francesco Desogus	85,342	11.20	–	Five Star Movement	69,573	9.74	6
Paolo Maninchedda	25,559	3.35	–	Party of Sardinians	26,216	3.67	–
Mauro Pili	17,593	2.31	–	Free Sardinians	15,234	2.13	–
Andrea Murgia	13,955	1.83	–	Autodeterminatzione	13,657	1.91	–
Vindice Lecis	4,528	0.59	–	Communist Refoundation–Italian Communists–Sardinian Left	4,308	0.60	–
Invalid votes	30,440	–					
Total candidates	790,709	100.00	2	Total parties	706,020	100.00	58
Registered voters	1,470,401	53.77					
Source: Autonomous Region of Sardinia – Results (1,833 of 1,840 President; 1,825 of 1,840 Lists); Seats

Popular vote
PD	13.47%
Lega	11.40%
PSd'Az	9.86%
M5S	9.74%
FI	8.04%
RS	5.08%
FdI	4.72%
S2020	4.13%
LeU	3.79%
UdC	3.77%
PdS	3.67%
CP	3.17%
Noi	2.80%
FC	2.62%
SiC	2.46%
Others	11.28%

President
Solinas	47.78%
Zedda	32.91%
Desogus	11.20%
Maninchedda	3.35%
Pili	2.31%
Murgia	1.83%
Lecis	0.59%

=== Voter turnout ===
Region	Time		
Region	12:00	19:00	22:00
Sardinia	16.77%	43.78%	53.77%
Province	Time		
Province	12:00	19:00	22:00
Cagliari	18.58%	45.25%	55.52%
Nuoro	15.78%	43.36%	53.18%
Oristano	14.85%	41.87%	51.25%
Sassari	16.04%	44.28%	54.65%
Medio Campidano	15.30%	40.41%	50.85%
Carbonia Iglesias	16.61%	42.00%	51.35%
Ogliastra	16.24%	44.46%	54.26%
Olbia Tempio	16.28%	43.47%	52.73%
Source: Autonomous Region of Sardinia – Turnout
