= Sardinian Independentist Party =

Political party in Sardinia

The Sardinian Independentist Party (Partidu Indipendentista Sardu, ParIS) was a minor far-left separatist party in Sardinia.

In the 2009 regional election the party was affiliated along with Sardigna Natzione Indipendentzia and A Manca pro s'Indipendèntzia to the "Unidade Indipendentista", which gained 0.5% of the vote. In the 2010 provincial elections the party won 0.8% in the Province of Oristano, 0.7% in Medio Campidano, 0.4% in Sassari and 0.3% in Cagliari.
