= Civic Sardinia =

Civic Sardinia Sardegna Civica
- Leader: Franco Cuccureddu
- Founded: 2018
- Dissolved: 2023
- Merged into: Shared Horizon
- Ideology: Regionalism
- Political position: Centre-right
- Regional affiliation: Centre-right coalition

Civic Sardinia (Italian: Sardegna Civica, abbr. SC) was a regionalist political party active in Sardinia, led by Franco Cuccureddu.

== History ==
At the end of 2018, Cuccureddu, who had previously been a leading member and deputy secretary of the Movement for the Autonomies, as well as a regional councillor in 2009–2014, launched the new party, within the centre-right coalition.

The party participated in the 2019 Sardinian regional election, in which Christian Solinas of the Sardinian Action Party was elected president of Sardinia, and obtained 1.6% of the vote and one seat, for Roberto Caredda, a former member of Forza Italia and The People of Freedom.

In the subsequent 2019 local elections, lists promoted by SC obtained 1.7% of the vote in Cagliari (in support of centre-right candidate Paolo Truzzu) and 7.9% of the vote and six seats in Sassari (in support of Nanni Campus). Both candidates backed by the party were elected. However, at the end of 2021, the party broke with the majority in Sassari and left the municipal government.

In early 2020 SC, the Union of Sardinians (led by Antonio Nicolini) and Fortza Paris (led by Gianfranco Scalas) formed a joint political coordination, that was short-lived.

In March 2022 Caredda left SC, launched a new party named Idea Sardinia, along with Carla Cuccu and Giovanni Antonio Satta, who were splinters of the Five Star Movement and Sardinian Reformers, respectively, and joined the opposition to the regional government.

In July 2023 Cuccureddu launched a new party, Shared Horizon, and aligned it with the centre-left coalition.

== Electoral results ==
=== Regional elections ===
Election	Votes	%	Seats	+/–
2019	11,689	1.63	1 / 60	New
