= The Base (Sardinian political party) =

The Base La Base
- President: Efisio Arbau
- Founded: 2010
- Split from: Democratic Party
- Ideology: Regionalism; Sardinian nationalism
- Political position: Left-wing

The Base (Italian: La Base) is a left-wing political party active in Sardinia, led by Efisio Arbau.

== History ==
The party was established in 2010 by Efisio Arbau, mayor of Ollolai since 2005. Arbau, a member of the Democratic Party, asked a primary election for the presidency of the Province of Nuoro. Denied of the primary, as the party wanted to confirm the incumbent Roberto Deriu, Arbau did not give up his candidacy and was expelled from the party along with seven other Democratic activists. The regional section of the PD was also divided on the case: MPs Antonello Soro, Gian Piero Scanu, Guido Melis and Caterina Pes supported Arbau, and regional councillor Francesca Barracciu described the expulsion of Arbau as a "squad and Holy Inquisition method". Arbau thus ran for president in the provincial election – won again by Deriu – in alliance with Italy of Values, the Greens, the Red Moors and Left Ecology Freedom, arguing, during the entire electoral campaign, that the Democratic Party had now become a right-wing party. Arbau came in third, with 23.9% of the vote.

In 2013 Arbau took over the seat in the Regional Council from Barriacciu, who had been elected to the European Parliament, and joined the Sardinia is already Tomorrow group. However, Arbau left the group shortly after, in dissent with the chairman Mario Diana on the request for a secret vote on the amendment to the double preference, thus causing its dissolution.

In the 2014 regional election, The Base took part in the centre-left coalition in support of Francesco Pigliaru's candidacy, which later turned out to be a winner. Despite the 0.7% of the vote obtained by the party, Arbau was re-elected to the Regional Council. However, in 2015, the Council of State declared Arbau lapsed from the charge along with three other regional councilors.

In 2018 Arbau announced the confluence of The Base in the Sardinian Action Party, an associate party of the predominantly right-wing League–Sardinia. The alliance with the Sardinian Action Party and with the League caused the discontent of many members of The Base, such as the deputy mayor of Nuoro Sebastian Cocco, who decided to leave the party.

However, in the 2024 regional election the party formed a joint list with the left-wing Progressive Party.

== Electoral results ==
=== Regional elections ===
Election	Votes	%	Seats	+/–
2014	4,897	0.71	1 / 60	New
2024	Into PP		0 / 60	Steady
