= Sardinian Reformers =

Sardinian Reformers Riformatori Sardi
- Leader: Michele Cossa
- Coordinator: Pietrino Fois
- President: Roberto Frongia
- Founded: 1993
- Headquarters: via Firenze, 20; 09126 Cagliari
- Ideology: Regionalism; Liberal conservatism
- Political position: Centre-right
- National affiliation: Segni Pact (1993–2003); Pact of Liberal Democrats (2003–2006); Civic Choice (2013–2016)
- Regional affiliation: Centre-right coalition
- Regional Council of Sardinia: 3 / 60

Website
- www.riformatori.it

The Sardinian Reformers (Italian: Riformatori Sardi, RS) is a regionalist and liberal-conservative political party in Sardinia, Italy, led by Michele Cossa. The party, which has always been part of the centre-right at the Sardinian regional level, is a keen supporter of the free market, competition, globalization and a two-party system.

== History ==
The party emerged in 1993 as the Sardinian section of the Segni Pact. This list was launched by Mario Segni, a former Christian Democrat from Sardinia, and was composed of former Christian Democrats and Liberals.

When the Segni Pact entered The Olive Tree centre-left coalition in the run-up for the 1996 general election (through Italian Renewal), the RS gained some independence from the mother-party, and, when at the 1999 European Parliament election Segni formed a joint electoral list with National Alliance, some of their members looked closer to Forza Italia.

Led by Michele Cossa and Massimo Fantola, the RS were part of the centre-right in Sardinia since 1999 and, at the 2001 general election, Cossa was elected deputy in a single-seat constituency in Cagliari for the House of Freedoms coalition.

During the years in government of Silvio Berlusconi (2001–2006), the RS started to be critical of the centre-right. In 2003 the RS contributed to the foundation of the new national party of Mario Segni named Pact of Liberal Democrats. This party was on the ballot at the 2004 European Parliament election and won only a misere 0.5% (7.4% in Sardinia). In the same year RS won 5.9% of the vote at the regional election, having four Reformers elected to the Regional Council.

In the 2006 general election, Fantola was elected senators for the Union of Christian and Centre Democrats (UDC), at the time member of the House of Freedoms, while Cossa, candidate for the Chamber of Deputies, failed to be elected. For the 2008 general election they tried to form an alliance with The People of Freedom, but talks failed.

At the 2009 regional election, the party was part of the centre-right coalition in support of Ugo Cappellacci, who was elected president. The RS won 6.8% of the vote (having their strongholds in the provinces of Oristano and Olbia-Tempio, where they gained 10.0 and 8.7%, respectively) and five regional councillors (including Cossa) plus one (Franco Meloni, a former leading member of the Sardinian Action Party) elected in Cappellacci's regional list.

At the 2010 provincial elections, the party was strongest in Oristano (9.0%), Olbia-Tempio (8.9%) and Cagliari (7.3%). In 2011 Fantola was the centre-right candidate for mayor of Cagliari, but he was severely defeated by his left-wing opponent.

In the 2013 general election, the RS were part of Civic Choice and Reformer Pierpaolo Vargiu was elected to the Chamber.

In the 2014 regional election, during which Cappellacci lost to Francesco Pigliaru, the RS won 6.0% of the vote and three regional councillors.

In the 2019 regional election, the RS supported the winning President, Christian Solinas of the Sardinian Action Party, won 5.0% of the vote and three regional councillors.

In the 2024 regional election, the RS, a member of the losing centre-right coalition, obtained 7.2% of the vote and doubled its regional councillors to three.

== Popular support ==
The electoral results of the RS in Sardinia since 1994 are shown in the table below.

1994 general	1994 European	1994 regional	1996 general	1999 European	1999 regional	2001 general	2004 European	2004 regional	2006 general	2008 general	2009 regional	2009 European	2013 general
17.4 (Note: This result refers to the list of the Segni Pact.)	15.0	9.2	7.0 (Note: This result refers to the Italian Renewal which formed a joint list with RS.)	(Note: The RS took part to the joint list of National Alliance and the Segni Pact that gained 12.7% in Sardinia.)	4.4	-	7.4 (Note: The result refers to the Pact of Liberal Democrats that comprised RS candidates for Sardinia.)	6.0	(Note: The RS formed a joint list with the Union of Christian and Centre Democrats that gained 7.7% in Sardinia.)	-	6.8	-	6.0 (Note: The result refers to the Civic Choice which formed a joint list with RS.)

2014 European	2014 regional	2018 general	2019 European	2019 regional	2022 general	2024 regional	2024 European
-	6.0	-	-	5.0	-	7.2	(Note: The RS took part to the joint list of Forza Italia and the Us Moderates that gained 9.8% in Sardinia.)

=== Regional elections ===
Election	Votes	%	Seats	+/–
1999	38,259	4.40	4 / 64	–
2004	50,953	6.00	4 / 64	–
2009	56,056	6.78	5 / 80	▲1
2014	41,060	6.02	3 / 60	▼2
2019	36,171	5.09	4 / 64	▲1
2024	48,423	7.09	3 / 60	▼1

== See also ==
- Sardinian nationalism
