= Sardinia Free Zone Movement =

Sardinia Free Zone Movement Movimento Sardegna Zona Franca
- President: Maria Rosaria Randaccio
- Founded: 2012
- Headquarters: Via Tigellio, 24/A, 09123 Cagliari
- Ideology: Autonomism
- Regional Council of Sardinia: 0 / 60

The Sardinia Free Zone Movement (Italian: Movimento Sardegna Zona Franca) is a political party active in Sardinia, led by Maria Rosaria Randaccio.

== History ==
The movement was founded in 2012 with the aim of establishing a free zone regime in the territory of the Autonomous Region of Sardinia. Its founders were Maria Rosaria Randaccio and the lawyer Francesco Scifo.

In the 2014 regional election, the movement took part in the centre-right coalition in support of the candidacy of the outgoing president Ugo Cappellacci, obtaining 1.6% of the vote and one seat, won by Modesto Fenu. However, in 2015, the Council of State declared Fenu lapsed from the charge along with three other regional councilors.

In 2018, Paolo Aureli and Francesco Scifo, respectively outgoing vice president and secretary of the movement, announced their adhesion to the list "Free Sardinians", headed by Mauro Pili, on the occasion of the 2019 regional election.

In the same election, Randaccio, remained president of the movement, was a candidate among the ranks of Forza Italia in the constituency of Cagliari, but without being elected.

A few months later, Randaccio is still a candidate on the Forza Italia list in the municipal elections of Cagliari on June 16, in support of Paolo Truzzu's candidacy for mayor. However, even on this occasion she was not elected.

== Electoral results ==
=== Sardinian regional elections ===
Election year	# of overall votes	% of overall vote	# of overall seats won
2014	11,150	1.63	1 / 60
2019	Into Forza Italia		0 / 60

== Leadership ==
- President: Maria Rosaria Randaccio (2012–present)
- Vice President: Paolo Aureli (2015–2018)
- Secretary: Francesco Scifo (2012–2018)
