= 2004 Sardinian regional election =

- 12–13 June 2004

All 85 seats to the Regional Council of Sardinia
- Turnout: 71.2% (▲4.9%)
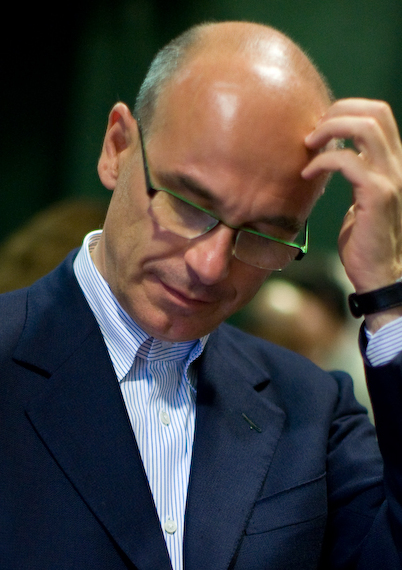

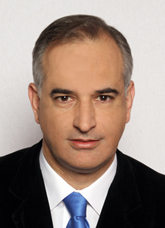
	Majority party	Minority party
Candidate	Renato Soru	Mauro Pili
Party	DS	Forza Italia
Alliance	The Olive Tree	House of Freedoms
Seats won	51	30
Seat change	▲14	▼7
Popular vote	487,692	394,271
Percentage	50.1%	40.5%
Swing	▲19.6%	▼7.6%
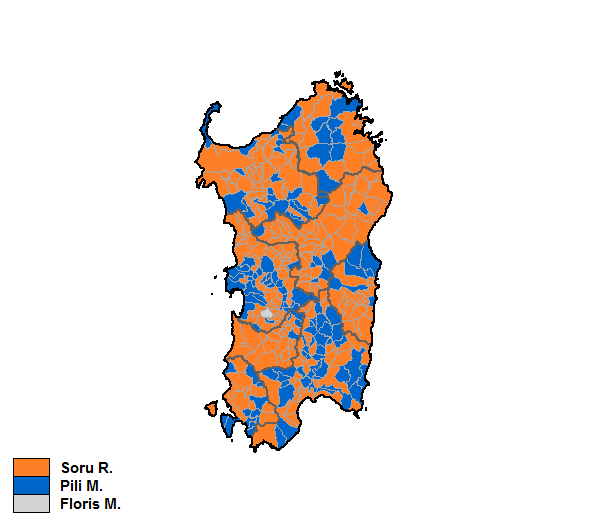
President before election
Italo Masala
National Alliance
Elected President
Renato Soru
DS

The Sardinian regional election of 2004 took place in Sardinia in Italy on 12–13 June 2004.

The center-left businessman Renato Soru was elected President of the Region defeating Mauro Pili, who won the 1999 election but served as president just for two years between 2001 and 2003.

== New electoral system ==
Because of the political imbalances created by the previous electoral system, which potentially allowed the election of a candidate to the presidency without giving him a majority in the Regional Council as it happened after the 1999 election, in 2003 Sardinia adopted a new electoral law.

The new electoral system was the national Tatarella Law of 1995, used by most of Italian regions to elect their Council. Sixty-four councillors were elected in provincial constituencies by proportional representation using the largest remainder method with a Droop quota and open lists; remained seats and votes were grouped at regional level where a Hare quota is used, and then distributed to provincial party lists.

Nine councillors were elected at-large using a general ticket: parties were grouped in alliances, and the alliance which received a plurality of votes elected all its candidates, its leader becoming the President of Sardinia. A possible second round election between the two main candidates was abolished.

== Council apportionment ==
According to the official 2001 Italian census, the 64 Council seats which must be covered by proportional representation were so distributed between Sardinian provinces.

CA	CI	MC	NU	OG	OT	OR	SS	total
21	5	4	7	2	5	7	13	64

It must be underlined that this allocation is not fixed. Remained seats and votes after proportional distribution, are all grouped at regional level and divided by party lists.

== Results ==
12–13 June 2004 Sardinian regional election results
Candidate	Regional lists			Provincial lists				Total
Candidate	votes	%	seats	Party	votes	%	seats	group
Renato Soru	487,692	50.16	8	Democrats of the Left	112,757	13.28	13	51
Renato Soru	487,692	50.16	8	Democracy is Freedom – The Daisy	95,256	10.90	10	51
Renato Soru	487,692	50.16	8	Sardinia Project	66,690	7.85	7	51
Renato Soru	487,692	50.16	8	Communist Refoundation Party	35,142	4.14	5	51
Renato Soru	487,692	50.16	8	Italian Democratic Socialists	32,245	3.80	3	51
Renato Soru	487,692	50.16	8	Union of Democrats for Europe	22,610	2.66	3	51
Renato Soru	487,692	50.16	8	Party of Italian Communists	16,010	1.88	1	51
Renato Soru	487,692	50.16	8	Italy of Values	8,588	1.01	1	51
Renato Soru	487,692	50.16	8	Federation of the Greens	7,048	0.83	0	51
Mauro Pili	394,271	40.53	1	Forza Italia	128,563	15.13	10	30
Mauro Pili	394,271	40.53	1	Union of Christian and Centre Democrats	88,179	10.39	7	30
Mauro Pili	394,271	40.53	1	National Alliance	63,001	7.42	5	30
Mauro Pili	394,271	40.53	1	Sardinian Reformers	50,953	6.00	4	30
Mauro Pili	394,271	40.53	1	Fortza Paris	39,086	4.49	3	30
Mauro Pili	394,271	40.53	1	New Italian Socialist Party	8,965	1.06	0	30
Giacomo Sanna	36,720	3.72	-	Sardinian Action Party	32,859	3.87	2	2
Giacomo Sanna	36,720	3.72	-	Sardinia Nation	5,031	0.59	0	2
Mario Floris	35,460	3.64	-	Union of Sardinians & allies	37,356	4.39	2	2
Gavino Sale	18,638	1.95	-	Independence Republic of Sardinia	9,724	1.36	0	-
Total candidates	972,981	100.00	9	Total parties	849,004	100.00	76	85

Source: Regional Council of Sardinia
