= Francesca Barracciu =

Italian politician (born 1966)

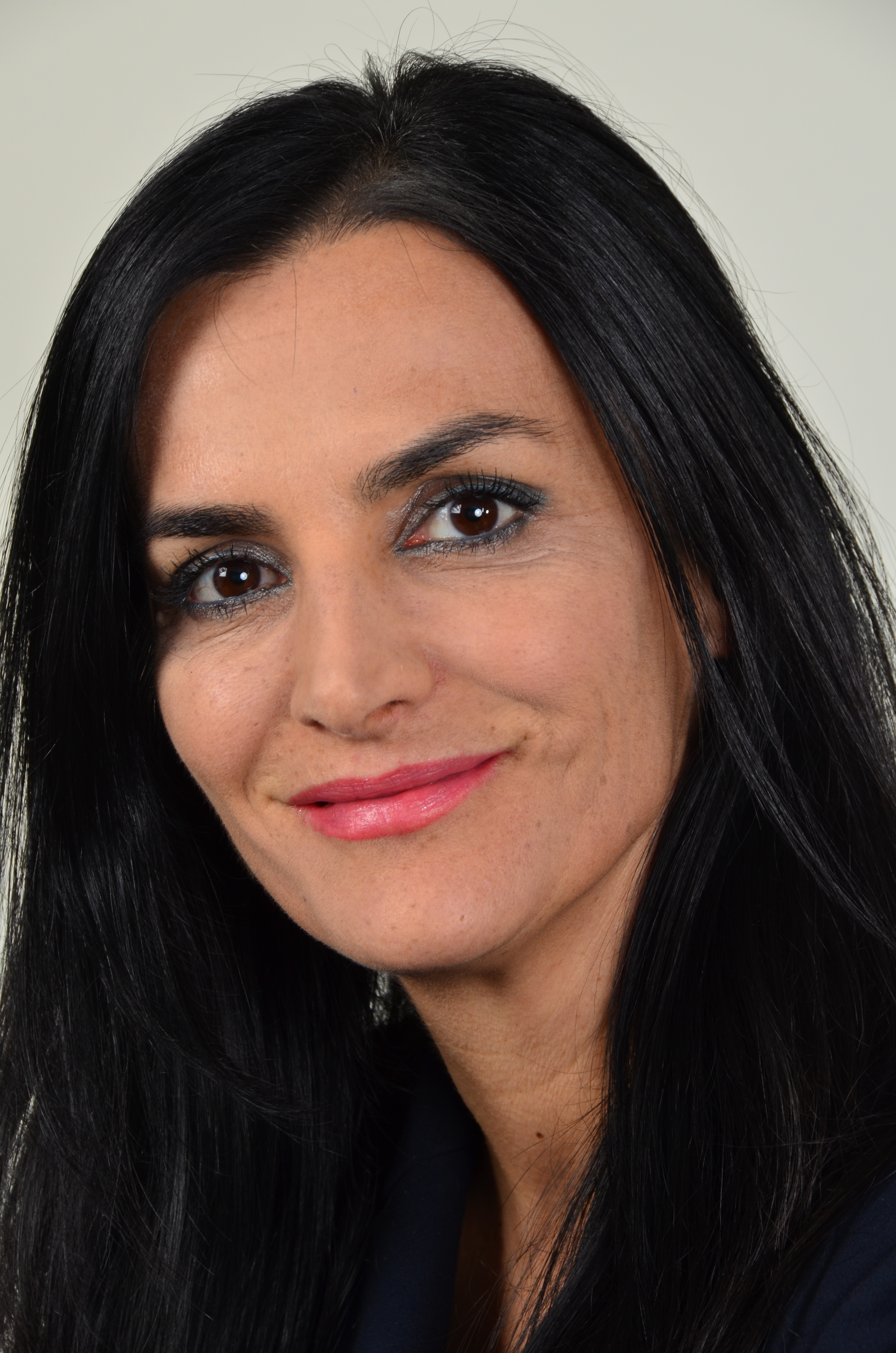
- Barracciu in February 2014

Member of the European Parliament
- In office 2012–2014

Personal details
- Born: 11 June 1966 (age 59) Sorgono, Italy
- Party: IV (since 2019)
- Other political affiliations: PCI (1986–1991); PDS (199–-1998); DS (1998–2007); PD (2007–2019)

Francesca Barracciu (born 11 June 1966) is an Italian politician. She was the mayor of Sorgono from 2005 to 2010, and was the Undersecretary of State at the Ministry of Cultural Heritage and Activities and Tourism in the Renzi Cabinet from 2014 to 2015. From 2012 to 2014, she was also a member of the European Parliament (MEP).

== Early life and career ==
Born in Sorgono, Barracciu graduated in philosophy and pedagogy. She was a teacher of literary and Latin subjects at high schools, as well as a consultant for cultural activities at public and private institutions.

== Politics ==
Barracciu entered politics in the 1980s, militating in the Italian Communist Party (PCI). In the 1990s, she joined the PCI's legal successors parties, the Democratic Party of the Left (PDS) and then the Democrats of the Left (DS). A member of the Democratic Party (PD) since its foundation in 2007, she was regional secretary of Sardinian PD from July to December 2008. She has been assessor and municipal councilor of the municipality of Sorgono, as mayor of the same municipality from 2005 to 2010 (elected with 100% as the only candidate); she also was Regional Councilor of Sardinia from 2004 to 2013. In 2009, Barracciu ran for the European Parliament in the ranks of the PD in the Italian Islands constituency and obtained 116,844 preferences, making her the first of the non-elected, and then taking over from Rosario Crocetta on 17 December 2012, after his resignation for the election as president of Sicily.

On 29 September 2013, Barracciu won the centre-left coalition primary election in the first round ahead of the 2014 Sardinian regional election with 44.3% of the vote and 22,808 preferences. On 30 December 2013, after some pressure from members of her party, she renounced to participate in the electoral competition, as she was investigated in the investigation into the expenses abuse of funds to regional groups, and was therefore replaced by economist Francesco Pigliaru, later elected president of Sardinia.

On 28 February 2014, Barracciu was appointed Undersecretary of State at the Ministry of Cultural Heritage and Activities and Tourism led by the minister Dario Franceschini, resigning as MEP, ratified on 11 March 2014. Her appointment caused serious perplexity as Matteo Renzi himself, at the time new secretary of PD, asked Barracciu to renounce the race as a centre-left coalition candidate for the presidency of Sardinia despite the victory in the primary, two months from the vote, because investigated for the use of regional funds. Renzi and the Minister of Reforms Maria Elena Boschi defended the appointment of Barracciu, and other undersecretaries under investigation, reiterating that the guarantee notice should not be judged as a definitive sentence.

In 2015, Barracciu ran for city councilor in Sorgono in support of the mayoral candidate Vincenzo Rodi and his list A Future for Sorgono. The list was not successful, as the left-wing civic list candidate and CGIL trade unionist Giovanni Arru was elected mayor, and his Unita Mente list obtained 68% (789 votes), surpassing Rodi stopped at 33% with 372 votes; with 88 votes, Barracciu with 88 votes was the most voted on the losing list after the mayoral candidate by entering the city council.

In November 2019, Barracciu left the PD and joined new Renzi's political party Italia Viva (IV).

== Judicial proceedings ==
In September 2013, Barracciu was entered in the register of suspects together with 33 other exponents. In December 2013, Barracciu, who was the then MEP and candidate for governor was heard by the prosecutor Marco Cocco to answer for the failure to report on expenses made by the regional council group between February 2006 and January 2009, for a total of thirty-three thousand euros in mileage reimbursements for fuel.

On 21 October 2015, Barracciu was indicted on charges of having used public funds for purposes other than those envisaged, for an amount of approximately 81,000 euros, during her mandate as regional councilor of Sardinia from 2004 to 2013. Barracciu has announced her resignation as Undersecretary for Culture and Tourism of the Renzi government.

On 5 December 2017, the Court of Cagliari sentenced Barracciu to 4 years of imprisonment for aggravated embezzlement in the context of the scandal on funds destined for groups of the Regional Council of Sardinia and spent for non-institutional purposes. The total expenditure declared was around 80,000 euros. In May 2019, the Cagliari Court of Appeal sentenced her to 3 years, 3 months, and twenty days in prison.
