= Sardigna Natzione Indipendentzia =

- Leader: Bustianu Cumpostu
- Founded: 1994
- Headquarters: corso Garibaldi 108; 08100 Nuoro
- Newspaper: Indipendentzia.sar
- Ideology: Sardinian nationalism Separatism; Socialism
- Political position: Left-wing

Website
- http://www.sardignanatzione.it

Sardigna Natzione Indipendentzia ("For the Independence of the Sardinian Nation"), also known as Sardigna Natzione or SN, is a minor separatist and socialist political party in Sardinia, Italy. Its long-time leader is Bustianu Cumpostu.

== History ==
The party was founded by Anghelu Caria in 1994, in continuity with the Independentist Sardinian Party (PSIn), of which Caria had been founder and leader. After Caria's sudden death, Bustianu Cumpostu was elected new leader by defeating Gavino Sale, who would lead the party's left-wing faction for five years, before leaving in 2001.

In the 1996 general election SN won 4.3% in single-seat constituencies (11.6% in Tortolì and 9.6% in Iglesias), despite being present only in ten constituencies out of fourteen, and 2.3% for proportional representation, due to competition from the Sardinian Action Party (PSd'Az), which gained 3.8%.

In the 1999 Sardinian regional election SN had its best result ever, as Cumpostu received 5.8% of the vote for president, while the PSd'Az gained 8.3% with Franco Meloni. However, as Cumpostu did not surpass the 6% threshold and the party list stopped at 1.8%, the party did not get into the Regional Council.

Both for the 2001 general election and the 2004 regional election SN formed an alliance with the PSd'Az. This led Sale, who refused any collaboration with not parties being considered not fully committed to independence, and his faction to leave the party in 2001 to form Independence Republic of Sardinia (iRS). In the election the Sardist electorate was very fragmented (also because of the presence of the Union of Sardinians, UDS, which ran on a "nationalist" platform) and most of SN former voters voted Sale for President (1.9%) and the iRS party list (0.7%), while only a minority voted for SN (0.4%).

SN won 1.1% of the vote in the 2006 general election and 0.7% in 2008. In the 2009 regional election the party formed a "nationalist" left-wing alliance with A Manca pro s'Indipendèntzia, a communist party, and other minor separatist groups, but gained only 0.5%, while Sale (iRS) 3.1%.

In the 2014 regional election the party unsuccessfully sought to join the coalition led by Michela Murgia (centred on Project Republic of Sardinia), in list with alike separatist parties, and finally decided not to take part to the election.

== Popular support ==
The electoral results of SN in Sardinia since 1994 are shown in the table below.

1994 regional	1996 general	1999 regional	1999 European	2001 general	2004 European	2004 regional	2006 general	2008 general	2009 regional	2009 European	2013 general	2014 regional	2014 European
1.2	2.3	1.8	-	-	-	0.4	1.1	0.7	0.5	-	-	-	-

== Leadership ==
- Coordinator: Anghelu Caria (1994–1996), Bustianu Cumpostu (1996–present)
