= 2010 Sardinian provincial elections =

The 2010 provincial elections of Sardinia took place on 30–31 May 2010. A run-off took place in Cagliari, Nuoro and Ogliastra on 12–13 June.

Six provinces were won by the centre-left, two by the centre-right, which gained Olbia-Tempio.

== Results ==
=== Presidents ===
	The People of Freedom and allies			Democratic Party and allies			Independence Republic of Sardinia			Others
	candidate	1st round	2nd round	candidate	1st round	2nd round	candidate	1st round	2nd round	1st round
Cagliari	Giuseppe Farris (The People of Freedom); Piergiorgio Massidda (The People of Freedom)	46.5% 9.0%	47.6%	Graziano Milia (Democratic Party); Federico Palomba (Italy of Values)	33.8% 6.6%	52.4%	Ornella Demuru (IRS)	2.7%	-	1.4%
Carbonia-Iglesias	Giuseppe Madeddu (The People of Freedom)	45.2%	-	Salvatore Cherchi (Democratic Party)	50.4%	-	Giovannino Sedda (IRS)	2.9%	-	1.5%
Medio Campidano	Efisio Meloni (The People of Freedom); Onorato Serra (Fortza Paris)	39.4% 1.7%	-	Fulvio Tocco (Democratic Party)	55.1%	-	Gabriele Littera (IRS)	2.9%	-	2.6%
Nuoro	Luigi Crisponi (Sardinian Reformers)	38.4%	48.7%	Roberto Deriu (Democratic Party); Efisio Arbau (Democratic Party)	32.5% 23.9%	51.3%	Salvatore Bussa (IRS)	4.4%	-	0.8%
Ogliastra	Sandro Rubiu (The People of Freedom); Gianfranco Lecca (New PSI); Giorgio Ladu (Lega Nord Sardinia)	43.8% 8.9% 3.0%	49.0%	Bruno Pilia (Democratic Party)	41.1%	51.0%	Nicola Cantalupo (IRS)	3.3%	-	0.0%
Olbia-Tempio	Fedele Sanciu (The People of Freedom); Vittorio Chirco (Lega Nord Sardinia)	53.2% 1.6%	-	Gesuino Achenza (Democratic Party); Anna Murrighile (Alliance for Italy)	39.3% 3.6%	-	Gianmaria Bellu (IRS)	2.3%	-	0.0%
Oristano	Massimiliano De Seneen (The People of Freedom)	59.7%	-	Gian Mario Tendas (Democratic Party); Ivano Cuccu (Christian Popular Union)	29.7% 3.1%	-	Sebastian Madau (IRS)	5.9%	-	1.6%
Sassari	Mariano Mameli (The People of Freedom); Luigi Todini (Lega Nord Sardinia)	41.1% 0.8%	-	Alessandra Giudici (Democratic Party)	50.7%		Gavino Sale (IRS)	6.5%	-	0.9%

Source: Ministry of the Interior

=== Parties ===
Province	UdC	PdL	LNS	MpA	UDS	FP	RS	PSdAz	RM	IRS	ParIS	UPC	IdV	PD	PSI	SEL	PRC
Cagliari	7.6	15.7	0.4	2.7	3.8	1.8	7.3	6.4	3.1	2.7	0.3	0.4	6.1	19.9	0.9	4.4	3.3
Carbonia-Iglesias	19.0	14.3	-	-	-	-	7.1	4.4	2.3	3.1	-	-	4.9	19.7	6.4	3.7	3.3
Medio Campidano	6.8	15.5	-	-	-	1.7	4.7	5.3	7.1	2.9	0.7	3.2	6.4	23.9	4.0	2.4	7.9
Nuoro	6.4	10.8	-	-	2.1	-	6.7	12.8	4.2	4.2	-	1.4	3.6	15.9	4.4	4.0	3.5
Ogliastra	12.3	20.9	2.9	3.2	-	1.9	5.1	4.8	1.4	3.3	-	2.2	6.0	20.2	2.0	2.0	3.1
Olbia-Tempio	9.7	21.8	1.5	-	-	-	8.9	6.7	2.4	2.2	-	6.2	7.4	21.0	-	-	2.5
Oristano	12.0	17.5	-	6.8	-	9.9	9.0	5.2	0.4	5.8	0.8	3.1	5.7	18.9	-	2.0	2.3
Sassari	8.2	16.7	0.9	3.6	2.5	-	3.4	6.9	-	5.8	0.4	10.7	9.2	21.6	-	-	5.1

Source: Ministry of the Interior
