= Independence Republic of Sardinia =

Independence Republic of Sardinia Indipendèntzia Repùbrica de Sardigna
- President: Gavino Sale
- Founded: 2002
- Headquarters: Sassari, Sardinia, Italy
- Newspaper: Repubrica de Sardigna
- Ideology: Regionalism; Sardinian nationalism Left-wing nationalism Social democracy Separatism
- Political position: Left-wing
- National affiliation: The Other Europe (2014)
- Regional affiliation: Est Ora (with ProgReS and Torra)

Website
- www.irsonline.net

Independence Republic of Sardinia (Sardinian: Indipendèntzia Repùbrica de Sardigna, iRS) is a regionalist, Sardinian nationalist, left-wing nationalist, social-democratic and non-violent separatist political party in Sardinia. The party, whose long-time leader has been Gavino Sale, supports the establishment of a "Republic of Sardinia" and its independence from Italy.

== History ==
=== Early years ===
The party emerged in 2001–2002 by the merger of Su Cuncordu, a separatist platform animated by three Sardinian intellectuals living in Rome (Franciscu Sedda, Frantziscu Sanna and Franciscu Pala), and a splinter group from Sardigna Natzione Indipendentzia (SNI) led by Gavino Sale. The latter and his followers had left SNI because of its alliance with the Sardinian Action Party (PSd'Az), which did not support independentism fully at the time and was engaged in alliances with Italian parties.

=== Electoral successes ===
As soon as in 2004 (when Sale won 1.9% of the vote in the regional election) iRS absorbed virtually all the voters of SNI, thanks to the charismatic leadership of Sale, a more coherent and intransigent secessionist platform and a more centrist political position. In the 2006 general election iRS won 1.1% of the vote in Sardinia, while it chose to boycott the 2008 general election in order not to be partner in crime with the Italian political system.

At the 2009 regional election Gavino Sale won 3.1% of the vote (4.2% in the Province of Oristano and 3.3% in the Province of Sassari, where the party had its early strongholds) as candidate for President of the Region, while the party stopped at 2.1%, short of the 3% threshold needed to enter the Regional Council.

At the 2010 provincial elections iRS candidates for president gained more than 2% of the vote in all the provinces and the party obtained its best result ever. Notably, Sale won 6.5% in Sassari (party list: 5.8%), Sebastian Madau 5.9% (5.8%) in Oristano and Salvatore Bussa 4.4% (4.2%) in Nuoro.

=== Internal splits ===
In January 2010, during a party congress, Ornella Demuru was elected secretary of the party, replacing Gavino Sale, who was elected president, and representing a power shift within the party from the old guard and younger activists. Notwithstanding the good results of the party at the 2010 provincial elections, the relation between Sale and Demuru was tense from the beginning. In October Demuru threatened her resignation and reclaimed more internal democracy within the party. Sale, for his part, replied that he rejected an intellectual-chic party as that imagined by Demuru and her supporters, who included the three founding members Franciscu Sedda, Frantziscu Sanna and Franciscu Pala, plus younger intellectuals such as Michela Murgia. During a grassroots' meeting on 12 December, Sale accused Demuru and the young guard of conspiring against him and, after this accusation, he was expelled from the party by the executive composed by Demuru's loyalists.

By the end of December Sale was sure to have won the power struggle and suspended the members of the executive who had expelled him. A few days later, on 2 January 2010, the group of Demuru and Sedda finally decided to leave the party and launch a "Republican Constituent Assembly" (Sa Costituente Repubricana). In February the new party took the name of Project Republic of Sardinia (ProgReS). Moreover, on 10 February, Claudia Zuncheddu left the Red Moors, party of which she was president, and joined iRS. Zuncheddu was a regional councillor, thus the party was represented in the Council for the first time. In May 2011 Zuncheddu ran for Mayor of Cagliari and gained a mere 2.4% of the vote, but better than Demuru, who stopped at 0.4%. Zunchedda would later form her own party, Free Sardinia.

=== Alliances ===
In the 2014 regional election the party chose to join forces with the Italian centre-left for the first time (whose candidate, Francesco Pigliaru, was elected President), instead of forming a coalition with other independentist parties. Consequently, iRS lost much of his electoral support and won a mere 0.8% of the vote (compared to the ProgReS-led coalition's 10.8%), but, thanks to the alliance, Sale was elected to the Regional Council. It was the first time that the iRs was able to elect a regional councillor on its own, but it lasted just a year: in July 2015 the Council of State invalidated the election of four councillors, including Sale.

In the 2019 regional election the party formed a joint list with the Red Moors and SNI named "Self-determination" and obtained 1.9% of the vote.

In 2021 the party entered in a federative pact named Est Ora (It's Time) with ProgReS and a brand new group named Torra (Again).

In the 2024 regional election formed a joint list with ProgReS and obtained 1.6% of the vote and no seats in the Regional Council.

== Leadership ==
- President: Gavino Sale (2010–present)
- Secretary: Gavino Sale (2002–2010), Ornella Demuru (2010–2011)

== See also ==
- Sardinian nationalism
