= Shared Horizon =

Shared Horizon Orizzonte Comune
- Leader: Franco Cuccureddu
- Founded: 7 July 2023
- Ideology: Regionalism
- Political position: Centre
- National affiliation: South calls North
- Regional affiliation: Centre-left coalition
- Regional Council of Sardinia: 3 / 60

Website
- https://www.orizzontecomune.com/

Shared Horizon (Italian: Orizzonte Comune, abbr. OC) is a regionalist political party active in Sardinia, led by Franco Cuccureddu.

Countrywide, OC is aligned with South calls North, led by Cateno De Luca.

Cuccureddu, who had previously been a leading member and deputy secretary of the Movement for the Autonomies, a regional councillor in 2009–2014 and the leader of Civic Sardinia (which had taken part to the 2019 regional election within the centre-right coalition, obtaining 1.6% of the vote and one seat), launched the new party and announced that it would be part of the centre-left coalition.

In the 2024 regional election, OC won 3.0% of the vote and three seats in the Regional Council of Sardinia, for Cuccureddu, Sandro Porcu and Salvatore Cau. After the election, in which the centre-left candidate Alessandra Todde of the Five Star Movement was narrowly elected president of Sardinia, Cuccureddu was appointed regional minister of Tourism, Craftmanship and Commerce in the new regional government. Lorenzo Cozzolino, a member of the PSI, has also joined the council group.

== Election results ==
=== European Parliament ===
Election	Leader	Votes	%	Seats	+/–	EP Group
2024	Franco Cuccureddu	Into Freedom		0 / 76	New	–

=== Regional elections ===
Election	Votes	%	Seats	+/–
2024	20,824	3.0	3 / 60	New
