= 2024 Sardinian regional election =

Local election in Italy

- 25 February 2024

All 60 seats to the Regional Council of Sardinia
- Turnout: 52.4% (▼1.4%)
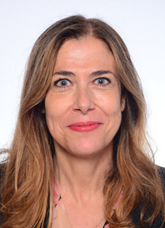

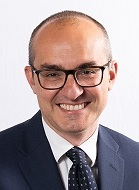
	Majority party	Minority party
Candidate	Alessandra Todde	Paolo Truzzu
Party	Five Star Movement	Brothers of Italy
Alliance	Centre-left	Centre-right
Seats won	36	24
Seat change	▲12	▼12
Popular vote	334,160	331,099
Percentage	45.4%	45.0%
Swing	▲1.3%	▼2.8%
President before election
Christian Solinas
PSd'Az
Elected President
Alessandra Todde
M5S

The 2024 Sardinian regional election took place in Italy's Sardinia region on 25 February 2024. The election was for all 60 elected seats of the Regional Council of Sardinia, as well as the president of Sardinia, who automatically became a member of the Regional Council. The election was won by Alessandra Todde, who also became the first female president of Sardina. It was the first election of the 2024 Italian regional elections.

A member of the Five Star Movement, Todde led the centre-left coalition to a narrow win at 45.4% over the centre-right coalition and Brothers of Italy candidate Paolo Truzzu at 45.0%, with Renato Soru finishing a distant third at 8.7%. It was the first time since the 2015 Campania regional election that the centre-left coalition unseated a centre-right coalition regional president. Although Truzzu was not the incumbent president, having taken the place of Christian Solinas, the incumbent president since 2019 and member of the Sardinian Action Party, which is nationally allied with the League and affiliated to the centre-right coalition, it was still the centre-left coalition's first regional gain since 2015. It was the first election since the 2018 Lazio regional election where the winner of the presidential election did not win the plurality in the party vote due to split-ticket voting.

== Background ==
The election in Sardinia was called for 25 February 2024. In November 2023, the Democratic Party (PD) and the Five Star Movement (M5S) announced Alessandra Todde, former undersecretary at the Ministry for Economic Development during the second Conte government, as joint candidate for the centre-left coalition. Disappointment regarding the agreement between PD and M5S emerged among potential coalition partners, such Italia Viva and More Europe, who had always been sceptical about cooperation with M5S; dissent also came from within the party, with Renato Soru, former president of Sardinia, criticising the decision to not hold an internal primary to choose the candidate. These disagreements led Soru to formalize his candidacy as independent less than a week later, immediately obtaining the support of More Europe and Christian Popular Union, and later joined also by Action, the Communist Refoundation Party, a list of PD dissidents, and a coalition of independentist movements.

The centre-right coalition faced internal divisions, with the incumbent president Christian Solinas seeking re-election with the support of the Sardinian Action Party (PSd'Az) and the League (Lega) but without the support of Brothers of Italy (FdI), whose regional coordinator had urging for a change of direction. During a meeting on 4 January 2024, a majority of the coalition members opted for Paolo Truzzu (FdI), the incumbent mayor of Cagliari, as candidate for the presidency, resulting in Solinas and the parties supporting his bid considering to break away from the coalition.

Coalition talks to reach a deal over a unitary candidacy went on unsuccessfully for a couple of weeks; the sudden news of Solinas being under investigation for corruption decreased significantly his chances of being a feasible candidate. The corruption charges, together with the other coalition partner's will to compromise with the League on other regional candidacies and on the introduction of a third mandate for regional governors, ultimately led the party to announcing its support to Truzzu's candidacy on 19 January 2014. Shortly after Lega's announcement, Solinas officially withdrew himself from the race, with PSd'Az choosing to endorse Truzzu.

The fourth candidate to join the race was Lucia Chessa, leader of the regionalist party Red Moors. Interest in running for the presidency was also expressed by Maria Rosaria Randaccio, with the support of the two Eurosceptic and anti-establishment movements Force of the People and Sardinia Free Zone; her bid was rejected by the electoral authority due to failing to gather the necessary signatures to take part in the election.

== Election system ==
The candidate who obtains a plurality of the votes is elected president of Sardinia. If the elected candidate obtains at least 25% of the votes, the majority of the seats on the board are guaranteed on the lists who support them. The Sardinian electoral law provides for a single round, with a list vote, the possibility of expressing a preference within the chosen list, and voting for the presidential candidate, on a single card. It is possible to vote for a list and for a candidate who is not connected to each other (Article 9). The candidate who has obtained the relative majority is elected president (Article 1, paragraph 4). To the lists connected to the president-elect, a majority prize may be awarded in the following measure: 60% of the seats if the president-elect obtained a percentage of preference above 40%; 55% of the seats if the elected president has obtained a percentage of preferences between 25% and 40%, while no majority prize is awarded if the president is elected with less than 25% (Article 13). The law provides for a 10% threshold for coalitions, and 5% for non-coalitized lists (Article 1, paragraph 7). No barriers are foreseen for the lists within the coalitions that have exceeded 10%.

== Parties and candidates ==
Political party or alliance	Constituent lists	Previous result		Candidate
Political party or alliance	Constituent lists	Votes (%)	Seats	Candidate
Centre-right coalition	League Sardinia (Lega)	11.4	8	Paolo Truzzu
Centre-right coalition	Sardinian Action Party (PSd'Az)	9.9	8	Paolo Truzzu
Centre-right coalition	Forza Italia (FI)	8.0	5	Paolo Truzzu
Centre-right coalition	Sardinian Reformers (RS)	5.1	4	Paolo Truzzu
Centre-right coalition	Brothers of Italy (FdI)	4.7	3	Paolo Truzzu
Centre-right coalition	Sardinia in the Centre 2020 (incl. IaC–NM, S20V)	4.1	3	Paolo Truzzu
Centre-right coalition	Union of the Centre (UdC)	3.8	3	Paolo Truzzu
Centre-right coalition	Sardinia Alliance – PLI	—N/a	—N/a	Paolo Truzzu
Centre-right coalition	Christian Democracy with Rotondi (DCR)	—N/a	—N/a	Paolo Truzzu
Centre-left coalition	Democratic Party (PD)	13.5	8	Alessandra Todde
Centre-left coalition	Five Star Movement (M5S) (incl. AI! and GP)	9.7	6	Alessandra Todde
Centre-left coalition	Progressives – The Base (P–LB)	3.2	2	Alessandra Todde
Centre-left coalition	Fortza Paris (FP)	1.6	1	Alessandra Todde
Centre-left coalition	Italian Socialist Party – SiE (PSI–SiE)	1.2	0	Alessandra Todde
Centre-left coalition	Solidary Democracy (DemoS) (incl. S50)	—N/a	—N/a	Alessandra Todde
Centre-left coalition	Future Left (SF) (incl. OS)	—N/a	—N/a	Alessandra Todde
Centre-left coalition	Greens and Left Alliance (incl. EV, SI, Pos, SS)	—N/a	—N/a	Alessandra Todde
Centre-left coalition	Shared Horizon (OC) (incl. ScN)	—N/a	—N/a	Alessandra Todde
Centre-left coalition	United Civic List for Todde President	—N/a	—N/a	Alessandra Todde
Sardinian Coalition	Action – More Europe – LDE – UPC (incl. IV)	—N/a	—N/a	Renato Soru
Sardinian Coalition	Communist Refoundation Party (PRC)	—N/a	—N/a	Renato Soru
Sardinian Coalition	Vote Sardinia (incl. iRS, ProgReS, ScS)	—N/a	—N/a	Renato Soru
Sardinian Coalition	Sardinia Project (PS)	—N/a	—N/a	Renato Soru
Sardinian Coalition	Liberu	—N/a	—N/a	Renato Soru
Sardigna R-Esiste (incl. Red Moors)		—N/a	—N/a	Lucia Chessa

== Debates ==
2024 Sardinian election debates
Date	Organizers	Moderators	P Present N Not present				Sources
Date	Organizers	Moderators	Truzzu	Todde	Soru	Chessa	Sources
1 February 2024	Rai 3	Maria Spigonardo	P	P	P	P	
7 February 2024	Diocese of Nuoro	Antonio Mura	P	P	P	P	
9 February 2024	Coldiretti	Battista Cualbu	P	P	P	N	

== Opinion polls ==
Date	Polling firm	Truzzu	Todde	Soru	Chessa	Lead
20–22 Feb 2024	BiDiMedia	44.1	43.7	11.2	1.0	0.4
31 Jan–1 Feb 2024	BiDiMedia	46.0	41.9	11.9	0.6	4.1

=== Political parties ===
Date	Polling firm	Centre-right									Centre-left										Sardinian coalition					SRE	Others	Lead
Date	Polling firm	FdI	Lega–Sardegna	PSd'Az	FI	RS	SaC 20V	UdC	SA–PLI	DcR	PD	M5S	UpAT	AVS+	P–LB	SF	OC	PSI	FP	Demos	Action+	PS	Liberu	VS	PRC	SRE	Others	Lead
31 Jan–1 Feb 2024	BiDiMedia	23.1	6.4	5.4	4.1	3.3	2.9	1.9	0.8	0.6	15.6	10.0	3.4	3.4	2.9	2.2	1.9	0.8	0.5	0.4	3.7	3.5	1.2	0.8	0.6	0.8	—N/a	7.5
Oct 2023	Piepoli	17.5	8	7	7	—N/a					15	17	—N/a	1	1	—N/a		1	—N/a	1	—N/a					—N/a	5.3	0.7

=== Approval ratings ===
Christian Solinas
Date	Polling firm	Approve	Disapprove	Undecided
Lab2101	8–13 Dec 2023	50	50	
Lab2101	Aug 2023	49.8	50.2	
Noto	Jul 2023	35	65	
SWG	May 2023	20	80	
Lab2101	10–23 Aug 2022	53.6	46.4	
Noto	Jul 2022	39.5	60.5	
SWG	May 2022	28	72	
Lab2101	25-29 Apr 2022	54.3	45.7	
Lab2101	19-22 Dec 2021	57.9	42.1	
Noto	Jul 2021	43	57	
Noto	Jul 2020	48	52	

== Results ==
25 February 2024 Sardinia regional election results
Candidates	Votes	%	Seats	Parties	Votes	%	Seats
Alessandra Todde	334,160	45.4	1	Democratic Party	95,285	13.8	11
Alessandra Todde	334,160	45.4	1	Five Star Movement	53,613	7.8	7
Alessandra Todde	334,160	45.4	1	Greens and Left Alliance	32,145	4.7	4
Alessandra Todde	334,160	45.4	1	United for Alessandra Todde	27,422	4.0	3
Alessandra Todde	334,160	45.4	1	Shared Horizon	20,984	3.0	3
Alessandra Todde	334,160	45.4	1	Progressive Party	20,868	3.0	3
Alessandra Todde	334,160	45.4	1	Future Left	20,574	3.0	3
Alessandra Todde	334,160	45.4	1	Italian Socialist Party – SIE	11,637	1.7	1
Alessandra Todde	334,160	45.4	1	Fortza Paris	6,068	0.9	–
Alessandra Todde	334,160	45.4	1	Solidary Democracy	4,692	0.7	–
Alessandra Todde	334,160	45.4	1	Total	293,288	42.5	36
Paolo Truzzu	331,099	45.0	1	Brothers of Italy	93,921	13.6	7
Paolo Truzzu	331,099	45.0	1	Sardinian Reformers	49,629	7.2	3
Paolo Truzzu	331,099	45.0	1	Forza Italia	43,892	6.4	3
Paolo Truzzu	331,099	45.0	1	Sardinia in the Centre 2020	37,950	5.5	3
Paolo Truzzu	331,099	45.0	1	Sardinian Action Party	37,341	5.4	3
Paolo Truzzu	331,099	45.0	1	Sardinia Alliance – PLI	28,203	4.1	2
Paolo Truzzu	331,099	45.0	1	League Sardinia	25,957	3.8	1
Paolo Truzzu	331,099	45.0	1	Union of the Centre	19,237	2.8	1
Paolo Truzzu	331,099	45.0	1	Christian Democracy with Rotondi	2,110	0.3	–
Paolo Truzzu	331,099	45.0	1	Total	333,873	48.4	23
Renato Soru	63,666	8.7	–	Sardinia Project	23,872	3.5	–
Renato Soru	63,666	8.7	–	Vote Sardinia	10,830	1.6	–
Renato Soru	63,666	8.7	–	Action – More Europe – LDE – UPC	10,577	1.5	–
Renato Soru	63,666	8.7	–	Liberu	4,993	0.7	–
Renato Soru	63,666	8.7	–	Communist Refoundation Party	4,534	0.7	–
Renato Soru	63,666	8.7	–	Total	54,569	7.9	–
Lucia Chessa	7,261	1.0	–	Sardigna R-Esiste (incl. Red Moors)	4,067	0.6	–
Invalid votes	21,412	–					
Total candidates	736,186	100.00	2	Total parties	690.401	100.00	58
Registered voters	1,447,753						
Source: Autonomous Region of Sardinia – Results

Popular vote
PD	13.8%
FdI	13.6%
M5S	7.8%
RS	7.2%
FI	6.4%
SaC	5.5%
PSd'Az	5.4%
AVS	4.7%
AS–PLI	4.1%
UpT	4.0%
Lega	3.8%
PS	3.5%
OC	3.0%
PP	3.0%
SF	3.0%
UDC	2.8%
Others	8.7%

President
Todde	45.4%
Truzzu	45.0%
Soru	8.6%
Chessa	1.0%

=== Voter turnout ===
Region	Time		
Region	12:00	19:00	22:00
Sardinia	18.4%	44.1%	52.4%
Province	Time		
Province	12:00	19:00	22:00
Cagliari	19.4%	43.8%	52.5%
Nuoro	19.5%	47.9%	56.4%
Oristano	17%	43.1%	51.1%
Sassari	17.9%	45.5%	53.8%
Medio Campidano	16.4%	39.9%	48%
Carbonia Iglesias	18%	42.2%	49.6%
Ogliastra	17.5%	43.6%	53%
Olbia Tempio	17.9%	43.5%	51.2%
Source: Intenzioni di voto
