= 2006 Italian general election in Sardinia =

The Italian general election of 2006 took place on 10–11 April 2006.

The election was won in Sardinia by the centre-left The Union, which prevailed also nationally.

== Results ==
=== Chamber of Deputies ===
Coalitions leaders	votes	votes (%)	seats	Parties	votes	votes (%)	seats
Romano Prodi	550,889	52.5	10	The Olive Tree: Democracy is Freedom – The Daisy; Democrats of the Left	349,259	33.3	6
Romano Prodi	550,889	52.5	10	Communist Refoundation Party	69,895	6.7	1
Romano Prodi	550,889	52.5	10	Party of Italian Communists	34,200	3.3	1
Romano Prodi	550,889	52.5	10	Rose in the Fist: Italian Democratic Socialists; Italian Radicals	28,808	2.7	1
Romano Prodi	550,889	52.5	10	Italy of Values	24,236	2.3	1
Romano Prodi	550,889	52.5	10	Populars–UDEUR	23,827	2.3	-
Romano Prodi	550,889	52.5	10	Federation of the Greens	13,552	1.3	-
Romano Prodi	550,889	52.5	10	Pensioners' Party	7,115	0.7	-
Silvio Berlusconi	475,966	45.4	8	Forza Italia	236,679	22.6	4
Silvio Berlusconi	475,966	45.4	8	National Alliance	135,247	12.9	2
Silvio Berlusconi	475,966	45.4	8	Union of Christian and Centre Democrats	80,877	7.7	2
Silvio Berlusconi	475,966	45.4	8	Social Alternative	7,828	0.7	-
Silvio Berlusconi	475,966	45.4	8	Christian Democracy–Socialist Party	6,246	0.6	-
Silvio Berlusconi	475,966	45.4	8	others	9,089	0.9	-
Gavino Sale	11,648	1.1	-	Independence Republic of Sardinia	11,648	1.1	-
Bastianu Cumpostu	11,000	1.1	-	Sardinia Nation	11,000	1.1	-
Total coalitions	1,049,503	100.0	18	Total parties	1,049,503	100.0	18

Source: Ministry of the Interior

=== Senate ===
Coalitions leaders	votes	votes (%)	seats	Parties	votes	votes (%)	seats
Romano Prodi	482,668	50.9	5	Democrats of the Left	162,798	17.2	2
Romano Prodi	482,668	50.9	5	Democracy is Freedom – The Daisy	119,084	12.6	1
Romano Prodi	482,668	50.9	5	Communist Refoundation Party	77,870	8.2	1
Romano Prodi	482,668	50.9	5	Together with the Union: Federation of the Greens; Party of Italian Communists	41,847	4.4	1
Romano Prodi	482,668	50.9	5	Italy of Values	28,211	3.0	-
Romano Prodi	482,668	50.9	5	Rose in the Fist: Italian Democratic Socialists; Italian Radicals	23,545	2.5	-
Romano Prodi	482,668	50.9	5	Populars–UDEUR	21,509	2.3	-
Romano Prodi	482,668	50.9	5	Pensioners' Party	7,804	0.8	-
Silvio Berlusconi	429,731	45.3	4	Forza Italia	215,516	22.7	2
Silvio Berlusconi	429,731	45.3	4	National Alliance	122,697	12.9	1
Silvio Berlusconi	429,731	45.3	4	Union of Christian and Centre Democrats	73,673	7.8	1
Silvio Berlusconi	429,731	45.3	4	Social Alternative	6,120	0.7	-
Silvio Berlusconi	429,731	45.3	4	Christian Democracy–Socialist Party	5,920	0.6	-
Silvio Berlusconi	429,731	45.3	4	others	5,805	0.6	-
Antonio Delitalia	16,733	1.8	-	Sardinian Action Party	16,733	1.8	-
Gavino Sale	10,881	1.2	-	Independence Republic of Sardinia	10,881	1.2	-
Bastianu Cumpostu	8,412	0.9	-	Sardinia Nation	8,412	0.9	-
Total coalitions	948,425	100.0	9	Total parties	948,425	100.0	9

Source: Ministry of the Interior
