= A Manca pro s'Indipendèntzia =

- Leader: Bruno Bellomonte
- Founded: July 2004
- Dissolved: 2015
- Ideology: Sardinian nationalism Separatism; Communism
- Coalition: Unidade Indipendentista

Website
- http://www.manca-indipendentzia.org/

A Manca pro s'Indipendentzia (aMpI, "To the Left for Independence" ) was a separatist and communist political party in Sardinia. Founded in July 2004, the party's goals were to make Sardinia gain its independence from the Roman rule, start a communist revolution, adopt the Sardinian language as official and de-militarize the island. Some of its members have been accused of terrorism, but there was little, if any, evidence that they were actually terrorists.

For the 2009 regional election the party formed a joint list, "Unidade Indipendentista", with the more established Sardigna Natzione Indipendentzia and other minor separatist groups, gaining only 0.5% of the vote and no seats in the Regional Council of Sardinia.

In the 2014 regional election the party was the main member of the United Independentist Front, whose candidate, aMpI's Pier Franco Devias, won 1.0% of the vote and whose list 0.7%.

The party has been disbanded in 2015, with many of its members that flowed into Liberu - Liberos Rispetados Uguales. (Free Respected Equal).
