= Christian Solinas =

Italian politician

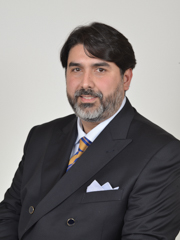

President of Sardinia
- In office 20 March 2019 – 20 March 2024
- Preceded by: Francesco Pigliaru
- Succeeded by: Alessandra Todde

Member of the Senate of the Republic
- In office 23 March 2018 – 19 June 2019
- Constituency: Sardinia

Personal details
- Born: 2 December 1976 (age 49) Cagliari, Italy
- Party: Sardinian Action Party
- Education: University of Sassari
- Occupation: Politician, Entrepreneur

Christian Solinas (born 2 December 1976) is an Italian politician, leader of the Sardinian Action Party and former President of Sardinia.

== Biography ==
Born in Cagliari, Solinas has been a long-time member of the Sardinian Action Party and has been regional councilor of transports from 2011 to 2014, under the presidency of Ugo Cappellacci.

In 2015, Solinas was elected Secretary of the Sardinian Action Party, leading the party towards right-wing positions, promoting a twinning with Matteo Salvini's Northern League. In the 2018 election, Solinas was elected to the Senate, becoming the only member of the Sardinian Action Party in the Senate and joining the League's parliamentary group.

Solinas graduated in Law at the University of Sassari in December 2018.

In November 2018, Solinas was appointed as the centre-right candidate for the office of President of Sardinia for the 2019 regional election, leading a coalition that includes the Sardinian Action Party, the League, Forza Italia, Brothers of Italy, the Union of the Centre, the Union of Sardinians, Fortza Paris, Energies for Italy and the Sardinian Reformers.

=== Legal proceedings ===
On Dec. 18, 2020, the Cagliari Public Prosecutor's Office issued a notice of conclusion of preliminary investigation against Solinas - in conjunction with other individuals - for the crimes of abuse of office and extortion, concluding the investigation phase that began in October 2019.

On Feb. 21, 2023, it was learned of a new investigation by the Cagliari Public Prosecutor's Office against Solinas and three other suspects on charges of bribery and money laundering and the seizure of telephones and computers. The matters under investigation concern the house bought by Solinas on Via dei Tritoni, a stone's throw from Cagliari's Poetto beach, and alleged pressure for Raimondi's appointment to the ENPI's top management. According to the hypothesis of prosecutor Pilia and the financiers, Solinas allegedly appointed Raimondi to the ENPI leadership in exchange for university lectures in Rome and Tirana and in exchange for an honorary degree in the Albanian Athenaeum. The Regional President's computer was not seized because he himself reportedly declared its theft the very day before the seizure order.
