= Unidos =

- President: Mauro Pili
- Founded: 18 October 2013
- Dissolved: 2020 ca.
- Split from: The People of Freedom
- Ideology: Regionalism; Sardinian nationalism Liberal conservatism Separatism
- Political position: Centre-right
- Regional Council: 0 / 60

Unidos (translation from Sardinian: "United") was a regionalist, Sardinian nationalist, liberal-conservative and separatist political party in Sardinia.

== History ==
The party was launched by Mauro Pili, a long-time member of centre-right Forza Italia and The People of Freedom and former president of Sardinia (1999, 2001–2003), in November 2011. Originally a faction within the PdL, Unidos soon became a party upon Pili's exit from that party in October 2013. As Pili had been elected to the Chamber of Deputies in the 2013 general election, Unidos was represented in Parliament until 2018.

In the 2014 regional election Pili ran for president and won 5.7% of the vote, while the party and a list named after the leader obtained 2.8% and 1.7% of the vote, respectively, both with no seats in the Regional Council.

In the 2019 regional election Pili stood again as a candidate for president, this time at the head of a joint list formed by Unidos, Project Republic of Sardinia (ProgReS) and minor groups. He won 2.3% of the vote, while the list stopped at 2.1%, resulting in no seats in the Regional Council.

After that, the party was no longer active.

== Electoral history ==
Latest election	# of overall votes	% of overall vote	# of overall seats won	+/–
2014	19,356	2.83	0 / 60	new
2019	15,234 (Note: Joint list with Project Republic of Sardinia and minor groups.)	2.13	0 / 60	=
