= Project Republic of Sardinia =

Project Republic of Sardinia Progetu Repùblica de Sardigna
- Secretary: Adriano Sollai
- President: Sarah Poddighe
- Founded: 2 January 2011
- Split from: Independence Republic of Sardinia
- Headquarters: Cagliari
- Ideology: Regionalism; Sardinian nationalism; Social democracy; Separatism
- Regional affiliation: Est Ora (with Torra)
- Colours: Green
- Regional Council of Sardinia: 0 / 60

Website
- www.progeturepublica.net

Project Republic of Sardinia (Sardinian: Progetu Repùblica de Sardigna, ProgReS) is a regionalist, Sardinian nationalist, social democratic and separatist political party in Sardinia, founded in January 2011 following a split from Independence Republic of Sardinia (iRS).

The party's current secretary is Adriano Sollai, while Sarah Poddighe serves as its president.

== History ==
In January 2011, after a struggle with Gavino Sale, president of iRS, the faction led by former leader Ornella Demuru, including iRS founding members Frantziscu Sanna and Franciscu Sedda, decided to leave the party and launch the Republican Constituent Assembly (Sa Costituente Repubricana). In February the new party took the name Project Republic of Sardinia (ProgReS) and Bobore Bussa was elected as provisional leader.

The party made its first electoral appearance in May 2011 at the municipal elections in Cagliari and Olbia by filing candidates for mayor (Demuru in Cagliari and Gianmaria Bellu in Olbia) and for the city councils. In both cases the ProgReS mayoral candidates took less than 1% of the vote. However, the results were welcomed by the party as encouraging, considering the lack of resources available, as well as the fact that the party was new and had yet to make a name for itself.

At the party's first congress in August 2011, Bussa was replaced as secretary by Salvatore Acampora, while Omar Onnis was elected president.

In July 2012 Demuru and Sedda left the party over disagreements with the new leadership and the rise of Michela Murgia, a well-known writer. A year later Sedda went on to launch with Paolo Maninchedda the Party of Sardinians (PdS), a splinter from the Sardinian Action Party (PSd'Az).

At the party's second congress in December 2012, members were presented with two options for the leadership: a slate led by Franco Contu and an alternative proposal whereby each coordinator of the nine regional constituencies would have taken the role of party leader for a limited period time, thus creating a rotational leadership. Contu won and was re-elected secretary. The congress also accepted a proposal to appoint two presidents, one male and one female: Sandro Ghiani and Federica Serra.

In August 2013 Murgia announced she would be the party's candidate for President of Sardinia in the 2014 regional election. In November 2013 at the party's national assembly, Paolo Piras, formerly responsible for communication in party leadership, was elected secretary to replace Contu, who resigned and moved to mainland Italy for work reasons. In the forthcoming election Murgia won 10.3% of the vote, but ProgReS, which suffered from competition with two coalition partners, won 2.8% and failed to pass the 5% threshold for parties. The other two ProgReS' emanations won 2.2% and 1.8% of the vote, respectively.

In May 2014 at the party's third congress, Gianluca Collu was elected secretary, while Carla Carcangiu and Sebastian Madau were elected presidents. At the party's fourth congress in May 2015, Collu, Carcangiu, and Madau were confirmed in their roles.

In the 2019 regional election the party formed a joint list with Unidos, a centre-right separatist party, and minor groups. Unidos' leader, Mauro Pili, ran as the list's candidate for president, winning 2.3% of the vote. The list obtained 2.1% and no seats on the Regional Council.

In December 2020, during the party's fifth congress, Luigi Todde was elected secretary and Adriano Sollai president. Sollai would soon replace Todde as secretary.

In July 2021, during the party's sixth congress, Sollai was re-elected secretary and Sarah Poddighe was appointed president. Also in 2021 the party entered into a federative pact named Est Ora (It's Time) with iRS and a brand new group named Torra (Again).

In the 2024 regional election formed a joint list with iRS and obtained 1.6% of the vote and no seats in the Regional Council. After the defeat, ProgRes paused its activities.

== Organisation ==
The party is organised into territorial activity centers (Tzentros de Atividade; TzdA) and the Sardinian diaspora in Europe and in the world is represented by the TzdA Disterru. ProgReS is the second party after iRS to organise and involve the Sardinian diaspora in regional politics. All party activists are members of the party's highest decision-making assembly: the National Assembly of activists.

== Electoral results ==
Election year	Votes	Vote %	Seats won	Seat change
2014	18,845	2.7	0 / 60	new
2019	15,234 (Note: Joint list with Unidos and minor groups)	2.1	0 / 60	Steady

== Leadership ==
=== Secretary ===
- Bobore Bussa (2011)
- Salvatore Acampora (2011–2012)
- Franco Contu (2012–2013)
- Paolo Piras (2013–2014)
- Gianluca Collu (2014–2019)
- Luigi Todde (2019–2020)
- Adriano Sollai (2020–present)

=== President ===
- Omar Onnis (2011–2012)
- Federica Serra and Sandro Ghiani (2012–2014)
- Carla Carcangiu and Sebastian Madau (2014–2019)
- Adriano Sollai (2019–2020)
- Sarah Poddighe (2021–present)
