= Red Moors =

Red Moors Rossomori
- Secretary: Lucia Chessa
- President: Natacha Lampis
- Founded: 2009
- Split from: Sardinian Action Party
- Headquarters: Via Niccolò Machiavelli, 132 - 09131 Cagliari
- Ideology: Regionalism; Sardinian nationalism Social democracy Separatism
- Political position: Centre-left
- Regional Council of Sardinia: 0 / 60

Website
- https://www.rossomori.it/

Red Moors (Italian: Rossomori, RM) is a regionalist, Sardinian nationalist, social-democratic, and separatist political party in Sardinia. The party was founded in 2009 as a left-wing split from the Sardinian Action Party (Psd'Az), after the Psd'Az had signed an electoral pact with The People of Freedom, the main centre-right party in Italy, and would later team up with Lega Nord.

In the 2009 regional election the RM won 2.5% of the vote, despite not being on the ballot in three provincial constituencies out of eight, and one regional councillor, Claudia Zuncheddu. The list did better in the province of Sassari (4.2%) and the province of Nuoro (3.3%). In the 2010 provincial elections the Red Moors improved their share of vote and were particularly strong in Medio Campidano (7.1%), the province of Nuoro (4.2%) and the province of Cagliari (3.1%).

In January 2011, Zuncheddu left the party in order to join Independence Republic of Sardinia (iRS). This caused a major upheaval within the party, which was left without representation in the Regional Council. However, the party pushed back and, in the 2014 regional election, it won 2.6% of the vote and two regional councillors.

In the 2019 regional election the party formed, outside big coalitions, a joint list with the iRS and Sardigna Natzione Indipendentzia (SNI) named "Self-determination" and obtained 1.9% of the vote. As a result, the party was no longer represented in the Regional Council. In June 2021, during a party congress, Lucia Chessa and Natacha Lampis were elected secretary and president, respectively.

In the 2024 regional election Chessa ran as a stand-alone candidate, obtaining 1.0% of the vote, while the party got 0.6% of the vote and no seats in the Regional Council.

== Leadership ==
- Secretary: Gesuino Muledda (2009–2012), Salvatore Melis (2012–2014), Marco Pau (2014–2021), Lucia Chessa (2021–present)
- President: Paola Zunchedda (2009–2011), Gesuino Muledda (2012–2018), Natacha Lampis (2021–present)
