= Fortza Paris =

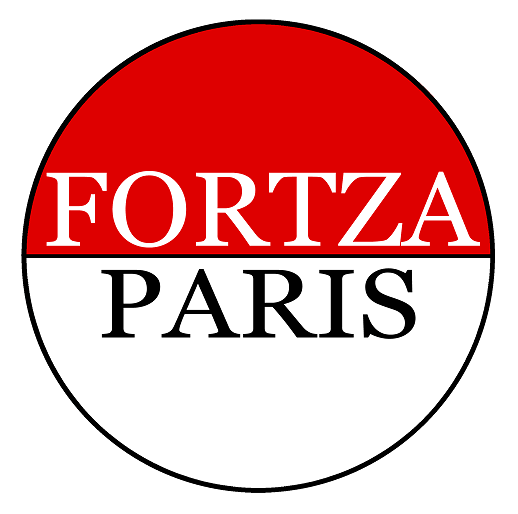
- President: Gianfranco Scalas
- Founded: 3 March 2004
- Preceded by: Sardinian People's Party
- Headquarters: Via Enrico Mattei 17; Oristano
- Ideology: Regionalism; Sardinian nationalism Christian democracy
- National affiliation: Centre-right coalition (2004–2023); Centre-left coalition (2023–present)
- Regional Council of Sardinia: 0 / 60

Website
- www.fortzaparis.com

Fortza Paris (English: Forward Together) is a regionalist, Sardinian nationalist and mainly Christian-democratic political party in Sardinia.

The party was established in 2004 at the merger of the Sardinian People's Party (PPS) – splinter group of the Italian People's Party and briefly regional section of the United Christian Democrats –, Sardistas and Unity of Sardinian People. Its self-proclaimed ideology comprises "all what the 20th Century had it good", including Christian democracy, liberalism, social democracy and federalism.

== History ==
In the 2004 regional election FP, within the centre-right coalition, won 4.6% of the vote and three regional councillors. In the 2005 provincial elections FP's secretary Pasquale Onida was elected president of the province of Oristano, where the party's share reached 11.4%.

In the 2008 general election party leader Silvestro Ladu was an unsuccessful candidate for The People of Freedom (PdL) for the Senate. Later that year, several FP members, including Onida, Ladu and other two regional councillors (one coming from the Union of Christian and Centre Democrats) joined the PdL, while a minority, led by president Gianfranco Scalas, did not.

In the 2009 regional election FP won 2.2% in a joint list with the regional section of the Movement for Autonomies (a Sicilian-based party), but neither Scalas nor any other party members were elected to the Regional Council. However, two FP dissidents, Domenico Gallus and Renato Lai, who stood for the PdL, did get in. Later that year a former member of FP, Adriano Aversano, launched Lega Sarda, that aimed at becoming the Sardinian "national section" of Lega Nord. In fact, in that very year the federal leadership of Lega Nord supported the creation of Lega Nord Sardinia.

In the 2010 provincial elections the party was able to field candidates in only half of Sardinian provinces and suffered a general decline in term of votes, except in its stronghold province of Oristano, where it won 9.9% of the vote.

In the 2014 regional election the party won a mere 0.7% of the vote and no regional councillors.

In the 2019 regional election the party won 1.6% within and obtained one seat in the Regional Council.

In the run-up of the 2024 regional election the party switched sides and affiliated with the centre-left coalition, obtaining 0.9% of the vote and no seats in the Regional Council.

== Election results ==
=== Regional elections ===
Election	Votes	%	Seats	+/–
2004	39,086	4.60	3 / 85	New
2014	5,359	0.78	0 / 60	Steady
2019	11,611	1.63	1 / 60	▲1
2024	6,068	0.88	0 / 60	▼1

== Leadership ==
- President: Gianfranco Scalas (2004–present)
- Secretary: Pasquale Onida (2004–2011), Enzo Brandinu / Bachisio Falchi / Roberto Mette / Federico Orgiana (2022–present)
  - Coordinator: Antonio Cardin (2019–2022), Mauro Natalino Bulla (2022–present)
- Honorary President: Benito Orgiana (2019–2021)
