= Sardinian Autonomist Populars =

The Sardinian Autonomist Populars (Popolari Autonomisti Sardi, PAS) was a tiny regionalist Christian-democratic Italian political party based in Sardinia.

The party was founded on 1 March 2008 by Sardinian splinters from the UDEUR led by Antonio Satta, who was at the time deputy national secretary. All the eight provincial sections of UDEUR followed Satta into the new party.

After trying to form an alliance for the 2008 general election either with the Union of Christian and Centre Democrats or the Movement for Autonomy, in June the PAS joined forces with splinters of The Rose for Italy led by Mario Baccini in order to form the Federation of Christian Populars (FCP). Satta became vice president of the new party, while Enrico Piras was appointed regional leader. In August 2009, however, Satta left FCP in order to launch the Christian Popular Union.
