= Alessandra Todde =

Italian politician (born 1969)

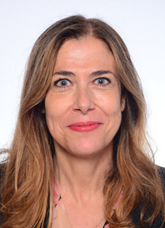
- Official portrait, 2022

President of Sardinia
- Incumbent
- Assumed office 20 March 2024
- Preceded by: Christian Solinas

Vice President of the Five Star Movement
- In office 21 October 2021 – 11 December 2023
- President: Giuseppe Conte
- Preceded by: Office established
- Succeeded by: Chiara Appendino

Member of the Chamber of Deputies
- In office 13 October 2022 – 9 April 2024
- Succeeded by: Antonio Ferrara
- Constituency: Lombardy

Deputy Minister of Economic Development
- In office 1 March 2021 – 22 October 2022
- Prime Minister: Mario Draghi
- Minister: Giancarlo Giorgetti
- Preceded by: Stefano Buffagni
- Succeeded by: Valentino Valentini

Undersecretary of State of Economic Development
- In office 16 September 2019 – 13 February 2021
- Prime Minister: Giuseppe Conte
- Preceded by: Michele Geraci
- Succeeded by: Anna Ascani

Personal details
- Born: 6 February 1969 (age 57) Nuoro, Italy
- Party: Five Star Movement
- Education: University of Pisa

Alessandra Todde (born 6 February 1969) is an Italian politician who is the current President of Sardinia, the first woman to hold the office. Prior to her tenure as president she was a member of the Chamber of Deputies from 2022 to 2024, and vice president of the Five Star Movement (M5S) from 2021 to 2023. She held positions within the Second Conte and Draghi governments.

== Early life and education ==
Alessandra Todde was born in Nuoro, Sardinia, on 6 February 1969. She graduated from the University of Pisa in 2005, with a Master's degree in computer science and computer engineering. Todde was a partner in Kaufmann & Partners, an investment firm in Madrid. She served as the CEO of Olidata until 2019, and Energeya, which she founded.

== Career ==
In the 2022 election Todde was elected to the Chamber of Deputies from the multi-member constituency of Lombardy 2 as a member of the Five Star Movement (M5S). Her tenure in the Chamber of Deputies ended on 9 April 2024, and was replaced by Anthony Ferrara.

In the Second Conte government Todde served undersecretary of state in the Minister of Economic Development from 16 September 2019 to 13 February 2021. In the Draghi government she was deputy minister for Economic Development from 1 March 2021 to 22 October 2022. From 21 October 2021 to 11 December 2023, Todde was the vice president of the M5S.

In the 2024 Sardinian election the M5S defeated the Brothers of Italy. Todde became president and was the first woman elected to the presidency.

== Personal life ==
Todde can speak English, Spanish, French, and Sardinian.

== Works cited ==
=== News ===
- "Profile of Alessandra Todde, Candidate for Governor of Sardinia". Il Messaggero. 26 February 2024. Archived from the original on 22 June 2025.
- Giuffrida, Angela (27 February 2024). "Sardinia elects leftwing president, in blow to Giorgia Meloni". The Guardian. Archived from the original on 22 June 2025.

=== Web ===
- "Alessandra Todde". 5GItaly. Archived from the original on 22 June 2025.
- "Alessandra Todde Curriculum Vitae" (PDF). Regional Council of Sardinia. Archived (PDF) from the original on 22 June 2025.
- "TODD Alessandra". Chamber of Deputies. Archived from the original on 22 June 2025.
