= 2009 Sardinian regional election =

- 15–16 February 2009

All 80 seats to the Regional Council of Sardinia
- Turnout: 67.58% (▼3.4%)
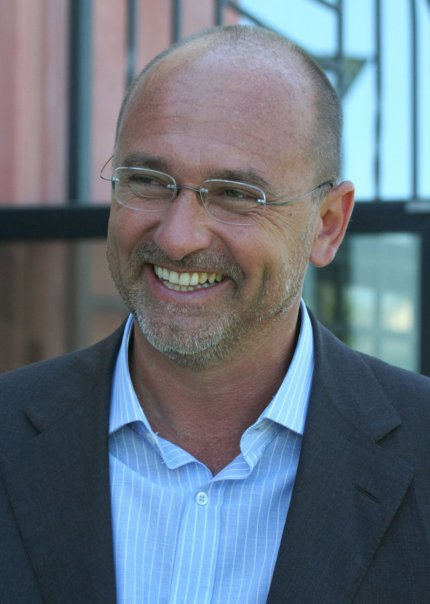

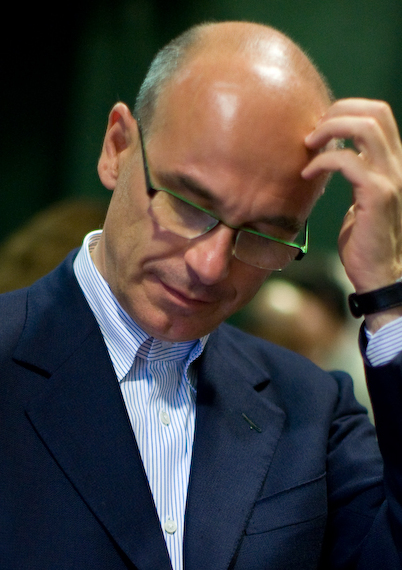
	Majority party	Minority party
Candidate	Ugo Cappellacci	Renato Soru
Party	People of Freedom	Democratic Party
Alliance	Centre-right	Centre-left
Seats won	53	27
Seat change	▲23	▼24
Popular vote	502,084	415,600
Percentage	51.9%	42.9%
Swing	▲11.4%	▼7.2%
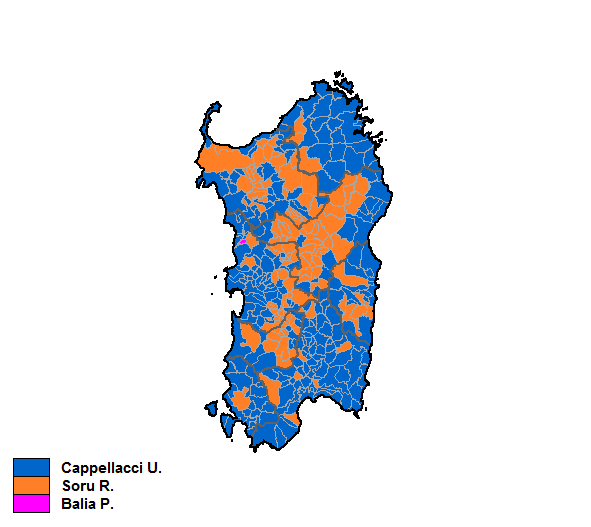
President before election
Carlo Mannoni
PD
Elected President
Ugo Cappellacci
PdL

The Sardinian regional election of 2009 took place in Sardinia, Italy, on 15–16 February 2009.

The election was called few months before the natural end of the legislature because of the resignation of the incumbent President Renato Soru. Ugo Cappellacci, the centre-right candidate, defeated Soru by a large margin.

== Electoral system ==
The electoral system used for this election was the national Tatarella Law of 1995, used by most of Italian regions to elect their Council. Sixty-four councillors were elected in provincial constituencies by proportional representation using the largest remainder method with a Droop quota and open lists; remained seats and votes were grouped at regional level where a Hare quota is used, and then distributed to provincial party lists.

Ten councillors were elected at-large using a general ticket: parties were grouped in alliances, and the alliance which received a plurality of votes elected all its candidates, its leader becoming the President of Sardinia.

== Council apportionment ==
According to the official 2001 Italian census, the 64 Council seats which must be covered by proportional representation were so distributed between Sardinian provinces.

CA	CI	MC	NU	OG	OT	OR	SS	total
21	5	4	7	2	5	7	13	64

It must be underlined that this allocation is not fixed. Remained seats and votes after proportional distribution, are all grouped at regional level and divided by party lists.

== Results ==
15–16 February 2009 Sardinian regional election results
Candidate	Regional lists			Provincial lists				Total
Candidate	votes	%	seats	Party	votes	%	seats	group
Ugo Cappellacci	502,084	51.88	9	The People of Freedom	248,654	30.11	25	53
Ugo Cappellacci	502,084	51.88	9	Union of the Centre	75,451	9.13	7	53
Ugo Cappellacci	502,084	51.88	9	Sardinian Reformers	56,056	6.78	5	53
Ugo Cappellacci	502,084	51.88	9	Sardinian Action Party	35,428	4.29	4	53
Ugo Cappellacci	502,084	51.88	9	United Sardinia	28,928	3.50	2	53
Ugo Cappellacci	502,084	51.88	9	Together for the Autonomies	18,500	2.24	1	53
Renato Soru	415,600	42.94	1	Democratic Party	204,223	24.73	18	27
Renato Soru	415,600	42.94	1	Italy of Values	41,321	5.00	3	27
Renato Soru	415,600	42.94	1	Communist Refoundation Party	26,454	3.20	2	27
Renato Soru	415,600	42.94	1	Red Moors	21,034	2.54	1	27
Renato Soru	415,600	42.94	1	Party of Italian Communists	15,870	1.92	1	27
Renato Soru	415,600	42.94	1	Left for Sardinia	13,508	1.63	1	27
Gavino Sale	29,640	3.06	-	Independence Republic of Sardinia	17,141	2.07	0	-
Peppino Balia	15,037	1.55	-	Italian Socialist Party	19,488	2.36	0	-
Gianfranco Sollai	5,316	0.55	-	Unidade Indipendentista (incl. SNI and aMpI)	3,695	0.44	0	-
Total candidates	967,677	100.00	10	Total parties	825,751	100.00	70	80

Source: Regional Council of Sardinia
