= Union of Sardinians =

Union of Sardinians Unione dei Sardi
- Leader: Mario Floris
- Secretary: Antonio Nicolini
- Founded: 1998
- Headquarters: Via Ospedale, 16; 09124 Cagliari
- Ideology: Regionalism; Sardinian nationalism Christian democracy
- Regional Council of Sardinia: 0 / 60

Website
- www.uds-unionedeisardi.it

The Union of Sardinians – Nationalist Project (Unione dei Sardi – Progetto Nazionalitario, UdS–PN), previously known as Sardinian Democratic Union (Unione Democratica Sarda, UDS) was a regionalist, Sardinian nationalist and Christian-democratic political party in Sardinia.

== History ==
The Sardinian Democratic Union was founded in 1998 as Sardinian section of Democratic Union for the Republic of Francesco Cossiga, a Sardinian who had been prime minister and President of Italy. In the 1999 regional election Floris won 6.2% as candidate for president, while the party won 4.1% and three regional councillors. Subsequently, UDS leader Mario Floris, a former Christian Democrat, was President of the Region from 1999 to 2001.

In the 2004 regional election the UDS, which had been re-established taking the current name, won 3.9% of the vote and two regional councillors. After that, the party became a stable regional ally of The People of Freedom (PdL). In the 2009 regional election, in coalition with the centre-right, the UDS won 3.5% of the vote and got two regional councillors elected (Floris and a member of the New Italian Socialist Party). In the 2010 provincial elections the party was strongest in the Province of Cagliari, where it won 3.8% of the vote.

Since 2008 the party was for a while the regional section of the Alliance of the Centre, a small party that was later merged into PdL.

In the 2014 regional election the UdS–PN obtained 2.6% of the vote and Floris was once again re-elected to the Council.

In the 2019 regional election the UdS–PN obtained 1.1% of the vote and no seats in the Regional Council.

== Leadership ==
- Secretary: Mario Floris (1998–2018), Antonio Nicolini (2018–present)
