= Ugo Cappellacci =

Italian politician (born 1960)

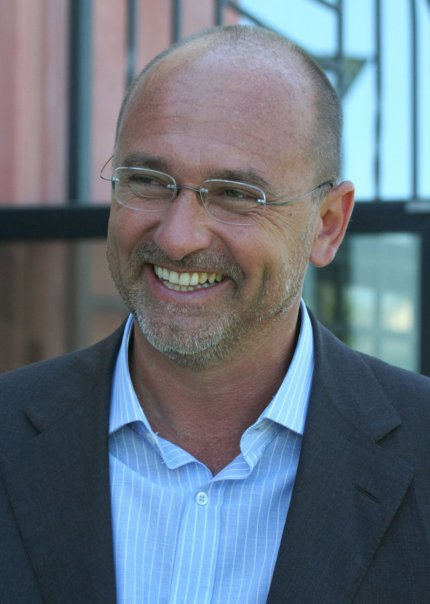

President of Sardinia
- In office 27 February 2009 – 12 March 2014
- Preceded by: Renato Soru
- Succeeded by: Francesco Pigliaru

Personal details
- Born: 27 November 1960 (age 65) Cagliari, Italy
- Party: Forza Italia (2013-present)
- Other political affiliations: The People of Freedom (2009-2013)
- Education: Bocconi University
- Profession: Politician

Ugo Cappellacci (born 27 November 1960 in Cagliari, Italy) is an Italian Sardinian politician and member of the Forza Italia (FI) political party. Cappellacci, a center-right politician, was elected President of Sardinia in the 2009 regional election, held in February 2009, with 51.9% of the vote, ousting the incumbent left-wing coalition led by Renato Soru, who garnered 42.89%. He took office as President on 27 February 2009. He lost as incumbent to Francesco Pigliaru of the Democratic Party in the 2014 regional election.
