= 2014 Sardinian regional election =

- 16 February 2014

All 60 seats to the Regional Council of Sardinia
- Turnout: 52.28% (▼15.3%)
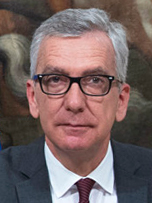

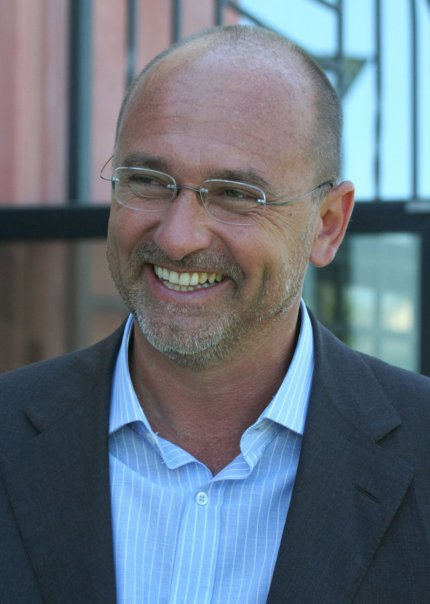
	Majority party	Minority party
Candidate	Francesco Pigliaru	Ugo Cappellacci
Party	Democratic Party	Forza Italia
Alliance	Centre-left	Centre-right
Seats won	36	24
Seat change	▲9	▼29
Popular vote	312,982	292,395
Percentage	42.4%	39.6%
Swing	▼0.5%	▼12.3%
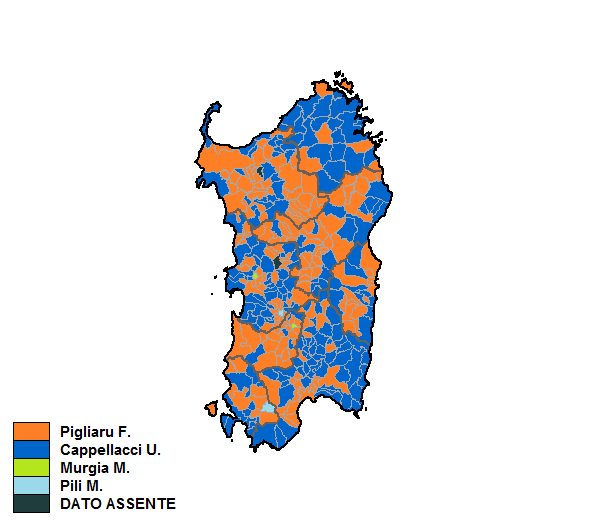
President before election
Ugo Cappellacci
FI
Elected President
Francesco Pigliaru
PD

The Sardinian regional election of 2014 in Italy took place on 16 February 2014.

Francesco Pigliaru of the Democratic Party defeated the incumbent, Ugo Cappellacci of Forza Italia. The combined score of the highly fragmented Sardist parties was 26%.

The Five Star Movement did not take part to the election, after Beppe Grillo refused to concede the use of his party's symbol.

The novelist Michela Murgia, who received more than the 10% of votes, was not elected because of the new high electoral threshold.

== New electoral system ==
In 2013 Sardinian electoral law was changed once again.

While the President of Sardinia and the first leader of the opposition are still elected at-large, 58 councillors, instead of 64 as it was before, are elected by party lists under a form of semi-proportional representation. The winning coalition receives a jackpot of additional seats, which are divided between all majority parties using the D'Hondt method, as it happens between the losing lists. Each party then distributes its seats to its provincial lists, where candidates are openly selected.

The electoral threshold is fixed at 10% for coalitions and 5% for single parties. No electoral threshold is fixed for those parties inside a coalition. The leader of the alliance which receives a plurality of votes and at least 25% of votes becomes the President of Sardinia.

== Results ==
2014 Sardinia regional election results
Candidates	Votes	%	Seats	Parties	Votes	%	Seats
Francesco Pigliaru	312,982	42.45	1	Democratic Party	150,492	22.06	18
Francesco Pigliaru	312,982	42.45	1	Left Ecology Freedom	35,376	5.18	4
Francesco Pigliaru	312,982	42.45	1	Party of Sardinians	18,178	2.66	2
Francesco Pigliaru	312,982	42.45	1	Red Moors	13,892	2.63	2
Francesco Pigliaru	312,982	42.45	1	Democratic Centre	14,451	2.11	2
Francesco Pigliaru	312,982	42.45	1	Communist Refoundation Party	13,892	2.03	2
Francesco Pigliaru	312,982	42.45	1	Christian Popular Union	11,639	1.70	1
Francesco Pigliaru	312,982	42.45	1	Italian Socialist Party	9,518	1.39	1
Francesco Pigliaru	312,982	42.45	1	Italy of Values – Greens	7,551	1.10	1
Francesco Pigliaru	312,982	42.45	1	Independence Republic of Sardinia	5,599	0.82	1
Francesco Pigliaru	312,982	42.45	1	The Base	4,897	0.71	1
Francesco Pigliaru	312,982	42.45	1	Total	289,573	42.45	35
Ugo Cappellacci	292,395	39.65	1	Forza Italia	126,327	18.52	10
Ugo Cappellacci	292,395	39.65	1	Union of the Centre	51,923	7.61	4
Ugo Cappellacci	292,395	39.65	1	Sardinian Reformers	41,060	6.02	3
Ugo Cappellacci	292,395	39.65	1	Sardinian Action Party	31,886	4.67	3
Ugo Cappellacci	292,395	39.65	1	Brothers of Italy	19,275	2.82	1
Ugo Cappellacci	292,395	39.65	1	Union of Sardinians	17,728	2.60	1
Ugo Cappellacci	292,395	39.65	1	Sardinia Free Zone Movement	11,150	1.63	1
Ugo Cappellacci	292,395	39.65	1	Total	299.349	43.89	23
Michela Murgia	75,981	10.30	–	Project Republic of Sardinia	18,845	2.76	–
Michela Murgia	75,981	10.30	–	Gentes	15,271	2.24	–
Michela Murgia	75,981	10.30	–	Comunitades	12,074	1.77	–
Michela Murgia	75,981	10.30	–	Total	46,190	6.77	–
Mauro Pili	42,236	5.72	–	Unidos	19,356	2.83	–
Mauro Pili	42,236	5.72	–	Mauro Pili for President	11,454	1.68	–
Mauro Pili	42,236	5.72	–	Fortza Paris	5,018	0.73	–
Mauro Pili	42,236	5.72	–	Soberania	1,231	0.18	–
Mauro Pili	42,236	5.72	–	Total	37.059	5.43	–
Pierfranco Devias	7,626	1.03	–	United Independentist Front	4,772	0.70	–
Luigi Amedeo Sanna	6,085	0.82	–	Free Zone Movement	5.079	0.74	–
Invalid votes	37,634	–					
Total candidates	737,305	100.00	2	Total parties	682,022	100.00	58
Registered voters	1,480,332	52.34					
Source: Autonomous Region of Sardinia – Results (1,828 of 1,836 President; 1,824 of 1,826 Lists)

Popular vote
PD	22.06%
FI	18.52%
UdC	7.61%
RS	6.02%
SEL	5.18%
PSd'Az	4.67%
Unidos	2.83%
FdI	2.82%
Others	30.29%

President
Pigliaru	42.45%
Cappellacci	39.65%
Murgia	10.30%
Pili	5.72%
Devias	1.03%
Sanna	0.82%
