= Michela Murgia =

Italian novelist, playwright, and radio personality (1972–2023)

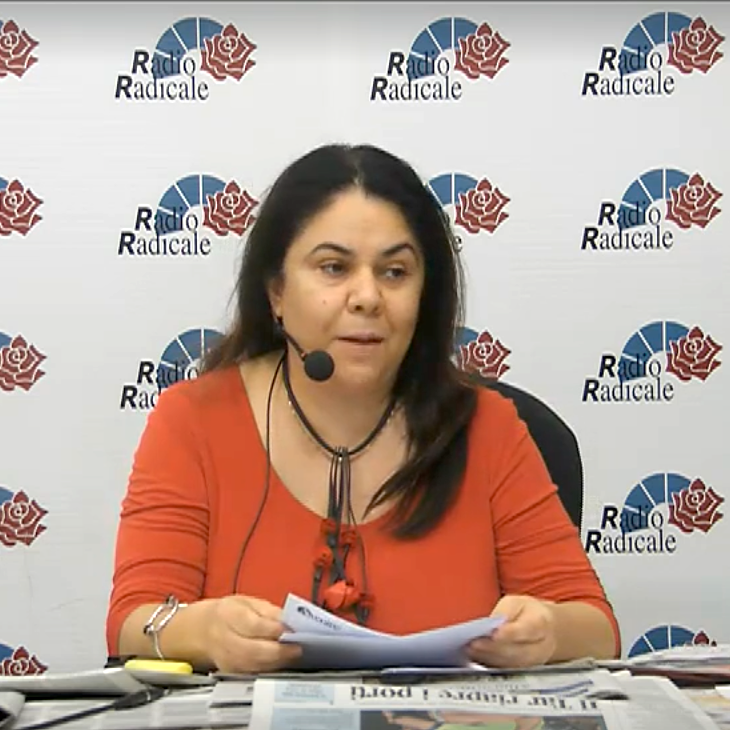
- Murgia in 2019
- Born: 3 June 1972; Cabras, Italy
- Died: 10 August 2023 (aged 51); Rome, Italy
- Occupations: Novelist, radio personality
- Spouse(s): Manuel Persico (m. 2010; div. 2014) Lorenzo Terenzi (m. 2023)
- Writing career
- Period: 2006–2023
- Notable work: Accabadora
- Notable awards: Campiello Prize

Michela Murgia (Italian: [miˈkɛːla ˈmurdʒa], Sardinian: [miˈkɛla ˈmuɾdʒa]; 3 June 1972 – 10 August 2023) was an Italian novelist, playwright, and radio personality. She was a winner of the Campiello Prize, the Mondello International Literary Prize and Literary Award Giuseppe Dessì, and was an active feminist and left-wing voice in the Italian public scene, speaking out on themes such as euthanasia and LGBTQ+ rights.

== Early life ==
Michela Murgia was born in Cabras, Sardinia, on 3 June 1972. At the age of 18, she was taken in by her adoptive family as a filla de ànima, a 'soul-child', a traditional Sardinian adoption. In contrast to the usual age of between 10 and 14 years, Murgia's adoption was delayed because of her natural father's opposition.

Murgia attended the Lorenzo Mossa Institute for Technical Studies in Oristano, and then joined the Institute of Religious Studies of the Roman Catholic Archdiocese of Oristano to study theology. She taught religious studies at middle and grammar schools in Oristano for six years but never finished her studies. Among many other job experiences, before dedicating herself to writing she was a multi property seller, a fiscal operator, an administrative manager in a thermoelectrical centre and even a nighttime doorkeeper. She was also active in the Catholic Action for a period as a regional referent for the youth section and she always considered herself a "believer". She ideated a theatre representation for the end of the end of the national pilgrimage of the Azione Cattolica in the Piana di Loreto in September 2004, with Pope Giovanni II attending. She kept a blog, Il Mio Sinis, in which she described the peninsula of Sinis with the help of photography.

== Career ==
=== Literary career ===
Michela Murgia's first work, Il mondo deve sapere, was published in 2006. First imagined and created as a blog, this was a satire on the telemarketing call centre of an important multinational, Kirby Company, highlighting the economic exploitation and psychological manipulation of its workers. The book was dramatised for the stage by David Emmer and starred Teresa Saponangelo. It was also filmed by Paolo Virzì, and released in 2008 as Your Whole Life Ahead of You, with Isabella Ragonese, Sabrina Ferilli, Elio Germano, Valerio Mastandrea and Massimo Ghini.

By 2004 Murgia was already among the 42 writers reunited by Giulio Angioni in Cartas de logu: scrittori sardi allo specchio (Cartas de logu: Sardinian writers at the mirror). In 2008 she published Viaggio in Sardegna (Trip to Sardinia) for Einaudi, a literary guide to the lesser-known locations of the island. In 2009 she published for Einaudi the novel Accabadora, a story which unites the themes of euthanasia and adoption in 1950s Sardinia. The novel was published in a German translation in 2010 for Wagenbach and gained several awards including the Literary Award Giuseppe Dessì 2009, the Mondello International Literary Prize and the Molinello Award for First Fiction. Accabadora was also published as an audiobook, narrated by Murgia, for Emons Audiolibri.

In 2011 Maurizio Zanolla, a free climber, dedicated a climbing path he opened together with Bruno Fonnesu to Accabadora in Gutturu Cardaxius. In 2011 she also published, for Einaudi, Ave Mary. E la chiesa inventò la donna (hail mary: and the church invented the woman). From this book, Punkreas got their inspiration for the lyrics of Santa Madonna, written for Fedez and part of the Mr. Brainwash album 2013. In 2008, Murgia wrote a travel book on her native Sardinia.

In 2012, still with Einaudi, she published L'incontro (the meeting) and a story in the anthology Presente (AA.VV.). Also in the same year, on behalf of Caracò Editore, he published the anthology Piciocas. Storie di ex bambine dell'Isola che c'è,(Stories of former girls from the Island that exists), the story The Lobster. In 2013 she published for Laterza the pamphlet against feminicide written together with Loredana Lipperini and entitled L'ho uccisa perché l'amavo. Falso! (I killed her because I loved her: false!) In October 2015 the novel Chirú was published by Einaudi, a novel about a cross-generational mentoring relationship. In the spring of 2016, again for Einaudi, she published the pamphlet Futuro Interiore on the themes of identity, power and democracy. In the 2016-2017 television season, she participated in the program Quante storie on Rai 3 with a daily column of literary reviews and book recommendations. From 30 September 2017 to 4 November 2017 she hosted Chakra on Saturday afternoons on Rai 3.

In 2018 she published for Marsilio the literary memoir L'inferno è una buona memoria (Hell is a good memory), inspired by the novel Le nebbie di Avalon (The Mists of Avalon) by Marion Zimmer Bradley. Two months later, the political pamphlet Istruzioni per diventare fascisti (Instructions for becoming fascists) was published by Einaudi and translated into five languages. In February 2019, the collection of illustrated stories Noi siamo tempesta (We are a storm) was released by the Adriano Salani editions, which in the same year won the Morante prize and the special mention of the jury of the Andersen prize.

In 2019, in collaboration with Chiara Tagliaferri, she published for Arnoldo Mondadori Editore the collection of biographical stories Morgana, Storie di ragazze che tua madre non approverebbe (Stories of girls that your mother wouldn't approve of), taken from the podcast of the same name on the Storie Libere platform that the two authors have been creating together since 2018. In the same year, she contributed to the anthology Le nuove Eroidi (The New Heroids) for HarperCollins, with the story Elena.

=== Journalistic career ===
Murgia wrote as a columnist for L'Espresso; her column, which began in January 2021, was titled "L'Antitaliana" ("the anti-Italian"). L'Espresso was created in the 1980s and edited first by Giorgio Bocca and then by Roberto Saviano; Michela Murgia was the first woman to write this column. From September 2019 to August 2020 she hosted the daily evening program TgZero at Radio Capital, together with Edoardo Buffoni, until January 2019 hosted by Vittorio Zucconi. On 7 December 2020 Michela Murgia was invited to open, with an introductory speech, the premiere of the Teatro la Scala in Milan, which took place behind closed doors due to the COVID emergency and broadcast on television.

On 6 May 2023, in an interview with the Corriere della Sera, she declared that she had a few months to live due to a form of stage four renal adenocarcinoma with metastases to the lungs, bone tissue and brain.

=== Acting career and theatre plays ===
In 2016, for the production of the Teatro di Sardegna, she wrote two plays which were staged at the Teatro Massimo in Cagliari. One is the three-act dystopia Cento, directed by Marco Sanna, with Lia Careddu, Felice Montervino, Isella Orchis, Leonardo Tomasi and Francesca Ventriglia.The other is the monologue in Sardinian language Spadoneri, staged and directed by Elio Turno Arthemalle. In November of the same year, at the Giovanni XXIII Congress Center in Bergamo, a stage reading of her text Caterina da Siena, written with Elena Maffioletti and performed by Arianna Scommegna, was carried out under the direction of Serena Sinigaglia. In September 2017, for the production of the Teatro di Roma, his text Festa Nazionale was included in the collective project Portrait of a Nation, in which other Italian playwrights such as Vitaliano Trevisan and Marco Martinelli participated together with Murgia, and was staged with the direction by Fabrizio Arcuri and the interpretation of Arianna Scommegna and Fonte Fantasia.In the same year, the show Accabadora based on the novel of the same name debuted at the Teatro Biblioteca Quarticciolo in Rome, with the adaptation by Carlotta Corradi, the direction and production of Veronica Cruciani and the Teatro Donizetti of Bergamo and the interpretation of Monica Piseddu. In the same year she also made her debut at the Teatro Eliseo in Nuoro as an actress, in the showQuasi Grazia, a play by Marcello Fois, as Grazia Deledda. Quasi Grazia, written by Marcello Fois and produced by the Teatro di Sardegna directed by Veronica Cruciani, together with Marco Brinzi, Valentino Mannias and Lia Careddu. Since 2018 she has staged two theater productions: Instructions to become fascists, taken from his book of the same name and accompanied by the music of Frantziscu Medda Arrogalla, and Dove sono le donne (Where are the women), a monologue on the absence of gender representation in the institutions of politics and culture and the judiciary.

=== Political career and activism ===
In 2007 she supported the candidacy of Mario Adinolfi in the primary elections of the Democratic Party. In September 2010 she declared in an interview with the Corriere della Sera that she "hopes for the independence of Sardinia". She first supported the iRS - Indipendentzia Repubrica de Sardigna movement as a sympathizer, and later the independentist party ProgReS - Progetu Repùblica de Sardigna. In the regional elections of February 2014, she stood as a candidate as part of the Possible Sardinia coalition, which aimed to achieve Sardinian independence via the ballot, similar to the Catalan and the Scottish referendums of 2014. Murgia did not get a seat; she came third in the polls, gaining 10% of the vote.

In the 2019 European elections she supported the Left, a list that includes Sinistra Italiana, Rifondazione Comunista, L'Altra Europa con Tsipras, Convergenza Socialista, Partito del Sud (Party of the South) and Transform!Italia. The list obtained 1.75% of the valid votes and no seats.

She harshly criticized the positions of Giorgia Meloni, arguing that being a woman is not enough to be a feminist. In particular, she expressed her opinion on the Prime Minister's request to be called "il" (male article) president rather than "la" (female article).

== Personal life and death ==
From 2010 to 2014 she was married to Manuel Persico, a computer scientist from Bergamo. She had kidney cancer from 2014 to 2016 and then again in the last twenty months of her life.

In July 2023, she married actor and director Lorenzo Terenzi (born 1988) in articulo mortis, also as an act of denunciation of the shortcomings of Italian legislation on de facto couples. She wore a wedding dress designed by Maria Grazia Chiuri; the couple lived together with four fillos de ànima. She was proud of her extensive library; furthermore, she was a huge fan of J. R. R. Tolkien's work and K-pop culture, in particular the South Korean musical group BTS.

Murgia died in Rome on 10 August 2023, after battling stage IV kidney carcinoma. She was 51.

== Controversies ==
In February 2019 Michela Murgia was sentenced to pay the sum of 18,000 euros plus interest and legal costs, for breach of contract with the publishing house Il Maestrale. After her appeal on 2 April 2021 the Court presided over by Judge Maria Teresa Spanu confirmed the first instance sentence.

== Awards and honours ==
Murgia was a member of the Società Italiana delle Letterate.

- 2010 – Premio Campiello
- 2010 – Premio Mondello
- 2009 – Premio Dessì

== Bibliography ==
=== Novels ===
- Il mondo deve sapere: romanzo tragicomico di una telefonista precaria (Milan: Edizioni, 2006). ISBN 88-06-23095-6.
- Accabadora (Turin: Einaudi, 2009). ISBN 978-88-6621-311-6.
- L'incontro (Turin: Einaudi, 2012). ISBN 978-88-06-21883-6.
- Chirú (Turin: Einaudi, 2015). ISBN 978-88-06-20633-8.
- Noi siamo tempesta (Milan: Salani, 2019). ISBN 978-88-310-0763-4.
- Tre ciotole: rituali per un anno di crisi (Milan: Mondadori, 2023). ISBN 978-88-04-77489-1.

=== Non-fiction ===
- Viaggio in Sardegna: undici percorsi nell'isola che non si vede (Turin: Einaudi, 2008). ISBN 978-88-06-22219-2.
- Ave Mary: e la chiesa inventò la donna (Turin: Einaudi, 2011). ISBN 978-88-06-20134-0.
- L'ho uccisa perché l'amavo: falso! (with Loredana Lipperini) (Bari: Laterza, 2013). ISBN 978-88-581-0730-0.
- Morgana: storie di ragazze che tua madre non approverebbe (with Chiara Tagliaferri) (Milan: Mondadori, 2019). ISBN 978-88-04-71711-9.
- #Stai zitta e altre nove frasi che non vogliamo sentire più (Turin: Einaudi, 2021). ISBN 978-88-06-24918-2.
- God save the Queer. Catechismo femminista (Turin: Einaudi Stile Libero, 2022). ISBN 978-88-06-25910-5.

=== Works in English ===
- Accabadora (translated by Sylvester Mazzarella) (Berkeley, CA: Counterpoint, 2012). ISBN 978-1-4448-2040-9.
- How to Be a Fascist: a Manual (New York: Penguin Books, 2020). ISBN 978-0-14-313605-7.
