= Renato Soru =

Italian politician and entrepreneur (born 1957)

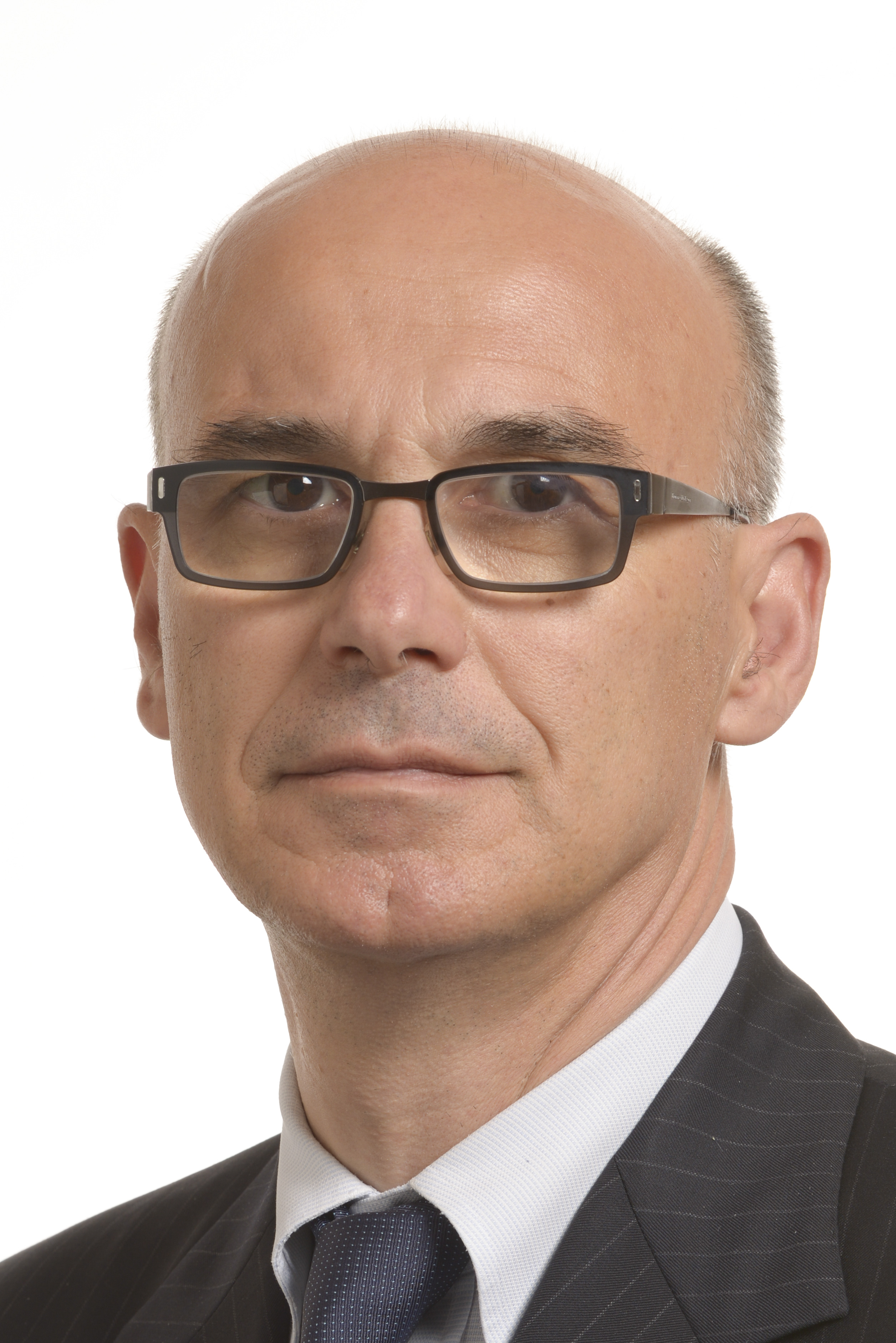

President of Sardinia
- In office 26 June 2004 – 27 February 2009
- Preceded by: Italo Masala
- Succeeded by: Ugo Cappellacci

Member of the European Parliament for Italian Islands
- In office 1 July 2014 – 1 July 2019

Personal details
- Born: 6 August 1957 (age 69) Sanluri, Italy
- Party: Sardinia Project (2003–2007; 2023–present)
- Other political affiliations: DS (until 2003); PD (2007–2009; 2014–2019); Independent (2009–2014; 2019–2023)
- Education: Bocconi University

Renato Soru (born 6 August 1957) is an Italian politician and entrepreneur. He is the founder of the internet service company Tiscali, based in Cagliari. Forbes listed Soru as one of the world's richest people, with a net worth of over $4 billion as of September 2001.

== Early life and education ==
Soru was born in Sanluri, Sardinia, in 1957. He holds a University degree from Bocconi University in Milan.

== Career ==
In 2004, Soru was elected the president of Sardinia with the centre-left coalition with an audacious program to reinvigorate the economy within the island by introducing external investors. On 28 November 2008, he resigned from his position. He ran again for president of Sardinia in the February 2009 election but was defeated by the right-wing Popolo della Libertà candidate Ugo Cappellacci.

On 20 May 2008, Soru bought the left-wing newspaper l'Unità.

== Controversies ==
On 5 May 2016, Soru was sentenced to three years in prison for tax evasion that amounted to about 2.6 million euro and was connected to a loan made by the company Andalas Ltd. to Tiscali. The sentence was reversed by the Italian Court of Appeal on 8 May 2017. Out of five counts, he was cleared from the third "because the fact is not a crime" and from the two "because the fact did not happen".
