= Council of State (Italy) =

Italian constitutional body

The Council of State (Italian: Consiglio di Stato) is a legal-administrative consultative body that ensures the legality of public administration in Italy. The council has jurisdiction over all administrative authorities' acts, except when these authorities lack discretionary power, in which case the dispute is considered one of civil law.

== Authority ==
The council derives its authority and powers from several articles in the Constitution of Italy.

Article 100:

The Council of State shall act as a consultative body on administrative law matters and as a judicial guarantee regarding administrative action.

Article 103:

The Council of State and the other bodies of administrative justice shall have jurisdiction for the protection, versus the public administration, of legitimate interests and, in specific matters determined by law, of subjective rights.

Article 111:

Appeals to the Court of Cassation against decisions of the Council of State and the Court of Auditors shall be admissible only for reasons relating to jurisdiction.

== Consultative role ==
The council has consultative authority in several different cases defined by statute.

1. Cases in which the consultation of the Council is compulsory (statute n°127 from May 15, 1997):
  1. drafts of regulations to be signed by a minister or by the President of the Republic;
  2. drafts of legislation or regulations unifying various previous texts;
  3. general models for certain types of contracts, agreements and conventions established by one or several ministers;
  4. administrative decisions which are bound by the advice of the Council of State in the instances provided for by legislation previous to the statute n°127/1997;
  5. extraordinary petitions to the President of the Republic (petitions in lieu of litigation sent by citizens to the President of the Republic as a fountain of justice are then transmitted to one of the administrative sections of the Council of State. The latter formulates advice: if the competent minister feels disinclined to follow it, he has to refer the case to the cabinet, which may vote to disregard the council's opinion).
2. Cases in which the Council may be consulted:
  1. bills and normative acts of the European Union;
  2. any question concerning the interpretation of statutes or good administration which a minister may wish to submit to the Council.

== Structure ==
The council has 111 members: the President, 18 presidents of sections and 92 councillors of State:

- Two consultative sections, of which one is on proposed new rules or regulations;
- Four judicial sections;
- Special (ad hoc) consultative commission;
- A consultative general assembly, composed of all the members of the Council of State;
- A plenary assembly of the judicial sections (13 members).
