= Francesco Pigliaru =

Italian politician

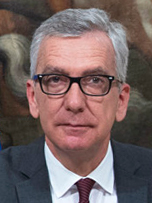

President of Sardinia
- In office 12 March 2014 – 20 March 2019
- Preceded by: Ugo Cappellacci
- Succeeded by: Christian Solinas

Personal details
- Born: 13 May 1954 (age 72) Sassari, Italy
- Party: Democratic Party
- Education: University of Sassari
- Profession: Politician, academic

Francesco Pigliaru (Sardinian: Frantziscu Pigliaru; born 13 May 1954 in Sassari) is an Italian economist, politician, and professor. He was prorector of the University of Cagliari from 2009 to 2014. He became President of the Autonomous Region of Sardinia on 12 March 2014, following the regional election of 16 February 2014.

== Biography ==
Born in Sassari, he is the son of the legal scholar Antonio Pigliaru.

He attended the Domenico Alberto Azuni Classical High School in Sassari, where he was active in Lotta Continua, and graduated in 1978 with a degree in Political Science from the University of Sassari. In 1979, he completed a specialization program at the Enrico Mattei School in Milan, and in 1981, he earned a master’s degree in “Philosophy of Economics” from the University of Cambridge.

From 1993 to 1998, he directed CRENoS (North-South Economic Research Center). He is a full professor of Political Economy at the University of Cagliari, where he served as provost from November 2009 to March 2014. He is the author of approximately thirty scholarly publications.

He served on the board of directors of Banco di Sardegna under the chairmanship of Sebastiano Brusco.
