= Province of Olbia-Tempio =

Province of Olbia-Tempio Provincia di Olbia-Tempio
- Province
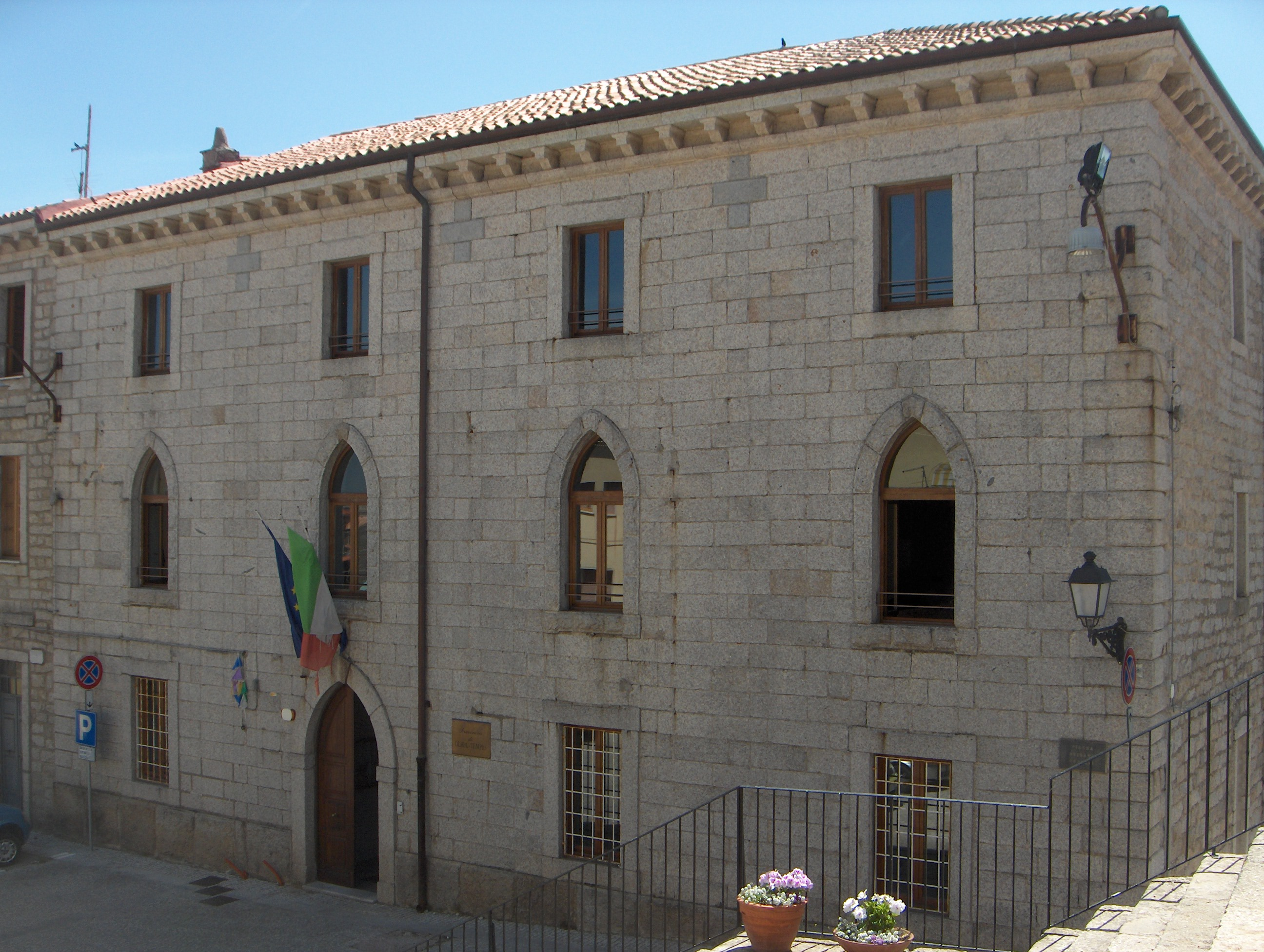
- Former Province Hall in Tempio Pausania

- Coat of arms

- Map highlighting the location of the province of Olbia-Tempio in Italy
- Coordinates: 41°N 9°E
- Country: Italy
- Region: Sardinia
- Established: 2001
- Disestablished: 2016
- Capital(s): Olbia and Tempio Pausania
- Comuni: 26

Area
  - Total: 3,399 km^{2} (1,312 sq mi)

Population (2001)
  - Total: 138,334
  - Density: 40.70/km^{2} (105.4/sq mi)

GDP
  - Total: €3.547 billion (2015)
  - Per capita: €22,147 (2015)
- Time zone: UTC+1 (CET)
  - Summer (DST): UTC+2 (CEST)
- Postal code: 07000-07099
- Telephone prefix: 079-0789
- Vehicle registration: OT
- ISTAT: 104

The province of Olbia-Tempio (Italian: provincia di Olbia-Tempio; Sardinian: provìntzia de Terranòa-Tèmpiu; Gallurese: pruìncia di Tarranoa-Tèmpiu) was a province in the autonomous region of Sardinia, Italy. It had two provincial capitals, Olbia (58,723 inhabitants) and Tempio Pausania (14,342 inhabitants). As of 2015, the province had a total population of 159,950 inhabitants and covered an area of 3,406.18 square kilometres (1,315.13 square miles), so had a population density of 46.96 inhabitants per square kilometer. The province contained 26 comuni (sing.: comune).

The largest comuni in the province were Olbia (population of 45,366 as of 2001), Tempio Pausania (13,992 as of 2001), Arzachena (12,080 as of 2001) and La Maddalena (11,369 as of 2001). The former province of Olbia-Tempio was formed by a 2001 regional law that became effective in 2005. It contained a section of historic Gallura and was bordered by the provinces of Nuoro and Sassari.

On 6 May 2012 the regional referendums of Sardinia took place regarding the abolition of certain provinces and a variety of other matters. The suggestion of reforming or abolishing certain provinces in Sardinia was approved by the Regional Council of Sardinia on 24 May 2012. Due to this, the former province of Olbia-Tempio was ordered to form a new administrative body or be abolished on 1 March 2013, but this expiry date for constitutional changes was extended to 1 July 2013. Olbia-Tempio was suppressed as a province by the 2016 Regional Decree.

In April 2021, under Sardinian Regional Council's Regional Law Nr. 7, the province was restored now under the name of Province of Gallura North-East Sardinia (Provincia della Gallura Nord-Est Sardegna). Whilst the Italian government challenged the law, thus stalling its implementation, on March 12, 2022, the Constitutional Court ruled in favor of the Autonomous Region of Sardinia. On April 13, 2023, the regional council, at the proposal of the regional government, approved an amendment to the 2021 reform, defining the timeframe and manner of its implementation, which would see its full implementation in 2025.

== Government ==
=== List of presidents ===
| | President | Term start | Term end | Party |
|---|---|---|---|---|
| 1 | Anna Pietrina Murrighile | 9 May 2005 | 31 May 2010 | Sardinia Project; Democratic Party |
| 2 | Fedele Sanciu | 31 May 2010 | 1 July 2013 | The People of Freedom |
| – | Francesco Pirari | 1 July 2013 | 30 April 2014 | Special Commissioner |
| – | Giovanni Antonio Carta | 30 April 2014 | 20 April 2016 | Special Commissioner |

=== Provincial elections ===
Olbia-Tempio Provincial Election Results June 2010
| Name | Party | 1st Preference Votes | % |
|---|---|---|---|
| Fedele Sanciu | PdL | 38,156 | 53.2 |
| Gesuino Giovanni Giuliano Achenza | PD | 28,240 | 39.3 |
