= List of mayors of Matera =

Mayor of Matera
- Sindaco di Matera
- Incumbent; Antonio Nicoletti since 10 June 2025
- Appointer: Popular election
- Term length: 5 years, renewable once
- Formation: 1860
- Website: Official website

The mayor of Matera is an elected politician who, along with the Matera City Council, is accountable for the strategic government of Matera in Basilicata, Italy.

== Overview ==
According to the Constitution of Italy, the mayor of Matera is member of the City Council. The mayor is elected by the population of Matera, who also elect the members of the City Council, controlling the mayor's policy guidelines and is able to enforce his resignation by a motion of no confidence. The mayor is entitled to appoint and release the members of his government. Since 1994, the mayor is elected directly by Matera's electorate; in all mayoral elections in Italy in cities with a population higher than 15,000, the voters express a direct choice for the mayor or an indirect choice voting for the party of the candidate's coalition. The election of the City Council is based on a direct choice for the candidate with a preference vote, and the candidate with the majority of the preferences is elected, while the number of the seats for each party is determined proportionally. If no candidate receives at least 50% of votes, the top two candidates go to a second round after two weeks. The first elected mayor from the Five Star Movement was Domenico Bennardi, who took office on 6 October 2020.

From 1946 to 1994, the mayor of Matera, which was elected by the City Council, was always a member of Christian Democracy, the ruling party of post-war Italy, with the exception of Alfonso Pontradolfi of the Italian Socialist Party from 1984 to 1986. From 1957 to 1960 and from 1968 to 1970, there was a Special Prefectural Commissioner tenure. In the 1994 Italian local elections, Mario Manfredi of the centre-left coalition. From 1995 to 2007, Matera was led by a red–red–green coalition, plus Christian democrats. In the 2007 Italian local elections, Emilio Nicola Bucicco of National Alliance, supported by the centre-right coalition, became the first right-wing mayor of Matera. He resigned in 2009, and the city was taken over by a Special Prefectural Commissioner until the 2010 Italian local elections returned the centre-left coalition to power. For the 2015 Italian local elections, the centre-right coalition selected Raffaello De Ruggieri as an independent candidate. He won in an upset and took office on 12 June 2015. After initially being postponed due to the COVID-19 pandemic in Italy, the 2020 Italian local elections saw the win of the Five Star Movement candidate, who took office on 6 October 2020, following his win in the runoff. The centre-left coalition did not make it to runoff, which was between the Five Star Movement and the centre-right coalition.

== Italian Republic (since 1946) ==
=== City Council election (1946–1994) ===
From 1946 to 1994, the mayor of Matera was elected by the city's council.

	Mayor	Term start	Term end	Party
1	Giovanni Padula	1946	1952	DC
2	Giuseppe Lamacchia	1952	1956	DC
3	Francesco Padula	1956	1957	DC
Special Prefectural Commissioner tenure (1957–1960)
4	Ottavio Lonigro	1960	1964	DC
(2)	Giuseppe Lamacchia	1964	1967	DC
5	Michele De Ruggieri	1967	1968	DC
Special Prefectural Commissioner tenure (1968–1970)
6	Francesco Andrea Gallo	1970	1975	DC
(3)	Francesco Padula	1975	1978	DC
7	Antonio Fiamma	1978	1980	DC
8	Francesco Di Caro	1980	1984	DC
9	Alfonso Pontradolfi	1984	1986	PSI
10	Francesco Saverio Acito	1986	1994	DC

=== Direct election (since 1994) ===
Since 1994, under provisions of new local administration law, the mayor of Matera is chosen by direct election, originally every four, then every five years.

	Mayor	Term start	Term end	Party	Coalition	Election
11	Mario Manfredi	28 June 1994	8 June 1998	Ind	PDS • PRC • FdV	1994
12	Angelo Minieri	8 June 1998	27 May 2002	DS	DS • PRC • FdV • PPI	1998
13	Michele Porcari	27 May 2002	11 June 2007	DS	DS • PRC • FdV • DL	2002
14	Emilio Nicola Buccico	11 June 2007	26 October 2009 (Note: Resigned)	AN	FI • AN • UDC	2007
Special Prefectural Commissioner tenure (26 October 2009 – 13 April 2010)
15	Salvatore Adduce	13 April 2010	15 June 2015	PD	PD • IdV • FdV • UDC	2010
16	Raffaello De Ruggieri	15 June 2015	6 October 2020	Ind	FI • PpI • Ind	2015
17	Domenico Bennardi	6 October 2020 (Note: Election postponed due to the COVID-19 pandemic in Italy)	22 October 2024 (Note: Resigned)	M5S	M5S • Volt • EV • PSI	2020
Special Prefectural Commissioner tenure (from 22 October 2024)
18	Antonio Nicoletti	10 June 2025	Incumbent	Ind	FI • FdI • UDC	2025

== See also ==
- List of mayors of Potenza
