= Murder of Emmanuel Chidi =

2016 racially motivated murder in Italy

Emmanuel Chidi Nnamdi
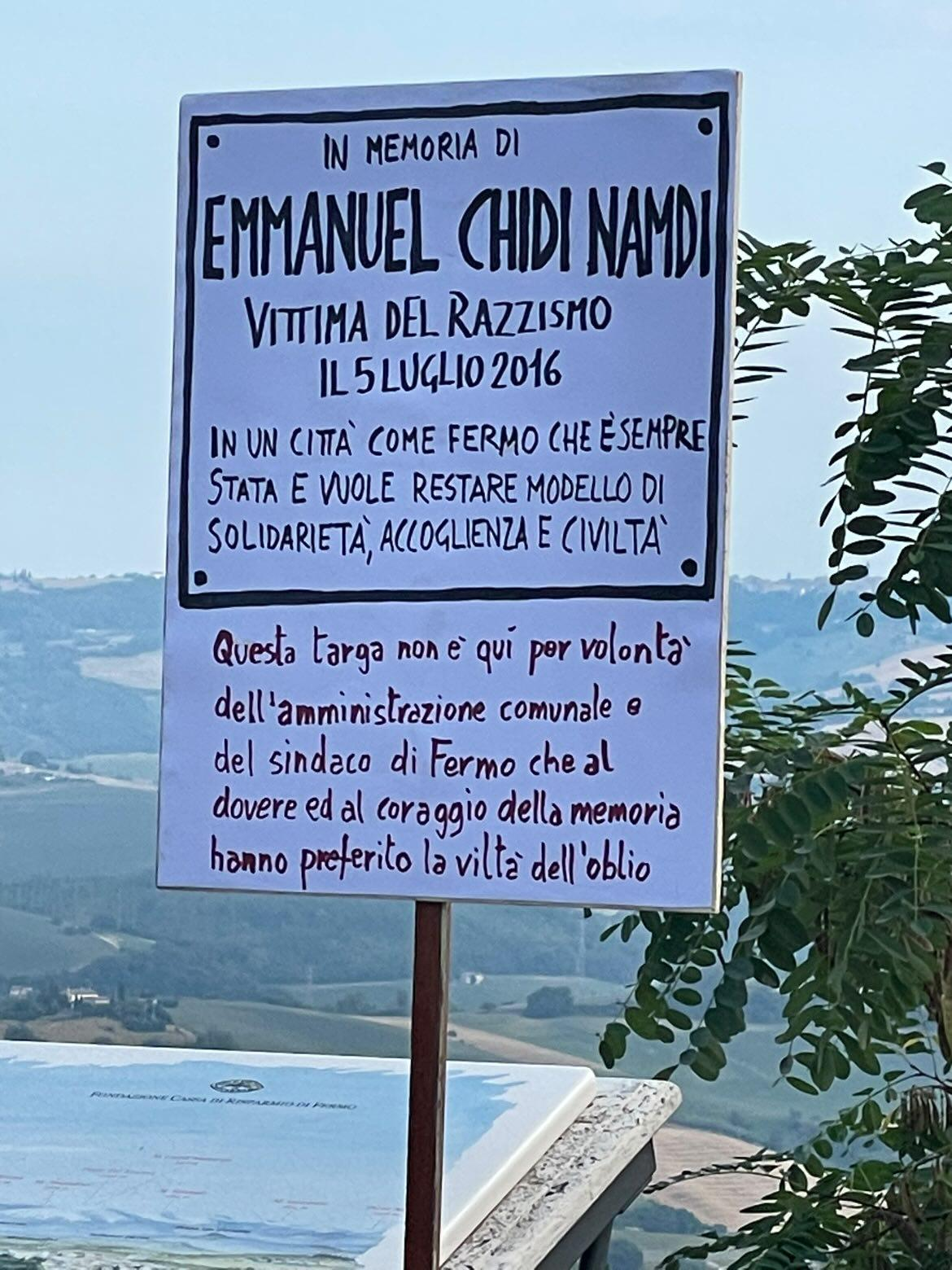
- Memorial placard in Fermo, 2025
- Born: Nigeria
- Died: 5 July 2016 near Fermo, Italy
- Cause of death: Skull fracture
- Known for: Racially motivated murder victim
- Spouse: Chinyery Nnamdi

Emmanuel Chidi Nnamdi was a Nigerian immigrant who fled Nigeria with his partner Chinyery, after their families were killed by the extremist group Boko Haram in 2015. During their journey across the Mediterranean, their baby died. They arrived in Fermo, Italy, in November 2015, where they were taken in by a local Christian charity.

== Murder ==
On July 5, 2016, Nnamdi and Chinyery were walking in Fermo, Italy, when they were subjected to racist abuse by a local man, the 35-year-old Amedeo Mancini, who called Chinyery a "monkey". Nnamdi confronted the man, attacking him with a traffic pole. Mancini fell down under Nnamdi's hits. Chinyery joined the fight, beating Mancini with a shoe of hers. After the beating, the two walked away, leaving the Amedeo on the ground with several injuries. He stood up after half a minute, chased Nnamdi and hit him with a single punch. Nnamdi then lost his balance, hit his head on the edge of the sidewalk, fell into a coma, and later died in a hospital the following day, due to fractured skull. Mancini was arrested on suspicion of racially aggravated manslaughter. Mancini's lawyer later claimed in court that he acted in self-defense and did not intend to kill Emmanuel. After a few months, Mancini left prison and continued to work as a farmer.

== Reaction ==
The murder was widely condemned in Italy and across Europe. Prime Minister Matteo Renzi and other government officials denounced the killing, using the hashtag "#Emmanuel" on social media. Interior Minister Angelino Alfano visited Fermo, emphasizing the need to combat racism and announcing that Chinyery had been granted refugee status. Minister for Parliamentary Relations Maria Elena Boschi expressed solidarity with Chinyery, stating that she had "the embrace of all Italy".

Local churches working with migrants had been targeted by small bombs, according to Father Vinicio Albanesi. The European Network Against Racism (ENAR) condemned the killing, highlighting it as part of a broader pattern of racist violence in Europe. ENAR called for urgent action against hate crime, hate speech, and Afrophobia, criticizing the European Union and its member states for failing to address rising racism and xenophobia. ENAR's Chair, Amel Yacef, emphasized the need for Europe to take racism and violence seriously, framing the murder as a wake-up call for the continent.

Paolo Calcinaro, the mayor of Fermo, stated that the town had a history of welcoming outsiders and had not previously encountered racism. He urged Europe to provide more support to Italy in coping with the arrival of migrants and emphasized the importance of vigilance against increasing racism. Cécile Kyenge, an MEP and Italy's first black minister, called for a political and cultural shift in the country, noting that politicians' racist statements have a harmful impact on society.

== Legacy ==
The 5 July Committee, which was established after the killing of Emmanuel, commemorates his death each year by holding events to honor his memory and promote inclusivity and human rights.

== See also ==
- Racism in Italy
- George Floyd protests in Italy
