= 2020 Italian local elections =

The 2020 Italian local elections were held on different dates; they were originally scheduled to take place in May 2020, together with the 2020 regional elections, with a second round in June, but they were delayed on 20 and 21 September with a second round on 4 and 5 October due to the coronavirus pandemic in Italy. Direct elections were held in 1,172 out of 7,904 municipalities; in each of these, the mayor and the members of the City Council are going to be elected. Of the 1,172 municipalities, 18 are provincial capitals.

The elections in Trentino-Alto Adige/Südtirol were planned to be held on 3 May, with a second ballot on 17 May, while the elections in Aosta Valley were planned on 17 May, with a second ballot on 31 May, but they were delayed following the coronavirus pandemic. In Sicily the elections were planned to be held on 24 May but they were first postponed on 14 June with a second round on 28 June and then they were delayed again sometime between 11 October and 6 December.

Municipal councillors and mayors ordinarily serve a term of five years.

== Voting system ==
All mayoral elections in Italy in cities with a population higher than 15,000 use the same voting system. Under this system, voters express a direct choice for the mayor or an indirect choice voting for the party of the candidate's coalition. If no candidate receives at least 50% of votes, the top two candidates go to a second round after two weeks. This gives a result whereby the winning candidate may be able to claim majority support, although it is not guaranteed.

The election of the City Council is based on a direct choice for the candidate with a preference vote: the candidate with the majority of the preferences is elected. The number of seats for each party is determined proportionally.

== Municipal elections ==
=== Overall results ===
Majority of each coalition in the municipalities which have a population higher than 15,000 inhabitants:

Coalition	Comuni
Centre-left coalition	48 / 133
Independents and civic lists	38 / 133
Centre-right coalition	33 / 133
Five Star Movement	3 / 133
Others	11 / 133

=== Mayoral election results ===
Centre-left coalition
Centre-right coalition
Five Star Movement
Centrist coalition
Civic lists
Prefectural commissioner

Region	City	Population	Incumbent mayor	Elected mayor	1st round		2nd round		Seats	Source
Region	City	Population	Incumbent mayor	Elected mayor	Votes	%	Votes	%	Seats	Source
Aosta Valley	Aosta	34,008	Fulvio Centoz (PD)	Gianni Nuti (Ind.)	6,361	38.84	6,794	53.34	16 / 27	
Lombardy	Lecco	48,333	Virginio Brivio (PD)	Mauro Gattinoni (Ind.)	10,096	41.67	10,978	50.07	20 / 32	
Lombardy	Mantua	49,403	Mattia Palazzi (PD)	Mattia Palazzi (PD)	16,546	70.75	—	—	24 / 32	
Trentino-Alto Adige	Bolzano	107,914	Renzo Caramaschi (Ind.)	Renzo Caramaschi (Ind.)	16,124	33.96	21,585	57.18	23 / 45	
Trentino-Alto Adige	Trento	118,288	Alessandro Andreatta (PD)	Franco Ianeselli (Ind.)	31,885	54.66	—	—	25 / 40	
Veneto	Venice	260,520	Luigi Brugnaro (Ind.)	Luigi Brugnaro (Ind.)	66,750	54.14	—	—	22 / 36	
Tuscany	Arezzo	99,179	Alessandro Ghinelli (Ind.)	Alessandro Ghinelli (Ind.)	23,638	47.08	23,620	54.50	20 / 32	
Marche	Fermo	37,119	Paolo Calcinaro (Ind.)	Paolo Calcinaro (Ind.)	14,314	71.41	—	—	23 / 32	
Marche	Macerata	41,514	Romano Carancini (PD)	Sandro Parcaroli (Lega)	12,113	52.78	—	—	20 / 32	
Abruzzo	Chieti	50,646	Umberto Di Primio (FdI)	Diego Ferrara (PD)	6,183	21.50	12,403	55.85	19 / 32	
Apulia	Andria	99,671	Gaetano Tufariello (Note: Prefectural commissioner replacing mayor Nicola Giorgino (FI) since 29 April 2019)	Giovanna Bruno (PD)	20,037	38.10	21,717	58.87	20 / 32	
Apulia	Trani	55,851	Amedeo Bottaro (PD)	Amedeo Bottaro (PD)	20,785	65.43	—	—	21 / 32	
Basilicata	Matera	60,404	Raffaello De Ruggieri (Ind.)	Domenico Bennardi (M5S)	9,525	27.57	18,830	67.54	20 / 32	
Calabria	Crotone	65,086	Tiziana Costantino (Note: Prefectural commissioner replacing mayor Ugo Pugliese (UDC) since 4 December 2019)	Vincenzo Voce (Ind.)	12,003	36.22	16,434	63.95	20 / 32	
Calabria	Reggio Calabria	180,369	Giuseppe Falcomatà (PD)	Giuseppe Falcomatà (PD)	35,109	37.17	44,069	58.36	20 / 32	
Sicily	Agrigento	58,956	Calogero Firetto (UDC)	Francesco Miccichè (Ind.)	11,564	36.68	13,156	60.43	14 / 24	
Sicily	Enna	27,004	Maurizio Dipietro (IV) (Note: Centre-right independent politician until 2019)	Maurizio Dipietro (IV)	9,484	58.27	—	—	17 / 24	
Sardinia	Nuoro	36,154	Andrea Soddu (Ind.)	Andrea Soddu (Ind.)	5,068	28.84	8,841	67.00	15 / 24	

== See also ==
- 2020 Venice municipal election
