= 2015 Italian local elections =

The 2015 Italian local elections were to be held on 31 May, with a second round on 14 June, concurrently with the Regional elections. In Italy, direct elections were held in 1,063 municipalities: in each municipality (comune) were chosen mayor and members of the City Council. Of the 1,603 municipalities, 15 were provincial capitals and 120 had a population higher than 15,000 inhabitants.

In Trentino-Alto Adige and Aosta Valley the elections were held on 10 May with a second ballot on 24 May.

Municipal councilors and mayors ordinarily serve a terms of five years.

== Voting System ==
All mayoral elections in Italy in cities with a population higher than 15,000 use the same system.

Under this system voters express a direct choice for the mayor or an indirect choice voting for one of the parties of the candidate's coalition.

If no candidate receives a majority of votes, the top two candidates go to a second round two weeks later. The coalition of the elected mayor is guaranteed a majority of seats in the council with the attribution of extra seats, but the majority bonus system is not adopted by the cities of Trentino-Alto Adige. If a Mayor resigns, dies or is ousted from office after more than half the municipal councillors stepped down, an early municipal election (for the Mayor and for all municipal councillors) is called.

The City Council is elected at the same time as the mayor. Voters can vote for a list of candidates and can express up to 2 preferences for candidates of said list. In case of two preferences, they must be given to candidates of both genders. Seats are the attributed to parties proportionally, and for each party list the candidates with the highest number of preferences are elected.

== Results ==
Majority of each coalition in 120 municipalities (comuni) with a population higher than 15,000:

Coalition	Comuni
Centre-left coalition	41
Centre-right coalition	24
Five Star Movement	5
Independents and others	45

- Centre-left coalition: Trento, Bolzano, Aosta, Riva del Garda, San Giovanni in Fiore, Siderno, Cardito, Ercolano, San Giorgio a Cremano, Zagarolo, Senigallia, Moncalieri, Manfredonia, Pedara, Agrigento, Bollate, Lecco, Mantua, Segrate, Somma Lombardo, Cava de' Tirreni, Frattamaggiore, Marigliano, Mugnano di Napoli, San Nicola la Strada, Faenza, Albano Laziale, Colleferro, Macerata, Valenza, Trani, Casamassima, Mola di Bari, San Vito dei Normanni, Quartu Sant'Elena, Marsala, Bronte, Carini, Ispica, Milazzo, San Giovanni la Punta.
- Centre-right coalition: Laives, Pomigliano d'Arco, Vibo Valentia, Bondeno, Fondi, Parabiago, Samarate, Capurso, Ceglie Messapica, Andria, Chieti, Matera, Gioia Tauro, Lamezia Terme, Caivano, Carovigno, Oria, Sestu, Arezzo, Pietrasanta, Viareggio, Enna, Barcellona Pozzo di Gotto, Licata.
- Five Star Movement: Quarto, Porto Torres, Venaria Reale, Gela, Augusta.
- Independent and others: Merano, Rovereto, Grumo Nevano, Orta di Atella, Sorrento, Mascali, Mussomeli, Nicosia, Raffadali, Trabia, Sanluri, Tempio Pausania, Angri, Bacoli, Casalnuovo di Napoli, Casavatore, Eboli, Giugliano in Campania, Terzigno, Ceccano, Fermo, Altamura, Cerignola, Latiano, Mesagne, Modugno, Nuoro, Silius, Ribera, Tremestieri Etneo.

=== Mayoral election results ===
Region	City	Population	Incumbent mayor	Elected mayor	1st round		2nd round		Seats	Source
Region	City	Population	Incumbent mayor	Elected mayor	Votes	%	Votes	%	Seats	Source
Aosta Valley	Aosta	35,031	Bruno Giordano (UV)	Fulvio Centoz (PD)	8,935	54.18	—N/a	—N/a	18 / 30	
Lombardy	Lecco	48,174	Virginio Brivio (PD)	Virginio Brivio (PD)	8,251	39.21	9,676	54.38	20 / 32	
Lombardy	Mantua	48,684	Nicola Sodano (FI)	Mattia Palazzi (PD)	9,435	46.50	9,966	62.56	20 / 32	
Trentino-Alto Adige	Bolzano	106,075	Luigi Spagnolli (PD)	Luigi Spagnolli (PD)	17,983	41.58	17,630	57.70	19 / 45	
Trentino-Alto Adige	Trento	117,311	Alessandro Andreatta (PD)	Alessandro Andreatta (PD)	26,420	53.70	—N/a	—N/a	24 / 40	
Veneto	Rovigo	50,590	Claudio Ventrice	Massimo Bergamin (LN)	4,630	18.64	10,264	59.72	20 / 32	
Veneto	Venice	264,919	Vittorio Zappalorto	Luigi Brugnaro (Ind.)	34,790	28.56	54,405	53.21	22 / 36	
Tuscany	Arezzo	99,392	Stefano Gasperini (PD)	Alessandro Ghinelli (Ind.)	15,393	35.98	18,651	50.83	20 / 32	
Marche	Fermo	37,834	Vittorio Saladino	Paolo Calcinaro (Ind.)	4,255	22.90	10,067	69.92	20 / 32	
Marche	Macerata	41,625	Romano Carancini (PD)	Romano Carancini (PD)	8,163	39.92	8,042	59.11	20 / 32	
Abruzzo	Chieti	52,218	Umberto Di Primio (NCD)	Umberto Di Primio (NCD)	10,606	37.00	12,063	55.01	20 / 32	
Apulia	Andria	100,459	Nicola Giorgino (FI)	Nicola Giorgino (FI)	30,073	52.24	—N/a	—N/a	20 / 32	
Apulia	Trani	55,810	Maria Rita Iaculli	Amedeo Bottaro (PD)	14,517	47.48	13,324	75.79	20 / 32	
Basilicata	Matera	60,505	Salvatore Adduce (PD)	Raffaello De Ruggieri (Ind.)	12,970	36.00	15,448	54.51	20 / 32	
Calabria	Vibo Valentia	33,609	Nicola D'Agostino (FI)	Elio Costa (Ind.)	10,327	50.80	—N/a	—N/a	20 / 32	
Sicily	Agrigento	60,075	Luciana Giammanco	Lillo Firetto (UDC)	16,594	59.01	—N/a	—N/a	21 / 30	
Sicily	Enna	28,280	Paolo Garofalo (PD)	Maurizio Dipietro (Ind.)	3,561	24.36	7,425	51.89	8 / 30	
Sardinia	Nuoro	37,358	Alessandro Bianchi (PD)	Andrea Soddu (Ind.)	4,219	21.45	10,482	68.39	20 / 32	

=== City councils ===
City	PD	FI	LN	SEL	M5S	FdI	NCD	Others
Trento	19	1	5	0	2	0	3	6
Bolzano	12	2	5	3	4	1	0	18
Aosta	5	0	2	1	2	0	0	17
Venice	7	3	1	0	2	0	2	17
Mantua	18	5	2	2	1	0	0	0
Lecco	20	1	4	0	0	0	3	0
Rovigo	4	6	9	0	1	0	4	2
Arezzo	8	13	5	1	1	2	0	0
Macerata	16	3	0	2	2	2	2	0
Fermo	3	2	0	1	1	0	0	20
Chieti	7	12	0	0	1	0	8	0
Trani	17	1	0	2	1	1	3	2
Andria	6	17	1	2	4	0	2	0
Matera	10	2	0	0	0	0	1	17
Vibo Valentia	10	0	0	0	0	0	0	20
Agrigento	7	7	0	0	2	0	14	0
