= Sodano =

Sodano is a surname. Notable people with the surname include:

- Angelo Sodano (1927–2022), Italian Cardinal of the Catholic Church
- Frankie Sodano (1931–2015), American boxer
- Calogero Sodano (born 1946), Italian mayor
- Nicola Sodano (born 1978), Italian politician
- Vittorio Sodano (born 1974), Italian make-up artist
