= Fenu =

Fenu may refer to:

- Emiliano Fenu (born 1977), Italian politician
- Far Eastern Federal University
