= 2020 Venice municipal election =

Italian election

- 20–21 September 2020
- Turnout: 62.2% (▲2.4%)
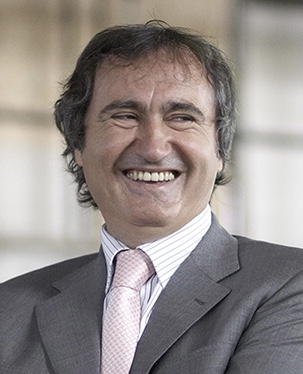

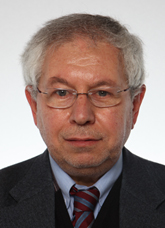

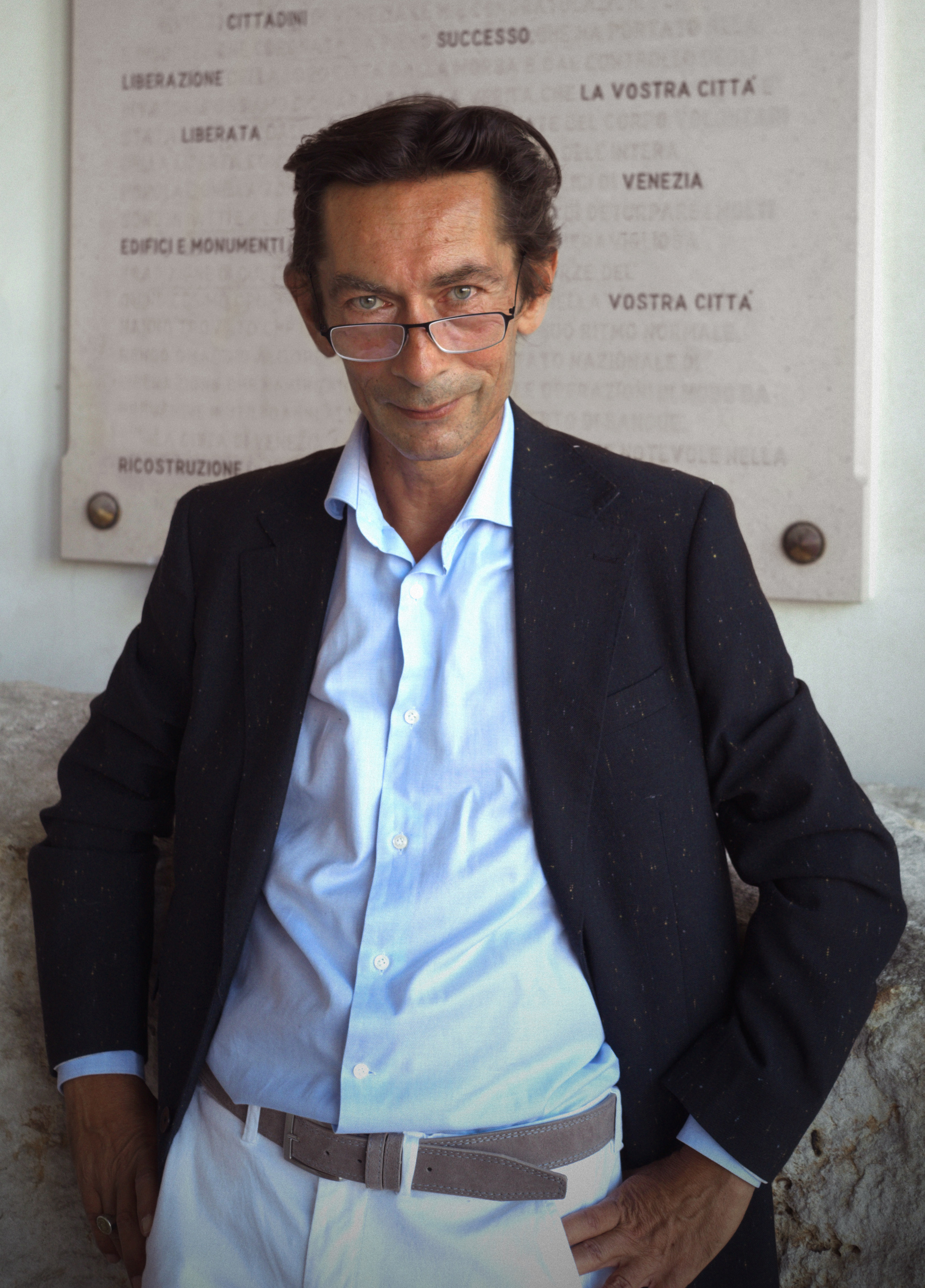
Candidate	Luigi Brugnaro	Pier Paolo Baretta	Marco Gasparinetti
Party	Independent	Democratic Party	Independent
Alliance	Centre-right	Centre-left
Popular vote	66,750	36,092	5,005
Percentage	54.14%	29.27%	4.06%
Mayor before election
Luigi Brugnaro
Centre-right
Elected mayor
Luigi Brugnaro
Centre-right

A Municipal election was held in Venice, Italy, on 20 and 21 September. It was originally scheduled to take place on May 31, 2020, but it was delayed due to the coronavirus pandemic in Italy.

== Electoral system ==
The voting system is used for all mayoral elections in Italy, in the cities with a population higher than 15,000 inhabitants. Under this system, voters express a direct choice for the mayor or an indirect choice voting for the party of the candidate's coalition. If no candidate receives 50% of votes during the first round, the top two candidates go to a second round after two weeks. The winning candidate obtains a majority bonus equal to 60% of seats. During the first round, if no candidate gets more than 50% of votes but a coalition of lists gets the majority of 50% of votes or if the mayor is elected in the first round but its coalition gets less than 40% of the valid votes, the majority bonus cannot be assigned to the coalition of the winning mayor candidate.

The election of the City Council is based on a direct choice for the candidate with a maximum of two preferential votes, each for a different gender, belonging to the same party list: the candidate with the majority of the preferences is elected. The number of the seats for each party is determined proportionally, using D'Hondt seat allocation. Only coalitions with more than 3% of votes are eligible to get any seats.

== Parties and candidates ==
This is a list of the parties (and their respective leaders) which will participate in the election.

Political force or alliance	Constituent lists	Leader
Centre-right coalition	Forza Italia (FI)	Luigi Brugnaro
Centre-right coalition	League (Lega)	Luigi Brugnaro
Centre-right coalition	Brothers of Italy (FdI)	Luigi Brugnaro
Centre-right coalition	Luigi Brugnaro for Mayor	Luigi Brugnaro
Centre-left coalition	Democratic Party (PD)	Pier Paolo Baretta
Centre-left coalition	Green Progressive Venice (incl. Art.1, EV, SI, Pos and PRC)	Pier Paolo Baretta
Centre-left coalition	Venice is Yours (incl. IV, +E and PSI)	Pier Paolo Baretta
Centre-left coalition	Common Idea for Venice and Mestre	Pier Paolo Baretta
Centre-left coalition	Turning Point in Common (incl. Volt and IiC)	Pier Paolo Baretta
Five Star Movement (M5S)		Sara Visman
All the City Together! (TCI) (incl. PaP)		Giovanni Andrea Martini
Earth and Water 2020 (TeA)		Marco Gasparinetti
Party of Venetians (PdV)		Stefano Zecchi
Solidary and Young Italy (IGS)		Maurizio Callegari
Sitran Civic List		Marco Sitran

== Opinion polls ==
=== Candidates ===
Date	Polling firm/ Client	Sample size	Brugnaro	Baretta	Visman	Martini	Zecchi	Gasparinetti	Others	Undecided	Lead
10 Aug 2020	Fabbrica Politica (Note: This poll was commissioned by a political party.)	500	55.0	24.3	5.4 (Note: In this poll the M5S mayoral candidate was Elena La Rocca)	5.6	7.1	2.6	—N/a	—N/a	30.7

=== Parties ===
Date	Polling firm	Sample size	Centre-right				Centre-left				M5S	TCI	TeA	PdV	Others	Undecided	Lead
Date	Polling firm	Sample size	Lega	FI	FdI	Other	PD	IV	VVP	Other	M5S	TCI	TeA	PdV	Others	Undecided	Lead
16 Jun 2020	Quorum	900	22.6	3.9	7.8	21.1	23.2	1.7	1.7	0.4	5.0	2.4	5.2	3.0	2.0	53.1	0.6

== Results ==
Summary of the 20–21 September 2020 Venice City Council election results
Candidates	Votes	%	Leaders seats	Parties	Votes	%	Seats
Luigi Brugnaro	66,750	54.14	–	Luigi Brugnaro for Mayor	37,914	31.67	14
Luigi Brugnaro	66,750	54.14	–	League – Venetian League	14,806	12.37	5
Luigi Brugnaro	66,750	54.14	–	Brothers of Italy	7,855	6.56	2
Luigi Brugnaro	66,750	54.14	–	Forza Italia	3,255	2.72	1
Luigi Brugnaro	66,750	54.14	–	The Cities	1,148	0.96	–
Pier Paolo Baretta	36,092	29.27	1	Democratic Party	22,962	19.18	7
Pier Paolo Baretta	36,092	29.27	1	Green Progressive Venice	5,907	4.93	1
Pier Paolo Baretta	36,092	29.27	1	Venice is Yours (+Eu – IV – PSI)	4,308	3.60	1
Pier Paolo Baretta	36,092	29.27	1	Turning Point in Common (Volt – IiC)	952	0.80	–
Pier Paolo Baretta	36,092	29.27	1	Common Idea	789	0.66	–
Marco Gasparinetti	5,005	4.06	1	Earth and Water 2020	4,847	4.05	–
Sara Visman	4,822	3.91	1	Five Star Movement	4,716	3.94	–
Stefano Zecchi	4,344	3.52	1	Party of Venetians	4,228	3.53	–
Giovanni Andrea Martini	4,305	3.49	1	All the City Together!	3,021	2.52	–
Giovanni Andrea Martini	4,305	3.49	1	For Mestre and Venice	1,083	0.90	–
Alessandro Busetto	807	0.65	–	Workers' Communist Party	783	0.65	–
Marco Sitran	605	0.49	–	Sitran Civic List	553	0.46	–
Maurizio Callegari	570	0.46	–	Solidary and Young Italy – Vox – Human Value Party	570	0.48	–
Total	123,300	100.00	5		119,697	100.00	31
Source: Ministry of the Interior

== See also ==
- 2020 Italian local elections
