= Vladimiro Crisafulli =

Italian politician (born 1950)

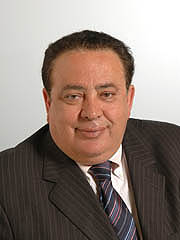

Mayor of Enna
- Incumbent
- Assumed office 27 May 2026
- Preceded by: Maurizio Dipietro

Member of the Senate of the Republic
- In office 29 April 2008 – 14 March 2013
- Constituency: Sicily

Member of the Chamber of Deputies
- In office 28 April 2006 – 28 April 2008
- Constituency: Sicily

Vice president of the Sicilian Regional Assembly
- In office 25 July 2001 – 29 June 2006

Member of the Sicilian Regional Assembly
- In office 16 July 1991 – 29 June 2006
- Constituency: Enna

Personal details
- Born: 28 December 1950 (age 75) Enna, Italy
- Party: PCI (before 1991); PDS (1991–1998); DS (1998–2007); PD (since 2007)

Vladimiro Crisafulli (born 28 December 1950) is an Italian politician serving as mayor of Enna since May 2026. He was a member of the Chamber of Deputies from 2006 to 2008 and of the Senate of the Republic from 2008 to 2013. He also served as vice president of the Sicilian Regional Assembly between 2001 and 2006.
