= Mario Perantoni =

Italian politician (born 1964)

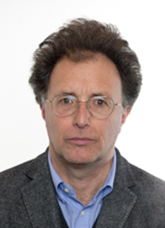
- Perantoni in 2018

Member of the Chamber of Deputies
- Incumbent
- Assumed office 22 July 2025
- Preceded by: Emiliano Fenu
- Constituency: Sardinia – P01
- In office 23 March 2018 – 12 October 2022
- Constituency: Sardinia – U04

Personal details
- Born: 6 March 1964 (age 62)
- Party: Five Star Movement (since 2018)

Mario Perantoni (born 6 March 1964) is an Italian politician. He has been a member of the Chamber of Deputies since 2025, having previously served from 2018 to 2022. From 2020 to 2022, he served as chairman of the Justice Committee.
