= Bruno Pilia =

Italian politician (born 1956)

President of the Province of Ogliastra
- In office 31 May 2010 – 1 July 2013
- Preceded by: Pier Luigi Carta
- Succeeded by: Antonello Ghiani (commissioner)

Personal details
- Born: 12 June 1956 (age 70) Ilbono, Sardinia, Italy
- Party: Democratic Party
- Education: University of Cagliari
- Occupation: Radiologist

Bruno Pilia (born 12 June 1956) is an Italian physician and politician of the Democratic Party who served as president of the Province of Ogliastra from 2010 to 2013.

== Life and career ==
Pilia was born in Ilbono, Sardinia, in 1956. He graduated in medicine and surgery from the University of Cagliari in 1981 and specialized in radiology in 1986. He began his medical career in the Nostra Signora della Mercede Hospital in Lanusei and subsequently became director of its radiology unit.

Pilia entered local politics in Lanusei in 1990, initially as a member of Christian Democracy. He served as a councillor from 1990 to 2000 and as a municipal assessor from 1992 to 1995.

In the 2010 provincial elections, Pilia was the centre-left candidate for president of the Province of Ogliastra. He was supported by the Democratic Party, Italian Socialist Party, Left Ecology Freedom, Italy of Values, the Federation of the Left, Red Moors, the UdC, and a civic list. He was elected at the runoff against centre-right candidate Sandro Rubio with 50.98% of the vote.

Pilia served as provincial president until July 2013, when the province was placed under a regional commissioner.

== Personal life ==
Pilia was married to Silvia Piu, an employee at the health agency in Tortolì, with whom he had two children, Anna Laura and Gianluca. Piu died suddenly on 6 January 2025, aged 47, five months after the death of their ten-year-old daughter Anna Laura, who died in a drowning accident at Arbatax on 8 August 2024.
