= Amedeo Bottaro =

Italian politician

Mayor of Trani
- In office 19 June 2015 – 12 June 2026
- Preceded by: Luigi Nicola Riserbato
- Succeeded by: Marco Galiano

Personal details
- Born: 1 May 1971 (age 55) Naples, Campania, Italy
- Party: Democratic Party
- Education: University of Bari
- Profession: Lawyer

Amedeo Bottaro (born 1 May 1971) is an Italian politician.

== Life and career ==
Bottaro was born in Naples on 1 May 1971. He graduated at the University of Bari in 1996, and opened his own law firm in the city of Trani, Apulia, in 2009. He is a member of the Democratic Party and was elected Mayor of Trani at the 2015 Italian local elections. He took office on 19 June 2015.

He was re-elected for a second term at the 2020 Italian local elections.

== See also ==
- 2015 Italian local elections
- 2020 Italian local elections
- List of mayors of Trani

Political offices
| Preceded by Luigi Nicola Riserbato | Mayor of Trani; 2015–2026 | Succeeded by Marco Galiano |
