= List of mayors of Chieti =

Mayor of Chieti
- Sindaco di Chieti

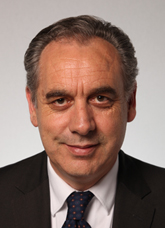
- Incumbent; Giovanni Legnini (PD) since 10 June 2026
- Appointer: Popular election
- Term length: 5 years, renewable once
- Formation: 1799
- Website: Official website

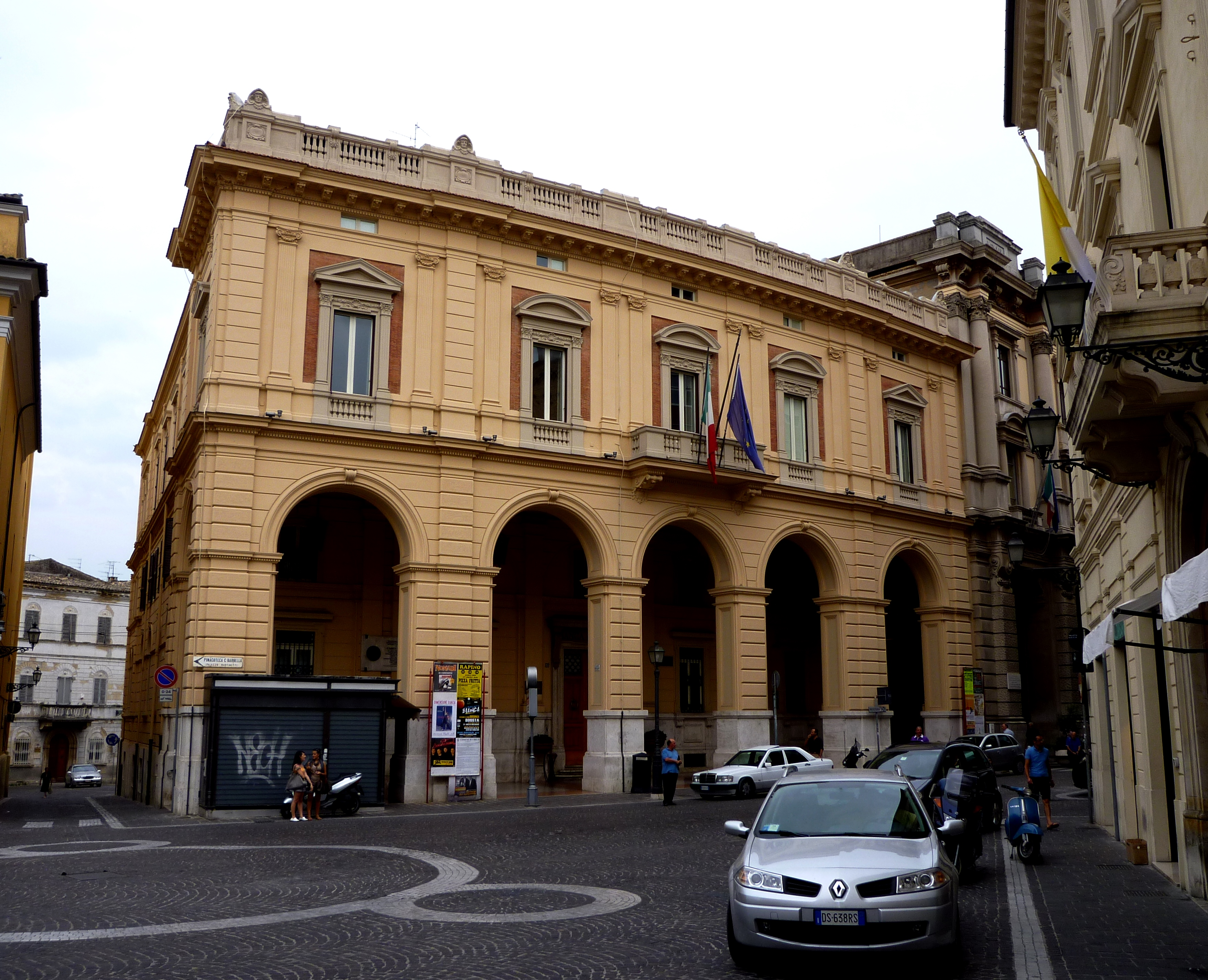
Chieti's City Hall.

The mayor of Chieti is an elected politician who, along with the Chieti's city council, is accountable for the strategic government of Chieti in Abruzzo, Italy.

The current mayor is Giovanni Legnini (PD), who took office on 10 June 2026.

== Overview ==
According to the Italian Constitution, the mayor of Chieti is member of the city council.

The mayor is elected by the population of Chieti, who also elects the members of the city council, controlling the mayor's policy guidelines and is able to enforce his resignation by a motion of no confidence. The mayor is entitled to appoint and release the members of his government.

Since 1993 the mayor is elected directly by Chieti's electorate: in all mayoral elections in Italy in cities with a population higher than 15,000 the voters express a direct choice for the mayor or an indirect choice voting for the party of the candidate's coalition. If no candidate receives at least 50% of votes, the top two candidates go to a second round after two weeks. The election of the City Council is based on a direct choice for the candidate with a preference vote: the candidate with the majority of the preferences is elected. The number of the seats for each party is determined proportionally.

== List ==
=== Italian Republic (since 1946) ===
==== City Council election (1946–1993) ====
From 1946 to 1993, the Mayor of Chieti was elected by the City Council.

	Mayor	Term start	Term end	Party
1	Antonio Mariani	20 April 1946	30 June 1956	DC
2	Lelio Sanità di Toppi	30 June 1956	19 November 1960	DC
3	Nicola Buracchio	19 November 1960	10 October 1967	DC
4	Fulvio Di Bernardo	December 1967	30 June 1970	DC
5	Arduino Roccioletti	July 1970	April 1976	DC
6	Angelo Zito	May 1976	July 1985	DC
7	Luigi Capozucco	July 1985	November 1985	DC
8	Veniero Di Petta	November 1985	October 1987	DC
9	Andrea Buracchio	November 1987	March 1993	DC

==== Direct election (since 1993) ====
Since 1993, under provisions of new local administration law, the Mayor of Chieti is chosen by direct election, originally every four, then every five years.

	Mayor	Term start	Term end	Party	Coalition	Election
10	Nicola Cucullo	6 December 1993	17 November 1997	MSI; MSFT	MSI	1993
10	Nicola Cucullo	17 November 1997	27 January 2000 (Note: Ousted out of office after losing the majority in the City Council.)	MSI; MSFT	AN • MSFT • FI • CCD	1997
Special Prefectural Commissioner tenure (27 January 2000 – 1 May 2000)
(10)	Nicola Cucullo	1 May 2000	12 November 2004 (Note: City Council suspended.)	MSFT	AN • MSFT • FI • CDU	2000
Special Prefectural Commissioner tenure (12 November 2004 – 19 April 2005)
11	Francesco Ricci	19 April 2005	30 March 2010	DL	DL • DS • PRC • SDI	2005
12	Umberto Di Primio	30 March 2010	19 June 2015	PdL; FI	PdL • UDC • MpA	2010
12	Umberto Di Primio	19 June 2015	8 October 2020	PdL; FI	FI • UDC • NCD	2015
13	Diego Ferrara	8 October 2020 (Note: Election originally scheduled for June 2020 then postponed due to the COVID-19 pandemic in Italy.)	10 June 2026	PD	PD • SI	2020
14	Giovanni Legnini	10 June 2026 (Note: Election originally scheduled for October 2025 then postponed to May 2026. According to the Italian law, since 2011 local elections can take place each year only between 15 April and 15 June.)	Incumbent	PD	PD • AVS • M5S	2026
