= Giovanni Legnini =

Italian lawyer and politician

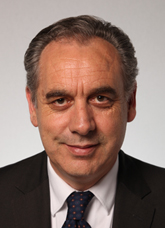

Mayor of Chieti
- Incumbent
- Assumed office 10 June 2026
- Preceded by: Diego Ferrara

Vice president of the CSM
- In office 30 September 2014 – 27 September 2018
- Preceded by: Michele Vietti
- Succeeded by: David Ermini

Member of the Chamber of Deputies
- In office 15 March 2013 – 26 September 2014
- Constituency: Abruzzo

Member of the Senate of the Republic
- In office 26 July 2004 – 14 March 2013
- Constituency: Abruzzo

Mayor of Roccamontepiano
- In office 31 May 1990 – 28 May 2002
- Preceded by: Trentino Marinelli
- Succeeded by: Adamo Carulli

Personal details
- Born: 6 January 1959 (age 67) Roccamontepiano, Italy
- Party: PCI (till 1991); PDS (1991–1998); DS (1998–2007); PD (since 2007)
- Education: University of Teramo
- Occupation: Lawyer, politician

Giovanni Legnini (born 6 January 1959) is an Italian lawyer and politician, former vice president of the High Council of the Judiciary.

== Life and career ==
Legnini graduated with a degree in law from the University of Teramo, and began his career as a lawyer in Chieti, Abruzzo.

From 1990 to 2002, Legnini was mayor of his hometown Roccamontepiano, supported by the Alliance of Progressives first and by The Olive Tree later.

In 2004, Legnini entered the Senate, taking over the seat of Ottaviano Del Turco who was elected to the European Parliament. Legnini was later re-confirmed to the Senate in 2006 and 2008 and was elected to the Chamber of Deputies in 2013.

After having been undersecretary in the Letta Cabinet and the Renzi Cabinet, Legnini was elected to the High Council of the Judiciary, and on 30 September 2014 was appointed vice president of the CSM.

In June 2026, Legnini was elected mayor of Chieti.

Political offices
Preceded by Diego Ferrara	Mayor of Chieti since 2026	Incumbent
