= List of mayors of Enna =

Mayor of Enna
- Sindaco di Enna

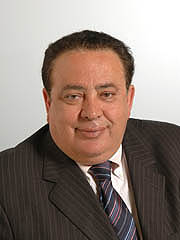
- Incumbent; Vladimiro Crisafulli since 27 May 2026
- Appointer: Popular election
- Term length: 5 years, renewable once
- Formation: 1860
- Website: Official website

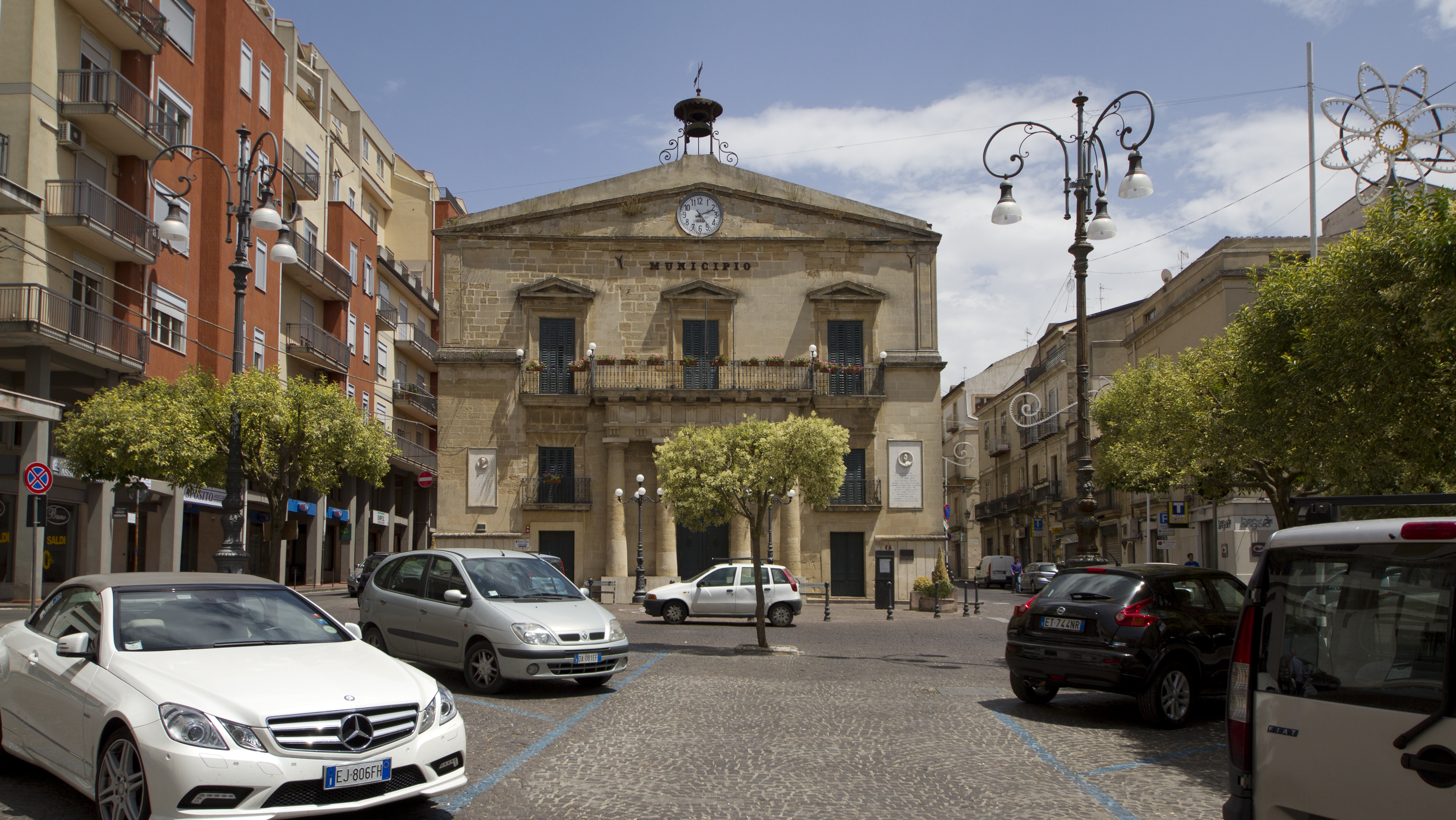
Enna's Town Hall.

The Mayor of Enna is an elected politician who, along with the Enna City Council, is accountable for the strategic government of Enna in Sicily, Italy.

The current mayor is Vladimiro Crisafulli (PD), who took office on 27 May 2026.

== Overview ==
According to the Italian Constitution, the mayor of Enna is member of the City Council.

The mayor is elected by the population of Enna, who also elects the members of the City Council, controlling the mayor's policy guidelines and is able to enforce his resignation by a motion of no confidence. The mayor is entitled to appoint and release the members of his government.

Since 1994 the mayor is elected directly by Enna's electorate: in all mayoral elections in Italy in cities with a population higher than 15,000 the voters express a direct choice for the mayor or an indirect choice voting for the party of the candidate's coalition. If no candidate receives at least 50% of votes, the top two candidates go to a second round after two weeks. The election of the City Council is based on a direct choice for the candidate with a preference vote: the candidate with the majority of the preferences is elected. The number of the seats for each party is determined proportionally.

== Italian Republic (since 1946) ==
=== City Council election (1946–1994) ===
From 1946 to 1994, the Mayor of Enna was elected by the City Council.

	Mayor	Term start	Term end	Party
1	Paolo Savoca	1946	1952	PRI
2	Paolo Lo Manto	1952	1958	PLI
3	Giovambattista Grimaldi	1958	1959	PCI
4	Vittorio Ugo Colajanni	1959	1960	PRI
(2)	Paolo Lo Manto	1960	1962	PLI
5	Giovanni Rosso	1962	1968	DC
(2)	Paolo Lo Manto	1968	1973	PLI
6	Aldo Alerci	1973	1979	DC
7	Michele Lauria	1979	1987	DC
8	Vito Cardaci	1987	1992	DC
9	Vincenzo Vigiano	1992	1994	DC

=== Direct election (since 1994) ===
Since 1994, under provisions of new local administration law, the Mayor of Enna is chosen by direct election, originally every four, then every five years.

	Mayor	Term start	Term end	Party	Coalition	Election
10	Antonio Alvano	27 June 1994	8 June 1998	FI	FI • AN • CCD	1994
10	Antonio Alvano	8 June 1998	21 April 2000 (Note: Ousted from office by the City Council with a motion of no confidence.)	FI	FI • AN • CCD	1998
Special Prefectural Commissioner tenure (21 April 2000 – 11 December 2000)
11	Rosario Ardica	11 December 2000	2 February 2005 (Note: Ousted from office by the City Council with a motion of no confidence.)	AN	FI • AN • CCD	2000
Special Prefectural Commissioner tenure (2 February 2005 – 17 May 2005)
12	Rino Agnello	17 May 2005	15 June 2010	DL; PD	DL • DS	2005
13	Paolo Garofalo	15 June 2010	17 June 2015	PD	PD	2010
14	Maurizio Dipietro	17 June 2015	6 October 2020	Ind; IV	Ind	2015
14	Maurizio Dipietro	6 October 2020 (Note: Election originally scheduled for June 2020 then postponed due to the COVID-19 pandemic.)	27 May 2026	Ind; IV	IV • Ind	2020
15	Vladimiro Crisafulli	27 May 2026 (Note: Election originally scheduled for October 2025 then postponed to May 2026. According to the Italian law, since 2011 local elections can take place each year only between 15 April and 15 June.)	Incumbent	PD	PD • AVS	2026
