= Gianni Usvardi =

Italian politician (1930–2008)

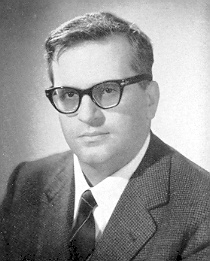
Gianni Usvardi

Gianni Usvardi (6 May 1930 – 21 May 2008) was an Italian politician who served as Deputy (1963–1972) and Mayor of Mantua (1973–1985).
