= Alessio Seoni =

Italian politician (born 1973)

President of the Province of Ogliastra
- Incumbent
- Assumed office 30 September 2025
- Preceded by: Office re-established

Mayor of Villagrande Strisaili
- Incumbent
- Assumed office 2 July 2019
- Preceded by: Giuseppe Loi

Personal details
- Born: 18 July 1973 (age 53) Lanusei, Sardinia, Italy
- Party: Sardinian Action Party
- Education: University of Sassari
- Occupation: Administrative officer

Alessio Seoni (born 18 July 1973) is an Italian politician who has served as president of the Province of Ogliastra since 2025 and as mayor of Villagrande Strisaili since 2019.

== Life and career ==
Seoni was born in Lanusei, Sardinia, in 1973. He graduated from the industrial technical institute in Tortolì and earned a degree in law from the University of Sassari in 2003. After working as a lawyer in a law firm, he began his career in public administration with the Province of Ogliastra.

In 2009, he became an administrative officer of the provincial administration and subsequently served as deputy secretary general. Following the abolition of the province, in 2016 he joined the Province of Nuoro as an official responsible for the winding-up administration of the former province. He subsequently became head of the province's socio-cultural services and head of the Ogliastra Homogeneous Area.

A member of the Sardinian Action Party, he served as a municipal councillor and assessor in Villagrande Strisaili from 2009 to 2014. He was elected mayor in July 2019 and re-elected in 2024.

In September 2025, Seoni was elected president of the Province of Ogliastra following the re-establishment of the province. He was supported by a cross-party civic and institutional coalition and received 82,681 weighted votes (82%).
