= Eugenio Dugoni =

Italian politician (1907–1960)

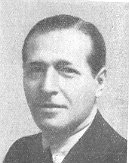
Eugenio Dugoni

Eugenio Dugoni (24 March 1907 – 24 August 1960) was an Italian politician who served as member of the Constituent Assembly (1946–1948), Deputy (1948–1958) and Mayor of Mantua (1956–1960).
