= Giovambattista Grimaldi =

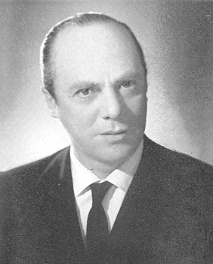

Member of the Chamber of Deputies
- In office 1963–1972

Mayor of Enna
- In office 1958–1959
- Succeeded by: Vittorio Ugo Colajanni

Personal details
- Born: 8 May 1923 Enna, Sicily, Italy
- Died: 14 February 1986 (aged 62) Italy
- Party: Italian Communist Party
- Education: University of Palermo

Giovambattista Grimaldi (8 May 1923 – 14 February 1986) was an Italian politician of the Italian Communist Party. He served as mayor of Enna from 1958 to 1959 and was a member of the Chamber of Deputies from 1963 to 1972.
