= Andrea Soddu =

Italian politician

Mayor of Nuoro
- In office 16 June 2015 – 11 June 2024
- Preceded by: Alessandro Bianchi
- Succeeded by: Emiliano Fenu

Personal details
- Born: 18 December 1974 (age 51) Nuoro, Sardinia, Italy
- Party: Independent
- Profession: lawyer

Andrea Soddu (born 18 December 1974) is an Italian politician.

He ran as an independent for Mayor of Nuoro at the 2015 Italian local elections, supported by a civic coalition and the Sardinian Action Party. He took office on 16 June 2015. In November 2020, Soddu is re-confirmed mayor of Nuoro for a second term.

== See also ==
- 2015 Italian local elections
- 2020 Italian local elections
- List of mayors of Nuoro

Political offices
Preceded by Alessandro Bianchi	Mayor of Nuoro; 2015–2024	Succeeded by Emiliano Fenu
