= Diego Ferrara =

Italian politician

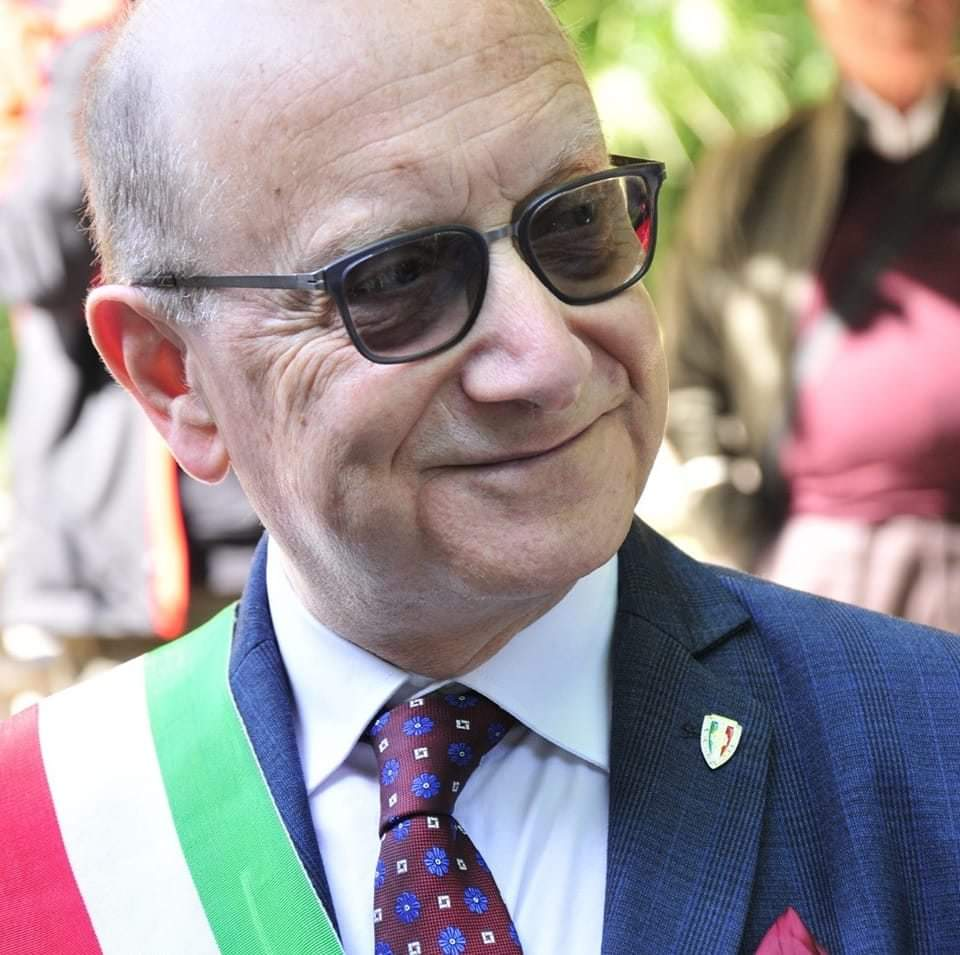

Mayor of Chieti
- In office 8 October 2020 – 10 June 2026
- Preceded by: Umberto Di Primio
- Succeeded by: Giovanni Legnini

Personal details
- Born: 29 June 1954 (age 72) Chieti, Italy
- Party: Democratic Party
- Education: D'Annunzio University of Chieti–Pescara
- Profession: Physician

Pietro Diego Ferrara (born 29 June 1954) is an Italian politician.

He is a member of the Democratic Party and ran for mayor of Chieti at the 2020 Italian local elections, supported by a centre-left coalition. He was elected at the second round with 55.8% and took office on 8 October 2020.

== Biography ==
In the 2020 municipal elections, he ran for mayor of Chieti, backed by the Democratic Party (Italy), Sinistra Italiana, and two civic slates; in the first round, he finished second with 21.50% of the vote, trailing the center-right candidate, Fabrizio Di Stefano, by 17 points; however, in the runoff election, after formalizing an electoral alliance with the civic coalition led by Paolo De Cesare, he won with 55.8% of the vote. He officially took office on October 8, 2020.

In April 2026, he announced his intention not to seek reelection for a second term as mayor in that year’s municipal elections, opting instead to run for city council on the PD ticket in support of the center-left candidate Giovanni Legnini.

== See also ==
- 2020 Italian local elections
- List of mayors of Chieti

Political offices
| Preceded by Umberto Di Primio | Mayor of Chieti; 2020–2026 | Succeeded by Giovanni Legnini |
