= Mattia Palazzi =

Italian politician

Mayor of Mantua
- In office 15 June 2015 – 26 May 2026
- Preceded by: Nicola Sodano
- Succeeded by: Andrea Murari

Member of the Provincial Council of Mantua
- In office 10 September 2016 – 28 September 2024

Personal details
- Born: 31 January 1978 (age 48) Mantua, Lombardy, Italy
- Party: Democratic Party
- Profession: Employee

Mattia Palazzi (born 31 January 1978) is an Italian politician.

He is a member of the Democratic Party and was elected Mayor of Mantua at the 2015 Italian local elections. He took office on 15 June 2015.

Palazzi was re-confirmed for a second term at the 2020 Italian local elections.

== See also ==
- 2015 Italian local elections
- 2020 Italian local elections
- List of mayors of Mantua

Political offices
Preceded by Nicola Sodano	Mayor of Mantua; 2015–2026	Incumbent
