= List of presidents of the Province of Ogliastra =

President of the Province of Ogliastra
- Presidente della Provincia dell'Ogliastra
- Incumbent; Alessio Seoni since 30 September 2025
- Term length: 4 years
- Inaugural holder: Pier Luigi Carta
- Formation: 2005

The president of the Province of Ogliastra is the head of the provincial government in Ogliastra, Sardinia, Italy. The president oversees the administration of the province, coordinates the activities of the municipalities, and represents the province in regional and national matters.

Since September 2025, the office has been held by Alessio Seoni of the Sardinian Action Party.

== History ==
The Province of Ogliastra was established in 2001 as part of the reorganization of the provinces of Sardinia and became operational after the first provincial elections held in 2005. The president was elected directly by citizens every five years. The province was abolished in 2016 as part of the regional reorganization of Sardinian provinces.

In 2021, the Autonomous Region of Sardinia approved the re-establishment of the Province of Ogliastra, which became operational on 1 April 2025. The first election of the president and provincial council of the new province was held on 29 September 2025, resulting in the election of Alessio Seoni.

== List ==
No.	Portrait	Name	Term of office		Party
No.	Portrait	Name	Start	End	Party
1		Pier Luigi Carta	9 May 2005	31 May 2010	Democratic Party
2		Bruno Pilia	31 May 2010	1 July 2013	Democratic Party
–		Antonello Ghiani (Special Commissioner)	1 July 2013	31 December 2014	—
–		Maria Gabriella Mulas (Special Commissioner)	31 December 2014	20 April 2016	—
Office abolished (2016–2024)
–		Marzia Mameli (Extraordinary Administrator)	27 September 2024	30 September 2025	—
3		Alessio Seoni	30 September 2025	Incumbent	Sardinian Action Party

== Sources ==
- "Storia amministrativa dell'ente". Ministero dell'Interno.
