= Gonario Gianoglio =

Italian politician (1932–2021)

Mayor of Nuoro
- In office 1964–1969
- Preceded by: Fausto Moncelsi
- Succeeded by: Peppino Corrias

Member of the Regional Council of Sardinia
- In office 1973–1979

Personal details
- Born: 1 January 1932 Orani, Italy
- Died: 13 October 2021 (aged 89) Cagliari, Italy
- Party: DC

Gonario Gianoglio (1 January 1932 – 13 October 2021) was an Italian politician. A member of the Christian Democracy party, he served as Mayor of Nuoro from 1964 to 1969 and in the Regional Council of Sardinia from 1973 to 1979.

== Biography ==
After earning a law degree from the Faculty of Law at the State University of Genoa, he held national positions with the ACLI. Elected mayor of Nuoro in 1964 at the age of 32, he held that office until 1969, when he was elected as a regional councilor for Sardinia for three terms, where he served on the Regional Executive Committee as councilor for Revitalization, Budget, and Urban Planning (1973), Budget, Planning, and Economic Revitalization (1973–1974), Industry and Commerce (1974–1977), and Planning, Budget, and Land Use (1978–1979).

Political offices
Preceded by Fausto Moncelsi	Mayor of Nuoro; 1964–1969	Succeeded by Peppino Corrias
