= Luigi Nicola Riserbato =

Italian politician

Mayor of Trani
- In office 26 May 2012 – 22 January 2015
- Preceded by: Giuseppe Tarantini
- Succeeded by: Amedeo Bottaro

Personal details
- Born: 18 September 1969 (age 57) Trani, Apulia, Italy
- Party: Apulia First of All
- Education: University of Bari
- Profession: lawyer

Luigi Nicola Riserbato (born 18 September 1969 in Matera) is an Italian politician.

== Biography ==
He graduated at the University of Bari and works as a lawyer in the city of Trani, Apulia.

He ran for Mayor of Trani at the 2012 Italian local elections, leading a centre-right coalition. He won and took office on 26 May 2012. He was suspended from office on 22 January 2015 after being charged for fraud, extortion and criminal association. The trial has begun on 27 June 2019.

== See also ==
- 2012 Italian local elections
- List of mayors of Trani

Political offices
Preceded by Giuseppe Tarantini	Mayor of Trani; 2012–2015	Succeeded by Amedeo Bottaro
