= 2010 Italian local elections =

The 2010 Italian local elections were held on different dates; most on 29–30 March (second round on 11–12 April) concurrently with the Regional elections.

In Trentino-Alto Adige/Südtirol the elections were held on 15–16 May with a second ballot on 30–31 May; all of 321 comuni of the region voted for a new mayor and a new City Council.

In Aosta Valley the elections were held on 23–24 May in the city of Aosta.

On May 30–31 the elections were held in Sicily and Sardinia.

In Italy, direct elections were held in municipalities and provinces: in each municipality (comune) were chosen mayor and members of the City Council, in each province were chosen president and members of the Provincial Council.

Citizens living in Italy who were 18 or over on election day were entitled to vote in the local council elections.

== Voting system ==
The voting system is used for all mayoral elections in Italy in cities with a population higher than 15,000. Under this system voters express a direct choice for the mayor or an indirect choice voting for the party of the candidate's coalition. If no candidate receives at least 50% of votes, the top two candidates go to a second round after two weeks. This gives a result whereby the winning candidate may be able to claim majority support, although it is not guaranteed.

The election of the City Council is based on a direct choice for the candidate with a preference vote: the candidate with the majority of the preferences is elected. The number of the seats for each party is determined proportionally.

== Municipal elections ==
=== Mayoral election results ===
Cities	Incumbent mayor	Alliance	Elected mayor	Alliance
Aosta	Guido Grimod	Valdostan Union	Bruno Giordano	Valdostan Union
Bolzano	Luigi Spagnolli	Centre-left	Luigi Spagnolli	Centre-left
Venice	Massimo Cacciari	Centre-left	Giorgio Orsoni	Centre-left
Mantua	Fiorenza Brioni	Centre-left	Nicola Sodano	Centre-right
Lecco	Sante Frantellizzi (Note: Special commissioner replacing mayor Antonella Faggi (LN) since 28 October 2009.)	None	Virginio Brivio	Centre-left
Lodi	Lorenzo Guerini	Centre-left	Lorenzo Guerini	Centre-left
Macerata	Giorgio Meschini	Centre-left	Romano Carancini	Centre-left
Chieti	Francesco Ricci	Centre-left	Umberto Di Primio	Centre-right
Matera	Sandro Calvosa (Note: Special commissioner replacing mayor Emilio Nicola Buccico (AN) since 5 October 2009.)	None	Salvatore Adduce	Centre-left
Andria	Vincenzo Zaccaro	Centre-left	Nicola Giorgino	Centre-right
Vibo Valentia	Francesco Sammarco	Centre-left	Nicola D'Agostino	Centre-right
Nuoro	Mauro Demuru Zidda	Centre-left	Alessandro Bianchi	Centre-left
Iglesias	Pierluigi Carta	Centre-left	Pierluigi Carta	Centre-left
Sassari	Gianfranco Ganau	Centre-left	Gianfranco Ganau	Centre-left
Enna	Gaspare Agnello	Centre-left	Paolo Garofalo	Centre-left

=== City councils ===
City	PdL	PD	LN	SEL	IdV	UDC	Others
Venice	10	17	4	0	4	2	7
Mantua	14	9	6	1	1	0	4
Lecco	8	20	7	1	1	0	1
Lodi	8	14	6	0	1	0	10
Chieti	13	7	0	0	2	6	11
Matera	4	12	0	1	4	1	17
Vibo Valentia	18	3	0	1	0	2	15
Macerata	8	14	0	4	2	2	7
Andria	13	4	0	2	1	0	17
Sassari	6	13	0	2	2	3	13
Iglesias	4	6	0	1	0	8	9
Nuoro	4	13	0	2	1	2	15

== Provincial elections ==
Only 12 provinces were up for election. The elections was for a new provincial president and members of the Provincial Council. Four presidents were elected in March. Then on May was elected all the provincial president and Provincial Council of Sardinia.

=== President election results ===
Provinces	Incumbent president	Alliance	Elected president	Alliance
Imperia	Giovanni Giuliano	Centre-right	Luigi Sappa	Centre-right
Viterbo	Alessandro Mazzoli	Centre-left	Marcello Meroi	Centre-right
L'Aquila	Stefania Pezzopane	Centre-left	Antonio Del Corvo	Centre-right
Caserta	Alessandro De Franciscis	Centre-left	Domenico Zinzi	Centre-right
Cagliari	Graziano Milia	Centre-left	Graziano Milia	Centre-left
Carbonia-Iglesias	Pierfranco Gaviano	Centre-left	Salvatore Cherchi	Centre-left
Medio Campidano	Fulvio Tocco	Centre-left	Fulvio Tocco	Centre-left
Nuoro	Roberto Deriu	Centre-left	Roberto Deriu	Centre-left
Ogliastra	Pier Luigi Carta	Centre-left	Bruno Pilia	Centre-left
Olbia-Tempio	Anna Pietrina Murrighile	Centre-left	Fedele Sanciu	Centre-right
Oristano	Pasquale Onida	Centre-right	Massimiliano De Seneen	Centre-right
Sassari	Alessandra Giudici	Centre-left	Alessandra Giudici	Centre-left

== See also ==
- 2010 Sardinian provincial elections
