= List of mayors of Trani =

Mayor of Trani
- Sindaco di Trani
- Incumbent; Marco Galiano (PD) since 12 June 2026
- Appointer: Popular election
- Term length: 5 years, renewable once
- Formation: 1860
- Website: Official website

The mayor of Trani is an elected politician who, along with the Trani City Council, is responsible for the strategic government of Trani in Apulia, Italy.

The current mayor is Marco Galiano (PD), who took office on 12 June 2026.

== Overview ==
According to the Italian Constitution, the mayor of Trani is member of the City Council.

The mayor is elected by the population of Trani, who also elects the members of the City Council, controlling the mayor's policy guidelines and is able to enforce his resignation by a motion of no confidence. The mayor is entitled to appoint and release the members of his government.

Since 1995 the mayor is elected directly by Trani's electorate: in all mayoral elections in Italy in cities with a population higher than 15,000 the voters express a direct choice for the mayor or an indirect choice voting for the party of the candidate's coalition. If no candidate receives at least 50% of votes, the top two candidates go to a second round after two weeks. The election of the City Council is based on a direct choice for the candidate with a preference vote: the candidate with the majority of the preferences is elected. The number of the seats for each party is determined proportionally.

== Italian Republic (since 1946) ==
=== City Council election (1946–1995) ===
From 1946 to 1995, the Mayor of Trani was elected by the City Council.

	Mayor	Term start	Term end	Party
1	Giacinto Francia	17 December 1946	16 May 1947	PSI
2	Guido Maffuccini	16 May 1947	23 May 1948	PSI
3	Cesare Bianchi	23 May 1948	12 April 1949	Ind
4	Pasquale Plantulli-Lambert	12 April 1949	15 June 1952	PSI
5	Francesco Paolo Moneglli	15 June 1952	21 December 1957	PSDI
6	Luciano Nunziante	21 December 1957	11 September 1961	DC
7	Saverio Grilli	11 September 1961	27 March 1964	DC
8	Nicola Baldassarre	27 March 1964	6 February 1965	DC
(7)	Saverio Grilli	6 February 1965	10 May 1966	DC
9	Antonio Talamo	10 May 1966	1 September 1970	DC
(7)	Saverio Grilli	1 September 1970	19 February 1973	DC
(8)	Nicola Baldassarre	19 February 1973	22 July 1975	DC
10	Sabino Loiodice	22 July 1975	10 August 1980	DC
11	Francesco De Palma	10 August 1980	7 May 1982	DC
(8)	Nicola Baldassarre	7 May 1982	23 August 1985	DC
12	Vincenzo Caruso	23 August 1985	12 November 1986	PSI
(8)	Nicola Baldassarre	12 November 1986	19 July 1990	DC
13	Giuseppe Di Marzio	19 July 1990	20 August 1993	DC
Special Commission's tenure (20 August 1993 – 12 May 1995) (Note: Special Commission nominated after the municipal administration had been dissolved by the Government due to Mafia association)

=== Direct election (since 1995) ===
Since 1995, under provisions of new local administration law, the Mayor of Trani is chosen by direct election, originally every four, then every five years.

	Mayor	Term start	Term end	Party	Coalition	Election
14	Giancarlo Tamborrino	12 May 1995	28 June 1999	AN	AN	1995
15	Carlo Avantario	28 June 1999	17 January 2003 (Note: Resigned.)	DS	DS • RI • Dem • PPI	1999
Special Prefectural Commissioner tenure (17 January 2003 – 27 May 2003)
16	Giuseppe Tarantini	27 May 2003	16 October 2006 (Note: Resigned after losing the majority in the City Council.)	AN	FI • AN • UDC • PRI	2003
Special Prefectural Commissioner tenure (16 October 2006 – 29 May 2007)
(16)	Giuseppe Tarantini	29 May 2007	26 May 2012	AN	FI • AN • UDC • PRI	2007
17	Luigi Nicola Riserbato	26 May 2012	22 January 2015 (Note: Resigned after being arrested for fraud, extortion and criminal association.)	PpT	PdL • PpT • AdC	2012
Special Prefectural Commissioner tenure (22 January 2015 – 19 June 2015)
18	Amedeo Bottaro	19 June 2015	23 September 2020	PD	PD • SEL • FdV • PRI	2015
18	Amedeo Bottaro	23 September 2020 (Note: Election originally scheduled for June 2020 then postponed due to the COVID-19 pandemic.)	12 June 2026	PD	PD • EV • SI	2020
19	Marco Galiano	12 June 2026 (Note: Election originally scheduled for September 2025 then postponed to May 2026. According to the Italian law, since 2011 local elections can take place each year only between 15 April and 15 June.)	Incumbent	PD	PD • AVS • IV	2026

== Bibliography ==
- "Elenco dei Sindaci di Trani dal 1860" (PDF).
