= Gianfranco Burchiellaro =

Italian politician (born 1960)

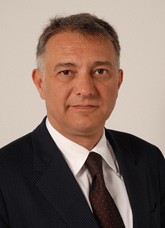

Mayor of Mantua
- In office 24 June 1996 – 19 April 2005
- Preceded by: Chiara Pinfari
- Succeeded by: Fiorenza Brioni

Member of the Chamber of Deputies
- In office 3 May 2006 – 28 April 2008

Personal details
- Born: 7 February 1960 (age 66) Mantua, Lombardy, Italy
- Party: Democratic Party of the Left (until 1998); Democrats of the Left (1998-2007); Democratic Party (since 2007)
- Profession: employee

Gianfranco Burchiellaro (born 7 February 1960) was an Italian politician who served as Mayor of Mantua (1996–2005) and Deputy (2006–2008).

Political offices
Preceded by Chiara Pinfari	Mayor of Mantua; 1996–2005	Succeeded by Fiorenza Brioni
