= Antonello Soro =

Italian politician (born 1948)

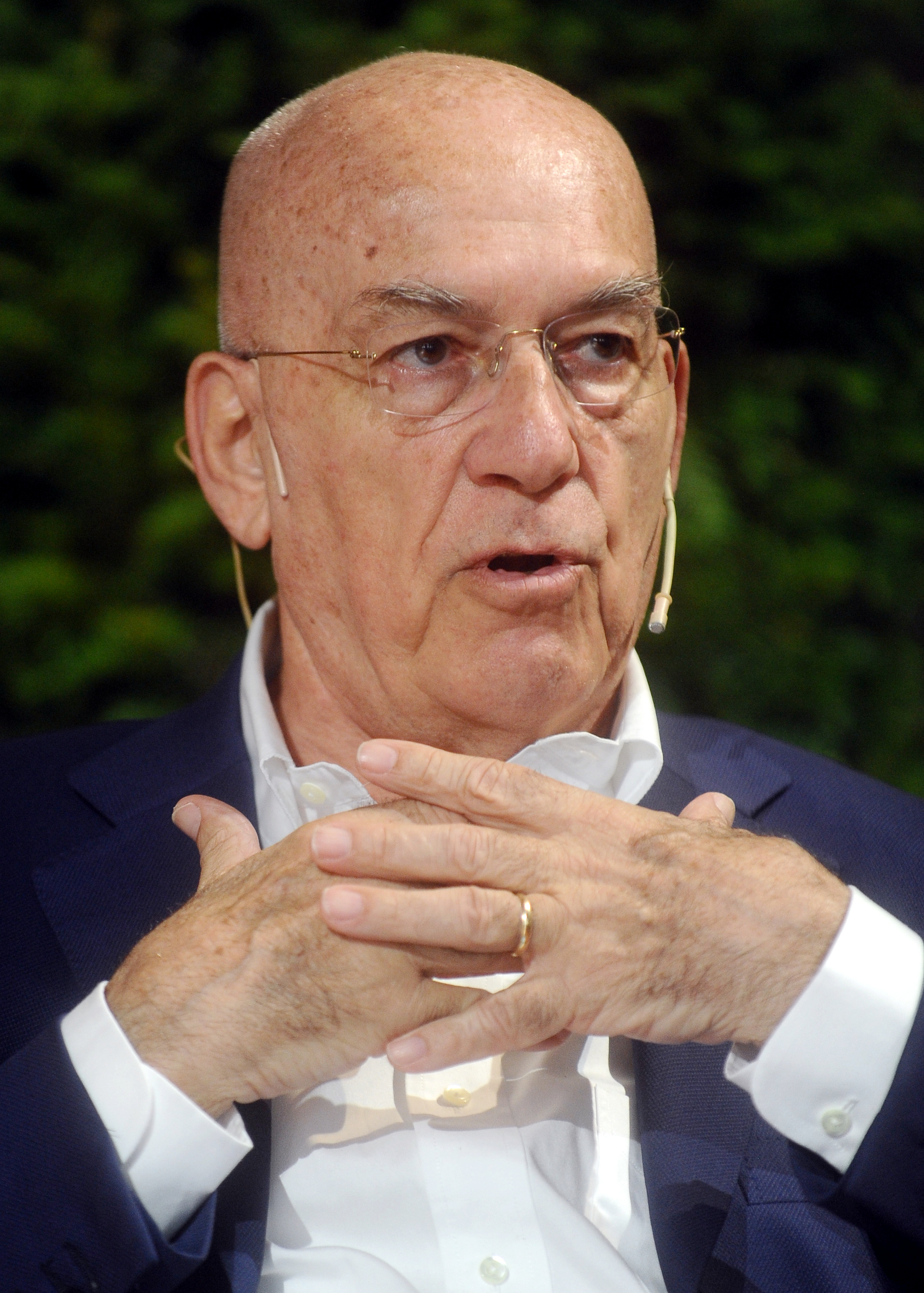

Mayor of Nuoro
- In office 18 January 1979 – 9 June 1980
- Preceded by: Franco Mariano Mulas
- Succeeded by: Annico Pau

Member of the Chamber of Deputies
- In office 15 April 1994 – 7 June 2012

Personal details
- Born: Antonio Giuseppe Soro; 26 November 1948 (age 77) Orgosolo, Italy
- Party: DC (till 1994); PPI (1994-2002); DL (2002-2007); PD (since 2007)
- Education: University of Cagliari
- Occupation: Politician, medic

Antonello Soro (born Antonio Giuseppe Soro, 26 November 1948) is an Italian politician from the Democratic Party.

== Biography ==
Soro graduated in Medicine and Surgery at the University of Cagliari and began his career as a primary doctor. In the early 1970s, Soro started his political experience in the Christian Democracy youth movement and is elected Mayor of Nuoro in 1979, holding the seat for 18 months.

Very close to Beniamino Andreatta, Soro took part in the birth of the Italian People's Party, with which he is elected to the Chamber of Deputies in 1994 and 1996. In 1997, Soro has been appointed the coordinator of the national secretariat of the PPI led by Franco Marini.

He later joined Francesco Rutelli's The Daisy and is re-confirmed to the Chamber of Deputies in 2001 and 2006.

In 2007, Soro is one of the 45 members of the National Constituent Committee for the Democratic Party and is appointed first group leader of the party at the Chamber of Deputies, a role that was reconfirmed in 2008.

In 2008 Soro and the group leader in the Senate Anna Finocchiaro, due to their role as group leaders, are appointed Ministers for Parliamentary Relations in the Shadow Cabinet led by Walter Veltroni.

He left the office of group leader in 2009, after the 2009 Democratic Party primaries and is replaced by Dario Franceschini, and resigned from the Parliament in 2012, when he was elected member and then president of the Guarantor for the protection of personal data.
