= Domenico Bennardi =

Italian politician

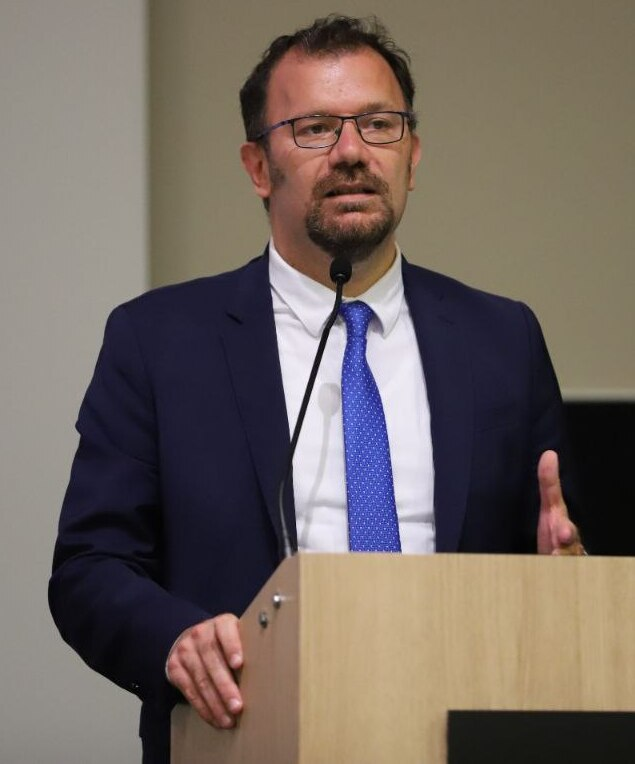

Mayor of Matera
- In office 6 October 2020 – 22 October 2024
- Preceded by: Raffaello De Ruggieri
- Succeeded by: Antonio Nicoletti

Personal details
- Born: 14 July 1975 (age 51) Fasano, Apulia, Italy
- Party: Five Star Movement
- Education: University of Florence
- Profession: Teacher

Domenico Bennardi (born 14 July 1975 in Fasano) is an Italian politician.

He ran for Mayor of Matera with the Five Star Movement at the 2020 local elections and was elected at the second round on 5 October. He took office on 6 October 2020.

== See also ==
- 2020 Italian local elections
- List of mayors of Matera

Political offices
Preceded by Raffaello De Ruggieri	Mayor of Matera; 2020-2024	Succeeded by Antonio Nicoletti
