= List of mayors of Mantua =

Mayor of Mantua
- Sindaco di Mantova
- Incumbent; Andrea Murari (PD) since 26 May 2026
- Appointer: Popular election
- Term length: 5 years, renewable once
- Formation: 1865
- Website: Official website

The mayor of Mantua is an elected politician who, along with the Mantua's city council, is accountable for the strategic government of Mantua in Lombardy, Italy.

The current mayor is Andrea Murari (PD), who took office on 26 May 2026.

== Overview ==
According to the Italian Constitution, the mayor of Mantua is member of the City Council.

The mayor is elected by the population of Mantua, who also elects the members of the City Council, controlling the mayor's policy guidelines and is able to enforce his resignation by a motion of no confidence. The mayor is entitled to appoint and release the members of his government.

Since 1995 the mayor is elected directly by Mantua's electorate: in all mayoral elections in Italy in cities with a population higher than 15,000 the voters express a direct choice for the mayor or an indirect choice voting for the party of the candidate's coalition. If no candidate receives at least 50% of votes, the top two candidates go to a second round after two weeks. The election of the City Council is based on a direct choice for the candidate with a preference vote: the candidate with the majority of the preferences is elected. The number of the seats for each party is determined proportionally.

== Republic of Italy (since 1946) ==
=== City Council election (1946-1995) ===
From 1946 to 1995, the Mayor of Mantua was elected by the City Council.

	Mayor	Term start	Term end	Party
1	Giuseppe Rea	1946	1955	PCI
2	Pietro Denicolai	1955	1956	PCI
3	Eugenio Dugoni	1956	1960	PSI
4	Luigi Grigato	1960	1973	PSI
5	Gianni Usvardi	1973	1985	PSI
6	Vladimiro Bertazzoni	1985	1990	PSI
7	Sergio Genovesi	1990	1993	PSI
8	Claudia Corradini	1993	1995	PRI

=== Direct election (since 1995) ===
Since 1995, under provisions of new local administration law, the Mayor of Mantua is chosen by direct election, originally every four then every five years.

	Mayor	Term start	Term end	Party	Coalition	Election
9	Chiara Pinfari	8 May 1995	15 September 1995	PPI	PDS • PPI • AD • FdV	1995
Special Prefectural Commissioner tenure (15 September 1995 – 24 June 1996) (Note: Nominated by the Prefect after the Mayor was declared ineligible and the election void.)
10	Gianfranco Burchiellaro	24 June 1996	30 April 2000	PDS; DS	PDS • PPI	1996
10	Gianfranco Burchiellaro	30 April 2000	19 April 2005	PDS; DS	DS • PdCI • FdV	2000
11	Fiorenza Brioni	19 April 2005	13 April 2010	DS; PD	DS • DL • PdCI • FdV	2005
12	Nicola Sodano	13 April 2010	15 June 2015	PdL	PdL • LN	2010
13	Mattia Palazzi	15 June 2015	23 September 2020	PD	PD • SEL	2015
13	Mattia Palazzi	23 September 2020 (Note: Election originally scheduled for June 2020 then postponed due to the coronavirus pandemic.)	26 May 2026	PD	PD • SI • IV • EV	2020
14	Andrea Murari	26 May 2026 (Note: Election originally scheduled for September 2025 then postponed to May 2026. According to the Italian law, since 2011 local elections can take place each year only between 15 April and 15 June.)	Incumbent	PD	PD • AVS • IV • A	2026

== Bibliography ==
- Morandi, Matteo (2010). Il consiglio comunale di Mantova. Materiali per una storia politica locale 1914-2010. Milano: FrancoAngeli.
- D'Arco, Carlo (1873). Studi intorno al municipio di Mantova dall'origine di questa fino all'anno 1863 ai quali fanno seguito documenti inediti o rari. Guastalla.
