= Nella Brambatti =

Italian politician (1949–2020)

Mayor of Fermo
- In office 20 May 2011 – 21 February 2015
- Preceded by: Saturnino Di Ruscio
- Succeeded by: Paolo Calcinaro

Personal details
- Born: 26 January 1949 Macerata, Italy
- Died: 12 November 2020 (aged 71) Fermo, Marche, Italy
- Party: PCI (until 1991); PDS (1991-1998); DS (1998-2007); PD (since 2007)
- Education: University of Macerata
- Profession: Teacher

Nella Brambatti (26 January 1949 – 12 November 2020) was an Italian politician who served as mayor of Fermo from 2011 to 2015. Former member of the Italian Communist Party, she joined the Democratic Party in 2007 and ran for mayor of Fermo at the 2011 Italian local elections. She was elected at the first round and took office on 20 May 2011. Brambatti resigned on 21 February 2015 after an internal government crisis.

== Life and career ==
After earning his classical high school diploma from the Liceo Ginnasio Annibal Caro in Fermo, he received a bachelor’s degree in Foreign Languages and Literature from the University of Macerata in 1975, with a specialization in French. That same year, he began working as a tenured French teacher at a middle school in the province of Ascoli Piceno, and from 2000 to 2006, he taught at a high school in Naples. From 2007 to 2013, he served as president of the Giovanni Battista Pergolesi Conservatory of Music in Fermo.

In 1990, she was elected to the Fermo City Council as a member of the Italian Communist Party, and following the “Bolognina” split, she joined the Democratic Party of the Left. She then served as the City of Fermo’s councilor for culture from July 1991 to March 1993 and again from June 1996 to June 1999.

In the 2011 local elections, she was elected mayor of Fermo with 51.04% of the vote in the first round, backed by six center-left lists (PD, SEL, Rifondazione-Comunisti Italiani, the Di Pietro list, and two civic lists). In January 2015, following internal conflicts within the local chapter of the Democratic Party—preceded by the departure of Left Ecology Freedom from the majority—she unexpectedly announced her early resignation, which she later withdrew but was followed by the mass resignation of 20 council members, automatically resulting in the mayor’s removal from office.

In January 2017, she suffered a serious injury after being run over by her own car, which had been parked without the parking brake engaged. She died in the fall of 2020 at the age of 71.

== See also ==
- 2011 Italian local elections
- List of mayors of Fermo

Political offices
| Preceded by Saturnino Di Ruscio | Mayor of Fermo; 2011–2015 | Succeeded by Paolo Calcinaro |
