= George Floyd protests in Italy =

2020 protests in Italy caused by the murder of George Floyd

- Part of George Floyd protests
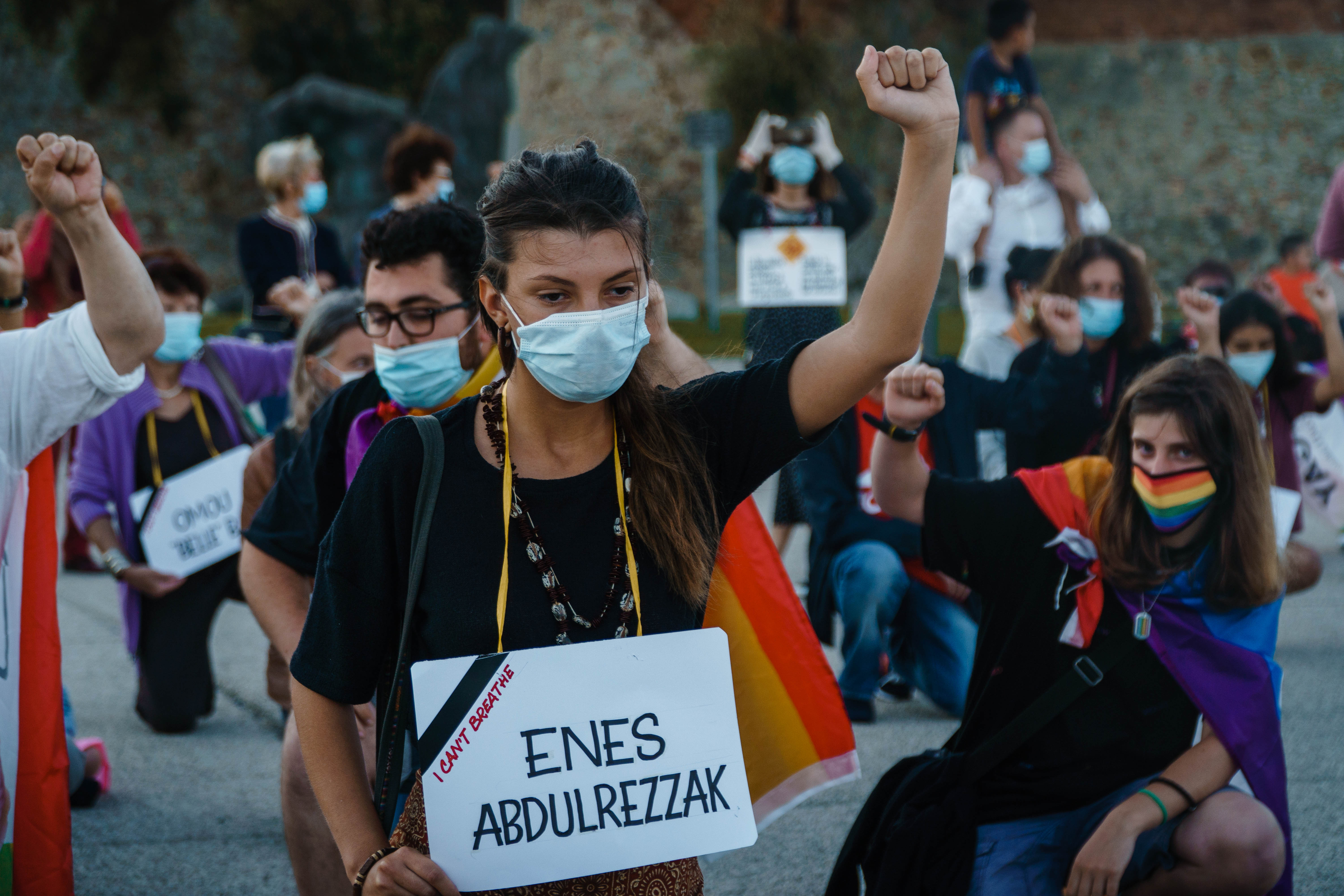
- George Floyd protests in Sanremo
- Date: May 28, 2020 - June 8, 2020 (1 week and 3 days)
- Location: Italy
- Caused by: Police brutality; Racism against minorities in Italy; Hate speech in Italian politics; Reaction to the murder of George Floyd

Shortly after protests seeking justice for George Floyd, an African American who was murdered during a police arrest, began in the United States, people in Italy formed their own demonstrations to show solidarity with the American protesters..

To protest, people knelt in piazzas all over Italy for 8 minutes and 46 seconds, spaced to respect the rules from COVID-19.

== Locations ==
=== Ancona ===
Around 200 people peacefully protested in Piazza Roma, Ancona, on 6 June. Organized by “Altra Idea di Città” and the “Spazio Comune Heval” social center, it saw many young people arrive, including many of African origin.

=== Bari ===
Over 300 students peacefully protested in Piazza Umberto I, Bari on 6 June, with the slogans "Racism is also a pandemic".

=== Bergamo ===
Thousands of people peacefully protested in Piazza Matteotti, Bergamo on 7 June.

=== Bologna ===
Around 1000 people peacefully sit-in in Piazza Maggiore, Bologna on 6 June to say no to racism in a flashmob "Say their name" organized by the Arci Ritmo Lento association.

=== Como ===
Around 200 people protested in front of the former Casa del Fascio in Piazza Verdi, Como, on 6 June, organized by Unione degli studenti and Como senza frontiere.

=== Florence ===
Around a thousand people peacefully protested outside the US Consulate in Florence on 6 June.

=== Genoa ===
At 10:00 AM on June 6, 2020, in via XX Settembre, Genoa people organized a flash mob under the monumental bridge with 5 minutes of silence.

=== Grosseto ===
Around 350 people peacefully protested with a flash mob in the urban park of Via Giotto, in the district of Gorarella, Grosseto, on 13 June.

=== L'Aquila ===
At 4:00 PM on June 6, 2020, hundreds of people protested in Piazza del Duomo in the city of L'Aquila.

=== Lecco ===
Around 200 people protested in Piazza Garibaldi, Lecco, on 6 June. More than 200 boys and girls knelt with their fists raised, observing a minute of silence in memory of George Floyd and the many victims of United States and Italian racism.

=== Livorno ===
Hundreds of people peacefully protested in Terrazza Mascagni, Livorno, on 12 June.

=== Matera ===
Around 100 people peacefully protested in Piazza San Francesco, Matera on 2 June. Many young students took to the streets to protest "against all injustices" shouting "Let us breathe".

=== Milan ===
People peacefully protested outside the US Consulate in Milan on 28 May; on 7 June, thousands of people protested in Piazza Duca d'Aosta, in front of the central railway station.

=== Modena ===
A few hundred people, ordinary citizens and associations, peacefully protested in Enzo Ferrari Park, Modena, on 6 June.

=== Naples ===
At 3:00 PM on June 6, 2020, hundreds of demonstrators gathered in garrison under the American Consulate, in Piazza della Repubblica, for the first Neapolitan demonstration of the Black Lives Matter movement. In the square next to the representatives of the migrant communities there are many students, university and non-university students, and the organizations born after the deaths of Ugo Russo, Willy Monteiro and Davide Bifolco, (except for Monteiro) also killed by the police, whose families are still seeking justice.

=== Palermo ===
On June 6, 2020, hundreds of protesters took up the invitation of some independent activists and gathered in front of the Politeama Theater in Palermo in memory of George Floyd. The protest opened with the participants on their knees and with their fists raised in obsequious silence and then space for the "open microphone" which saw activists (from associations and NGOs such as Amnesty International, ForumAntirazzista, Sea-Eye and Mediterranea) and young migrants showed solidarity with those engaged in the struggles in the US, and anger towards racism that is increasingly growing in Italy too.

=== Perugia ===
On June 7, 2020, many private citizens and university associations, especially young people but also families, demonstrated in Piazza IV Novembre, in Perugia, Umbria against all racism.

=== Pescara ===
On June 13, 2020, people of the city of Pescara takes to the streets with the 'Black Lives Matter' to show solidarity with the US mobilizations against racism, born after the murder of George Floyd.

=== Reggio Emilia ===
Around 150 people protested in Piazza Prampolini on 3 June at 6:00 PM in the city of Reggio Emilia.

=== Rome ===
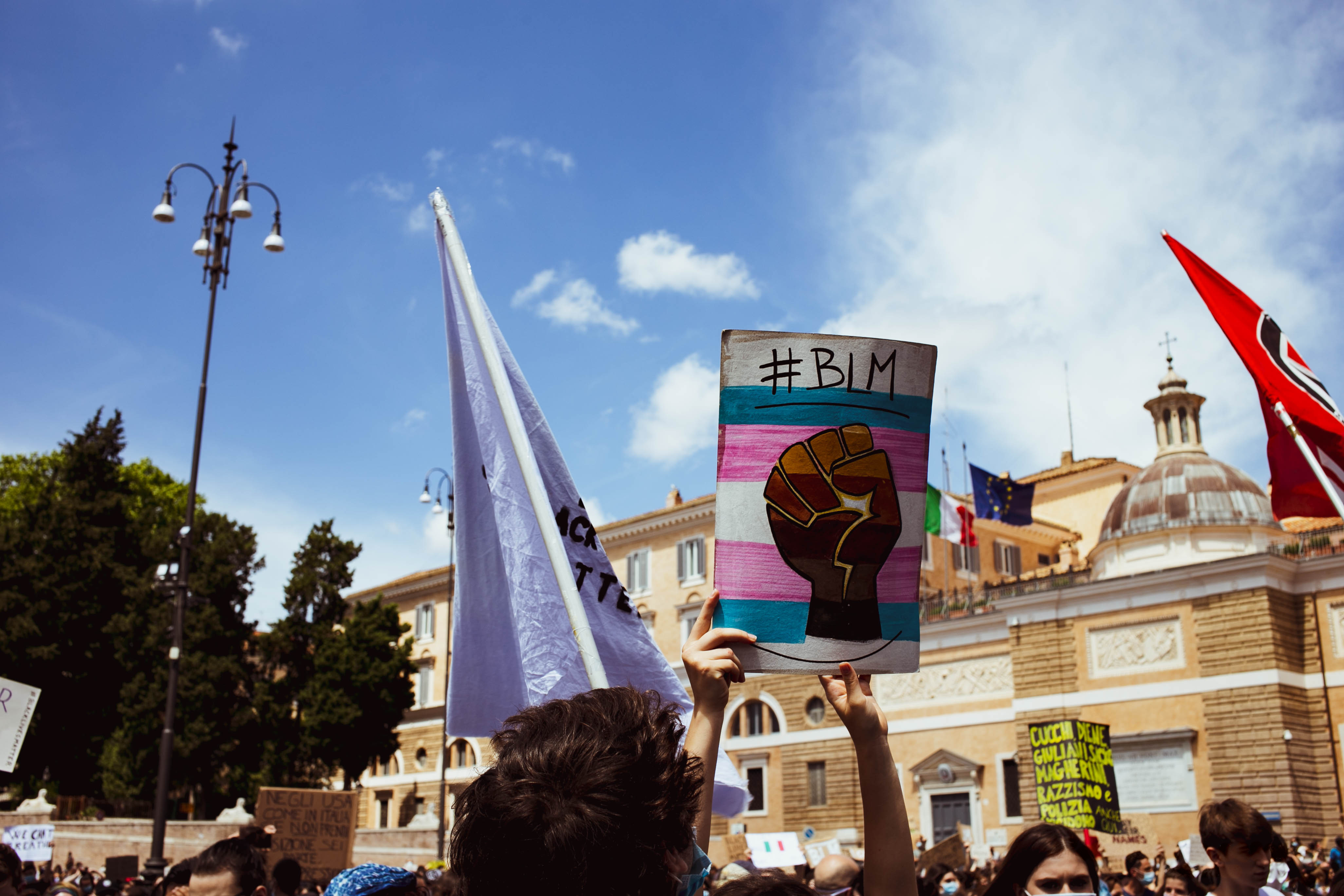
Protest in Rome on June 7, 2020

On June 7, 2020 Roman people screamed, simulating the last moments of the victim's life, "I can't breathe". Then they all got up: after the slogans "George is here, no to racism", another slogan: "We are all anti-fascists", followed by a long applause. More than 3000 people showed up to protest.

=== Rovigo ===
About 100 people peacefully protested in Piazza Matteotti on 13 June, after the finding of written racial slurls against George Floyd on a construction site.

=== Turin ===
About 200 people took to Piazza Castello in Turin on June 27, 2020, to demonstrate against racism in the wake of the 'Black Lives Matter' movement. Participants hold up placards with phrases such as "We are not in Africa", "You speak Italian well, you even have an accent".

=== Verona ===
Hundreds of students protested peacefully in Piazza dei Signori, Verona, on 5 June.

=== Viareggio ===
Around 300 people peacefully protested in Piazza Mazzini, Viareggio, on 6 June.
