= Alessandro Bianchi (politician, born 1965) =

Italian politician

Mayor of Nuoro
- In office 17 June 2010 – 16 June 2015
- Preceded by: Mario Demuru Zidda
- Succeeded by: Andrea Soddu

Personal details
- Born: 12 February 1965 (age 61) Oliena, Sardinia, Italy
- Party: Democrats of the Left (1998-2007); Democratic Party (since 2007)
- Spouse: Marcella Doa
- Education: University of Cagliari
- Profession: physician

Alessandro Bianchi (born 12 February 1965 in Oliena) is an Italian politician.

He graduated at the University of Cagliari and works as an oncologist in Nuoro. Bianchi is a member of the Democratic Party and served as Mayor of Nuoro from June 2010 to June 2015. He ran for a second term at the 2015 elections, but lost to independent candidate Andrea Soddu.

== See also ==
- 2010 Italian local elections
- List of mayors of Nuoro

Political offices
Preceded by Mario Demuru Zidda	Mayor of Nuoro; 2010–2015	Succeeded by Andrea Soddu
