= Roccamontepiano =

- Comune
- Comune di Roccamontepiano
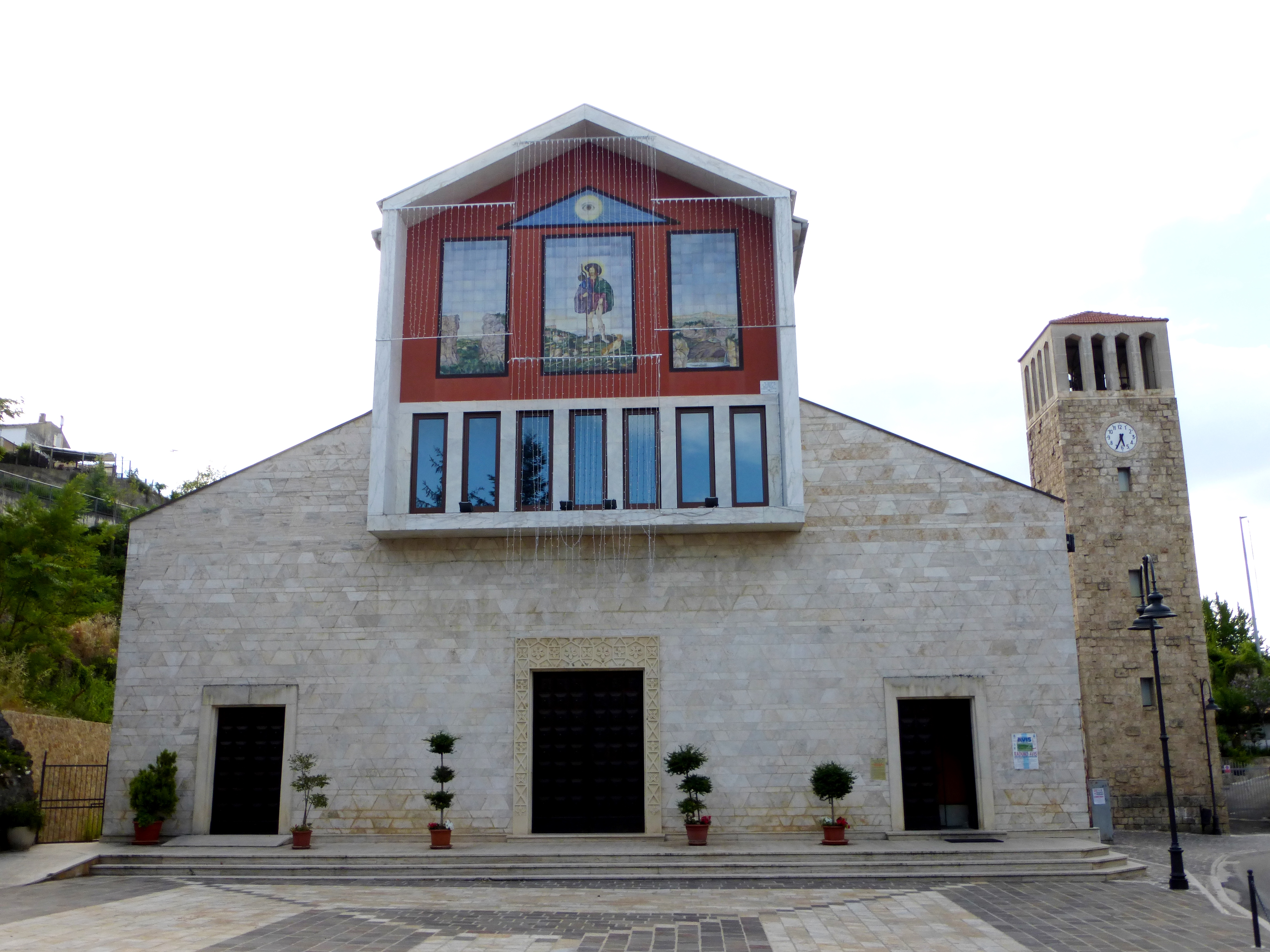
- Church of San Rocco

- Location within Italy Location within Abruzzo
- Coordinates: 42°15′N 14°8′E
- Country: Italy
- Region: Abruzzo
- Province: Chieti (CH)
- Frazioni: Baroni, Cappuccini, Cinquina, Corsi, Fanatici, Francione, Giancamillo, Giancoli, Legnini, Liberati, Manicottelli, Moreto, Pilati, Pioppi, Pomaro, Reginaldo, San Rocco (sede comunale), Terranova, Tracanna

Government
  - Mayor: Dario Marinelli

Area
  - Total: 18.22 km^{2} (7.03 sq mi)
- Elevation: 500 m (1,600 ft)

Population (31 December 2021)
  - Total: 1,558
  - Density: 85.51/km^{2} (221.5/sq mi)
- Demonym: Roccolani
- Time zone: UTC+1 (CET)
  - Summer (DST): UTC+2 (CEST)
- Postal code: 66010
- Dialing code: 0871
- Patron saint: St. Roch
- Saint day: 16 August
- Website: Official website

Roccamontepiano (Abruzzese: La Ròcchë) is a comune and town in the province of Chieti in the Abruzzo region of southern Italy.

== Geography ==
The comune of Roccamontepiano is located on the slopes of Montepiano and is about 450 meters above sea level. It spans 18 kilometres and includes partly mountainous terrain. Considered a comune sparso (comune of small hamlets), it is divided into several smaller settlements including San Rocco, Terranova, Reginaldo, Pomaro, and Sant'Angelo. The Alento river flows through the comune, along with the tributary Focaro; there are also two lakes, San Roeco and Cimmo.

== History ==
Roccamontepiano originally was built around a Lombard fortress that was made to defend the eastern side of Maiella. Starting in the 10th or 11th century, the village was occupied by Benedictine monks who came from the Abbey of San Liberatore a Maiella. The earliest mention of the village came from geographer Muhammad al-Idrisi in maps he compiled in the 12th century, naming it as Ruqqua N Lan. Later mentions of it in the 14th century call it Rocca Montis Plani or Rocca De Monte Plano. At the time, it was divided into fiefdoms of Pomaro, San Pietro, Sant'Angelo and Polegra, and it was owned by the Monastery of San Liberatore a Majella. During the 15th century, the village was a fiefdom ruled by the Orsini family; later it was a fiefdom of Bartolomeo d'Alviano, and after the 18th century it was ruled by the Colonna family of Rome.

The original village, containing many scattered farms across the Montepiano slopes, was almost entirely destroyed by a landslide that occurred on 24 June 1765, following several days of heavy rain. The original rocca (fortification) of the village was destroyed, while the Monastery of San Pietro and three small churches survived. It was estimated that over 500 were killed by the disaster. Afterwards, Roccamontepiano was rebuilt lower down the hills.

The rebuilt town had a population of 2,425 by the 1861 census, which had risen to 2,766 by 1901. The population peaked at 3,017 in 1951 before declining to 2,618 by 1971 and further to 1,981 by 1981. As of the 2021 census, the population was 1,572.

Each year, on 16 August, Roccamontepiano holds a festival to Saint Roch, who, according to legend, visited the village from 1368 to 1370. During the festival, some people drink water from a spring at Saint Rocco's Sanctuary, considered the location of a miracle the saint performed. A procession occurs where women in traditional dress carry conche (water-carrying vessels) filled with flowers on their heads, later followed by a feast that concludes the celebration.

== Notable people ==
- Giovanni Legnini, politician and former mayor
