= List of mayors of Nuoro =

Mayor of Nuoro
- Sindaco di Nuoro

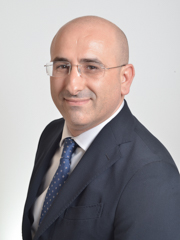
- Incumbent; Emiliano Fenu (M5S) since 12 June 2025
- Appointer: Popular election
- Term length: 5 years, renewable once
- Website: Official website

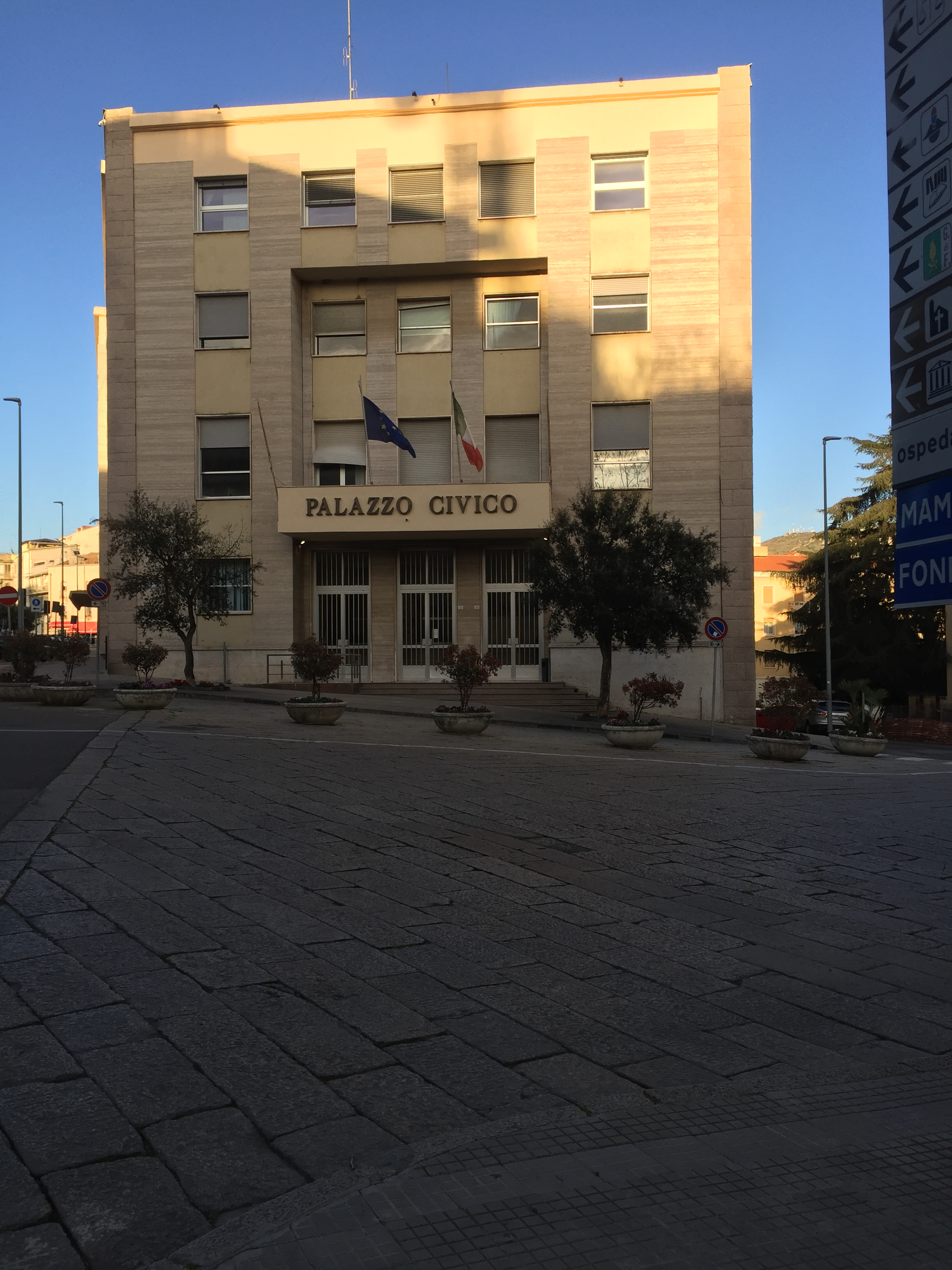
Nuoro's Town Hall.

The Mayor of Nuoro is an elected politician who, along with the Nuoro's city council, is accountable for the strategic government of Nuoro in Sardinia, Italy.

== Overview ==
According to the Italian Constitution, the mayor of Nuoro is member of the city council.

The mayor is elected by the population of Nuoro, who also elects the members of the city council, controlling the mayor's policy guidelines and is able to enforce his resignation by a motion of no confidence. The mayor is entitled to appoint and release the members of his government.

Since 1995 the mayor is elected directly by Nuoro's electorate: in all mayoral elections in Italy in cities with a population higher than 15,000 the voters express a direct choice for the mayor or an indirect choice voting for the party of the candidate's coalition.

If no candidate receives at least 50% of votes, the top two candidates go to a second round after two weeks. The election of the City Council is based on a direct choice for the candidate with a preference vote: the candidate with the majority of the preferences is elected. The number of the seats for each party is determined proportionally.

== Italian Republic (since 1946) ==
=== City Council election (1946-1995) ===
From 1946 to 1995, the Mayor of Nuoro was elected by the City Council.

	Mayor	Term start	Term end	Party
1	Antonio Monni	1946	1948	DC
2	Gino Satta	1948	1950	PSd'AZ
3	Alfredo Atzeni	1950	1956	DC
4	Piero Mastino	1956	1960	PSd'AZ
5	Angelo Rocca	1960	1962	DC
6	Fausto Moncelsi	1962	1964	DC
7	Gonario Gianoglio	1964	1969	DC
8	Peppino Corrias	1969	1975	DC
9	Franco Mariano Mulas	1975	1979	DC
10	Antonello Soro	1979	1980	DC
11	Annico Pau	1980	1983	PRI
12	Martino Corda	1983	1985	PSI
13	Giannetto Congeddu	1985	1987	DC
14	Gian Paolo Falchi	1987	1989	DC
15	Antonio Zurru	1989	1991	PCI
16	Simonetta Murru	1991	1992	PSI
(14)	Gian Paolo Falchi	1992	1993	DC
17	Francesco Zuddas	1993	1995	PLI

=== Direct election (since 1995) ===
Since 1995, under provisions of new local administration law, the Mayor of Nuoro is chosen by direct election every five years.

	Mayor	Term start	Term end	Party	Coalition	Election
18	Carlo Forteleoni	8 May 1995	13 July 1999 (Note: Reisgned.)	PPI	PDS • PPI • PdD	1995
Special Prefectural Commissioner tenure (13 July 1999 – 1 May 2000)
19	Mario Demuru Zidda	1 May 2000	10 May 2005	DS; PD	DS • PPI • PdCI • FdV • PSd'AZ	2000
19	Mario Demuru Zidda	10 May 2005	17 June 2010	DS; PD	DS • DL • PdCI • FdV • PSd'AZ • PRC	2005
20	Alessandro Bianchi	17 June 2010	16 June 2015	PD	PD • PSI • FdS	2010
21	Andrea Soddu	16 June 2015	11 November 2020	Ind	Ind • PSd'AZ	2015
21	Andrea Soddu	11 November 2020 (Note: Election originally scheduled for June 2020 then postponed due to the Coronavirus pandemic.)	11 June 2024 (Note: Resigned.)	Ind	Ind • IC	2020
Special Prefectural Commissioner tenure (11 June 2024 – 12 June 2025)
22	Emiliano Fenu	12 June 2025	Incumbent	M5S	PD • M5S • AVS • PP • PSI	2025
