= Emiliano Fenu =

Italian politician (born 1977)

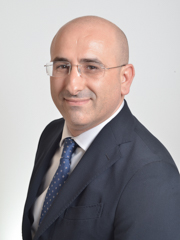

Mayor of Nuoro
- Incumbent
- Assumed office 12 June 2025
- Preceded by: Andrea Soddu

Member of the Chamber of Deputies
- In office 13 October 2022 – 22 July 2025
- Succeeded by: Mario Perantoni
- Constituency: Sardinia

Member of the Senate
- In office 23 March 2018 – 13 October 2022
- Constituency: Nuoro

Personal details
- Born: 29 January 1977 (age 49) Siniscola, Italy
- Party: Five Star Movement
- Education: University of Cagliari
- Occupation: Tax advisor

Emiliano Fenu (born 29 January 1977) is an Italian politician, mayor of Nuoro since 2025.

He has been a member of the Chamber of Deputies of the XIX legislature of Italy, after being a Senator of the XVIII legislature for the Five Star Movement.

== Biography ==
In 2003, he earned a degree in economics and business from the University of Cagliari. After working as an administrative clerk at a company, he has been a certified public accountant since 2007 and has been registered as a statutory auditor since 2008. Over the years, he has handled audits of local government entities, tax assessments, tax litigation, mediation, corporate accounting, tax returns, tax and fiscal assistance for businesses and individuals, corporate and contractual consulting, business valuations, and statutory audits.

Political offices
Preceded by Andrea Soddu	Mayor of Nuoro since 2025	Incumbent
