= Paolo Garofalo =

Italian politician

Mayor of Enna
- In office 15 June 2010 – 17 June 2015
- Preceded by: Gaspare Agnello
- Succeeded by: Maurizio Dipietro

Personal details
- Born: 9 December 1963 (age 62) Enna, Sicily, Italy
- Party: Democratic Party

Paolo Garofalo (born 9 December 1963) is an Italian politician.

Former member of the Italian Socialist Party, he joined the Democratic Party in 2007 and ran for Mayor of Enna at the 2010 Italian local elections. He won and served as mayor from June 2010 to June 2015.

== See also ==
- 2010 Italian local elections
- List of mayors of Enna

Political offices
Preceded by Gaspare Agnello	Mayor of Enna; 2010–2015	Succeeded by Maurizio Dipietro
