= Salvatore Adduce =

Italian politician

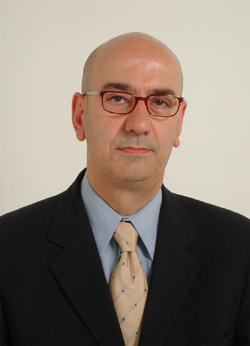

Member of the Regional Council of Basilicata
- In office 8 June 1995 – 17 April 2000

Member of the Chamber of Deputies
- In office 30 May 2001 – 27 April 2006

Member of the Italian Senate
- In office 28 April 2006 – 28 April 2008

Mayor of Matera
- In office 13 April 2010 – 15 June 2015
- Preceded by: Emilio Nicola Buccico
- Succeeded by: Raffaello De Ruggieri

Personal details
- Born: 14 February 1955 (age 71) Ferrandina, Basilicata, Italy
- Party: Italian Communist Party (until 1991); Democratic Party of the Left (1991–1998); Democrats of the Left (1998–2007); Democratic Party (since 2007)
- Profession: administrator

Salvatore Adduce (born 14 February 1955) is an Italian politician.

He served as member of the Regional Council of Basilicata from 1995 to 2000.

In 2001 he was elected at the Chamber of Deputies for the 14th Legislature; and served at the Italian Senate from April 2006 to April 2008.

Adduce ran for the office of Mayor of Matera at the 2010 local elections, supported by a centre-left coalition. He won and took office on 13 April 2010. He ran for a second term in 2015, but lost to the centre-right candidate Raffaello De Ruggieri.

== See also ==
- 2001 Italian general election
- 2006 Italian general election
- 2010 Italian local elections
- List of mayors of Matera

Political offices
| Preceded by Emilio Nicola Buccico | Mayor of Matera; 2010–2015 | Succeeded by Raffaello De Ruggieri |
