= List of mayors of Fermo =

Mayor of Fermo
- Sindaco di Fermo
- Incumbent; Alberto Maria Scarfini since 29 May 2026
- Appointer: Popular election
- Term length: 5 years, renewable once
- Formation: 1860
- Website: comune.fermo.it

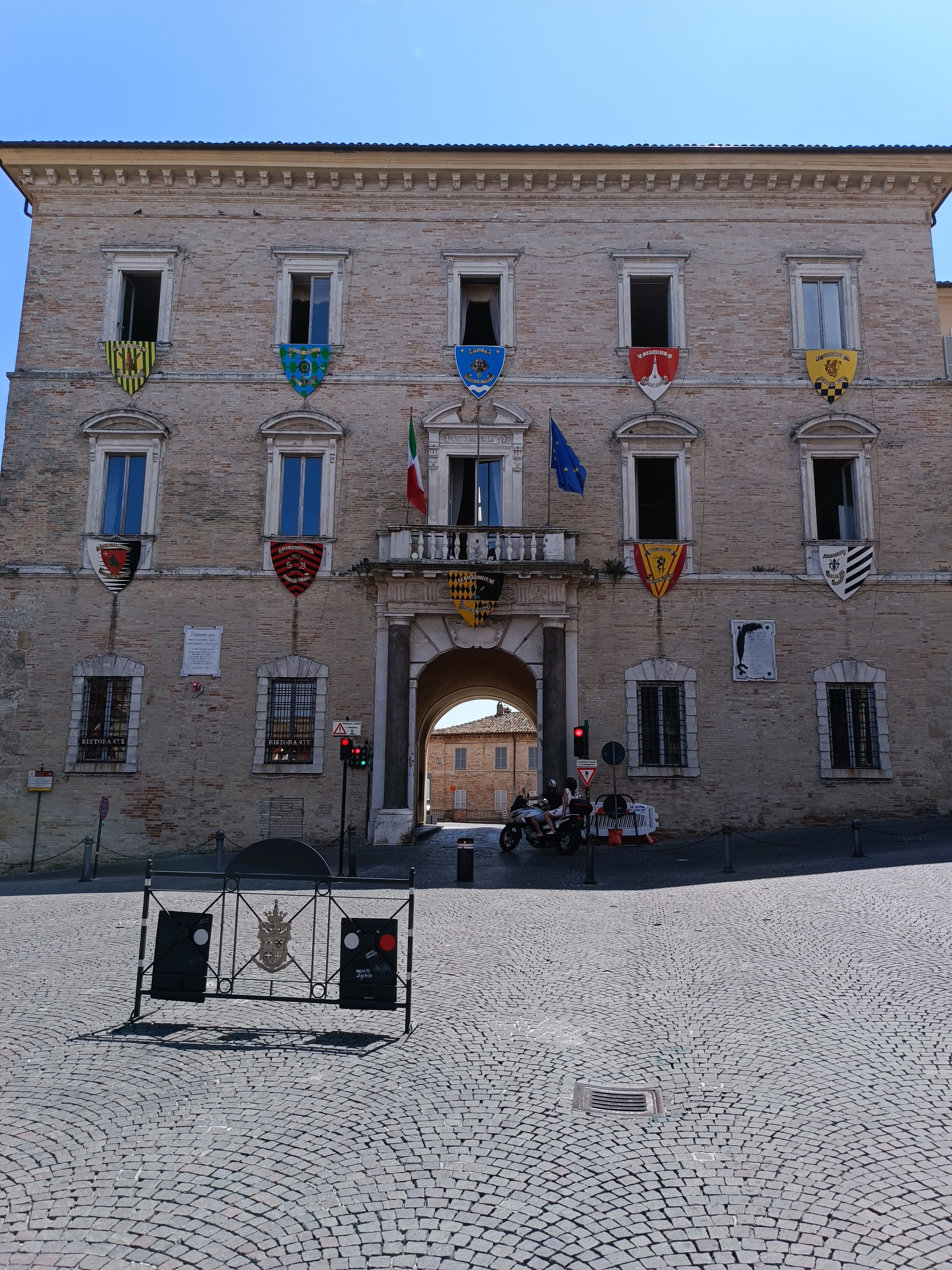
Fermo's Town Hall.

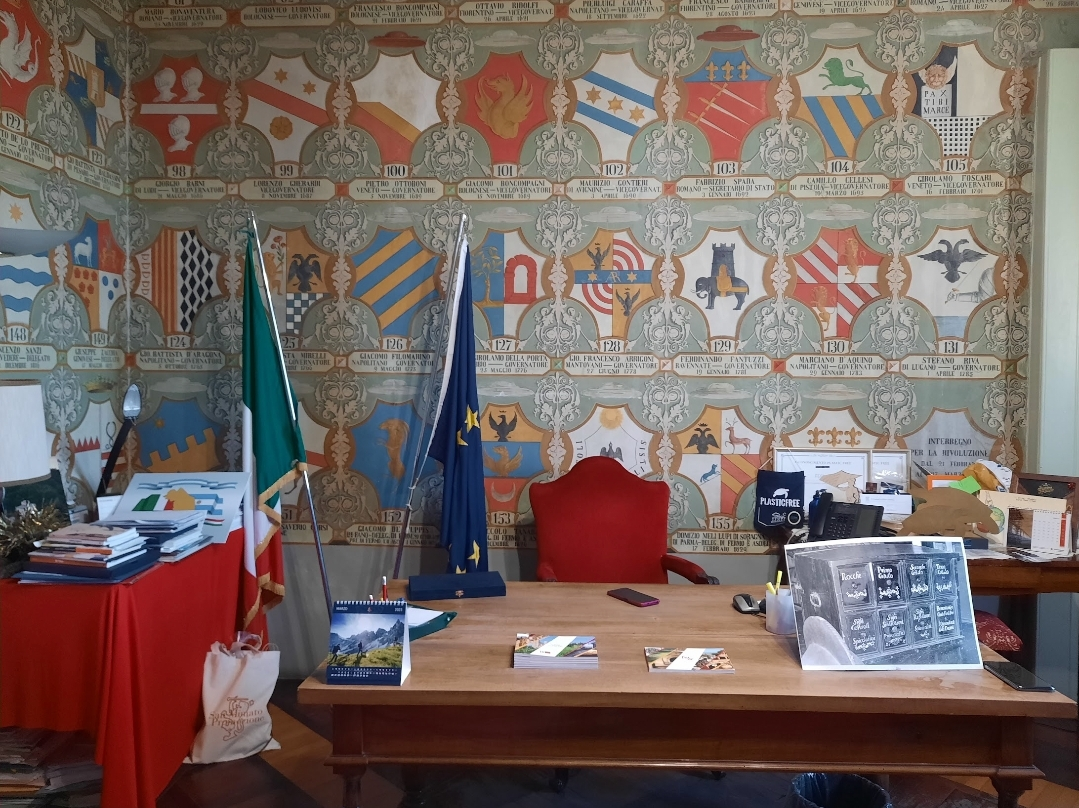
The mayor's office in the Town Hall.

The mayor of Fermo is an elected politician who, along with the Fermo City Council, is accountable for the strategic government of Fermo in Marche, Italy.

== Overview ==
According to the Italian Constitution, the mayor of Fermo is member of the City Council.

The mayor is elected by the population of Fermo, who also elects the members of the City Council, controlling the mayor's policy guidelines and is able to enforce his resignation by a motion of no confidence. The mayor is entitled to appoint and release the members of his government.

Since 1993 the mayor is elected directly by Fermo's electorate: in all mayoral elections in Italy in cities with a population higher than 15,000 the voters express a direct choice for the mayor or an indirect choice voting for the party of the candidate's coalition. If no candidate receives at least 50% of votes, the top two candidates go to a second round after two weeks. The election of the City Council is based on a direct choice for the candidate with a preference vote: the candidate with the majority of the preferences is elected. The number of the seats for each party is determined proportionally.

== Italian Republic (since 1946) ==
=== City Council election (1946-1993) ===
From 1946 to 1993, the Mayor of Fermo was elected by the City Council.

	Mayor	Term start	Term end	Party
1	Nicola Ciccolungo	1946	1952	DC
2	Mario Agnozzi	1952	1967	DC
3	Enrico Ermelli Cupelli	1967	1972	PRI
4	Annio Giostra	1972	1981	PSDI
5	Fabrizio Emiliani	1981	1986	PRI
6	Francesco De Minicis	1986	1989	PSI
7	Augusto Enzo Petrelli	1989	1990	PSDI
8	Pasqualino Macchini	1990	1991	DC
(5)	Fabrizio Emiliani	1991	1993	PRI

=== Direct election (since 1993) ===
Since 1993, under provisions of new local administration law, the mayor of Fermo is chosen by direct election, originally every four, then every five years.

	Mayor	Term start	Term end	Party	Coalition	Election
9	Ettore Fedeli	6 December 1993	17 November 1997	PDS	PDS	1993
9	Ettore Fedeli	17 November 1997	23 February 2001 (Note: Reisgned.)	PDS	PDS • PPI • RI	1997
Special Prefectural Commissioner's tenure (23 February 2001 – 28 May 2001)
10	Saturnino Di Ruscio	28 May 2001	30 May 2006	FI; PdL	FI • AN • UDC	2001
10	Saturnino Di Ruscio	30 May 2006	20 May 2011	FI; PdL	FI • AN • UDC	2006
11	Nella Brambatti	20 May 2011	21 February 2015 (Note: Resigned after losing the majority in the City Council.)	PD	PD • SEL • FdS	2011
Special Prefectural Commissioner's tenure (21 February 2015 – 17 June 2015)
12	Paolo Calcinaro	17 June 2015	23 September 2020	Ind	Ind	2015
12	Paolo Calcinaro	23 September 2020 (Note: Election originally scheduled for June 2020 then postponed due to the COVID-19 pandemic.)	18 December 2025 (Note: Resigned after being nominated Regional assessor of Healthcare and Social policies of Marche. The deputy mayor Mauro Torresi (Ind) is holding the office till a new municiapl election will be held.)	Ind	Ind	2020
13	Alberto Maria Scarfini	29 May 2026 (Note: Election originally scheduled for September 2025 then postponed to May 2026. According to the Italian law, since 2011 local elections can take place each year only between 15 April and 15 June.)	Incumbent	Ind	Ind	2026
