= Paolo Calcinaro =

Italian politician

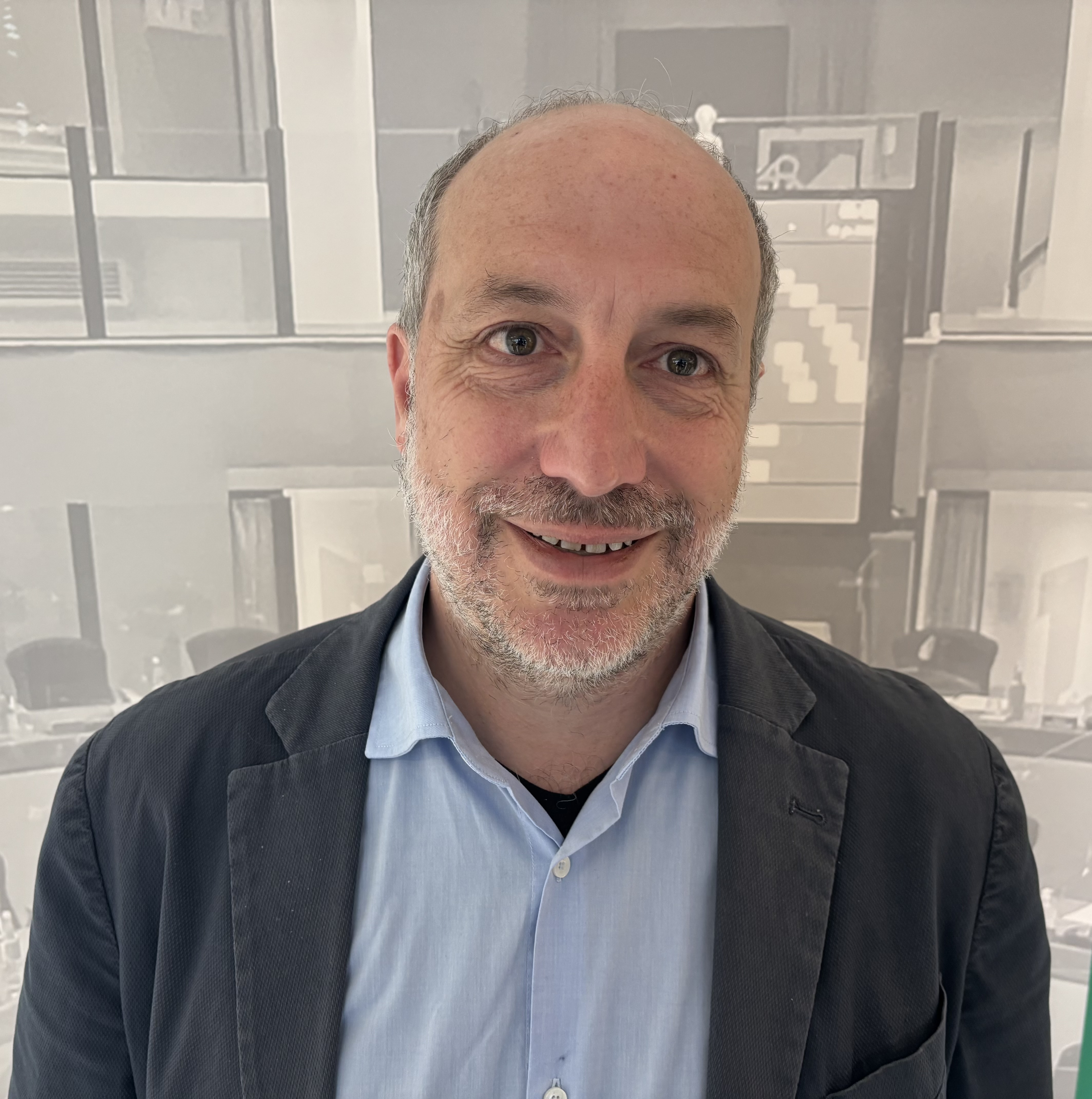

Regional assessor of Healthcare and Social policies of Marche
- Incumbent
- Assumed office 25 October 2025
- President: Francesco Acquaroli

Mayor of Fermo
- In office 17 June 2015 – 18 December 2025
- Preceded by: Nella Brambatti

Personal details
- Born: 13 September 1977 (age 48) Fermo, Marche, Italy
- Party: Centre-right independent
- Education: University of Bologna
- Profession: lawyer

Paolo Calcinaro (born 13 September 1977) is an Italian politician. An independent member of a centrist local Civic List, he was deputy mayor of the city of Fermo from 2011 to 2013. Calcinaro was elected Mayor of Fermo on 17 June 2015.

He was re-elected for a second term on 22 September 2020.

In the 2025 regional elections, Calcinaro ran for a seat on the Regional Council of Marche in support of the incumbent governor Francesco Acquaroli of Brothers of Italy, as a candidate on the civic list "I Marchigiani per Acquaroli". He emerged as the most voted candidate for the Regional Council across the entire region, receiving 9,311 votes.

Following the victory of the centre-right coalition and Acquaroli's reconfirmation as governor, Calcinaro was appointed regional assessor for Healthcare and Social policies.

== See also ==
- 2015 Italian local elections
- 2020 Italian local elections
- List of mayors of Fermo

Political offices
Preceded by Nella Brambatti	Mayor of Fermo; 2015–2025	Succeeded by
