= Maurizio Dipietro =

Italian politician

Mayor of Enna
- In office 17 June 2015 – 27 May 2026
- Preceded by: Paolo Garofalo
- Succeeded by: Vladimiro Crisafulli

Personal details
- Born: 22 April 1963 (age 63) Enna, Sicily, Italy
- Party: Democrats of the Left (1998-2007); Democratic Party (2007-2010); Independent (2010-2017); Democratic Party (2017-2019); Italia Viva (since 2019)
- Education: University of Catania
- Profession: Lawyer

Maurizio Dipietro (born 22 April 1963) is an Italian politician.

Former member of the Democrats of the Left, he joined the Democratic Party in 2007 but he left it three years later. He ran as an independent for Mayor of Enna at the 2015 Italian local elections supported by a centre-right coalition. He won and took office as mayor on 17 June 2015.

Dipietro joined again the Democratic Party in 2017 and left it in 2019 to join Matteo Renzi's new party Italia Viva.

== See also ==
- 2015 Italian local elections
- List of mayors of Enna

Political offices
Preceded by Paolo Garofalo	Mayor of Enna; 2015-2026	Succeeded by Vladimiro Crisafulli
