= Pier Luigi Carta =

Italian politician (born 1948)

President of the Province of Ogliastra
- In office 9 May 2005 – 14 June 2010
- Preceded by: Office established
- Succeeded by: Bruno Pilia

Mayor of Jerzu
- In office 1 June 1990 – 24 April 1995

Personal details
- Born: 21 June 1948 (age 78) Jerzu, Sardinia, Italy
- Party: Italian Socialist Party; The Daisy; Democratic Party
- Occupation: Teacher

Pier Luigi Carta (born 21 June 1948) is an Italian politician of the Democratic Party who served as the first president of the Province of Ogliastra from 2005 to 2010.

== Life and career ==
Carta was born in Jerzu, Sardinia, on in 1948. He worked as a secondary-school teacher before entering politics. A member of the Italian Socialist Party, he joined The Daisy and subsequently the Democratic Party. He was mayor of Jerzu from 1990 to 1995 and president of the Mountain Community of Ogliastra, and was involved in the movement for the territorial autonomy of Ogliastra and its separation from the Province of Nuoro.

In the 2005 provincial elections, Carta was elected the first president of the newly established Province of Ogliastra. He represented a centre-left coalition and received 59.94% of the vote, defeating centre-right candidate Attilio Murru. He served until 2010.
