= Raffaello De Ruggieri =

Italian politician

Mayor of Matera
- In office 15 June 2015 – 6 October 2020
- Preceded by: Salvatore Adduce
- Succeeded by: Domenico Bennardi

Personal details
- Born: 24 October 1935 (age 90) Matera, Kingdom of Italy
- Party: Centre-right independent
- Profession: lawyer

Raffaello De Ruggieri (born 24 October 1935) is an Italian politician.

De Ruggieri ran as an independent for the office of Mayor of Matera at the 2015 Italian local elections, supported by a centre-right coalition. He won and took office on 15 June 2015.

== Biography ==
Raffaello De Ruggieri, the younger brother of Michele and a former mayor of Matera, is one of the founders of the La Scaletta cultural club in Matera (a cultural institute recognized by ministerial decree). He is known for having championed the establishment of the Murgia Materana Park and for having introduced various bills related to the Sassi and their preservation.

He is also the founder and director of the Zetema Foundation, which, under his leadership, inaugurated the Museum of Contemporary Sculpture in Matera, promoted the restoration of the Crypt of the Original Sin (and other buildings in the city), and oversaw the opening of the School of Advanced Training and Study of the Central Institute of Restoration in Matera—the first of its kind in southern Italy. In addition, the foundation established the Casa di Ortega (a museum and workshop for the applied arts in the Sassi of Matera), which involved the restoration of the 15th-century Palazzo Gattini that houses it.

In 2007, he was appointed by then-Minister Francesco Rutelli as a member of the Higher Council for Cultural and Landscape Heritage;and in 2012, he was awarded the “golden robe” in the main hall of the Matera Court.

== See also ==
- 2015 Italian local elections
- List of mayors of Matera

Political offices
Preceded by Salvatore Adduce	Mayor of Matera; 2015–2020	Succeeded by Domenico Bennardi
