= Piazza del Duomo, L'Aquila =

Coordinates: 42.34887°N 13.39818°E

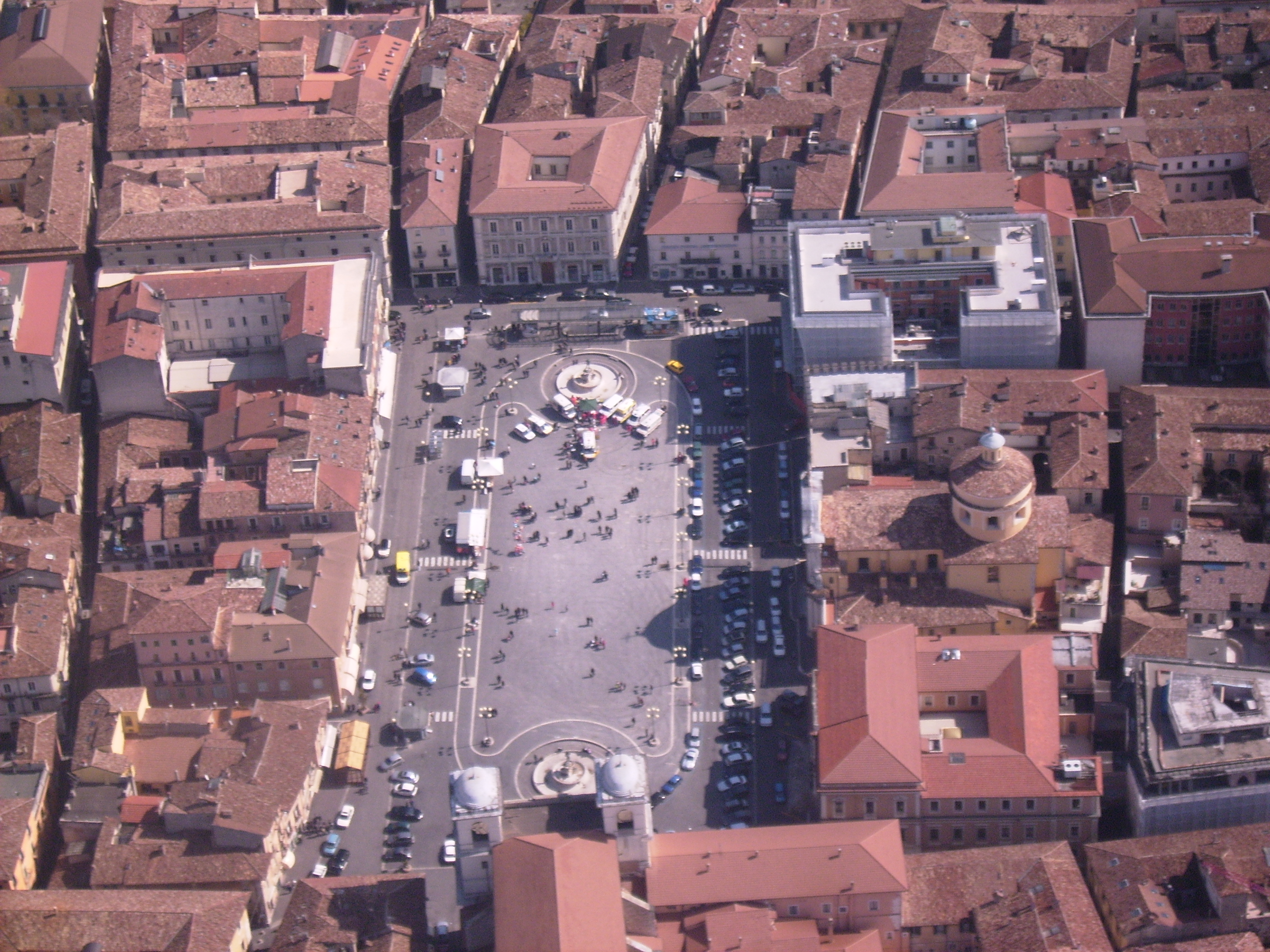
Piazza del Duomo

Piazza del Duomo is a city square in L'Aquila, Italy.

== Buildings around the square ==
- L'Aquila Cathedral
- Santa Maria del Suffragio, L'Aquila
