= Umberto Di Primio =

Italian politician

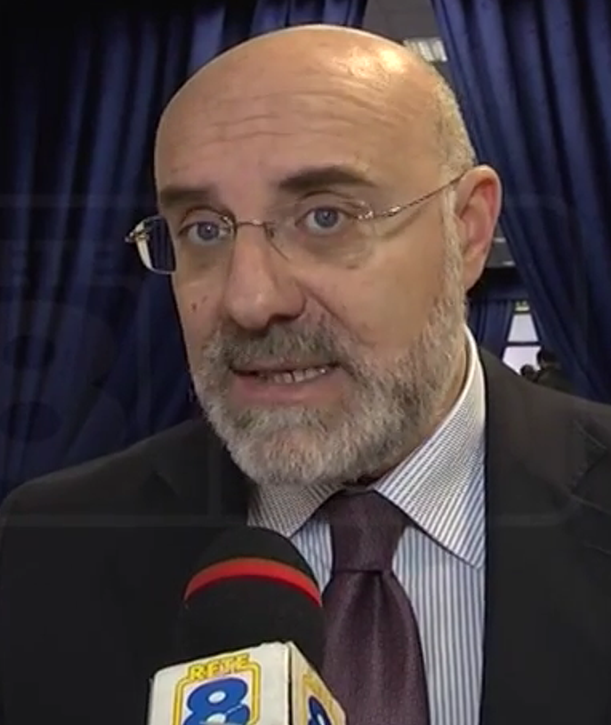

Mayor of Chieti
- In office 30 March 2010 – 8 October 2020
- Preceded by: Francesco Ricci
- Succeeded by: Diego Ferrara

Personal details
- Born: 1 December 1968 (age 57) Ripa Teatina, Province of Chieti, Italy
- Party: MSI (1987-1995); AN (1995-2009); PdL (2009-2013); NCD (2013-2017); Forza Italia (2017-2020); FdI (since 2020)
- Education: University of Teramo
- Profession: Lawyer

Umberto Di Primio (born 1 December 1968) is an Italian politician.

A former member of the far-right parties Italian Social Movement and National Alliance, he joined the centre-right party The People of Freedom in 2009 and then Forza Italia in 2013. He was elected Mayor of Chieti on 28 March 2010 and took office on 30 March. Di Primio was re-elected for a second term on 19 June 2015.

== See also ==
- 2010 Italian local elections
- 2015 Italian local elections
- List of mayors of Chieti

Political offices
Preceded by Francesco Ricci	Mayor of Chieti; 2010–2020	Succeeded by Diego Ferrara
