= Nicola Sodano =

Italian politician (born 1957)

Mayor of Mantua
- In office 13 April 2010 – 15 June 2015
- Preceded by: Fiorenza Brioni
- Succeeded by: Mattia Palazzi

Personal details
- Born: 3 July 1957 (age 68) Crotone, Calabria, Italy
- Party: Forza Italia (until 2009); The People of Freedom (2009-2013); Forza Italia (since 2013)
- Profession: architect

Nicola Sodano (born 3 July 1957) is an Italian politician.

He is a member of the centre-right party Forza Italia and was elected Mayor of Mantua at the 2010 Italian local elections. He took office on 13 April 2010 and served until 15 June 2015.

== See also ==
- 2010 Italian local elections
- List of mayors of Mantua

Political offices
Preceded by Fiorenza Brioni	Mayor of Mantua; 2010–2015	Succeeded by Mattia Palazzi
