= 2005 Sardinian provincial elections =

The 2005 provincial elections of Sardinia took place on 8–9 May 2005.

All the Provinces of Sardinia, including the newly established ones (Olbia-Tempio, Medio Campidano, Ogliastra and Carbonia-Iglesias), elected their Presidents and Provincial Councils. A run-off was needed in Olbia-Tempio and took place two weeks later. The elections saw a big victory for the centre-left, which won seven provinces out of eight.

== Results ==
=== Presidents ===
	House of Freedoms			The Union			Independence Republic of Sardinia			Others
	candidate	1st round	2nd round	candidate	1st round	2nd round	candidate	1st round	2nd round	1st round
Cagliari	Mariano Delogu (National Alliance)	51.8%	-	Graziano Milia (Democrats of the Left)	44.2%	-	Elisabetta Pitzurra (IRS)	0.8%	-	3.2%
Carbonia-Iglesias	Antonio Macciò (Union of Christian Democrats)	39.5%	-	Pierfranco Gaviano (Democracy is Freedom)	54.9%	-	Giovannino Sedda (IRS)	0.9%	-	4.7%
Medio Campidano	Francesco Atzori (Forza Italia)	24.4%	-	Fulvio Tocco (Democrats of the Left)	67.2%	-	Francesco Sedda (IRS)	1.4%	-	7.0%
Nuoro	Silvestro Ladu (Fortza Paris)	29.2%	-	Roberto Deriu (Democracy is Freedom)	60.4%	-	Pasqualina Soro (IRS)	1.4%	-	9.0%
Ogliastra	Attilio Murru (Forza Italia)	34.1%		Pier Luigi Carta (Democratic Socialists)	59.9%	-	-	-	-	6.0%
Olbia-Tempio	Livio Fideli (Forza Italia)	46.5%	48.6%	Anna Murrighile (Sardinia Project)	46.8%	51.9%	Giovanni Pala (IRS)	1.4%	-	5.3%
Oristano	Pasquale Onida (Fortza Paris)	52.4%	-	Silvano Cadoni (Sardinian Action Party)	45.0%	-	Francesco Sanna (IRS)	1.9%	-	0.7%
Sassari	Stefano Poddighe (Sardinian Reformers)	32.7%	-	Alessandra Giudici (Democracy is Freedom)	60.7%		Gavino Sale (IRS)	4.1%	-	2.5%

Source: Ministry of the Interior

=== Parties ===
Province	AN	FI	FP	UDS	RS	UDC	UDEUR	DL	PS	SDI	DS	PdCI	PRC	PSdAz	SN	IRS
Cagliari	8.0	11.2	3.8	-	9.1	9.0	3.5	9.6	3.5	3.9	14.7	2.8	5.8	4.7	0.9	0.8
Carbonia-Iglesias	4.2	8.6	1.0	4.3	6.2	17.3	3.0	9.3	3.5	6.5	18.0	2.6	6.3	4.2	0.4	0.9
Medio Campidano	7.8	6.0	-	-	3.8	4.6	5.9	11.6	5.3	4.3	23.3	3.3	6.1	4.4	-	1.4
Nuoro	5.4	4.5	8.0	-	3.4	7.0	-	14.1	7.4	9.5	17.7	4.6	6.5	7.1	2.0	1.4
Ogliastra	3.6	10.4	4.8	4.9	-	6.7	5.4	14.1	4.0	8.2	15.8	3.1	4.5	5.8	-	-
Olbia-Tempio	10.3	15.4	3.7	-	4.0	10.4	7.8	12.6	8.2	-	13.8	-	-	3.9	0.9	1.3
Oristano	8.4	7.6	11.4	7.4	7.1	10.0	-	11.4	4.2	4.6	12.3	-	4.7	7.2	0.6	1.8
Sassari	7.8	12.6	2.0	-	1.8	4.0	9.3	10.8	5.5	5.4	13.2	1.7	5.1	6.6	1.3	3.7

Source: Ministry of the Interior
