= Franco Masala =

Italian politician (1933–2006)

President of the Province of Sassari
- In office 1 May 2000 – 9 May 2005
- Preceded by: Pietro Soddu
- Succeeded by: Alessandra Giudici

Mayor of Sassari
- In office 28 January 1994 – 8 August 1994
- Preceded by: Franco Borghetto
- Succeeded by: Giacomo Spissu

Personal details
- Born: Francesco Masala; 8 September 1933 Bonorva, Province of Sassari, Kingdom of Italy
- Died: 22 March 2006 (aged 72) Sassari, Italy
- Party: Italian Social Democratic Party; Forza Italia
- Occupation: Manager

Francesco Masala (8 September 1933 – 22 March 2006), commonly known as Franco Masala, was an Italian politician who served as mayor of Sassari in 1994 and as president of the Province of Sassari from 2000 to 2005.

Masala was born in Bonorva, Sardinia, in 1933. He was initially a member of the Italian Social Democratic Party (PSDI) and later joined Forza Italia.

In the 2000 provincial election, Masala was elected president of the Province of Sassari as the centre-right candidate, defeating incumbent Pietro Soddu with 53.3% of the vote.

Masala died in Sassari on 22 March 2006, aged 72, after battling a serious illness for more than a year.
