= List of presidents of the Province of Sassari =

President of the Province of Sassari
- Presidente della Provincia di Sassari
- Inaugural holder: Antonio Martinez
- Formation: 1889
- Final holder: Alessandra Giudici
- Abolished: 2021
- Superseded by: Metropolitan mayor of Sassari

The president of the Province of Sassari was the head of the provincial administration of Sassari, a local government authority in Sardinia, Italy.

== History ==
The office of president of the Province of Sassari was established in 1889, initially within the Provincial Deputation. Before that date, the Deputation was headed by the prefect. During the Fascist period (1926–1944), the province was governed by appointed officials, including commissioners and presidents of the Rectorate. After World War II, the office was restored and gradually redefined within the Italian Republic, first with indirect election by the Provincial Council and, from 1995, with direct popular election.

The province was eventually replaced in 2021 by the Metropolitan City of Sassari. The final stages of the liquidation process concerning the remaining assets, administrative functions and procedures of the former Province of Sassari were completed in 2025, with the transfer of personnel, movable and immovable property, and related competences to the successor bodies.

== List ==
=== Presidents of the Provincial Deputation (1889–1926) ===
No.	Portrait	Name	Term of office		Party
No.	Portrait	Name	Start	End	Party
1		Antonio Martinez	1889	1892	?
2		Michele Abozzi	1892	1898	?
3		Antonio Vincentelli	1898	1903	?
4		Antonio Campus	1903	1906	?
5		Diego Murgia	1906	1910	?
6		Antonio Vincentelli	1910	1914	?
7		Diego Murgia	1914	?	?
		Michele Abozzi	14 August 1922	May 1923	National Democratic Union
		Giovanni Zirolia	May 1923	3 December 1923	Italian People's Party
—		Mauro Di Sanza (Prefectural Commissioner)	4 December 1923	31 January 1924	—

=== Presidents of the Royal Commission (1924–1929) ===
No.	Portrait	Name	Term of office		Party
No.	Portrait	Name	Start	End	Party
1		Attilio Fais	31 January 1924	16 February 1924	National Fascist Party
2		Mauro Di Sanza	16 February 1924	September 1925	National Fascist Party
3		Emiliano Pizzoni	September 1925	August 1926	National Fascist Party
4		Giovanni Fumu	August 1926	23 April 1929	National Fascist Party

=== Presidents of the Provincial Rectorate (1929–1944) ===
No.	Portrait	Name	Term of office		Party
No.	Portrait	Name	Start	End	Party
1		Lare Marghinotti	23 April 1929	1943	National Fascist Party

=== Presidents of the Provincial Deputation (1944–1952) ===
No.	Portrait	Name	Term of office		Party
No.	Portrait	Name	Start	End	Party
—		Eugenio Manunta Bruno	February 1944	27 June 1944	Prefectural commissioner
1		Eugenio Manunta Bruno	27 June 1944	1946	
2		Giovanni Berino	1946	1948	

=== Presidents of the Province (1952–2025) ===
No.	Portrait	Name	Term of office		Party
No.	Portrait	Name	Start	End	Party
1		Nino Campus	1952	1956	Christian Democracy
2		Antonio Porqueddu	1956	1961	Christian Democracy
3		Lorenzo Forteleoni	22 September 1961	1964	Christian Democracy
4		Salvatore Maniga	1964	1970	Christian Democracy
5		Gavino Bazzoni	1970	April 1974	Christian Democracy
6		Michele Corda	April 1974	1975	Christian Democracy
7		Giommaria Cherchi	1975	1980	Italian Communist Party
8		Giovanni Desini	1980	1985	Italian Democratic Socialist Party
9		Vittorio Franco Sanna	1985	1990	Christian Democracy
10		Giacomo Sanna	7 August 1990	12 June 1994	Sardinian Action Party
11		Antonio Pompedda	18 June 1994	24 April 1995	Democratic Party of the Left
12		Pietro Soddu	24 April 1995	30 April 2000	Italian People's Party
13		Franco Masala	30 April 2000	9 May 2005	Forza Italia
14		Alessandra Giudici	9 May 2005	1 June 2010	The Daisy; Democratic Party
14		Alessandra Giudici	1 June 2010	29 May 2015	The Daisy; Democratic Party
—		Guido Sechi (Special Administrator)	29 May 2015	3 August 2019	—
—		Pietro Fois (Special Administrator)	3 August 2019	19 September 2024	—
—		Gavino Salvatore Eugenio Arru (Special Administrator)	19 September 2024	1 April 2025	—

== See also ==
- List of mayors of Sassari
- Metropolitan City of Sassari

== Sources ==
- "Storia amministrativa dell'ente". Ministero dell'Interno.
- Brigaglia, Manlio; Castellaccio, Angelo Aldo; Contu, Ercole (1983). La Provincia di Sassari: i secoli e la storia (PDF). Sassari: Amministrazione Provinciale di Sassari. Archived from the original (PDF) on 31 January 2018.
- Menichini, Piera (2005). "I presidenti delle Province dall'Unità alla Grande guerra: repertorio analitico". Storia Amministrazione Costituzione (13): 287–288.
