= Nanni Campus =

Italian politician (born 1952)

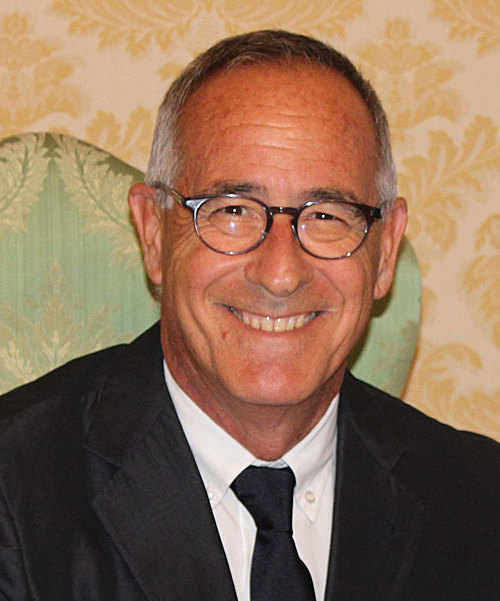

Mayor of Sassari
- In office 3 May 2000 – 9 May 2005
- Preceded by: Anna Sanna
- Succeeded by: Gianfranco Ganau
- In office 2 July 2019 – 17 June 2024
- Preceded by: Nicola Sanna
- Succeeded by: Giuseppe Mascia

Member of the Italian Senate
- In office 15 April 1994 – 15 June 2000

Personal details
- Born: Gianvittorio Gampus; 3 September 1952 (age 74) Sassari, Italy
- Party: MSI (till 1994); Forza Italia (1994-1996); AN (1996-2009); PdL (2009-2013)
- Education: University of Sassari
- Profession: Plastic surgeon, academic, politician

Nanni Campus (born Gianvittorio Campus, 3 September 1952) is an Italian academic and politician, Mayor of Sassari from 2000 to 2005 and from 2019 to 2024.

== Biography ==
After graduating in Medicine at the University of Sassari, Campus began his career teaching in his own alma mater. Meanwhile, he joined the Italian Social Movement and he later took part in the foundation of Silvio Berlusconi's Forza Italia, with which he is elected to the Italian Senate in 1994 and in 1996. During 1996, he left Berlusconi's party to join Gianfranco Fini's National Alliance.

He left his seat in the Senate in 2000, once he was elected Mayor of Sassari, supported by the whole Pole for Freedoms. In 2005, at the end of his term, Campus did not run again for mayor.

In June 2009, Campus was elected regional councilor of Sardinia for The People of Freedom (PdL), being the most voted candidate in the city of Sassari. In June 2012, together with other four regional councillors, he joined a new group in the Regional Council, named "Sardinia is already tomorrow" and chaired by Mario Diana. The new group included, in addition to Diana and Campus, Roberto Capelli (ApI), Claudia Lombardo (ex-PdL), and Massimo Mulas (UPC). Amid its formation, the group joined the opposition to the regional government led by Ugo Cappellacci (PdL).

In 2019, Campus ran again for the seat of Mayor of Sassari with the support of a coalition of centre-right civic lists: after ranking second in the first round, Campus won the run-off and was elected Mayor 14 years after his last experience.
