= Sardinian People's Party =

Sardinian People's Party Partito del Popolo Sardo
- Leader: Pasquale Onida
- Founded: 2000
- Dissolved: 2004
- Split from: Italian People's Party
- Merged into: Fortza Paris
- Ideology: Christian democracy
- Political position: Centre

The Sardinian People's Party (Partito del Popolo Sardo, PPS) was a political party in Sardinia.

The PPS was founded in 2000 by a split of Italian People's Party. In the Regional Council of Sardinia three councilors joined the party: Pietrino Fois, Silvestro Ladu and Pasquale Onida.

In 2004 the PPS joined the new party Fortza Paris.
