= Diego Murgia =

Italian engineer and politician (1857–1938)

Member of the Chamber of Deputies
- In office 1919–1924

Personal details
- Born: 12 October 1857 Sassari, Kingdom of Sardinia
- Died: 1938 (aged 80–81) Rome, Kingdom of Italy
- Occupation: Engineer

Diego Murgia (12 October 1857 – 1938) was an Italian engineer and politician who served as a member of the Chamber of Deputies of the Kingdom of Italy from 1919 to 1924. He was also active in local government in Sassari, serving twice as the president of the province.
