= Francesco Sanna (politician, born 1965) =

Italian politician (born 1965)

- Sanna in 2013

Member of the Chamber of Deputies
- In office 19 March 2013 – 22 March 2018

Member of the Senate of the Republic
- In office 6 May 2008 – 14 March 2013

Member of the Regional Council of Sardinia
- In office 14 June 2004 – 8 July 2008

Personal details
- Born: 14 April 1965 (age 61) Iglesias, Sardinia, Italy
- Party: Christian Democracy; Italian People's Party; The Daisy; Democratic Party
- Occupation: Lawyer

Francesco Sanna (born 14 April 1965) is an Italian lawyer and politician of the Democratic Party, who served as a member of the Regional Council of Sardinia (2004–2008), a senator (2008–2013) and deputy (2013–2018).
