= Paolo Pireddu =

Italian politician (born 1984)

President of the Province of Oristano
- Incumbent
- Assumed office 6 October 2025
- Preceded by: Extraordinary administration

Mayor of Villaurbana
- Incumbent
- Assumed office 6 June 2016
- Preceded by: Antonello Garau

Personal details
- Born: 31 March 1984 (age 42) Oristano, Sardinia, Italy
- Party: Brothers of Italy
- Occupation: Public employee

Paolo Pireddu (born 31 March 1984) is an Italian politician serving as president of the Province of Oristano since 2025. He has also served as mayor of Villaurbana since 2016.

Pireddu was the provincial coordinator of Brothers of Italy in Oristano from 2023 to 2025.

In September 2025, Pireddu was elected president of the Province of Oristano, defeating Andrea Abis, mayor of Cabras. Supported by a centre-right and Sardist coalition comprising Brothers of Italy, Forza Italia, Lega, Sardinian Action Party, Union of the Centre and Sardinian Reformers, he received 54.6% of the weighted vote. He took office on 6 October 2025.
