= Gianfranco Ganau =

Italian medic and politician

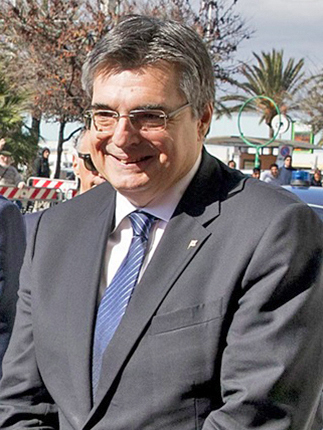

Mayor of Sassari
- In office 9 May 2005 – 28 March 2014
- Preceded by: Nanni Campus
- Succeeded by: Nicola Sanna

President of the Regional Council of Sardinia
- In office 20 March 2014 – 20 March 2019
- Preceded by: Claudia Lombardo
- Succeeded by: Michele Pais

Member of the Regional Council of Sardinia
- In office 20 March 2014 – 24 February 2024

Personal details
- Born: 3 March 1955 (age 71) Sassari, Italy
- Party: PDS (till 1998); DS (1998-2007); PD (since 2007)
- Education: University of Sassari
- Profession: Cardiologist

Gianfranco Ganau (born 3 March 1955) is an Italian physician and politician who served as mayor of Sassari from 2005 to 2014, and as president of the Regional Council of Sardinia from 2014 to 2019.

== Life and career ==
Graduated in Medicine from the University of Sassari, Ganau began his career as a cardiologist and became responsible for the emergency medical services in the province of Sassari and the province of Nuoro.

A member of the Democratic Party of the Left, in 1995 Ganau was elected city councilor of Sassari and lead till 2000 the Environmental Commission of the City Council. In 1998, Ganau joined the Democrats of the Left.

In 2005, Ganau became the centre-left candidate for the office of mayor of Sassari and won at the first round with the 58% of the votes. Five years later, in 2010, Ganau was re-elected Mayor at the first round with the 66% of the votes; according to a 2010 poll published on Il Sole 24 Ore, Ganau ranked as the fifth most popular mayor in Italy, while in 2011 he ranked as the third most popular mayor in Italy.

In 2014, Ganau left his mayoral office, one year before the natural end of his term, in order to run at the Sardinian regional election for the Democratic Party. From 2014 to 2019, Ganau has been president of the Regional Council of Sardinia.

Political offices
Preceded by Nanni Campus	Mayor of Sassari; 2005–2014	Succeeded by Nicola Sanna
