= Francesco Sanna =

Francesco Sanna may refer to:

- Francesco Sanna (born 1965), an Italian politician who served as regional councillor, deputy and senator
- Francesco Sanna (born 1979), an Italian politician who served as provincial president in Sardinia
