= Nicola Sanna =

Italian politician (born 1963)

Mayor of Sassari
- In office 31 May 2014 – 2 July 2019
- Preceded by: Gianfranco Ganau
- Succeeded by: Nanni Campus

Personal details
- Born: 4 May 1963 (age 63) Bochum, West Germany
- Party: More Europe (since 2023)
- Other political affiliations: PD (2014-2023)
- Education: University of Sassari
- Profession: Agronomist

Nicola Sanna (born 4 May 1963) is an Italian politician. He was elected mayor of Sassari on 25 May 2014 and took office on 31 May.

== See also ==
- 2014 Italian local elections
- List of mayors of Sassari

Political offices
Preceded by Gianfranco Ganau	Mayor of Sassari; 2014–2019	Succeeded by Nanni Campus
