= Giuseppe Mascia =

Italian politician (born 1975)

Mayor of Sassari
- Incumbent
- Assumed office 17 June 2024
- Preceded by: Nanni Campus

Metropolitan mayor of Sassari
- Incumbent
- Assumed office 30 September 2025
- Preceded by: Office established

Personal details
- Born: 25 October 1975 (age 50) Sassari, Sardinia, Italy
- Party: Five Star Movement; Democratic Party
- Education: University of Sassari; University of Cagliari
- Occupation: Teacher

Giuseppe Mascia (born 25 October 1975) is an Italian politician who has served as mayor of Sassari since 2024 and as metropolitan mayor of the Metropolitan City of Sassari since 2025.

== Life and career ==
Born in Sassari, Mascia graduated in philosophy from the University of Sassari and obtained a PhD in philosophical disciplines from the University of Cagliari in 2010. He subsequently worked as a researcher and secondary-school teacher.

Mascia entered politics with the Five Star Movement (M5S) and was elected to the municipal council of Sassari in 2014. He left the M5S in 2015 and joined the Democratic Party (PD). He was re-elected to the municipal council in 2019 and became provincial secretary of the PD in Sassari in 2023.

In the 2024 municipal elections, Mascia was elected mayor of Sassari in the first round with 51.08% of the vote. He was supported by a coalition including the PD, the M5S, Green and Left Alliance, Possible, and several civic lists.

On 30 September 2025, following the establishment of the Metropolitan City of Sassari, Mascia became its first metropolitan mayor.
