= Anna Sanna =

Italian politician (born 1948)

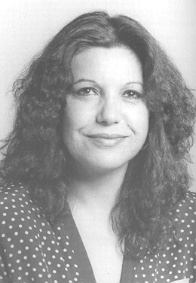

Mayor of Sassari
- In office 8 May 1995 – 3 May 2000
- Preceded by: Giacomo Spissu
- Succeeded by: Nanni Campus

Member of the Chamber of Deputies
- In office 25 June 1987 – 14 April 1994
- Constituency: Sardinia

Personal details
- Born: 6 July 1948 (age 78) Thiesi, Italy
- Party: PCI (before 1991); PDS (1991–1998); DS (1998–2007); PD (since 2007)
- Education: University of Sassari
- Profession: Teacher

Anna Filippa Sanna (born 6 July 1948) is an Italian teacher and a former politician. She was a member of the Chamber of Deputies for the Italian Communist Party and the Democratic Party of the Left between 1987 and 1994, before becoming the mayor of Sassari from 1995 to 2000 with the Democrats of the Left.

== Early life ==
Sanna was born in Thiesi on 6 July 1948. She received her higher school diploma and began work as a primary school teacher. She was a councillor for Samatzai, Cagliari, and later a member of the regional section of Sardinia. Sanna also served as a member of the central committee for the Italian Communist Party (PCI).

== Political career ==
Sanna was first elected as a deputy in the Chamber of Deputies for Cagliari-Sassari-Nuoro-Oristano on 25 June 1987. She was a representative of the PCI until 13 February 1991 when the party was dissolved, after which she joined the Democratic Party of the Left (PDS). She was a member of the social affairs commission. Sanna was re-elected in the 1992 general election and served as a member of the XI commission on labour. She left office on 14 April 1994.

She was the mayor of Sassari from 1995 to 2000 with the Democrats of the Left. She ran as an independent for a second term in 2000 but she lost to Gian Vittorio Campus, a candidate for the National Alliance.
