= List of presidents of the Province of Oristano =

President of the Province of Oristano
- Presidente della Provincia di Oristano
- Incumbent; Paolo Pireddu since 6 October 2025
- Term length: 4 years
- Inaugural holder: Antonio Franceschi
- Formation: 1975

The president of the Province of Oristano is the head of the provincial government in Oristano, Sardinia, Italy. The president oversees the administration of the province, coordinates the activities of the municipalities, and represents the province in regional and national matters.

Since October 2025, the office has been held by Paolo Pireddu of Brothers of Italy.

== History ==
The Province of Oristano was established in August 1974, becoming the fourth province of Sardinia. The first provincial elections were held in 1975, and Antonio Franceschi was elected as the first president. From 1975 until 1995, the president of the province was elected by the Provincial Council.

Following the reform of Italian provincial administrations, between 1995 and 2015 the president was elected directly by citizens through popular vote. Following the 2014 Delrio reform, presidents are elected by the Assembly of the mayors and municipal councillors of the province's municipalities, and the term of office was reduced from five to four years.

== List ==
No.	Portrait	Name	Term		Party
No.	Portrait	Name	Start	End	Party
1		Antonio Franceschi	1975	1979	Christian Democracy
2		Vincenzo Loy	1979	1984	Christian Democracy
3		Francesco Cabras	1984	1988	Italian Socialist Party
4		Maria Teresa Sechi	1988	1989	Sardinian Action Party
5		Peppino Chessa	30 March 1989	2 August 1990	Sardinian Action Party
6		Ezio Collu	21 August 1990	30 August 1994	Italian Socialist Party
7		Alfredo Stara	29 September 1994	24 April 1995	Italian Socialist Party
8		Gian Valerio Sanna	24 April 1995	12 July 1999	Italian People's Party
9		Mario Diana	17 April 2000	10 May 2005	National Alliance
10		Pasquale Onida	10 May 2005	1 June 2010	Fortza Paris
11		Massimiliano De Seneen	1 June 2010	29 May 2015	The People of Freedom
–		Massimo Torrente	29 May 2015	23 September 2024	Regional commissioner
–		Battistino Ghisu	23 September 2024	6 October 2025	Regional commissioner
12		Paolo Pireddu	6 October 2025	Incumbent	Brothers of Italy

== Sources ==
- "Storia amministrativa dell'ente". Ministero dell'Interno.
