= List of presidents of the Province of Sulcis Iglesiente =

President of the Province of Sulcis Iglesiente
- Presidente della Provincia del Sulcis Iglesiente
- Incumbent; Mauro Usai since 30 September 2025
- Term length: 4 years

The president of the Province of Sulcis Iglesiente is the head of the provincial government in Sulcis Iglesiente, Sardinia, Italy. The president oversees the administration of the province, coordinates the activities of the municipalities, and represents the province in regional and national matters.

Since September 2025, the office has been held by Mauro Usai of the Democratic Party.

== History ==
The office of president of the Province of Sulcis Iglesiente is the successor of the corresponding office of the former Province of Carbonia-Iglesias. The latter was established in 2001 as part of the reorganization of the provinces of Sardinia and became operational after the first provincial elections held in 2005. The president was elected directly by citizens every five years. The province was abolished in 2016 as part of the regional reorganization of Sardinian provinces.

In 2021, the Autonomous Region of Sardinia approved the establishment of the new Province of Sulcis Iglesiente, which became operational on 1 April 2025. The first election of the president and provincial council of the new province was held on 29 September 2025, resulting in the election of Mauro Usai.

== List ==
=== Presidents of Carbonia-Iglesias (2005–2016) ===
| No. | Portrait | Name | Term of office | | Party |
| No. | Portrait | Name | Start | End | Party |
|---|---|---|---|---|---|
| 1 | | Pierfranco Gaviano | 9 May 2005 | 31 May 2010 | The Daisy; Democratic Party; Union of the Centre |
| 2 | | Salvatore Cherchi | 31 May 2010 | 1 July 2013 | Democratic Party |
| – | | Roberto Neroni (Special Commissioner) | 1 July 2013 | 31 December 2014 | — |
| – | | Giorgio Sanna (Special Commissioner) | 31 December 2014 | 20 April 2016 | — |

=== Presidents of Sulcis Iglesiente (2025–present) ===
| No. | Portrait | Name | Term of office | | Party |
| No. | Portrait | Name | Start | End | Party |
|---|---|---|---|---|---|
| – | | Sergio Murgia (Extraordinary Administrator) | 1 October 2024 | 30 September 2025 | ― |
| 1 | | Mauro Usai | 30 September 2025 | Incumbent | Democratic Party |

== Sources ==
- "Storia amministrativa dell'ente". Ministero dell'Interno.
