= Giuseppe Abozzi =

Italian politician (1882–1962)

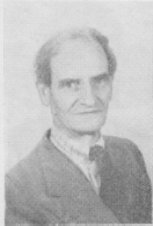

Personal details
- Born: 26 September 1882 Sassari
- Died: 25 November 1962 (aged 80)
- Parent: Michele Abozzi (father)

Giuseppe Abozzi (26 September 1882 – 25 November 1962) was an Italian politician.

Abozzi was born in Sassari. He was elected to the Constituent Assembly of Italy in 1946 as a representative of the Italian Socialist Party, but on 6 July 1946 he switched allegiances and joined the right-wing Common Man's Front, which he represented in the Constituent Assembly from 1946 to 1948.
