= Massimiliano De Seneen =

Italian politician (born 1950)

President of the Province of Oristano
- In office 1 June 2010 – 29 May 2015
- Preceded by: Pasquale Onida
- Succeeded by: Extraordinary administration

Member of the Chamber of Deputies
- In office 14 September 2005 – 27 April 2006

Personal details
- Born: 3 January 1950 (age 76) Bologna, Italy
- Party: National Alliance; The People of Freedom

Massimiliano De Seneen (born 3 January 1950) is an Italian politician who served as president of the Province of Oristano from 2010 to 2015. He previously served as a member of the Chamber of Deputies for National Alliance, replacing Agostino Ghiglia during the 14th legislature.
