= Michele Abozzi =

Italian lawyer and politician (1857–1946)

Member of the Chamber of Deputies
- In office 1904–1919

Personal details
- Born: 1857 Sassari, Kingdom of Sardinia
- Died: 1946 (aged 88–89) Sassari, Italy
- Children: Giuseppe Abozzi
- Occupation: Lawyer

Michele Abozzi (1857 – 1946) was an Italian lawyer and politician who served as a member of the Chamber of Deputies of the Kingdom of Italy from 1904 to 1919. He was also active in local government in Sassari, serving as president of the province and president of the provincial council.
