= Mauro Usai =

Italian politician (born 1988)

President of the Province of Sulcis Iglesiente
- Incumbent
- Assumed office 30 September 2025
- Preceded by: Office established

Mayor of Iglesias
- Incumbent
- Assumed office 26 June 2018

Personal details
- Born: 2 November 1988 (age 37) Iglesias, Sardinia, Italy
- Party: Democratic Party
- Education: University of Cagliari
- Occupation: Commercial consultant

Mauro Usai (born 2 November 1988) is an Italian politician of the Democratic Party who has served as president of the Province of Sulcis Iglesiente since 2025 and as mayor of Iglesias since 2018.

== Life and career ==
Usai was born in Iglesias in 1988. He obtained a diploma from the Giorgio Asproni Scientific High School in 2007 and subsequently graduated in political science. From September 2008 to May 2009, he carried out civil service activities with the provincial committee of ARCI in Cagliari. Since September 2016, he has worked as a freelance administrative and commercial consultant.

Usai was elected to the municipal council of Iglesias in 2013 as a candidate of the Democratic Party. He was elected mayor on 26 June 2018 and was subsequently re-elected in 2023. In September 2025, Usai was elected first president of the Province of Sulcis Iglesiente, supported by an agreement among the mayors of 22 of the province's 24 municipalities. He received 69,547 weighted votes and was officially proclaimed president on 30 September 2025.
