= Benito Orgiana =

Italian politician (1938–2021)

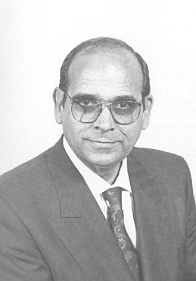
Benito Orgiana

Benito Orgiana (10 February 1938 – 2 April 2021) was an Italian politician.

Born in Orroli on 10 February 1938, Orgiana served on local legislative bodies including the Cagliari municipal council until his 1992 election to the Chamber of Deputies. He served until 1994, as a member of the Italian Republican Party. He was a cofounder of the Fortza Paris party, formed in 2001, and served as president of Istituto Autonomo Case Popolari
