= Sardinia Project =

Sardinia Project Progetto Sardegna
- Abbreviation: PS
- Leader: Renato Soru
- Founder: Renato Soru
- Founded: 24 November 2003 (1st); 13 November 2023 (2nd)
- Dissolved: 14 October 2007 (1st)
- Split from: Democrats of the Left (1st); Democratic Party (2nd)
- Merged into: Democratic Party (1st)
- Ideology: Social democracy Progressivism; Sardinian regionalism Sardinian autonomism
- Political position: Centre-left
- National affiliation: The Union (1st)
- Colours: Purple; Orange
- Regional Council of Sardinia: 0 / 60

Website
- progettosardegna.it

Sardinia Project (Progetto Sardegna, PS) is a social-democratic regionalist political party active in Sardinia, Italy. It was founded in 2003 by entrepreneur Renato Soru, who was previously associated with the Democrats of the Left.

In the 2004 Sardinian regional election, Soru went on to be elected president of Sardinia and PS obtained 7.8% of the vote, making it the fourth largest party in the region. In 2007, PS was merged into the Democratic Party (PD). Soru was not re-elected president in the 2009 Sardinian regional election but served as regional secretary of the PD from 2014 to 2016.

In the run-up of the 2024 Sardinian regional election, Soru left the PD, revived PS, and started a new bid for president of Sardinia. In the election, Soru won 8.7% of the vote and PS 3.5% of the vote and no seats in the Regional Council.

== Election results ==
=== Regional elections ===
Election	Votes	%	Seats	+/–
2004	66,690	7.86	7 / 85	New
2024	23,867	3.46	0 / 60	Steady
