= Italian Social Democratic Party =

Italian Social Democratic Party may refer to:

- Social Democracy (Democrazia Sociale), officially Italian Social Democratic Party (Partito Democratico Sociale Italiano), political party in Italy, 1922–1926
- Italian Democratic Socialist Party (Partito Socialista Democratico Italiano), political party in Italy, 1947–1998
- Italian Democratic Socialist Party (Partito Socialista Democratico Italiano), political party in Italy, 2004–present
- Social Democracy (Socialdemocrazia), political party in Italy, 2022–present
