= Iglesias, Sardinia =

Iglesias Igrèsias (Sardinian)
- Comune
- Comune di Iglesias
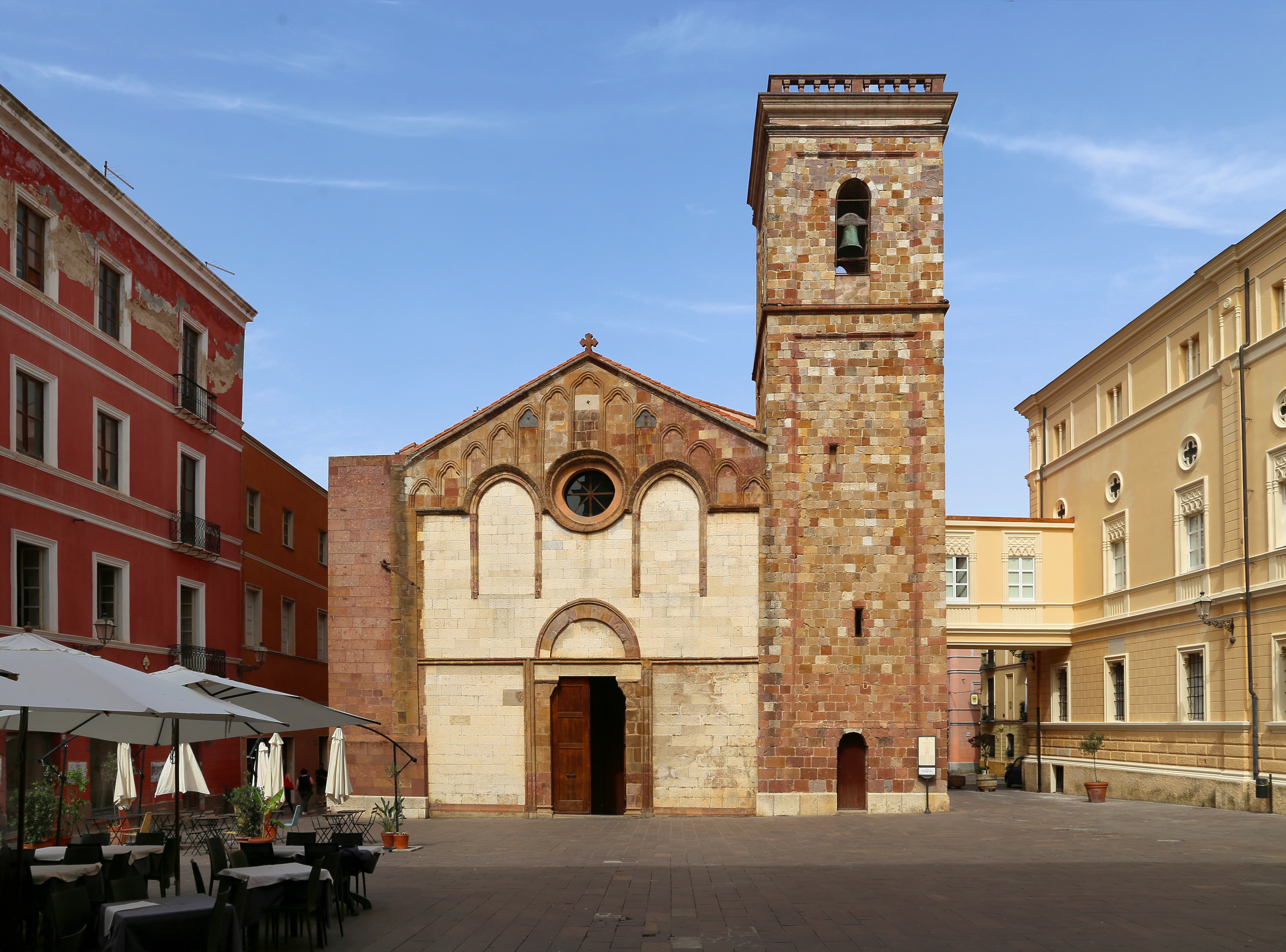
- Cathedral

- Coat of arms

- Location within Sardinia
- Coordinates: 39°19′N 8°32′E
- Country: Italy
- Region: Sardinia
- Province: Sulcis Iglesiente
- Frazioni: Barega, Bindua, Corongiu, Masua, Monte Agruxiau, Monteponi, Nebida, San Benedetto, San Giovanni Miniera, Tanì

Government
  - Mayor: Mauro Usai

Area
  - Total: 208.23 km^{2} (80.40 sq mi)
- Elevation: 200 m (660 ft)

Population (2026)
  - Total: 24,409
  - Density: 117.22/km^{2} (303.60/sq mi)
- Demonym(s): Iglesienti; Igresientis
- Time zone: UTC+1 (CET)
  - Summer (DST): UTC+2 (CEST)
- Postal code: 09016
- Dialing code: 0781
- Patron saint: Santa Chiara
- Saint day: 11 August
- Website: Official website

Iglesias (Italian pronunciation: [iˈɡlɛːzjas], locally [iˈɡlezjas]; from Spanish: [iˈɣlesjas]; Sardinian: Igrèsias) is a town and comune (municipality), as well as the co-capital, along with Carbonia of the Province of Sulcis Iglesiente in the autonomous island region of Sardinia in Italy. With a population of 24,409, it is also the 2nd-largest town in the province and the 11th-largest in Sardinia.

Under Aragonese and Spanish control Iglesias was one of the most important royal cities on Sardinia (which depended directly on the king), and it is the seat of the Roman Catholic Diocese of Iglesias. At an elevation of 190 metres (620 ft) in the hills of southwestern Sardinia, it was the centre of a mining district from which lead, zinc, and silver were extracted. Iglesias was also a centre for the distillation of sulfuric acid.

== History ==
=== Prehistory and ancient history ===
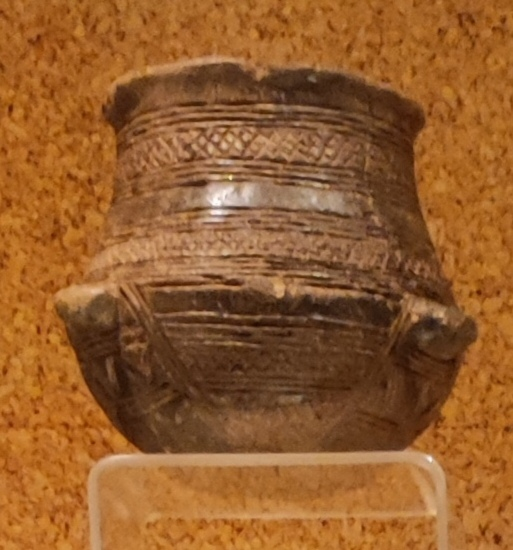
Bell Beaker from the Grotta della Volpe (Fox cave)

The area around present-day Iglesias was inhabited in prehistory, with the oldest traces of human settlement dating to the Neolithic. The fourth-millennium-BC domus de Janas, attributed to the Ozieri culture, were discovered in the mountainous region of San Benedetto. Other pre-Nuragic finds attributed to the Monte Claro, Bell Beaker and Bonnanaro cultures were discovered in nearby caves, followed by evidence of a Nuragic, Punic and Roman presence. Ancient Roman sources record a city known as Metalla, perhaps located along Iglesias' border with Fluminimaggiore.

=== Medieval history ===
During the ninth century AD, after a period of human absence, a small town arose with a Byzantine church (the Church of San Salvatore). When the Byzantine influence left Sardinia, the southern part of the island was controlled by the Judicate of Cagliari.

After the fall of the Judicate in 1258, south-western Sardinia (the curatorias of Cixerri and Sulcis) was assigned to the Della Gherardesca family; the Cixerri region was controlled by Ugolino della Gherardesca. The count took advantage of the region's silver resources and established a city: Latin: Villa Ecclesiae (Churchville), renovating old buildings and constructing new ones. The Della Gherardesca family built the medieval Castle of Salvaterra, defence walls, a hospital and an aqueduct.

After Ugolino's March 1289 death in Pisa's Tower of Muda (where he was imprisoned in the summer of 1288 for sedition and treason), his Sardinian holdings in the Cixerri reason were inherited by his son, Guelfo della Gherardesca; escaped from Pisa in 1288, he had settled in the Villa di Chiesa. Guelfo, hostile to the Pisan government, tried to seize one-sixth of the former Judicate of Cagliari (Sulcis) owned by Gherardo della Gherardesca's heirs and occupied Villamassargia's Castle of Gioiosa Guardia. Pisa's response was swift; in 1295 republican troops, supported by the forces of Marianus II of Arborea, attacked Villa di Chiesa. Guelfo was wounded near Domusnovas; after trying to escape to Sassari, he died from an infection in the hospital of Siete Fuentes. Villa di Chiesa was briefly administered by Arborea before falling under Pisan control between 1301 and 1302.

Under Pisan domination, Villa di Chiesa was one of the most important and populous cities on Sardinia thanks to its lead and silver resources. At the beginning of the 14th century, its mines produced an estimated 10 percent of Europe's circulating silver. The city, primarily inhabited by Sardinians and Pisans, also housed other communities from Tuscany and the Italian Peninsula, Corsica and Germany. The city was governed by the Breve di Villa di Chiesa, its original legal code, a 1327 version of which is preserved in the municipal archives. A mint was established in the city.

Conquered by the Aragonese on February 7, 1324, after an over seven-month siege, Villa di Chiesa was the first Sardinian city to fall to the Iberians and the first city of the new Kingdom of Sardinia to be recognised as a royal city in June 1327. During the Aragonese period, the city's name changed from Villa di Chiesa to Iglesias.

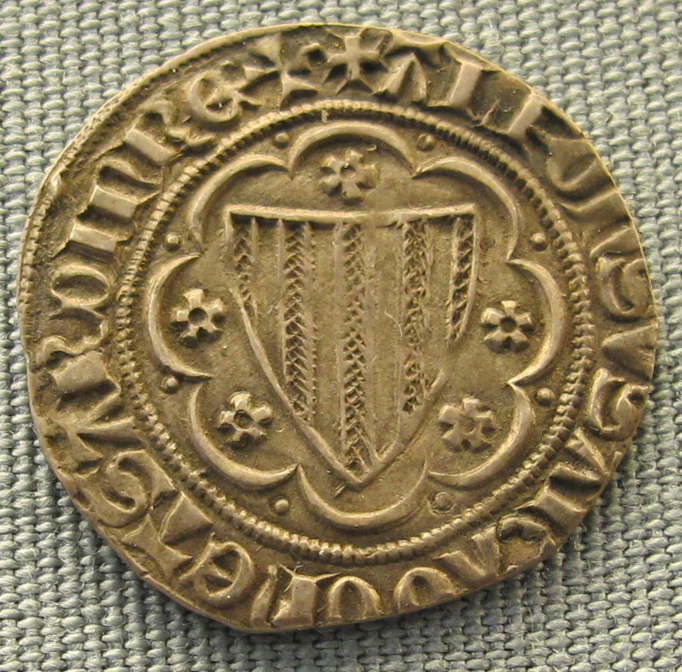
14th-century real commemorating Alfonso IV of Aragon, coined in the Iglesian mint

During the transition from Pisan to Aragonese rule, 6,000–7,000 people lived in Villa di Chiesa; however, the Black Plague of 1348 killed much of the population. In late 1353 a revolt began against the Aragon government, siding with Marianus IV of Arborea (who had begun hostilities against the Crown of Aragon). After the 1355 peace of Sanluri, the city returned to Aragon; in 1365, with the resumption of a conflict between the Judicate of Arborea and the Kingdom of Sardinia, Villa di Chiesa was recaptured by Marianus IV of Arborea. The city remained in Arborean hands until 1388 when, after the treaty between Eleanor of Arborea and John I of Aragon, it was returned to the Aragonese. In 1391 the city again revolted against the Aragonese, welcoming the judge's army led by Brancaleone Doria. It was seized by the Iberians in the summer of 1409.

In 1436, Alfonso V of Aragon gave the city in fief to Eleonora Carroz for 5,000 gold florins; however, after paying a ransom Villa di Chiesa regained the status of a royal city in 1450.

=== Modern history ===
In 1720, after almost 400 years of Aragonese-Spanish rule, the city passed with the rest of Sardinia to the House of Savoy. Since the mid-19th century, thanks to the reopening of nearby mines, Iglesias has experienced a period of economic, social and cultural renewal. Many miners, workers and technicians from elsewhere on Sardinia and northern Italy settled in the city, whose population increased from 5,000 to 6,000 during the 1850s to about 20,000 in the early 20th century. After the Second World War the Sardinian mining sector was in crisis, the effects of which involved the Iglesiente's mines and the town of Iglesias.

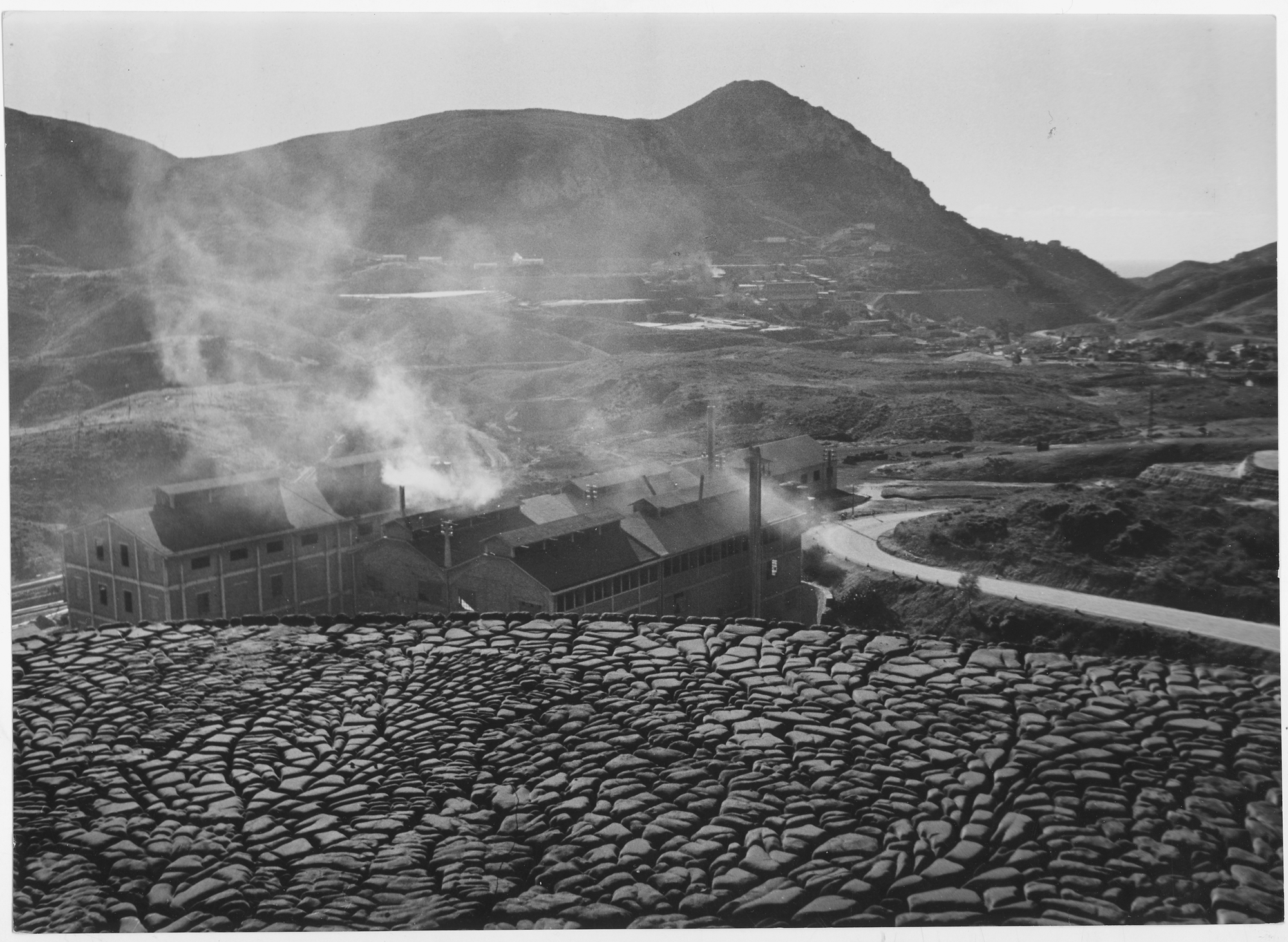
Steam rising from the Monteponi mine, around 1948–1955

== Climate ==
According to the Köppen climate classification, Iglesias experiences a hot-summer Mediterranean climate (Csa).

Climate data for Iglesias (1981–2010)
Month	Jan	Feb	Mar	Apr	May	Jun	Jul	Aug	Sep	Oct	Nov	Dec	Year
Mean daily maximum °C (°F)	13.2 (55.8)	13.5 (56.3)	16.1 (61.0)	18.4 (65.1)	23.7 (74.7)	28.4 (83.1)	32.1 (89.8)	32.5 (90.5)	27.7 (81.9)	23.3 (73.9)	17.4 (63.3)	13.9 (57.0)	21.7 (71.0)
Daily mean °C (°F)	9.3 (48.7)	9.5 (49.1)	11.6 (52.9)	13.7 (56.7)	18.1 (64.6)	22.2 (72.0)	25.4 (77.7)	25.9 (78.6)	22.2 (72.0)	18.5 (65.3)	13.5 (56.3)	10.3 (50.5)	16.7 (62.0)
Mean daily minimum °C (°F)	5.4 (41.7)	5.4 (41.7)	7.0 (44.6)	8.9 (48.0)	12.4 (54.3)	15.9 (60.6)	18.6 (65.5)	19.2 (66.6)	16.6 (61.9)	13.6 (56.5)	9.6 (49.3)	6.7 (44.1)	11.6 (52.9)
Average precipitation mm (inches)	80.4 (3.17)	71.8 (2.83)	56.7 (2.23)	73.6 (2.90)	35.2 (1.39)	19.8 (0.78)	1.6 (0.06)	7.5 (0.30)	49.3 (1.94)	48.2 (1.90)	111.5 (4.39)	102.2 (4.02)	657.8 (25.91)
Source: Sistema nazionale protezione ambiente

== Demographics ==
Historical population
Year	Pop.	±%
1861	4,951	—
1871	7,222	+45.9%
1881	10,679	+47.9%
1901	19,879	+86.2%
1911	20,505	+3.1%
1921	18,878	−7.9%
1931	22,335	+18.3%
1936	20,685	−7.4%
1951	26,146	+26.4%
1961	28,004	+7.1%
1971	28,081	+0.3%
1981	30,119	+7.3%
1991	30,134	+0.0%
2001	28,170	−6.5%
2011	27,674	−1.8%
2021	25,382	−8.3%
Source: ISTAT

As of 2026, the population is 24,409, of which 48.2% are male, and 51.8% are female. Minors make up 10.4% of the population, and seniors make up 31.0%.

=== Immigration ===
Foreign population by country of birth (2025)
Country	Population
Romania	85
Senegal	63
Germany	45
Ukraine	45
Morocco	43
China	37
Nigeria	28
Switzerland	25
United Kingdom	25
Argentina	24
Poland	24
France	23
Pakistan	22
Russia	20
Brazil	19

As of 2025, immigrants make up 3.2% of the total population. The 5 largest foreign countries of birth are Romania, Senegal, Germany, Ukraine, and Morocco.

== Economy ==
Iglesias' economy has waxed and waned because it has been largely focused on mineral resources. During the 21st century, with little surviving mining activity, the town has tried to emphasise industrial tourism and medieval tourism with a medieval parade, a tournament of archers and a living game of chess.

== Sights ==
Map of the historical center

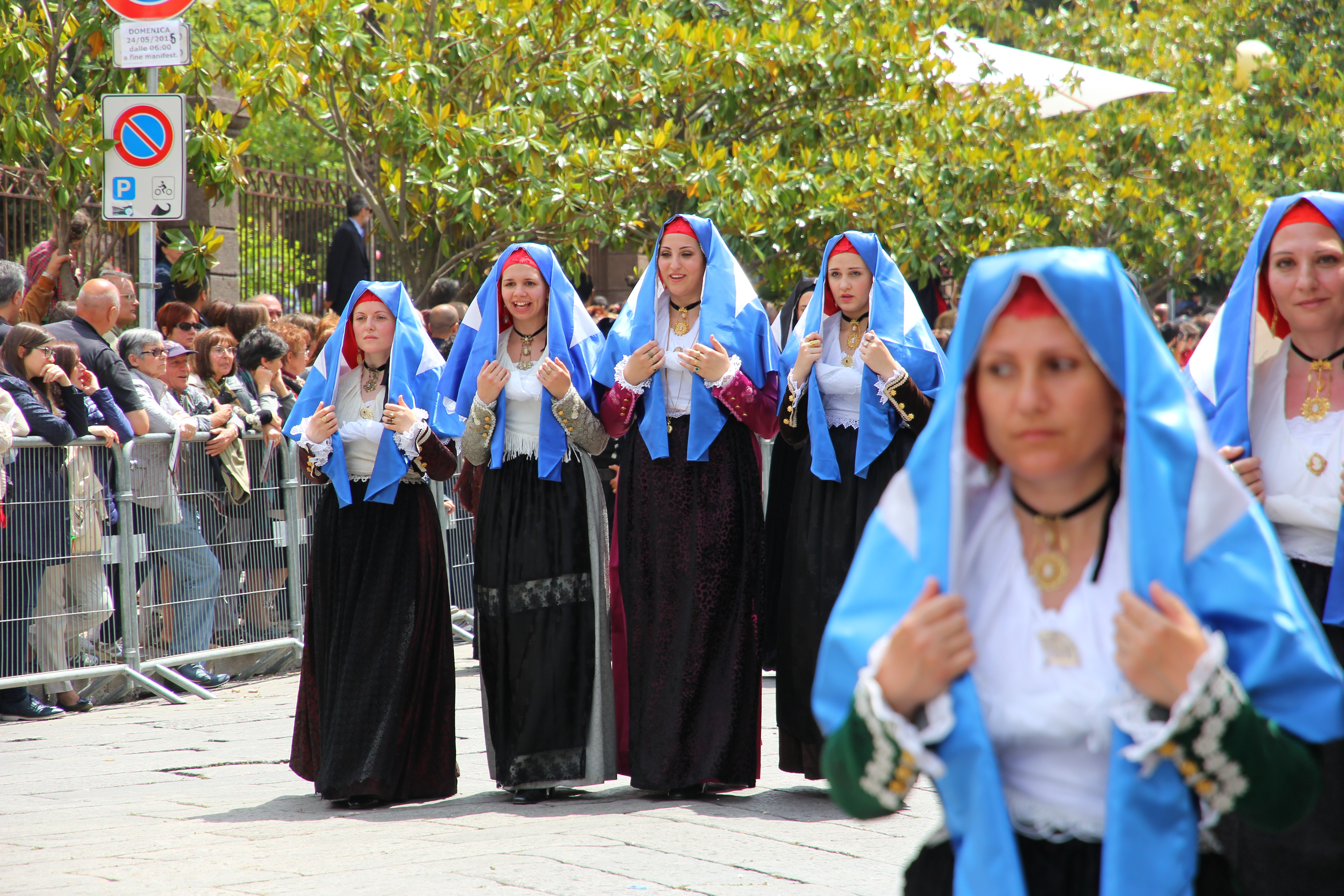
Women in traditional dress

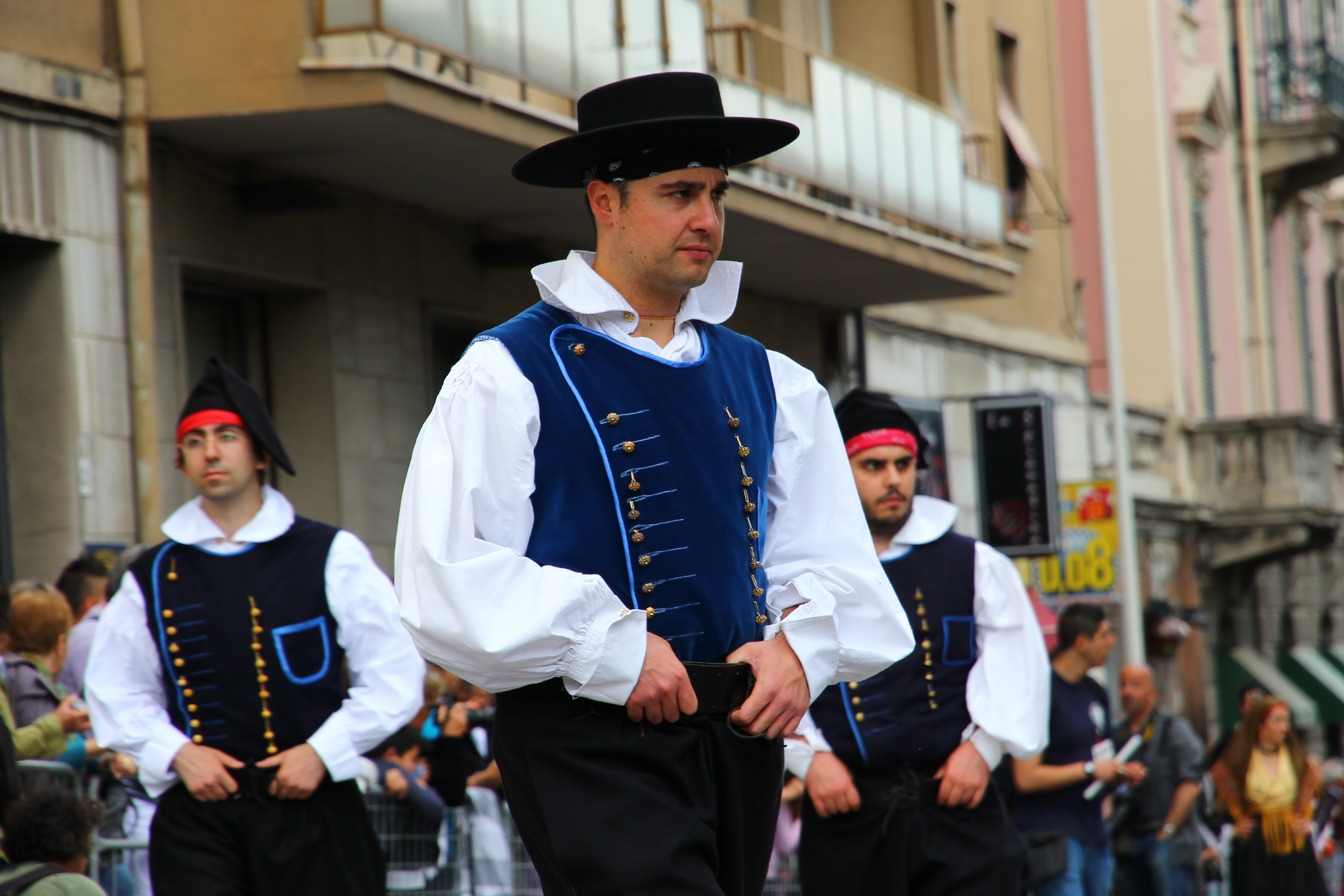
Men in traditional dress

=== Castle of Salvaterra ===
The Castle of Salvaterra was probably built as part of urbanization after 1258 under Ugolino della Gheradesca. It was designed as a bulwark from which to survey the town and its surroundings as far as the silver mines.

In 1297 Sardinia and Corsica were made subject to the Crown of Aragon by Pope Boniface VIII, but were not taken possession until 1324. The castle of San Guantino changed its name to Salvaterra and its status; a 1325 stone slab calls it castris regalis, a royal castle.

The square castle's northern and eastern sides, built in courses of stone alternating with brick, seem to adhere to the original medieval plan and confer solidity. It had a chapel dedicated first to San Guantino and later to Eulalia of Barcelona. The castle well has been rebuilt in its internal courtyard.

=== Santa Chiara Cathedral ===
Construction of the Santa Chiara Cathedral was an initiative for demographic and urban development undertaken by the Donoratico della Gherardesca family. The cathedral has a variety of architectural styles. Over the centuries it has been transformed several times by successive rulers or restoration, particularly during the 19th century). The cathedral's façade, with a pitched roof, is divided into two parts by a horizontal, moulded cornice at the level of the architrave over the doorway.

It has a large nave with six side chapels, and a cross-vaulted roof supported on pillars with carved capitals. The cathedral's bell tower houses a 1337 Andrea Pisano bronze bell; the tower was plastered and its spire added in 1862. The Museum of Sacred Art is in the cathedral's crypt.

In the late Twentieth century the church was closed in order to undergo a restoration that will last until 2013. During the restoration, the floor tiles made of white marble and the Nineteenth century altar were removed.

=== Church of San Francesco ===
The Church of San Francesco has a gabled façade with smooth stonework; the door in its centre is surmounted by a rose window and flanked by two side oculi. Its wood-ceilinged nave is divided into seven bays, flanked by seven side chapels; the chapels and the presbytery were added during the 16th century. The chapels all have simple cross vaulting (meeting in a hanging pendant), except for the Crucifix Chapel. The stone choir replaced the original wooden choir, which was demolished at the beginning of the 20th century. The church has a marble font and artworks in the chapels, including a retablo by Antioco Mainas. The monastery, with the San Francesco Cloister, was annexed to the church during the 16th century.

=== Church of Santa Maria di Valverde ===
The Church of Santa Maria di Valverde is outside the town walls and nearly contemporary with the cathedral, with similar style and structure. Like the cathedral, it has a typical Romanesque style with Gothic features. The church's façade underwent conservation and restoration until the twentieth century. Built of pink trachyte ashlar, it is divided into two parts by a horizontal, moulded cornice. Its nave originally had a lower, wooden roof; it ends in a large, square, cross-vaulted presbytery with four pendants. The central pendant, larger than the others, depicts the Madonna and child.

=== Medieval fortifications ===
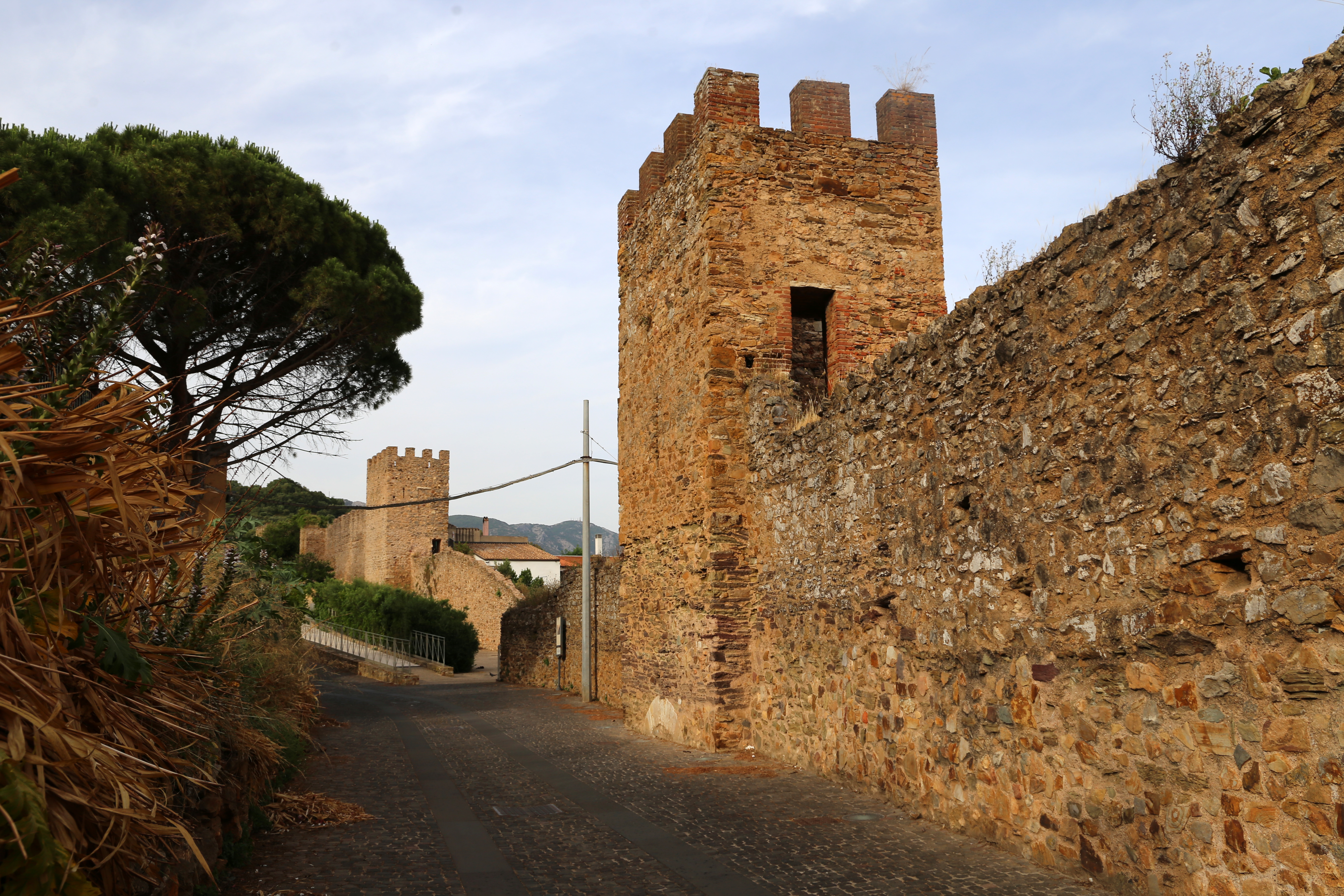
City walls

Pisan walls surround the city's historic centre, following its irregular outline and using its incline with the Castle of Salvaterra. Although urban expansion led to the incorporation of several stretches of wall into private homes, the remnants retain the features of medieval military fortifications: blind façades of mixed stones arranged in horizontal courses to create an uneven mass, providing resistance to attack. With 23 towers, the walls could be passed through four gateways: Porta Maestra, Porta Castello, Porta Sant Antonio and Porta Nuova.

=== Town Hall ===
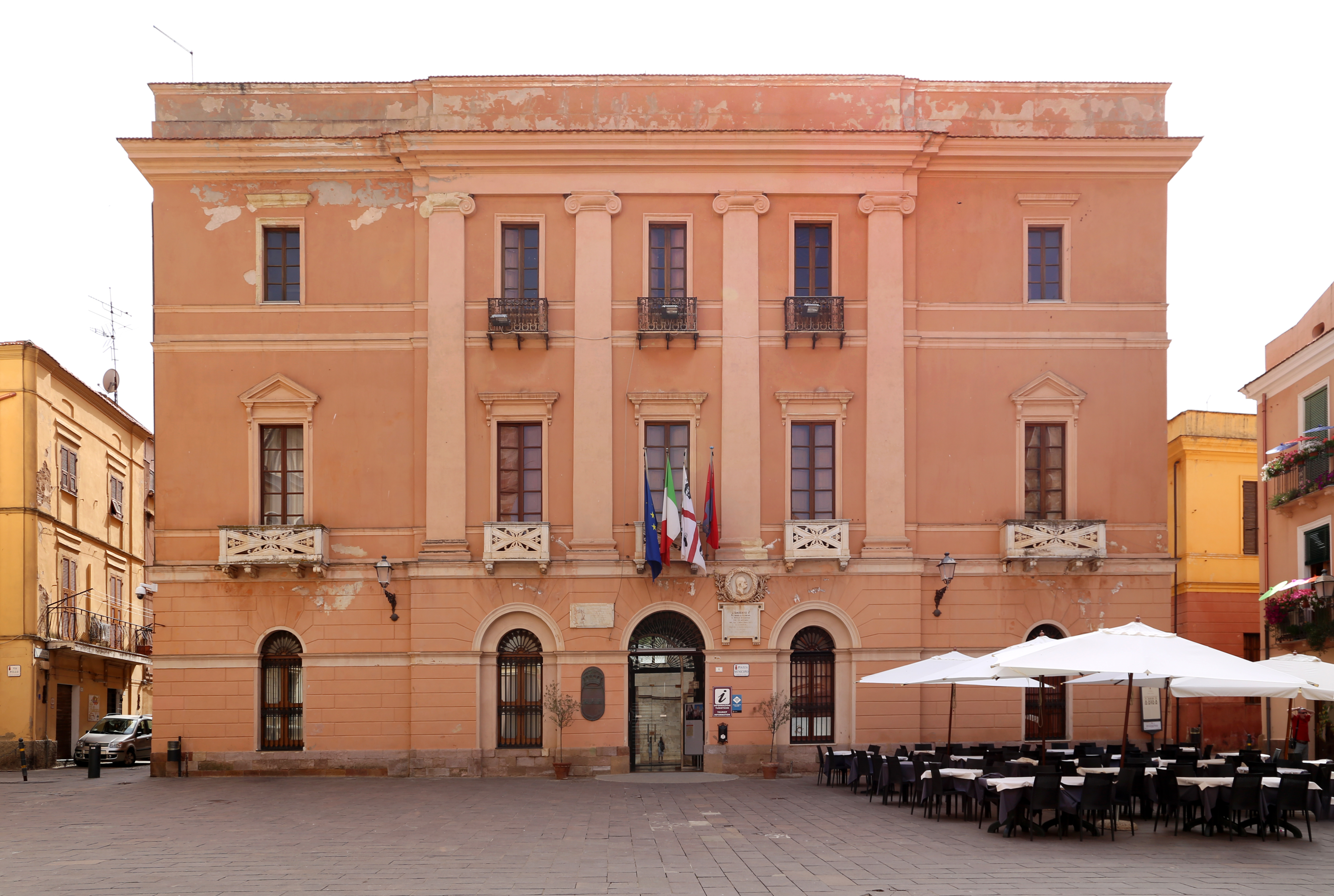
Town Hall

The former Town Hall is at the heart of the historic town centre relative to the medieval walls. According to plans by civil engineer Antonio Cao Pinna, it was built by the Vincenzo Sulcis company between 1871 and 1872. The façade, set on a base of volcanic-stone ashlar, is divided horizontally by stringcourse cornices. The council meeting room was decorated during the 1920s in a design by Sardinian sculptor Francesco Ciusa and painter and illustrator Remo Branca. Artist Carmelo Floris created a triptych of panel paintings which decorates the rear walls.

=== Sanctuary of Madonna delle Grazie ===
The Sanctuary of Madonna delle Grazie dates to the 12th and 13th centuries, and was initially dedicated to the Cagliari martyr San Saturno. The communities which have altered the building can be seen in its façade. The oldest portion is in the centre.

The church nave is divided into six bays by pointed trachyte arches supporting a wooden vault with exposed beams. Openings in the thick outer walls simulate chapels. Two chapels are on the sides of the presbytery: one dedicated to the Sacred Heart of Jesus and the other to Saint Francis.

=== Mining Art Museum ===
The museum was conceived in 1998 by a group of mining men who wanted a tangible reminder of their origins so the history of their land would not be forgotten. Housed in the basement of the Giorgio Asproni Mining Institute, it displays scale model reproductions, newspaper articles about life in the mines and a collection of photographs. The museum also contains various machinery for excavation, drilling and transport and a reconstruction of a mechanical workshop with modern machinery. The tunnels underneath the building are reached by a ramp along a railway, along which elements of work in the mines have been reconstructed.

=== Archive ===
The archive preserves the history of Villa di Chiesa from the Catalan-Aragonese, Spanish and Savoy periods. The documents begin with Il Breve di Villa di Chiesa, a book of laws dating back to 1327. Written on parchment (possibly mutton), only a few pages are missing. Its text, in Gothic script, was written in the Pisan dialect. The book was the result of a process of legislative drafting which began during Donoratico rule and ended with Aragon dominion. The definitive version, in four books, dates back to the period of direct rule by Pisa.

=== Porto Flavia ===
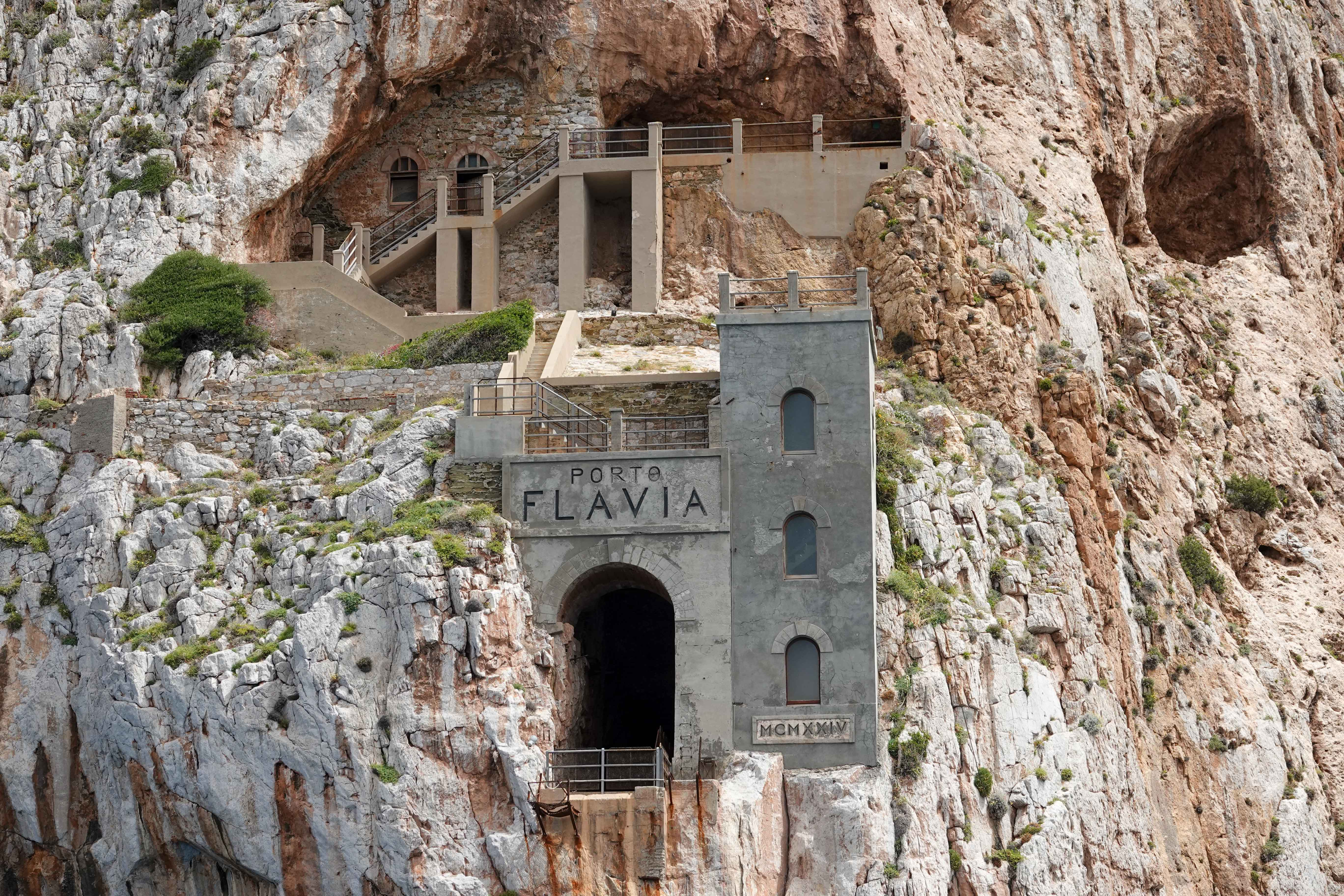
Porto Flavia

The harbour has an important position in innovation and technology in Sardinian mining construction. The Belgian Vieille Montagne company appointed engineer Cesare Vecelli to conduct a planning study from 1922 to 1924 of reducing the cost of transporting ore from the mine to the port. A tunnel runs through the mountain for 600 metres (2,000 feet) before opening high above the sea. The opening consists of a façade with a large arch beneath the inscription "Porto Flavia", flanked by a tower. The work consisted of excavating nine reservoirs in the mountain for the ore by enlarging natural caverns. The nine large rooms open into two tunnels, one on top of the other, opposite the islet known as Pan di Zucchero (Sugarloaf).

=== Monteponi mine ===
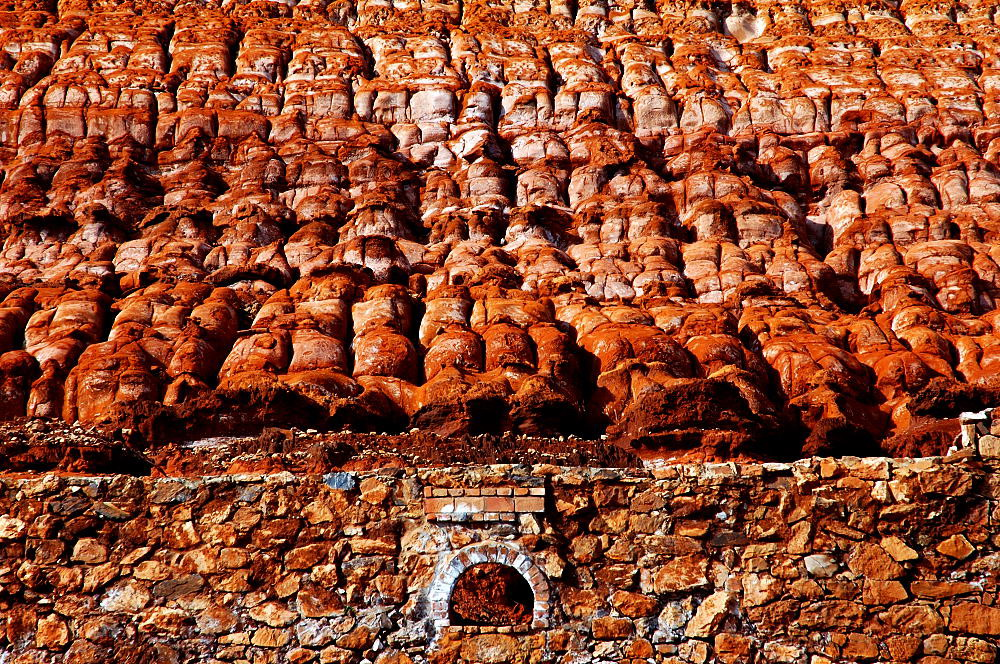
Monteponi

When mining activity in the region began is uncertain, but "Monte Paone" was mentioned in the 1324 will of Berto da San Miniato (a trader from Pisa). Unprofitable mining operations alternated between the government and private companies until 1850, when investors led by the Ligurian Paolo Antonio Nicolay founded the Monteponi company as a 30-year mining project using existing structures. The four-level settlement is a workers' village. A 2008 project by architects Herzog & de Meuron planned to restore the industrial area for tourism and culture.

=== Saint Michele Church ===
Dating to the Aragonese period, the church is linked to the Archfraternity of the Holy Virgin of Santo Monte. The only feature distinguishing the façade from a secular building is its oculus and moulded, arched lintel. The interior is a small hall and nave, divided into two bays by a pointed arch. At the centre of the presbytery, a stone table is decorated with a relief of the Last Supper; behind it is a niche with a statue of Saint Michael. A 1727 chapel dedicated to the Mysteries, contains processional statues to commemorate the Passion of Jesus. A stone font, with four fish carved into the bowl, dates to the 16th or 17th century.

=== Saint Giuseppe Church ===
This church was built near the church of Santa Lucia, with a hospital annex run by brothers. As Santa Lucia fell into disuse, the Sanctuary of San Giuseppe became the new location of the Confraternity of Santa Lucia (which later changed its name). Its simple facade is surmounted by a tympanum; an oculus in the centre has coloured glass forming an image of Saint Joseph and the child Jesus. The nave has a vault of pointed arches and the presbytery, with a square apse, has cross-vaulting. Two chapels are furnished with simulacra, including a wooden niche.

=== Purissima Church ===
As the only example in Iglesias of Counter-Reformation architecture, the predominant feature of this church is the correspondence between its interior and exterior. The facade has white plaster contrasting with red trachyte. Its bell tower, which functions as a clock tower, was rebuilt during the 20th century. The interior has a large nave with three side chapels and marble ornamentation. Decorative features added after 1774, when the Jesuits left the city after the suppression of their order, contrast with the church's general sobriety; its paintings date to the early 20th century, in fact. An exhibition on sacred architecture in Sulcis-Iglesiente is in the church's underground rooms.

=== Saint Domenico Church ===
The church is distinctive for its sober, decorative façade, reminiscent of embroidery. Framed by Corinthian columns and an architrave engraved with the Cannavera coat of arms, the doorway is in Gothic-Catalan style. The nave has a barrel vault, divided into four spans by pointed arches. Two chapels are on each side, dedicated to the corporations which financed the work. The chapels added in 1910 differ from the original building in displaying its exposed rock. Four memorial tablets include one dedicated to Bishop Nicolò Cannavera, who built the church.

=== Saint Marcello Church ===
Saint Marcello Church was the headquarters of the San Marcello brotherhood and was adjacent to the Church of San Francesco until the end of the 19th century, when it was moved to make room for a primary school. The reconstruction project was planned by engineer Luigi Degrossi in 1901 with material recovered from the original church, including slate slabs for the inside flooring. The red, sloping neo-Gothic façade, its doorway containing a pointed arch, is all that remains of the original building. At the cusp of the arch, a Greek orthodox cross points to the rose window above; the top of the façade has a motif of small Gothic arches, identical to those on the windows of the bishop's palace.

=== Saint Antonio Abbot ===
Saint Antonio Abbot dates back prior to the construction of the town (after 1258). On a hill near the Cixerri Valley, the church would have been at the centre of a small village. The building, which has undergone much reconstruction, has a simple facade with a gabled roof in the Byzantine style. Its facade indicates the church's age, traces of which remain in the present sacristy; neighbouring buildings have absorbed one of the original building's three naves. Inside is a fairly-small, quadrangular room with four pointed arches marking four bays and terminating in a large, horseshoe-shaped apse.

=== Saint Salvatore Church ===
Saint Salvatore Church, also dating to before the city's construction, is outside the city walls. A comparison with the Church of Santa Croce in Ittireddu dates it to the ninth or tenth century. The church follows the structural layout of other churches of average size, with a cruciform plan built near developing settlements. The simple building has a sloping facade, dominated by an arched doorway from which its weight is distributed to the external walls. The nave crosses the transept and ends in a window, tracing the ancient apse.

=== Saint Francesco Cloister ===
The church and monastery of San Francesco belonged to the Friars Conventual Minor in Sardinia. The cloister was an open space, surrounded on four sides by porticos. The monastery includes wings developed according to the model of open ground-floor loggias, arranged around a green area accessed through broad arches of pink trachyte. It was heavily damaged during World War II (when it was used as an air-raid shelter), but part of the original complex has been restored.

=== Cemetery ===
The cemetery covers the area between Via Cappuccini and Su Pardu, following a plan with intersecting avenues marking squares. At the centre, a stairway leads to the chapel on the principal avenue. Developed during successive enlargements, the cemetery does not follow a plan; certain aspects stand out, such as the Avenue of the Children. Its nucleus is eclectic in its outer railings, funeral stones, urns, owls and angels flanking the stairway. The entrance from Via Cappuccini separates the sober Liberty-style flowers and Masonic symbols on one side from memorials to the war dead on the other. It includes sculptures by Giuseppe Sartorio.

=== Piazza Sella ===
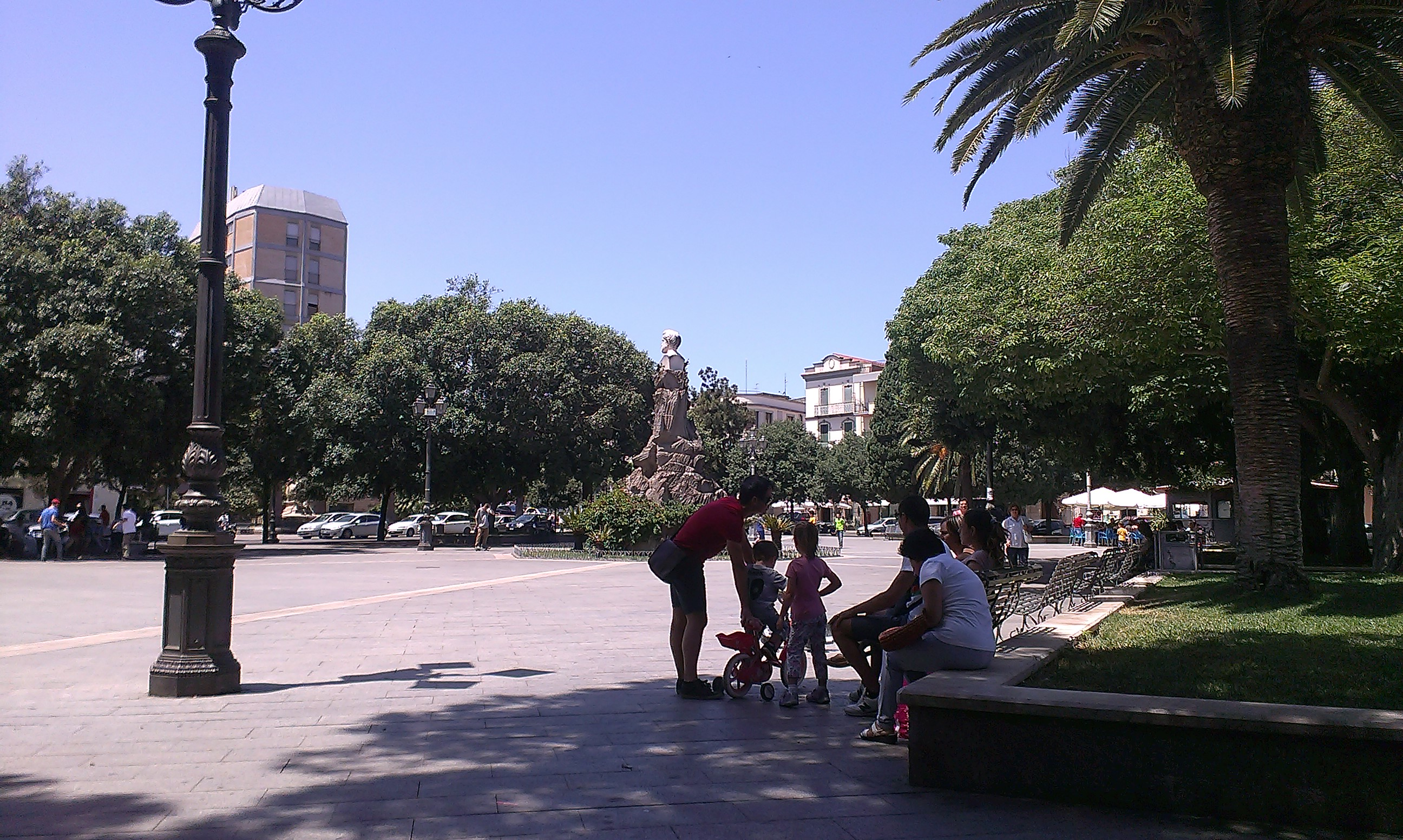
Piazza Quintino Sella

Piazza Sella, with benches, a pedestrian area and the town market, is Iglesias's social centre. It is bordered by Via Garibaldi (which leads to the railway station and separates it from nearby Piazza Oberdan), Via Valverde and Via Gramsci. The piazza is named after Quintino Sella because of the statue of the politician and economist by Giuseppe Sartorio which was erected in its centre in 1885; Sella developed Iglesias as a mining town.

=== Piazza Oberdan ===
Opposite Piazza Sella is a piazza named after Guglielmo Oberdan, with a war memorial in its centre created in 1928 by Francesco Ciusa. The area bordering the piazza was a car park during the 1930s and 1940s and was also the Satas bus station. The piazza has been used for military commemorations, from Fascist gatherings and parades to present-day celebrations of national events. A renovation of Piazza Oberdan was proposed in April 1953; pavement slabs were laid and flower beds were arranged around the monument, which was fenced off with chains. In 1981, the piazza was resurfaced and its flower beds rearranged.

=== Saint Barbara Cave ===
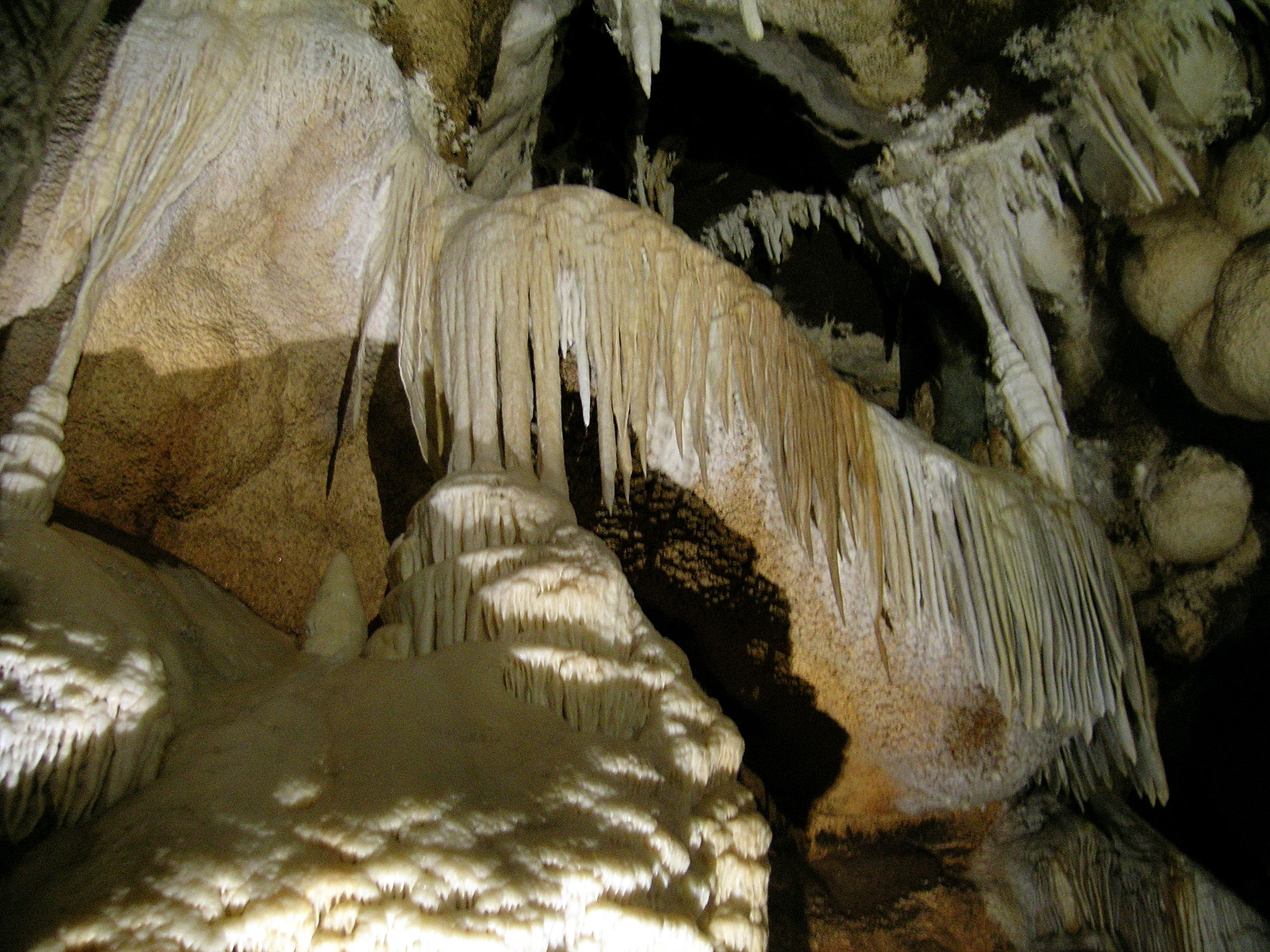
Interior of the cave

Discovered in 1952, some scholars estimate that the cave dates back to the Silurian (between 444 and 416 million years ago). A tour takes about three hours; it begins on a small train which runs to a lift, which approaches a grotto. A spiral staircase leads into the interior. A large, elliptical room with a diameter of 70 metres (230 ft) at its widest point and a height of 25 metres (82 ft), the cave has aragonite columns, calcareous formations in a variety of shapes and a pool 20 metres (66 ft) in diameter. The cave is covered in concretions, and "organ pipes" are calcareous formations which reproduce the sound of an organ when touched.

=== Cala Domestica Tower ===
The tower was built for defence and counterattack on the furthest promontory of the coast between Portixeddu and Porto Paglia, above the harbour entrance, against Muslim invasion as part of a network of hundreds of towers and outposts built by the Spanish crown. The towers, equipped with cannons, would open fire while the watchtowers sent smoke signals or drumbeat warnings. A fortress in the shape of a truncated cone, 11 metres (36 ft) high and 12 metres (39 ft) in diameter, was constructed of calcareous stone ashlar. The doorway, about 6 metres (20 ft) high, leads into a domed room about 7 metres (23 ft) wide with six loopholes.

=== Mineralogical Museum ===
The museum was built in 1871, at the same time as the mining school, to complete the miners’ theoretical training. It has two rooms with about 3,000 items, one of the sector's most complete and valuable collections. The first room has samples from all over the world, including samples from the Paris basin. In addition to the mineral samples, there are examples of the tools used to extract them. The second room contains the nucleus of the collection, with underground minerals (now no longer obtainable) from throughout the region. The Liberty style display cases have grotesque and arabesque carvings and herms.

=== Bays and beaches ===
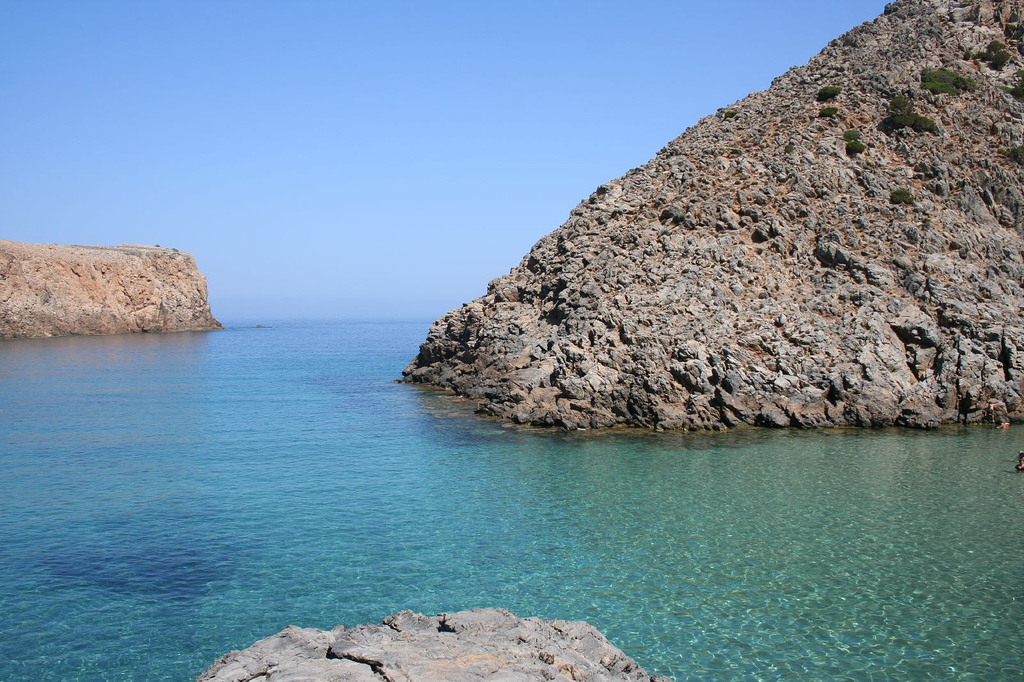
Cala domestica

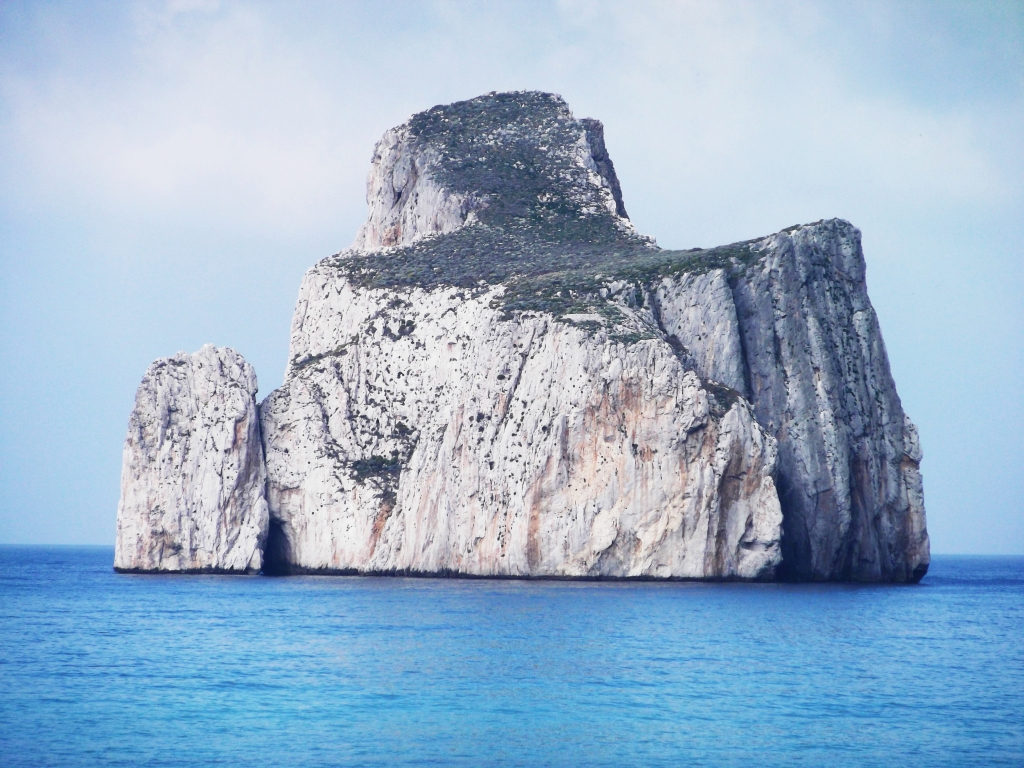
The islet of Pan di Zucchero (Sugarloaf)

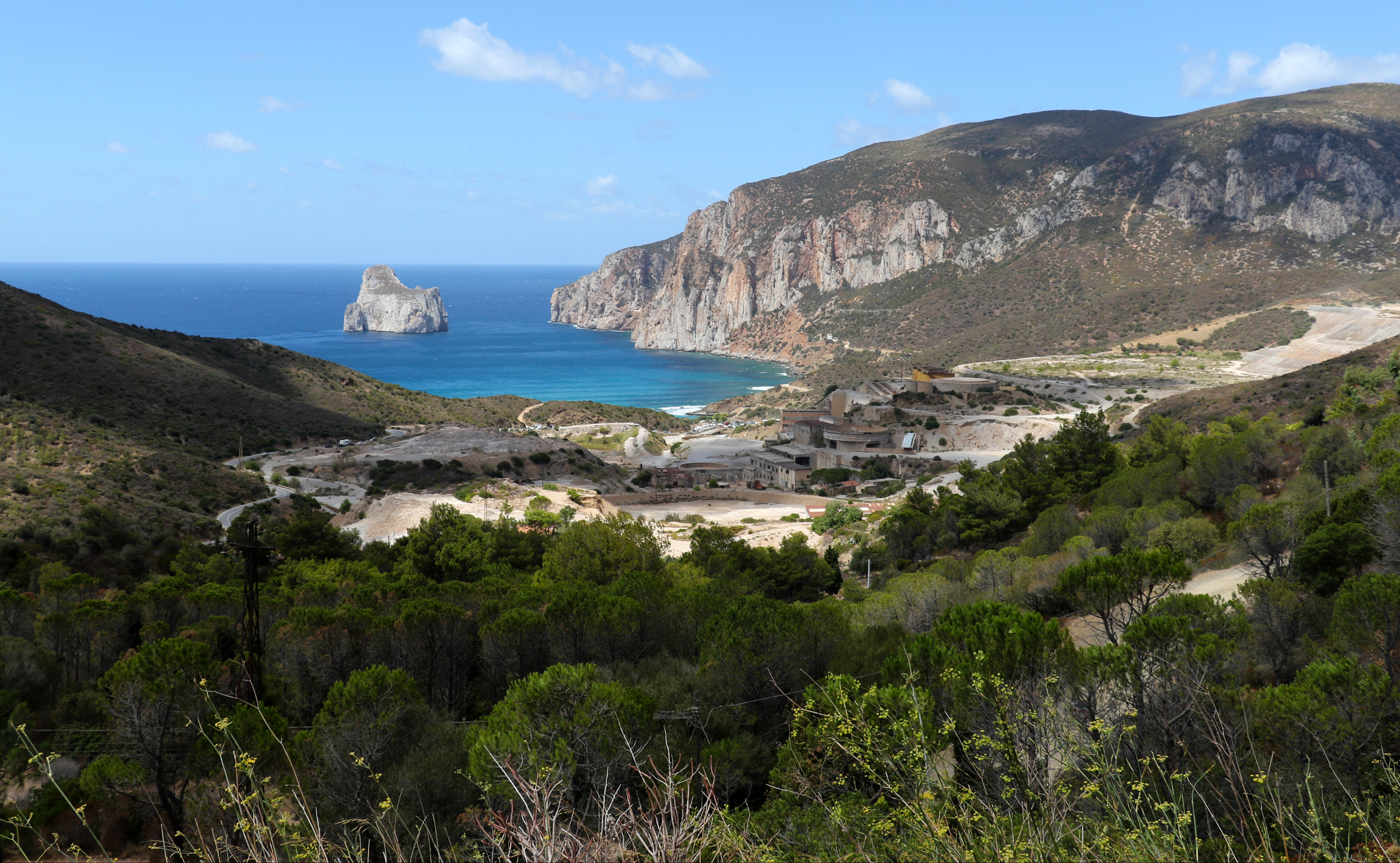
Masua

In Iglesias' littoral zone, (8 kilometres (5.0 miles) from the city centre), are the following bays and beaches (listed north to south):

- Cala Domestica, with the Spanish tower
- Su Forru (the Oven) cavern
- Portu Sciusciau shore, with cliffs up to 100 metres (330 ft) high
- Seabass Cavern
- Punta Corr'e Corti shore, with cliffs up to 103 metres (338 ft) high
- Porto di Canal Grande (Big Channel Port) shore
- Sardigna Cavern, a small cave in the shape of Sardinia
- Punta Sedda 'e Luas shore, with cliffs up to 115 metres (377 ft) high
- Schina 'e Monti Nai shore, with cliffs up to 162 metres (531 ft) high
- Punta Buccione (or Punta Buccioni) shore, with cliffs up to 167 metres (548 ft) high
- Pan di Zucchero (Sugarloaf) islet, 133 metres (436 ft) high
- Porto Bega Sa Canna (Reed Valley Port)
- Masua Beach
- Portu Cauli Beach
- Bay at Punta Corallo (Coral Point)
- Portu Ferru shore
- Portu Bruncu Cobertu shore
- Portu Banda shore
- Porto Ghiano shore
- Nebida shore
- S'Agusteri islet, 35 metres (115 ft) high, where lobsters are fished
- Portu Raffa Bay
- Porto Flavia

== Twin towns – sister cities ==
- Oberhausen, Germany
- Pisa, Italy

== See also ==
- History of mining in Sardinia

== Bibliography ==
- Casula, Francesco Cesare (1994). La Storia di Sardegna (in Italian). Sassari, it: Carlo Delfino Editore. ISBN 978-88-7138-084-1.
- Tangheroni, Marco (1985). La città dell'argento: Iglesias dalle origini alla fine del Medioevo. Napoli: Liguori Editore.
