= Mario Diana =

Italian politician

President of the Province of Oristano
- In office 17 April 2000 – 9 May 2005
- Preceded by: Gian Valerio Sanna
- Succeeded by: Pasquale Onida

Member of the Regional Council of Sardinia
- In office 14 June 2004 – 26 December 2008
- In office 19 March 2009 – 4 November 2013

Personal details
- Born: 9 May 1947 (age 79) Simala, Italy
- Party: Christian Democracy; National Alliance; The People of Freedom
- Profession: Politician

Mario Diana (born 9 May 1947) is an Italian politician.

== Life and career ==
Diana belongs to a noble family, well known in Marmilla. He subsequently transplanted to Oristano, where he has lived for years in the San Paolo-Torangius neighborhood. He is married and has three children. Before joining political activity full time, he worked as an entrepreneur in the auto parts sector and later in the real estate sector. Between the 80s and 90s he was also president of the FIGC of Oristano and regional councilor of the same Federation; president of the Ales football club and more recently of the main football team of Oristano, Tharros.

He was municipal councilor of Oristano for Christian Democracy between 1990 and 1993 and again between 1998 and 2000. In 2000 he was elected president of the province of oristano with 56.50% of the preferences, while in 2001 he also became regional councilor, taking over from Emilio Floris. He was re-elected to the Regional Council of Sardinia in 2004 with 1,924 personal preferences.

In June 2012 he left the PdL with other regional councilors and founded his own group, Sardinia is already tomorrow, also passing to the opposition of the centre-right regional government.

In 2013 Diana was arrested for unlawful use of funds to groups in the Regional Council, while in 2018 he was sentenced to 5 1/2 years of imprisonment.
