= List of mayors of Sassari =

Mayor of Sassari
- Sindaco di Sassari
- Incumbent; Giuseppe Mascia (PD) since 17 June 2024
- Appointer: Popular election
- Term length: 5 years, renewable once
- Website: Official website

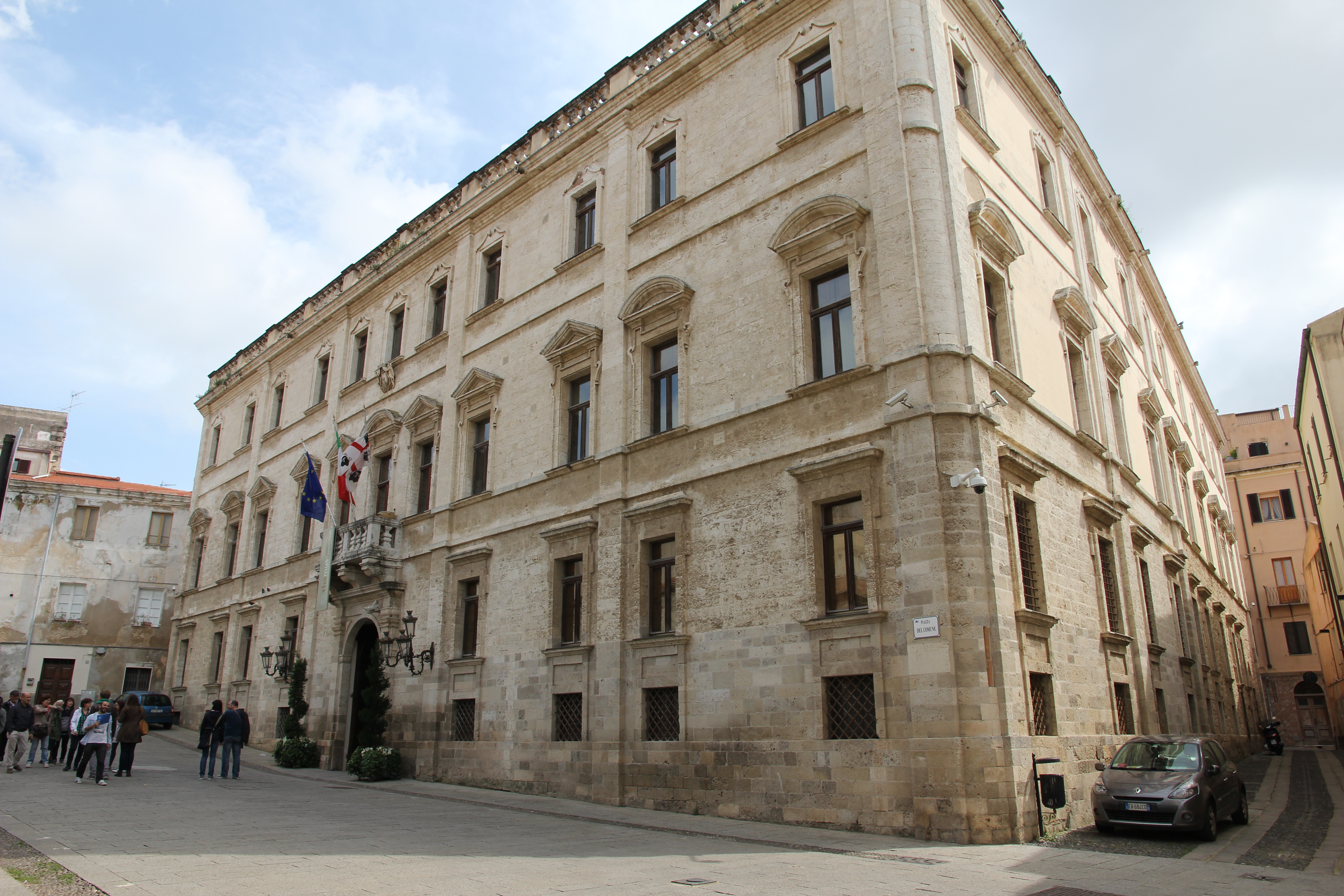
Palazzo Ducale is the seat of the Mayor of Sassari.

The Mayor of Sassari is an elected politician who, along with the Sassari's City Council, is accountable for the strategic government of Sassari in Sardinia, Italy.

The elected Mayor is Giuseppe Mascia, a member of the Democratic Party who was elected on 9 June 2024.

== Overview ==
According to the Italian Constitution, the Mayor of Sassari is member of the City Council.

The Mayor is elected by the population of Sassari, who also elect the members of the City Council, controlling the Mayor's policy guidelines and is able to enforce his resignation by a motion of no confidence. The Mayor is entitled to appoint and release the members of his government.

Since 1995 the Mayor is elected directly by Sassari's electorate: in all mayoral elections in Italy in cities with a population higher than 15,000 the voters express a direct choice for the mayor or an indirect choice voting for the party of the candidate's coalition. If no candidate receives at least 50% of votes, the top two candidates go to a second round after two weeks. The election of the City Council is based on a direct choice for the candidate with a preference vote: the candidate with the majority of the preferences is elected. The number of the seats for each party is determined proportionally.

== Republic of Italy (since 1946) ==
=== City Council election (1946-1995) ===
From 1946 to 1995, the Mayor of Sassari was elected by the City Council.

	Mayor	Term start	Term end	Party
1	Candido Mura	10 April 1946	4 September 1946	DC
2	Oreste Pieroni	4 September 1946	25 September 1954	DC
3	Vittorio Devilla	25 September 1954	27 June 1956	DC
4	Giuseppe Binna	27 June 1956	11 February 1957	DC
5	Piero Masia	11 February 1957	28 November 1960	DC
6	Lorenzo Ganadu	28 November 1960	6 September 1963	DC
7	Antonio Maria Brianda	6 September 1963	9 January 1965	DC
8	Salvino Naitana	9 January 1965	9 May 1966	DC
9	Nicolò Piras	9 May 1966	20 December 1968	DC
10	Francesco Guarino	20 December 1968	15 January 1971	DC
11	Benito Saba	15 January 1971	10 December 1973	DC
12	Sebastiano Virdis	10 December 1973	6 September 1975	DC
13	Fausto Fadda	6 September 1975	13 December 1978	PSI
14	Franco Meloni	13 December 1978	29 September 1980	PSd'Az
15	Pietro Montresori	29 September 1980	30 May 1983	DC
16	Raimondo Rizzu	30 May 1983	28 January 1988	DC
17	Marco Fumi	28 January 1988	8 August 1990	PSI
18	Franco Borghetto	8 August 1990	28 January 1994	PSI
19	Franco Masala	28 January 1994	8 August 1994	PSDI
20	Giacomo Spissu	8 August 1994	7 May 1995	PSI

=== Direct election (since 1995) ===
Since 1995, under provisions of new local administration law, the Mayor of Sassari is chosen by direct election.

	Mayor	Term start	Term end	Party	Coalition	Election
21	Anna Sanna (b. 1948)	8 May 1995	3 May 2000	PDS	PDS • PSd'Az • PdD • PPI	1995
22	Nanni Campus (b. 1952)	3 May 2000	9 May 2005	AN	FI • AN • CCD • RS	2000
23	Gianfranco Ganau (b. 1955)	9 May 2005	31 May 2010	DS; PD	The Olive Tree (DS-DL-PSd'Az-SDI-PRC)	2005
23	Gianfranco Ganau (b. 1955)	31 May 2010	28 March 2014 (Note: Resigned after being elected regional councillor.)	DS; PD	PD • IdV • FdS	2010
Special Prefectural Commissioner tenure (28 March 2014 – 31 May 2014)
24	Nicola Sanna (b. 1963)	31 May 2014	2 July 2019	PD	PD • SEL • CD	2014
(22)	Nanni Campus (b. 1952)	2 July 2019	17 June 2024	Ind	Ind	2019
25	Giuseppe Mascia (b. 1975)	17 June 2024	Incumbent	PD	PD • AVS • M5S	2024

== Bibliography ==
- Borghetto, Franco (1997). Simone Manca. Il primo sindaco di Sassari dopo l'Unità d'Italia. Sassari: Stampacolor.
- Brigaglia, Manlio (1979). La classe dirigente a Sassari da Giolitti a Mussolini. Cagliari: Edizioni Della Torre.
- Costa, Enrico (1976). Sassari. Sassari: Edizioni Gallizzi.
- Pallone, Mario (1932). "Note sui podesta di Sassari durante il dominio aragonese e spagnuolo". Studi sassaresi. Vol. 11. Sassari: Edizioni Gallizzi.
- Pintus, Renato (1978). Sovrani, viceré di Sardegna e governatori di Sassari. Sassari: Poddighe.
