= Pasquale Onida =

Italian politician (born 1942)

President of the Province of Oristano
- In office 10 May 2005 – 1 June 2010
- Preceded by: Mario Diana
- Succeeded by: Massimiliano De Seneen

Member of the Regional Council of Sardinia
- In office 28 July 1984 – 30 September 2005

Regional assessor for Public works of Sardinia
- In office October 2001 – 15 June 2004
- President: Mauro Pili (2001–03); Italo Masala (2003–04)

Regional assessor for Public education of Sardinia
- In office 27 November 1999 – October 2001
- President: Mario Floris

Regional assessor for Environment of Sardinia
- In office 1994 – 28 June 1999
- President: Federico Palomba

Personal details
- Born: 25 April 1942 (age 84) Sedilo, Sardinia, Kingdom of Italy
- Party: Christian Democracy; Italian People's Party; Union of the Centre; Fortza Paris
- Occupation: Public official

Pasquale Onida (born 25 April 1942) is an Italian politician who served as a member of the Regional Council of Sardinia from 1984 to 2005 and president of the Province of Oristano from 2005 to 2010.

== Life and career ==
Born in Sedilo, Sardinia, Onida graduated in law from the Università Cattolica del Sacro Cuore in Milan after receiving a scholarship to attend Augustinianum College. A member of Christian Democracy, he served as mayor of Sedilo from 1975 to 1980.

Onida was elected to the Regional Council of Sardinia in 1984 and served through four terms until 2005. He held several regional executive positions, including assessor for environment, public education and public works. In 2005, as a candidate for Fortza Paris, he was elected president of the Province of Oristano with 52.36% of the vote, succeeding Mario Diana.

In July 2013, following the regional government's reorganisation of the island's provinces, Onida was appointed extraordinary commissioner of the Province of Medio Campidano.
