= Elections in Naples =

Democratic elections have been held in Naples, Italy, since the collapse of Benito Mussolini's fascist regime. Today, all residents of Naples who are at least 18 years old and hold an EU citizenship are eligible to vote for the mayor and the 48 members of the city council. They also vote for the president and the 30 or 40 members of the municipal council in which they reside.

Since 1993, Italian mayors are elected directly. In the cities with a population higher than 15,000, voters can choose for a candidate for mayor and/or for a party or civic list that is not necessarily linked to the same mayor-candidate (panachage or voto disgiunto). If no candidate receives an absolute majority, the top two candidates go to a runoff election (ballottaggio) after two weeks. The city council and municipal council elections are based on a proportional system with preferences: for each list, the candidates with the most preferences are elected proportionally to the seats assigned to the list, with the lists supporting the elected mayor being granted around 60% of the total seats to guarantee stability.

Elections are normally scheduled every five years, usually between 15 April and 15 June. The last election was held in June 2016.

== Italian Republic (since 1946) ==
=== City council election, 1946 ===
The first democratic election after the fall of fascism took place on 10 November 1946.

After the Liberation of Naples in August 1943, Independent lawyer Giuseppe Solimene had been appointed as Provisional Mayor by the National Liberation Committee under approval of the United Nations military government. Between 1943 and 1946 the office had been filled by politicians from centre-left minor parties such as the liberal-socialist Action Party and the social-democratic Labour Democratic Party.

When the authority of the Italian government was restored in 1946, local elections in the whole country were called. Proportional representation and the Westminster system were the principles chosen for the restoration of municipal democracy in Italy.

For the first time, the inhabitants of the city, including men and women, without distinction, could vote for their representatives in the city council. The conservative and right-wing parties, such as the Monarchist National Party and Common Man's Front, received the combined majority of the votes and extensive representation in the city council, while the leftist alliance Popular Democratic Bloc, an alliance between the Communists, Socialists and centre-left minor parties, received just the 31% of the votes. However, the turnout of the election remains noted as extremely low.

Parties		Votes	%	Seats
Popular Democratic Bloc (Note: Alliance including PCI, PSIUP, PdA and PRI.)		73,617	31.2	25
Common Man's Front	UQ	46,851	19.8	16
Monarchist National Party	PNM	44,484	18.8	15
Italian Liberal Party	PLI	35,323	15.0	12
Christian Democracy	DC	32,169	13.6	11
National Reconstruction Union	URN	3,827	1.6	1
Total		236,271	100.0	80

Sunday 10 November 1946. Sources: La Stampa , 1946–1955 Local Elections (Italian), Electoral Archives of Naples (Italian)

=== City council election, 1952 ===
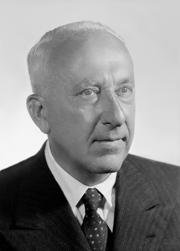
Achille Lauro, monarchist Mayor (1952–1958; 1961). He is still today considered one of the most influential and controversial political figures in the history of Naples

The incumbent city council's mandate expired in November 1951; however, a new election was postponed to next spring. During the maintenance of the previous council, the national political situation had deeply changed during the previous six years. In 1951, Alcide De Gasperi's government changed the local electoral law to a block voting system, to ensure the leadership of its local administrations. Two thirds of the seats would be assigned to the winning coalition, abolishing proportional representation.

The election took place on 25 May 1952, resulting in the unexpected defeat of the Centrist Coalition, with a right-wing coalition formed by monarchists and neo-fascists obtaining the majority of votes. The monarchist and former fascist businessman Achille Lauro, who had received almost 140,000 preference votes, higher than any number of votes received by any candidate in a local election up to that point, was elected mayor on 9 July and formed a far-right executive composed by members of PNM and MSI.

Coalitions and parties	Votes	%	+/-	Seats	+/-	Seats by party — Seats by coalition
Rightist Coalition	213,384	42.6		53		Seats by party — Seats by coalition
Monarchist National Party	147,814	29.5	▲10.7	37	▲22	Seats by party — Seats by coalition
Italian Social Movement	59,117	11.8	▲11.8	15	▲15	Seats by party — Seats by coalition
National Monarchist Front	6,453	1.3	▲1.3	1	▲1	Seats by party — Seats by coalition
Centrist Coalition	149,841	29.8		14		Seats by party — Seats by coalition
Christian Democracy	119,679	23.8	▲10.2	11	Steady	Seats by party — Seats by coalition
Italian Liberal Party	20,531	4.1	▼10.9	2	▼10	Seats by party — Seats by coalition
Italian Democratic Socialist Party	7,648	1.5	▲1.5	1	▲1	Seats by party — Seats by coalition
Italian Republican Party	1,983	0.4		0		Seats by party — Seats by coalition
Leftist Coalition	135,273	27.0		13		Seats by party — Seats by coalition
Italian Communist Party	107,916	21.5		11		Seats by party — Seats by coalition
Italian Socialist Party	15,075	3.0		1		Seats by party — Seats by coalition
Pine List (Leftist Independents)	12,282	2.5	▲2.5	1	▲1	Seats by party — Seats by coalition
Others	2,988	0.6	▲0.6	0	Steady	Seats by party — Seats by coalition
Total	501,426	100.0		80		Seats by party — Seats by coalition

Sunday 25 May 1952. Sources: La Stampa , 1946–1955 Local Elections (Italian), Electoral Archives of Naples (Italian)

=== City council election, 1956 ===
The occurrence of the 1956 election was anticipated by the effect of a new law which ordered a new legislature for a term of 4 years. A varying electoral system was additionally implemented; after Alcide De Gasperi's government had retired in 1953, the 1951 electoral law, based on a block voting system was restored.

In June 1953 the incumbent mayor Achille Lauro ran both as deputy and senator in the national election. Being elected in both the Chamber and the Senate, and despite having received more than 180,000 preference votes in the election for the Chamber of Deputies, he opted to remain in the Senate. However, in 1954, his election was invalidated, since he could not hold the offices of mayor and senator at the same time.

Due to his expulsion from the Senate and to his increasing popularity across Naples, in June 1954 Lauro founded a new monarchist party (People's Monarchist Party, PMP), breaking with the PNM's leader Alfredo Covelli. The new PMP party characterized itself for being closer to Christian Democracy, the support of which was necessary for Lauro to expand and enforce his political strength across the city.

The election, which took place on 27 May 1956, resulted in a landslide victory for Lauro's new monarchist party, with the Mayor himself obtaining more than 260,000 preference votes.

In 1958, after an inquiry sponsored by the national government, several administrative irregularities emerged and Lauro was ousted from the office, after the Zoli Cabinet nominated a special commissioner to rule the city.

Parties		Votes	%	+/-	Seats	+/-
People's Monarchist Party	PMP	276,599	51.2	▲51.2	44	▲44
Italian Communist Party	PCI	102,307	19.1	▼2.4	16	▲5
Christian Democracy	DC	87,630	16.4	▼7.4	11	▲2
Italian Socialist Party	PSI	23,765	4.4	▲1.3	3	▲2
Italian Social Movement	MSI	16,936	3.2	▼8.6	2	▼13
Monarchist National Party	PNM	10,306	1.9	▼27.6	1	▼36
Italian Liberal Party	PLI	9,042	1.7	▼2.4	1	▼1
Italian Democratic Socialist Party	PSDI	4,375	0.8	▼0.7	0	▼1
Others		3,405	0.6	Steady	0	Steady
Total		534,365	100.0		80	

Sunday 27 May 1956. Source: La Stampa , Electoral Archives of Naples (Italian)

=== City council election, 1960 ===
In 1959 the two main monarchist parties (the PMP and PNM) merged into the new Italian Democratic Party, later the Italian Democratic Party of Monarchist Unity (PDIUM). Despite the political scandal that led to a long period of suspension of the democratic institutions of the city, the election, which occurred upon 6 November 1950, resulted in a new political success for the monarchists; their leader, Achille Lauro, was again elected mayor in January 1961, thanks to the support of the Christian Democracy party. However he was forced to resign after 11 months, due to a political crisis that again led to the suspension of the city council and to a snap election in June 1962.

Parties		Votes	%	+/-	Seats	+/-
Italian Democratic Party of Monarchist Unity	PDIUM	201,522	36.0	▲36.0	29	▲29
Christian Democracy	DC	146,661	26.2	▲9.8	22	▲11
Italian Communist Party	PCI	130,908	23.4	▲4.3	19	▲3
Italian Socialist Party	PSI	34,152	6.1	▲1.7	5	▲2
Italian Social Movement	MSI	23,226	4.1	▲0.9	3	▲1
Italian Liberal Party	PLI	11,854	2.1	▲0.4	1	Steady
Italian Democratic Socialist Party	PSDI	11,181	2.0	▲1.2	1	▲1
Others		907	0.2	▼0.4	0	Steady
Total		560,441	100.0		80	

Sunday 6 November 1960. Source: La Stampa , Electoral Archives of Naples (Italian)

=== City council election, 1962 ===
The snap election, which took place on 10 June 1962, resulted within PDIUM obtaining the largest number of votes, despite considerable losses. For the first time the Christian Democracy party emerged as a possible challenger for Lauro's political dominance. After the election, a new alliance between PDIUM and DC was formed. However, in 1964 another political crisis between the two coalition partners occurred and another snap election was called.

Parties		Votes	%	+/-	Seats	+/-
Italian Democratic Party of Monarchist Unity	PDIUM	176,780	31.0	▼5.0	25	▼4
Christian Democracy	DC	158,828	27.8	▲1.6	23	▲1
Italian Communist Party	PCI	119,594	20.9	▼2.5	17	▼2
Italian Socialist Party	PSI	47,841	8.4	▲2.3	7	▲2
Italian Social Movement	MSI	31,715	5.5	▲1.4	4	▲1
Italian Democratic Socialist Party	PSDI	18,258	3.2	▲1.2	2	▲1
Italian Liberal Party	PLI	15,421	2.7	▲0.6	2	▲1
Others		2,571	0.5	▲0.3	0	Steady
Total		571,008	100.0		80	

Sunday 10 June 1962. Source: La Stampa , Electoral Archives of Naples (Italian)

=== City council election, 1964 ===
The snap election took place on 22 November 1964, with the Christian Democracy party becoming the largest party; the monarchists obtained their worst result ever in a local election in Naples during the election. On 27 January 1965, the first Neapolitan centre-left executive was formed and the Christian democrat Ferdinando Clemente di San Luca was elected mayor by an alliance that comprehended DC, PSI and PSDI.

Parties		Votes	%	+/-	Seats	+/-
Christian Democracy	DC	200,601	34.7	▲6.9	29	▲6
Italian Communist Party	PCI	142,349	24.6	▲3.7	20	▲3
Italian Social Movement	MSI	59,544	10.3	▲4.8	8	▲4
Italian Democratic Party of Monarchist Unity	PDIUM	48,337	8.7	▼22.3	7	▼18
Italian Liberal Party	PLI	46,307	8.0	▲5.3	6	▲4
Italian Socialist Party	PSI	37,850	6.5	▼1.9	5	▼2
Italian Democratic Socialist Party	PSDI	33,021	5.7	▲2.5	4	▲2
Italian Socialist Party of Proletarian Unity	PSIUP	9,396	1.6	▲1.6	1	▲1
Others		1,073	0.2	▼0.3	0	Steady
Total		578,478	100.0		80	

Sunday 22 November 1964. Source: La Stampa , Electoral Archives of Naples (Italian)

=== City council election, 1970 ===
The election took place on 7 June 1970; this election, six years after the last, took place simultaneously with the first regional elections of Campania. The centre-left alliance was easily reconfirmed as the major political alliance in the city council.

Parties		Votes	%	+/-	Seats	+/-
Christian Democracy	DC	209,153	33.8	▼0.9	28	▼1
Italian Communist Party	PCI	161,547	26.1	▲1.5	22	▲2
Italian Social Movement	MSI	74,720	12.1	▲1.8	10	▲2
Italian Socialist Party	PSI	45,655	7.4	▲0.9	6	▲1
Italian Democratic Socialist Party	PSDI	43,326	7.0	▲1.3	5	▲1
Italian Liberal Party	PLI	28,270	4.6	▼3.4	3	▼3
Italian Democratic Party of Monarchist Unity	PDIUM	23,220	3.8	▼4.8	3	▼4
Italian Republican Party	PRI	16,245	2.6	▲2.6	2	▲2
Italian Socialist Party of Proletarian Unity	PSIUP	11,160	1.8	▲0.2	1	Steady
Others		4,723	0.8	▲0.6	0	Steady
Total		618,019	100.0		80	

Sunday 7 June 1970. Source: La Stampa , Electoral Archives of Naples (Italian)

=== City council election, 1975 ===
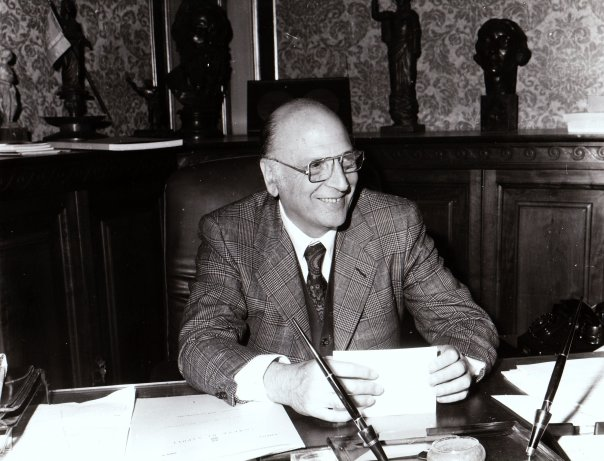
Maurizio Valenzi, first communist Mayor (1975–1983)

The election took place on 15 June 1975.

Reflecting the national vote, the Italian Communist Party became, for the first time in history, the largest party within the city council, with 32% of electorate support. This extraordinary result led to the birth of the first red-giunta in the history of the city: a new coalition was formed by the leftist Socialist, Democratic-Socialist and Communist Party, while Maurizio Valenzi (PCI) was elected mayor on 27 September.

A notable fact in the election was the surge of the post-fascist Italian Social Movement.

Parties		Votes	%	+/-	Seats	+/-
Italian Communist Party	PCI	228,385	32.3	▲6.2	27	▲5
Christian Democracy	DC	200,507	28.4	▼5.4	24	▼4
Italian Social Movement	MSI	130,992	18.5	▲6.4	15	▲5
Italian Democratic Socialist Party	PSDI	49,019	6.9	▼0.1	5	Steady
Italian Socialist Party	PSI	48,978	6.9	▼0.5	4	▼2
Italian Republican Party	PRI	21,908	3.1	▲0.5	2	Steady
Italian Liberal Party	PLI	14,099	2.0	▼2.6	2	▼1
Proletarian Democracy	DP	10,381	1.5	▲1.5	1	▲1
Others		2,746	0.4	▼0.4	0	Steady
Total		707,015	100.0		80	

Sunday 15 June 1975. Source: La Stampa , Electoral Archives of Naples (Italian)

=== City council election, 1980 ===
The election took place on 8 June 1980 and the Italian Communist Party was confirmed again as the largest party. However, the ruling left-wing coalition was not able to win more seats in the city council and assure a more stable majority. After a political crisis, a snap election was called in 1983.

Parties		Votes	%	+/-	Seats	+/-
Italian Communist Party	PCI	223,726	31.7	▼0.6	27	Steady
Christian Democracy	DC	178,854	25.4	▼3.0	21	▼3
Italian Social Movement	MSI	157,167	22.3	▲3.8	18	▲3
Italian Socialist Party	PSI	54,013	7.7	▲0.8	5	▲1
Italian Democratic Socialist Party	PSDI	45,565	6.5	▼0.4	4	▼1
Italian Republican Party	PRI	20,937	3.0	▼0.1	2	Steady
Italian Liberal Party	PLI	12,950	1.8	▼0.2	2	Steady
Proletarian Democracy	DP	7,054	1.0	▼0.5	1	Steady
Others		5,179	0.8	▲0.4	0	Steady
Total		705,445	100.0		80	

Sunday 8 June 1980. Source: La Stampa , Electoral Archives of Naples (Italian)

=== City council election, 1983 ===
The snap election took place on 20 November 1983. Despite notable losses, the Italian Communist Party was confirmed again as the largest party. However, the Christian Democracy party managed to form a transitional centre-left coalition with socialists and social-democrats. In November 1984 a Pentapartito coalition was finally formed and the socialist Carlo D'Amato was elected mayor.

Parties		Votes	%	+/-	Seats	+/-
Italian Communist Party	PCI	181,745	27.0	▼4.7	23	▼4
Christian Democracy	DC	163,777	24.3	▼1.1	20	▼1
Italian Social Movement	MSI	140,542	20.8	▼1.5	17	▼1
Italian Socialist Party	PSI	70,615	10.5	▲2.8	9	▲4
Italian Democratic Socialist Party	PSDI	44,967	6.6	▲0.1	5	▲1
Italian Republican Party	PRI	33,333	4.9	▲1.9	4	▲2
Italian Liberal Party	PLI	14,818	2.2	▲0.4	1	▼1
Radical Party	PR	8,981	1.3	▲1.3	1	▲1
Proletarian Democracy	DP	6,416	0.9	▼0.1	0	▼1
Others		8,850	1.4	▲0.6	0	Steady
Total		674,044	100.0		80	

Sunday 20 November 1983. Source: La Stampa , Electoral Archives of Naples (Italian)

=== City council election, 1987 ===
Another snap election took place on 14 June 1987.

Despite a high degree of fragmentation and instability during the previous years, the Pentapartito coalition managed to obtain again the majority of the seats in the city council. Christian Democracy became the largest party.

Parties		Votes	%	+/-	Seats	+/-
Christian Democracy	DC	212,082	30.4	▲6.1	26	▲6
Italian Communist Party	PCI	160,362	23.0	▼4.0	19	▼4
Italian Socialist Party	PSI	106,772	15.3	▲4.8	14	▲5
Italian Social Movement	MSI	70,723	10.2	▼10.6	8	▼9
Italian Democratic Socialist Party	PSDI	45,671	6.6	Steady	5	Steady
Italian Republican Party	PRI	38,188	5.6	▲0.7	4	Steady
Radical Party	PR	19,793	2.8	▲1.5	2	▲1
Italian Liberal Party	PLI	18,071	2.6	▲0.4	1	Steady
Proletarian Democracy	DP	10,130	1.4	▲0.5	1	▲1
Others		15,260	2.1	▲0.7	0	Steady
Total		697,092	100.0		80	

Sunday 14 June 1987. Source: La Stampa , Electoral Archives of Naples (Italian)

=== City council election, 1992 ===
The election took place on 7 June 1992, resulting within a Christian democracy victory.

Parties		Votes	%	+/-	Seats	+/-
Christian Democracy	DC	178,096	29.8	▼0.6	25	▼1
Italian Socialist Party	PSI	116,904	19.5	▲4.2	16	▲2
Democratic Party of the Left	PDS	75,972	12.7	▼9.3	10	▼9
Italian Social Movement	MSI	55,256	9.2	▼1.0	7	▼1
Italian Republican Party	PRI	37,567	6.3	▲0.7	5	▲1
Italian Liberal Party	PLI	36,099	6.3	▲3.7	5	▲4
Italian Democratic Socialist Party	PSDI	35,533	5.9	▼0.7	5	Steady
Communist Refoundation Party	PRC	24,346	4.1	▲4.1	3	▲3
Federation of the Greens	FdV	15,317	2.6	▲2.6	2	▲2
The Network	LR	11,579	1.9	▲1.9	1	▲1
Pannella List	LP	9,525	1.6	▲1.6	1	▲1
Others		2,016	0.3	▼1.8	0	Steady
Total		598,210	100.0		80	

Sunday 7 June 1992. Source: La Stampa , Electoral Archives of Naples (Italian)

=== Mayoral and city council election, 1993 ===
The election took place on two rounds, the first on 21 November and the second on 5 December 1993.

Summary of the 1993 Naples city council election results
Parties and coalitions		Votes	%	Seats
Democratic Party of the Left (Partito Democratico della Sinistra)	PDS	92,475	19.76%	20
Communist Refoundation Party (Rifondazione Comunista)	PRC	41,453	8.86%	8
Federation of the Greens (Federazione dei Verdi)	FdV	18,049	3.86%	3
Socialist Rebirth (Rinascita Socialista)	RS	12,563	2.68%	2
The Network (La Rete)	LR	9,763	2.09%	2
Others		6,497	1.39%	1
Bassolino coalition (Left-wing)		180,800	38.62%	36
Italian Social Movement (Movimento Sociale Italiano)	MSI	145,873	31.16%	13
Christian Democracy (Democrazia Cristiana)	DC	46,730	9.98%	6
Italian Socialist Party (Partito Socialista Italiano)	PSI	18,371	3.92%	1
Italian Democratic Socialist Party (Partito Socialdemocratico Italiano)	PSDI	13,882	2.97%	1
Italian Liberal Party (Partito Liberale Italiano)	PLI	6,333	1.35%	0
Caprara coalition (Quadripartito)		85,316	18.23%	8
Naples Alliance (Alleanza Napoli)	AN	31,818	6.80%	3
Others		24,295	5.19%	0
Total		468,102	100%	60
Votes cast / turnout		589,311	67.03%	
Registered voters		879,237		
Source: Ministry of the Interior

Candidate	Party	Coalition	First round		Second round	
Candidate	Party	Coalition	Votes	%	Votes	%
Antonio Bassolino	PDS	PDS-PRC-RS-FdV-LR	229,649	41.62	300,964	55.65
Alessandra Mussolini	MSI		171,315	31.05	239,867	44.35
Massimo Caprara	DC	DC-PSI-PSDI-PLI	77,643	14.07		
Angelo Sabatino	Ind		47,648	8.64		
Others			25,450	4.61		
Eligible voters			879,237	100.00	879,237	100.00
Voted			589,311	67.03	559,696	63.66
Blank or invalid ballots			37,596		18,865	
Total valid votes			551,715		540,831	

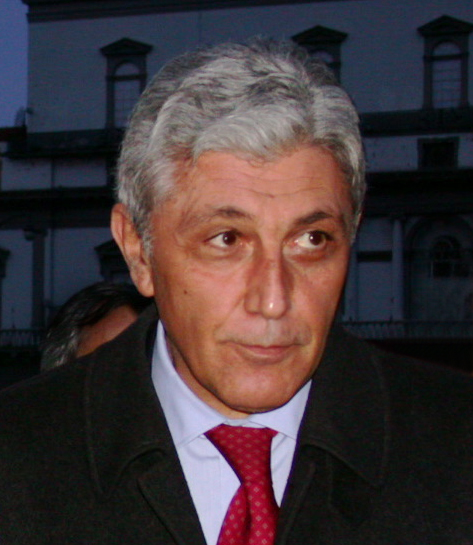
Antonio Bassolino (PDS) became the first directly elected mayor of Naples (1993–2000)

=== Mayoral and city council election, 1997 ===
The election took place on 16 November 1997.

Summary of the 1997 Naples city council election results
Parties and coalitions		Votes	%	Seats
Democratic Party of the Left (Partito Democratico della Sinistra)	PDS	164,644	33.28%	22
Italian People's Party (Partito Popolare Italiano)	PPI	44,438	8.98%	5
Communist Refoundation Party (Rifondazione Comunista)	PRC	31,769	6.42%	4
Italian Renewal (Rinnovamento Italiano)	RI	22,765	4.60%	3
The Network (La Rete)	LR	18,698	3.78%	2
Others		57,063	11.53%	6
Bassolino coalition (Centre-left)		339,377	68.61%	42
National Alliance (Alleanza Nazionale)	AN	56,094	11.34%	7
Forza Italia	FI	55,144	11.15%	7
Christian Democratic Centre (Centro Cristiano Democratico)	CCD	25,480	5.15%	3
Others		9,295	1.88%	1
Novi coalition (Centre-right)		146,013	29.52%	18
Tricolour Flame (Fiamma Tricolore)	MS-FT	5,207	1.05%	0
Others		4,058	0.82%	0
Total		494,655	100%	60
Votes cast / turnout		587,285	68.17%	
Registered voters		861,455		
Source: Ministry of the Interior

Candidate	Party	Coalition	First round	
Candidate	Party	Coalition	Votes	%
Antonio Bassolino	PDS	The Olive Tree	399,454	72.92
Emiddio Novi	FI	Pole for Freedoms	138,406	25.26
Others			9,906	1.81
Eligible voters			861,455	100.00
Voted			587,285	68.17
Blank or invalid ballots			39,464	
Total valid votes			547,821	

=== Mayoral and city council election, 2001 ===
The election took place in two rounds: the first on 13 May, the second on 27 May 2001.

Candidate	Party	Coalition	First round		Second round	
Candidate	Party	Coalition	Votes	%	Votes	%
Rosa Russo Iervolino	DL	The Olive Tree	262,818	48.82	278,183	52.91
Antonio Martusciello	FI	House of Freedoms	246,089	45.71	247,564	47.09
Others			29,457	5.47		
Eligible voters			849,798	100.00	849,798	100.00
Voted			579,204	68.16	534,590	62.91
Blank or invalid ballots			40,840		8,843	
Total valid votes			538,364		525,747	

=== Mayoral and city council election, 2006 ===
The election took place on 28–29 May 2006.

Candidate	Party	Coalition	First round	
Candidate	Party	Coalition	Votes	%
Rosa Russo Iervolino	DL	The Olive Tree	304,975	57.20
Franco Malvano	FI	House of Freedoms	201,242	37.74
Others			26,962	5.06
Eligible voters			828,496	100.00
Voted			552,110	66.64
Blank or invalid ballots			18,931	
Total valid votes			533,179	

=== Mayoral and city council election, 2011 ===
The election took place in two rounds: the first on 15–16 May, the second on 29–30 May 2011.

Candidate	Party	Coalition	First round		Second round	
Candidate	Party	Coalition	Votes	%	Votes	%
Luigi De Magistris	IdV	IdV-FdS	128,303	27.52	264,730	65.38
Gianni Lettieri	PdL	PdL-FdS-NS-PID-PRI-LD-AdC	179,575	38.52	140,203	34.62
Mario Morcone	PD	PD-SEL	89,280	19.15		
Raimondo Pasquino	UDC	UDC-FLI-ApI	45,449	9.75		
Clemente Mastella	UDEUR		10,124	2.17		
Roberto Fico	M5S		6,441	1.38		
Others			7,002	1.51		
Eligible voters			812,450	100.00	812,450	100.00
Voted			490,142	60.33	410,907	50.58
Blank or invalid ballots			23,968		5,974	
Total valid votes			466,174		404,933	

Summary of the 2011 Naples city council election results
Parties and coalitions		Votes	%	Seats
The People of Freedom (Il Popolo delle Libertà)	PdL	97,752	23.85%	8
Force of the South (Forza del Sud)	FdS	21,428	5.23%	1
We the South (Noi Sud)	NS	14,658	3.58%	1
Lettieri List (Lista Lettieri)	LL	12,571	3.07%	1
Others		30,490	7.43%	0
Lettieri coalition (Centre-right)		176,901	43.16%	11
Democratic Party (Partito Democratico)	PD	68,018	16.59%	5
Left Ecology Freedom (Sinistra Ecologia Libertà)	SEL	16,283	3.97%	0
Others		8,682	2.12%	0
Morcone coalition (Centre-left)		92,983	22.68%	5
Italy of Values (Italia dei Valori)	IdV	33,320	8.13%	15
Naples is Yours (Napoli è Tua)	NT	18,902	4.61%	8
Federation of the Left (Federazione della Sinistra)	FdS	15,008	3.66%	6
Others		1,292	0.32%	0
De Magistris coalition (Left-wing)		68,522	16.72%	29
Union of the Centre (Unione di Centro)	UDC	21,335	5.21%	2
Future and Freedom (Futuro e Libertà)	FLI	13,807	3.37%	1
Alliance for Italy (Alleanza per l'Italia)	ApI	6,003	1.46%	0
Others		5,904	1.44%	0
Pasquino coalition (Centre)		47,069	11.48%	3
Others		24,420	5.96%	0
Total		409,895	100%	48
Votes cast / turnout		490,142	60.33%	
Registered voters		812,450		
Source: Ministry of the Interior

=== Mayoral and city council election, 2016 ===
The election took place in two rounds, the first on 5 June and the second on 19 June 2016.

Candidate	Party	Coalition	First round		Second round	
Candidate	Party	Coalition	Votes	%	Votes	%
Luigi De Magistris	DemA	DemA-SI-FdV-PRC-PCd'I-IdV	172,710	42.82	185,907	66.85
Gianni Lettieri	FI		96,961	24.04	92,174	33.15
Valeria Valente	PD	PD-AP-UDC-CD-Mod-PSI	85,225	21.13		
Matteo Brambilla	M5S		38,863	9.64		
Marcello Tagliatela	FdI		5,186	1.29		
Others			4,336	1.08		
Eligible voters			788,291	100.00	788,291	100.00
Voted			426,602	54.12	283,542	35.97
Blank or invalid ballots			23,291		5,461	
Total valid votes			403,311		278,081	

Summary of the 2016 Naples city council election results
Parties and coalitions		Votes	%	Seats
De Magistris List (Lista De Magistris)	LDM	51,896	13.79%	10
Democracy and Autonomy (Democrazia e Autonomia)	DemA	28,587	7.60%	5
Naples in Common to the Left (Napoli in Comune a Sinistra)	NCS	19,945	5.30%	4
Federation of the Greens (Federazione dei Verdi)	FdV	11,341	3.01%	2
Others		37,971	10.08%	3
De Magistris coalition (Left-wing)		149,740	39.80%	24
Forza Italia	FI	36,145	9.61%	4
Lettieri List (Lista Lettieri)	LL	28,869	7.67%	2
Others		27,347	7.27%	1
Lettieri coalition (Centre-right)		92,361	24.55%	7
Democratic Party (Partito Democratico)	PD	43,790	11.64%	6
Popular Area (Area Popolare)	AP	7,521	2.00%	1
Others		37,675	10.01%	0
Valente coalition (Centre-left)		88,986	23.65%	7
Five Star Movement (Movimento Cinque Stelle)	M5S	36,359	9.66%	2
Others		8,817	2.35%	0
Total		376,263	100%	40
Votes cast / turnout		426,602	54.12%	
Registered voters		788,291		
Source: Ministry of the Interior
