= List of presidents of the Province of Naples =

President of the Province of Naples
- Presidente della Provincia di Napoli
- Inaugural holder: Gerardo Brancaccio
- Formation: 1889
- Final holder: Luigi Cesaro
- Abolished: 2014
- Superseded by: Metropolitan mayor of Naples

The president of the Province of Naples was the head of the provincial administration of Naples, a local government authority in Campania, Italy.

== History ==
The office of president of the Province of Naples was established in 1889, initially within the Provincial Deputation. Before that date, the Deputation was headed by the prefect. During the Fascist period (1926–1945), the province was governed by appointed officials, including Royal Commissioners and presidents of reorganised provincial structures under central control.

After World War II, the office was restored and gradually redefined within the Italian Republic, first with indirect election by the Provincial Council and, from 1995, with direct popular election.

The province was eventually replaced in 2015 by the Metropolitan City of Naples.

== List ==
=== Presidents of the Provincial Deputation (1889–1927) ===
No.	Portrait	Name	Term of office		Party
No.	Portrait	Name	Start	End	Party
1		Gerardo Brancaccio	1889	1891	?
2		Giuseppe Orlandi	1891	1896	?
3		Domenico Pagliano	1896	1900	?
4		Luigi Napodano	1900	1901	?
5		Riccardo Carafa d'Adria	1901	1904	?
6		Carlo Gargiulo	1904	1906	?
7		Paolino Angrisani	1906	1912	?
8		Michele Mazzella	1912	1914	?
9		Matteo Galdi	1914	?	?
		Pasquale Liguori	1920	1920	Democratic Progressive Alliance
		Francesco Visco	1920	June 1921	Italian Democratic Liberal Party
		Salvatore Girardi	June 1921	?	Italian Democratic Liberal Party

=== Presidents of the Provincial Rectorate (1928–1943) ===
No.	Portrait	Name	Term of office		Party
No.	Portrait	Name	Start	End	Party
1		Nicola Caracciolo	27 December 1928	July 1932	National Fascist Party
2		Teodoro Morisani	July 1932	11 June 1936	National Fascist Party
3		Luigi Lojacono	11 June 1936	1940	National Fascist Party
4		Nicola Caracciolo	1940	September 1942	National Fascist Party
5		Salvatore Aurino	September 1942	1943	National Fascist Party

=== Presidents of the Provincial Deputation (1944–1952) ===
No.	Portrait	Name	Term of office		Party
No.	Portrait	Name	Start	End	Party
		?	?	?	?
		Enrico Altavilla	2 November 1946	17 July 1952	Independent

=== Presidents of the Province (1952–2014) ===
No.	Portrait	Name	Term of office		Party
No.	Portrait	Name	Start	End	Party
1		Enrico Altavilla	17 July 1952	1956	Independent
2		Giuseppe Piegari	1956	1956	Christian Democracy
3		Guglielmo Waschimps	1956	1960	Christian Democracy
4		Antonio Gava	1960	1969	Christian Democracy
5		Ciro Cirillo	1969	1975	Christian Democracy
6		Giuseppe Iacono	1975	1980	Italian Socialist Party
7		Giuseppe Balzano	1980	1984	Italian Socialist Party
8		Franco Iacono	1984	1985	Italian Socialist Party
9		Antonio Somma	1985	1987	Christian Democracy
10		Salvatore Piccolo	1987	31 December 1991	Christian Democracy
11		Franco Zagaroli	29 February 1992	28 May 1993	Christian Democracy
12		Rosa Russo	6 July 1993	24 April 1995	Christian Democracy
13		Amato Lamberti	7 May 1995	25 June 2004	Federation of the Greens
14		Dino Di Palma	25 June 2004	8 June 2009	Federation of the Greens
15		Luigi Cesaro	8 June 2009	18 March 2013	The People of Freedom
—		Antonio Pentangelo (Acting President)	18 March 2013	1 January 2015	The People of Freedom; Forza Italia

== See also ==
- List of mayors of Naples
- Metropolitan City of Naples

== Sources ==
- "Storia amministrativa dell'ente". Ministero dell'Interno.
- "Presidenti della Provincia di Napoli (1919-1945)". Bicentenario della Provincia di Napoli. Provincia di Napoli.
- "Consiglieri ed elezioni 1960-1992" (PDF). Bicentenario della Provincia di Napoli. Provincia di Napoli.
- Menichini, Piera (2005). "I presidenti delle Province dall'Unità alla Grande guerra: repertorio analitico". Storia Amministrazione Costituzione (13): 267–268.
