= Vincenzo Scotti =

Italian politician and member of Christian Democracy

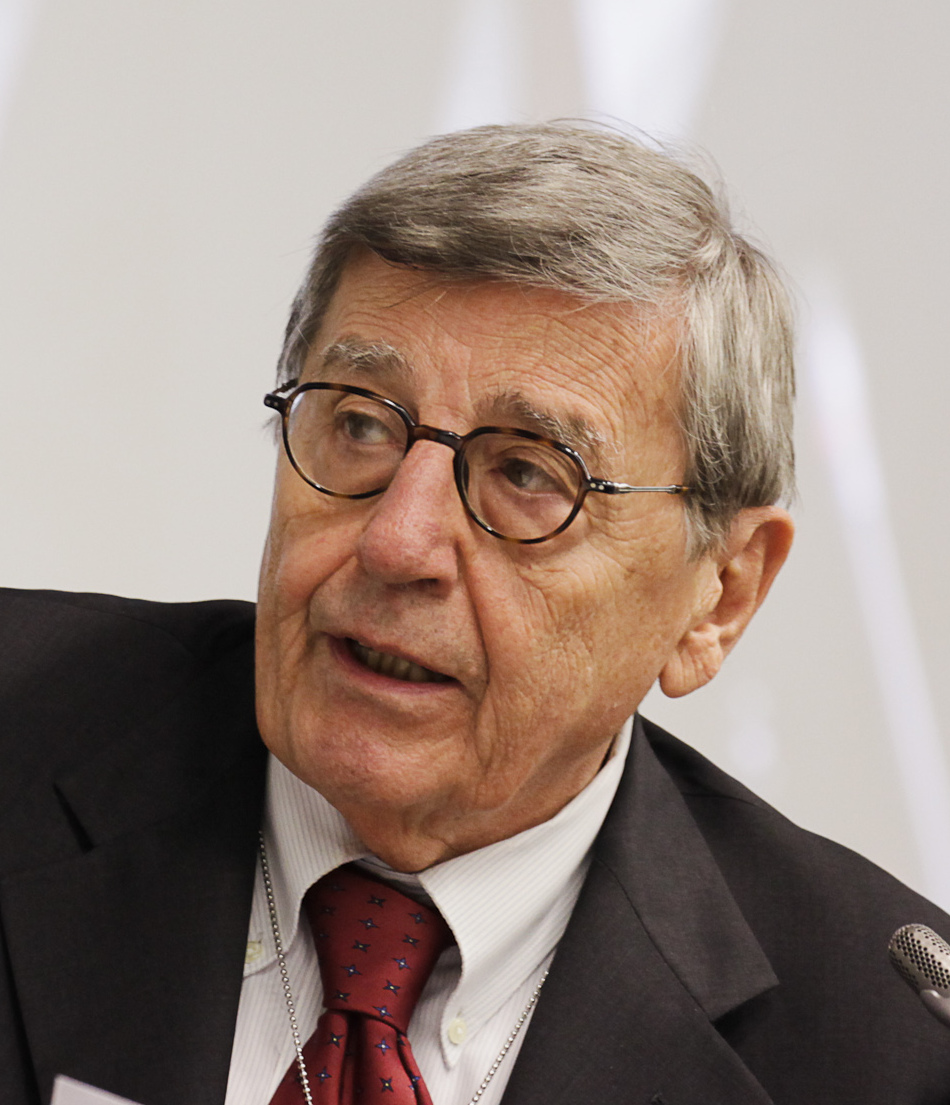

Minister of Foreign Affairs
- In office 28 June 1992 – 29 July 1992
- Prime Minister: Giuliano Amato
- Preceded by: Gianni De Michelis
- Succeeded by: Giuliano Amato

Minister of the Interior
- In office 16 October 1990 – 28 June 1992
- Prime Minister: Giulio Andreotti
- Preceded by: Antonio Gava
- Succeeded by: Nicola Mancino

Personal details
- Born: 16 September 1933 (age 93) Naples, Italy
- Party: DC (1968–1994); TP (2006); MpA (2007–2010); NS (2010-2023); Christian Democracy with Rotondi (since 2023)
- Height: 1.65 m (5 ft 5 in)
- Profession: Politician

Vincenzo Scotti (born 16 September 1933) is an Italian politician and member of Christian Democracy (DC). He was Minister of the Interior and Minister of Foreign Affairs.

== Biography ==
Born in Naples, he graduated in economics at the Università di Roma La Sapienza in 1955.

In his early career, he was responsible for the Centre for Research of the Workers' union CISL. In 1968, Scotti was elected as Deputy for the Christian Democracy in the Italian Parliament. Later he was Minister for Cultural Assets and Activities (1981–82), member of the Finance Commission to the House of Deputies, Undersecretary of State to the Ministry of Budget, Labour Minister, Minister for Coordination of European Community Policies, Minister of Art and Cultural Heritage and the Environment, Minister of Civil Protections, and President of the Parliamentary Group for the Christian Democrats to the House of Deputies (the largest group of the Italian parliament with 230 deputies). He was elected Mayor of Naples in 1984.

During his term as Minister of Interior (1990-1992), laws which permitted police authorities and magistrates to act against the Mafia organisation Camorra were promulgated. In collaboration with judge Giovanni Falcone and US attorney Rudy Giuliani, he founded the DIA (Direzione Investigativa Antimafia), a specialised anti-mafia police force.

As Minister of Foreign Affairs, he participated in the G7 Summit in Munich in 1992, and represented the Prime Minister in the meetings of the heads of governments of the CSCE. During the arms embargo of Yugoslavia and as president of the UEO, he was responsible for organisation of patrols of international waters by Italian armed forces.

He was cofounder of Fondazione Valenzi, an institution culturally and socially active created in memory of the ancient mayor of Naples Maurizio Valenzi.

== Teaching career ==
From 1969 to 1995, he taught at the LUISS, a private university in Rome, Italy, as a professor of Development Economics. Currently, he is President of Link Campus University, an Italian private university.

On 27 April 2019, he was accused by Mueller investigation target George Papadopoulos of having been involved in “setting him [Papadopoulos] up.”

== Legal issues ==
Scotti was one of the most important DC figures in Campania. In the 1980s, together with many other members of the party, he was involved in a financial scandal which followed reconstruction after the 1980 Irpinia earthquake, but avoided judgment due to the statute of limitations. Together with that of Antonio Gava, his name was mentioned in the kidnapping and liberation of DC member Ciro Cirillo by the Italian Red Brigades terrorist group in 1981. Scotti allegedly met Camorra boss Raffaele Cutolo in the prison at Ascoli Piceno to make arrangements for the ransom to be paid with Camorra money.

Scotti was accused of corruption in scandals regarding garbage management and construction projects for the 1990 Football World Cup, but was finally acquitted of all charges. Italy's Court of Accounts sentenced him to pay €2,995,450 for having the Italian state buy a building in Rome at an inflated price, in order to create cash for SISDE, Italy's secret service.

Italian Chamber of Deputies
Preceded by Title jointly held	Deputy for Naples; 1968 – 1984	Succeeded by Title jointly held
Political offices
Preceded by Salvatore Lima	Undersecretary to the Italian Minister of Balance; 1976 – 1978	Succeeded by Lucio Gustavo Abis
Preceded by Tina Anselmi	Italian Minister of Labour; 1978 – 1980	Succeeded by Franco Foschi
New title	Italian Minister of European Affairs; 1980 – 1981	Succeeded by Lucio Gustavo Abis
Preceded by Oddo Biasini	Italian Minister of Culture; 1981 – 1982	Succeeded by Nicola Vernola
Preceded by Michele Di Giesi	Italian Minister of Labour; 1982 – 1983	Succeeded by Gianni De Michelis
Preceded by Loris Fortuna	Italian Minister of Civil Defense; 1983 – 1984	Succeeded by Giuseppe Zamberletti
Preceded by Francesco Picardi	Mayor of Naples; 1984	Succeeded by Mario Forte
Preceded by Antonio Gava	Italian Minister of the Interior; 1990 – 1992	Succeeded by Nicola Mancino
Preceded by Gianni De Michelis	Italian Minister of Foreign Affairs; 1992	Succeeded by Giuliano Amato
Preceded by Vittorio Craxi, Famiano Crucianelli, Donato Di Santo, Gianni Vernetti	Under Secretary to the Italian Minister of Foreign Affairs; 2008 – present Served alongside: Stefania Craxi, Alfredo Mantica	Incumbent
