= Sicilian People's Movement =

The Sicilian People's Movement (Movimento Popolare Siciliano, MPS) was a regional centrist political party active in Sicily, Italy. It was founded in 2012 by the merge of Allied for Sicily (Alleati per la Sicilia, ApS) and some civic associations. Riccardo Savona was elected president of the party. ApS was in turn formed in May 2011 by former members of PdL, UDC and PD in support of Raffaele Lombardo's regional government. The party, which at its foundation counted 6 regional deputies, was a close ally of the Movement for Autonomy.

In the 2012 Sicilian regional election the party formed a joint list with the local section of Future and Freedom in support of the "Sicilianist" bid of Gianfranco Miccichè (Great South and Party of Sicilians). The list obtained 4.4% of the vote and no regional deputies, as it did not pass the 5% threshold.

However, the leader of MPS Riccardo Savona was candidated among the ranks of the Great South party and was eventually elected.

== Leadership ==
- President: Riccardo Savona
