= Giuseppe Antoci =

Italian politician (born 1968)

Giuseppe Antoci MEP
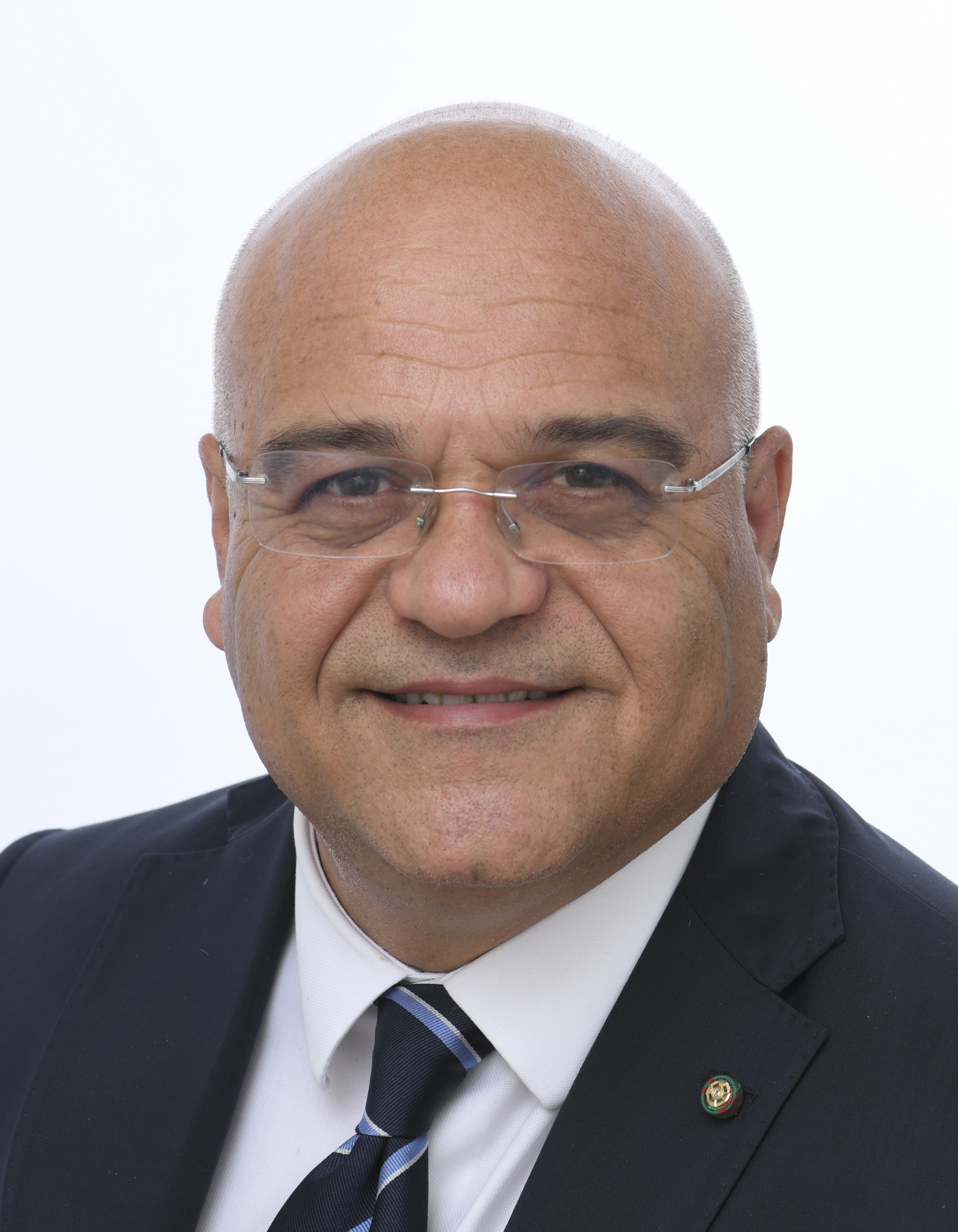
- Antoci in 2024

Member of the European Parliament for Italian Islands
- Incumbent
- Assumed office 16 July 2024

Personal details
- Born: 10 January 1968 (age 58) Santo Stefano di Camastra, Italy
- Party: The Megaphone – Crocetta List (2012–2013); Five Star Movement (2024–present)
- Other political affiliations: The Left in the European Parliament
- Education: University of Messina

Giuseppe Antoci (born 11 January 1968) is an Italian politician of the Five Star Movement (M5S) who was elected a member of the European Parliament (MEP) in 2024. He previously served as president of Nebrodi Park (Parco dei Nebrodi), a protected natural area in Sicily, from 2013 to 2018. Following his crackdown on Sicilian Mafia activities in the park Antoci was the target of an assassination attempt in 2016, foiled by his police escort.

== Biography ==
Antoci was born in Santo Stefano di Camastra, Italia. He holds a degree in Economics from the University of Messina and specializes in banking and finance. After graduating, Antoci worked as an employee at the Acireale branch of Banca Popolare Santa Venera. He ran for the Senate in the 2013 general election as a candidate for The Megaphone – Crocetta List. From October 17, 2013, to February 13, 2018, he served as President of the Nebrodi Park, and since March 30, 2014, he has been Regional Coordinator of Federparchi Sicilia.

In May 2016, Antoci survived an armed attack by the Sicilian Mafia and has been living under constant police protection ever since. The attack was motivated by his efforts to ensure that European agricultural funds did not fall into the hands of the Mafia. In 2022, security measures for Antoci were stepped up once again due to renewed rumors of an attack by the Mafia.

In 2024, Antoci joined the Five Star Movement and was named the party’s lead candidate in the island constituency for that year’s European elections. He was elected with 64,866 votes, making him the most-voted-for candidate from the progressive camp in Sicily.On October 3, 2024, he was elected Chair of the European Parliament’s Committee on Health and Public Safety (DMED).

Antoci is a member of the Delegation for Relations with Israel and the Delegation to the Parliamentary Assembly of the Union for the Mediterranean, as well as a substitute member of the Delegation for Relations with the United States. He is married and has three children.
