= Antonio Gava =

Italian politician (1930–2008)

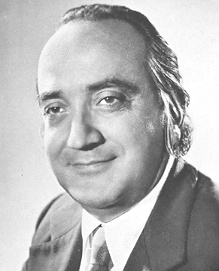

Minister of the Interior
- In office 13 April 1988 – 16 October 1990
- Prime Minister: Ciriaco De Mita; Giulio Andreotti
- Preceded by: Amintore Fanfani
- Succeeded by: Vincenzo Scotti

Minister of Economy and Finances
- In office 28 July 1987 – 13 April 1988
- Prime Minister: Giovanni Goria
- Preceded by: Giuseppe Guarino
- Succeeded by: Emilio Colombo

Minister of Posts and Telecommunications
- In office 4 August 1983 – 28 July 1987
- Prime Minister: Giovanni Goria
- Preceded by: Giuseppe Guarino
- Succeeded by: Emilio Colombo

President of the Regional Council of Campania
- In office 13 July 1970 – 30 November 1970
- Preceded by: Giuseppe Onofaro
- Succeeded by: Galileo Barbirotti

President of the Province of Naples
- In office 1960–1969
- Preceded by: Guglielmo Waschimps
- Succeeded by: Ciro Cirillo

Personal details
- Born: 30 July 1930 Castellammare di Stabia, Italy
- Died: 8 August 2008 (aged 78) Rome, Italy
- Party: Christian Democracy
- Height: 1.74 m (5 ft 9 in)
- Parent: Silvio Gava (father)

Antonio Gava (30 July 1930 – 8 August 2008) was an Italian politician and member of Christian Democracy (DC). Son of the 13-time minister Silvio Gava, Antonio was one of the Christian Democratic Party's leading power-brokers in Campania over a 25-year period, beginning in 1968 and ending in 1993, when he was charged with membership of a criminal organisation. Together with Arnaldo Forlani and Vincenzo Scotti, he was the leader of DC's current known as "Alleanza Popolare" (or "Grande centro doroteo").

== Biography ==
Gava was born in Castellammare di Stabia in the Province of Naples and graduated in law. His father was Silvio Gava. After holding some provincial and regional positions in Campania for DC, he was elected in the Italian Parliament for the first time in 1972. In 1980 he was appointed Minister of the Relationships with Parliament in the cabinet led by Arnaldo Forlani. Later he was for three times Minister of Mail and Telecommunications and two times Minister of the Interior, from 1988 to 1990. He had to abandon the latter position when he was struck by a stroke.

On 21 September 1994 he was arrested for conspiring in a "perverse circuit of criminal enterprise" with the Camorra, the Neapolitan crime organization. Gava was accused of trading favors for votes mustered by the Camorra. Gava's alleged contacts in the Camorra were said to be primarily with first the group headed by Raffaele Cutolo and later with the group headed by Carmine Alfieri of Nola. According to the pentito (turncoat) Pasquale Galasso, both Gava and his father initially had strong ties with Alfonso Rosanova, the "spiritual father" of Cutolo.

Together with the other Neapolitan DC's moghul of the time, Vincenzo Scotti, he was also involved in the controversial release of Ciro Cirillo, kidnapped by Italian terrorist group Red Brigades in 1981. Publicly the Christian Democrats had refused to negotiate with terrorists, but privately leading politicians and members of the secret services visited Camorra boss Raffaele Cutolo in prison and asked him to negotiate with imprisoned members of the Red Brigades. A large ransom was paid to win Cirillo's release.

Despite numerous accusations, Antonio Gava was acquitted after 13 years of judicial fights of all charges of being associated with the Neapolitan Camorra. He announced he would sue the state for 38 million euros to compensate damages: 3 million for loss of professional earnings, 10 million for financial damage, 10 million for moral damage and 15 million for damage to his image.

He died on 8 August 2008 in Rome at the age of 78 after a long illness. He was nicknamed the 'Viceroy of Naples', due to his long reign in local politics, which was his power base for his national political career. Gava was known for his trade-mark large-brimmed hat, ivory-handled walking stick, gold ring and a cigar between his lips.

== Sources ==
- Behan, Tom (1996). The Camorra, London: Routledge, ISBN 0-415-09987-0
- Stille, Alexander (1995). Excellent Cadavers. The Mafia and the Death of the First Italian Republic, New York: Vintage ISBN 0-09-959491-9
- Media related to Antonio Gava at Wikimedia Commons
