= List of mayors of Naples =

Mayor of Naples
- Sindaco di Napoli
- Coat of arms of Naples

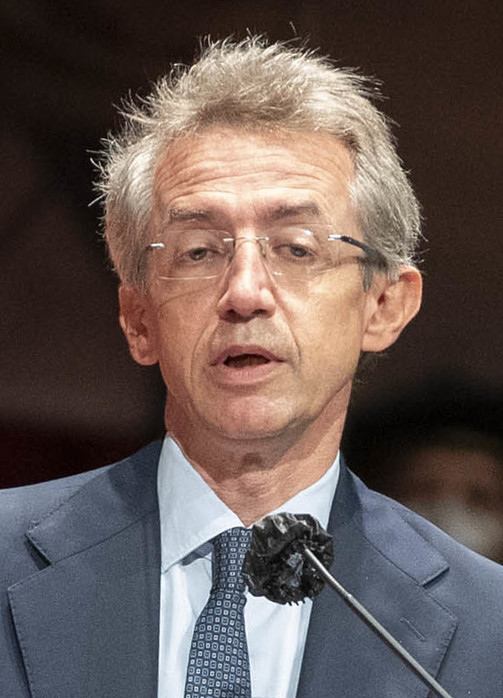
- Incumbent; Gaetano Manfredi since 18 October 2021
- Seat: Palazzo San Giacomo
- Appointer: Electorate of Naples
- Term length: 5 years, renewable once
- Inaugural holder: Andrea Colonna
- Formation: 30 March 1813
- Deputy: Laura Lieto
- Salary: €63,167 annually
- Website: Official website

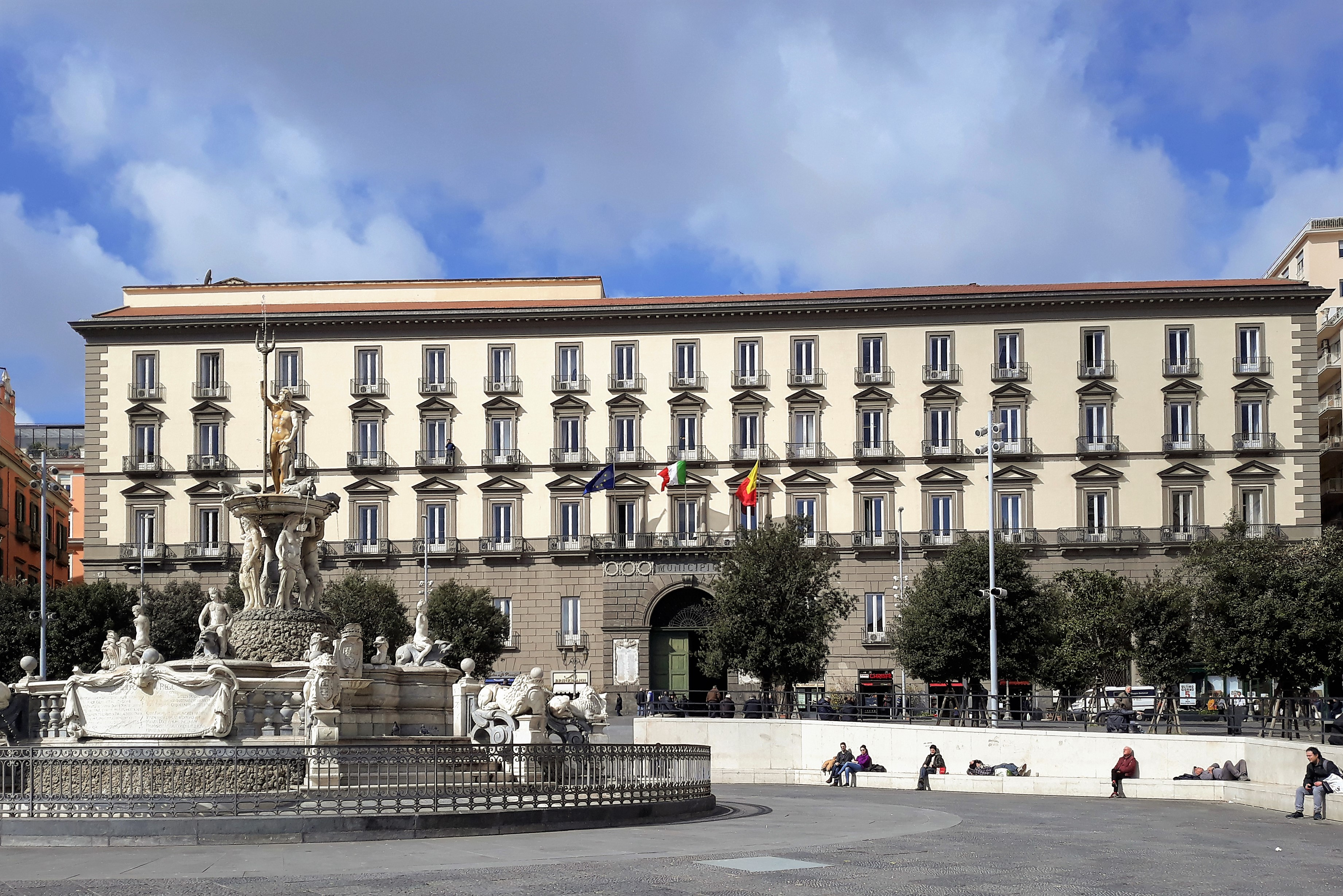
Palazzo San Giacomo, Naples' City Hall.

The mayor of Naples is an elected politician who, along with the Naples’s City Council of 40 members, is accountable for the strategic government of Naples.

== Overview ==
According to the Italian Constitution, the mayor of Naples is a member of the City Council of Naples. The mayor and the other 40 city councillors (consiglieri comunali) are elected for a five years term by the Italian and EU citizens residing in Naples.

After the election, the mayor can appoint one vice mayor and up to 16 assessors; together they form the municipal government (giunta comunale) and they implement the municipal policies, which are determined and controlled by the City Council. The City Council has also the power to dismiss the mayor or any of the assessors with a motion of no confidence.

Since 1993, Italian mayors of municipalities of more than 15,000 inhabitants have been directly elected by their respective electorates. Voters can express their choice for the mayor and for a list of municipal councillors not necessarily supporting the same mayor-candidate (voto disgiunto). If no mayor-candidate receives a majority of votes, a run-off election is held two weeks later among the top two candidates. In the list choice, each voter can express one or two preferences for councillor candidates; in the case of two preferences, their gender must be different. The party and civic lists supporting the elected mayor are granted a majority of the City Council seats, divided proportionally to each list result, by means of a majority bonus; the remaining seats are then assigned proportionally to the opposition lists.

The official seat of the mayor and of the City Council is Naples' City Hall, Palazzo San Giacomo.

== List ==
=== Kingdom of the Two Sicilies (1813–1861) ===
Mayor		Term start	Term end	Appointer
1	Marino Carafa di Belvedere	30 March 1813	7 February 1817	Joachim I
1	Marino Carafa di Belvedere	30 March 1813	7 February 1817	Ferdinand I
2	Michele de' Medici di Ottajano	7 February 1817	6 June 1818	Ferdinand I
3	Carlo Caracciolo	7 June 1818	2 March 1821	Ferdinand I
4	Francesco Tocco	23 July 1821	29 December 1823	Ferdinand I
5	Giuseppe Pignatelli	30 December 1823	30 December 1829	
5	Giuseppe Pignatelli	30 December 1823	30 December 1829	Francis I
5	Andrea Coppola	1 January 1830	26 May 1830	Francis I
6	Troiano Spinelli	27 May 1830	31 December 1835	Ferdinand II
7	Giuseppe Caracciolo	1 January 1836	31 December 1838	Ferdinand II
8	Nazario Sanfelice	1 January 1839	20 December 1847	Ferdinand II
9	Nazario Sanfelice	16 July 1848	14 January 1857	Ferdinand II
10	Giuseppe Pignone del Carretto	27 January 1857	7 September 1860	Ferdinand II
10	Giuseppe Pignone del Carretto	27 January 1857	7 September 1860	Francis II
11	Andrea Colonna di Stigliano	8 September 1860	30 November 1860	Vacant (Note: Dictatorship of Garibaldi.)
12	Giuseppe Colonna di Stigliano	1 December 1860	17 March 1861	Vacant

=== Kingdom of Italy (1861–1946) ===
Mayor		Term start	Term end	Party
1	Giuseppe Colonna di Stigliano	17 March 1861	8 May 1864	Independent
2	Rodrigo Nolli	1 September 1865	26 November 1866	Historical Right
3	Fedele De Siervo	27 November 1866	30 October 1867	Historical Right
4	Guglielmo Capitelli	17 April 1868	24 September 1870	Historical Right
5	Paolo Emilio Imbriani	25 September 1870	13 June 1872	Historical Right
6	Francesco Spinelli	3 October 1872	13 November 1875	Historical Right
7	Antonio Winspeare	14 November 1875	11 July 1876	Historical Right
8	Gennaro Sambiase Sanseverino	12 July 1876	26 April 1878	Historical Right
9	Girolamo Giusso	12 August 1876	17 May 1884	Historical Right
10	Nicola Amore	17 May 1884	17 November 1889	Historical Right
11	Giuseppe Caracciolo	20 November 1889	25 June 1891	Historical Right
12	Salvatore Fusco	12 January 1892	17 July 1893	Historical Left
13	Carlo del Pezzo	26 January 1894	17 February 1895	Historical Right
14	Emilio Capomazzi	6 August 1896	23 July 1898	Historical Right
15	Celestino Summonte	24 July 1898	10 November 1900	Historical Left
16	Luigi Miraglia	30 November 1901	18 October 1903	Historical Left
17	Ferdinando Del Carretto di Novello	19 October 1903	31 July 1914	Historical Right
18	Pasquale del Pezzo	1 August 1914	30 April 1917	Liberal Union
19	Enrico Presutti	1 May 1917	30 November 1922	Liberal Union
20	Alfredo Vittorio Russo	1 December 1920	21 November 1922	PNF
21	Raffaele Angiulli	22 November 1922	19 March 1926	PNF
Fascist Podestà (1926-1943)
1	Francesco Montuoso	20 March 1926	30 November 1927	PNF
2	Dante Alamasi	1 December 1927	5 January 1930	PNF
3	Giovanni De Riseis	6 January 1930	6 April 1932	PNF
4	Lorenzo La Via di Sant'Agrippina	7 April 1932	22 January 1934	PNF
5	Giovanni Niutta	23 January 1934	10 July 1936	PNF
6	Giovanni Orgera	11 July 1936	5 August 1943	PNF
Allied occupation and Liberation (1943-1946)
22	Giuseppe Solimene	6 August 1943	14 April 1944	Independent
23	Gustavo Ingrosso	15 April 1944	7 January 1945	PDL
24	Gennaro Fermariello	8 January 1945	5 September 1946	PdA

=== Italian Republic (1946–present) ===
From 1943 to 1993, the Mayor of Naples was elected by the City Council.

Mayor		Term start	Term end	Party	Coalition	Election
1	Giuseppe Buonocore	14 December 1946	1 March 1948	PNM	PNM • DC • PLI	1946
2	Domenico Moscati	1 March 1948	9 July 1952	DC	PNM • DC • PLI	1946
3	Achille Lauro	9 July 1952	6 January 1958	PNM; PMP	PNM • MSI	1952
3	Achille Lauro	9 July 1952	6 January 1958	PNM; PMP	PMP	1956
4	Nicola Sansanelli	6 January 1958	12 February 1958	PMP	PMP	1956
-	Special Prefectural Commissioner tenure (12 February 1958–4 February 1961) (Note: Nominated by the Prefect after the City Council failed to elect a Mayor. The Commissioner held the office for nearly 3 years. This tenure is still today one of the longest in the history of the Italian Republic.)					
(3)	Achille Lauro	4 February 1961	29 November 1961	PDIUM	PDIUM • DC • PLI	1960
-	Special Prefectural Commissioner tenure (29 November 1961–10 October 1962) (Note: Nominated by the Prefect after the City Council failed to elect a new Mayor.)					
5	Vincenzo Mario Palmieri	10 October 1962	31 July 1963	DC	PDIUM • DC	1962
6	Ferdinando Clemente di San Luca	31 July 1963	10 April 1964	DC	PDIUM • DC	1962
-	Special Prefectural Commissioner tenure (10 April 1964–27 January 1965) (Note: Nominated by the Prefect after the City Council failed to elect a new Mayor.)					
(6)	Ferdinando Clemente di San Luca	27 January 1965	20 January 1966	DC	DC • PSI • PSDI	1964
7	Giovanni Principe	20 January 1966	16 November 1970	DC	DC • PSI • PSDI	1964
8	Gerardo De Michele	16 November 1970	2 August 1974	DC	DC • PSI • PSDI • PRI	1970
9	Bruno Milanesi	2 August 1974	27 September 1975	DC	DC • PSI • PSDI • PRI	1970
10	Maurizio Valenzi	27 September 1975	16 April 1983	PCI	PCI • PSI • PSDI	1975
10	Maurizio Valenzi	27 September 1975	16 April 1983	PCI	PCI • PSI • PSDI	1980
-	Special Prefectural Commissioner tenure (16 April 1983–31 January 1984) (Note: Nominated by the Prefect after the City Council failed to elect a new Mayor.)					
11	Francesco Picardi	31 January 1984	30 April 1984	PSDI	DC • PSI • PSDI	1983
12	Vincenzo Scotti	30 April 1984	6 August 1984	DC	DC • PSI • PSDI	1983
13	Mario Forte	6 August 1984	29 November 1984	DC	DC • PSI • PSDI	1983
14	Carlo D'Amato	29 November 1984	22 October 1986	PSI	DC • PSI • PSDI • PRI • PLI	1983
-	Special Prefectural Commissioner tenure (22 October 1986–29 July 1987) (Note: Nominated by the Prefect after the City Council failed to elect a new Mayor.)					
15	Pietro Lezzi	29 July 1987	1 August 1990	PSI	DC • PSI • PRI • PLI	1987
16	Nello Polese	1 August 1990	2 April 1993	PSI	DC • PSI • PRI • PLI	1987
17	Francesco Tagliamonte	2 April 1993	6 August 1993	DC	DC • PSI • PRI • PLI	1992
-	Special Prefectural Commissioner tenure (6 August 1993–6 December 1993) (Note: Nominated by the Prefect after the Mayor and the members of the City Council resigned in order to hold a new election under the provision of the new local electoral law.)					

==== Direct election (since 1993) ====
Since 1993, under provisions of new local administration law, the Mayor of Naples is chosen by direct election, originally every four, and since 2001 every five years.

Mayor of Naples		Took office	Left office	Party	Coalition	Election
18	Antonio Bassolino (b. 1947)	6 December 1993	17 November 1997	PDS	Alliance of Progressives (PDS-PRC-FdV)	1993
18	Antonio Bassolino (b. 1947)	17 November 1997	24 May 2000 (Note: Resigned after being elected President of Campania in the regional election. The deputy mayor Riccardo Marone (DS) held the office till a new municipal election was held.)	PDS	The Olive Tree (PDS-PPI-PRC-FdV)	1997
19	Rosa Russo Iervolino (b. 1936)	28 May 2001	30 May 2006	DL; PD	The Olive Tree (DS-DL-PRC-SDI-PdCI)	2001
19	Rosa Russo Iervolino (b. 1936)	30 May 2006	1 June 2011	DL; PD	The Olive Tree (DS-DL-PRC-SDI-PdCI)	2006
20	Luigi de Magistris (b. 1967)	1 June 2011	20 June 2016	IdV; MA; DemA	IdV • FdS	2011
20	Luigi de Magistris (b. 1967)	20 June 2016	18 October 2021	IdV; MA; DemA	DemA • SI • PRC • FdV	2016
21	Gaetano Manfredi (b. 1964)	18 October 2021 (Note: Election originally scheduled for June 2021 then postponed due to the coronavirus pandemic.)	Incumbent	Ind	PD • M5S • EV • SI	2021

=== By time in office ===
Rank	Mayor	Total time in office
1	Luigi De Magistris	10 years, 139 days
2	Rosa Russo Iervolino	10 years, 4 days
3	Maurizio Valenzi	7 years, 201 days
4	Antonio Bassolino	6 years, 170 days
5	Achille Lauro	6 years, 114 days
6	Giovanni Principe	4 years, 300 days
7	Gaetano Manfredi	4 years, 334 days
8	Domenico Moscati	4 years, 130 days
9	Gerardo De Michele	3 years, 259 days
10	Pietro Lezzi	3 years, 3 days
11	Nello Polese	2 years, 244 days
12	Carlo D'Amato	1 year, 327 days
13	Ferdinando Clemente di San Luca	1 year, 247 days
14	Giuseppe Bonocore	1 year, 78 days
15	Bruno Milanesi	1 year, 56 days
16	Vincenzo Mario Palmieri	294 days
17	Francesco Tagliamonte	126 days
18	Mario Forte	115 days
19	Vincenzo Scotti	98 days
20	Francesco Picardi	90 days
21	Nicola Sansanelli	37 days

== Elections ==
=== Mayoral and City Council election, 1993 ===
The election took place on two rounds: the first on 21 November, the second on 5 December 1993.

Results

Candidate	Party	Coalition	First round		Second round	
Candidate	Party	Coalition	Votes	%	Votes	%
Antonio Bassolino	PDS	PDS-PRC-RS-FdV-LR	229,649	41.62	300,964	55.65
Alessandra Mussolini	MSI		171,315	31.05	239,867	44.35
Massimo Caprara	DC	DC-PSI-PSDI-PLI	77,643	14.07		
Angelo Sabatino	Ind		47,648	8.64		
Others			25,450	4.61		
Eligible voters			879,237	100.00	879,237	100.00
Voted			589,311	67.03	559,696	63.66
Blank or invalid ballots			37,596		18,865	
Total valid votes			551,715		540,831	

=== Mayoral and City Council election, 1997 ===
The election took place on 16 November 1997.

Results

Candidate	Party	Coalition	First round	
Candidate	Party	Coalition	Votes	%
Antonio Bassolino	PDS	The Olive Tree	399,454	72.92
Emiddio Novi	FI	Pole for Freedoms	138,406	25.26
Others			9,906	1.81
Eligible voters			861,455	100.00
Voted			587,285	68.17
Blank or invalid ballots			39,464	
Total valid votes			547,821	

=== Mayoral and City Council election, 2001 ===
The election took place in two rounds: the first on 13 May, the second on 27 May 2001.

Results

Candidate	Party	Coalition	First round		Second round	
Candidate	Party	Coalition	Votes	%	Votes	%
Rosa Russo Iervolino	DL	The Olive Tree	262,818	48.82	278,183	52.91
Antonio Martusciello	FI	House of Freedoms	246,089	45.71	247,564	47.09
Others			29,457	5.47		
Eligible voters			849,798	100.00	849,798	100.00
Voted			579,204	68.16	534,590	62.91
Blank or invalid ballots			40,840		8,843	
Total valid votes			538,364		525,747	

=== Mayoral and City Council election, 2006 ===
The election took place on 28–29 May 2006.

Results

Candidate	Party	Coalition	First round	
Candidate	Party	Coalition	Votes	%
Rosa Russo Iervolino	DL	The Olive Tree	304,975	57.20
Franco Malvano	FI	House of Freedoms	201,242	37.74
Others			26,962	5.06
Eligible voters			828,496	100.00
Voted			552,110	66.64
Blank or invalid ballots			18,931	
Total valid votes			533,179	

=== Mayoral and City Council election, 2011 ===
The election took place in two rounds: the first on 15–16 May, the second on 29–30 May 2011.

Results

Candidate	Party	Coalition	First round		Second round	
Candidate	Party	Coalition	Votes	%	Votes	%
Luigi De Magistris	IdV	IdV-FdS	128,303	27.52	264,730	65.38
Gianni Lettieri	PdL	PdL-FdS-NS-PID-PRI-LD-AdC	179,575	38.52	140,203	34.62
Mario Morcone	PD	PD-SEL	89,280	19.15		
Raimondo Pasquino	UDC	UDC-FLI-ApI	45,449	9.75		
Clemente Mastella	UDEUR		10,124	2.17		
Roberto Fico	M5S		6,441	1.38		
Others			7,002	1.51		
Eligible voters			812,450	100.00	812,450	100.00
Voted			490,142	60.33	410,907	50.58
Blank or invalid ballots			23,968		5,974	
Total valid votes			466,174		404,933	

Summary of the 2011 Naples City Council election results
Parties and coalitions		Votes	%	Seats
The People of Freedom (Il Popolo delle Libertà)	PdL	97,752	23.85%	8
Force of the South (Forza del Sud)	FdS	21,428	5.23%	1
We the South (Noi Sud)	NS	14,658	3.58%	1
Lettieri List (Lista Lettieri)	LL	12,571	3.07%	1
Others		30,490	7.43%	0
Lettieri coalition (Centre-right)		176,901	43.16%	11
Democratic Party (Partito Democratico)	PD	68,018	16.59%	5
Left Ecology Freedom (Sinistra Ecologia Libertà)	SEL	16,283	3.97%	0
Others		8,682	2.12%	0
Morcone coalition (Centre-left)		92,983	22.68%	5
Italy of Values (Italia dei Valori)	IdV	33,320	8.13%	15
Naples is Yours (Napoli è Tua)	NT	18,902	4.61%	8
Federation of the Left (Federazione della Sinistra)	FdS	15,008	3.66%	6
Others		1,292	0.32%	0
De Magistris coalition (Left-wing)		68,522	16.72%	29
Union of the Centre (Unione di Centro)	UDC	21,335	5.21%	2
Future and Freedom (Futuro e Libertà)	FLI	13,807	3.37%	1
Alliance for Italy (Alleanza per l'Italia)	ApI	6,003	1.46%	0
Others		5,904	1.44%	0
Pasquino coalition (Centre)		47,069	11.48%	3
Others		24,420	5.96%	0
Total		409,895	100%	48
Votes cast / turnout		490,142	60.33%	
Registered voters		812,450		
Source: Ministry of the Interior

=== Mayoral and City Council election, 2016 ===
The election took place in two rounds: the first on 5 June and the second on 19 June 2016.

Results

Candidate	Party	Coalition	First round		Second round	
Candidate	Party	Coalition	Votes	%	Votes	%
Luigi De Magistris	DemA	DemA-SI-FdV-PRC-PCd'I-IdV	172,710	42.82	185,907	66.85
Gianni Lettieri	FI		96,961	24.04	92,174	33.15
Valeria Valente	PD	PD-AP-UDC-CD-Mod-PSI	85,225	21.13		
Matteo Brambilla	M5S		38,863	9.64		
Marcello Tagliatela	FdI		5,186	1.29		
Others			4,336	1.08		
Eligible voters			788,291	100.00	788,291	100.00
Voted			426,602	54.12	283,542	35.97
Blank or invalid ballots			23,291		5,461	
Total valid votes			403,311		278,081	

Summary of the 2016 Naples City Council election results
Parties and coalitions		Votes	%	Seats
De Magistris List (Lista De Magistris)	LDM	51,896	13.79%	10
Democracy and Autonomy (Democrazia e Autonomia)	DemA	28,587	7.60%	5
Naples in Common to the Left (Napoli in Comune a Sinistra)	NCS	19,945	5.30%	4
Federation of the Greens (Federazione dei Verdi)	FdV	11,341	3.01%	2
Others		37,971	10.08%	3
De Magistris coalition (Left-wing)		149,740	39.80%	24
Forza Italia	FI	36,145	9.61%	4
Lettieri List (Lista Lettieri)	LL	28,869	7.67%	2
Others		27,347	7.27%	1
Lettieri coalition (Centre-right)		92,361	24.55%	7
Democratic Party (Partito Democratico)	PD	43,790	11.64%	6
Popular Area (Area Popolare)	AP	7,521	2.00%	1
Others		37,675	10.01%	0
Valente coalition (Centre-left)		88,986	23.65%	7
Five Star Movement (Movimento Cinque Stelle)	M5S	36,359	9.66%	2
Others		8,817	2.35%	0
Total		376,263	100%	40
Votes cast / turnout		426,602	54.12%	
Registered voters		788,291		
Source: Ministry of the Interior

=== Mayoral and City Council election, 2021 ===
The election took place on 3–4 October 2021.

Results

Candidate	Party	Coalition	First round	
Candidate	Party	Coalition	Votes	%
Gaetano Manfredi	Ind	PD-M5S-SI-EV	218,077	62.88
Catello Maresca	Ind	FI-FdI-NcI-UDC	75,891	21.88
Antonio Bassolino	Ind	A-PG	28,451	8.20
Alessandra Clemente	PaP		19,338	5.58
Others			5,050	1.45
Eligible voters			776,751	100.00
Voted			366,374	47.17
Blank or invalid ballots			19,567	
Total valid votes			346,807	

== Deputy Mayor ==
The office of the Deputy Mayor of Naples was officially created in 1993 with the adoption of the new local administration law. The Deputy Mayor is nominated and eventually dismissed by the Mayor.

	Deputy	Term start	Term end	Party	Mayor
1	Ada Becchi	16 December 1993	10 September 1994 (Note: Resigned.)	PDS	Bassolino
2	Riccardo Marone	21 September 1994	17 November 1997	PDS; DS	Bassolino
2	Riccardo Marone	28 November 1997	28 May 2001	PDS; DS	Bassolino
3	Rocco Papa	7 June 2001	30 May 2006	DS	Iervolino
4	Santangelo Sabatino	19 June 2006	1 June 2011	Ind	Iervolino
5	Tommaso Sodano	13 June 2011	16 June 2015 (Note: Resigned.)	PRC	De Magistris
6	Raffaele Del Giudice	19 June 2015	20 June 2016	Ind	De Magistris
6	Raffaele Del Giudice	27 June 2016	25 October 2018 (Note: Resigned.)	Ind	De Magistris
7	Enrico Panini	26 October 2018	12 January 2021 (Note: Dismissed by the Mayor.)	DemA	De Magistris
8	Carmine Piscopo	12 January 2021	18 October 2021	DemA	De Magistris
9	Maria Filippone	22 October 2021	16 July 2022 (Note: Died in office.)	Ind	Manfredi
10	Laura Lieto	5 August 2022	Incumbent	Ind	Manfredi

== See also ==
- Timeline of Naples
