= Luigi Cesaro =

Italian politician (born 1952)

- Cesaro in 2018

Member of the Senate of the Republic
- In office 23 March 2018 – 12 October 2022

Member of the Chamber of Deputies
- In office 30 May 2001 – 22 March 2018
- In office 9 May 1996 – 31 May 2000

President of the Province of Naples
- In office 8 June 2009 – 18 March 2013
- Preceded by: Dino Di Palma
- Succeeded by: Office abolished

Mayor of Sant'Antimo
- In office 14 June 2004 – 5 January 2006
- Preceded by: Maria Elena Stasi
- Succeeded by: Rosanna Sergio

Member of the European Parliament
- In office 20 July 1999 – 19 July 2004
- Constituency: Southern Italy

Personal details
- Born: 19 February 1952 (age 74) Sant'Antimo, Province of Naples, Italy
- Party: Italian Socialist Party; Forza Italia; The People of Freedom; Forza Italia
- Education: University of Naples Federico II
- Occupation: Lawyer

Luigi Cesaro (born 19 February 1952) is an Italian politician and lawyer. He began his political career in the Italian Socialist Party, later joining Forza Italia in 1994. He served as a member of the European Parliament from 1999 to 2004, and as a member of the Chamber of Deputies from 1996 to 2000 and again from 2001 to 2018. In 2009, he was elected president of the Province of Naples with The People of Freedom. He was subsequently a member of the Senate of the Republic from 2018 to 2022. He also served as mayor of Sant'Antimo.

In 2011, the Naples District Anti-Mafia Directorate investigated Cesaro over alleged relations with the Casalesi clan of Camorra and suspected irregularities in construction projects. The investigation was subsequently archived. In 2014, prosecutors sought authorization to arrest Cesaro in a separate investigation concerning alleged external participation in a mafia-type association and bid rigging involving construction projects in Lusciano, allegedly linked to the Bidognetti clan. The arrest order was annulled by the Naples Review Court.

In a separate 2021 trial concerning alleged vote buying in the Marano di Napoli area, Cesaro was acquitted after the court ruled that the prosecution's intercepted conversations were inadmissible.
