= Party of Sicilians =

Italian political party

Party of Sicilians Partito dei Siciliani
- Leader: Raffaele Lombardo
- Founded: August 2012
- Ideology: Sicilian regionalism Autonomism; Christian democracy
- Political position: Centre-right
- National affiliation: Movement for Autonomies
- Sicilian Regional Assembly: 6 / 70

The Party of Sicilians (Italian: Partito dei Siciliani, PdS) was a regionalist and Christian-democratic political party in Sicily. It was the Sicilian regional section of the Movement for Autonomy (MpA).

== History ==
In August 2012 it was announced that the Sicilian section of the MpA would be renamed Party of Sicilians (PdS). Contextually, Raffaele Lombardo, MpA leader and incumbent President of Sicily, chose not to run again in the 2012 Sicilian regional election. The newly formed PdS supported Gianfranco Micciché for President, as part of a "Sicilianist" coalition comprising Micciché's Great South (GS), the Sicilian People's Movement (MPS) and the regional section of Future and Freedom (FLI). Micciché won 15.4% of the vote, while the PdS obtained 9.5% and ten regional deputies.

In 2017 Angelo Attaguile, the only member of PdS in the Chamber of Deputies, led a split from the party and became secretary of Us with Salvini (NcS), sister party of Lega Nord (LN) in southern Italy. Another split occurred in 2015 when Rino Piscitello, PdS secretary since 2013, launched Sicily Nation (SN), which would later merge into the Sicilian National Movement (MNS).

In the 2017 regional election the PdS/MpA formed teamed up with Francesco Saverio Romano's Cantiere Popolare (CP) under the banner of "Populars and Autonomists". The list won 7.1% of the vote, obtained six regional deputies and entered the regional government led by Nello Musumeci, the newly elected President of Sicily.

After that, the PdS was absorbed into the MpA, which was re-organised in Sicily alone.

== Electoral results ==
=== Regional elections ===
Election	Leader	Votes	%	Seats	+/−
2012	Giovanni Pistorio	182,737 (5th)	9.5	10 / 90	–
2017	Giuseppe Maria Reina	136,520 (4th) (Note: In a joint list with Cantiere Popolare.)	7.1	6 / 70	▼4

== Leadership ==
- Secretary: Giovanni Pistorio (2012–2015), Rino Piscitello (2013–2015)
