= Sicilian National Front =

Sicilian National Front Frunti Nazziunali Sicilianu Fronte Nazionale Siciliano
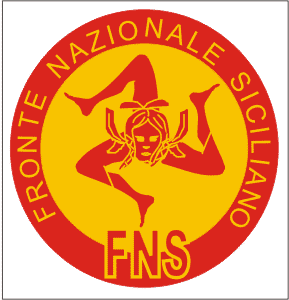
- Abbreviation: FNS
- President: Francesco Calcagno
- Secretary: Francesco Perspicace
- Founded: 1964
- Headquarters: Via Brunetto Latini 26, Palermo
- Ideology: Sicilian nationalism Progressivism

The Sicilian National Front "Independent Sicily" (Sicilian: Frunti Nazziunali Sicilianu "Sicilia Ndipinnenti", Italian: Fronte Nazionale Siciliano "Sicilia Indipendente", abbr. FNS) is a political party active in Sicily, Italy. Its historical leader was Giuseppe "Pippo" Scianò.

== History ==
The party was founded in 1964 in Sicily. It was first joined by the Young Sicilian League, a youth organization that rebranded itself, as the former Separatist Youth League. The FNS immediately established itself as a democratic and progressive force of the Sicilian people.

The first secretary of the party was Nino Scalisi; after Scalisi, the leadership of the party was assumed by Orio Poerio, who died prematurely, and then by Giuseppe Scianò, who was confirmed at the 12th National Congress, while Prof. Corrado Mirto was named its president.

At the 2016 party congress, Francesco Perspicace was elected as the new party secretary.

In January 2017, the FNS, together with Sicily Nation, led by Rino Piscitello, and the Movement for the Independence of Sicily, led by Salvatore Musumeci, founded a new coalition called the Sicilian National Movement, with the aim of launching Gaetano Armao's candidacy for president of the Sicily region.

== Political positions ==
The Sicilian National Front represents and expresses a wide range of separatist and independence political positions, ranging from liberal to Catholic-democratic positions to the left. Ideologies and extremist sectarian positions, whether right-wing or left-wing, are excluded.
