= San Giacomo degli Spagnoli, Naples =

Basilica church in Naples, Italy

Basilica of San Giacomo degli Spagnoli Basilica di San Giacomo degli Spagnoli (in Italian)
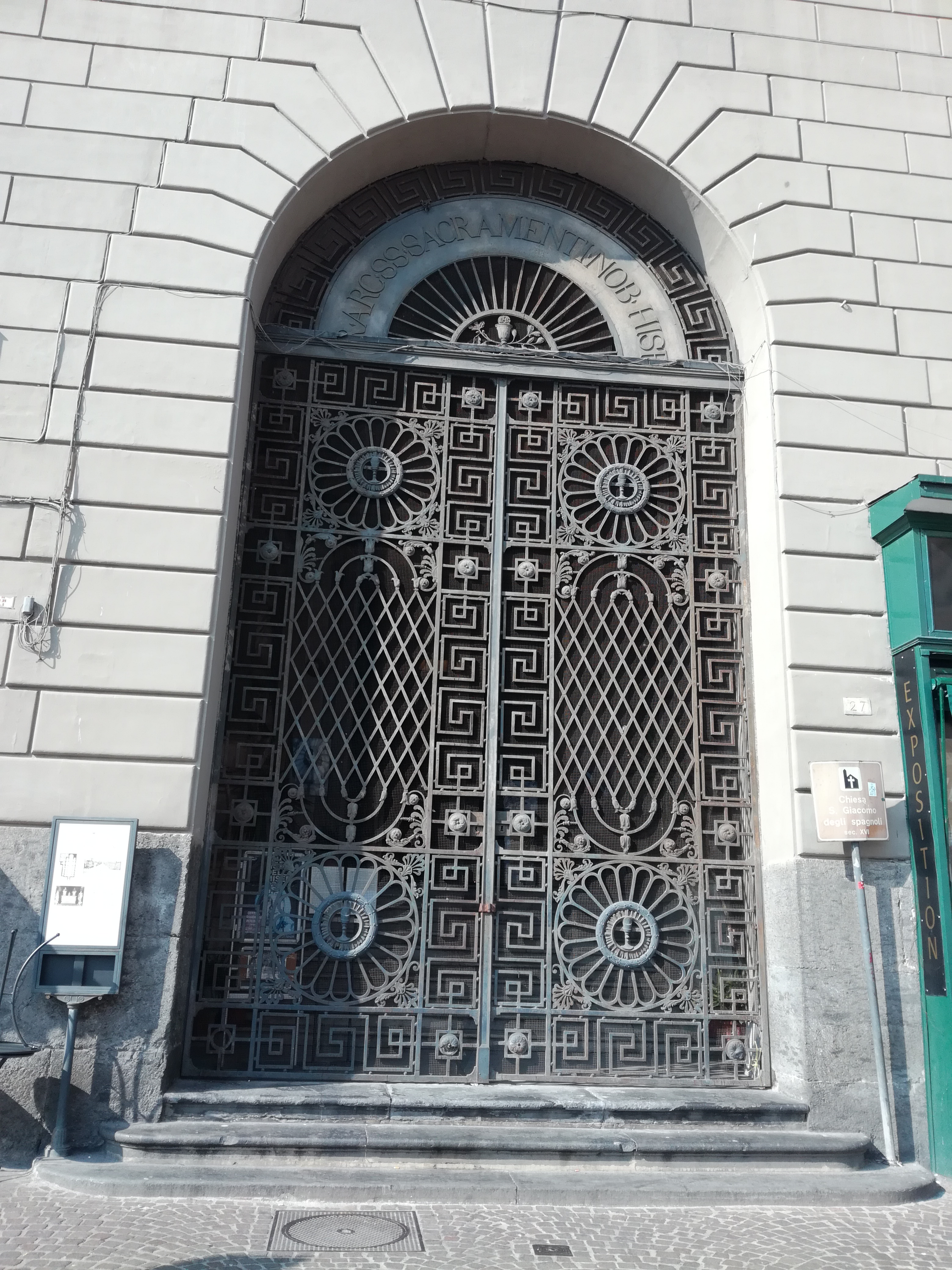
- Façade of St. James palace with the entrance arch to the church in the foreground.

Religion
- Affiliation: Roman Catholic
- Diocese: Archdiocese of Naples
- Ecclesiastical or organizational status: Minor basilica

Location
- Location: Naples, Campania, Italy
- Interactive map of Basilica of San Giacomo degli Spagnoli; Basilica di San Giacomo degli Spagnoli (in Italian)
- Coordinates: 40.840650°N 14.249920°E

Architecture
- Type: Church

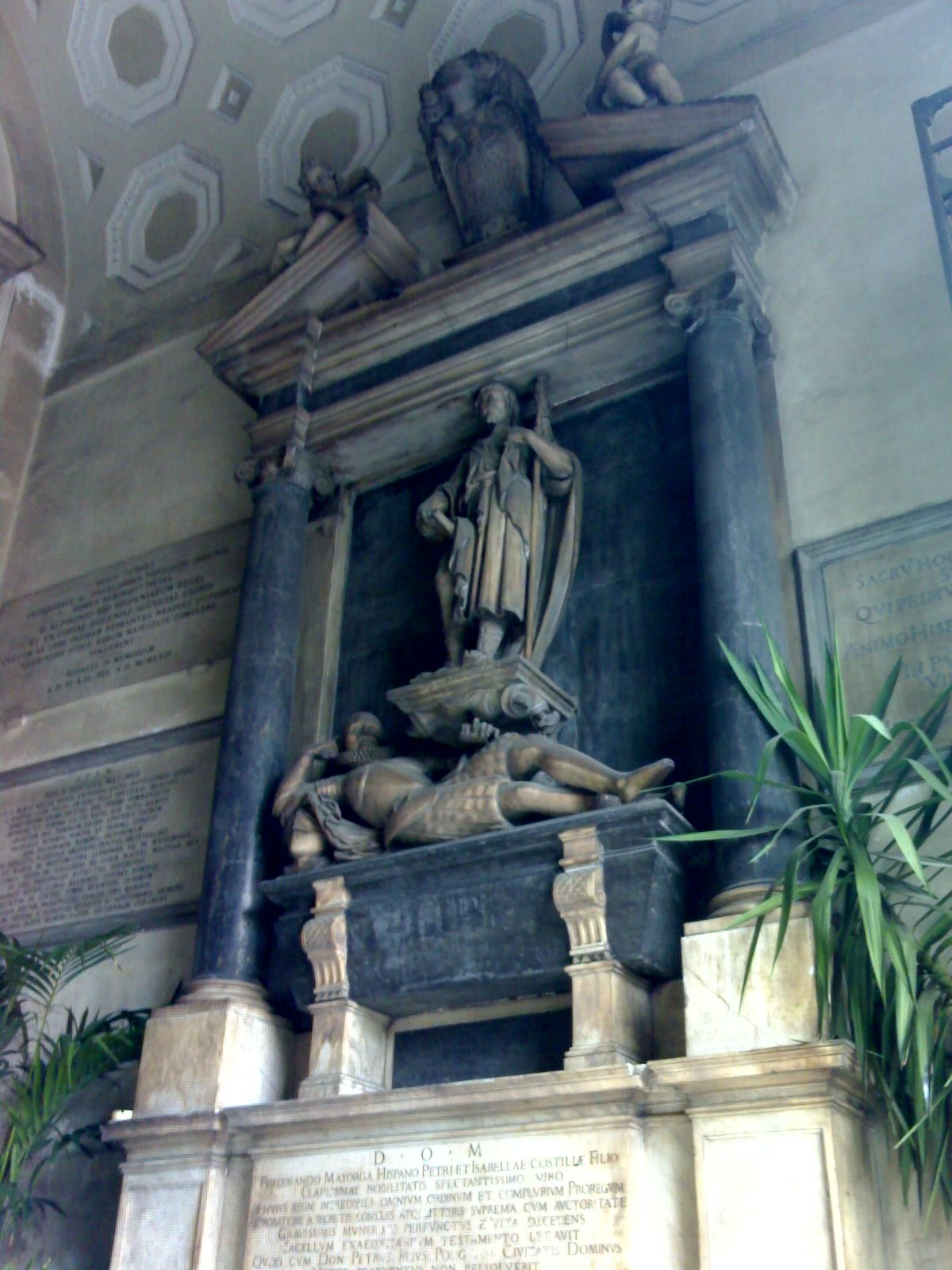
Monument to Ferdinando Maiorca.

San Giacomo degli Spagnoli is a basilica church in Piazza Municipio in central Naples, Italy. The Renaissance church was enveloped in 1812 by the Palazzo San Giacomo built by King Ferdinand I of Bourbon when he built a central block of offices for the ministries of his government adjacent to the fortress of the Castel Nuovo. The Palazzo San Giacomo is now the municipio or city hall of Naples. Another church of San Giacomo degli Spagnoli is found in Rome.

The original church was commissioned in 1540 by the Spanish viceroy Don Pedro Álvarez de Toledo, Marquis of Villafranca and associated with the adjacent hospital for the poor. The church was dedicated to St James, the patron saint of Spain, and designed by Ferdinando Manlio. The construction of the Palazzo San Giacomo did away with the facade, but retained the internal layout of three naves and a tall central ceiling.

The interior still retains a number of monumental tombs, including for the viceroy Don Pedro de Toledo, his wife and son, sculpted in 1570 by Giovanni da Nola. Near the entrance are two sculptures by Francesco Cassano. In addition the tomb of Ferdinando Maiorca and his wife Porzia Coniglia in the apse was completed by Michelangelo Naccherino. The tomb of Alfonso Basurto, was carved by Annibale Caccavello and Giovanni Domenico D'Auria.

The church was elevated to the status of basilica in 1911 but then suffered damage during the bombing of World War II. It is now rarely opened to the public.
