= Sicily Nation =

Sicilian political party

Sicily Nation (Italian: Sicilia Nazione, SN) is a separatist Italian political party active in Sicily.

The party was founded in January 2015 by Gaetano Armao, a former regional minister of Economy under President Raffaele Lombardo, and Rino Piscitello, a long-time politician (Proletarian Unity Party, Proletarian Democracy, The Network, The Democrats, Democracy is Freedom, Democratic Party) who had lately been the secretary of Lombardo's Party of Sicilians. The party aimed at the transformation of Sicily into a nation confederated to Italy or an independent country.

In January 2017 SN was a founding member of the Sicilian National Movement (MNS), along with the Sicilian Independence Movement (re-edition of the separatist party which was active after World War II) and the Sicilian National Front. The MNS supported Armao for President of Sicily in the 2017 regional election.

In 2017, SN merged with the Sicilian National Movement and the Union of Indignant Sicilians into the Union of Sicilians.

== Leadership ==
- Coordinator: Gaetano Armao
- Members of the National Committee: Gaetano Armao, Massimo Costa, Rino Piscitello
