= Luigi Miraglia (politician) =

Italian politician and law professor

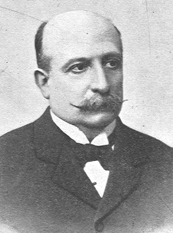
- Born: 31 May 1846; Reggio Calabria, Calabria, Kingdom of the Two Sicilies
- Died: 23 September 1903 (aged 57); Naples, Italy
- Education: University of Naples
- Occupations: Law professor University Dean; University Rector; Mayor of Naples; Senator
- Political party: "Historical Left"
- Children: Nicoletta; Carlo
- Parent(s): Carmine Miraglia; Rosa Masci/Miraglia

Luigi Miraglia (31 May 1846 – 23 September 1903) was a university law professor who served between 1895 and 1897 as rector of the University of Naples. During his final years he made the switch to national politics, appointed to the Italian Senate on 14 June 1900. He also served as Mayor of Naples between 30 November 1901 and his death.

== Biography ==
Luigi Miraglia was born at the extreme south of the Italian Peninsula in Reggio Calabria. His elder brother, Giuseppe Miraglia (1834–1896), would also become a senator.

He was still only 20 when he graduated from the University of Naples with a law degree. On 22 October 1874, having won a public competition for the post, he started work as Professor of Law, political economy and Statistics at the "Scuola superiore di agricoltura di Portici" (agricultural college) which had recently been created in the old Palace of Portici, along the coast near the site of Herculaneum, to the south-east of the city. One and a half years later, he transferred to the University of Naples, installed on 15 March 1876 as Professor in charge of Pedagogy. He accepted a full professorship of philosophy on 14 March 1902, retaining his teaching chair for the rest of his life. Within the philosophy department, he taught Jurisprudence. A succession of promotions on the administrative side accompanied his academic responsibilities. He was appointed University Dean in 1884 and University Rector on 8 October 1895.

Miraglia was nominated to the senate in June 1900. However, in November 1901, he was unexpectedly invited by Neapolitan city politicians to accept the appointment as Mayor of Naples. On paying tribute to Miraglia following his death, the president of the senate described this as "a dangerous honour", while paying tribute to the intellectual and moral abilities which enabled the new mayor to resolve the "disorder and collapse" into which the city administration of Naples had fallen prior to his appointment. Luigi Miraglia died suddenly in Naples, slightly less than two years into his mayoral term.
