= Palazzo San Giacomo, Naples =

Palace in central Naples, Italy

Palace of San Giacomo
- Palazzo San Giacomo
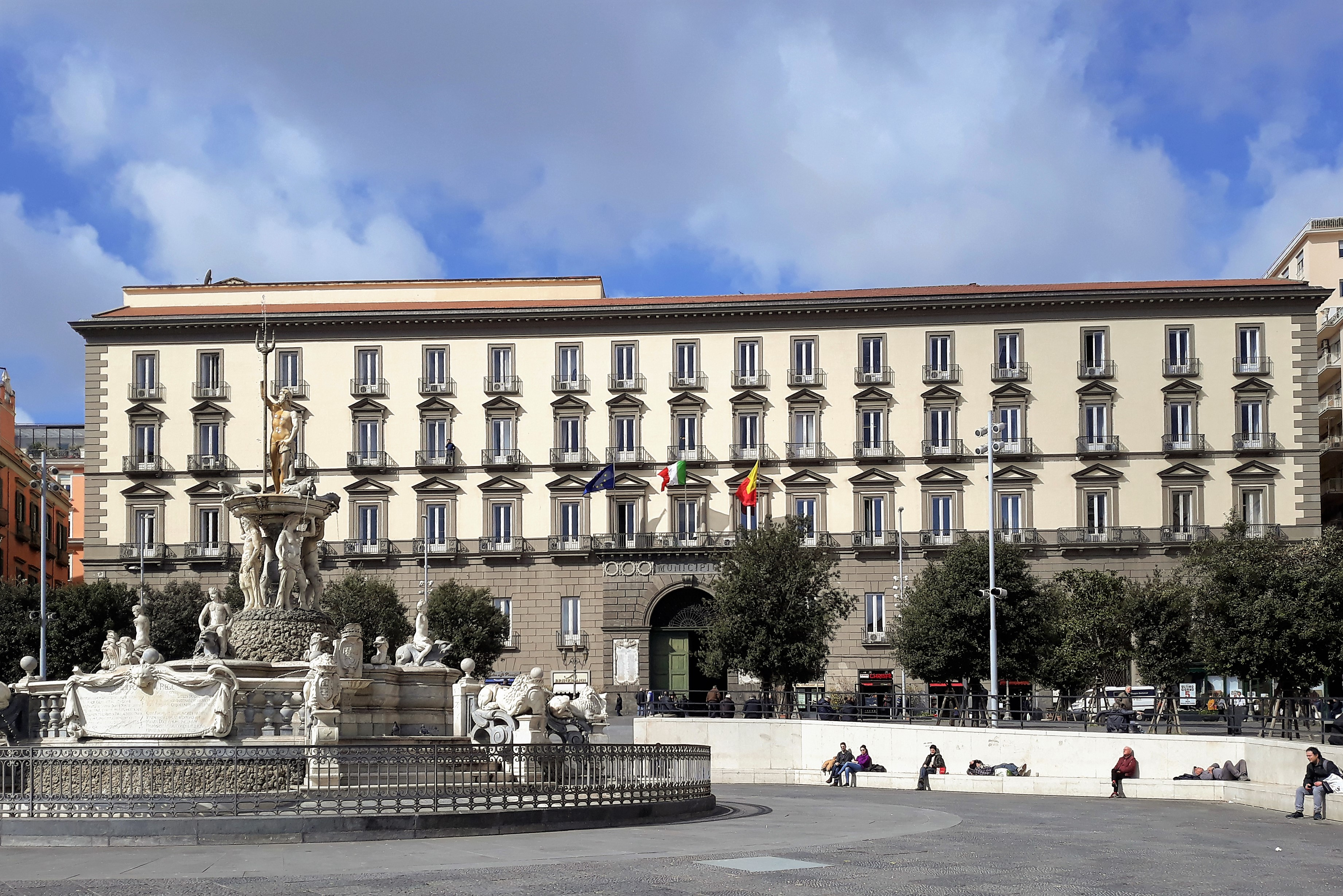
- Palazzo San Giacomo façade
- Alternative names: Palazzo del Municipio

General information
- Status: Office of the Mayor of Naples
- Type: Palace
- Architectural style: Neo-Classical
- Location: Naples, Italy
- Address: Piazza del Municipio, 80132
- Coordinates: 40.8403°N 14.2500°E
- Current tenants: Municipality of Naples
- Construction started: 1819
- Completed: 1825
- Client: Ferdinand I of the Two Sicilies
- Owner: Kingdom of the Two Sicilies
- Landlord: Municipality of Naples

Technical details
- Floor count: 4

Design and construction
- Architect(s): Stefano Gasse

Website
- Comune of Naples (in Italian)

Invalid designation
- Official name: Palazzo San Giacomo
- Type: Non-movable
- Criteria: Monument
- State Party: Italy

The Palazzo San Giacomo, known as the Municipio (city hall) is a Neoclassical style palace in central Naples, Italy. It stands before the fortress of the Maschio Angioino, stradling the zones of Porto and San Ferdinando. It houses the mayor and the offices of the municipality of Naples. The entire office complex spans from largo de Castello to Via Toledo, along via di San Giacomo.

In 1816, King Ferdinand I of the Two Sicilies commissioned the construction of a centralized building to house the various ministries of the government. The area for this palace was chosen, and the buildings therein were either demolished or incorporated including the monastery and church of the Concezione (once known as Santa Maria Fior delle Vergini), the Hospital of San Giacomo, and the offices of the Bank of San Giacomo. The church of San Giacomo degli Spagnoli was incorporated into the palace.

The architects were Vincenzo Buonocore, Antonio De Simone, and Stefano Gasse. Work was only completed in 1825. In the atrium are two statues of Kings Ruggiero the Norman and Frederick of Swabia. The statues of the Bourbon Kings, Ferdinand I and Francesco I of the Two Sicilies, that once stood in niches here, were substituted by allegorical figures. The entry way also has a head from a bust which has been assigned to the mythical representative of Naples, the siren Parthenope.
