= Sicilian National Movement =

The Sicilian National Movement (Italian: Movimento Nazionale Siciliano, MNS) is a separatist coalition of parties active in Sicily.

The coalition was launched in November 2016 and officially founded in January 2017. Its three founding members were: Sicily Nation (SN), the Movement for the Independence of Sicily (MIS; re-edition of the separatist party which was active after World War II) and the Sicilian National Front (FNS).

Since its foundation, the MNS supported Gaetano Armao, SN leader, for President of Sicily in the 2017 regional election.

In the summer of 2017 Armao, with the support of the MNS, launched a broader Union of Indignant Sicilians (Unione dei Siciliani Indignati, USI), received the support of Silvio Berlusconi and Forza Italia (FI), and was selected as candidate for Vice President, in ticket with candidate for President Nello Musumeci, representing a broad centre-right coalition, notably including FI, Brothers of Italy, Us with Salvini, the Party of Sicilians and the Union of the Centre.

After the election, in which the MNS did not field own lists, and Musumeci's election as President, Armao was sworn in as Vice President and minister of Economy.
