= Great South (Italy) =

Regionalist political party in Italy

Great South Grande Sud
- Abbreviation: GS
- Leader: Gianfranco Miccichè
- Founder: Gianfranco Miccichè; Gianfranco Blasi
- Founded: 5 September 2011
- Dissolved: 23 November 2013
- Preceded by: Force of the South
- Merged into: Forza Italia
- Ideology: Regionalism; Christian democracy Liberalism
- Political position: Centre-right
- Colours: Orange

Website
- www.grandesud.it (inactive)

Great South (Italian: Grande Sud) was a centre-right and regionalist political party in Italy led by Gianfranco Miccichè of Sicily. Established by Miccichè and Gianfranco Blasi of Basilicata in September 2011 as the successor of Force of the South, the party was able to elected several regional councillors and members of the Senate of the Republic by 2013. In November 2013, Great South was merged into the new Forza Italia (FI).

== History ==
In September 2011, Great South was co-founded by former Forza Italia (FI) and People of Freedom (PdL) deputy Gianfranco Miccichè and former Forza Italia deputy Gianfranco Blasi. Miccichè was the party leader, while Blasi served as the national secretary for territorial organisation.

In January 2012, Great South formed a sub-group in the Mixed Group of the Chamber of Deputies, including (in addition to Miccichè) the six Force of the South deputies (Giuseppe Fallica, Ugo Grimaldi, Maurizio Iapicca, Antonino Minardo, Francesco Stagno D'Alcontres, and Giacomo Terranova) and two new entries (Aurelio Misiti, from Italy of Values or IdV, who was appointed chairman, and Gerardo Soglia, from the PdL) but not the three deputies of We the South (NS). In March 2012, the party was joined by Giancarlo Pittelli. The party was at times referred to as Project South (Italian: Progetto Sud).

In the 2012 Sicilian regional election, Miccichè ran as part of a Sicilianist coalition also including the Party of Sicilians (PdS), the Sicilian People's Movement (MPS), and the local wing of Future and Freedom (FLI). While Miccichè finished fourth with 15.4% of the vote in the election for president of Sicily, the party obtained 6.0%, returning five regional deputies in the Sicilian Regional Assembly.

In the 2013 Italian general election, Great South was part of the centre-right coalition led by the PdL, with Blasi organising the party's electoral lists. Great South obtained the 0.43% of the vote for the Chamber of Deputies and the 0.39% of the vote for the Senate of the Republic, electing a senator in Calabria and two senators in the PdL's list in Sicily. In November 2013, despite some internal dissent, Great South became virtually inactive as an independent party when it joined the new Forza Italia.

== Composition ==
Politically, Great South was a regionalist, liberal, and Christian democratic party. Great South was initially composed of several parties.

Party	Main ideology	Leader	Home region
Force of the South	Liberal conservatism	Gianfranco Micciché	Sicily
I the South	National conservatism	Adriana Poli Bortone	Apulia
We the South	Christian democracy	Arturo Iannaccone	Campania

== See also ==
- List of political parties in Italy
