= Ciro Cirillo =

Italian politician (1921–2017)

President of Campania
- In office 12 September 1979 – 13 August 1980
- Preceded by: Gaspare Russo
- Succeeded by: Emilio De Feo

President of the Province of Naples
- In office 1969–1975
- Preceded by: Antonio Gava
- Succeeded by: Giuseppe Iacono

Personal details
- Born: 15 February 1921 Naples, Kingdom of Italy
- Died: 30 July 2017 (aged 96) Torre del Greco, Italy
- Party: Christian Democracy

Ciro Cirillo (Italian pronunciation: [ˈtʃiːro tʃiˈrillo]; 15 February 1921 – 30 July 2017) was an Italian politician and member of the Christian Democracy (DC) political party. He served as the president of the province of Naples from 1969 to 1975 and the president of Campania from 1979 until 1980. Cirillo oversaw reconstruction efforts in the aftermath of the 1980 Irpinia earthquake, which struck the region on 23 November 1980.

In 1981, Cirillo was kidnapped by the Red Brigades (BR), an Italian paramilitary group, in a case that garnered worldwide attention. He was released on 25 July 1981, following 89 days in captivity and a ransom payment of 1.45 billion lire. The ransom was a controversial deal with the Camorra; they did not negotiate with the BR and only asked them to release him. This happened several years after the Italian state had refused to negotiate with the BR in their kidnapping and murder of Aldo Moro, leading observers and critics to wonder what changed and the reasons behind the state's negotiation.

== Biography ==
Cirillo was raised in Torre del Greco. He began his career at the Camera di Commercio, Industria, Agricoltura e Artigianato, the chamber of commerce of Naples. He joined the DC and served as the DC's Naples provincial party secretary during the 1960s. Cirillo rose to become a key figure of the regional DC and a political ally of Antonio Gava. He served as the president of the province of Naples from 1969 until 1975. In 1979, Cirillo was elected president of Campania, a position he held from 1979 to 1980. He then became the regional councillor of public works and chairman of the commission which oversaw the region's recovery efforts following the Irpinia earthquake in November 1980.

=== Kidnapping ===
On 27 April 1981, Cirllo was kidnapped from his home in Torre del Greco by five members of the BR. During the kidnapping, Cirillo's police escort, Giovanni Senanzi, and his chauffeur, Mario Cancello, were killed in a shoot out between the BR and the police, while his secretary suffered leg wounds. Cirillo was held captive by the BR for 89 days. While Cirillo's kidnapping drew worldwide headlines, many of the events during this time period remain a mystery to the present day. Cirillo was finally released on 25 July 1981, following a controversial ransom payment by the DC of 1.45 billion lire (the equivalent of 748,000 euros in 2017). The ransom proved contentious, as the DC had previously refused payment for the release of former prime minister Aldo Moro, who was kidnapped and killed by the BR in 1978 following 55 days of captivity.

The outcome of the Cirillo kidnapping stood in sharp contrast to the kidnapping and murder of Moro. When Moro was abducted by the BR in 1978, the DC-led government immediately took a hardline position: the "state must not bend" on terrorist demands. They refused to negotiate with the BR, while local DC members in Campania made every effort and even negotiated with criminals to release Cirillo, a relatively minor politician in comparison with Moro.

In 2000, Cirillo told La Repubblica that he had written a letter with his version of the kidnapping, to be released by his lawyer after his death. He later retracted the letter's existence, telling Il Mattino newspaper: "It was a bluff. There was a period where I was harassed by journalists. Two Tuscan journalists stood out...I invented a story of a secret account to brush them off." In another interview in 2006, he also expressed frustration at the DC party, which had asked him to leave office soon after his release by his kidnappers in 1981.

Cirillo, who was married with children, died on 30 July 2017, at the age of 96. His funeral was held at the Carmelitani Scalzi church in Torre del Greco on 31 July 2017.
