= Mario Forte =

Italian politician (1936–2025)

Mayor of Naples
- In office 6 August 1984 – 28 November 1984
- Preceded by: Vincenzo Scotti
- Succeeded by: Carlo D'Amato

Member of the European Parliament for Southern Italy
- In office 25 July 1989 – 18 July 1994

Personal details
- Born: 22 September 1936 Naples, Italy
- Died: 11 August 2025 (aged 88) Naples, Italy
- Party: DC (until 1994); PPI (after 1994)

Mario Forte (22 September 1936 – 11 August 2025) was an Italian politician. A member of Christian Democracy and the Italian People's Party, he served as mayor of Naples from August to November 1984 and was a member of the European Parliament from 1989 to 1994.

Forte died in Naples on 11 August 2025, at the age of 88.
