= 2012 Sicilian regional election =

- 28 October 2012

All 90 seats to the Sicilian Regional Assembly 46 seats needed for a majority
- Turnout: 47.42% (▼19.26%)
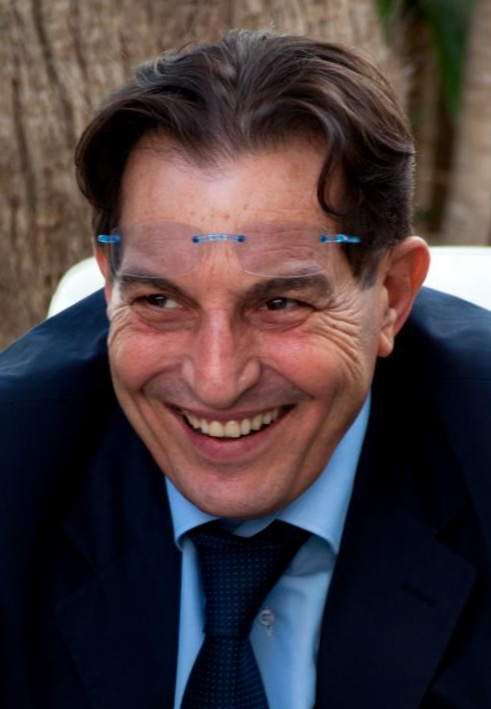

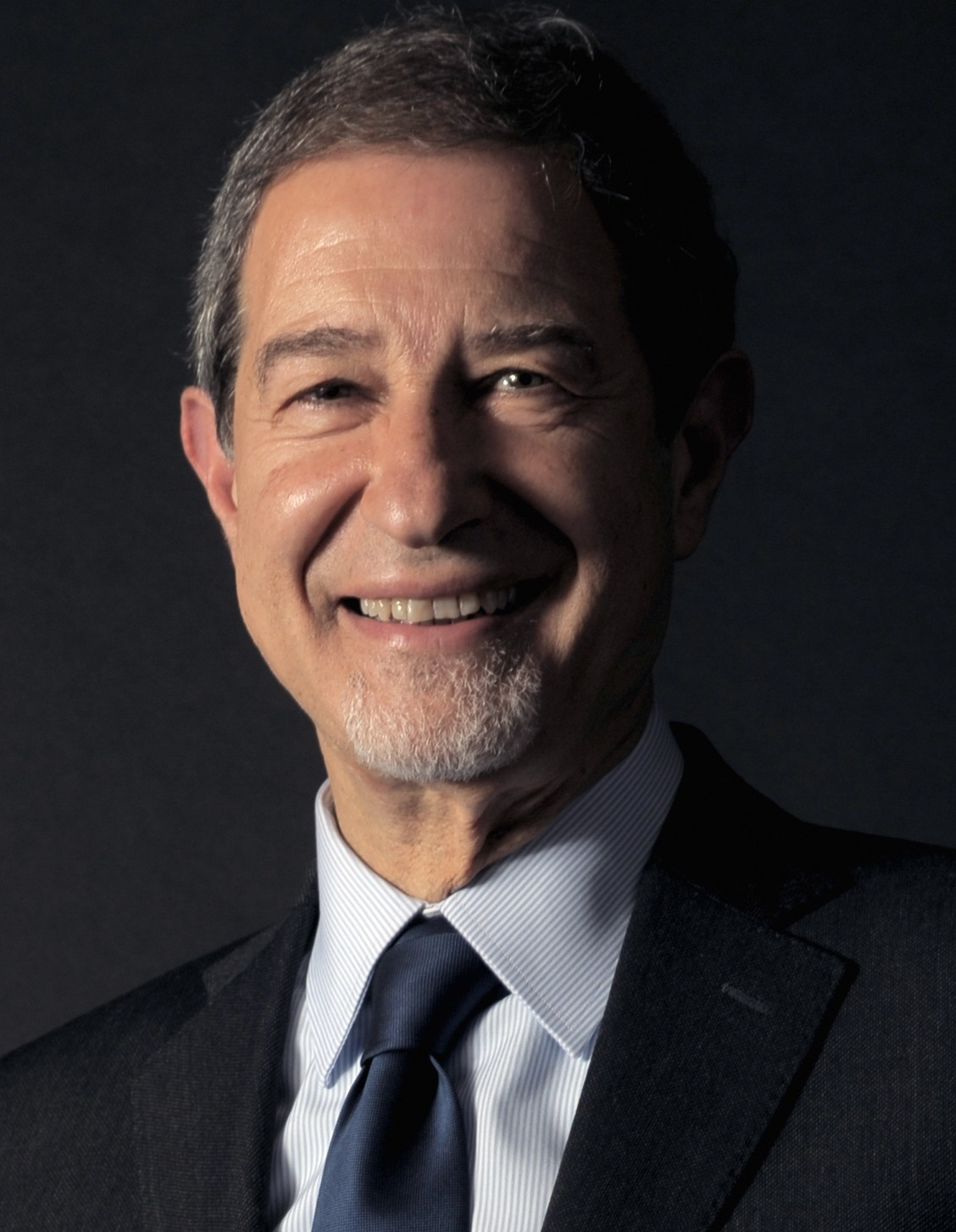

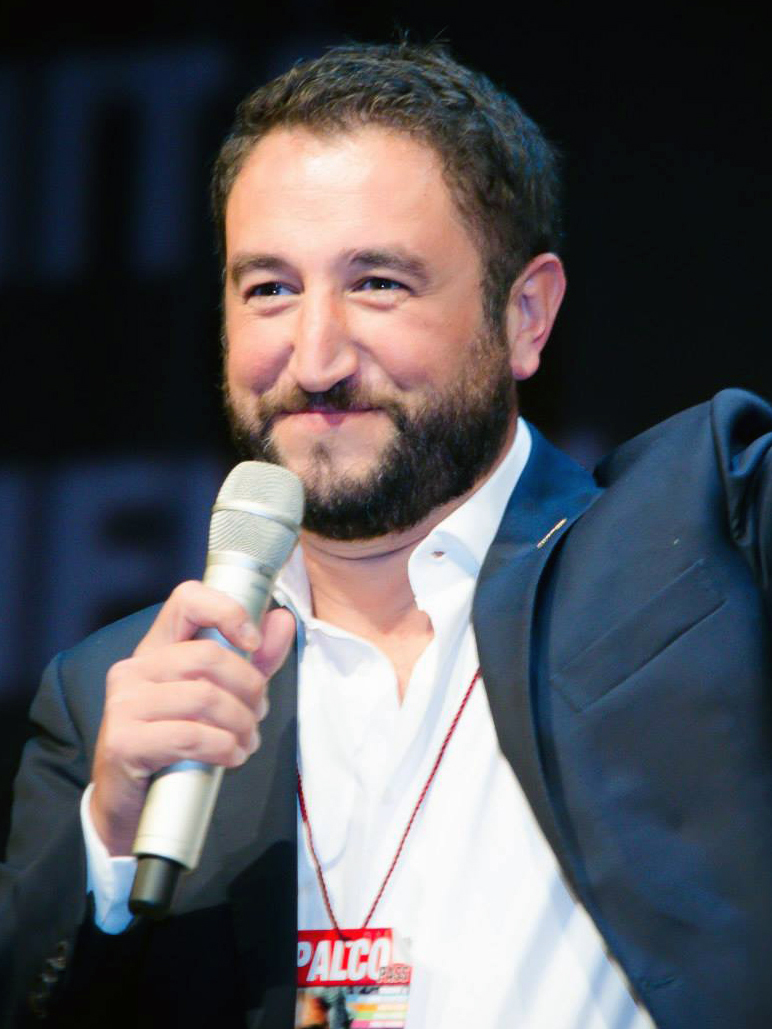

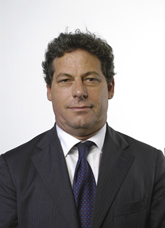
	First party	Second party
Leader	Rosario Crocetta	Nello Musumeci
Party	Democratic Party	The Right
Alliance	Centre-left	Centre-right
Seats won	39	21
Seat change	▲10	▼24
Popular vote	617,073	521,022
Percentage	30.47%	25.73%
Swing	▲0.9%	▼36.62%
	Third party	Fourth party
Leader	Giancarlo Cancelleri	Gianfranco Micciché
Party	Five Star Movement	Great South
Alliance		GS–PdS–FLI
Seats won	15	15
Seat change	▲15	Steady
Popular vote	368,006	312,112
Percentage	18.17%	15.41%
Swing	▲13.73%	new
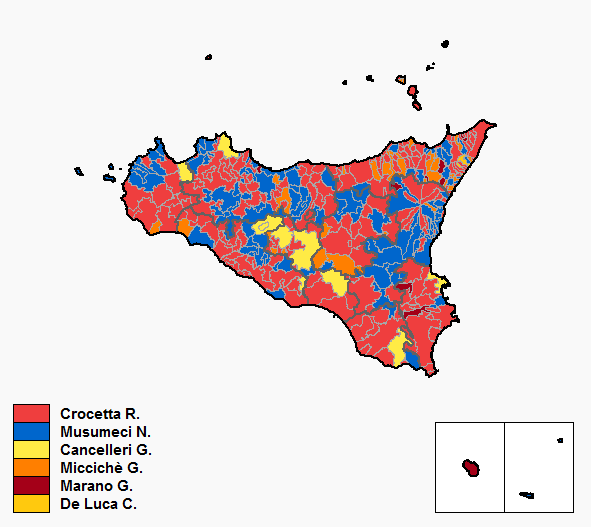
President before election
Raffaele Lombardo
MpA
Elected President
Rosario Crocetta
PD

The 2012 Sicilian regional election for the renewal of the Sicilian Regional Assembly and the election of the President of Sicily was held on 28 October 2012. It was a snap election, following the resignation of President Raffaele Lombardo for judicial and financial reasons.

The election was competed by ten candidates from newly reshuffled political alliances, and was an unusually close race. The winner of the election was Rosario Crocetta, candidate for a centre-left coalition of Democratic Party and the Union of the Centre.

== Candidates ==
- Nello Musumeci: a long-time Member of European Parliament and former 2006 election candidate, heads a "regular" centre-right coalition formed by The People of Freedom (PdL) and The Right (LD), the latter being the party of Musumeci;
- Gianfranco Micciché: a former minister for Development, deputy minister for Economy and - most recently - state undersecretary in several cabinets of Silvio Berlusconi, will lead a Sicilianist (pro-autonomy) coalition formed by Raffaele Lombardo's Movement for the Autonomies (MpA), renamed Party of Sicilians for the occasion, Micciché's own party Great South (GS), and the regional section of Future and Freedom (FLI).
- Rosario Crocetta: Member of European Parliament and former Mayor of Gela, will be the candidate of a moderate centre-left coalition formed by Crocetta's Democratic Party (PD) and the Union of the Centre (UdC);
- Giovanna Marano: a Sicilian trade union leader, leads a left-wing coalition made of Left Ecology Freedom (SEL), Italy of Values (IdV), the Federation of the Left (FdS) and the Federation of the Greens (FdV). She was put in place of original candidate Claudio Fava after the latter failed to move his residence to Sicily in time;
- Giancarlo Cancellieri: leading member candidate for the Sicilian wing of Beppe Grillo's Five Star Movement (M5S). His candidacy was extensively supported by Grillo himself, who reached the island swimming across the Strait of Messina and then campaigned consecutively through the island for the last two weeks of electoral campaign;
- Mariano Ferro: a leading member and figurehead of the 2012 Sicilian protests, runs as a candidate for the Pitchforks Movement;
- Cateno De Luca: a former Movement for the Autonomies member and outgoing Sicilian MP, runs as a candidate for his own movement Sicilian Revolution.
- Giacomo Di Leo: candidate for Workers' Communist Party (PCL);
- Gaspare Sturzo: a descendant of Italian People's Party founder Luigi Sturzo, runs as an independent candidate for "Sturzo Presidente" (Sturzo President);
- Lucia Pinsone: independent candidate for "Volontari per l'Italia" (Volunteers for Italy).

== Electoral system ==
The Sicilian Parliament is elected with a mixed system: 80 MPs are chosen with a form of proportional representation using a largest remainder method with open lists and a 5% threshold, while 10 MPs are elected with a block voting system with closed lists.

AG	CL	CT	EN	ME	PA	RG	SR	TP	total
7	4	17	3	11	20	5	6	7	80

== Results ==
28 October 2012 Sicilian regional election results
Candidates	Votes	%	Seats	Parties	Votes	%	Seats
Rosario Crocetta	617,073	30.47	9				
Rosario Crocetta	617,073	30.47	9	Democratic Party	257,274	13.42	14
Rosario Crocetta	617,073	30.47	9	Union of the Centre	207,827	10.84	11
Rosario Crocetta	617,073	30.47	9	Crocetta for President (incl. ApI and PSI)	118,346	6.17	5
Rosario Crocetta	617,073	30.47	9	Democratic Union for Consumers	100	0.00	–
Rosario Crocetta	617,073	30.47	9	Total	583,547	30.43	30
Nello Musumeci	521,022	25.73	1				
Nello Musumeci	521,022	25.73	1	The People of Freedom	247,351	12.91	12
Nello Musumeci	521,022	25.73	1	Cantiere Popolare	112,169	5.85	4
Nello Musumeci	521,022	25.73	1	Musumeci List (incl. The Right)	107,397	5.60	4
Nello Musumeci	521,022	25.73	1	Alliance of the Centre (incl. PSDI and MRN)	5,017	0.26	–
Nello Musumeci	521,022	25.73	1	Total	471,934	24.62	20
Giancarlo Cancelleri	368,006	18.17	–	Five Star Movement	285,202	14.88	15
Gianfranco Micciché	312,112	15.41	–				
Gianfranco Micciché	312,112	15.41	–	Party of Sicilians	182,737	9.53	10
Gianfranco Micciché	312,112	15.41	–	Great South	115,444	6.02	5
Gianfranco Micciché	312,112	15.41	–	Future and Freedom	83,891	4.37	–
Gianfranco Micciché	312,112	15.41	–	Thought and Action Party	959	0.05	–
Gianfranco Micciché	312,112	15.41	–	Total	383,031	19.97	15
Giovanna Marano	112,633	6.10	–				
Giovanna Marano	112,633	6.10	–	Italy of Values	67,738	3.53	–
Giovanna Marano	112,633	6.10	–	Left Ecology Freedom – Federation of the Left – Greens	58,753	3.06	–
Giovanna Marano	112,633	6.10	–	Total	126,491	6.59	–
Mariano Ferro	31,390	1.55	–	The People of Pitchforks (incl. FN)	23,965	1.20	–
Cateno De Luca	25,058	1.23	–	Sicilian Revolution (incl. Sicilia Vera)	23,966	1.20	–
Gaspare Sturzo	19,248	0.95	–	Sturzo for President	14,929	0.77	–
Giacomo Di Leo	4,495	0.22	–	Workers' Communist Party	2,031	0.10	–
Lucia Pinsone	3,659	0.18	–	Volunteers for Italy	2,278	0.11	–
Total candidates	2,024,696	100.00	10	Total parties	1,915,830	100.00	80
Source: Sicilian Region

Popular vote
M5S	14.88%
PD	13.42%
PdL	12.91%
UDC	10.84%
PdS	9.53%
Megafono	6.17%
GS	6.02%
CP	5.85%
LM	5.60%
FLI	4.37%
IdV	3.53%
SEL–FdS–FdV	3.06%

President
Crocetta	30.47%
Musumeci	25.73%
Cancelleri	18.17%
Micciché	15.41%
Marano	6.10%

== Aftermath ==
Following the result of the election, Crocetta was elected as president of Sicily, which turned out to be surprising in what was considered the strongest conservative stronghold of Italy. As he did not have a full majority in the Sicilian assembly, Crocetta decided to form a minority government with the support of the Five Star Movement in a number of shared legislative acts.
