= Maurizio Valenzi =

Italian politician (1909–2009)

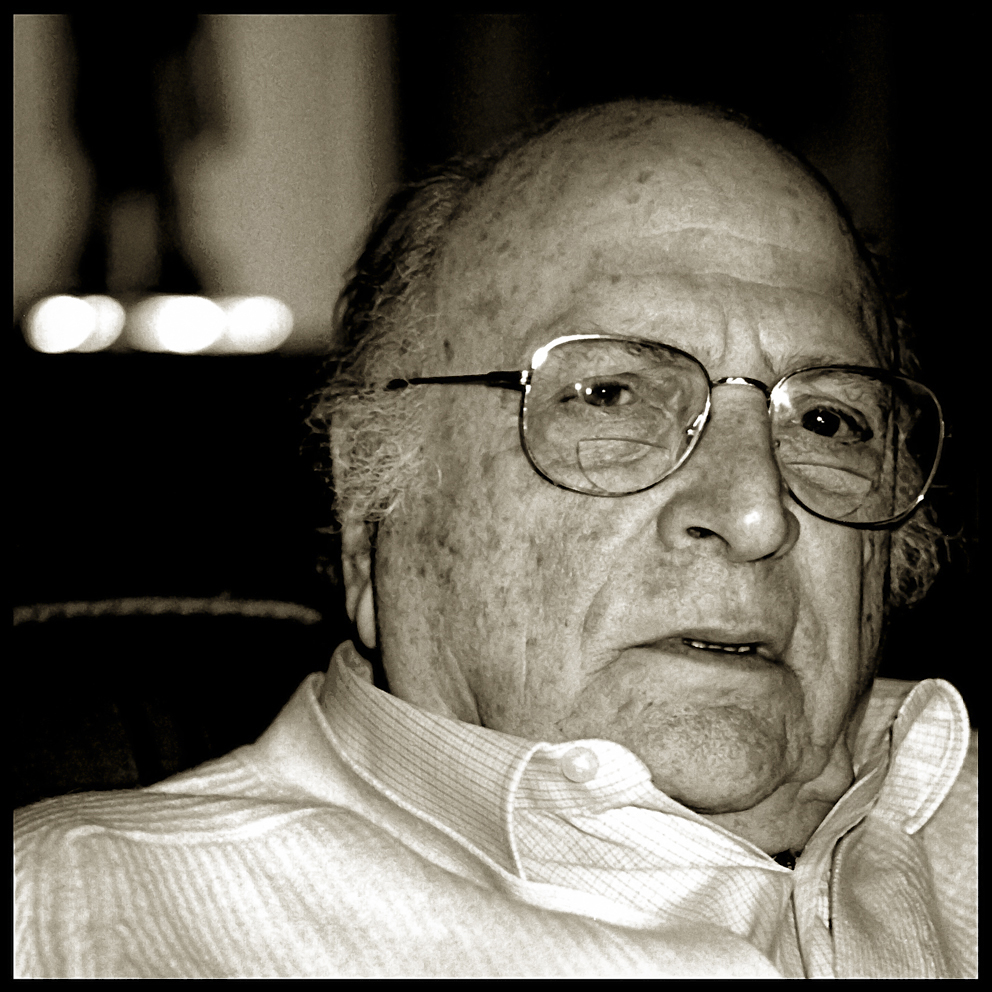

Mayor of Naples
- In office 27 September 1975 – 16 April 1983
- Preceded by: Bruno Milanesi
- Succeeded by: Francesco Picardi

Member of the Senate
- In office 25 June 1953 – 4 June 1968

Member of the European Parliament
- In office 17 June 1984 – 18 June 1989

Personal details
- Born: Maurizio Valensi; 16 November 1909 Tunis, Tunisia
- Died: 23 June 2009 (aged 99) Acerra, Italy
- Party: Italian Communist Party
- Occupation: Politician

Maurizio Valenzi (16 November 1909 – 23 June 2009) was an Italian politician. He was mayor of Naples from 1975 to 1983.

== Biography ==
Valenzi has been one of the main characters of the anti-fascist resistance in Europe. His real surname was actually "Valensi", but was accidentally mistaken as "Valenzi" by an employee of the town hall of Naples in 1944.

Between 1935 and 1936, he joined a group of Italians at the Tunisian Communist Party. In 1937, at the time of the Popular Front government, he was in Paris, and supported the connection between the Tunisian communist group and the Foreign Center of the Italian Communist Party.

In November 1941, Valenzi was arrested and tortured with electricity: he resisted interrogation and was sentenced to life imprisonment and forced labor by the Fascist regime of Vichy and interned for a year in Algeria. He was freed by the Allies in March 1943 and was sent by the PCI to Naples, in order to prepare the arrival of Palmiro Togliatti from the Soviet Union.

After the end of the war, Valenzi was elected Senator with the PCI and held his seat from 1953 to 1968. He was a city councilor in Naples from 1970 until his election as Mayor in 1975. He led the city in the difficult times of terrorism and the Irpinia earthquake, although he was also responsible for overseeing a visit by Queen Elizabeth II to the city.

In 1984 he was elected to the European Parliament, in which he remained in office until 1989.

He died in Acerra, in the "Villa dei Fiori" clinic, where he was hospitalized for days, on 23 June 2009, a few months before his 100th birthday.
