= The Megaphone – Crocetta List =

The Megaphone – Lista Crocetta Il Megafono – Lista Crocetta
- Leader: Rosario Crocetta
- Founded: 2012
- Dissolved: 2017
- Headquarters: Palermo
- Ideology: Regionalism; Social democracy
- Political position: Centre-left
- National affiliation: with Democratic Party

The Megaphone – Crocetta List (Italian: Il Megafono – Lista Crocetta) was a regional centre-left political party active in Sicily, Italy. The party was led by Rosario Crocetta, the former President of Sicily, also affiliated to the Democratic Party.

== History ==
In the 2012 Sicilian regional election the party won 6.2% of the vote and 5 seats in the Sicilian Regional Assembly.

In the 2013 Italian general election the party filed a list only for the Senate in Sicily as part of the centre-left coalition Italy. Common Good, garnered 6.2% of the vote in the region and had one senator, Giuseppe Lumia, elected.

== Electoral results ==
=== Senate of the Republic ===
Election	Votes	%	Seats	+/–	Leader
2013	138,581 (#12)	0.5	1 / 315	New	Rosario Crocetta

=== Sicilian Regional Assembly ===
Election	Votes	%	Seats	+/–	Leader
2012	118,346 (#6)	6.2	5 / 90	New	Rosario Crocetta
2017	42,189 (with MP)	2.2	0 / 70	▼5	Rosario Crocetta
