= Valeria Valente =

Italian politician and lawyer

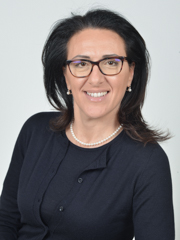
- Valeria Valente

Member of the Senate of the Republic
- In office 21 March 2013 – 22 March 2018
- Constituency: Campania

Personal details
- Born: 16 September 1976 (age 49) Naples, Italy
- Party: Democratic Party
- Occupation: Politician, lawyer

Valeria Valente (born 16 September 1976) is an Italian politician and lawyer. Valente is a member of the Democratic Party. She was born in Naples, Italy in 1976. When she was very young she was active in the politics of the student movement. At 18 she became the coordinator for the city of Naples and a year later joined the National Union of Students, so she moved to Rome to continue her political career. In 2016 she announced her candidacy for the Democratic Party (DP) Primaries for the office of Mayor of Naples.

In 2011 she became the coordinator of the democratic women of Campania. In December 2012 she took part in the Democratic Party primaries, and in February 2013, she was elected deputy in the Campania I constituency. She studied in the University of Naples Federico II where she earned a degree in law. Valente, who grew up in Bassolino's political area at the time of the councillorship in the Iervolino joints, was supported by all the notables of the local party in a key contrast with the former mayor. Valente joined the municipal council as Democratic Party leader, collecting 21% of the votes, finishing third behind Gianni Lettieri and outgoing mayor Luigi De Magistris, who was re-elected on the 19 June ballot. She is married and has children.
