= Force of the South =

Defunct Italian political party

Force of the South Forza del Sud
- Secretary: Gianfranco Micciché
- Founded: 30 October 2010
- Dissolved: 5 September 2011
- Split from: The People of Freedom
- Succeeded by: Great South
- Ideology: Regionalism; Federalism; Christian democracy Conservatism

Website
- http://www.forzadelsud.it/

Force of the South (Italian: Forza del Sud, FdS) was a liberal-conservative political party in Italy based in Sicily.

In September 2010, after years of weighting, Gianfranco Micciché, long-time leader of Forza Italia and, later, The People of Freedom (PdL) in Sicily and Under-Secretary in the Berlusconi IV Cabinet, announced his exit from the PdL and his intention to launch a "Sicilian people's party", which would have then merged with other southern "people's parties" to form the "Party of the South". In October 2010 Force of the South was launched. Only five out of 16 regional deputies of the PdL–Sicily, the faction of the PdL led by Micciché, followed their leader into the new party.

The party was officially launched during a convention in Palermo on 30 October 2010, which was attended also by Stefania Prestigiacomo, who, although very supportive of Micciché, chose to stay in the PdL. In that occasion Micciché announced that some 25 deputies and senators were ready to join FdS. Finally only ten have managed to do so: they include seven deputies (Giuseppe Fallica, Ugo Grimaldi, Maurizio Iapicca, Gianfranco Micciché, Antonino Minardo, Francesco Stagno D'Alcontres and Giacomo Terranova) and three senators (Roberto Centaro, Mario Ferrara and Salvo Fleres), all elected in Sicily.

FdS soon broadened its scope throughout the South. In May 2011 the party had promising results in Naples (5.2%) and Reggio Calabria (4.7%), while in October it gained 6.5% of the vote in a regional election in Molise.

On 14 July 2011 FdS launched, along with We the South and I the South, the Federation of the South, later Great South, a coalition which aimed at becoming the party of the South. In January 2012 FdS formed a sub-group in the Mixed Group of the Chamber of Deputies, which included the seven FdS deputies and two new entries (Aurelio Misiti, a former member of Italy of Values who was appointed chairman, and Gerardo Soglia, from the PdL), but not the three deputies of NS.

In October 2012, the balance of accounts of the People of Freedom showed that the Force of the South had received €300,000 of financial support from PdL.
