= Emiddio Novi =

Italian journalist and politician (1946–2018)

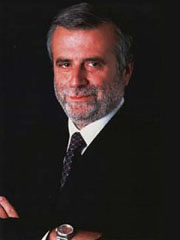
- Emiddio Novi

Member of the Chamber of Deputies
- In office 1994–1996

Member of the Senate
- In office 1996–2008

Member of the Naples City Council

Personal details
- Born: 1 January 1946 Sant'Agata di Puglia, Italy
- Died: 24 August 2018 (aged 72) Sant'Agata di Puglia, Italy
- Party: Forza Italia
- Occupation: Journalist, politician

Emiddio Novi (1 January 1946 – 24 August 2018) was an Italian journalist and politician.

Novi was born in Sant'Agata di Puglia and later moved to Naples, where he served as editor of the Giornale di Napoli. He served in the Chamber of Deputies from 1994 to 1996 for Forza Italia after the Italian Socialist Party had disbanded, then unsuccessfully contested the mayoralty of Naples in 1997, while he sat in the Senate. He served as senator until 2008, and was a member of Naples City Council until 2001. Novi died in a traffic collision in his hometown of Sant'Agata di Puglia on 24 August 2018.
