= Francesco Picardi =

Italian politician

Francesco Picardi (28 November 1928 in Naples – 12 February 2012 in Naples) was an Italian politician famous for being the mayor of Naples for only 100 days. Picardi, who represented the centre-left Italian Democratic Socialist Party (Partito Socialista Democratico Italiano; PSDI), was the first mayor of Naples following the end of communist rule in 1984.
