= Gianfranco Miccichè =

Italian politician (born 1954)

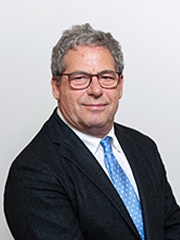

Member of the Senate of the Republic
- In office 13 October 2022 – 18 January 2023
- Succeeded by: Daniela Ternullo
- Constituency: Sicily

Member of the Chamber of Deputies
- In office 15 April 1994 – 26 September 2006
- Constituency: Sicily 3 (1994, 1996, 2001); Calabria (2006)
- In office 28 April 2008 – 14 March 2013
- Constituency: Sicily 3

Minister for Development and Territorial Cohesion
- In office 23 April 2005 – 17 May 2006
- Prime Minister: Silvio Berlusconi
- Preceded by: Office established
- Succeeded by: Raffaele Fitto (since 2008)

Member of the European Parliament
- In office 19 July 2018 – 4 September 2018
- Constituency: Italian Islands

Personal details
- Born: 1 April 1954 (age 72) Palermo, Italy
- Party: LC (1969–1976); FI (1994–2009); PdL (2009–2010); FdS (2010–2011); GS (2011–2013); FI (2013–2024); MpA (since 2024)

Gianfranco Miccichè (born 1 April 1954) is an Italian politician.

== Biography ==
Miccichè was born into a wealthy family of Palermo, in the Sicily region. He was business executive at the IRFIS company for eleven years. In 1984, thanks to the knowledge of Marcello Dell'Utri, he became executive of Publitalia '80, a company led by Silvio Berlusconi. In 1993, together with other men of Publitalia '80, he joined Forza Italia, of which he was appointed regional coordinator in Sicily.

In the 1994 Italian general election, Miccichè was elected for the first time in the Chamber of Deputies and served as Undersecretary at the Ministry of Transport and Navigation in the first Berlusconi government. At the 1997 Italian local elections, he was candidate as mayor of Palermo for the Pole for Freedoms but was defeated by Leoluca Orlando of the centre-left coalition. In 2001, he served as Vice-Minister of Economy and Finance in the second Berlusconi government. In 2005, he was appointed Minister for Development and Territorial Cohesion in the third Berlusconi government.

In the 2006 Sicilian regional election, Miccichè was elected in the Sicilian Regional Assembly, of which he was appointed president. In the 2008 Italian general election, he was re-elected to the Chamber of Deputies. On 12 May 2008, the Council of Ministers appointed Miccichè as Undersecretary of State with responsibility for CIPE (Interministerial Committee for Economic Planning). In 2010, Miccichè left The People of Freedom to found his own party, Force of the South, which in 2011 changed name into Great South. At the 2012 Sicilian regional election, he was candidate as president of Sicily and gained the 15.41% of the votes, thus contributing to the defeat of the centre-right coalition candidate Nello Musumeci and to the victory of the candidate of the centre-left Rosario Crocetta.

In the 2013 Italian general election, Miccichè was candidate for the Senate of the Republic with Great South but was not elected. Subsequently, he was appointed as Undersecretary of State for Public Administration and Simplification in the Letta government but resigned in August 2013 after that the Supreme Court of Cassation notified the condemnation of Berlusconi. In November 2013, he joined the new Forza Italia. In the 2014 European Parliament election in Italy, Miccichè was candidate with Forza Italia but was not elected, being the first of the unelected. He entered in the European Parliament in 2018 when Salvo Pogliese was elected mayor of Catania, allowing Miccichè to take over his seat. In the 2017 Sicilian regional election, he was elected to the Sicilian Regional Assembly. On 16 December 2017, he was elected president of the Sicilian Regional Assembly.

On 19 July 2018, Miccichè became an MEP to replace Pogliese, who had resigned after being elected mayor of Catania. Despite the double mandate, he did not resign as an MEP until the Supreme Court of Cassation declared him lapsed on 4 September 2018 due to incompatibility with his role as regional deputy. Innocenzo Leontini took his place in the European Parliament. Based on a 2023 investigation, Micciché was seen buying cocaine from his auto blu, chauffeur driven car paid by the taxpayers; he was not prosecuted as he was only a consumer.
