= Province of Naples =

Former province of Campania, Italy

Coordinates: 40°50′N 14°15′E

- Province (1806–2014)
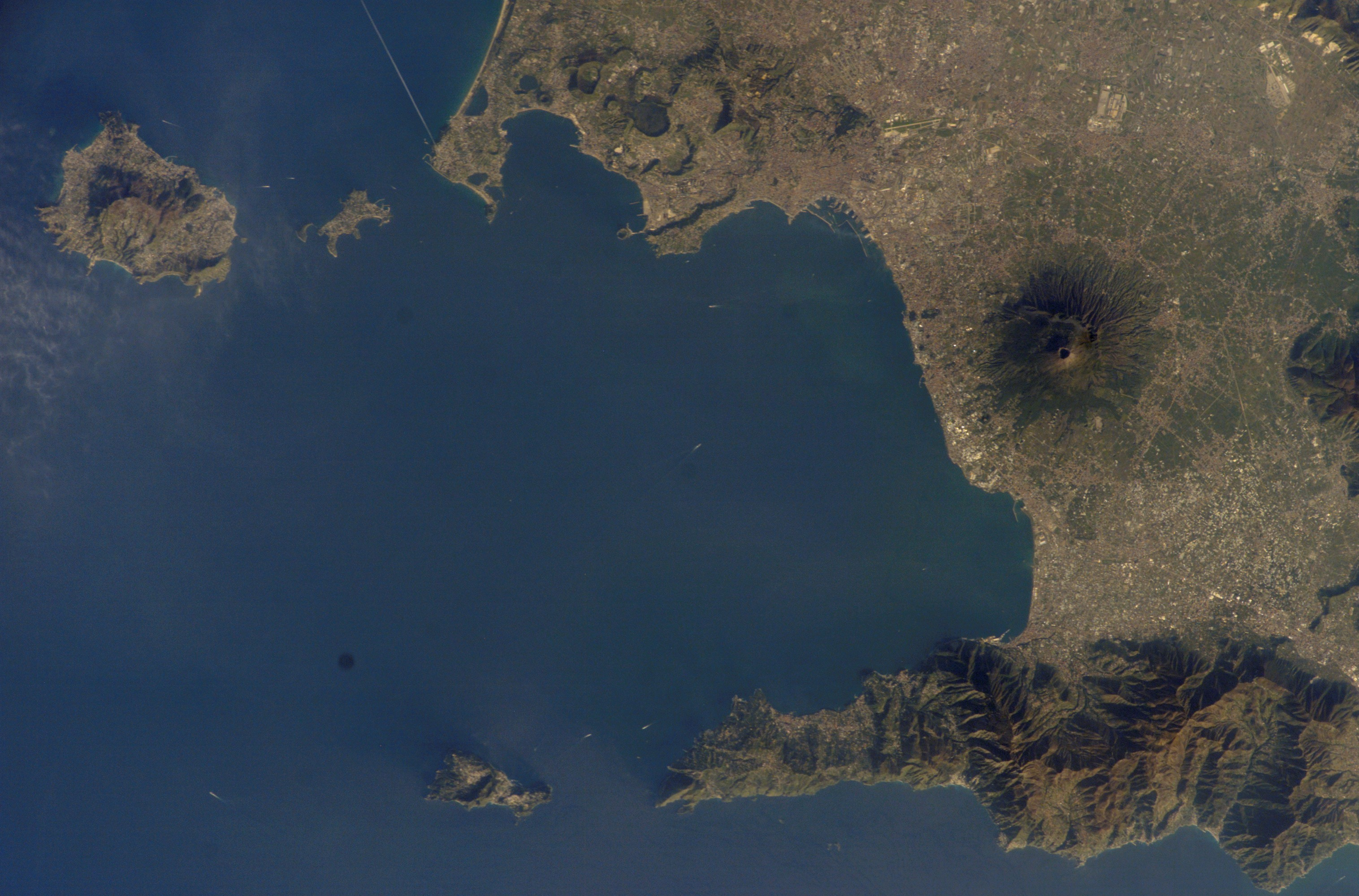
- Satellite view of the provincial area

- Flag Coat of arms

- Map highlighting the location of the province of Naples in Italy
- Country: Italy
- Region: Campania
- Capital(s): Naples
- Comuni: 92

Area
  - Total: 1,171.13 km^{2} (452.18 sq mi)

Population (30 November 2012)
  - Total: 3,052,763
  - Density: 2,606.68/km^{2} (6,751.27/sq mi)
- Time zone: UTC+1 (CET)
  - Summer (DST): UTC+2 (CEST)
- Postal code: 80121–80147 (cap); 80010–80079 (rest)
- Telephone prefix: 081
- Vehicle registration: NA
- ISTAT: 063

The province of Naples (Italian: provincia di Napoli; Neapolitan: pruvincia 'e Nàpule) was a province in the Campania region of Italy.

In 2014/2015, the reform of local authorities (Law 142/1990 and Law 56/2014), replaced the province of Naples with the Metropolitan City of Naples.

== Demographics ==
The province of Naples is the most densely populated in Italy. At the 2013 census were all located in the province, as were 10 of the top 15. It has an area of 1,171.13 km^{2}, and a total population of about 3.05 million.

Largest comuni (municipalities) in the Naples metropolitan area:

Largest communities 2013 estimate
City	Population
Naples	959,052
Giugliano in Campania	110,473
Torre del Greco	85,382
Pozzuoli	80,812
Casoria	78,229
Castellammare di Stabia	65,529
Afragola	63,674
Marano di Napoli	57,200
Portici	55,310
Ercolano	53,260

== See also ==
- Metropolitan City of Naples
