= Danilo Restivo =

Italian convicted murderer (born 1972)

- Born: 3 April 1972 (age 54); Erice, Trapani, Sicily, Italy
- Other name: The Hairdresser of Potenza
- Occupation: Unemployed
- Known for: Murder of Elisa Claps in 1993 and Heather Barnett in 2002
- Spouse: Fiamma Marsango (m. 2004)
- Status: Imprisoned
- Motive: Sexual gratification • Hair fetishism
- Criminal charge: Murder
- Penalty: Life imprisonment (whole life order, later reduced to a minimum term of 40 years on appeal)

Details
- Victims: 2 convicted, 8-9+ suspected
- Date: 12 September 1993 (murder of Elisa Claps); 12 November 2002 (murder of Heather Barnett)
- Span of crimes: 1993–2002
- Country: Italy, United Kingdom (confirmed); France, Spain (suspected)
- Locations: Potenza, Italy; Bournemouth, Dorset, England; Throop, Dorset; Hurn, Dorset
- Weapons: Hammer, knife or other sharp instrument
- Date apprehended: 19 May 2010
- Imprisoned at: HM Prison Full Sutton

Danilo Restivo (born 3 April 1972) is an Italian convicted murderer and suspected serial killer. Restivo is serving a life sentence with a 40-year tariff for murdering his neighbour Heather Barnett in Bournemouth, England, in November 2002.

Investigators' suspicions that Restivo had murdered Barnett were raised because of his alleged involvement in the 1993 disappearance of Elisa Claps in Potenza, Italy; he was not charged due to insufficient evidence. Subsequent to the 2010 discovery of Claps's body, Restivo was tried for the murder of Barnett, with evidence of similarities in ritualistic placing of hair on the bodies of Claps and Barnett being heard by the English court. He was found guilty of murdering Barnett, and later found guilty for murdering Claps by an Italian court. He is additionally suspected of committing at least six or seven further murders.

== Background ==
=== Danilo Restivo ===
Restivo was born in the town of Erice, in the province of Trapani, in Sicily, Italy. He then moved with his family to Cagliari, Sardinia; by the time he was 10, Restivo and his family had moved to Potenza, Basilicata, situated approximately 100 km (62 miles) east of Naples and 362 km (225 miles) south of Rome, containing high-rise apartments and factories. The move to the mainland was due to his father Maurizio's occupation as the Director of the National Library. He was well connected in the community and was considered an influential figure in Potenza. Although they were not particularly rich, the Restivo family were part of the "Potenza Bene" (Potenza's most powerful and influent families). Restivo's dream was to be admitted to the faculty of dentistry, something that he said he had promised to his grandmother on her deathbed.

Restivo was considered a "loner" and "strange", and was socially awkward. Restivo stated that it was normal for him to spend time on his own, where it gave him time to think. People were aware that he had a fetish for cutting girls' hair, a habit that mostly took place during bus rides and had gained him the nickname "il parrucchiere" ("the hairdresser") around the city. Restivo stated that the sight of blood upset him, where he had previously fainted because of it; however, later email exchanges evidenced an almost-sexual excitement that Restivo got from seeing blood. Restivo was known to police, who believed him to be responsible for nine incidents in which women had had their hair clandestinely cut.

Authorities in the United Kingdom later described Restivo as "a bit dippy, rather pathetic, slightly childish and very hypochondriac". He would attempt to arrange dates with girls by claiming to have a present for them. In 1986, Restivo tied up two children before cutting one with a knife. Restivo was not convicted of any offence for this incident, with Restivo's parents settling matters with the parents of the other children involved. In autumn 1992, Restivo was convicted of harassing four girls, who were living in a shared apartment opposite his family home in Potenza. Restivo could see them from his window and constantly harassed them by making threats, sending explicit letters and making regular phone calls to their house, playing the soundtrack of Deep Red (Profondo rosso), a giallo film about a serial killer who plays a melody before every murder, and Beethoven's Für Elise (commonly translated as Per Elisa in Italy), which was later considered as an early sign of his already ongoing and growing obsession with his first victim. It was reported that Restivo used this technique to harass those who rejected him.

=== Elisa Claps ===
Elisa Claps, the 16-year-old daughter of a tobacconist and a clerk, was a student in the third year of the liceo classico (the oldest public secondary school type in Italy) in Potenza, with ambitions to become a physician and work with Médecins Sans Frontières. Elisa was described as a "happy-go-lucky" teenager and the "pride and joy" of her mother and family. She was the youngest of three children and was described as very close to her family. Claps was a devout Catholic. Friends reported Claps felt sorry for Restivo, who appeared lonely and depressed. Claps's eldest brother, Gildo, who also knew Restivo, was aware that Restivo's advances towards her had "frustrated" his sister. Claps wrote several pages in her journal, complaining about his odd behaviour, and was aware of rumours regarding Restivo having a fetish for cutting hair.

A month before Claps disappeared, Claps was on holiday in Montegiordano, a village on the Ionian coast. While walking along, Claps squeezed her brother Gildo's arm, noticing that Restivo was in the same village. She recounted to her brother about having to meet Restivo on holiday, as well as having seen him back home. Asking her if there were issues, Claps told her brother that Restivo had been insistent with her previously. Restivo approached the siblings, turning to Claps and asking if she wanted to go for a walk. Claps's response was to squeeze her brother's arm, appearing to indicate she did not want to go with Restivo. Gildo told Restivo this, telling him to "please go away", with Restivo attempting to insist but went away, perhaps because of Gildo's firmness. Not liking how insistent Restivo had been with his sister, including how he looked at her, Gildo attempted to gain more information about him. Claps told him that it did not matter, with Restivo being a person who was always alone and that Gildo should let things go.

== Murder of Elisa Claps ==
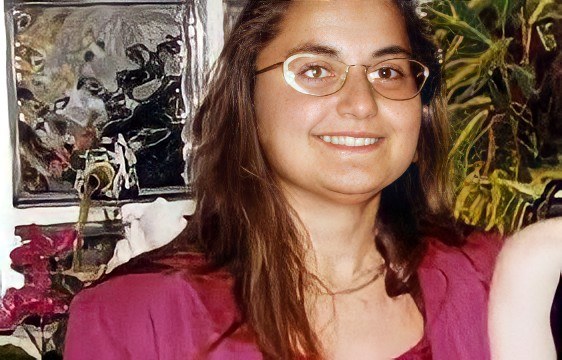
Undated photograph of Elisa Claps

=== Background ===
On 11 September 1993, the evening before she disappeared, Restivo rang Claps at approximately 17:00. Elisa's brother Gildo inadvertently overheard her speaking on the phone, perceiving Claps's tone as "very annoyed". No one then asked her the specifics of that interaction, nor who the caller was, as the girl appeared rather quiet and not particularly bothered after ending the call. Restivo had phoned and asked for a date, pretending he had a gift for Claps. On discovering that he had bought her a present for passing her retakes, Claps felt sorry for Restivo, agreeing to meet him at the 15th-century Chiesa della Santissima Trinità in the centre of the city the following day.

=== Meeting Restivo ===
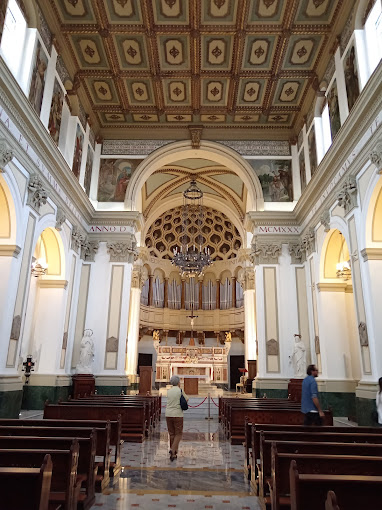
The interior of Santissima Trinità, Potenza

On 12 September, the day of her disappearance, Claps and her friend Eliana De Cillis left the Claps residence, with the plan for the pair to go to mass at the Chiesa della Trinità. Instead of going to mass, Claps met with Restivo. Claps felt bad for Restivo and despite being hesitant, Claps had "begged" her close friend De Cillis, to accompany her for support. They went to meet Restivo at the church, arriving at approximately 11:30 a.m., just as Mass had ended. When she did not return home, Claps' elder brother, Gildo, telephoned Restivo's family residence and was told that Restivo was out of town due to university tests and had no knowledge of Claps's whereabouts.

At lunch the day Claps disappeared at the Restivo family home, Giovanni Motta, the then-boyfriend of Restivo's sister, found that Restivo appeared "agitated", asking to be taken to the hospital. Motta noticed that Restivo was "very sweaty" and had a "hasty step", asking Motta to accompany him to hospital for a small cut between his first finger and thumb, measuring approximately a centimetre. Restivo told Motta that he had cut his hand falling over on an escalator. Giovanni stated that Restivo's jacket looked very dirty and soaked with blood. After returning from hospital, Motta noticed that Restivo had changed his clothes, that appeared soaked, despite it being a sunny day. Motta was unsure whether Restivo's clothes were wet from sweat or "another source". Meanwhile, when Gildo went to the church, he discovered the priest in charge, Domenico Sabia (known as Don Mimì), had suddenly left for some days, taking with him the only key giving access to the upper storey of the church building. Sabia later opposed police searching the church. After Claps had gone missing, Sabia closed the church and went on an extended retreat.

Gildo reported the disappearance of his sister to police but was initially told the matter had "no urgency". When a policeman questioned him, Restivo fell into a near-hysterical state, then admitted that he and Claps had spent some time together discussing the girl he had fallen in love with. Motta later told the police that Restivo had looked terrified about that little cut on his hand and had insisted on being accompanied to the emergency room. In a statement to the police on 13 September 1993, the day after Claps disappeared, Restivo stated that he had met her at the church during the morning of 12 September, talked with her for around "15 minutes", then saw her out, while he stayed for another 10 minutes to pray. Later that day, he said he had gone to Naples, where he was a freshman at the Faculty of Dentistry. Restivo claimed to have hurt his hand while taking a short-cut through a building site, falling down some steps. This resulted in a piece of sheet metal becoming stuck in his hand, causing it to bleed.

On 21 September, when providing a further statement to the office of the public prosecutor, Restivo claimed that Claps had left the church and prior to leaving, told him that she was supposed to be at her family's countryside home by 12 noon. In the 21 September interview, Restivo said "there's nothing I can say about Elisa's disappearance". Upon speaking to a television reporter, he stated that Claps had seemed frightened and had confided to him that she "had been harassed by a boy before entering the church". Restivo claimed that earlier that year Claps had rejected his romantic advances and he had later confided in her about "problems he was having with another girl". The Restivo family declined the policeman's request for clothes Restivo had worn on that Sunday morning.

=== Conspiracy-theorising and false leads ===
Claps' disappearance was the subject of intense media interest and speculation; it was reported that the Claps case was the Italian journalist's version of British missing person cases, such as those of Madeline McCann and Suzy Lamplugh. The assumption that Claps had subsequently left the church moved the focus of the investigation away from the church building and onto other lines of inquiry; the church was not thoroughly searched.

Claps' close friend who had accompanied her on the day of her disappearance told investigators that she had last seen Claps outside the church at 11:30 a.m., at which point Claps had departed to meet Restivo in the church. She claimed Claps had told her she would be back in half an hour. Prosecutors accused her of lying and suspected her of involvement in the disappearance; they asserted that she had been seen with Claps later in the day. The young woman, just sixteen years old at the time, later confided to several friends that she had been worried that she could have met the same fate as Claps if she had been with her. An acquaintance of Claps said that she had been abducted by criminals. Claps' diary had a page missing; tests suggested that there were words written in Albanian. A connection to Albania was thought by some to be the most promising line of inquiry, with Claps having been sold into prostitution. Police also suggested Claps could have run away with her boyfriend or something similar. There was talk of Claps being seen in a white Fiat Uno in either Rome or Potenza. Suspicious deaths of people with small links to the case occurred, with three people dying in car crashes.

Claps' elder brother, Gildo, alleged that the investigation into his sister's disappearance had been hindered by deference to prominent community figures. The investigation was taken away from the Potenza authorities and moved 120 km away to Salerno. In 2012, Tobias Jones wrote: "The case gradually became, for many, an obsession, one of the iconic Italian mysteries that enabled people to engage in dietrologia, literally 'behindery' or conspiracy-theorising. Claps' face—her long, dark hair, thick glasses and carefree smile—haunted the nation."

=== Trial ===
In June 1994, a magistrate refused to issue an arrest warrant for Restivo for giving false information; four months later, he was taken into custody. An Italian policeman who questioned Restivo described him as "cunning" and "precise in his answers". Awaiting trial for perjury in 1994, Restivo was held in solitary confinement for thirty-seven days, stating how he was "physically and psychologically abused". In 1995, asked about whether Claps was bothered by his persistence, Restivo stated: "I don't know, I never noticed. I never persisted, in July (1993) she said 'no' full stop; we remained friends." He added that it was Claps who had invited him into the church, while he had wanted to talk to her outside.

In 1996, Restivo was tried for giving false information. He testified that he had met Claps in a curtained area behind the altar before she left minutes later. Tried along with Restivo were an Albanian man and Claps' close friend. Restivo alone was convicted, he was sentenced to 20 months imprisonment and lost an appeal. Because short sentences are suspended in Italy, Restivo remained free and without restriction on his movements. The prosecution appealed the acquittal of Claps' friend, and at a second trial she was found guilty on a charge of perjury and sentenced to 14 months' imprisonment; Italy's Supreme Court of Cassation later overturned the conviction. (Note: According to Italian law and its justice system, which has three degrees of judgment and follows the "presumption of innocence" principle, a defendant is "not guilty" until the sentence "becomes final" (cosa giudicata) and is no longer appealable (res judicata). A defendant has the right to all three levels of judgment (Tribunal, Court of Appeal, and Supreme Court of Cassation) and to advance on any level a request for a constitutional complaint. They also have the right to go to supranational courts, such as the Court of Justice of the European Union and the European Court of Human Rights, to stand up for their reasons. The defence's task is not necessarily to prove the innocence of their client but rather simply to present evidence favourable to the defendant; the burden of proof falls on the prosecution, which must prove their case "beyond a reasonable doubt", a standard that was only adopted in 1988 with the reform of the Italian Code of Criminal Procedure (1989), which can be considered to be somewhere in between the inquisitorial system and the adversarial system. The goal of the Italian judge (giudice) is to reach the truth, or legal/procedural truth (verità processuale), and in this there are similarities with the historian. The goal of the Italian public prosecutor (pubblico ministero) is not simply to prove an accusation but also to reach the truth; for example, the public prosecutor's goal include ascertaining facts and circumstances that could exonerate the suspect (e.g. providing exculpatory evidence to the defence). As part of the Italian Code of Criminal Procedure, the accused is thus presumed innocent, and both the defendant and the prosecution can appeal a court's judgment. An appeal triggers what is essentially a trial de novo, in which all evidence and witnesses can be re-examined. A further appeal can be made to the Supreme Court of Cassation but only on procedural grounds or on issues of the interpretation of law. For an overview of the Italian Code of Criminal Procedure (before and after 1988) and the working of criminal trials as well as the presumption of innocence in Italy, see: Mencarelli, Franco (1981). "Processo penale". Enciclopedia Italiana (in Italian). Vol. IV Appendice. Rome: Italian Encyclopedia Institute.; Ghisalberti, Carlo (1994). "Processo penale". Enciclopedia Italiana (in Italian). Vol. V Appendice. Rome: Italian Encyclopedia Institute.; Pisani, Mario; et al. (2006). Manuale di procedura penale (in Italian). Bologna: Monduzzi Editore. ISBN 88-323-6109-4.; "Azione. Diritto processuale penale". Treccani (in Italian). 2013.; "Presunzione di non colpevolezza". Treccani (in Italian). 2013.; "Processo penale". Treccani (in Italian). 2014.; Deidda, Beniamino (April 2018). "L'esperienza di un giudice che ha 'spiegato' il dispositivo della sentenza". Questione Giustizia (in Italian). No. 309. ISSN 2420-952X.; For an overview of the role of the judge and public prosecutor in Italy, see: Maria, Luca Santa (1 March 2017). "La verità" (PDF). Diritto Penale Contemporaneo (in Italian). ISSN 2240-7618.; Continiello, Alessandro; D'Alberti, Ludovica (8 May 2018). "Indagini del Pm a favore dell'indagato, da rendere obbligatorie?". Diritto.it (in Italian).; Bogna, Paolo (9 October 2019). "Verità storica e verità processuale *". Questione Giustizia (in Italian). ISSN 2420-952X.; Giostra, Glauco (19 July 2023). "Giustizia e verità *". Questione Giustizia (in Italian). ISSN 2420-952X.; Bruti Liberati, Edmondo (20 April 2024). "L'imparzialità del pubblico ministero". Questione Giustizia (in Italian). No. 1–2. ISSN 2420-952X.; "Pubblico ministero: il suo unico obiettivo è la ricerca della verità". Cultura e Sviluppo (in Italian). 6 August 2024.; For how criminal trials work in Italy (e.g. Amanda Knox's trial), see: Vogt, Andrea (14 December 2009). "The debate continues over Knox's guilt". Seattle Post-Intelligencer. ISSN 0745-970X. Archived from the original on 29 November 2023. "For historical and political reasons unique to Italy, the country has a justice system with an extraordinary number of protections for the accused, more than many other European nations. ... The presumption of innocence is so strong in Italy that under criminal procedural law, [the defendant] is still not considered ... convicted ... and won't be until ... found guilty through all phases of the process: Court of Assize [or Tribunal] ... the Appellate Court of Assize [or Court of Appeal]; and the [Supreme] Court of Cassation. 'In Italy there is a presumption of innocence until there is a definitive conviction,' [Stefania] Carnevale [an assistant professor of criminal procedural law and prisoner's rights at the University of Ferrara] said."; Povoledo, Elisabetta (3 October 2011). "Amanda Knox Freed After Appeal in Italian Court". The New York Times. ISSN 1553-8095. Archived from the original on 4 October 2011. "Italian legal experts dismissed such accusations [of a medieval or barbaric legal system]. The Knox case, if anything, exemplified the guarantees implicit in the judicial system, 'because the appeals process evaluates both procedural questions and can reopen the investigative phase, which is what happened here,' said Maurizio Bellacosa, a defense lawyer and professor of penal law at the Luiss University in Rome. 'It is a guarantee for defendants.' Giuliano Mignini, the prosecutor who led the murder investigation, said Monday that he would appeal the sentence to Italy's Supreme Court. The judge will have 90 days to write a report on the court's conclusions, and parties then have 45 days to file an appeal. The court usually takes a year to hear a case. Should they decide to overturn the acquittal, Ms. Knox would be tried — even in absentia — in a second appeals court, and if that court upheld the conviction it would return to the Supreme Court. Only when a final conviction was reached could Italy start extradition procedures against her.") After this trial, Restivo left Italy and moved to the United Kingdom.

== Murder of Heather Barnett ==
=== Background of Barnett ===
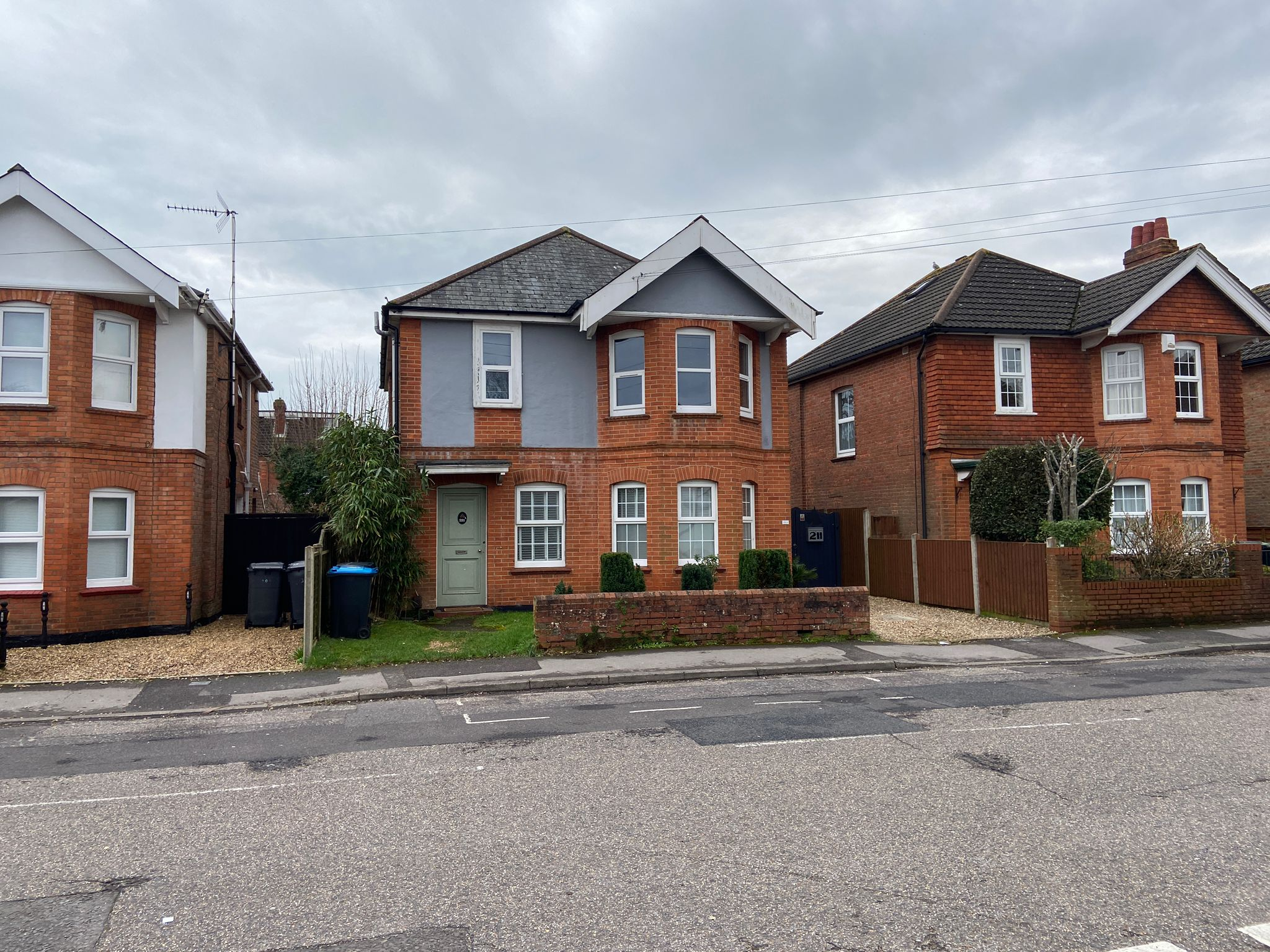
Heather Barnett's former home at 211 Capstone Road

Barnett was born in August 1954, growing up in Sturminster Newton in Dorset. When Barnett was younger, she experienced a house fire at her home in Sturminster Newton, losing many of her possessions. She was described as "feisty" and "independent" by her family and a "hardworking woman who would do anything for anyone that needed help". Barnett lived frugally, shown by her not watching much TV, stating that she did not want to waste electricity. She shared a bedroom with her daughter. Barnett was previously in a relationship with David Marsh, the father of her children, until the early 1990s, when the couple split. The couple had two children: Terry, born 1987, and Caitlin, born in 1991. Also known to people as "Bunny", Barnett worked from her ground floor flat of 211 Capstone Road in the Richmond Park area of Bournemouth as a seamstress. In the flat above, lived her former mother-in-law and grandmother.

=== Restivo arrives in England ===
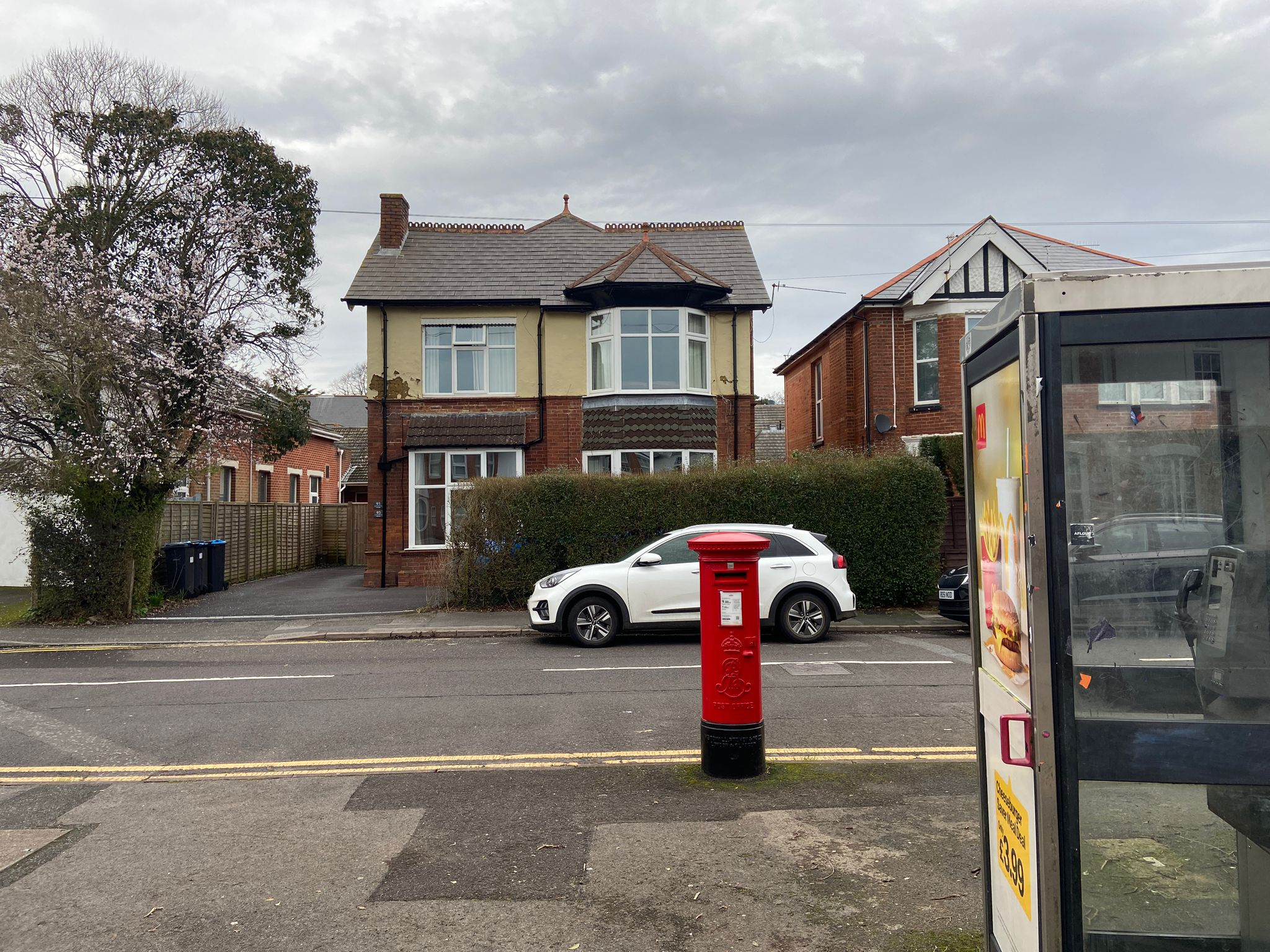
Danilo Restivo's former home at 93 Chatsworth Road, Bournemouth

In March 2002, Restivo arrived in England to move in with an italian woman, Fiamma Marsango, who had been living in Bournemouth for years and that he had met on an internet chatroom. Prior to his arrival in England, in 2001, Restivo had a thyroidectomy, where, during surgery, his vocal cords were paralysed, affecting his voice until he was treated by injections. From a dosage of thyroxine, Restivo described he developed photophobia, making his eyes look bulging, developing proptosis. Restivo took odd jobs and later became romantically involved with Marsango, going on to marry her at the end of 2004. The pair lived at 93 Chatsworth Road, on the corner of Capstone Road. Their house was approximately 20 yards directly across from that of Heather Barnett, and her two children, at that time, aged 14 and 11-years-old.

=== Meeting between Barnett and Restivo ===
Barnett and Restivo knew each other, with Rodney Brown, a previous partner of Barnett's, later telling people that Barnett was scared of Restivo. On 6 November 2002, Restivo visited Barnett's flat, stating that he wanted a set of curtains made for his wife, as a Christmas present. Marsango's bedroom was in a "pitiful state", where rain entered through the roof, there was mould and her current curtains were ruined. At that time, Barnett's spare key went missing, forcing her to have the locks changed. In an email to her sister, Barnett explained that after a client had visited, her spare set of keys were missing and suspected that he had taken them – Barnett was referring to Restivo, as the email mentioned a client who wanted "custom curtains". Barnett also contacted Restivo's fiancée, asking whether Restivo had located the keys, taking a note over to her address that read: "Fiamma, Dan popped over to see me this morning regarding a surprise for you. Don't ask questions and spoil it. I had a spare door key for Terry out on a table and I think Dan must have picked it up inadvertently as I've turned the place upside down and can't find it anywhere..."

=== Murder of Barnett ===
On the morning of 12 November 2002, Barnett had awoken at 05:00 GMT, as the family cat had vomited in the bedroom she shared with her daughter. As it was raining outside and her children were running late to school, Barnett decided to drive them. Barnett took her children to the nearby Summerbee School at 08:30 GMT. At 08:37 GMT, Barnett's white Fiat Punto was seen on CCTV turning into her road, shortly after the school run, less than ten minutes later.

In her home address, Barnett was bludgeoned to death, having been hit "numerous times" with a hammer, with it believed to have caused her death. Barnett's throat was cut, with the injury going from ear to ear. She also suffered stab wounds to her chest. After she was killed, her body was moved into another part of her house, where the killer cut Barnett's bra between the cups, before mutilating her body, removing her breasts and placing them beside her head. Barnett's jeans were unfastened and slightly pulled down, with her upper clothing pulled to the level of her breasts. A large pool of blood was left beneath her body. A portion of her hair was cut, and approximately 30 hairs were placed in her left hand. 9 cm (3.5 in) strands of someone else's cut hair, of a light brown colour, had been placed in her right hand, which rested on Barnett's lower belly.

Arriving home from school just before 16:00 GMT, Barnett's daughter Caitlin called out for her mother, but there was no answer. The radio was still on and Barnett's sewing machine had been knocked over. As Barnett worked from home, it was unusual for her not to be there. Caitlin looked around the house, with the final room being the bathroom. Knocking on the door of the bathroom, there was no answer. Caitlin entered the bathroom first, screaming as she located her mother on the floor. Terry then saw her body, later stating in his police interview that he was not scared, as "there [was] nothing I could do about it". He told police that he opened the door of the bathroom halfway and saw his mother lying on her back, with blood "absolutely everywhere", which made him think it was not an accident.

Hysterical, the children fled the house, where a car pulled up, with Restivo and Marsango, exiting and speaking to the children. Restivo hugged them, bringing the pair to his house across the road until police arrived. Terry attempted to call police but was kept waiting on the line for what appeared to be a quarter of an hour. Caitlin knew Restivo, having spoken to him previously. Restivo appeared to comfort Terry, who told the call handler that his "mum's been murdered", requesting both the police and ambulance.

Terry: I need an ambulance. I need police.

Operator: I've got officers on route. What's happened?

Terry: My mum has just been murdered. This is not a joke.

Operator: Right. Is that your mum I can hear in the background?

Terry: That's my blooming sister.

Operator: So where is your mother then?

Terry: She's lying in the bathroom on her back.

Operator: And what's happened to her?

Terry: She's bloody had pieces cut off her for God's sake.

Operator: Right, now who's done that?

Terry: I don't know!

— Transcript of the phone call Terry made to the police

A neighbour saw them upset and shouting "Mummy's dead, she had been cut up". Terry and Caitlin were taken by Restivo and his then girlfriend into their house, waiting for the police to arrive. They were later cared for by the police, who, two days later, described them as both "in shock and finding it very difficult to come to terms with what they have seen".

== Investigation ==
=== Initial investigation ===
The investigation by Dorset Police's Major Crime Investigation Team (MCIT) was led by Detective Superintendent (DSU) Phil James until his retirement in 2007, with DSU Mark Cooper taking over from 2007 onwards. Police arrived at the scene, having been called to the house just after 16:00 GMT, to reports that a woman's body had been located. This included Sergeant Paul Vacher, who located Terry "absolutely distraught", with him only being able to say "bathroom" and "mother". Sergeant Vacher entered the property and "gingerly opened the door" of the bathroom; however, he stopped to concentrate on preserving the scene. A number of roads were cordoned off by police for forensic examination and searches took place to locate a weapon and bloodstained clothing. DSU James initially told the Dorset Echo they were "looking for someone who left the scene covered in blood or someone who was seen destroying bloodstained clothes or washing bloodstained clothes".

From the objects that had been knocked over, police believed that Barnett had most likely been in her sewing area, potentially having been sat down, when she had been attacked. It was determined that her attacker had struck her over the head with a hammer-like object, before dragging her into the bathroom, where he mutilated her body. As well as police, at 20:45 GMT on the day of the murder, pathologist Allen Anscombe attended the scene, pronouncing her deceased shortly after his arrival. Barnett's legs were stiff with rigor mortis and Anscombe recorded her body temperature as 26 degrees, with a room temperature of 15 degrees. His calculations were that Barnett had died between 18 and 22 hours previously. Initially, police believed that Barnett had been murdered between 08:00 and 16:00 GMT; however, the time of death was estimated to be shortly after Barnett had returned home after taking her children to school that morning from the condition of the blood at the scene, as well as other factors, such as four phone calls to the house between 10:56 and 16:16 that were not answered. As a result, Anscombe concluded that Barnett's time of death was "likely to be much nearer 08:30" than around the time Barnett had been discovered at just after 16:00, indicating that Barnett had been murdered at some point in the morning.

Forensic scientist Geoffrey Robinson attended the scene, completing a precise and methodical examination of the flat. Robinson noted lots of loose hair around the address. He also noted how the doors were intact, with nothing suggesting entry to the address had been forced. Furthermore, he concluded the same as Anscombe that some of Barnett's wounds had occurred after her death, due to the lack of blood at the scene and that Barnett had been quickly subdued. Examining the blood staining that there was, Robinson was able to analyse the spatter, to determine how an injury had occurred. He determined that it was likely Barnett was somewhere close to the floor when she had been attacked and had not been standing up. Damage on the back heel of her left shoe showed that she may have been dragged. Police believed that the murder had occurred in the room that Barnett used for sewing, with blood-splatter stains being located on the patio doors. A trail of blood led from this room, through a living room and into a bathroom. Robinson determined that having been subdued, Barnett had been dragged through her workshop, with blood staining on the throw indicating she had been dragged alongside the settee. From here, Barnett was pulled through a short hallway, into the bathroom. Blood that was located on a bath side panel was most likely from where her severed breasts had been placed before being placed next to her body on the floor.

Robinson noted that there was a discolouration on Barnett's knickers, with these being "contact stains", being more pronounced on the inside of the knickers than the outside, which suggested that they had been formed with something blood-soaked being inserted. A microscopic examination revealed a pattern that appeared to have been created by a knitted garment. Fibres within the blood staining on the knickers was found to match five other fibres that were embedded in blood on the door handle of the bathroom. These appeared to be made of a dark, blue-black acrylic textile, which Robinson hypothesised was a bloodstained glove, with this being what had been placed inside Barnett's knickers. Barnett's jeans had been unfastened and slightly lowered, but no injuries to her genitalia were recorded. Despite determining a gloved hand had been placed inside her underwear, there was no suggestion that Barnett had been sexually assaulted. Robinson noted that Barnett's bra had been cut or ripped from the front, seeing that in her hands, were locks of hair. These hairs were examined microscopically, with it appearing as these had been cut with a sharp-bladed instrument. A DNA sequence was obtained that showed in Barnett's left hand, the hairs (given the tag PJB_{25}), were from Barnett, whereas the hairs in her right hand (given the tag PJB_{6}), were not.

The police discovered that the front door of the house was unlocked, the car's radio was still playing, and there were signs of a struggle in the house. There were no signs of entry having been forced. Police were convinced that the killer was local and had some sort of connection to Barnett and her children. Police believed the suspect lived in close proximity to Barnett, because no one noticed any strangers around the area that morning. Furthermore, the suspect appeared to know Barnett's routine, from the timing of the attack. Police noted how Barnett's murder had been planned with "chilling precision", including the killer being "incredibly forensically aware". Police were convinced that the killer had been wearing gloves, due to a number of dark fibres found at the scene. This meant no fingerprints related to the killer were located. The killer also brought a change of clothes to Barnett's address; however, despite the perceived forensic awareness of the killer, forensic investigation showed the killer had left few traces at the crime scene apart from a green towel stained with blood, that did not belong to Barnett.

Forensic scientist and crime-scene investigator Phillip Webster examined footprints in blood that were located within the address. Using Luminol, a chemical that would identify minute traces of blood, causing a faint blue glow if blood was detected for up to 30 seconds, showed a fine spray of blood near to the patio doors. This was consistent with someone receiving a blow that was 'very fast' and 'heavy'. Strips of blood were identified from the doors of the patio to the bathroom, consistent with a deceased body being dragged. It appeared that from the bathroom, imprints of blood became more and more reduced, implying that the attacker had changed their shoes. with the blood trail in footprints ending near to a chair. Forensic scientist Andrew Sweeting took impressions of footwear from the Lino of the address. Later enquiries revealed that the shoe was a size 9.5–10.5 Nike trainer. The exact make and model of the shoe was identified through detectives travelling to the Nike headquarters in Portland, Oregon, finding it to be a Nike Terra trainer. Police would release the details of the trainer on 12 November 2003; a year to the day of Barnett's murder.

Despite a multitude of forensic evidence, the case initially baffled detectives. DSU James stated that the murder was "unique" in regard to its complexity and difficulty in understanding – there was no clear motive, the murderer had mutilated the body, brought weapons, hair, and a change of clothes. The initial suspicion of a suspect was Barnett's ex-partner, Marsh, who appeared to be 'unreliable and uncooperative', with him being a suspect for a number of months. Police interviewed Barnett's son, Terry, a day after his mother was murdered. Speaking to police, Terry said that he and his sister had walked through the address, before discovering their mother's body. He recalled, "I saw my mum's legs and I thought, 'Oh shit'. I wasn't scared, I knew something had already happened." Terry noted that his mother was obsessive about doors being locked, noting that she did not have money to replace items if they were stolen. As a result, Terry told police his mother tried to keep the front door locked at all times. It emerged that Barnett had changed the locks a week before her death, with Terry explaining that his mother had hung the key over the door handle, to remind him to take the key to school, as he had forgotten to do so the day before; however, the key had gone missing, with Terry recalling that this had occurred after an Italian man named 'Danny' had visited the address for his mother's seamstress services and how he thought he had inadvertently taken the keys with him.

=== Restivo is questioned ===
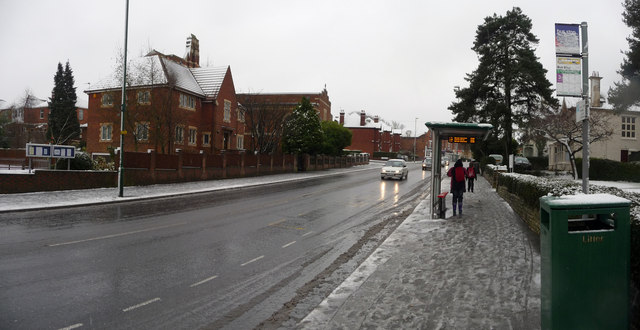
The area where the bus stop Restivo claimed to have taken a bus from (the stop is opposite, nearby, but not pictured)

Restivo was not immediately a person of interest for detectives. Eventually, along with his Italian landlady Fiamma, he was taken to Bournemouth Police station on the evening of the 12. With no translator at hand, Fiamma translated. At that interview, he had produced a bus ticket with a time-stamp of 08:44 a.m. to support his alibi of having been on his way to a computer course at the time of the murder. Restivo told police that at either 08:10 a.m. or 08:20 a.m. on the morning Barnett was killed, he had left home, buying a bus ticket at 08:44 a.m. in Richmond Park Road (which he showed police) and took a bus to his training course by the crime-reduction charity Nacro at the Lion Works building on Wallisdown Road. Restivo stated that he had been at the Nacro building until 15:45. Restivo appeared to have quickly provided an alibi for the morning that Barnett was killed, which was strange, as he was not a suspect at that stage.

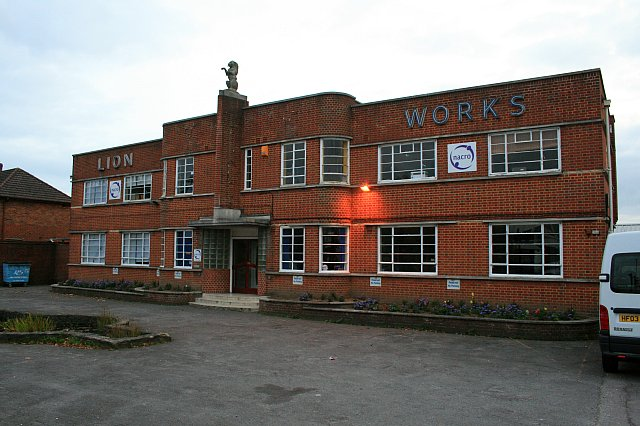
Nacro was based at the Lion Works building in Wallisdown.

On 13 November, the computer that Restivo had claimed to have been using on the day of the murder was seized. Restivo was described by a member of staff at Nacro as not being "able to connect" and it being as if "he was closed, not there almost". It had been heard he had been told off for insistently staring at a female student. On 17 November, police attended Restivo and Marsango's address to collect DNA samples for elimination processes. Both provided samples of their hair, mouth swabs and fingerprints. Police established that Restivo had been at Barnett's address a few days before, asking her to make some curtains for him. After Restivo had visited, Barnett was aware that her house keys had gone missing. Restivo denied knowledge about the keys. Suspiciously, police located a pair of Restivo's trainers in the bath, soaking in bleach and they seized the trainers on 17 November. Restivo was not able to provide a rational explanation other than he was cleaning the shoes.

=== Barnett's post mortem ===
Barnett's post mortem took place the following day, conducted by Allen Anscombe. A post mortem examination revealed 10 separate injuries to Barnett's head. One injury was so severe that it had penetrated through Barnett's skull, revealing brain tissue. On the front of her abdomen, there was a vertical shallow "interrupted cut", 24 cm in length, as well as two other injuries. Barnett's hands also had further injuries. It was of Anscombe's opinion that the injuries Barnett had received had been carried out with a "degree of care and control". The lack of bleeding from some of Barnett's injuries showed that they had occurred after she had died. While he could not be certain, Anscombe thought it was "likely closer" that Barnett died near the time she was last seen, as opposed to when her body was located. Anscombe concluded that Barnett had died as a result of head injuries received by a weapon of "high input energy", most likely therefore "some form of hammer", with the attack not lasting more than a few minutes.

Barnett suffered deep scalp lacerations over the top and back of her head. One of these had penetrated her skull, causing brain tissue to be visible at the base of the wound, with the laceration measuring four by two and a half centimetres and appearing almost triangular in shape. With blood located in her windpipe and infra-alveolar bleeding, it was thought that blood had entered Barnett's lungs, potentially as she took her last gasps of breath. As well as head injuries, Barnett had received other wounds, which Anscombe recorded as not having been random and appeared to have been conducted with "care and control".

The appearance of Barnett's shin, which was dry, parchment and had a yellowish colour, as well as a little amount of blood being present, suggested that her wounds had occurred after she had died; however, there were lacerations, bruising and fractures to Barnett's hands, common with injuries typical with a person attempting to defend themselves. Barnett's airway was completely cut across, with an incision made from two centimetres below Barnett's right ear to left ear. This had cut through skin tissues right down to Barnett's spine, resulting in her airway having been completely cut across, including the arteries. It appeared a shallow knife had been cut down Barnett's abdomen for a length of twenty-four centimetres. Anscombe believed that "a knife or another sharp instrument" was used to cut Barnett's breasts off, noting that there was "nothing to suggest any great skill had been used".

=== Investigations continue ===
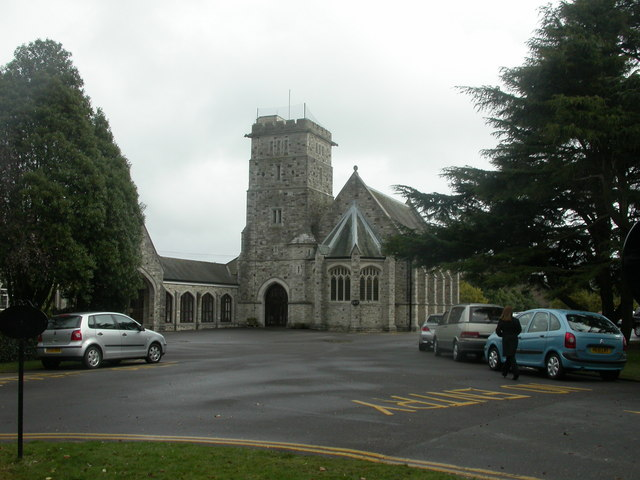
Bournemouth Crematorium, where Barnett's funeral was held

Police asked residents in the local area to check whether any items, such as a hammer or knife, were missing. Police found the suspect was captured on CCTV at 09:30 a.m., walking past the nearby Richmond Arms Pub on Charminster Road; near to the end of the road where Barnett lived. In the initial stages of the investigation, he could not be identified. On 22 November, ten days after her murder, Barnett's best friend, Marilyn Philips appealed for information to the public. In December, traders in Charminster Road collected money for Barnett's children, who were about to experience the first Christmas without her. At the start of 2003, Crimestoppers offered a £10,000 reward for information that led to the arrest and conviction of Barnett's murderer.

=== Barnett's funeral ===
Barnett's funeral was held at Bournemouth Crematorium on 7 February 2003 at 11:00 GMT, where she was cremated. A notice in the Bournemouth Daily Echo read how Barnett had tragically died, aged 48-years-old, stating she was: "A dearly loved mum and sister, will be so sadly missed by all her family and many friends." While the family requested flowers at the funeral were only to be given by Barnett's family, donations were suggested to be sent to the World Wide Fund for Nature.

=== Investigations continue ===
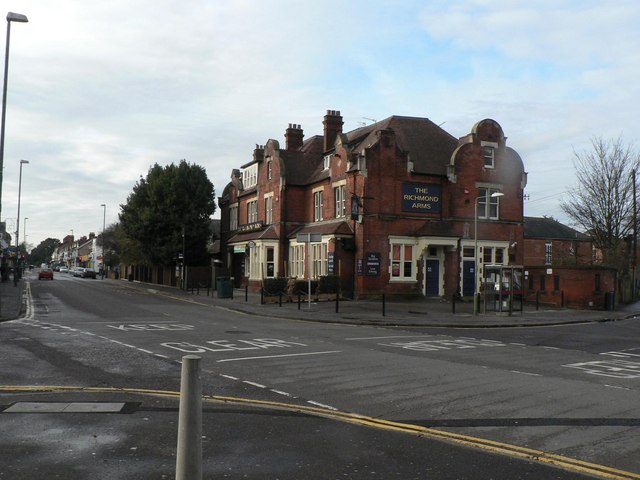
An image of a man police wanted to speak to, as well as the last images of Barnett were captured on CCTV cameras on Charminster Road (Capstone Road where Barnett lived is the road seen in the lower left of this photograph)

In February 2003, police released an e-fit of a man they wanted to talk to, stating it would be to 'eliminate him from our enquiries'. The e-fit showed a man between 35-40-years-old, cleanly shaven, with pale skin and short hair, with it possibly receding at the front. His clothing included a black leather three-quarter-length coat, jeans with an orange streak and coloured splash below the knees and black leather gloves. He was also carrying a black leather bag. One witness stated that the man had been sweating. CCTV had been obtained from the Richmond Arms pub, which showed the man police were looking for. At 09:23 GMT, the man was seen to leave Capstone Road, appearing to be of a bulky build, possibly wearing a hood or hat. Police issued an appeal for information from taxi-drivers. The Daily Echo newspaper produced 400 posters that were displayed around Bournemouth, with a photo of Barnett and the title 'Help Find Her Killer'.

==== A breakthrough ====
The breakthrough in the investigation occurred in May 2003. Having looked at Barnett's computer, they discovered the email Barnett had sent to her friend regarding her keys going missing. This made police realise they needed to look at Restivo with closer inspection. Police visited Nacro, discovering that there was a log book students used to sign out floppy disks. The original time that Restivo had logged out a disk on the morning of the murder was 10:28; however, this had been crossed out and replaced with 09:00. Police suspected Restivo had done this, making a mistake in writing the actual time he had arrived, as opposed to one that would work for a potential alibi.

=== Restivo becomes chief suspect ===
Meanwhile, approximately six months into the enquiry, one of the detectives working on the case conducted internet research on Restivo. They found that Restivo was linked in the disappearance of Claps. Soon after, police started making enquires regarding this. In mid 2003, Restivo was questioned again by the police but released without charge. The detective leading the inquiry later said that Restivo gave the impression of being "bumbling". In the light of Restivo's connection to Claps' disappearance and suspicious behaviour, detectives regarded him as the chief suspect but there was not sufficient evidence for a prosecution. Months continued, without any breakthrough. Marsh, Barnett's ex-partner, appealed to the public for information, with police also revealing that Barnett's breasts had been removed, hoping that a person's memory or conscience may be jogged. As a result, a woman called police, saying she had information on the murder. When they informed her that they would record the conversation, she hung up immediately and never contacted police again, despite a further appeal for her to do so.

=== Restivo is put under surveillance ===
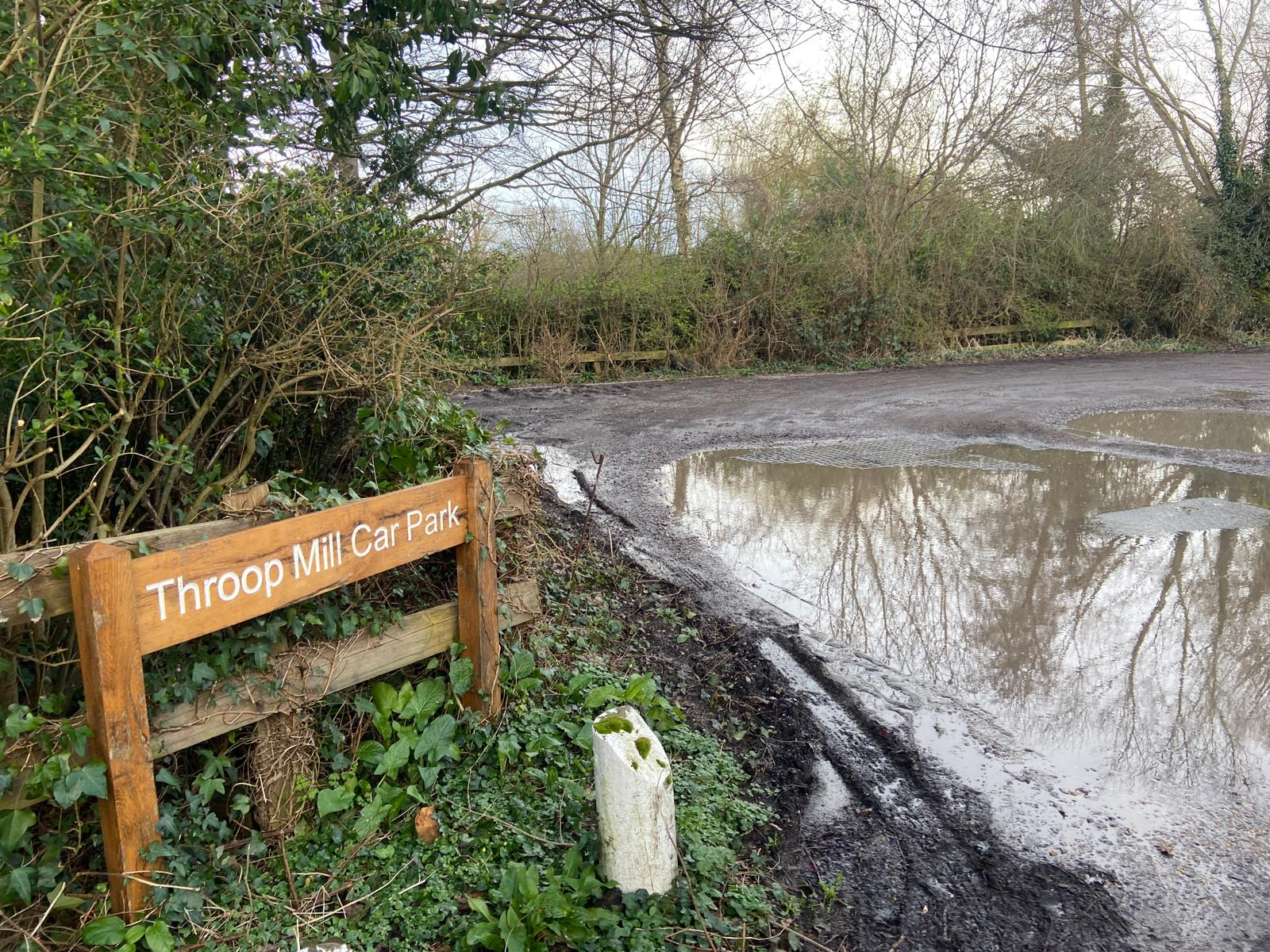
The car park where Restivo was found in possession of a knife, balaclava and other items

In March 2004, convinced that Restivo was the suspected murderer, he was put under close surveillance using electronic tracking and listening devices; police overheard Restivo being spoken to by his parents and female companion as if he were a child. Covert recording in June 2004 heard Restivo talking about his "wonderful innocence". On a later occasion, Restivo was heard to say: "When I touch the hair, hold them in the hand, then everything is visible, everything." Further surveillance occurred from late April to early May, with Detective Sergeant Robert Lee being one of the officers responsible for the covert surveillance. This recorded Restivo aimlessly walking around the area of Throop Mill and Pig Shoot Lane. Police utilised a one-way mirror in the back of a van to observe Restivo, watching as he had parked his white Metro car at the dead end of Pig Shoot Lane, putting on and taking off gloves and wearing his hood tight around his face.

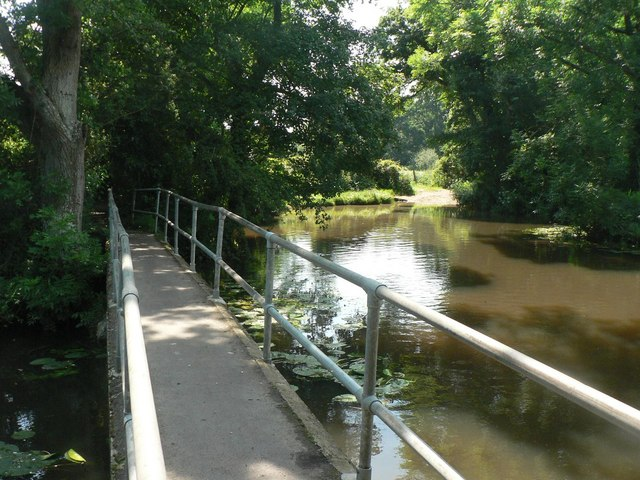
Footbridge at Pig Shoot Lane

On 5 April, officers watched Restivo drive to the car park of Throop Mill on four occasions, where he observed women. On 6 May, officers saw Restivo wearing "dark clothes with the hood of a jacket pulled tightly around his face so that only his glasses and nose were visible". At that time, a lone female was in the area. On 11 May, Restivo was seen observing females in the Throop area, this time in Pig Shoot Lane. He was observed to be wearing dark clothing and was seen to change his clothes, from one identical shirt to another, as well as changing his shoes. He was seen to bend down as a woman walked past him, before standing up, appearing to constantly look out, to see if he was being watched or to watch others. On 12 May, the surveillance team saw Restivo wearing waterproof trousers and walking around the same area. Becoming alarmed at Restivo's behaviour, a uniformed patrol was ordered to stop and search Restivo on a pretext of thefts from cars in the area. One of the officers who attended the scene, PC Ian Fryett, noticed how Restivo, profusely sweating, had drops falling off his nose and face. PC Fryett stated how Restivo appeared "quite agitated", with him having to be calmed down. Although it was a warm day, Restivo was wearing a hoodie over his head and waterproof over-trousers.

In the boot of the vehicle, PC Fryett located various jackets and bin bags, as well as a pair of gloves and balaclava in the pockets of a hooded jacket. In the rear passenger footwell, behind the driver's seat was a large fillet-type knife and packet of tissues within a black holdall. In the door pocket of the driver's door were two pairs of scissors. In his car, an identical change of clothing was also located by police. Regarding the knife, Restivo stated he had located it out while walking, seizing it to prevent children taking it. Restivo's suggestion was not that credible – the surveillance team had not seen him bend down to pick up a knife and it was a school day, meaning there were no children about, also noticed by the surveillance team.

Police were so concerned about how Restivo was behaving that they issued a number of Osman warnings to several people, including Restivo's wife, Marsango, her sons, their girlfriends and foreign students who stayed with the couple at the time. Named after a high-profile case, Osman v United Kingdom, Osman warnings (also letters or notices) are warnings of a death threat or high risk of murder issued by British police or legal authorities to the possible victim. This followed a legal ruling that police have a "duty of care" to issue alerts, after several people were killed, including Ali Osman, who was murdered by Paul Paget-Lewis, a teacher at his son's school, who was suffering from psychotic tendencies. They are used when there is intelligence of the threat but there is not enough evidence to justify the police arresting the potential murderer. If a person chooses to ignore the warning, they are asked to sign to confirm they have been warned. Police explained to Fiamma that her life was at risk if she stayed living with Restivo. Police also warned hospitals where Restivo had applied for work.

=== Victims of haircutting approach police ===
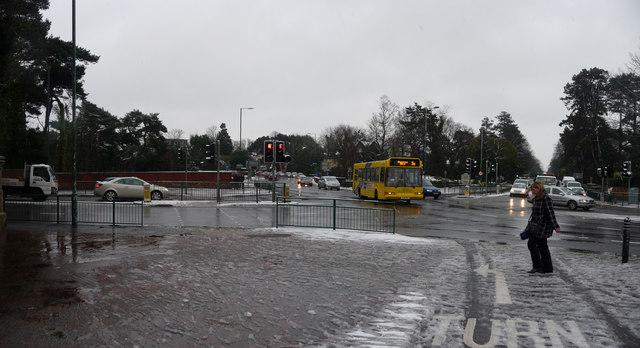
A bus at Cemetery Junction turning onto Charminster Road, Charminster

An appeal in summer of 2004 saw four women approach police stating that they had their hair cut while travelling on buses in the Bournemouth area between 2000 and 2004. This included Holly Stroud, who was on her way to college, studying A-Levels, who, in June 2004, identified Restivo as the man who had cut her hair on a bus on 13 March 2003, after being asked to look at a number of photographs by police. She stated that she was on the number 31 bus from Charminster, just after 08:00 BST. She felt something pulling on her hair, first thinking she had got her hair caught on the seat, feeling as if individual strands were being pulled out. Turning around and expecting it to be a child from school teasing her, she was shocked to find an adult man, staring directly at her. She stated that something that smelt of menthol and was "white and sticky" was in her hair afterwards, with a smell that reminded her of Olbas Oil. Arriving at college, Stroud washed her hair, noticing that her hair had been cut, from strands falling into the sink.

Another student, Katie McGoldrick, identified Restivo from photographs shown to her by police. McGoldrick said that at a time between September 2002 and May 2003, she had caught a bus along Charminster Road. A man sat behind her and she felt her hair being tugged, hearing something that sounded like the cutting of fabric. The man was right up against the back of the seat, with him getting off at the next stop at the Richmond Arms pub, where he stood and stared at her from the pavement. She later realised approximately 2 inches of her hair had been cut. In June 2004, she identified Restivo from a range of photographs.

=== DSU Phil James travels to Italy ===
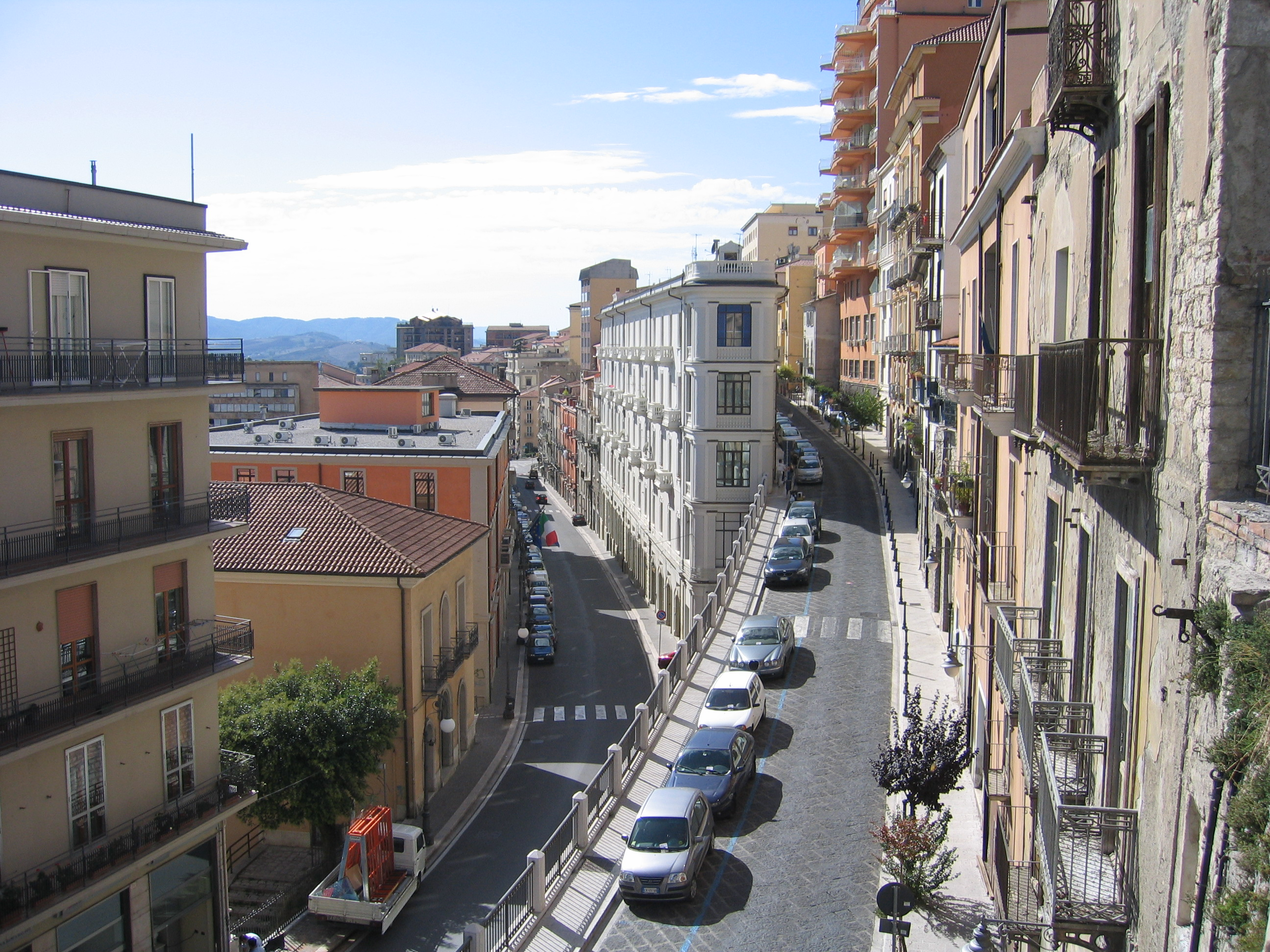
Potenza, Italy

In June 2004, DSU Phil James travelled to Italy to discuss the cases of both Claps' disappearance and Barnett's murder, with Italian police and prosecutors. Andy Martin from the Bournemouth Daily Echo met with DSU James in Potenza, meeting the Claps family. While in Potenza, Martin interviewed Restivo's father about his son's arrest and the cases of Claps and Barnett, in his office at the National Library.

=== Restivo is arrested ===
On 22 June 2004, Restivo was arrested; between that day and 24 June, he was questioned on a number of matters, including hair-cutting, the disappearance of Claps, where he was on the date of Barnett's murder and being in the area of Pig Shoot Lane, as well as his trainers being found covered in bleach in his bath. Restivo stuck to his previous version of events – that he had picked up the knife to prevent children from getting hurt. He answered 'no comment' to other questions. Restivo was told by DSU Phil James that police had been following him and they had major concerns for him, stating that they would continue to follow him because 'we can't allow a man to be walking around Bournemouth following lone women with a knife'. Without enough evidence, Restivo was released on police bail until December 2004.

=== Claps' family visit Bournemouth ===
In June 2004, Gildo had decided to visit Bournemouth with his wife and a team from Chi l'ha visto?, the Italian version of Crimewatch. Here, he met with DSU Phil James, with the pair quizzing each other and sharing as much information as they could about Restivo. The journalist drove Gildo and his wife to Charminster, where they located Restivo's address. Gildo rang the doorbell of the address, where a student lodger opened the door and told him Restivo was out. A car then approached and Gildo immediately recognised who it was – Restivo. Restivo, recognising Gildo, ran around the back of the house, closing himself inside. Gildo and Marsango ended up shouting at each other, while Restivo fled upstairs and watched what was occurring from a window. Gildo, venting his fury, had to be pulled away by the journalist, with the police having been called. Also in June 2004, Restivo married Marsango.

=== Barnett's ex-partner speaks out ===
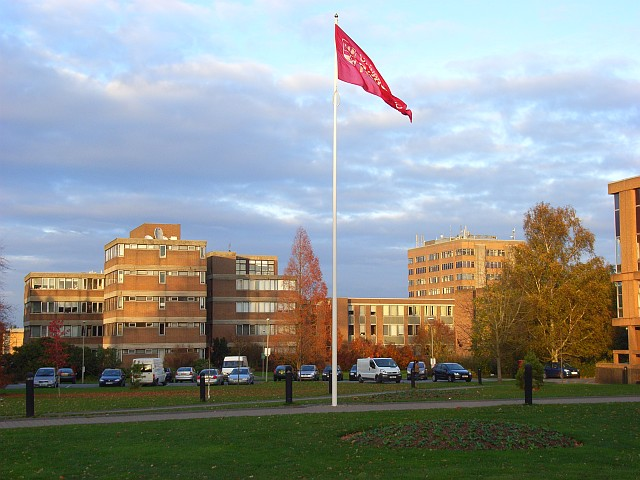
University of Reading

Approaching the second anniversary of Barnett's death, her ex-partner David Marsh appealed to the public for information "to help put the murderer behind bars where he belongs". Marsh found it "incredible" that no-one at that time had come forward, despite where Barnett lived being a busy area. He believed that Barnett's killer was "being shielded", telling whoever was "keeping quiet" to "think again", given that Barnett's killer had "deprived two children of their mother".

=== Analysis of unknown hair in Barnett's hand ===
As the investigation reached 2006, police had failed to gather any significant clues to find Barnett's killer. They liaised with Stuart Black at Reading University, who was an expert in forensic analysis of human remains, to attempt to identify who the hair that was placed in one of Barnett's hands, belonged to. Black and colleagues used stable isotope analysis, building a profile of the person that the hair was from.

Black and his team identified that the hair had been grown for nine months, belonging to a person living in the United Kingdom, who, prior to their hair being cut, had travelled abroad on two occasions and had also changed their diet twice. Police later discovered even further specific details about the person, finding that the person had travelled to 'the Valencia to Almeria area of eastern Spain and/or the Marseille to Perpignan area of southern France for up to six days' between seventy-eight to eight-four days before their hair had been cut. Afterwards, they had visited Tampa, Florida for eight days. They appealed to the public regarding knowledge of anyone who had travelled to the locations, prior to the day of the murder. A match to the person the hair belonged to was never found. DSU Phil James theorised that the hair was from someone the killer knew and "he was effectively transferring his anger and his violence from that individual to Heather Barnett".

=== Detectives visit the FBI for assistance ===
Senior detectives visited behavioural scientists at the FBI headquarters to assist them in building a profile of the murderer and what their motives were. This led to a theory that Restivo wanted to kill again but could not and was too frightened, and that the hair that was in one of Barnett's hands was his next victim. The FBI told police that while they had some "really strange people" they themselves did not have anyone like Restivo and could not understand the case more than the detectives in Dorset.

=== Barnett's murder investigation is featured on television ===
On 12 September 2006, Barnett's murder appeared on the BBC show Crimewatch, leading to 485 calls, with reports from women that they had their hair cut, as well as another woman who reported observing a man cutting a woman's hair, while she was on a bus. In total, thirteen women approached police to state they'd had their hair cut. A follow-up programme in November 2006 led to people contacting police. This included Sonia Taylor. In December 2002, Taylor, had been twenty. She stated that she had been returning home from a morning shift at Topshop, when on the number 31 bus that went along Charminster Road, she felt a tug on her hair. Some of her hair fell to the floor; by this time, a man who had been sitting behind her had left the bus. She later identified him as Restivo. Taylor later told On Demand News (an ITN production): "I felt someone pull my hair and it actually quite hurt, so I turned around and saw him and said 'ow', and he said 'sorry'. So then I moved my hair ... and noticed that my hair was coming out and going on the floor. And then I turned back around and he quickly ran off the bus."

Shopworker Claire George watched the murder investigation being featured on the follow-up Crimewatch programme, including the CCTV of a man walking away from Capstone Road. She contacted police, stating she could identify the man walking away from the road where Barnett lived at the time of her murder, naming him as Danilo Restivo. She recognised Restivo's posture in the footage and could recognise him from this – George stated that she knew both Barnett and Restivo from working in pharmacies, as they were both regular customers; however, it was established George's identification of Restivo was not completely objective. First, she already knew that Restivo was a suspect, having read press reports two years previously that he had been interviewed under caution. Her daughter's dance teacher was Taylor, who was a friend of George's, and having had her hair cut suspiciously while on a bus, this lead George to print off information from the Internet about Restivo, who had a hair cutting fetish.

Another person who approached police was Mark Goddard, who in early 2003 had been working with the CPS as an administrative assistant, had gotten onto a bus on Hendford Road in Bournemouth. While on the bus, he saw a girl sat opposite him, aged seventeen or eighteen. A man who Goddard described as having a "very strange appearance" got onto the bus, dressed in a green and blue anorak, with "bulbous eyes, spectacles and dark hair". He sat behind the girl, pulling some of her hair under the metal handrail on the chair, in front and towards his lap. The hair and his hand were both underneath his anorak, which he'd taken off and it appeared he was masturbating.

=== Restivo is rearrested ===
In November 2006, almost acknowledging the investigation had stalled, police appealed for help in tracing Barnett's keyring that was attached to the key that had gone missing after Restivo had visited her address. On 21 November, Restivo was rearrested and his home searched. Police found a lock of hair, tied with green cotton, which Restivo claimed had been planted. Restivo was questioned about several incidents of haircutting on Bournemouth buses. An officer searching his address, DC Michael Davies, located a lock of brown hair, at the bottom of a chest of drawers in a plastic bag that also contained photographs. The hairs were given the tag MJD_{2}. Despite having samples from Luciano, Gildo and Filomena Claps, David Marsh, Marsango, Barnett, and Restivo, the hairs were not a match.

With not enough evidence for him to be charged, despite what was seen as overwhelming evidence of the bizarreness and dangerousness of Restivo, there still was not enough evidence to charge him and he was released again. Restivo was released on police bail the same evening, "pending further enquiries". DSU Phil James later stated that even as the years progressed, police did not leave the case, working "long hard days", and that "you were always thinking about that case, about the children, about the horrific scene" as well as "the ongoing risk this man, who was walking about, driving about Bournemouth, presented to the public".

=== Further TV appeals reveal more leads on hair-cutting victims in Italy ===
In 2007, DSU Phil James retired and the investigation was taken over by DSU Mark Cooper. In December 2007, police appealed on Crimewatch again, this time to no avail. After police in Italy shared information about Barnett's case, featuring it on state-run television called Chi l'ha Visto? (similar to the BBC's Crimewatch programme) in 2008, a number of women from across Italy stated that someone had cut their hair, outside of a hairdressing setting. The women were from Potenza, Rome, Milan, Rimini, and Turin. In total, fifteen samples were taken for DNA; however, they did not match the mystery hair in Barnett's right hand.

One woman, Angela Campochiaro, contacted Chi l'ha Visto? and stated that in 1993 or 1994, while she was in a cinema with her then fiancé, Restivo had cut her hair. She stated how on a number of occasions she felt her hair being pulled from behind. She turned around and noticed a man with a "jacket on his knees", and that "his hand was moving underneath". Campochiaro stated that the person responsible was "definitely" Restivo. Challenging him, Campochiaro's fiancé got no reply from the man, when he asked him what he was doing. The couple then moved seats.

In 2008, new techniques led to an examination of a bloodstained towel left at the murder scene. Police located Barnett's DNA profile on the green towel. There were very weak reactions indicating that there was saliva present, with this being shown to be from Barnett; however, the quantity of blood on the towel suggested that it had been used by the murderer to wipe blood from his face or hands. This led to a mixed profile between DNA from Barnett and another person, confirmed to be Restivo. It was estimated the chance the DNA components had not come from Restivo as one in fifty-seven thousand. Restivo claimed to have left it on the visit to the home of Barnett on 6 November as a colour match for the curtains he stated he wanted her to make. The evidence was still judged insufficient for a prosecution.

=== Restivo under constant surveillance ===
By 2009, Restivo was under constant surveillance by Dorset Police. In October 2009, Restivo appeared to be being threatened, having received two bullets in the post with an accompanying letter. Restivo accused Gildo of making threats against his life, which was denied by him. Restivo installed two CCTV cameras outside his home. When press arrived outside his address to film news items when Barnett's case was in the news, he would deliberately carry out tasks such as mowing or strimming, to create noise that would make recording impossible. He composed angry letters to Italian newspapers, making paranoid accusations and threatening them. On 17 October, a covert recording device recorded Marsango appearing to be sceptical as to why Restivo had put his trainers in bleach. On 12 November, the seventh anniversary of Barnett's death, police renewed their appeal for information, particularly keen to identify a man on CCTV in Charminster Road on the day of the murder. Detective Inspector Jez Noyce said: "We're committed to bringing Heather's killer to justice. A number of officers are working on the case and we're following several lines of inquiry."

=== Restivo's trainers are forensically examined ===
Another new technique was used to examine Restivo's trainers that police had earlier located bleached in his bath. This showed that the inner sole had trace amounts of blood stains on them, showing that a person had placed their bloodstained feet into the shoes, with blood being present in the left shoe, right inside near the big toe. One explanation was that someone with wet blood on their feet had put their foot into the shoe, alongside the hypothesis that the killer had changed his trainers. Due to the shoes having been bleached, negatively impacting the ability to obtain a DNA profile, the blood could not be linked to a specific person.

=== Computer forensics show Restivo searched the murder enquiry at the start ===
Having seized the hard drive of a computer at Nacro that Restivo claimed he had used, a forensic computer expert found the computer had been powered up at 08:35:32, where it was logged onto at 09:08:03 using the password "Bethine". Shortly after, an application called Spondi Superbi appeared on the desktop, having been downloaded on 11 November at 09:52 from an Italian website. Apart from this application, no internet activity was recorded, but modem activity was, suggesting that the computer had been accessed by another computer on the network; however, from when an administrator had logged on until 10:10:28, there had been no user activity. At 10:33, there was evidence of activity on the internet, with the user accessing an Italian website. This questioned Restivo's alibi that he had been working at the computer. The hard drive showed that the computer had searched updates about the Barnett murder enquiry on 18, 21, and 22 November 2002, as well as 3 and 7 January 2003. Despite the evidence they had collected, police did not feel they had enough evidence to charge Restivo for Barnett's murder, leading to Restivo still being free as of Spring 2010. It was around this time that a remarkable discovery had been made back in Italy.

== Update to Claps investigation ==
=== 2008 case review ===
In 2008, Italian police confidentially carried out a case review into Claps' disappearance. The review indicated how since he was a teenager, Restivo had been treated as a "risk to society". This was from showing "violent tendencies", reports of him stalking women and cutting women's hair.

=== Body of Claps is discovered ===
Don Mimmo Sabia died in 2008, and denied ever being acquainted with Restivo; however, a photograph of Restivo's 18th birthday party later emerged showing Sabia had been one of the guests. On 17 March 2010, the mummified body of Claps was located in the loft of the Most Holy Trinity church, where Restivo had met her in 1993. A worker, investigating a leak had entered the roof space and by the light of his mobile phone, had located her remains in a garret, hidden behind a pile of tiles. Claps' mother was shown photographs of various objects taken at the scene, identifying a white top she had knitted for her daughter, also recognising her daughter's glasses and sandals.

Claps' remains were removed on 18 March, being carried on a zinc stretcher that was covered with a sheet. As the remains reached ground level, a spontaneous applause was heard by a crowd that had gathered. Claps' remains were taken to Matera to be scanned, then to Bari, where Professor Francesco Introna performed an autopsy. It appeared that people had been inside the garret in the years prior to Claps being located. This was shown by receipts and ballot papers with dates of 2008 and 2009 being located, as well as Peroni beer bottles, a section of electric cable and a paintbrush. Forensics expert Eva Sacchi suggested that Claps' remains had been covered with tiles and rubble.

Another revelation was that two cleaners had reported discovering a cranium while cleaning the space. This was alerted to the priest, then Don Ambrogio, who alerted the Bishop, Monsignor Agostino Superbo. When this was revealed in the press, all made half-admissions, denials or accusations about this. The Bishop explained that the priest, not speaking good Italian, had caused him to believe that a "Ukrainian" not a "cranium" had been located. Despite this, authorities were not alerted. It was further discovered that Claps' body had been sawn through, which created an opening in which a smell could emerge, further alerting people to her body being there.

These revelations, along with other failings, led the Claps' family to be filled incandescently with rage, with the failings leading to the delay in Claps' body being located. For more than 17 years, Claps' family were unaware of what had happened to her, struggling to come to terms with her disappearing. Claps' body had remained in the church since 1993, despite a number of tip-offs that had not led to a thorough examination of the scene; this included a priest denying a request for access to investigate the layout of the church during Restivo's perjury trial in the 1990s. Claps' family later stated that Barnett might not have been killed if Italian police had acted "more effectively" on their intelligence of Restivo being a risk.

=== Autopsy ===
Forensic DNA analysis initially suggested the body was not that of Claps; on re-testing, it was found to be hers. Francesco Introna, a professor of legal medicine at Bari, concluded that two circular stains on the wall of where Claps' remains were located indicated that her remains had decomposed in the garret, appearing to have been dragged into that area. The waistband of her trousers was hitched up above her waist and the zip of them had been lowered, with the jeans opened. Claps' bra had been unfastened and cut between the cups, as well as her knickers having been cut. Introna believed that the attacker was right handed and had stabbed Claps with a downward motion from behind. This was from a sharp and penetrating injury to Claps' left scapula.

Lesions were discovered to her ribs and vertebrae. Of the twelve injuries that could be identified, nine were from behind and three were from the front; however, he suggested that the attacker may have still been behind the victim as he pulled her head back and inflicted injuries to her breast and neck, going as far as the anterior part of the thoracic vertebrae. A haemorrhage was indicated through the presence of red blood cells, with Professor Introna establishing that Claps was still alive when she received those injuries. It was thought the wound to her throat had been caused by a pair of scissors that were open. He suggested that the knife used to inflict the injuries would have had a single blade, of a minimum length of 5.5 centimetres and despite being small, would have been very strong. The haemorrhages had occurred very shortly before Claps had died, as fibrinogen necessary for clotting to begin had not had enough time to be produced by her body.

Introna suspected there was a sexual element to the attack due to the ripping of Claps' underwear, her trousers being lowered and the particular locations of haemorrhages in the upper thigh and breast area. Remarkably, Introna located many fragmented, thin and sometimes tangled pieces of hair. Strands of Claps' own hair had been cut from her head shortly after her death and placed near her hands, similar to Barnett's murder. Microscopic examination revealed that in order for the hairs to have been cut with such precision, blood would have had to dry on the hairs, gluing them together (Introna established this through a variety of experiments). He estimated that it would have taken 20 minutes for blood to dry for "sufficient coagulation to occur". He also concluded that Claps had been alive when reaching the garret, with it being impossible for her to have been carried up narrow and steep stairs and through a narrow doorway. He further thought that Claps' body had not had rubble placed on top but that if it had been obscured, it would have been placed in front instead.

Cristina Cattaneo, professor of forensic medicine at the University of Milan. was able to reconstitute and rehydrate Claps' hands with distilled water, which showed a number of defence wounds, which she said had been caused by "the passage of a blade". It seemed very likely that the "piliferous formations" in both of her hands were likely fragments of hair. She also added how she thought the lesion that Claps had on her first thoracic vertebra (a stab wound which had gone through the front of her neck to her spinal cord) had been caused either through two separate stab wounds by a single-edged blade, or possibly through an open pair of scissors being used to cause one single blow. A profile of male DNA that was located on blood on the back of the jumper that had been on Claps' remains was found to match that of Restivo. Italian investigation found DNA and other evidence indicating Restivo was the murderer of Claps.

=== Funeral ===
Her funeral service took place on 2 July 2011 and the Holy Mass was celebrated by Don Marcello Cozzi, an Italian priest who battles disadvantage and poverty in society and promotes legality and justice, along with Don Luigi Ciotti, an Italian priest well known for his strong battles against the mafia and crime (he founded the anti-mafia association Libera). A large number of people from all Italy took part in the ceremony, which was held outside instead of inside of a church following Elisa's family wishes.

== Restivo arrested and charged for Barnett's murder ==
=== Final evidence to arrest for Barnett's murder ===
In 2008, the towel that had been left in Barnett's address was examined for "possible flakes of skin [touch DNA]", being submitted for DNA profiling. While the tests found the majority of DNA on the towel was from Barnett, "minor components" were left when Barnett's DNA profile had been removed. Using a new scientific technique, scientists had been able to extract a partial profile of the killer, showing the minor components matched Restivo's profile and could have come from him. This made a link to Restivo, with a 1 in 57,000 chance of the DNA belonging to someone else. The DNA profile was not a match for Barnett's children, ex-partner, members of the Forensic Science Service or Dorset Police or other people on the national DNA database, with Restivo's profile being the only one the DNA 'complied with'.

With special permission to use the new evidence from the reopened Claps murder case, including the similarities between the deaths of Claps and Barnett and new forensic evidence, during the early morning of Wednesday 19 May 2010, police raided Restivo's home on Chatsworth Road – he had never moved away from the house that looked over Barnett's address. Restivo was arrested at 06:40 GMT on suspicion of Barnett's murder and taken to Poole police station for questioning. Later in the morning, DSU Mark Cooper gave a statement to the media on the steps of Bournemouth police station, stating that a "38-year-old local man had been arrested in connection with the Heather Barnett murder inquiry" and that a "full forensic examination of the property in Chatsworth Road would be taking place" that day. While police did not initially name who they had arrested, the Bournemouth Daily Echo named him, stating they understood it was Restivo and that he had previously been "quizzed over the murder".

=== Restivo's house search and interview ===
Restivo's house was sealed off for a forensic examination to take place, including workmen just after 11:00 GMT to set up scaffolding and screening around the exterior of the house. During police interviews on 19 May, Restivo was asked about the bloodstained green towel, located in Barnett's flat. Previously, he had not mentioned this; however, he was told that a DNA profile could be linked to him and when questioned on 20 May, Restivo accepted it was his towel but that he had given it to provide a colour sample for the curtains he wanted Barnett to make.

=== Restivo is charged with Barnett's murder ===
On the afternoon of 20 May, Restivo was charged with Barnett's murder. He was remanded in police custody, before appearing at Bournemouth magistrates the following day, where he pleaded not guilty to Barnett's murder, before being remanded in prison. The investigation lasted seven-and-a-half years, in which police collected over 700 statements, 6,200 exhibits, and 7,300 documents, making it one of the most extensive, complex, and sustained investigations ever carried out by Dorset Police. On 24 May, Restivo appeared at Winchester Crown Court, where the case was adjourned by judge Guy Boney QC, until 27 May, for a bail hearing to take place. On 27 May, Restivo made another brief appearance at Winchester Crown Court, where he was remanded in custody for a future hearing on 24 September.

== Trial and conviction ==
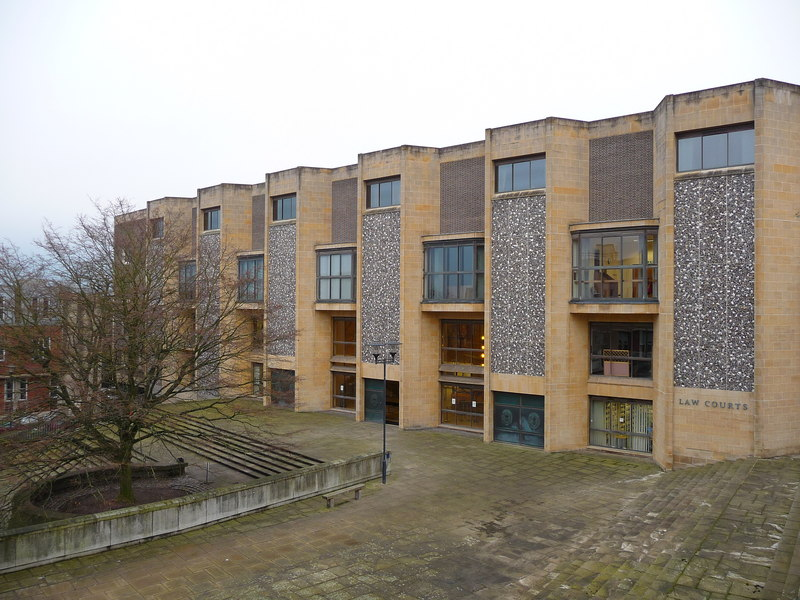
Winchester Combined Court Centre

In a move that the prosecutor said was unrelated to the Italian investigation, it was decided that the evidence against Restivo was sufficient for a prosecution. When the body of Claps was discovered, it became clear that her friend had been telling the truth, and she later testified via a video link at Restivo's trial. Two months after the remains of Claps were found, Restivo was charged with the murder of Barnett. As the case drew international attention, women in the United Kingdom and Italy began to report to police cases where a perpetrator matching Restivo's description, had secretly cut their hair either on a bus or in a cinema.

On 8 November at Winchester Crown Court, Restivo pleaded not guilty to the murder of Barnett. A date for the trial was set for 4 May 2011, with eight weeks allocated for the trial. It was ruled that the English court could hear evidence that Restivo had murdered Claps in Italy, and about the similarities of that murder with the murder of Barnett. Italian investigators testified to the English court that DNA recovered from the clothes on the body of Claps matched Restivo and was consistent with blood.

=== Initial proceedings ===
On 11 May, Restivo appeared at Winchester Crown Court, only speaking to confirm his name. The judge, Mr Justice Burnett, heard legal arguments, as well as granting permission for the press to use Twitter to report during the course of the trial, after legal arguments were presented from the Daily Echo. 12 jurors were chosen out of a potential 64. This was narrowed down to 27 when Mr Justice Burnett asked the jury panel to consider whether they would be able to partake in the trial, given that it may go on until the middle of July 2011. Finally, a jury of five women and seven men were chosen, most appearing to be in their twenties.

Legal history had previously been made a few weeks prior to the trial, when a judge in London had allowed for evidence of Claps disappearance and the discovery of her remains to be used in evidence due to "striking similarity" between the two murders. Reporters from local ITV and BBC channels as well as the Daily Echo from Bournemouth provided coverage of the case, and Italian journalists also attended. Apart from the first day of the trial (when the prosecution opened the case), the trial was not attended by representatives from the national press. It was wondered whether it was due to the trial of Levi Bellfield, who murdered Milly Dowler, was occurring at the same time as Restivo's trial or that the complexity of Restivo's offending could not be written in short paragraphs.

==== Witnesses provide evidence ====
Allen Anscombe provided evidence, telling the court of the injuries that Barnett had sustained. Claire George, who had identified Restivo from CCTV that was shown on Crimewatch in 2006, was called to give evidence. She was questioned by the defence whether she had been influenced by her background knowledge of the case in the way in which she had looked at the footage. Inspector Pete Browning, an officer who had attended Restivo's address on 17 November 2002 to gather DNA to eliminate people from the investigation, told the court that Restivo had shown him to the bathroom, where two trainers were in the bath, with Restivo stating he was cleaning them as they were dirty. Browning noted how "they were wet and a smell of bleach [was] prominent". Holly Stroud, Katie McGoldrick, and Sonia Taylor, who had their hair cut by Restivo provided evidence, as did Goddard, who had witnessed Restivo cutting an unidentified woman's hair.

=== Prosecution and defence case ===
==== Prosecution ====
The prosecution's case was that Restivo had killed Claps but the jury were reminded that they were not trying Restivo for Claps' murder, although there were "striking similarities" between Claps' and Barnett's murders. The prosecution stated "if you are sure that [Restivo] killed Claps, you should use that evidence to establish that the same person killed Heather Barnett". The prosecution believed that Restivo had murdered and mutilated Barnett, having gained access to Barnett's address, either from Barnett opening the door or Restivo opening it himself, using the keys that had gone missing the week before. It was the prosecution's case that Barnett had been murdered in a premeditated attack and that Restivo had made a "deliberate attempt to remove any forensic link to the scene of the murder", by placing his shoes in bleach. As for the towel located inside the scene, the prosecution alleged that Restivo may have used this to wipe Barnett's blood from him and had forgotten to take the towel with him when he left the scene.

The video recorded interview of Barnett's son, Terry, that had occurred in 2002 was the first piece of evidence played to the court, with Restivo appearing "impassive" when the court heard Terry explaining the reason for the locks being changed was a key going missing and that "the Italian living opposite had accidentally taken the spare key". In reference to the green towel that was left at the scene, the prosecution stated that Restivo had made up the story of having given it to Barnett to colour match it against curtains he wanted making, when he had been told his DNA had been located on the towel. The prosecution argued that Restivo had told "lie upon lie upon lie" and that "his lies have found him out". He stated that Restivo's explanations ranged from 'the absolutely absurd to the ridiculous', in reference to the murders of Barnett and Claps. The prosecution further argued that Restivo had to be responsible for Barnett and Claps' deaths due to how "strikingly similar" the two cases were. Italian forensics expert Colonel Giampietro Lago of the Carabinieri explained to the jury that "male DNA found on the jumper of Elisa Claps was likely to have been blood rather than saliva", and that her jumper was "DNA rich with both male and female components".

In relation to Restivo's alibi that he had caught a bus on the morning of Barnett's murder and had shown police a bus ticket to prove that, the prosecution stated that it only established Restivo had purchased a ticket and that he could have immediately gotten off the bus and walked to Barnett's flat. From CCTV footage and a shop worker identifying Restivo, the prosecution argued that Restivo was at Barnett's address by 08:55 a.m., where he murdered and mutilated her, before changing his clothes, and before being seen again on Charminster Road by 09:24 a.m. The prosecution stated that it was after the murder that Restivo went on to his training course at Nacro. Furthermore, the prosecution provided evidence that although Restivo had claimed in a police interview that he had arrived at Nacro at 9 a.m. and immediately logged onto the computer, the computer records showed that the computer had not been used between 09:09 a.m. and 10:10 a.m.

Evidence was presented regarding Restivo being followed by police, that painted a picture of him observing lone females. Furthermore, the jury were told about Restivo's fetish of cutting hair – in total, 15 cases, mainly in the Winton area of Bournemouth, were reported, with a further 9 reports in Italy, prior to Restivo moving to the United Kingdom. On 25 May 2011, the ninth day of the trial, the jury were taken to Barnett's and Restivo's addresses, in order to familiarise themselves with the key locations in the prosecution case. They were accompanied by the judge, prosecution and defence team, court staff, detectives, Restivo's interpreter and the media, alongside a 'significant police presence'. Restivo chose not to be present for the jury visit. Other locations included prominent CCTV locations, as well as the bus stop on Richmond Road, where Restivo alleged he had purchased a bus ticket. The jury also visited Nacro in Wallisdown Road, where Restivo alleged he was at the time of the murder, as well as Pig Shoot Lane in Hurn and Throop Mill, where police had put Restivo under surveillance, watching him 'wandering around for hours at a time'.

==== Evidence is heard from Italian experts and witnesses ====
The evidence from Italy began with a video link to a courtroom in Potenza. Angela Campochiaro, who had her hair cut in Italy by Restivo, provided evidence, followed by her now husband, Nicola Marino, who mentioned seeing Restivo's gesture looking like he was masturbating. Giovanni Motta also provided evidence of seeing Restivo before lunch, where Restivo had asked him to attend hospital with him for a cut on his hand. Motta and his girlfriend, Restivo's sister Anna, had arrived back at the Restivo residence for lunch at approximately 13:00, where they observed Restivo walking with a "very quick step" towards them, appearing "very sweaty". Restivo asked Motta to accompany him to the hospital for treatment to a cut on his hand, that he said he had sustained by going to escalators that were being built, out of curiosity. The cut was small, approximately a centimetre in length, with Motta not thinking it needed hospital treatment; however, Restivo insisted that they went. A doctor put a single stitch in the wound.

Paola Santarsiere, who Restivo had fancied earlier in the autumn of 1993, also provided evidence. She had met Restivo a few times, with Restivo claiming that she had accompanied him to the escalator building site a few days before Claps' murder, a point which she denied in court. Restivo had told her that he knew "all the secrets of the churches", including that he had keys to one church, knowing all its hidden corners. Santarsiere told the court that Restivo had once told her that he was "good" but that if he was made angry by someone he was "capable of brutal actions".

Angelica Abbruzzese was one of Claps' best friends. She stated she had gone to Mass at the Chiesa della Trinità and on leaving saw a girl that was meant to be going to the countryside with Claps, a girl called Eliana De Cillis. Asking where Claps was, she told Abbruzzese that she was due to meet Restivo at the Trinità, where he was going to give her a present (something Restivo had denied, stating the meeting was for advice about a girl). Abbruzzese told the court that she later spoke to Restivo, asking how Claps appeared on their meeting, with him first stating she seemed tranquil, before stating she had been nervous due to a person that had been annoying her. Abbruzzese stated she did not believe Restivo's account.

Many women stated that Restivo used a strategy of a regalino – a little present – to tempt young women into isolated and secluded locations. Next to give evidence was Gildo Claps. He told the court about his anxiety rising on hearing that Claps had not gone to mass and instead had met with Restivo. He went to the church but discovered that the priest was the only person with keys to access certain areas. Gildo later spoke to press outside the courtroom, stating: "I hope that the hour of justice has arrived. And we're waiting for him in Italy because we're hoping, as we have for eighteen years, that he'll be tried and sentenced for Elisa's murder.|title=Gildo Claps speaking to Italian journalists outside of Winchester Crown Court during Restivo's trial for the murder of Barnett."

The doctor who put a stitch into Restivo's hand in September 1993 also gave evidence, along with officers from the Italian police, who had been involved with the Claps case at the time. Professor Francesco Introna attended the trial in person, where a photograph of Claps' mummified body was shown. De Cillis, one of Claps' best friends gave evidence, telling the court that Claps had to see Restivo because he had a present for her for passing her retakes. She stated that Claps did not meet her at an agreed set of phoneboxes at 11:45. Having failed to meet her, De Cillis went to Restivo's address, speaking to him on the intercom, with Restivo being worried as to why Claps was not with her. As De Cillis had been tried for perjury in the 1990s along with Restivo, the defence focused on this, reading a passage from her earlier evidence where she stated to an Italian court at trial in 1995 that she considered lying about her whereabout to her parents. De Cillis had told Gildo that Claps had been to Mass because Claps did not want it to be known she had met Restivo. De Cillis stated she could not remember what she was asked at the 1995 trial but that she "always told the truth".

Lieutenant Colonel Gianpietro Lago attended the court in person, stating that it was his opinion that DNA on the jumper Claps was wearing that was linked to Restivo was from blood, with an "extremely strong probability that the cells and DNA come from blood". Forensic expert Eva Sacchi hypothesised that stones found in Claps' shoe and in the loft where her body was found indicated that she may have walked, even a short distance, while in the loft space. Sacchi's opinion was that Claps had arrived alive there. The prosecution ended their case, stating: "There is a reason that all the evidence points to him. It is because it is him."

==== Defence case ====
Prior to Restivo's defence counsel opening their case, David Jeremy QC was heard to tell a young member of his team, "You will never see a day like this in court again", and the defence counsel stated that while Restivo "was a liar and presented a deeply unattractive oddity", it did not make him a killer. Due to Restivo having changed his story or refused to answer several matters over the years of the investigation for both Claps' and Barnett's cases, Restivo's defence counsel confronted Restivo's lies and inconsistencies themselves rather than the prosecution doing so when Restivo took the stand. Jeremy said that Restivo was "often in the habit of exchanging a bad lie for an even worse one", admitting how Restivo had "self destructed in the witness box"; however, this did not make Restivo a killer – Restivo's defence counsel questioned whether Restivo's personality "matched that of the person who had killed Heather Barnett and Elisa Claps", describing the crimes as of "almost inhuman depravity".

The lock of hair that had been located during a search on 21 November 2006 was shown to the court, being passed to the judge and jury within an evidence bag. The defence, suggesting that photos within a bag where the hair was located were of very young children, making the lock of hair being present having a more innocent explanation that it related to a keepsake from childhood. The forensic scientist Geoffrey Robinson would later note that the scene "perplexed him" as to "why there wasn't more chaos" within the scene. The defence questioned the forensics of the case to Robinson, a forensic scientist who had attended the scene, asking him about "false positives" regarding the identification of blood, in reference to deficiency within Luminol. The defence questioned Craig Wilson, the forensic computer expert, whether all the evidence had been recovered from the computer to show it was idle when Restivo had claimed to be using it.

=== Restivo's evidence ===
Restivo was due to enter the witness box on 17 June. This was delayed until 20 June, as Restivo stated he had a headache, and not feeling up to taking the stand. Restivo was accompanied by a female interpreter. During the trial, she was to be replaced, when it was noted she was unable to translate certain words, which included mistranslating words, as well as not translating certain words, such as "masturbation" or "penis", referring to what Restivo had allegedly done in a cinema. Restivo stated that due to "a host of medical reasons" his memory of key events was poor, and stating that he suffered from sleep apnoea in 2006 and as a result forgot things, with his medical conditions being the reason he'd refused to answer questions to police and that his statements appeared to be different from each other. During his trial, Restivo gave evidence and stated 'I have never killed anybody'. The similarities of Claps' and Barnett's murders, in which their hair was cut, as well as their bras cut and trousers lowered was put to Restivo, to which he replied: "I haven't killed either of them."

MB: Both victims had their hair cut after death, didn't they?

DR: Based on what the documents say, yes.

MB: Do you agree that is a similar feature?

DR: I haven't cut hair...

MB: I didn't ask that. I asked: 'Do you agree that it is a similar feature?'

DR: I don't know, I don't know.

MB: Do you agree that both victims having their bra cut is a similar feature?

DR: I don't know.

MB: That both having their trousers and pants pulled down is a similar feature?

DR: I don't know, I don't know.

MB: Do you agree that in each case it looks as though the killer liked cutting hair?

DR: I don't know this, I haven't killed either Elisa Claps or Heather Barnett. You are suggesting that the killer is me, and I'm telling you that it's not me.

MB: At the moment, we're just talking about the killer generally. From everything you've seen and heard, does it look like the killer of both women liked cutting hair?

DR: I don't know.

MB: Two murders, nine years apart, yes? And in different countries, yes? And you have a connection with both victims, didn't you?

Restivo does not answer.

MB: Yesterday you talked about touching hair, but of course you cut it as well, didn't you? That means you must have had scissors with you, doesn't it? Did you take them with you every day?

DR: The scissors had a rounded edge so as not to harm anybody.

MB: That wasn't the question.

DR: Yes, perhaps.

MB: So you would go on the bus and look for girls with long hair?

DR: Yes.

MB: I'm going to suggest to you that a certain amount of stalking and planning went into your hair-cutting episodes.

DR: No it wasn't planned and I wasn't stalking them…in my opinion stalking is when you stare and follow this person everywhere and you exasperate this person. This is not what happened in my case, it was something that just happened.

MB: When Holly [Stroud] got to school, she found a sticky something in her hair. What did you put in her hair?

DR: I didn't put anything in it. Because my nose was blocked, I had in my pocket a substance, an oily substance. It's possible that the pot got broken, and perhaps if I touched her hair somehow this oil got transferred.

Bowes recounts testimony of one witness who saw Restivo touch a girl's hair after taking off his anorak.

DR: I used to do it, I admit that, but it was one of my techniques...

MB: Explain a little more about your techniques.

DR: I used my jacket to cover my hands and then I would pull the hair and cut the hair from underneath the jacket.

MB: With the hair, you liked the touch, and so you cut the hair yes? And then you'd got your trophy, hadn't you?

DR: Yes.

MB: Didn't you want to keep your trophy?

DR: As I said, I tried to smell it, but I couldn't, so I threw it away. I would feel the touch of the hair and then throw it on the streets.

MB: If you're telling the truth, you couldn't smell anyway.

DR: Perhaps this was one of the reasons why I cut hair, because I couldn't smell the scent of a woman.

MB: And so what you wanted to do was touch the hair, yes? If you're just going to throw it away, what's the point in cutting it?

DR: Because I wanted to feel the touch.

MB: But you've already touched it.

DR: But I kept touching it afterwards.

MB: When would you throw it away?

DR: When I got off the bus, just enough time to smell the hair. I kept touching the hair and would then throw it away.

— Exchange between Restivo (DR) and prosecutor Michael Bowes QC (MB)

In relation to cutting hair, Restivo told the court that he first started cutting young women's hair "for a bet", stating that it started when he was 15 or 16-years-old, while attending a scientific school. Denying anything sexual about his actions, Restivo stated that after initially cutting hair for the bet on three occasions, he "started liking it" and "meant no harm to anyone", just liking "the feel of the hair and the smell of it". He stated that after cutting the hair, he would throw it onto the street. He told the court that he "sought help from psychologists because he could not stop doing it". Restivo stated that since he had moved to Bournemouth in March 2002, he had cut the hair of six girls in England and explained that he did not realise that it was an offence to cut someone's hair, apologising if it was. Restivo denied that he kept locks of hair he had cut as trophies, stating that he had taken "a trophy" he had previously cut and placed it in Barnett's hand after he killed her.

Restivo denied masturbating in public, noting that he had never done so "because of the education" that he had received from his family. He further said: "It's a very serious offence to masturbate in public in Italy ... and I guess it's the same in other countries." Restivo told the court how women or their parents were angered or scared when he sent flowers to them, not being able to understand why they did not want him to send flowers to them. Restivo explained to the court that Claps had rejected him after he had declared his "affection" for her in July 1993. He told the court that on the day Claps had gone missing, they had spoken for approximately 10 minutes, before each going their separate ways. Restivo stated he was injured after going through a building site, having been "intrigued" by the "ingenious design" of an escalator. Restivo stated that he could not give any explanation as to why his DNA was on a pullover close to a stab wound on Claps' back.

MB: In the course of the struggle she cut her own hand deeply, didn't she, by grasping the knife you were using?

DR: I saw Elisa Claps leaving the church at 11:50...

MB: And in the course of knifing her and struggling, your knife slipped a bit and you caught yourself on the right hand?

DR: I saw Elisa Claps leaving the church at 11:50. I got injured on the escalator.

MB: You were injured by your own knife, weren't you?

DR: I saw Elisa Claps leaving the church at 11:50, OK?

— Exchange between Restivo (DR) and prosecutor Michael Bowes QC (MB) regarding his involvement in the murder of Claps

Restivo stated that he had received the injury to his hand rolling down the escalator, strangely, with his hand over his teeth in order to protect them. Inconsistencies within Restivo's accounts were highlighted, which mainly focused on the presence of a green towel at the scene and his computer activity at Nacro. This caused Restivo to change his version of events while in court. Asked what he was doing on the morning Barnett was killed, Restivo stated that it took him thirty-four minutes to walk a distance of 100 metres, from his house to the bus stop, due to him hyperventilating, as a result of the paralysis of his left vocal nerve, and a loss of feeling on the left of his neck.

MB: On 12 November 2002, you went into Heather Barnett's house. You went...

DR: On 12 November 2002 I was at Nacro.

MB: In almost exactly the same way, on 12 September 1993.

DR: I didn't kill Elisa Claps. I saw her leave the church at 11:50, and I was at Nacro on 12 November at 9 a.m. OK?

MB: Elisa Claps' body was found last year in the loft where you left her.

DR: I never knew of and I never saw the loft. I saw Elisa Claps leaving the church at 11:50. I followed her with my gaze...

MB: And just like Heather Barnett, her hair was cut after death, her bra had been cut, her knickers and trousers lowered...

DR: I've never killed anybody. I wasn't at Heather Barnett's house on 12 November. I was at Nacro.

MB: You had murdered both of them.

DR: I haven't killed anybody. I saw Elisa Claps leave the church at 11:50 through the curtains, and 12 November 2002 I was at Nacro.

— Exchange between Restivo (DR) and prosecutor Michael Bowes QC (MB)

Regarding the minor trace of DNA found on the towel in the scene that matched his profile, Restivo explained: "I gave Heather a green towel which was the same colour I wanted." This was despite during one police interview, stating he knew nothing about the towel, before altering his story when police explained that DNA linked to him was found on the towel. The prosecution put it to Restivo that having curtains made for his wife by Barnett was a "pretence" to "plan her murder". Restivo stated that he recalled a discussion relating to Barnett losing or mislaying her key, but could not account for what had happened to her key. The prosecution suggested that Restivo returned the week after and killed Barnett, to which Restivo replied: "No, don't insinuate things that are not true. I won't accept that, I was at Nacro all that day." Restivo explained to the court that the only time he had met Barnett was the week before her death, when he asked Barnett to make curtains for his wife Fiamma that would go in her bedroom. Despite a statement that Restivo gave six days after Barnett was killed, in which he stated he went into the lounge of Barnett's house, where she showed him a catalogue of curtains, Restivo later told the court that he only went into the hallway.

On arriving at his computer course at Nacro at 09:00 GMT, where he logged onto a computer using an administrators password. He stated that between 09:15 and 10:15 GMT, he studied his file and worked on the computer, both on and off the internet. Restivo stated that at 10:30 GMT he realised he had not signed the register, automatically looked at his watch and wrote "10:30". He then changed the time to the time he arrived, to 09:00 GMT. Restivo denied the prosecution's claim that he arrived at 10:10 GMT and that he later altered the time, attempting to support a false alibi. The prosecution put it to Restivo that there were three versions of his alibi – one, stating that he had arrived at 09:00 GMT, working on the computer, another, where he stated that someone else may have been using the computer (after the computer forensic expert gave evidence stating there had not been activity on the computer during the times Restivo stated he was on the computer) and a third alibi, stating that Restivo had the administrator's password "all along", which would allow him to alter the disc log. Restivo stated that his distrust of the police led him to lie in his police interview about activity on the computer.

Restivo repeated the same line in Italian: "lo, il dodici novembre duemiladue, ero al Nacro", which translated to "I, on 12 November 2002, was at Nacro." The prosecution quizzed Restivo about the moment Barnett's children left the house, having located their mother's body. Restivo denied that him comforting Barnett's children after they had located their mother's body was a "repulsive charade", stating instead that "it was sincere".

MB: According to the witness statement, you hugged those children [Terry and Caitlin Marsh, Barnett's children].

DR: Yes.

MB: You understand that the prosecution case is that that morning you had murdered their mother.

DR: I've never killed anybody.

MB: You were playing out a repulsive charade, you understand that is the prosecution case.

DR: No, it was sincere.

— Exchange between Restivo (DR) and prosecutor Michael Bowes QC (MB) regarding him comforting Barnett's children after they had discovered her body

Restivo explained that acrylic hair that was located in a drawer was from when he had attended a fancy dress party, dressed up as a Mexican, and that the hair was used as a moustache. Furthermore, Restivo denied that he knew the liquid in his bath was bleach, when police found his shoes in there five days after Barnett's murder. Stating that his English was not good enough to understand what the writing was on the bottle, Restivo told the court that he thought the liquid was "cleaning soap for the floor", adding that he could not smell bleach due to his "poor sense of smell". Restivo denied that he was trying to erase blood from the shoes, stating that he did it because his wife told him his shoes smelled. Restivo added: "Up until last year, until I received the paperwork for the case, I did not know that bleach destroys DNA. I am not a forensics expert." Regarding being watched in the area of Throop by police surveillance officers, Restivo denied that he was stalking women, stating he was there to "relax and enjoy nature". Restivo stated "I have never talked to women", where he also appeared to provide a rambling, unrelated answer to a question.

MB: You're seen [on police surveillance videos] removing your clothing, taking off over-trousers and changing trainers. Why?

DR: The shoes that I was wearing had a sole full of mud. If I had driven with shoes full of mud, the shoes on the accelerator or the brakes would have slipped and I could have caused an accident. This was taught to me both by the garden centre where I used to work ... and the person who taught me how to drive in Italy.

MB: Were you scared the shirt would get muddy as well?

DR: The problem that I have with the thyroid is the regulation of my body temperature. I give you this information so that we understand each other. In 1997, I developed a condition [Graves' disease], which affected the thyroid. I had a hyper-production of thyroxine in the blood ... one of the side effects is warm and cold hands, warm body and cold body ... when they removed my thyroid in 2001, my body had to absorb thyroxine from outside. The correct dosage wasn't accepted by my body and I had, since 2001 until 2006 and 2007, the problem of the correct dosage of thyroxine in my blood. In this period of time, my dosage went from 125mg to 250mg to 125mg to 150mg to 175mg. This different dosage was due to the fact that my body wouldn't accept the right dosage, and the temperature of my body changes. Sometimes I'm cold, sometimes I sweat. Now with 175mg, even though the dosage is slightly high, I manage to maintain the same body temperature.

MB: Finished?

— Exchange between Restivo (DR) and prosecutor Michael Bowes QC (MB) regarding him being watched by police in the area of Throop

Restivo stated that footage of him being seen to bend down as a woman walks past was showing him collecting insects for lizards he had at home. He added that the tissues found in his possession were for this reason, as well as his bag.

Can I point something out? I've said in previous days that I used to collect insects in order to feed my geckos. When I bent over I had just caught some insect. I point out that I bent down and I must have collected the insect, and in the meantime just by chance the woman must have gone past. I went to the park just because I like nature. I like to observe birds, jays, kingfishers, swans, the ducks. I like nature, I like dogs. I must have stopped many people, which you can't see from the video, who had dogs. Before coming here I had a dog. I had a Dobermann who took part in beauty contests…

— Restivo accounting for his movements in Throop

In regards to being found with scissors and a knife in his possession, Restivo stated that he had picked up the knife, intending to "hand it in", and that he used the scissors to cut out stories in newspapers.

MB: Mr Restivo, you're just making up a story about the little children and the knife. It's just a fantasy isn't it. Lying there gleaming, was it?

DR: (Having shaken his head) I don't remember, honestly. You're asking me questions from 2004. How it gleamed, I don't know.

MB: It was your knife you took to Throop, but once police had taken it, you had to buy a new box set. What you were doing at Throop with a bag and knife and balaclava was stalking women.

DR: No, no, no, I was simply relaxing and enjoying nature, and was there to collect insects. Never, ever have I stalked women. OK?

MB: Except on buses?

— Exchange between Restivo (DR) and prosecutor Michael Bowes QC (MB) regarding him being in possession of a knife in the area of Throop

For the balaclava that was found in his possession, Restivo stated that as he had a sinus problem, the balaclava kept his head warm in winter.

Earlier you asked about my medical condition. I told you there was something I hadn't remembered. And among these medical conditions there is the chronic sinus condition, an inflammation of the nerves. The balaclava was suggested to me by my GP for when it was too cold, and given that in my car the heating didn't work, when I turned the engine on for ten minutes to heat the car, I would use the balaclava to protect myself from the cold. I've never driven with my balaclava on.

— Restivo explains the reason he was in possession of a balaclava, amongst other items, such as a knife and identical change of clothes, when searched by police in Throop

Restivo stated that he lied when the blatant contradictions to police questions after his arrest in 2004 and 2010 were put to him, stating that he did not trust the police, because they were leaking information to the press in Italy. As he was explaining this, Restivo started to become more and more irate, pointing his finger around the court at various police officers and journalists. This included Martin and DSU James, where Restivo alleged they had provided leaks to the Italian media regarding his police interviews. He pointed at them saying "both these people are in court today". Restivo had previously blamed the Bournemouth Daily Echo in early 2010, stating in 2004 that Martin had accused him of "being mafioso" and had declared him to be "Sicilian mafia". Tobias Jones, who observed Restivo in court described in his book how Restivo appeared "astonishingly stupid" when giving evidence.

You watched him and wondered how he had got away with both murders for so very long. He appeared astonishingly stupid in the box. Every story he told rang false. He was slippery and deceitful.

— Tobias Jones, Blood on the Altar, recounting observing Restivo give evidence at his murder trial

=== Concluding speeches ===
==== Prosecution closing speech ====
Michael Bowes concluded the prosecution case proving all the evidence linking Restivo to the murder of Claps and Barnett.

You know what the prosecution case is. The one thing you don't leave outside the court is your common sense, and we submit that common sense does play a very substantial role in this case. It might seem quite complicated, but in the end it's actually straightforward: Restivo is indeed the man who murdered Heather Barnett ... Let's remind ourselves of the basic similarities [between the two murders]: when Heather Barnett was found, the killer had placed a lock of someone else's hair in her right hand and her own hair in her left; her bra was cut, possibly torn, at the front, after death; and the position of her trousers and underwear were lowered just enough to reveal the pubic region. What had happened nine years earlier? Elisa Claps was murdered, her hair was cut after death, her bra was cut at the front, and the position of the trousers and the pants was the same. Two murders nine years apart in two different countries. Where does the defendant come in? He had links to both of them, he was very close by when both died. Elisa Claps never came out in the Potenza sunlight that Sunday morning. She had been lured to that loft by the promise of a present ... his DNA was on her pullover ... if her pullover had such rich traces of DNA, that's not his saliva, that's his blood. Throughout you may think he [Restivo] was evasive in the extreme. From time to time he had what we submit was selective amnesia; the fog of convenience came down. But when it helped him, his memory was razor sharp. In each case there must have been stalking and planning [in reference to the cutting of the hair]. He murdered Heather Barnett having stalked and planned. Every time he cut hair he took scissors with him. He stalked and selected and preyed. He was used to being tooled up. He agreed it must have been frightening and intrusive. All he cared about was himself, and gratifying what he wanted to do. He's not harmless, he's very harmful indeed.

Bowes continued, going over the evidence again, outlining the times when Restivo had changed his story and how it had got "more and more ridiculous". He noted how Claps was someone who Restivo had pestered "quite a lot" and that it was "common sense" in that regard she would have wanted to stay out in the open. He stated that "very awfully" it appeared that Claps did not immediately die, surviving for another fifteen minutes after being attacked.

Shortly after having butchered Elisa Claps, he's back outside, but he had a problem: he has that cut. He comes up with a story and is then stuck with it, the absolutely absurd one that he trips head-over-heels down a whole flight of stairs. There's no injury, but the one thing that did happen is that a tiny piece of metal sprung up and embedded itself in him. He has to try and give more detail. It was one to two centimetres long, triangular in shape and very thin, "absolutely tiny". It was a stupid lie but on and on it went. He had a sudden fascination with the architecture of concrete steps ... the explanation is nonsense from beginning to end.

Bowes continued, talking about the lack of blood there was at Barnett's house.

[It's] a bit like Sherlock Holmes with the dog that didn't bark. What isn't there that should be there? The answer: more blood. Couldn't all the blood have been used up? No, definitely not, you'd certainly get blood. What has happened is, of course, quite obvious. Danilo Restivo changed his outer clothing and his trainers, transferring blood into the inside of his trainers, and that is what has caught him out.

Bowes stated that the bins were collected on that morning, as Restivo would have known, with him disposing of them, knowing they had been taken from the scene. Regarding Restivo's habit of lying, Bowes used the use of the computer to demonstrate Restivo lying, and did so sarcastically.

[Restivo offered] a particularly special treat – no fewer than three explanations. Version one: when interviewed in June 2004, he says he went straight to the computer room and got on with work. But police put it to him that there was no activity until much later. "Ah" he thinks – version two coming up, you'll like this one – "I didn't use it then. I had to wait for my turn to get onto it". But that did not work either. Craig Wilson's report tells him there was no activity until 10:10. Oops, that's blown it. I know, brilliant, [the tutor] Jim Todd has died, I can say I had the password. But I've got one problem left: I was asked in 2004 if I had the password, and I said I never knew it, only the tutor had the password. Ah, that's blown it. I know, I'll have to try one of my specials – a ridiculous explanation. I'll say that in 2004 I quite deliberatively lied [because of distrust of the police and journalists].

Bowes concluded that the same person had killed Claps and Barnett.

Both murders were clearly committed by the same person. "I can't explain my DNA on Elisa Claps' jumper ... I can't explain the blood on my trainers." The reason he can't explain is because it's him. The identity of the killer becomes crystal clear, doesn't it? The reason every piece of evidence points to him is because it was him.

==== Defence closing speech ====
In his closing speech for the defence, David Jeremy QC argued that Restivo was many things but was not a murderer.

I have asked myself the question – "what am I going to tell the jury" repeatedly in recent days. By the time Danilo Restivo had left the witness box, I was asking that question with expletives deleted. I doubt you'll ever see another case in which the defending barrister has so many bad things to say about his client. When you think of Restivo, good words do not fly from the pen. He is not a "my word is my bond" kind of guy. You don't think for an instant that he traps insects with his bare hands and puts them in a holdall.

I'm going to approach this [final speech] with the idea that Danilo Restivo told you many ridiculous lies. He is not, you may think, just a liar. He had a highly developed persecution complex ... not trusting the police or the media. He has undoubtedly had health issues, and hypochondria should have been inserted in the list of health problems. He is wholly unable to answer a simple question with a simple answer. He has a hair fetish, causing obviously fear and anxiety. He is never-endingly garrulous and self-pitying. He presents a deeply unattractive oddity. Restivo is a fit to any prosecution, a gift.

... In a case of this horror, it's a revealing fact that you laughed. It was completely understandable that you should do so: even in the context of this case of what he had to say was laughable. Mr Bowes watched while Danilo Restivo self-destructed, no idea of the spectacle he had made of himself. He has had months if not years to invent a story. It was almost as if he were setting out to make things worse for himself. There was a childlike quality to Danilo Restivo in the witness box, and I hope I'm not being unfair to children. The changing lie, the failure to see how ridiculous a lie is, the constant resort to illness as an excuse ... Danilo Restivo almost became a fairground attraction.

... [Restivo was] odd, unusual, deeply unsympathetic [but there's] an element of the beauty competition to a murder trial, and in a beauty competition Danilo Restivo would come last.

=== Judge sums up the case ===
Mr Justice Burnett summed up the case, reiterating how Restivo had given "long, discursive, irrelevant answers and returned to his central themes regardless of what he was asked. Many aspects were contradictory and he often lied", with this lie being his whereabouts as to where he was when Barnett was murdered. Mr Justice Burnett explained that it was the jury's decision to "consider whether there might be an innocent explanation for the lie". He also noted that the fact somebody had a fetish did not make them more likely to commit murder or another serious offence; however, he added "an inevitable inference" was to be drawn that the killer had a fetish for hair.

=== Conviction ===
On 29 June 2011, the jury deliberated for five hours, before finding Restivo guilty of Barnett's murder. When the verdict was read to the court, Restivo was emotionless, as some of Barnett's family were in tears. Tobias Jones was also present.

As the judge and jury file out, the police look jubilant. They turn round to shake each other's hands and slap backs. They've been sitting next to us in the press-box for almost two months now, and some journalists go over and congratulate them. My overwhelming feeling is one of relief: relief that the young jury has found Restivo guilty, relief that he won't be a danger for a very long time; relief for the Claps family that his true character has been revealed in all its horror.

— Tobias Jones, Blood on the Altar, recounting Restivo having been found guilty of Barnett's murder

=== Sentencing ===
On 30 June 2011, Restivo was sentenced. Prior to sentencing, victim impact statements from Barnett's daughter Caitlin and sister Denise were read to the court. Caitlin's statement talked of the horror of finding her mother's body and the police telling her she was dead.

It was at that moment that I felt as if my heart had been ripped out. I was in a state of complete and utter shock and it took months before I accepted the truth. I understood the words used but I felt that things like this don't happen to people like my mum. I used to have nightmares and flashbacks reminding me of the events of 12 November.

I also don't like going into bathrooms. I used to think that someone might be waiting for me. Now I just hold a fear of what's behind the bathroom door. It was several years before I accepted the help of a child psychologist to help me cope with what happened that day. My mum is no longer able to help me celebrate my successes and pull me through the disappointments. I will never get the chance again to tell her how much I love her and how much I now miss her.

The only person that I can fully trust and rely upon now is Terry. My mum has been taken from me. The home I had shared with my mum was now tainted with someone else's violent actions. I have not been back there since and cannot face even going near our old front door. It reminds me too much of the horror that awaited my brother and I to find.

I feel a great anger at him [Restivo]. Without him she'd still be here. How could he intrude into our safe and happy family home and then take everything from us in such a horrific and callous way? A particularly difficult day was when I first saw Danilo sat in the witness box, looking up into the public gallery. This was the first time I had come face-to-face with mum's killer. He showed no emotion and no remorse. I still do not have any explanation for why this happened to mum. What did she do wrong? Why was mum his victim?

— Caitlin Marsh, daughter of Barnett, victim impact statement, read to the court

In his summary, Mr Justice Burnett stated that Restivo had killed to satisfy "a sadistic sexual appetite" and was a "cold, depraved, calculating killer".

Danilo Restivo, you have been convicted of the murder of Heather Barnett on 12 November 2002. The evidence of your guilt was overwhelming. In the course of your trial the jury also heard evidence about the murder of Elisa Claps in 1993. Without doubt you were responsible for her murder too. It is important background because I approach this sentence on the basis that you killed before. It would be quite unrealistic to pretend that you had not.

... At least in part your motivation was sexual. You had a long-standing hair fetish, which you indulged by cutting women's hair in buses and cinemas…your planning was careful and involved a good deal of guile.

You knew an 11-year-old girl and a 14-year-old boy would find their mother butchered on the bathroom floor. This feature of the case will haunt those who sat through it and the stark reality of the destructive forces you unleashed continue to reverberate and will continue to do so down the years. 'Inhuman depravity' is an apt description.

Why you picked Heather Barnett as your victim I do not know but it's clear that you did so to satisfy a sadistic sexual appetite. The evidence in this case shows you are a cold, depraved, calculated killer.

The seriousness of this offence is exceptionally high – namely the depravity of the killing, the careful planning and preparation, its sexual content and the previous killing of Elisa Claps – drive me to the conclusion that the alternative starting point [for a minimum prison term] of 30 years would not be appropriate. I can find no mitigation in this case, none have been advanced on your behalf. There is, in my judgement, no minimum period which could be properly set – you will never be released from prison.

— Mr Justice Burnett, elements of the judge's sentencing remarks to Restivo

The judge told Restivo the murder "was of inhuman depravity" and that it would not be appropriate to issue a minimum term. He made it clear that he was sentencing Restivo as if he had killed before.

== Aftermath ==
=== Family, police, and expert reaction ===
In an exclusive interview with the Bournemouth Daily Echo, Caitlin spoke at the end of the trial, stating that she and Terry had "not really ever talked about what happened", adding that Terry found it "difficult". She stated there were times that she thought "there would never be any justice", with her emotions moving from "sadness for her mum, to anger at what Restivo has done, to bewilderment", as to why her mother was murdered and what made Restivo "choose the lady across the road". Caitlin stated that Restivo had "dragged [Barnett] into the bathroom and shut the door and it was a process of elimination that this would be the last room [her and her brother] would get to", adding it was "very cruel to calculate her children would find her". Initially thinking her mother's murder was a "random attack" and that someone had "broken into the house and just stabbed her", Caitlin stated that she and Terry "never really knew who had killed their mother" until becoming aware that Restivo was the main suspect in 2008.

Heather was feisty, with a wonderful deep laugh, and a great sense of humour. She was kind and honest, with strong, ethical principles, which she passed on to her children, Terry and Caitlin. She always worked very hard at whatever she did and she built up a business on word of mouth, for the quality of her workmanship and her flare for colour and design.

Heather loved her children very much. She would have been horrified at the cruel and callous way Danilo Restivo designed her murder and mutilation, so that her children had to find her body on return from school. Having heard the many alibis he worked out, carefully picked apart, it was obvious he was arrogant and thought only of himself. He even claimed he hugged the children as they waited on the pavement for the police to arrive, after Terry's brave 999 call. Caitlin says he did not touch them, but he managed to arrive home with Fiamma in time to be able to claim to do so, in case he had inadvertently contaminated himself with their mother's blood.

From the start, Dorset Police warned us that the murderer was forensically aware. Our sister's death was carefully planned, it would not be solved like an Agatha Christie novel, where the murderer would confess. It would only be solved through forensic evidence and so it has proved. As new tests became available, they were used and new research flowed from the work. We are grateful to the many forensic scientists who have helped to solve the case, including all the backroom staff, whose careful work on thousands of tests were represented by the expert who gave evidence in court. We know there are many thousands of items taken for testing and for evidence that have not featured in the court. Every single one had to be carefully handled and logged.

Over the eight long years waiting for someone to be charged with Heather's murder, our greatest fear was that the killer would murder someone else. It is now obvious that Dorset Police shared this concern and we are grateful for the many officers who carefully monitored Restivo's whereabouts and activity, hour after tedious hour, to keep the women and young girls in the Bournemouth area safe from his predations.

— Denise Le Voir, Statement outside Winchester Crown Court after Restivo was found guilty of Barnett's murder

Barnett's brother Ben and sister Denise spoke to On Demand News after the trial. Ben said: "Those two children still don't have a mother. This isn't going to go away just because the person who committed this has gone to prison. It doesn't really change anything in the long term, it's not going to bring her back." Denise said: "All the other years when she was a great Mum, she was a loving sister, she was a great member of the community are lost behind that last awful few minutes."

Gildo, Claps' brother, was informed of Restivo's sentence via the phone, to which he stated: "That's very good. He won't be able to hurt anyone else." DSU Mark Cooper stated after the trial: "I believe that this dangerous predator had watched over Heather for some time and carefully planned this horrendous crime." DSU James, who had retired in 2007, stated after the trial that the case was one of the "most traumatic" crimes he had dealt with, comparing it to The Godfather films. He stated how he thought Restivo was "a man who thinks he's cleverer than everyone else but isn't", and added: "He's slightly delusional, but he's not a stupid man. He looks it – he comes across as a bumbling idiot – but this is a man who clearly learned from the murder of Elisa Claps and, as a result of learning from that, he was able to think and plan much better. He needed an alibi because he didn't have an alibi for Elisa Claps; he put himself there with her. He needed to make sure he didn't have blood and other material on him. I think he was able to adapt, he was forensically aware. He's not stupid."

James stated that when Restivo had comforted Barnett's children on the day they found their mother's body, he had been "very cunning and clever", as he could then explain why Barnett's DNA was on his body, if he was asked. He stated that if Restivo had "an emotional bone in his body", he "would have phoned the police during the day to prevent those two young children finding their mother in such a horrific situation". In relation to this, Professor Elizabeth Yardley stated that Restivo would have wanted to see 'the impact of his actions on the people around the victim", which would "enhance his enjoyment and sense of power" over people. David Holmes, a criminal psychologist later stated that Restivo mutilating Barnett's body showed that his fetish was not simply hair but possibly the "cutting of hair and cutting itself, to cut someone's skin, would possibly have excited him".

=== Claps laid to rest ===
On 2 July 2011, Claps' family laid her to rest, with approximately 5,000 people attending her funeral. Her mother Filomena stated she did "not want her daughter to go back inside a church", with the funeral taking place outside.

== Restivo in prison ==
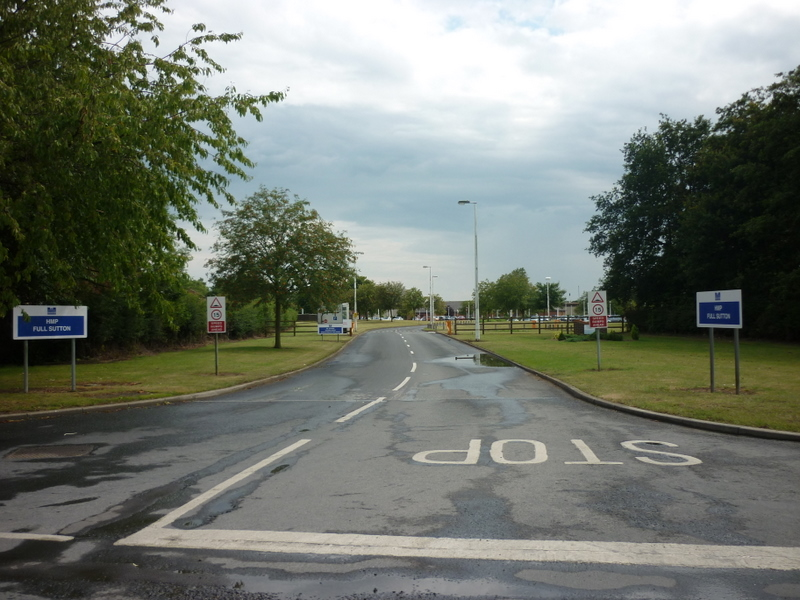
The entrance to HM Prison Full Sutton

=== Restivo appeals conviction for Barnett's murder ===
Restivo was imprisoned at HM Prison Full Sutton. In September 2011, Restivo appealed his conviction for the murder of Barnett.

=== Restivo found guilty of Claps' murder in his absence ===
On 11 November 2011, whilet in prison in the United Kingdom, an Italian court in Salerno found Restivo guilty of Claps' murder and sentenced Restivo to 30-years imprisonment. The trial was carried out in Restivo's absence due to extradition proceedings from a previously issued European Arrest Warrant halting after he appealed his conviction of Barnett's murder.

=== Restivo appeals sentence for Barnett's murder ===
In July 2012, Restivo appealed his sentence. This appeal was refused when judges ruled there was "overwhelming evidence against Restivo". Appealing against the whole life term, Restivo's lawyers argued the judge was wrong to take the Claps' murder into account when sentencing Restivo for the murder of Barnett, as Restivo had not been convicted of it at that time. On 21 November 2012, the Court of Appeal ruled in favour of Restivo and altered his minimum sentence to 40 years but said it was "highly improbable" he would ever be released.

=== Restivo appeals sentence and conviction for Claps' murder ===
On 18 March 2013, Restivo arrived in Italy to attend a court trial to appeal his conviction and sentence in absentia for the murder of Claps. On 20 March, the appeal trial began at a court in Salerno. Restivo lost his appeal and was returned to the United Kingdom to continue serving his life sentence.

=== Immigration hearing ===
In April 2014, Restivo appeared at a special immigration court in Bradford, West Yorkshire, after then Home Secretary Theresa May issued an order for him to be deported to Italy. Restivo challenged the order, claiming that he was entitled to remain in the United Kingdom, as well as stating that it would be unfair for him to be sent to Italy, as he would not be able to see his wife. Despite at the time being in prison in Yorkshire, over 320 km (200 mi) away, Restivo stated that he needed to be near to his wife, who had arthritis. As of 2014, Restivo's wife Fiamma was reportedly still living in the house she shared with Restivo. This was later confirmed in 2021, when she left the house while a BBC reporter filming a documentary was outside the address. The reporter added that she had stayed with Restivo despite his convictions. The Home Office dismissed Restivo's claim as an "exaggeration", after he stated that he would not be able to speak or even write to his wife due to how strict Italian courts were.

=== Cost of keeping Restivo in United Kingdom prison ===
The Bournemouth Daily Echo reported in 2014 that the British taxpayer would face the cost of £2 million if Restivo is kept in a United Kingdom prison for the duration of his 40-year sentence.

== Other cases potentially linked to Restivo ==
Prior and after being convicted of the murders of Elisa Claps and Heather Barnett, Restivo was and has been suspected of involvement in at least seven other disappearances or murders across Europe, including Italy, France, Spain, and the United Kingdom. In June 2011, DSU Mark Cooper stated: "We are not connecting Restivo with any other crime at this moment."

=== Disappearance of Cristina Golinucci ===
Restivo was reportedly being investigated for the disappearance of 21-year-old accounting clerk Cristina Golinucci. Golinucci was last seen in front of a convent in Cesena, where she was supposed to meet with her spiritual father, Friar Lino. Similar to the case of Claps, which occurred a year later, she disappeared near a religious place and that is why Restivo was investigated; however, there was little to no evidence to link Restivo to this disappearance.

=== Disappearance of three young women in France ===
Through the Internet, Restivo allegedly came into contact with three young women living in France, two of whom were found dead in Perpignan between 1995 and 1998, after having previously disappeared. Tatiana Andújar, a 17-year-old who lived with her family in a town located a few kilometers from Perpignan, was last seen on the evening of 24 September 1995, while leaving the small station of the city; her body has never been found. On 20 December 1997, Mokhataria Chaïb, a 19-year-old sociology student, left the station of the city and the following day her body was found naked on the edge of rue Nungesser-et-Coli, between the station itself and the neighborhood Les Portes d'Espagne. According to the medical examiners, she was not raped but her breasts had been removed (which also happened five years later to Barnett) and her anus was missing as well; these two parts of her body have never been found.

The 22-year-old Marie-Hélène Gonzalez was last seen at 8:30 p.m. on 16 June 1998, while getting off a train that had arrived in Perpignan. On 26 June, her naked body was found, with her head and hands removed. The French press linked these three crimes (whose criminals have never been identified) to the Dalí theory, based on the fact that all three women were last seen at Perpignan's train station named after Salvador Dalí; the element that gave most credence to this hypothesis was the mutilation inflicted on the two bodies found, which recalled some drawings and paintings made by Dalí and representing dismembered female figures. Based on this theory, the Anglo-Italian lawyer Giovanni Di Stefano recalled that Restivo's father was an artist who possessed a style similar to that of Dalí, so Restivo could have been inspired by these paintings to carry out his murders, in addition to the fact that one of these women had her breasts cut off, as Heather Barnett later did. Di Stefano asked the Public Prosecutor of the Tribunal of Perpignan to re-open the case; however, there is no conclusive evidence proving that Restivo was in France at the time of the murders.

=== Death of Yvonne O'Brien ===
In August 1999, the mutilated body of the 44-year-old British woman Yvonne O'Brien was located in her Majorca apartment where she was vacationing; as her breasts had been removed in a similar way to that of the Barnett case, Dorset Police connected Restivo to her murder in 2008. Di Stefano linked Restivo to the case and submitted a request to re-open the investigation for this murder, which he also connected to that of Barnett, arguing that the locks of hair found in Barnett's murder "thanks to accurate analysis, it was possible to attribute to a female who lived in the United Kingdom and took a holiday between Almeria and Perpignan, in France". Given the victim's nationality, local police had suspected that the killer was also British or had lived in the United Kingdom. Via Interpol, Dorset Police contacted Spanish police relating to evidence from both Barnett's case and from detectives in Spain; however, DI Jez Noyce from Dorset Police said there was nothing linking Restivo to her death, and the case was closed.

=== Disappearance of Erika Ansermin ===
Searching Restivo's house after either one of his arrest in 2004 and 2006 for the murder of Barnett, police looked onto Restivo's computer, locating a picture of a missing 27-year-old Italian woman, Erika Ansermin, who had disappeared from Courmayeur, Aosta, on Easter Sunday in 2003. On 20 April 2003, Ansermin disappeared after she was expected at the restaurant in Courmayeur for Easter lunch with her boyfriend and her mother-in-law. After years of investigations by the Aosta Prosecutor's Office, which never led to any conclusion, the case was closed with the declaration of presumption of death in July 2014.

=== Jong-Ok Shin ===
Jong-Ok Shin was murdered at 02.50 on 12 July 2002, while walking home from a discotheque by a man wearing a mask, who then ran away. She had been stabbed in the back three times. Omar Benguit was convicted of her murder on 31 January 2005, but at his Court of Appeal hearing in 2014, his legal team argued that Danilo Restivo was a more likely suspect for the crime, because Restivo lived nearby. and a clump of hair had been found on the pavement where Shin had been stabbed. However, the appeal judges dismissed this theory, noting that despite arguments of circumstantial similarity, there was no firm evidential basis connecting Restivo to Shin's death.

== Media ==
- How They Caught: Danilo Restivo. Crimewatch. BBC TV. 12 September 2006.
- Chi l'ha Visto? (in Italian). 2008.
- Litchfield Michael (2011). The Cutter. John Blake Publishing Limited.
- Sciarelli, Federica; Claps, Gildo (2011). Per Elisa: Il caso Claps. 18 anni di depistaggi, silenzi e omissioni (in Italian). Milan: Rizzoli.
- Jones, Tobias (2012). Blood on the Altar: In Search of a Serial Killer. London: Faber & Faber.
- Maurizio, Pierangelo (2012). L'uomo che amava uccidendo. La storia di Danilo Restivo (in Italian). Rome: Koinè Nuove Edizioni.
- Unsolved: The Man with No Alibi. BBC TV. 25 March 2018.
- Britains Most Evil Killers. Series 2. Episode 10. 22 April 2018.
- "Elisa Claps & Heather Barnett". Casefile. Episode 114. 15 June 2019.
- Trincia, Pablo; Spagnoli, Riccardo; Rafanelli, Alessia (2023). Dove nessuno guarda. Il caso Elisa Claps (in Italian). Sky Italia, Sky TG24, Chora Media.
- Pontecorvo, Marco (2023). Per Elisa – Il caso Claps (in Italian). Rai 1.
- Amendolara, Fabio; Di Vito, Fabrizio (2023). Elisa Claps, Indagine nell'abisso della Chiesa della Trinità (in Italian). Potenza: EdiMavi.

== See also ==
- Donato Bilancia
- Hair fetishism
- List of serial killers in Italy
