= Tobias Jones (writer) =

British writer

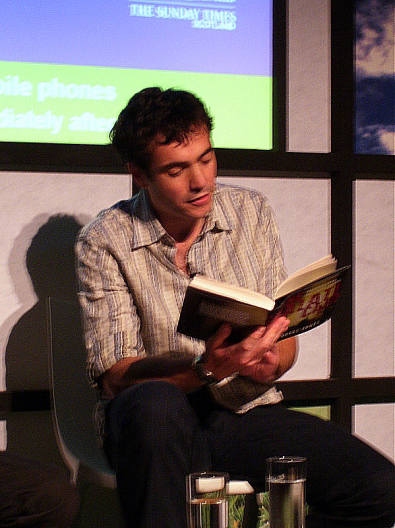
Tobias Jones in 2009

Tobias Jones is a British author, journalist, teacher and community-builder. He was educated at Jesus College, Oxford, and then worked at the London Review of Books and the Independent on Sunday. He has written various works of fiction and non-fiction, and appears regularly on British and Italian TV and Radio. He lives in Parma in Italy.

== Non-fiction ==
His first book, The Dark Heart of Italy, was a bestseller in Britain, Italy and the United States. Following its publication, he was short-listed for the Sunday Times Young Writer of the Year award.

In January 2007 he published his second book Utopian Dreams (Faber & Faber) after a year spent travelling with his wife Francesca and daughter across five communities in Britain and Italy. The book was featured on BBC Radio 4's Start the Week as well as being Book of the Week on that network.

Jones' third non-fiction book, Blood on the Altar, is a real-life mystery about the disappearance of Elisa Claps, a teenager murdered in a church in Potenza in 1993. The case took nearly 20 years to be solved, in which time her family came up against a corrupt church, organised crime and the chronic indifference of the authorities. Blood on the Altar was long-listed for the Gordon Burn prize.

A Place of Refuge was the story of Windsor Hill Wood, a Somerset sanctuary for people going through a period of crisis in their lives. Jones and his wife co-founded the community and lived there for eight years.

His fifth non-fiction book, Ultra, is about Italy’s passionate, sometimes violent football fans, the Ultras. It traces the subculture from its beginnings in the late 1960s up to the present day. The book won the CLOC/Daily Telegraph Football Book of the Year award in 2020.

In 2022, Jones published his book, The Po: An elegy for Italy's longest river, an environmental and historical examination of the Po.

== Fiction ==
The Salati Case was the first in a series of crime novels featuring Castagnetti, a bee-keeping private detective in northern Italy. The second Castagnetti crime novel, White Death, was published in 2011. The third Castagnetti novel, Death of a Showgirl, came out in 2013.

== Broadcasting ==
Jones has written and presented three TV series for Rai, the Italian state broadcaster: Ricchi d’Italia, Cervelli d’Italia and Travelogue: Destinazione Italia. He has also written various documentaries for BBC Radio 3 and BBC Radio 4. Blood on the Altar and Ultra have both been optioned by film companies, as has Jones’s Guardian Long Read about the disappearance of Yara Gambirasio.

== Prizes and nominations ==
- 2020 Winner, the CLOC / Daily Telegraph Football Book of the Year for Ultra
- 2019 Winner, Frontline Club Award for an investigation of Italian gangmasters]
- Short-listed for the Sunday Times Young Writer of the Year Award
- Long-listed for the Gordon Burn Prize

== Bibliography ==
- The Dark Heart of Italy (Faber and Faber) ISBN 978-0-571-23593-3
- Utopian Dreams (Faber and Faber) ISBN 978-0-571-23709-8
- The Salati Case (Faber and Faber) ISBN 978-0-571-22381-7
- White Death (Faber and Faber) ISBN 978-0-571-23713-5
- Blood on the Altar (Faber and Faber) ISBN 978-0-571-27493-2
- Death of a Showgirl (Faber and Faber) ISBN 978-0-571-26969-3
- A Place of Refuge (Quercus) ISBN 978-1-848-66248-3
- Ultra (Head of Zeuss) ISBN 978-1-786-69737-0

== Essays and journalism ==
Jones is a regular contributor to the British and Italian press. He has previously been a columnist for the Observer and for Internazionale.

== Charity and community work ==
In 2009, Jones co-founded Windsor Hill Wood with his wife. Now a registered charity, WHW has been managed by a new family since Jones moved back to Italy in 2017.

In 2016, Jones and his wife co-founded another charity and woodland community, this time non-residential: Shepton Mallet Community Woodland.

== Teaching ==
Jones has taught at various universities. Formerly a Visiting Fellow of Creative Non-Fiction at UEA, he was a Royal Literary Fund Fellow at Exeter University for two years. He now teaches journalism at Parma University.

He leads creative writing workshops for the Arvon Foundation, and for schools, prisons, charities etc.
