= Santissima Trinità, Potenza =

Roman Catholic church in Potenza, Italy

Coordinates: 40.638596°N 15.803519°E

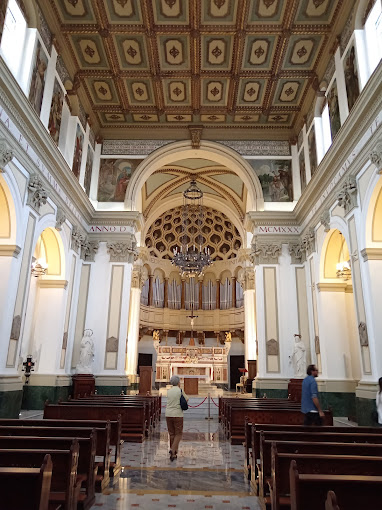
Interior of the Santissima Trinità

Santissima Trinità is a Romanesque-revival church located on Via Pretoria 123 in the city of Potenza, Basilicata, Italy. The church is now infamous as the seventeen year hiding place of the body of Elisa Claps, a young woman murdered by Danilo Restivo in 1993. The parish priest at the time of Claps's disappearance had denied the police permission to search the church despite it having been the last place where the young woman had been seen alive. The church was only searched after Restivo was arrested in England for the murder of Heather Barnett. It was closed from 2010 to 2023.

Documents point to a church at the site since 1178. Further refurbishments followed over the centuries; however, the church was razed by an earthquake in 1857. Few traces of the previous church remain; it appears that although the reconstructed building, begun in 1872, has just a single nave, the earlier structure had three. The interior decoration of the church was done mainly in the 1930s, with frescoes by Mario Prayer.
