= The Dark Heart of Italy =

2003 book by Tobias Jones

- Author: Tobias Jones
- Language: English
- Subject: Italy
- Genre: Travel, History, Politics
- Publisher: Faber and Faber
- Publication date: 2003
- Publication place: United Kingdom
- Media type: Paperback

The Dark Heart of Italy: Travels Through Time and Space Across Italy is a 2003 non-fiction book by British journalist Tobias Jones detailing his four years spent in Italy, along with discussions on the history and politics of the country. The Dark Heart of Italy was a bestseller in Britain, Italy and United States. ("The Dark Heart will ensure Italy remains an object of our fascination". Sebastian Skeaping, The Observer 2003.) Following its publication, he was short-listed for the Sunday Times Young Writer of the Year award.

An Italian translation by Chicca Galli was published by Rizzoli with the title Il cuore oscuro dell'Italia - Un viaggio tra odio e amore.
