= National Libraries of Italy =

Italy has 11 national libraries. These include:

- The Biblioteca Nazionale Centrale di Roma (Rome National Central Library), in Rome, and the Biblioteca Nazionale Centrale di Firenze (National Central Library of Florence) in Florence, which are the two central national libraries of Italy.
- The Biblioteca Nazionale Vittorio Emanuele III di Napoli (National Library of Naples), Biblioteca Nazionale Marciana di Venezia, Biblioteca Nazionale Braidense di Milano, Biblioteca nazionale universitaria di Torino, Biblioteca nazionale Sagarriga Visconti-Volpi di Bari, Biblioteca nazionale di Cosenza, Biblioteca nazionale di Potenza

In total, 9 national libraries exist, out of 46 state libraries.
