= Giuseppe D'Amico =

Italian musical artist

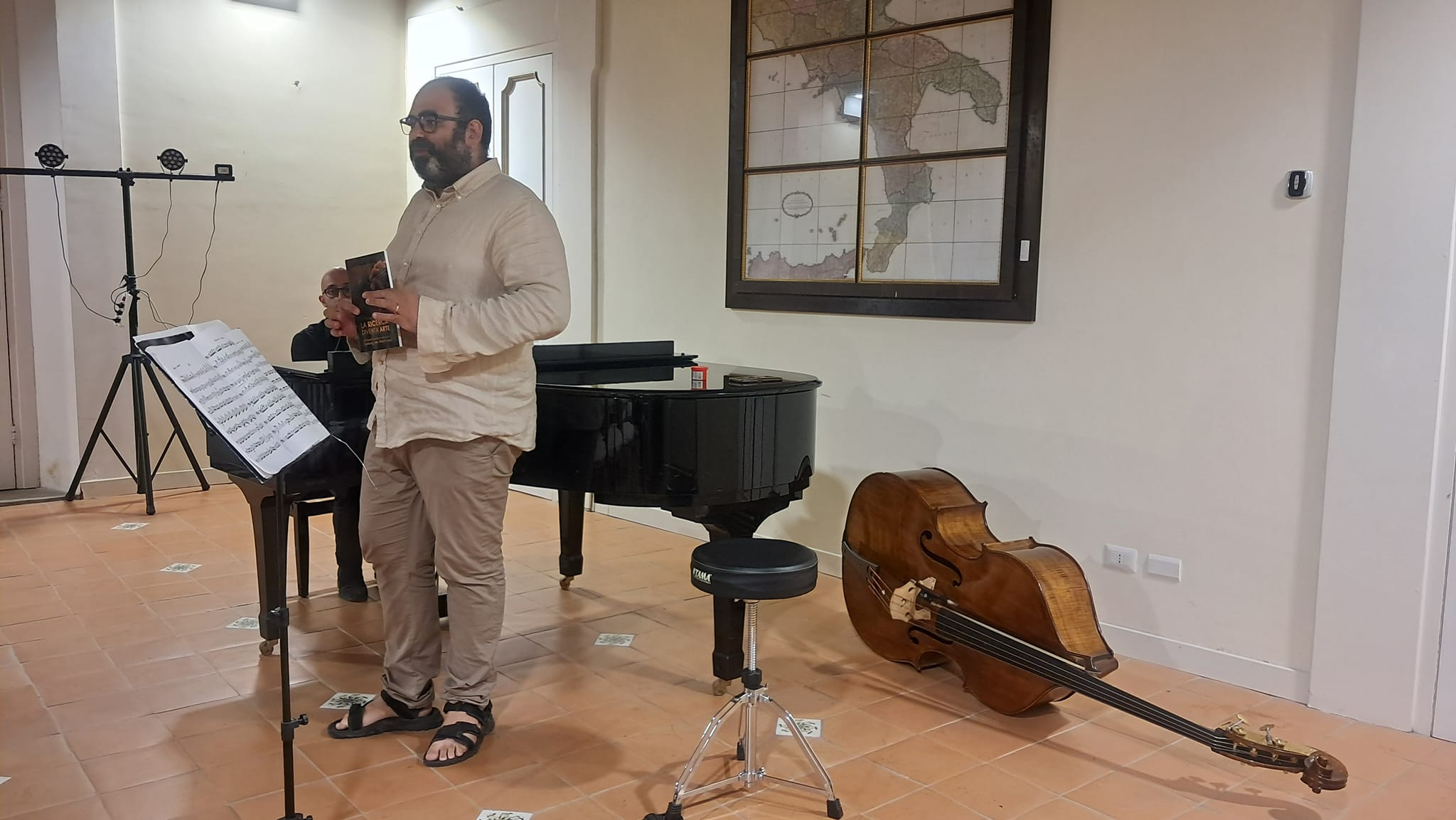

Background information
- Born: 10 June 1983 (age 43); Potenza, Italy
- Genre: classical
- Occupations: instrumentalist, composer
- Instrument: double bass

Giuseppe D'Amico (born June 10, 1983) is an Italian double bassist and composer.

== Biography ==
Obtained his degree in double bass from the "G. da Venosa" Conservatory in Potenza in 2007, and later earned a second-level academic qualification from the "E.R. Duni" Conservatory in Matera in 2012. He specialized with Maestro Franco Petracchi at the Accademia Musicale Chigiana in Siena, where he obtained the diploma of merit for three times and at the W. Stauffer Academy in Cremona.

Since 2015, D'Amico has been the principal and second double bass of Orchestra Sinfonica di Sanremo. He has collaborated with the Teatro Petruzzelli in Bari, where he has been performing as a double bassist in the orchestra since 2017. Since 2022 he has collaborated as 1st double bass of the Orchestra 131 of Potenza and the Orchestra Brutia of Consenza.

D'Amico held a master class as a double bass teacher in Lima at the National Conservatory of Music, where he also gave a concert at the Auditorium of Lima Cathedral, at the Residence of the Italian Ambassador, and at the Italian Cultural Institute in Mexico City. He has also performed at the Franz Liszt Academy of Music in Budapest, the Museum of Musical Instruments in Stuttgart, the Notre Dame de Laeken and the Sainte-Catherine Church in Brussels, as well as performances as an artist in residence in Argentina at the Circolo Italiano in Buenos Aires. In Italy, D'Amico has performed at La Scala Theatre, the Teatro Massimo in Palermo, the Auditorium Conciliazione in Rome, and abroad in Berlin, Tallinn, and Vienna.

In 2019, he composed the piece Stava lì la madre for the sacred music program Sursum Corda, organized by the Ducale Academy, under the patronage of the Italian Chamber of Deputies. His monographic album on Julien-François Zbinden, published by Da Vinci Publishing in Osaka, has contributed to the spread of the double bass tradition worldwide.

His research activities led to the rediscovery of a previously unknown Beethoven overture inspired by Macbeth, performed by the Ducale Ensemble under the baton of Maestro Shlomo Mintz, who decided to establish a lasting collaboration with D'Amico and the academy.

In 2024, D'Amico released the album I fiori dell'Accademia Live and published the book La ricerca diventa arte.

In Italy, he performed as a soloist at the Fos Festival in Lecce, the Notti Sacre Festival in Bari, the Urticanti Festival, Teatro Stabile in Potenza, the Ridola Museum in Matera, the Castle of Oriolo (CS), Padua, Lucca at the Pia Casa Auditorium, and many other venues. Among the most significant projects of his career is the collaboration with the renowned violinist Shlomo Mintz for the performance of previously unpublished works by Beethoven. This project, born from research and collaboration with the L Beethoven study center, led to the rediscovery of original scores. It represented a remarkable event in the international music scene. The concert, performed by the foundation's ensemble and dedicated to these compositions, took place in 2024 and was broadcast on Rai 5 as a national premiere.
