= Giovanni Ricca =

Italian painter (1603-c. 1656)

Giovanni Ricca (1603 – c. 1656) was an Italian painter of the Baroque period in Naples and Southern Italy.

Little is known about the painter. He trained as a follower or pupil of Giuseppe Ribera. The painting of Santa Caterina of Alessandria (circa 1630) at the Palazzo Madama, Turin was attributed by the art historian Giuseppe Porzio to Ricca. Also attributed to Ricca are a Transfiguration (1641), once in the church of Santa Maria della Sapienza, Naples, but now on display in the Palazzo della Prefettura, Naples, and an Adoration of the Shepherds from the church of Santa Maria del Sepolcro in Potenza. Also attributed to Ricca are the privately owned Martyrdom of St Ursula, St Elisabeth of Hungary, and Santa Francesca Romana (1634).
