= Santa Maria del Sepolcro, Potenza =

Roman Catholic church in Potenza, Italy

The Santa Maria del Sepolcro is a gothic-style architecture church located on Via Pretorio 109 in the town of Potenza, region of Basilicata, Italy.

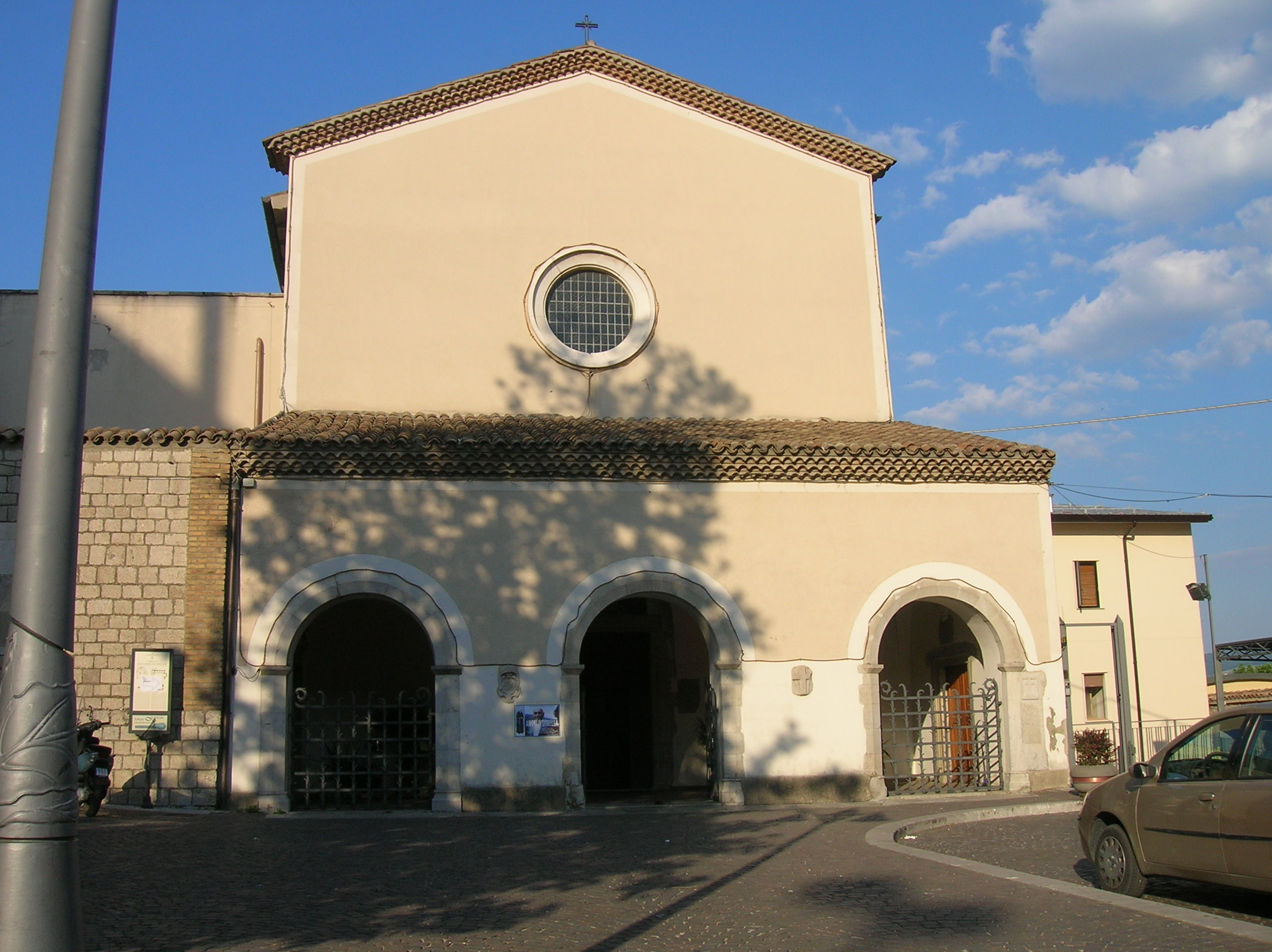
The Church of Santa Maria del Sepolcro

The church is located at the crossing of two Roman roads, and is the locale where tradition holds that the St Gerard of Potenza, then bishop of the town, transmuted water into wine.

A church was erected in the early 12th century by the Knights Templar, but was placed under the bishop in 1314. Rebuilt in 1488, and refurbished in 1652, at which time, the church was affiliated with an order of observant Franciscans.

The interior has a baroque altar (1656) with an urn putatively holding a relic of the blood of Christ. The nave ceiling has octagonal gilded wood cassettoni. The church has a 16th-century Immaculate Conception with St Francis and St Roch; a Madonna of the Graces with Saints Francis and Patrick (1582); and a Adoration of the Shepherds by Giovanni Ricca.
