= Salvatore Dierna =

Italian architect (1934–2016)

- Born: November 18, 1934; Potenza, Italy
- Died: April 18, 2016 (aged 81)
- Occupation: Architect

Salvatore Dierna (18 November 1934 – 18 April 2016) was an Italian architect, professor in Environmental Design since 1977 at the University of Rome "La Sapienza" dean of the Architecture School at its university (2000–2003), and president of the Human Sciences, Arts and Environment Federated Athenaeum from 2004 to 2007.

He debated for a long time in numerous publications and through his academic career the main problems concerning environmental design and the role played by landscape in design, critically revising the latter with persistence. He was one of the first people to diffuse in Italian culture the concepts of environmental sustainability and Environmental design, but also the concepts linked to landscape-environmental requalification strategies related to the built environment.

For many decades, he has been the scientific advisor for the architecture field in the AA.EE. Ministry University Cooperation Programs with the architecture schools of Agostinho Neto University (Angola) and Eduardo Mondlane University (Mozambique): he introduced subjects such as technological culture of the project and environmental sustainability in developing countries, trying to pursue with scientific rigor the idea of technological know how transfer to the African culture.

He has been practicing landscape and territorial planning and environmental design activities for more than 40 years, and during his career he was awarded many international acknowledgements in architectural, built environment and landscape design competitions.

Among his main works are: "Piano Paesistico-Ambientale" in Marche (1987–1990), the "Piano Territoriale Tematico: Paesaggio" in Puglia (1987–1992), the "Piano Paesaggistico e Archeologico" in the Gozo Island located in the Republic of Malta (1994–1996) and the "Piano del Parco Territoriale" in Pollino (1999–2004). On an urban scale, projects developed through the years include the "L'Infinito" project in Recanati (2003–2006), the project concerning the environmental structure and the urban green system in the Rome "Nuova Centralità" in Acilia (2004–2006), the project for "Porti di Claudio e Traiano" in Fiumicino (2005–2007), and the "Parco di Tormarancia" in Roma project (from 2005).

== Books and articles ==
Among the main articles and essays published between 1990 and 2010, the following should be highlighted:

- S. Dierna, I materiali dell'architettura e i modi del costruire, in M. Di Sivo, Facciate di pietra, Florence, Alinea, 1993.
- S. Dierna, Innovazione tecnologica e cultura dell'ambiente, in R. La Creta, C. Truppi L'Architetto tra tecnologia e progetto, Milano, Franco Angeli, 1995.
- S. Dierna, Ambiente tra una complessità e l'altra, in R. Perris, Nominare ambiente, Rome, Mancosu, 1996.
- S. Dierna, La materia luce nelle configurazioni dello spazio ambiente, in S. De Ponte, Architetture di luce, Rome, Gangemi, 1998.
- S. Dierna, in A. Battisti, F. Tucci, Qualità ed ecoefficienza delle trasformazioni urbane, Florence, Alinea, 2002.
- S, Dierna, Fabrizio Orlandi, Buone Pratiche per il Quartiere ecologico, Florence, Alinea, 2006.
- S. Dierna, Fabrizio Orlandi, Ecoefficienza per la Città Diffusa, Alinea, Florence 2009.
