= Potenza =

Municipality in Basilicata, Italy

Potenza Putenz(a) (Neapolitan)
- Comune
- Città di Potenza
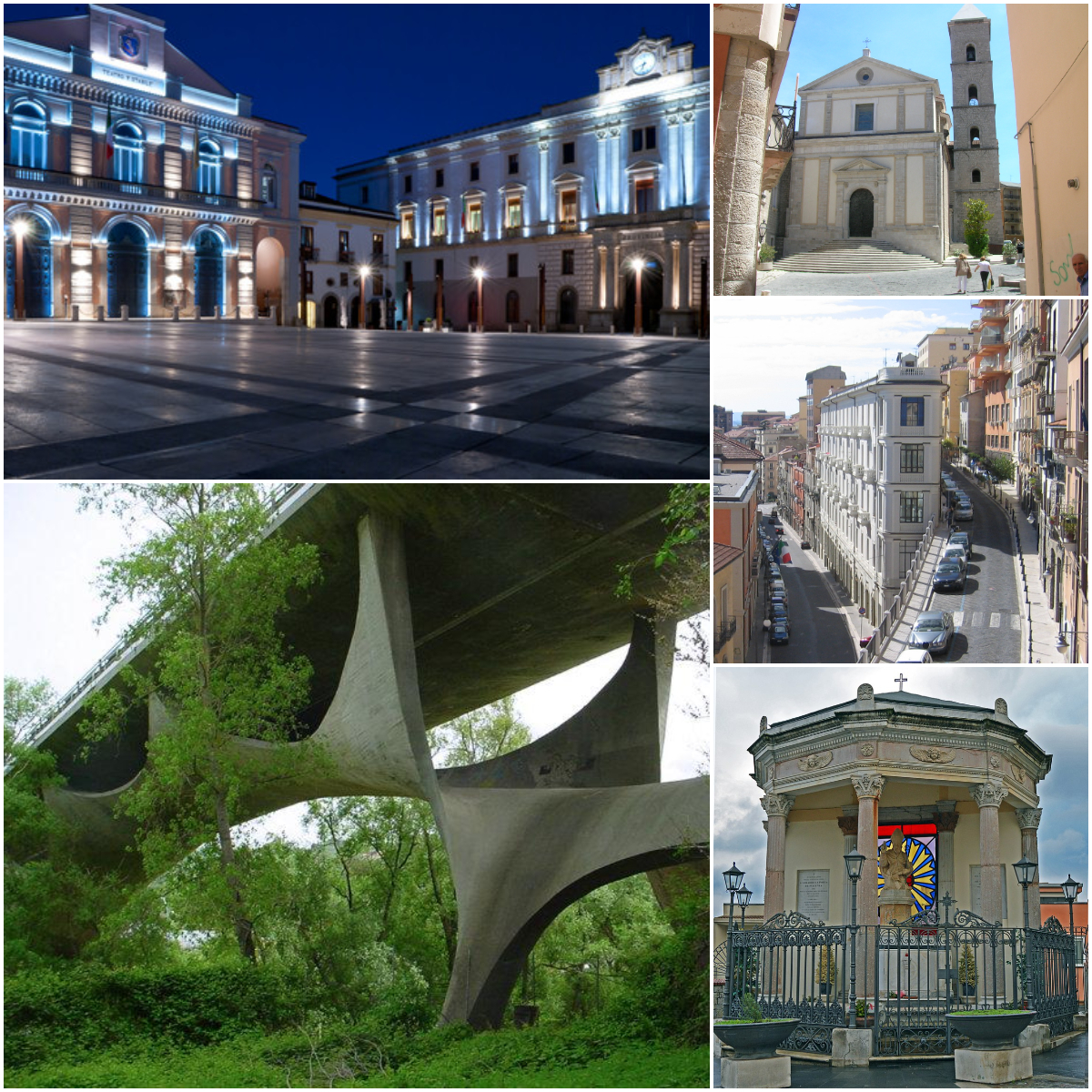
- Left: a view of Mario Pagano Square, Stabile Theatre, Potenza Province Office, and Musmeci Bridge. Right: Potenza San Gerardo Cathedral, Reale Palace, and San Gerardo Temple (from top to bottom).

- Flag Coat of arms

- Potenza within the province of Potenza

- Location within Basilicata Location within Italy Location within Europe
- Coordinates: 40°38′N 15°48′E
- Country: Italy
- Region: Basilicata
- Province: Potenza (PZ)

Government
  - Mayor: Vincenzo Telesca (PD)

Area
  - Total: 175.43 km^{2} (67.73 sq mi)
- Elevation: 819 m (2,687 ft)

Population (2026)
  - Total: 63,403
  - Density: 361.41/km^{2} (936.06/sq mi)
- Demonym: Potentini
- Time zone: UTC+1 (CET)
  - Summer (DST): UTC+2 (CEST)
- Postal code: 85100
- Dialing code: 0971
- ISTAT code: 076063
- Patron saint: St. Gerard
- Saint day: 30 May
- Website: Official website

Potenza (/pəˈtɛnzə/, also US: /poʊˈtɛntsɑː/; Italian: [poˈtɛntsa]; Neapolitan: Putenza, Potentino dialect: Putenz) is a city and comune (municipality) in the region of Basilicata in Southern Italy. Its territory is bounded by the comuni of Anzi, Avigliano, Brindisi Montagna, Picerno, Pietragalla, Pignola, Ruoti, Tito, and Vaglio Basilicata. As the capital of the province of Potenza and of Basilicata, the city is the highest regional capital and one of the highest provincial capitals in Italy, overlooking the valley of the Basento river in the Apennine Mountains of Lucania, east of Salerno. With a population of 63,403 as of 2026, it is also the largest city in Basilicata.

== History ==
=== Ancient times ===
The first settlement of Potentia (Potenza's original Latin name) was probably located at a lower elevation than at present, some 10 kilometres (6 miles) south of modern-day's Potenza. The Lucanians of Potentia sided against Rome's enemies during the latter's wars against the Samnites and the Bruttii. Subjugated during the 4th century BC (later gaining the status of municipium), the Potentini rebelled after the Roman defeat at Cannae in 216 BC; however, the Battle of the Metaurus marked the end of any Carthaginian aspirations in Italy and Potentia was reconquered by the Romans and reduced to the status of military colony.

=== Middle Ages ===
In the 6th century, the city passed to the Duchy of Benevento, which was ruled by the Lombards. Incursions by Saracen raiders menaced the city until the Norman conquest of southern Italy secured the area. In the 12th century, Potenza became an episcopal see. In 1137, the city hosted Pope Innocent II and Emperor Lothair II during their failed attempt to conquer the Norman kingdom. In 1148 or 1149, Roger II of Sicily was in Potenza to host King Louis VII of France, whom the Norman fleet had freed from the Saracens. After pillaging by Emperor Frederick II, the city remained loyal to the Hohenstaufen; as a result, it was almost totally destroyed by Charles I when the Angevin lord conquered the Kingdom of Sicily. On 18 December 1273, an earthquake further devastated the city.

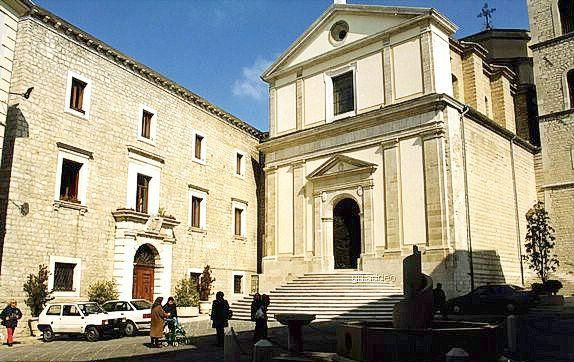
Cathedral square

=== Modern age ===
In the following years of the Late Middle Ages, the city was owned by various feudal families before the Spanish domination, during which Potenza was the site of riots against the Spaniards. In 1694, it was almost completely destroyed by another earthquake, known as the 1694 Irpinia–Basilicata earthquake.

With the declaration of the Neapolitan Republic in 1799, Potenza was one of the first cities to rebel against the king. After temporary Bourbon repression, the city was conquered by the French army in 1806 and declared the capital of Basilicata. King Joachim Murat improved the city's living conditions and administration, while some urban improvements were also introduced for the visit of Ferdinand II in 1846.

A revolt broke out in 1848 and was again put down by Bourbon forces, until a third devastating earthquake (known as the 1857 Basilicata earthquake) followed in 1857. Potenza rebelled for the last time in 1860, before Giuseppe Garibaldi's revolutionary army brought about the unification of Italy. In September 1943, the city suffered heavy Allied bombing. In 1980, another strong earthquake (known as the 1980 Irpinia earthquake) struck Potenza.

== Climate ==
In the 1971–2000 climate normals, Potenza experienced an oceanic climate (Cfb in the Köppen climate classification), failing narrowly to classify as warm-summer Mediterranean climate (Csb) because the month with the most precipitation had slightly less than three times as much as the driest month. In the 1991–2006 reference period, the summer temperature was warm enough such that the climate type is Cfa, almost Csa.

Climate data for Potenza (1991–2006)
Month	Jan	Feb	Mar	Apr	May	Jun	Jul	Aug	Sep	Oct	Nov	Dec	Year
Record high °C (°F)	20.0 (68.0)	21.8 (71.2)	23.6 (74.5)	25.6 (78.1)	29.8 (85.6)	33.0 (91.4)	36.8 (98.2)	36.8 (98.2)	33.2 (91.8)	30.0 (86.0)	21.8 (71.2)	20.0 (68.0)	36.8 (98.2)
Mean daily maximum °C (°F)	7.7 (45.9)	8.1 (46.6)	11.4 (52.5)	14.0 (57.2)	19.7 (67.5)	24.6 (76.3)	27.5 (81.5)	27.7 (81.9)	22.7 (72.9)	18.6 (65.5)	12.8 (55.0)	8.6 (47.5)	17.0 (62.5)
Daily mean °C (°F)	4.9 (40.8)	4.8 (40.6)	7.5 (45.5)	9.8 (49.6)	14.9 (58.8)	19.3 (66.7)	22.1 (71.8)	22.4 (72.3)	18.1 (64.6)	14.5 (58.1)	9.5 (49.1)	5.8 (42.4)	12.8 (55.0)
Mean daily minimum °C (°F)	2.0 (35.6)	1.6 (34.9)	3.6 (38.5)	5.6 (42.1)	10.2 (50.4)	14.0 (57.2)	16.7 (62.1)	17.1 (62.8)	13.4 (56.1)	10.3 (50.5)	6.1 (43.0)	3.0 (37.4)	8.6 (47.6)
Record low °C (°F)	−9.6 (14.7)	−10 (14)	−7.8 (18.0)	−3.6 (25.5)	0.5 (32.9)	4.0 (39.2)	8.0 (46.4)	6.8 (44.2)	1.2 (34.2)	−1.2 (29.8)	−7 (19)	−8 (18)	−10 (14)
Average precipitation mm (inches)	55.7 (2.19)	63.0 (2.48)	48.6 (1.91)	66.8 (2.63)	42.8 (1.69)	30.4 (1.20)	26.1 (1.03)	32.6 (1.28)	46.2 (1.82)	61.6 (2.43)	73.3 (2.89)	66.0 (2.60)	613.1 (24.15)
Average precipitation days (≥ 1 mm)	8.3	8.7	8.8	9.4	6.2	4.2	3.3	4.3	5.3	7.5	8.7	8.1	82.8
Average relative humidity (%)	77	75	72	69	69	67	62	64	66	72	76	78	71
Source 1: Servizio Meteorologico (precipitation 1971–2000, humidity 1961–1990)
Source 2: Climi e viaggi

== Demographics ==
Historical population
Year	Pop.	±%
1861	16,036	—
1871	18,413	+14.8%
1881	20,353	+10.5%
1901	16,163	−20.6%
1911	16,818	+4.1%
1921	18,257	+8.6%
1931	21,830	+19.6%
1936	25,103	+15.0%
1951	32,574	+29.8%
1961	43,545	+33.7%
1971	56,597	+30.0%
1981	64,358	+13.7%
1991	65,714	+2.1%
2001	69,060	+5.1%
2011	66,777	−3.3%
2021	64,850	−2.9%
Source: ISTAT

As of 2026, the population is 63,403, of which 48.3% are male, and 51.7% are female. Minors make up 13.3% of the population, and seniors make up 26.9%.

=== Immigration ===
As of 2025, of the known countries of birth of 63,282 residents, the most numerous are: Italy (60,898 – 96.2%), Romania (395 – 0.6%).

== Main sights ==
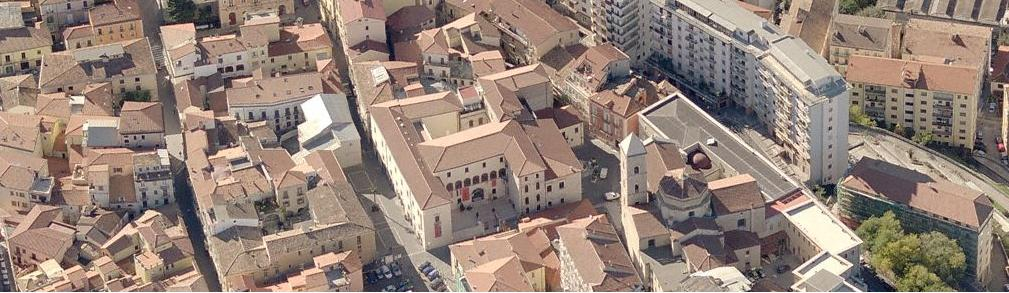
Aerial view of the Duomo and Palazzo Loffredo

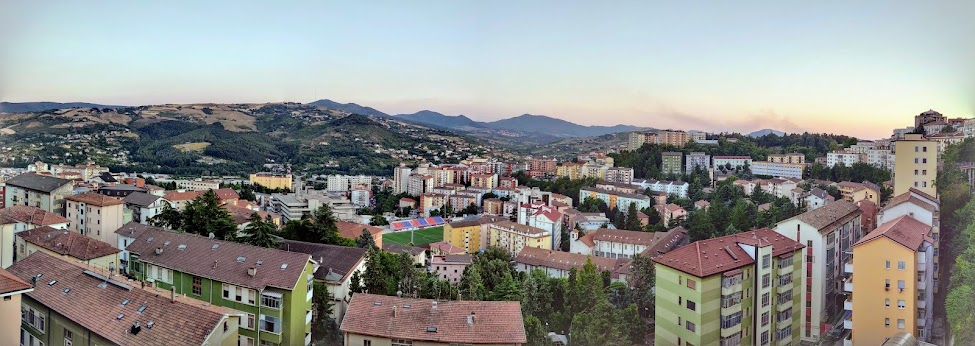
View of Potenza

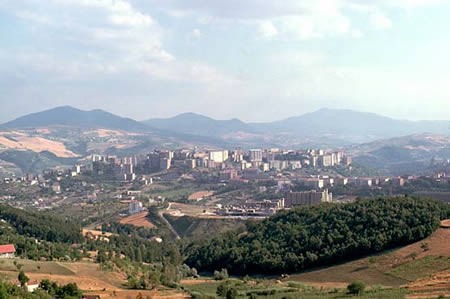
Panoramic overview of Potenza

The main sights of Potenza include:

- Potenza Cathedral: the Duomo di San Gerardo, renovated in the 18th century. The cathedral still houses the rose window and the apse from the original 12th-century structure.
- San Francesco: church founded in 1274. The portal and the bell tower date from the 15th century. The church houses the De Grasis sepulchre and a Madonna in Byzantine style (13th century).
- Torre Guevara, the last remnant of the old castle. It is now used to stage art exhibitions.
- Palazzo Loffredo, a 17th-century noble residence. It now houses the National Archaeological Museum of Basilicata, dedicated to archaeologist Dinu Adameșteanu
- Three gates of the old city walls, now demolished. The gates are the Porta San Giovanni, the Porta San Luca, and the Porta San Gerardo.
- San Michele: 11th–12th century Romanesque-style church.
- Santa Maria del Sepolcro: church.
- Ruins of a Roman villa in the Poggio Tre Galli quarter.
- Musmeci Bridge, a unique construction, monument of modern civil engineering.
- Santissima Trinità: church known for its role in the murder of Elisa Claps.

== Transport ==
=== Road ===
Potenza is located at the eastern end of the RA5 motorway, a 50 km (31 mi) branch from the A2 motorway.

=== Rail ===
Potenza is a rail junction on the main line from Salerno to Taranto, managed by FS Trenitalia. It has also a connection to Altamura and its own small metropolitan railway service, served by the Ferrovie Appulo Lucane regional company. The city's main station, originally named Potenza Inferiore, is known as Potenza Centrale.

The nearest airports are:

- Salerno-Pontecagnano QSR 85 km (53 mi)
- Foggia-Gino Lisa FOG 101 km (63 mi)
- Bari-Palese BRI 130 km (81 mi)

=== Escalators ===
With the city centre situated at the top of a steep hill, escalators provide a form of public transport in Potenza. The largest is Santa Lucia Escalators (Italian: Scale Mobili Santa Lucia), which is approximately 500 m (1,600 ft) long and connects Potenza's historic centre with a residential neighbourhood to the west by descending 100 m (330 ft) into a valley. Potenza's public escalator network is the largest in Europe and the second largest in the world after Tokyo.

== Notable people ==
- Gerard of Potenza (died 1119) – bishop of Potenza recognised as a saint by the Catholic Church
- Giovanni Andrea Serrao (1731–1799) – intellectual and churchman
- Ascanio Branca (1840–1903) – politician who was a multiple-time deputy and minister
- Domenico Montesano (1863–1930) – mathematician
- Tanio Boccia (1912–1982) – film director
- Emilio Colombo (1920–2013) – prime minister of Italy (1970–1972) and senator for life
- Salvatore Dierna (1934–2016), architect
- Ruggero Deodato (1939–2022) – film director
- Wally Buono (born 1950) – Canadian football head coach Canadian Football League like Calgary Stampeders and BC Lions
- Luciana Lamorgese (born 1953) – politician
- Gianfranco Blasi (born 1958) – politician, essayist, and poet
- Cecilia D'Elia (born 1963) – politician
- Donato Sabia (1963–2020) – former middle distance runner
- Francesco Colonnese (born 1971) – former football player
- Giovanni Frezza (born 1972) – film actor
- Danilo Restivo (born 1972) – double murderer
- Vito Postiglione (born 1977) – racing driver
- Roberto Speranza (born 1979) – politician
- William Cutolo (1949–1999), also known as "Billy Fingers" and "Wild Bill", powerful labour racketeer and underboss for the Colombo crime family
- Giuseppe D'Amico (born 1983) – double bassist and composer
- Rocco Mazzola (born 2005) – racing driver

== International relations ==
=== Twin towns and sister cities ===
Potenza is twinned with:

- Amatrice, Italy
- Denver, United States
- Focșani, Romania
- Osuna, Spain
- Tunja, Colombia

== Bibliography ==
- De Grazia, Paolo; Romanelli, Pietro; Moscati, Ruggero; Emiliani, Clarice (1935). "Potenza". Enciclopedia Italiana (in Italian). Rome: Italian Encyclopedia Institute. Archived from the original on 14 October 2018 – via Treccani.
- Quartana, Pino Antonio; Trotta, Marco (16 September 2018). "Potenza-Matera, confronto sulla storia". Potentia Review (in Italian). Archived from the original on 3 December 2024.
