= San Francesco, Potenza =

Church in Potenza, Italy

Coordinates: 40.6388°N 15.8027°E

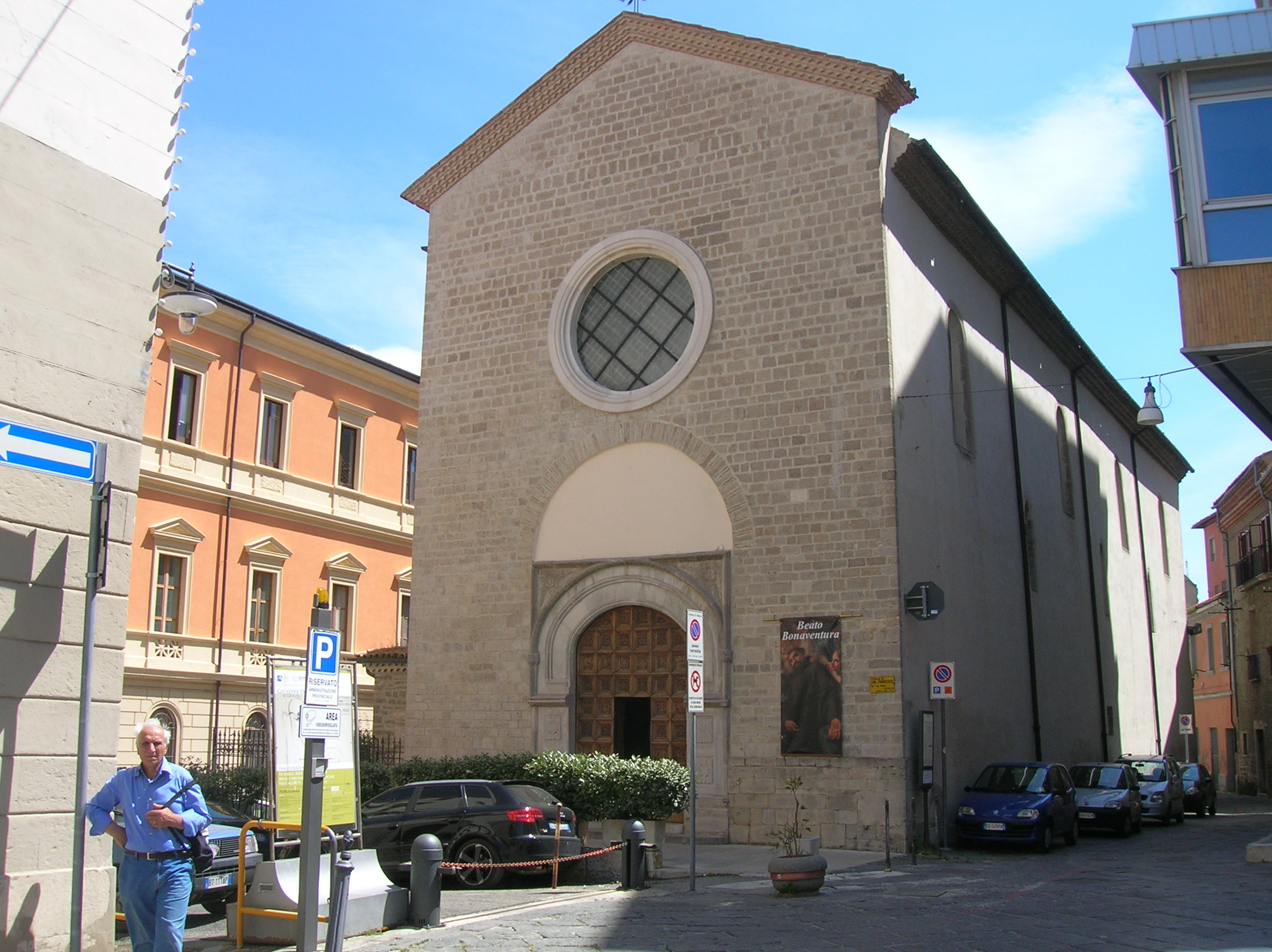
Exterior of the church

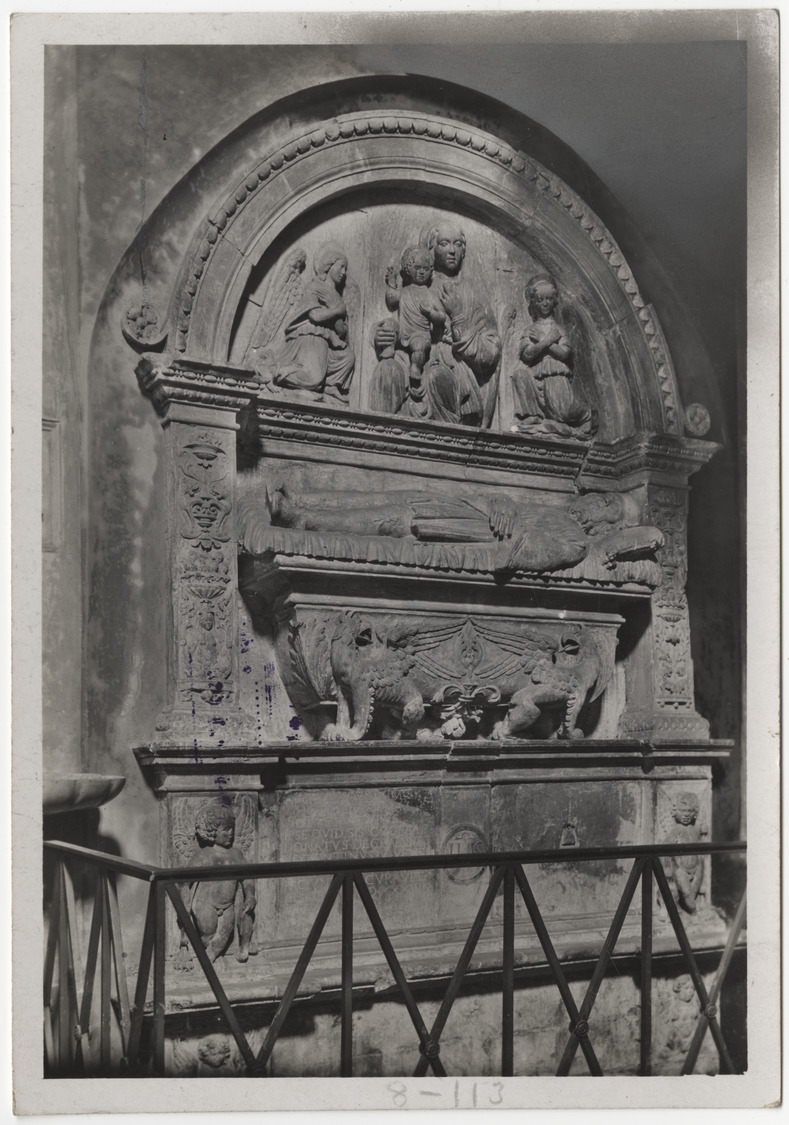
Sepulcher by Donato de Grasis

San Francesco is a romanesque-Gothic-style Roman Catholic church in the city of Potenza, region of Basilicata, Italy.

== History ==
The church was erected in 1274 with a tall Gothic facade with a large circular window. The 16th-century portal has the monogram of St Bernardino da Siena.

Among the artworks are a fresco depicting Martyrdom of St Sebastian (1545-1566) by Giovanni Todisco of Abriola. On the right wall is a stone tomb of Donato De Grassis (1534). The walls have 14th-century frescoes of St Clare and St Francis.
