= Musmeci Bridge =

Musmeci Bridge Ponte Musmeci
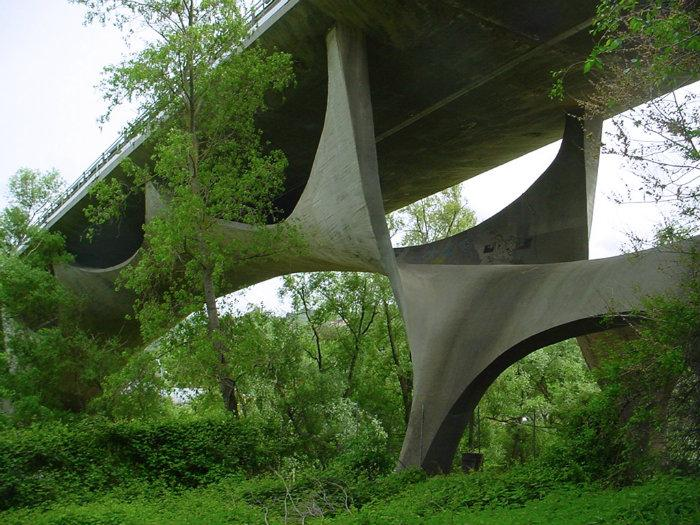
- Ponte Musmeci (Potenza)
- Coordinates: 40°38′N 15°49′E
- Crosses: Basento and Potenza Centrale railway station
- Locale: Potenza, Italy
- Official name: Ponte dell'industria
- Other name: Ponte sul Basento
- Heritage status: Monument of cultural interest

Characteristics
- Design: Sergio Musmeci
- Material: Reinforced concrete
- Total length: 560 m (1,837 ft)
- Width: 16 m (52 ft)

History
- Architect: Sergio Musmeci
- Constructed by: Edilstrade Forlì-Castrocaro
- Construction start: 1971
- Construction end: 1976
- Construction cost: 920,000,000 ITL
- Opened: 1976

Location
- Interactive map of Musmeci Bridge

The "Viadotto dell'Industria" (Industry viaduct), also known as "Bridge over the Basento" river or Musmeci Bridge, is a bridge in Potenza, Basilicata, Italy, that connects the Potenza city center exit on the Sicignano-Potenza motorway with the main access roads in the southern part of the city.

Designed by the Italian engineer Sergio Musmeci in 1967, and built between 1971 and 1976, the bridge perfectly incarnates Musmeci's architectural theories. The structure cost about 920,000,000 Italian liras (equivalent to €4,000,000 in 2016).

The structure's uniqueness is due to its construction: it is made of only one membrane of reinforced concrete (about 30 cm (1 ft) thick) molded to form four contiguous arches. The concrete sheet is shaped into a "finger-like" structure, which supports the whole bridge, and it is also used as a pedestrian walkway. The unique structure of the bridge has been the subject of several studies and discussions on its structure and form.

The bridge was built without using prefabricated elements. Edilstrade Forlì-Castrocaro company constructed the bridge.

Plans and drawings of the bridge are collected in the "Musmeci Sergio and Zanini Zenaide archive" which in 1997 was declared of great historical interest by the archival superintendents of Lazio. Then in 2003, it was referred by the Ministry of Heritage and Culture as an example of architecture from the 20th century in the MAXXI (The National Museum of the 21st Century Arts, Rome). In 2003, the bridge was declared a "monument of cultural interest" by the Ministry of Heritage and Culture.

== Cultural impact ==
The bridge inspired the virtuosic piano piece The Arching Path by Christopher Cerrone.

== See also ==
- Rinaldo Capomolla. "Il ponte sul Basento di Sergio Musmeci. Il progetto della forma strutturale prima dell'avvento del calcolo automatico". In Alfredo Buccaro; Giulio Fabricatore; Lia Maria Papa (eds.). Atti del Primo Convegno Nazionale di Storia dell'Ingegneria. Napoli, 8-9 marzo 2006 (Tomo II) (PDF) (in Italian). pp. 1143–1152.
- Fausto Giovannardi (2010). Sergio Musmeci. Strutture fuori dal coro (PDF) (in Italian). Giovannardierontini.
- Luigi Spinelli (2007-10-17). "When infrastructure becomes landscape". Domus.
