= Potenza metropolitan railway service =

Computer Railway System

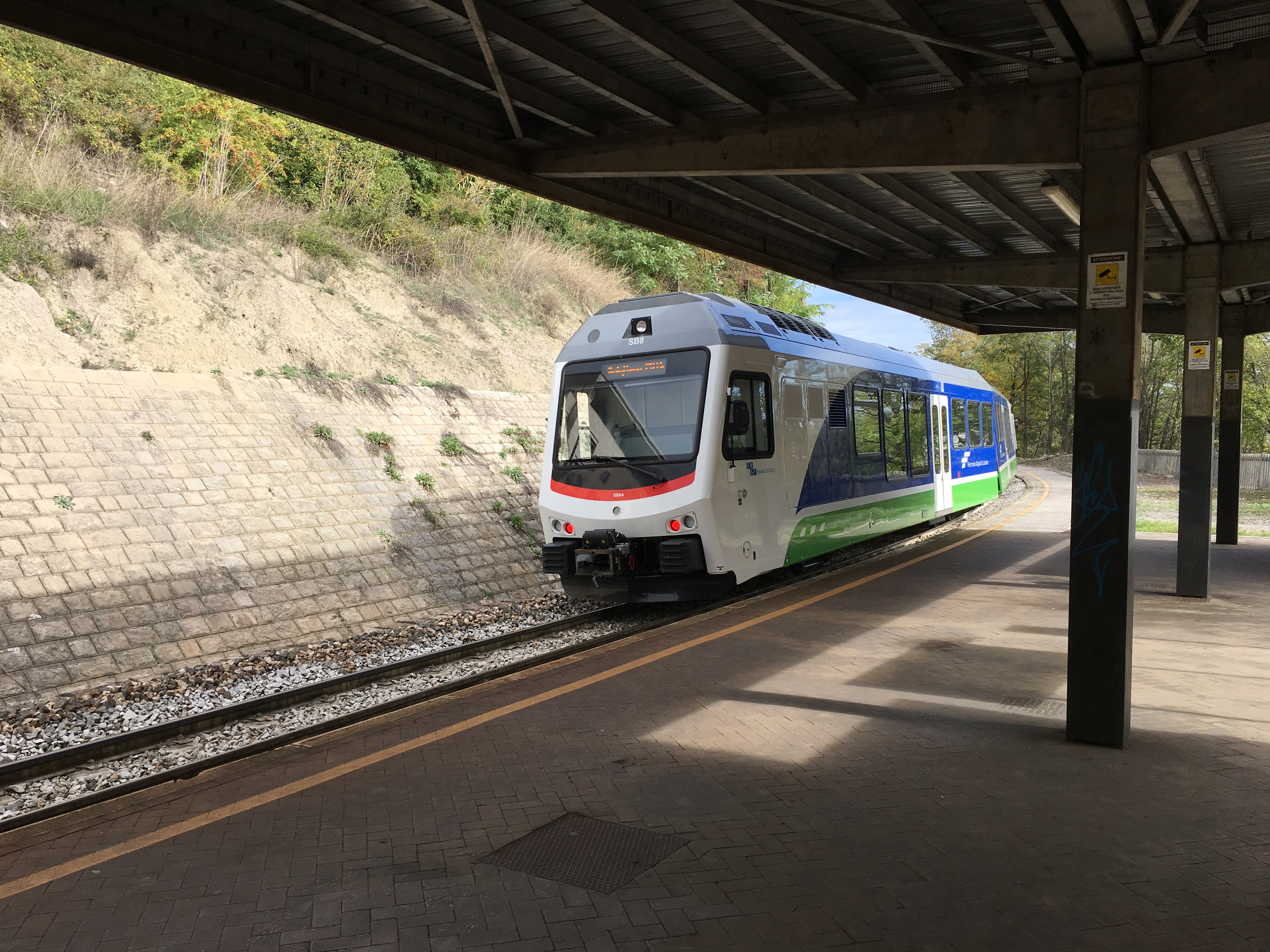

Overview
- Locale: Potenza
- Transit type: commuter rail
- Number of lines: 1
- Number of stations: 11
- Daily ridership: 400 per day (2008)

Operation
- Began operation: 2007
- Operator: Ferrovie Appulo Lucane

Technical
- System length: 20 km (12.4 mi)
- Track gauge: 950mm
System map

The Potenza metropolitan railway service is a commuter rail system operated by Ferrovie Appulo Lucane. It serves the city of Potenza in the region of Basilicata, Italy.

== History ==
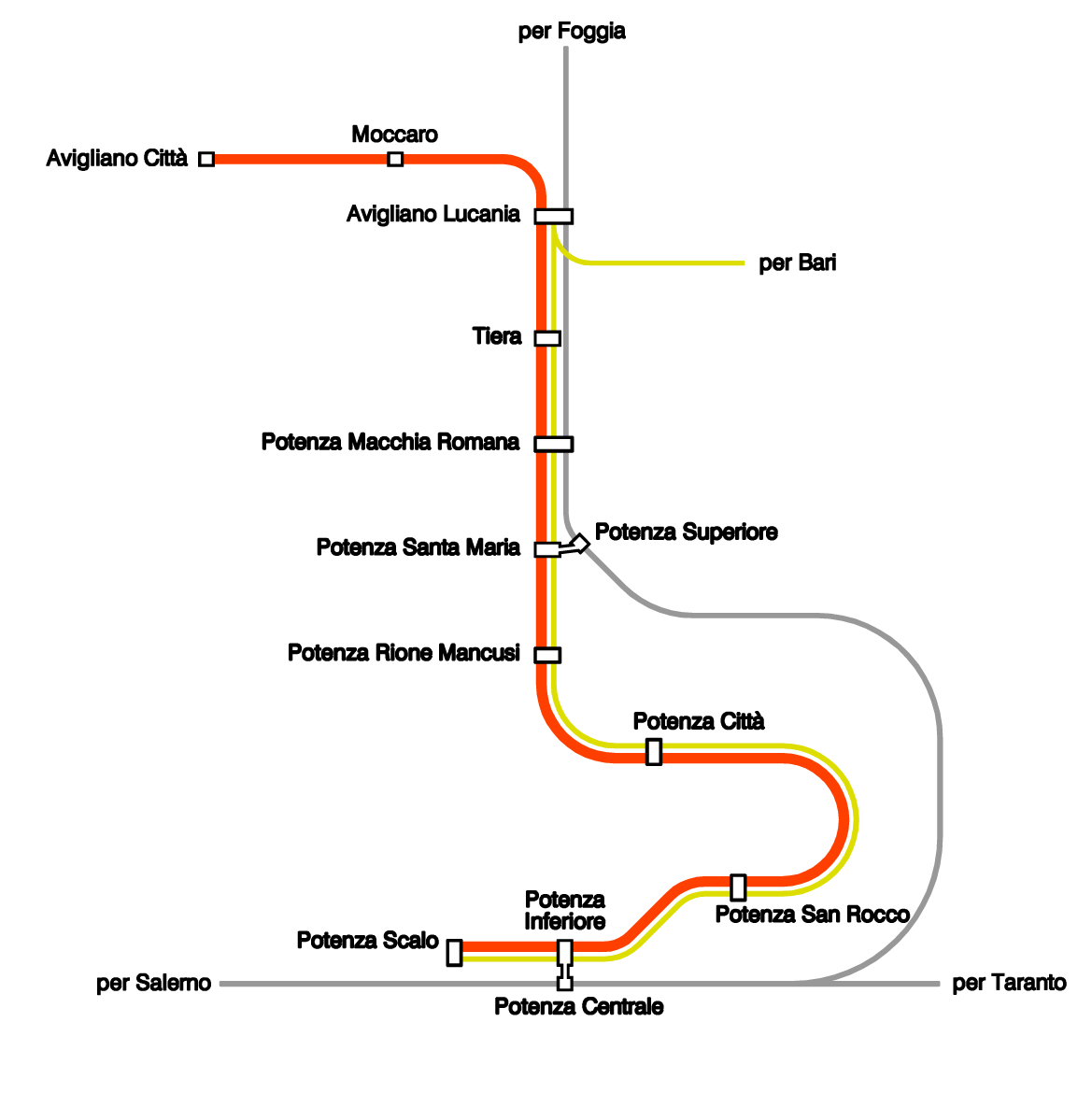
Map of route in red, with RFI main lines shown in grey

The opening of the service took place on 1 November 2007 on a 950 mm narrow gauge line built in the 1930s from Potenza to Avigliano.

== Future projects ==
Improvement of the service began in 2015, with projects including elimination of level crossings, increased frequency, modernisation of stations and the construction of a new terminus station Gallitello.

== See also ==
- List of suburban and commuter rail systems
