= Domenico Montesano =

Italian mathematician (1863–1930)

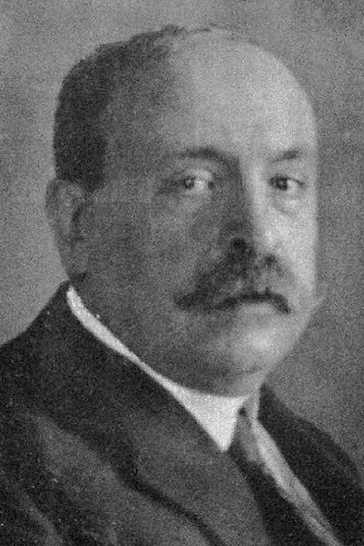
- Born: Domenico Alfonso Emmanuele Montesano; 22 December 1863; Potenza, Basilicata, Italy
- Died: 1 October 1930 (aged 66); Naples, Campania, Italy
- Citizenship: Kingdom of Italy
- Education: University of Rome, 1884
- Occupation: Mathematician
- Years active: 1885–1930
- Notable work: Linear congruences; Conical bilinear complexes
- Board member of: Accademia Pontaniana
- Parents: Leonardo Antonio Montesano (father); Isabella Schiavone (mother)
- Awards: Order of the Crown of Italy: Grand Officer; Order of Sts. Maurice & Lazarus: Commander
- Scientific career
- Known for: Algebraic geometry; Projective geometry
- Fields: Mathematics
- Workplaces: University of Bologna; University of Naples Federico II

Domenico Alfonso Emmanuele Montesano (Potenza, 22 December 1863 – Naples, 1 October 1930) was an Italian mathematician. He influenced and developed theory on linear congruences and on conic bilinear complexes.

== Family life ==
Domenico was born in Potenza, Italy in 1863 to Leonardo Antonio Montesano and the duchess Isabella Schiavone of Aragona, Italy. They had nine children, five boys and four girls. Two sons became lawyers, two became medical doctors, and Domenico studied mathematics. The daughters studied through to high school, learning music and painting. Domenico's brother, Giuseppe Ferruccio Montesano, became one of the founders of psychology and child psychiatry in Italy.

== Education and career ==
Domenico was a disciple of Luigi Cremona and Giuseppe Battaglini and graduated in Rome in 1884; after a brief period of improvement and assistantship, in 1885, at the age of twenty-two, he became a professor of projective and descriptive geometry at the University of Bologna. In 1893, he became a full professor in the same chair at the University of Naples Federico II and later in 1895 to the teaching position in higher geometry. For many years he also held the chair of higher mathematics. In 1903 he was Dean of the Faculty of Mathematical Sciences.

He was a member of the Royal Academy of Sciences of Naples, and in 1921 he became president of the Academy of Physical and Mathematical Sciences of Naples. He also served on the board of the Accademia Pontaniana and a member of the Palermo Mathematical Circle. He was honored as Commander of the Order of the Crown of Italy and Knight and Officer of the Order of Saints Maurice and Lazarus.

He became a member of the Freemasons at a lodge in Bologna, during Cremona's term there as Venerable Master (and thus could personally conduct the initiation ceremonies of his protégé), with Giosuè Carducci as Secretary.

He died in Naples on 1 October 1930.

== Works ==
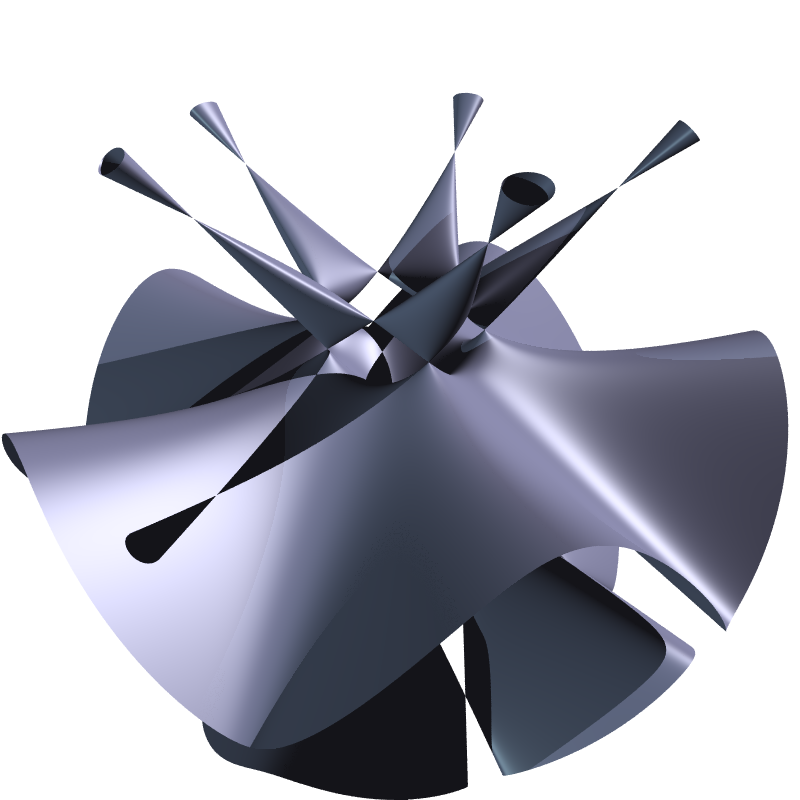
Togliatti surface, a quintic surface with 31 crunodes (the maximum possible)

He made important contributions to the theory of Cremona transformations and handled the linear congruences and conical bilinear complexes. He discovered 30 new rational surfaces of the 5th order. He was the author of over fifty scholarly publications relating to Cremonian address geometry. Montesano's studies that mostly interested the international academic environment concerned the geometry of the straight line and the Cremonian transformations. Among his major works was a Treatise on Projective geometry. Some of his theories are still the object of interpretation and study by contemporary mathematicians.

He also worked on fifth order algebraic surfaces, more commonly referred to as quintic surfaces.

== Notes ==
- The Legacy of Mario Pieri in Geometry and Arithmetic
- Gaetano Scorza, "Commemoration of the resident partner Domenico Montesano read by the corresponding member Gaetano Scorza", in Rendiconti of the Academy of Mathematical Sciences of Naples, 3rd Series, Naples, 1930.
- Roberto Marcolongo, "In memory of Prof. Domenico Montesano", in Bulletin of the Italian Mathematical Union, Rome, 1931.
- A. Tummarello, in Mathematics Bulletin, Florence, 1931.
- Francesco G. Tricomi, "Italian mathematicians of the first century of the unitary state", in Memories of the Academy of Sciences of Turin. Class of physical, mathematical and natural sciences, series VI, t. 1, 1962–66, p. 1-120.
- "Brief History and Future Perspectives of the Institute of Mathematics of the Faculty of Sciences of the University of Naples", Rendiconti of the Academy of Physical and Mathematical Sciences of Naples, 1978, pp. 7–44.
- G. Gambini and L. Pepe, "Raccolta Montesano", Library of the Mathematical Institute of the University of Ferrara, Ferrara.
- Commemoration of the partner Domenico Montesano, in Rendiconti of the Academy of physical and mathematical sciences of Naples, s. 3, XXV (1931)
