= Santa Lucia Escalators =

Walkway system in Potenza, Italy

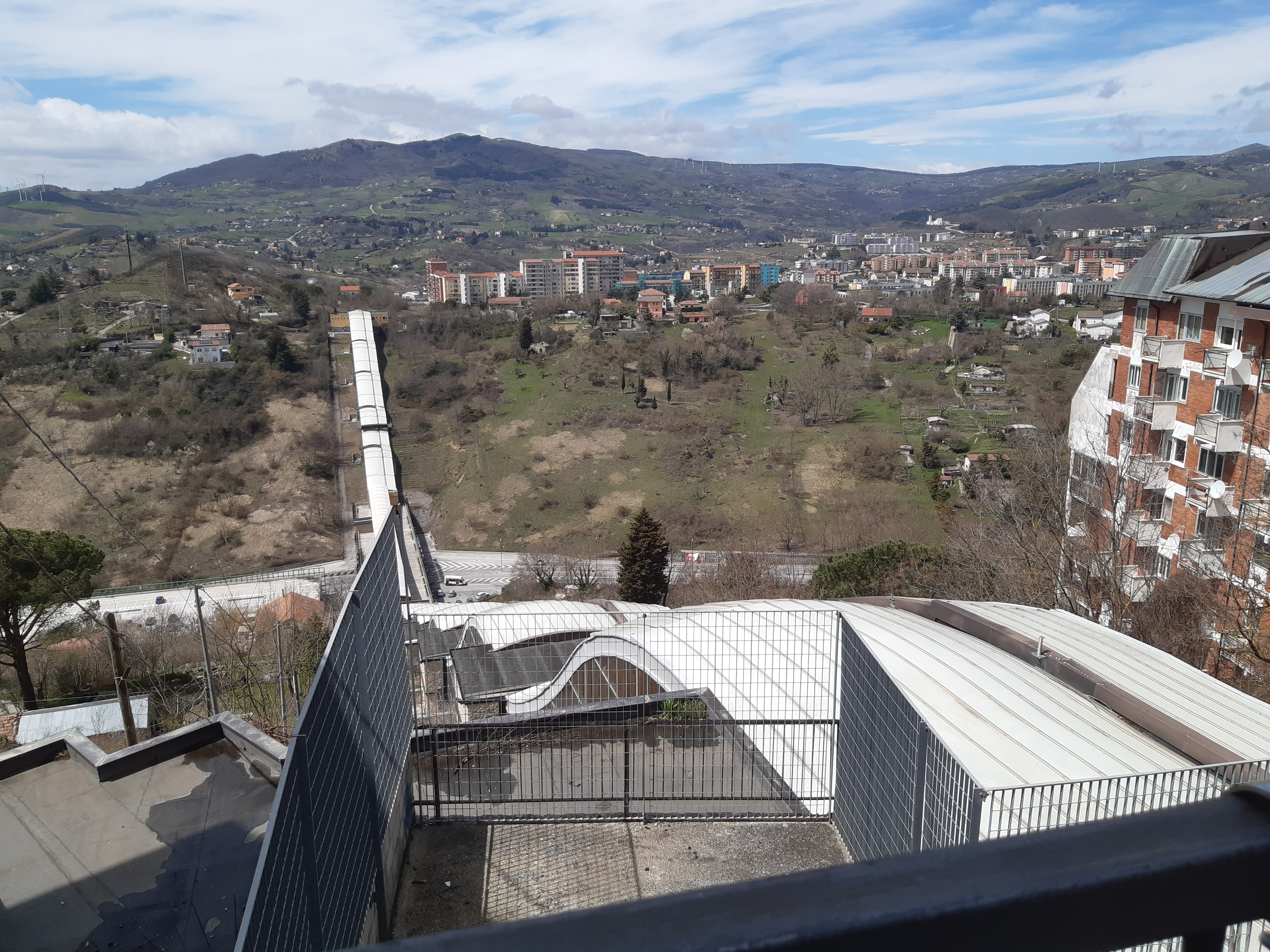
the entire escalators. view from via mazzini towards via tammone

The Santa Lucia escalators, in Potenza, are an extensive system of escalators that connect the Poggio Tre Galli, Cocuzzo and Verderuolo districts with the historic center of the city. Inaugurated in 2010, they extend for 600 m and the Potenza system of escalators (1.3 km in total) has been made by these the longest in Europe; in addition to the Santa Lucia there are the Prima escalators (viale Marconi-via del Popolo, inaugurated in 1994 and 430 m long), via Armellini (via Armellini-via Due Torri, inaugurated in 2008 and 50 m long) and Basento (inaugurated in 2021, from Potenza Centrale station it leads to the Mobility Center near the Court). In the world, the Potenza escalators are second only and slightly to those of Tokyo.

== History and characteristics ==
The project also includes the Equipped Bridge on Viale dell'Unicef for a total of 16.5 million euros. A car park has been built near the same equipped bridge, which can be used free of charge from 1 October 2019.

The construction of the bridge started in 2000, with the first stone realized in October.

== Path ==
The Santa Lucia escalators cross the entire valley of the same name that divides the areas of Poggio Tre Galli, Verderuolo, Cocuzzo, Gallitello, Murate, Montereale and the historic center. The Prima escalator crosses Viale Dante, Via Vespucci and Piazza Vittorio Emanuele II (Rione Libertà) and then flows south of the city's main square, Piazza Mario Pagano. The escalator on Via Armellini crosses Via Caserma Lucania, while the Basento escalator includes an underpass that starts from the bus terminal on Viale del Basento, the project of which was completed in 2012.

== Daily traffic ==
Between 2010 and 2014 the escalator system had reached 15,000 passages per day, up to 25,000 at peak days, but later dropped to below 6,000 a day due to a malfunction.

== In mass culture ==
=== Cinema ===
- The longest night of the year - 2022
