= San Michele Arcangelo, Potenza =

Roman Catholic church in Potenza, Italy

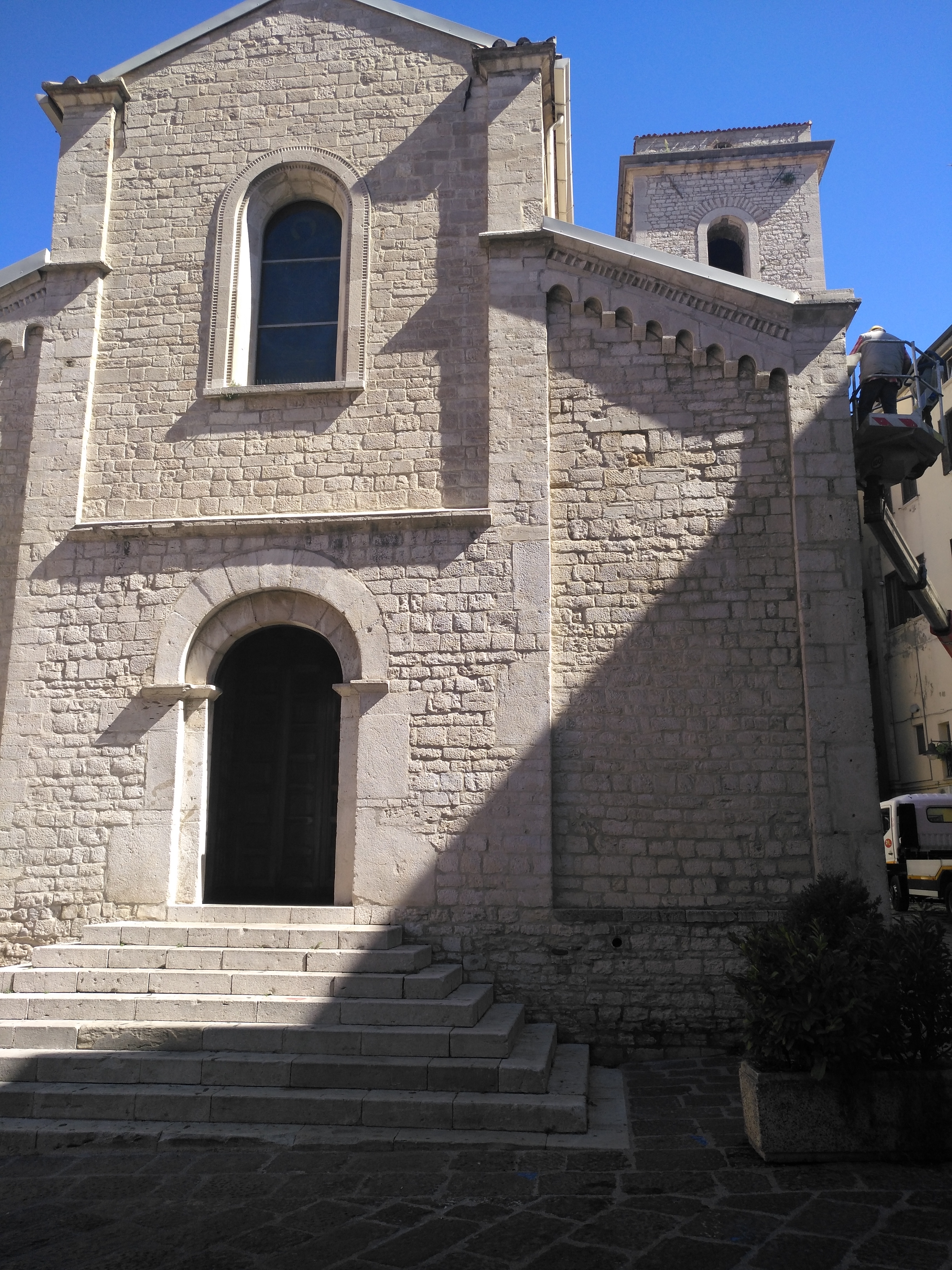
The Church of San Michele Arcangelo

San Michele Arcangelo is a romanesque-style Roman Catholic church in the city of Potenza, region of Basilicata, Italy.

== History ==
A church at the site is first documented in 1178, however, floor mosaics, likely from the 5th century, uncovered in the church suggest that a late Roman structure was likely here before then. As was common for many Lombard churches, it was dedicated to St Michael Archangel. The stone portal has a sculpted relief of the Madonna and Child with some Franciscan Order symbols.

== Gallery ==
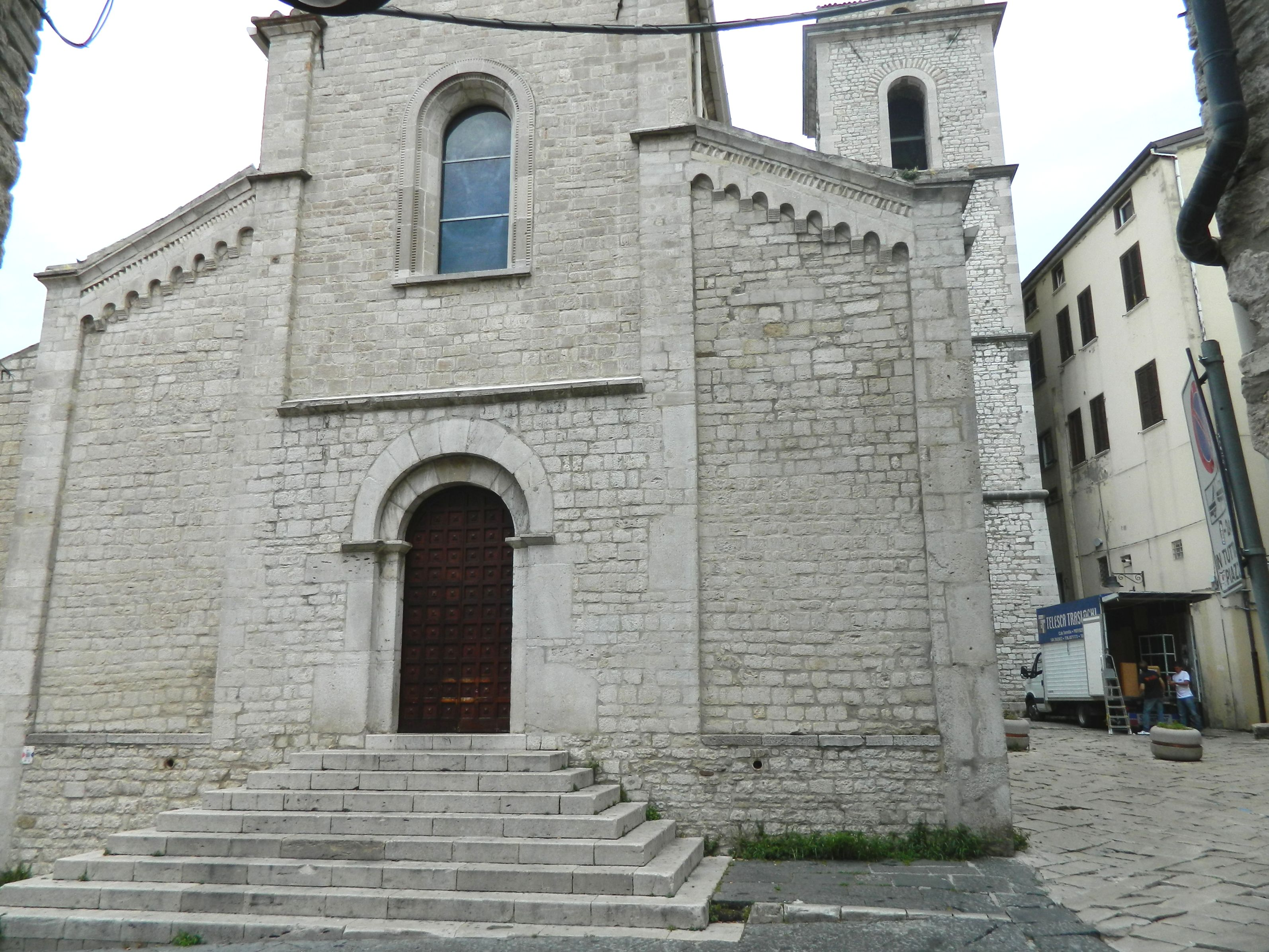
Facade of church

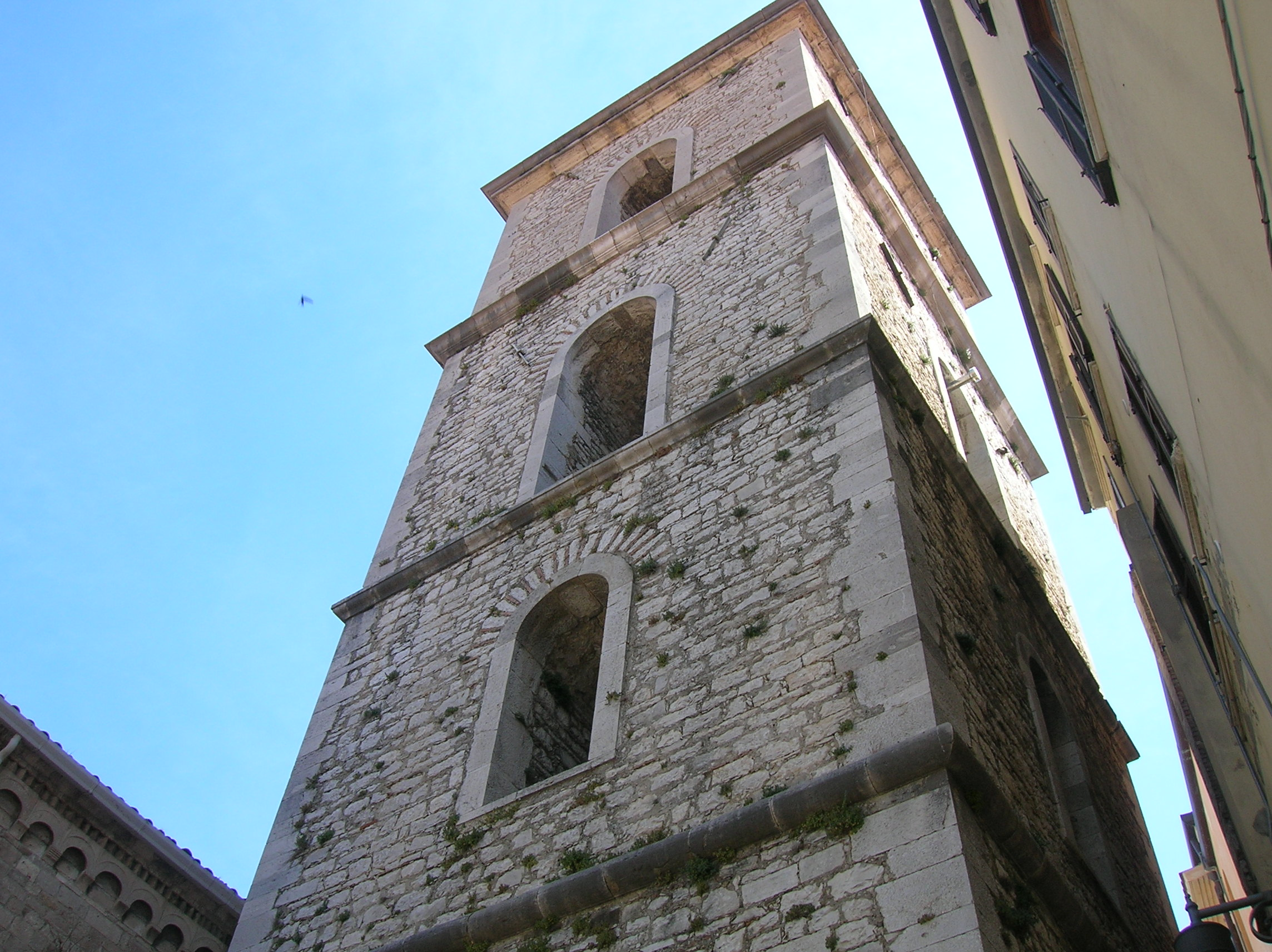
belltower

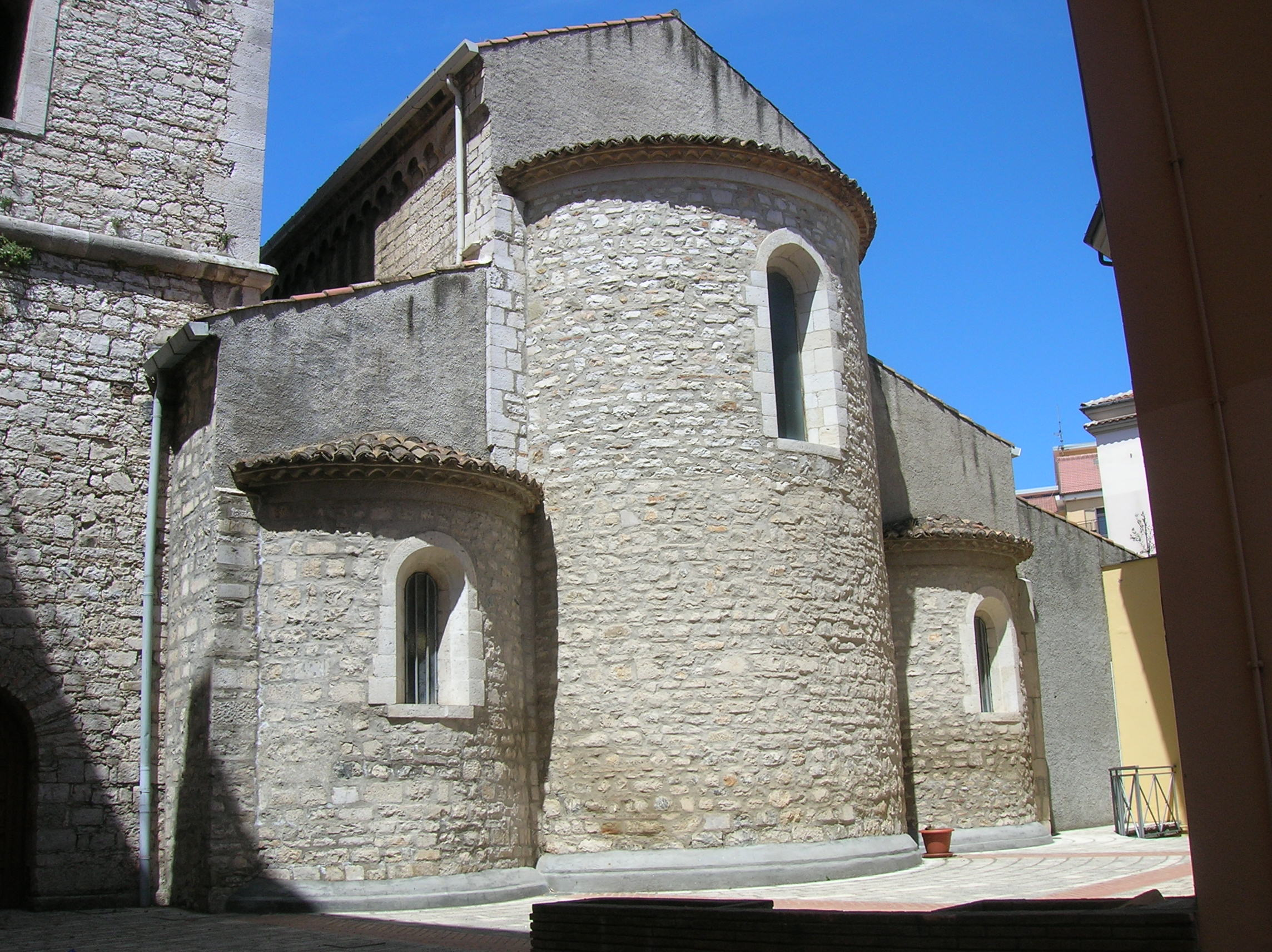
Romanesque apse

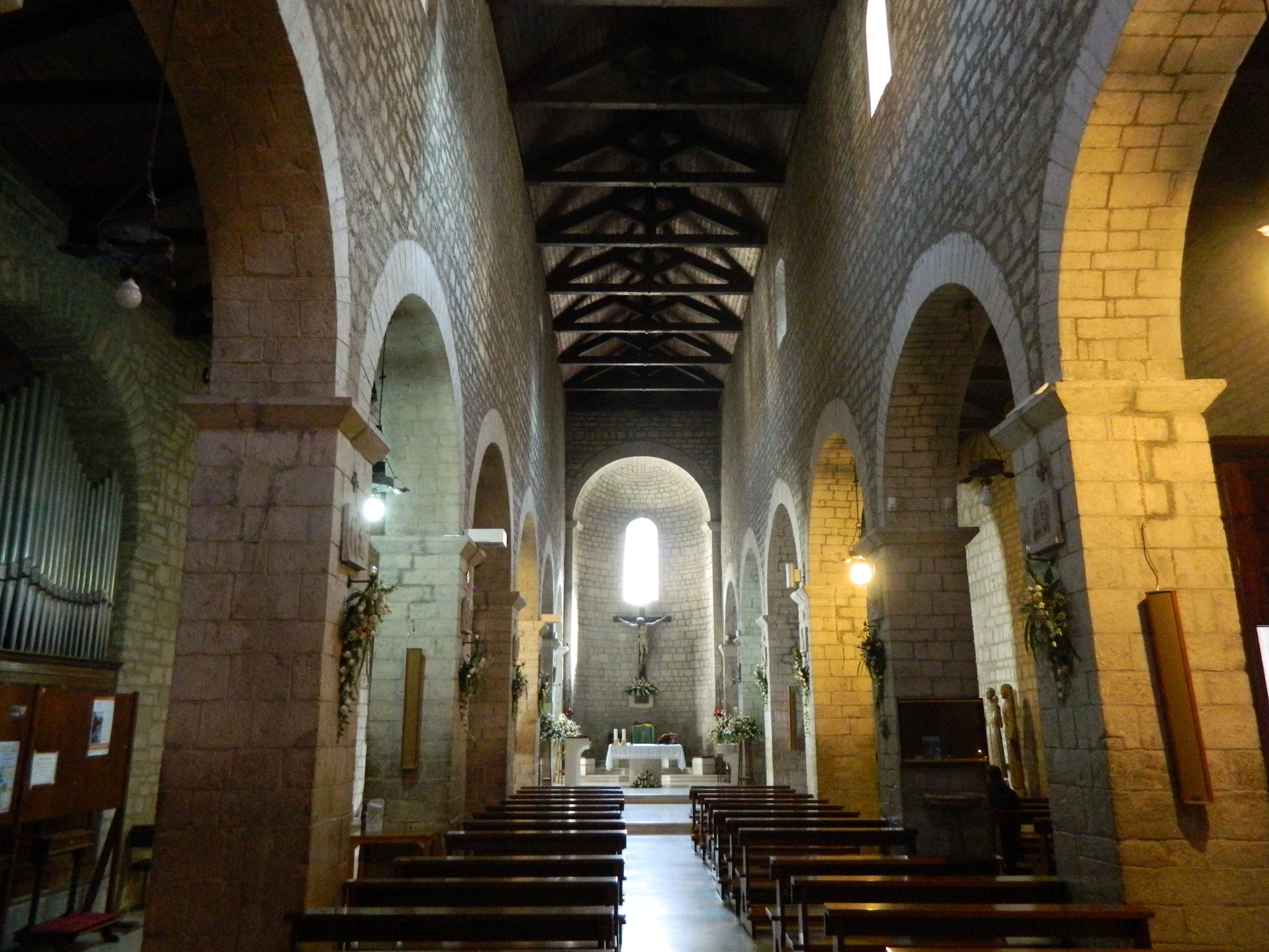
Interior of church
