= House of Music (Stuttgart) =

German music museum

- Haus der Musik
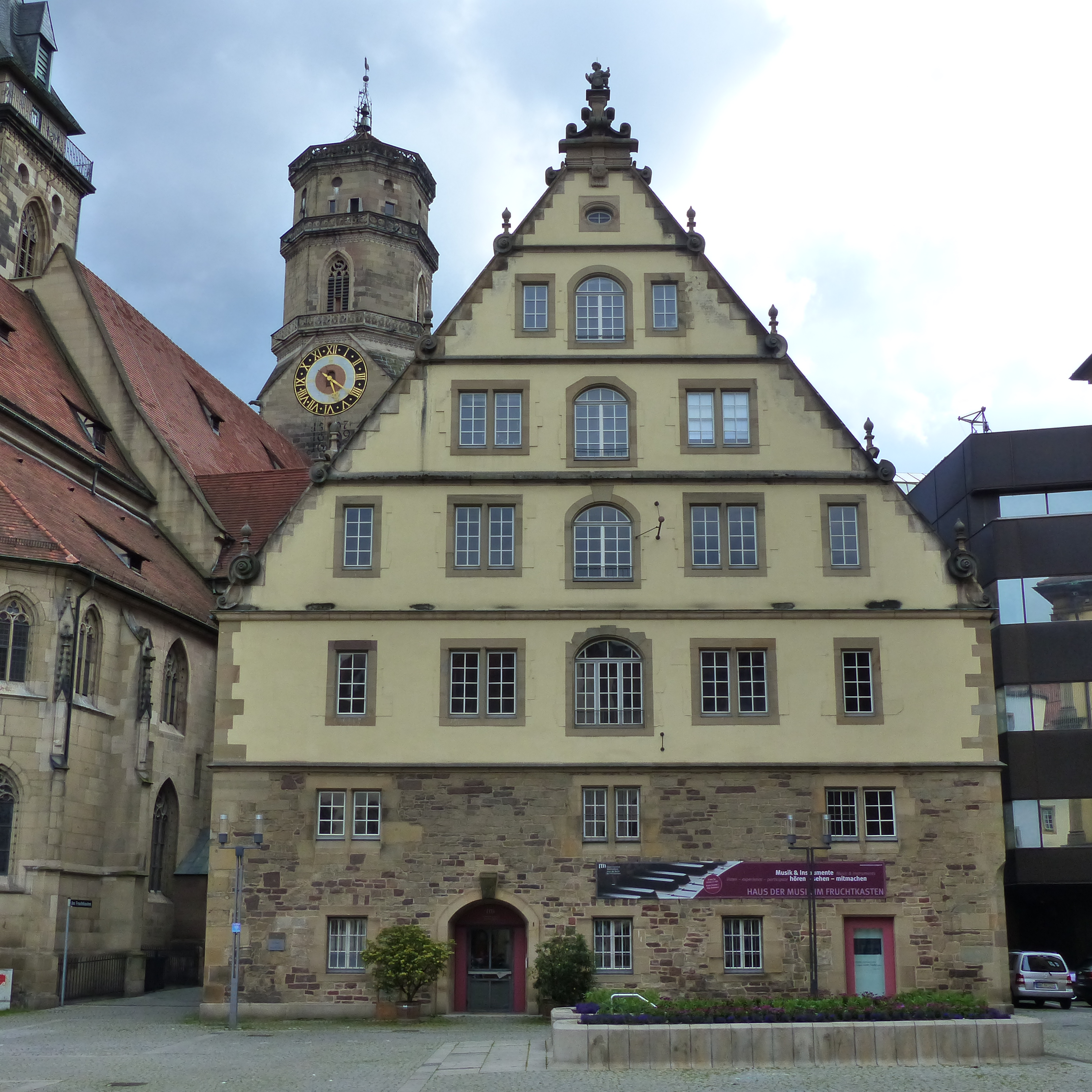
- The Haus der Musik has been located in the historic Fruchtkasten at Stuttgart's Schillerplatz since 1993
- Location: Stuttgart, Germany
- Coordinates: 48°48′20.39″N 9°12′46.82″E
- Type: Music museum
- Website: www.landesmuseum-stuttgart.de/ausstellungen/schausammlungen/musikinstrumente/

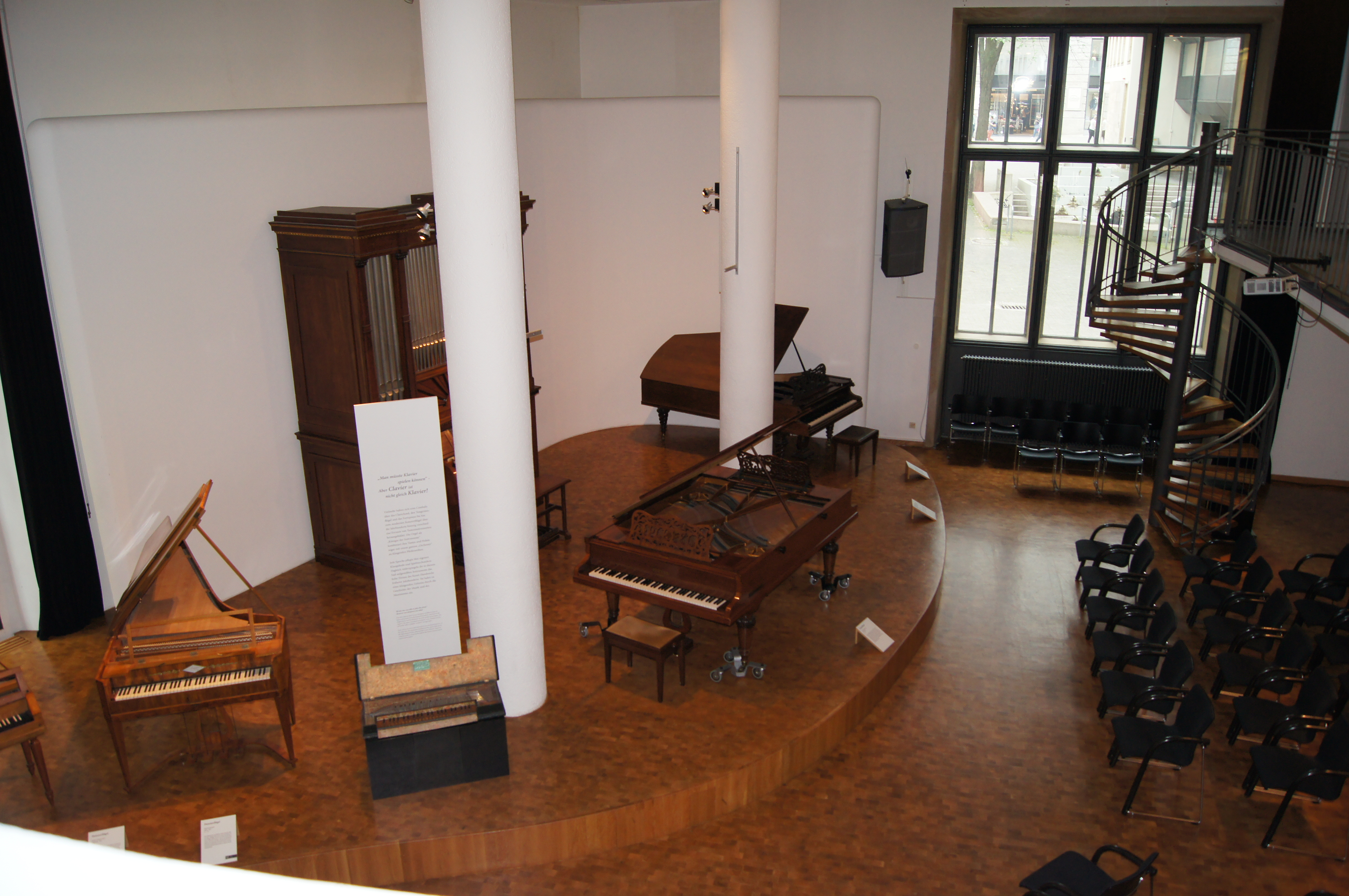
Event space for concerts, featuring a salon organ and a double grand piano.

The House of Music (Haus der Musik) is a music museum operated by the Landesmuseum Württemberg. It is housed in the Fruchtkasten, located on the Schillerplatz in downtown Stuttgart.

The Landesmuseum Württemberg includes a collection of musical instruments as part of its exhibitions, housed in the Haus der Musik in the Fruchtkasten building at Schillerplatz in Stuttgart. Initially, the collection focused on keyboard instruments. However, since the 1970s, it has been expanded to include other orchestral instruments dating back to the 19th century. To enhance the understanding of these instruments, the museum hosts small concerts and organizes activities for children.

== Collection (selection) ==
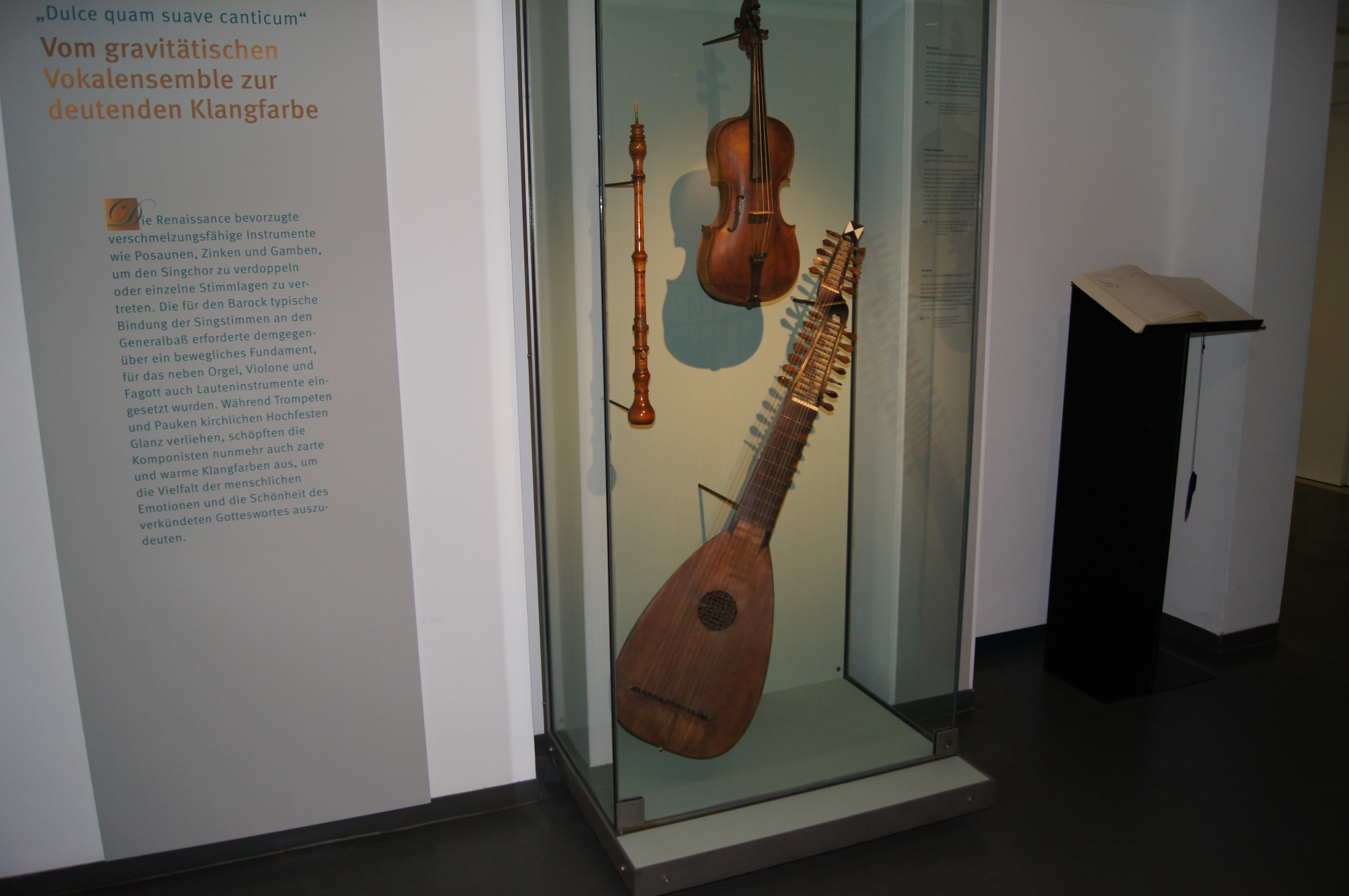

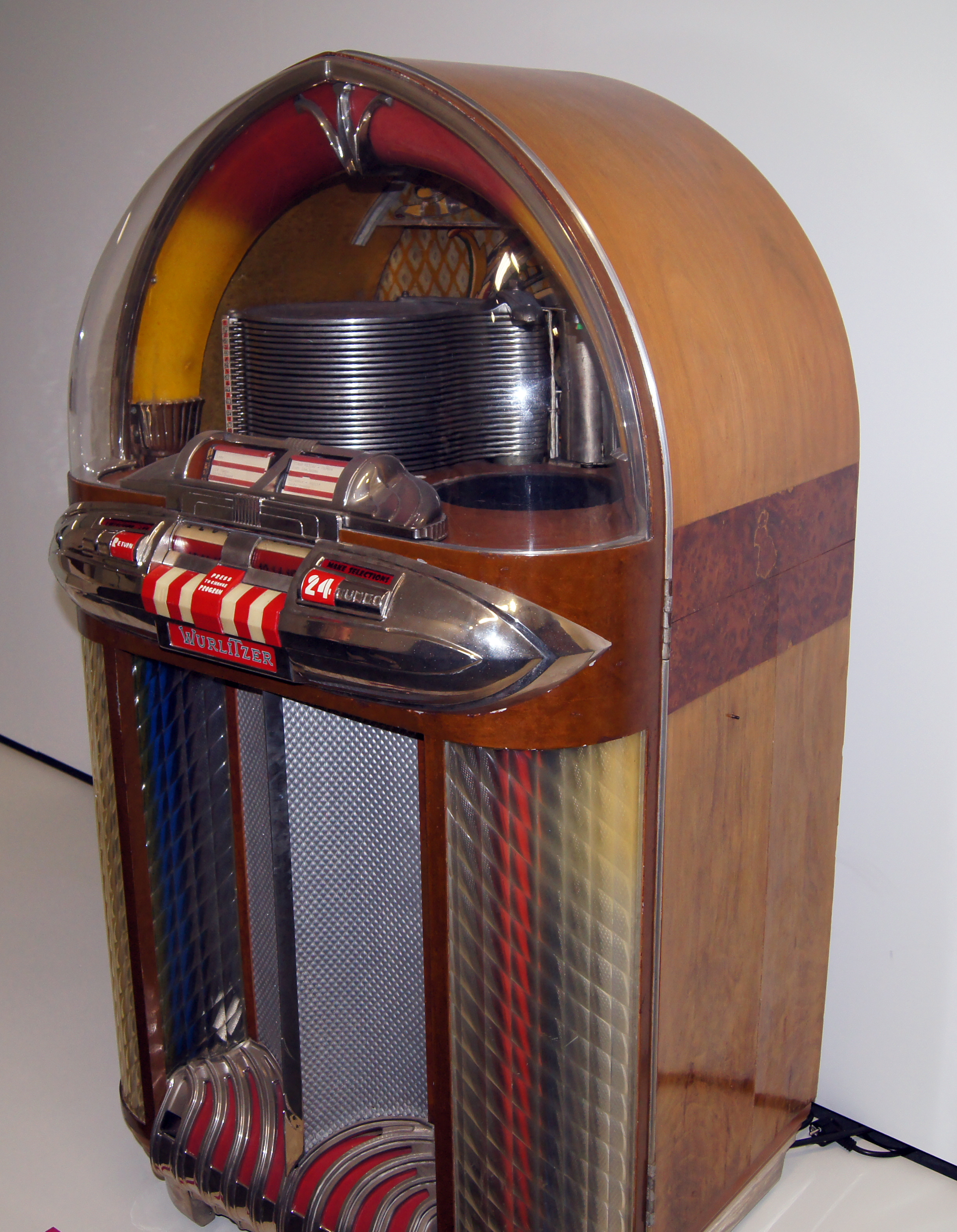

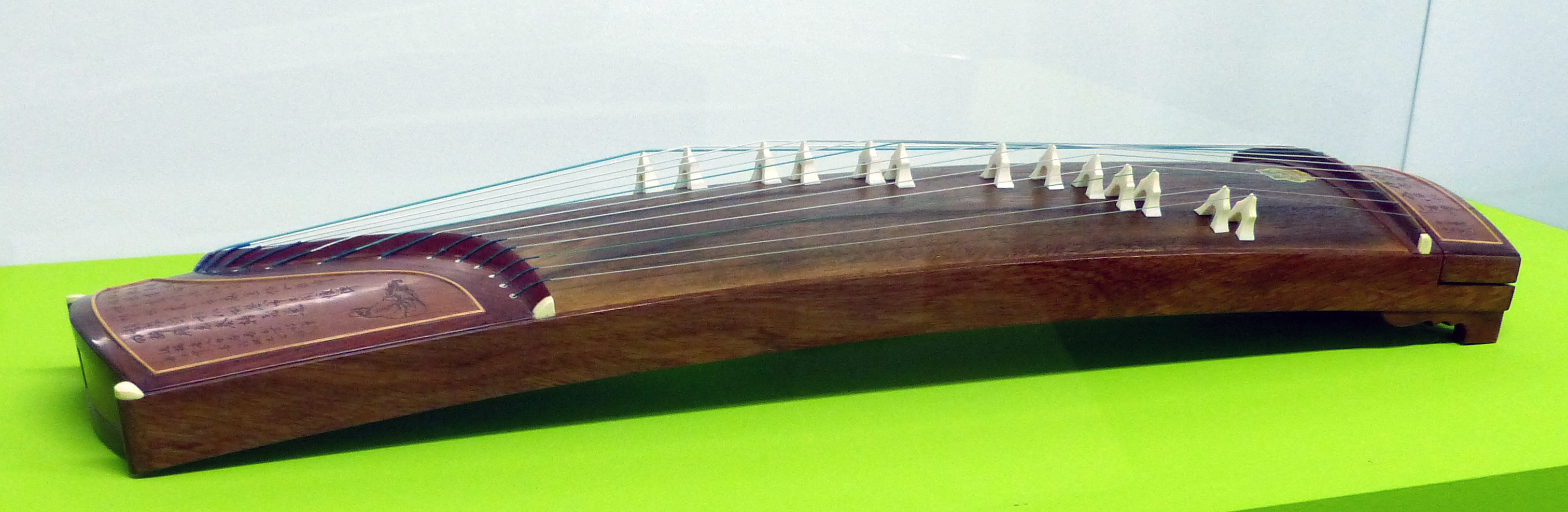

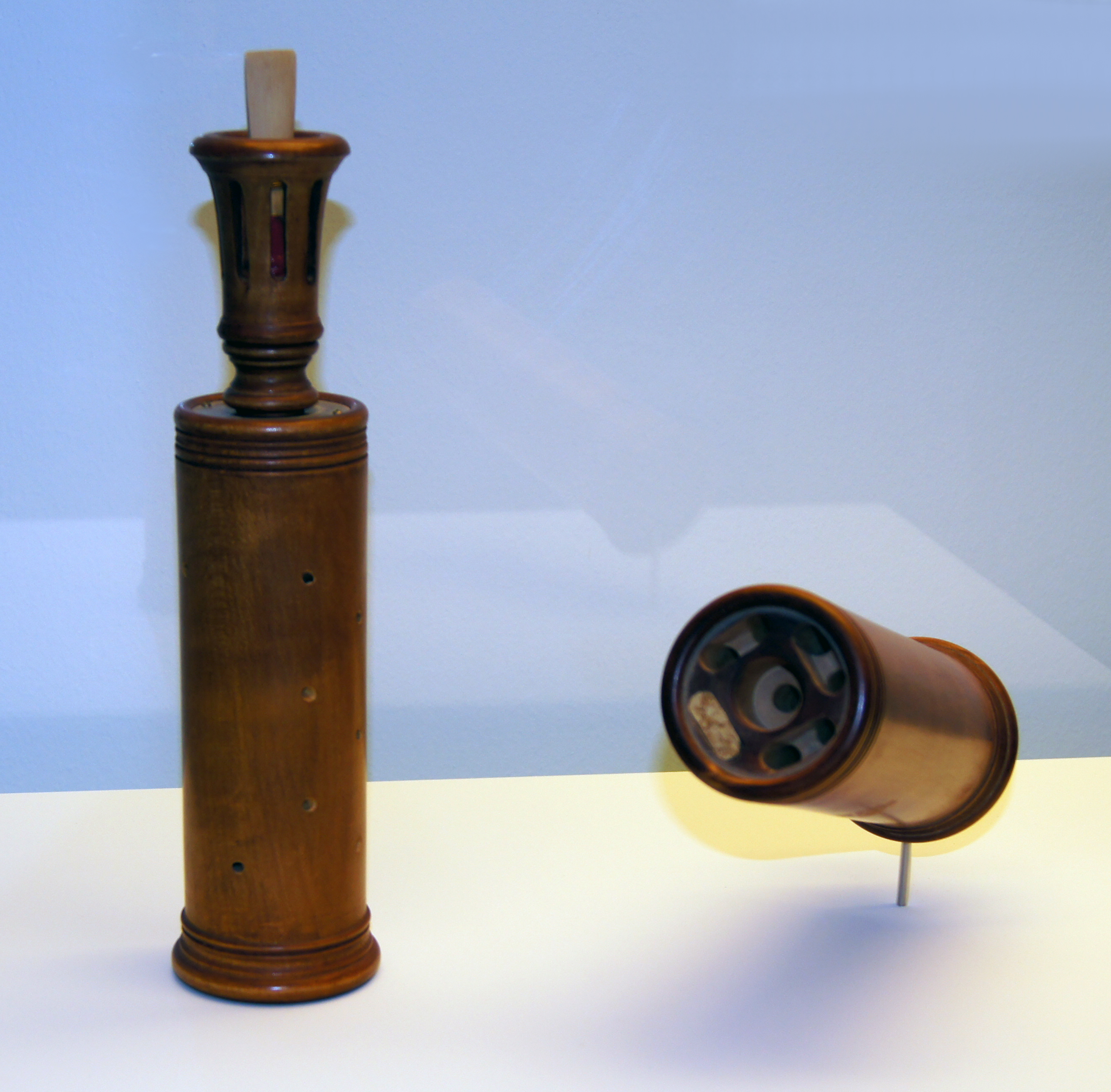

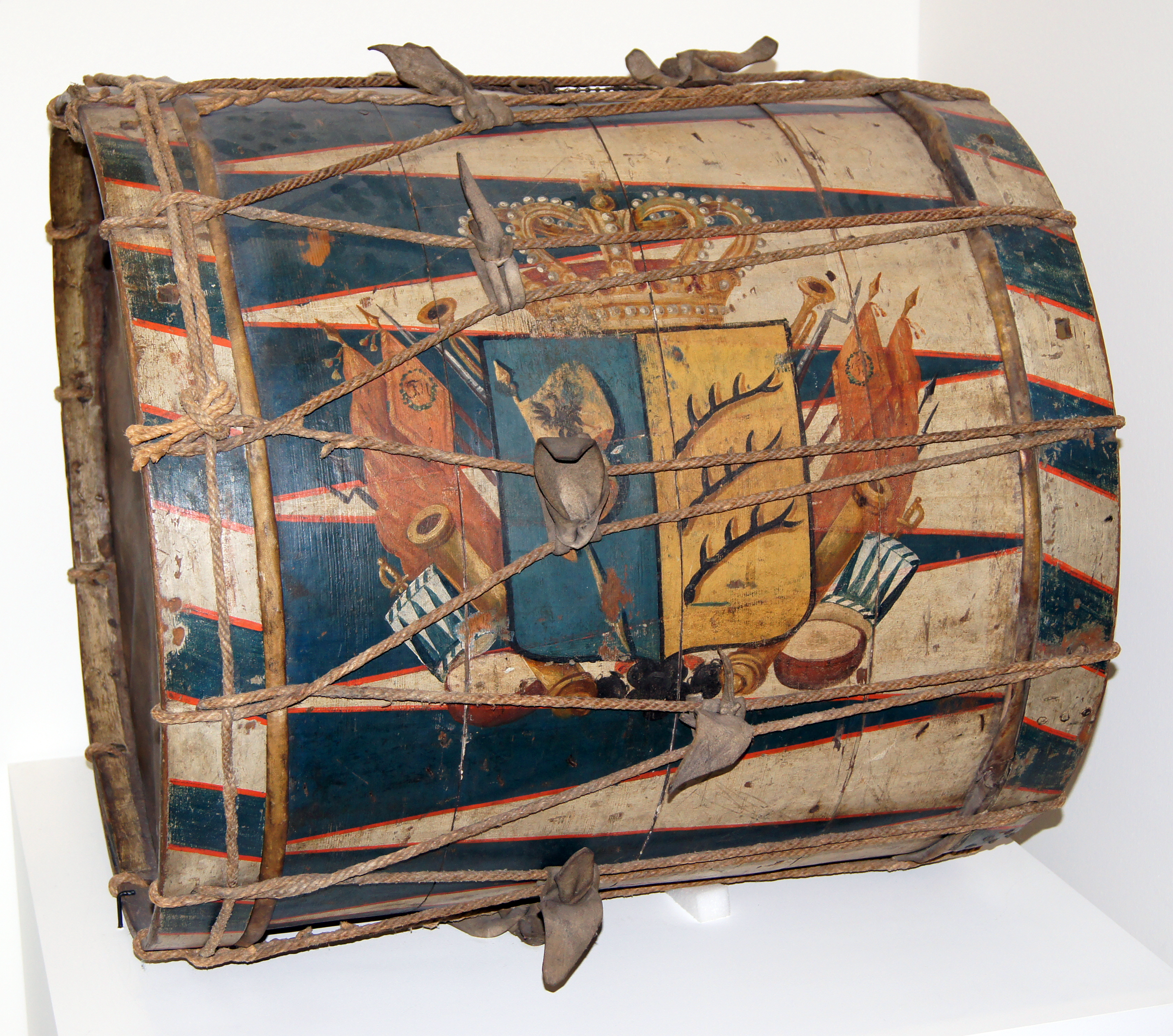

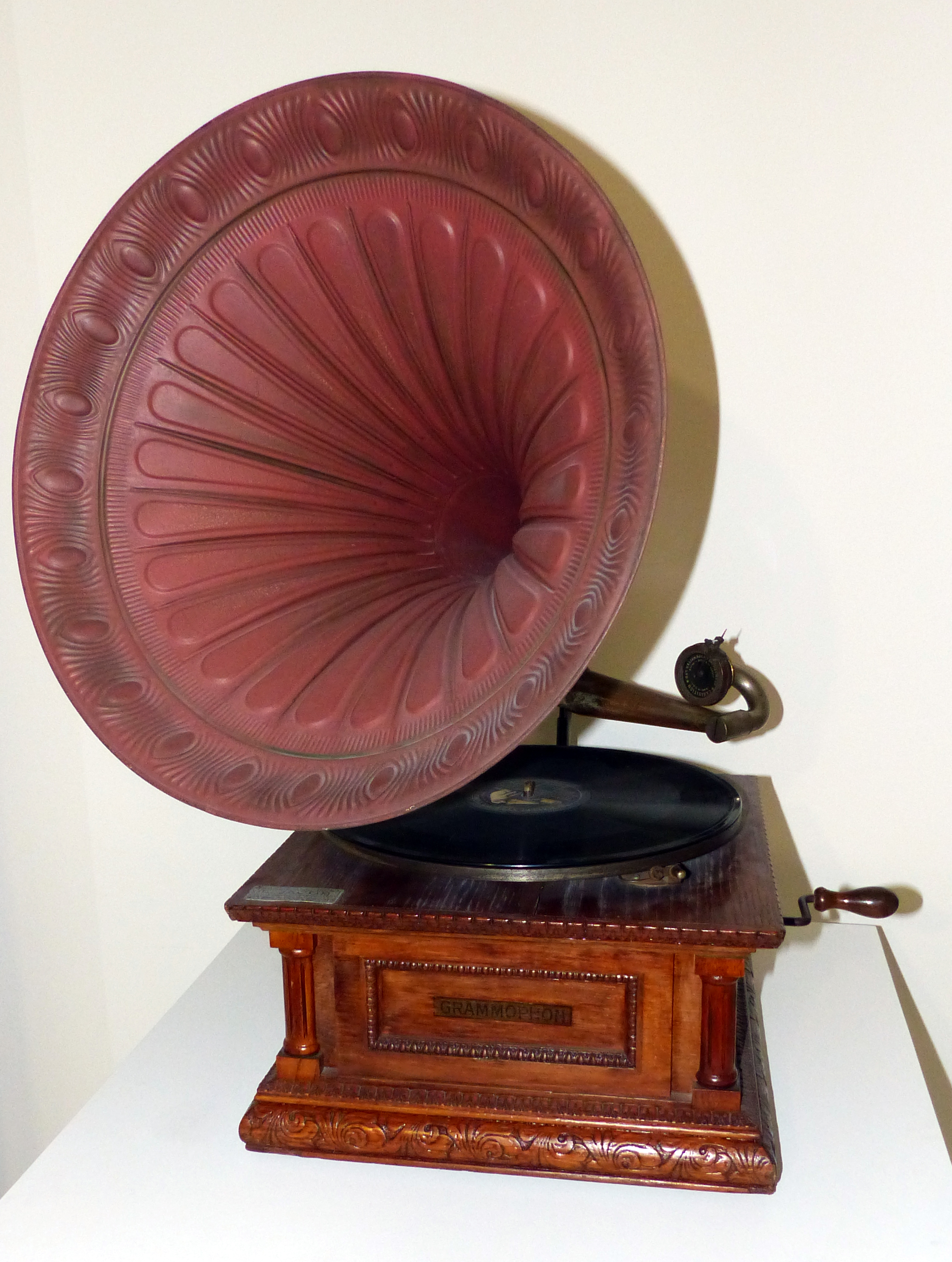

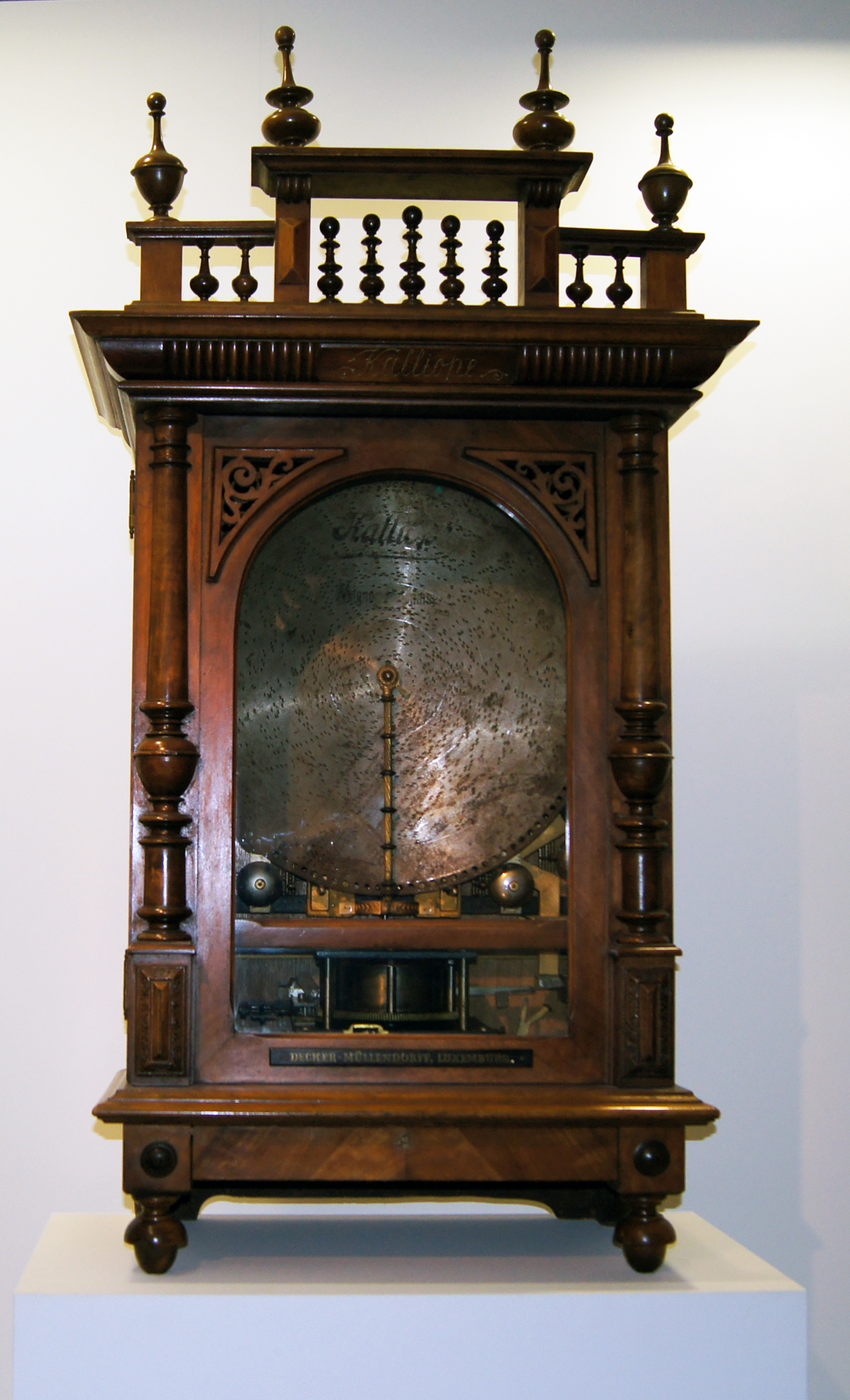

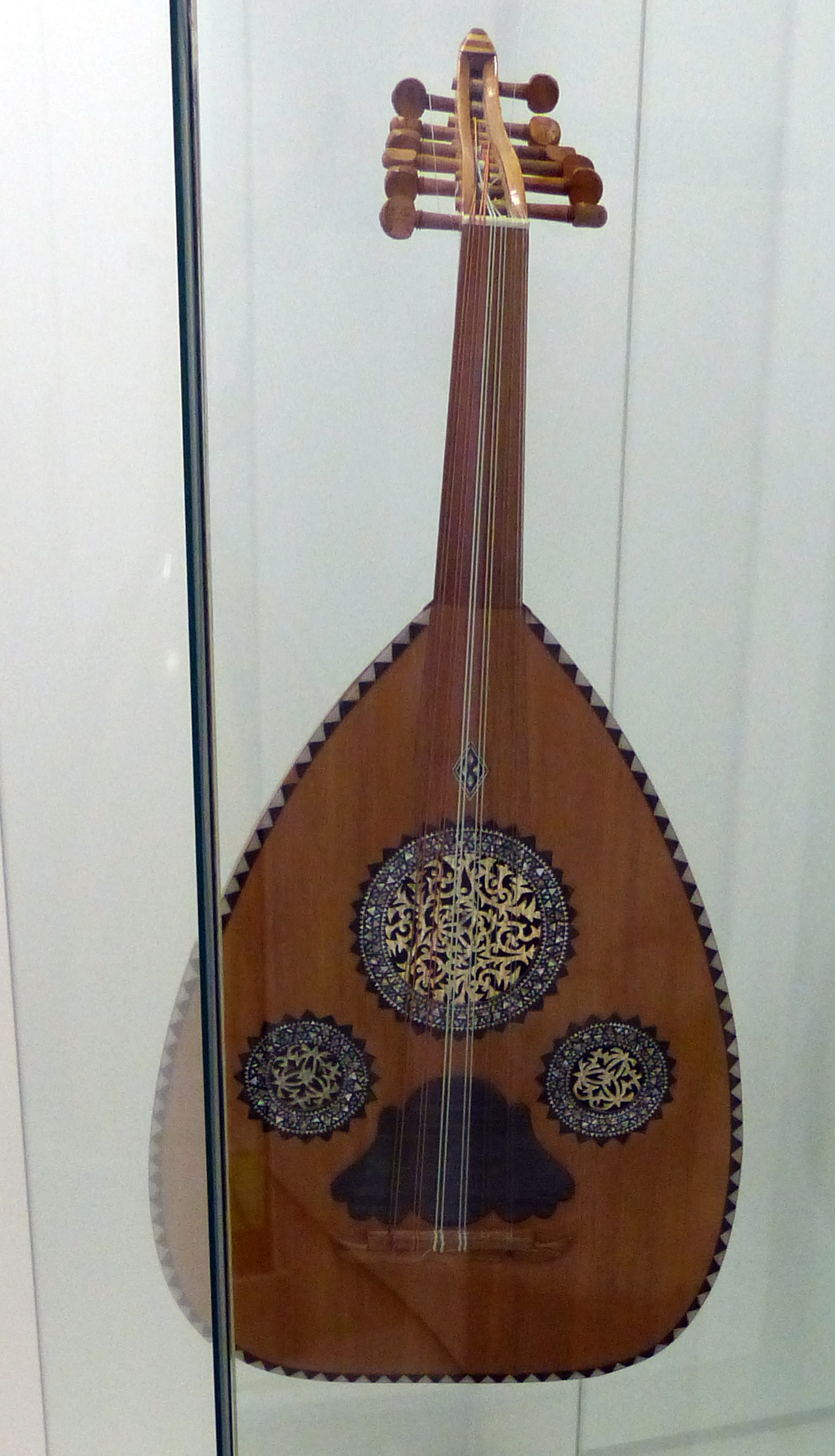
