= Gianfranco Blasi =

Italian politician, essayist, and poet (born 1958)

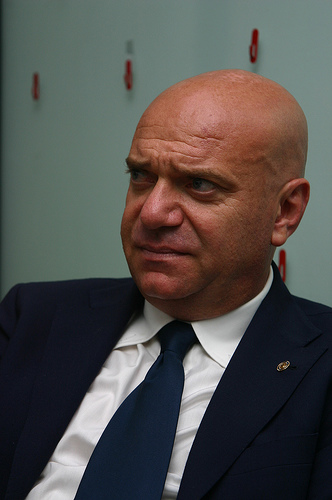

Member of the Chamber of Deputies
- In office 26 May 2001 – 27 April 2006
- Constituency: Basilicata

Personal details
- Born: 29 May 1958 (age 68) Potenza, Italy
- Party: Christian Democracy (until 1994); Forza Italia (1994–2008); Italy of the Centre (2008); Great South (2011–2013); Forza Italia (2013–2014); Brothers of Italy (2014–2018)
- Children: 3, including Gianmarco
- Occupation: Journalist; essayist; poet

Gianfranco Blasi (born 29 May 1958) is an Italian politician, essayist, and poet who was a member of the Chamber of Deputies from 2001 to 2006. A Salesian student, he was raised as a liberal Catholic and was a leader of Christian Democracy (DC), first in the party's youth wing and then at the city and provincial levels. In the 1990s, Blasi served as a regional councillor in Basilicata several times with Forza Italia (FI), the regional section of the party that he helped to co-found in 1994. He was a city councillor in Potenza and a member of Parliament with various roles as a deputy.

In 2003 and 2004, Blasi obtained national and international attention for his opposition to a nuclear waste site in Basilicata and for being wrongly charged in a local judicial investigation. In the late 2000s, he politically distanced himself from Silvio Berlusconi, citing judicial and cultural conflicts, feeling that one should defend oneself at trial and not from being put on trial. After leaving Forza Italia, Blasi was the co-founder of several minor Southern Italian parties like Italy of the Centre (IdC) and Great South (GS) between 2008 and 2013, when he returned to the new Forza Italia.

In 2014, Blasi joined Brothers of Italy (FdI) and was instrumental in the election of the first centre-right coalition candidate as mayor of Potenza. He continued to be active in centre-right politics until 2018 and subsequently mainly focused on his literary and poetry career, some of which were published in English. In addition to his career as journalist and various roles in several companies, he became a member of the Tiberian Academy.

== Early life and political career ==
Blasi was born on 29 May 1958 in Potenza, the capital of Basilicata, a small region in Southern Italy. He obtained a diploma from the city's commercial institute to become an accountant and programmer. During the mid-1970s, Blasi began his political career within Christian Democracy. He said that he got interested in politics since he was a teenager, first at school thanks to participatory models and then in the Catholic movement. Blasi joined the youth wing of Christian Democracy and became a party leader at the youth, city, and provincial levels.

Blasi was active within the student movement, the Salesian parish, and the party branch, an image that he likes to remember and is proud of. Around this time, he met Emilio Colombo, the only prime minister of Italy from Potenza. When Colombo (who was made senator for life in 2003) died in June 2013, he honoured him, stating that thanks individuals like Colombo, an "inestimable value will always live on in the civic consciousness of our country: a sense of state. The ability to serve institutions before oneself. This is and will remain the statesman Colombo." During his early political career, Blasi was an official of the Italian region of Basilicata and a member of the political secretariat of the presidency of the Regional Council of Basilicata's Budget Committee. From 1990 to 1994, he served as regional secretary of the trade union Italian Confederation of Trades Unions's (CISL) Public Function. As part of his formative training in politics, Blasi moved to Rome to study politics and attended the Training School in Taranto, and studied Business Organisation at the Higher School of Public Administration in Lucca.

== Forza Italia ==
In 1994, with the judicial revolution of Mani pulite and the resulting fall of the First Italian Republic, which he described as "a period also marked by the excessive presence of the judiciary, which became a sort of partisan arbiter of what later happened", Blasi was one of the founders, alongside other local Italian Socialist Party (PSI) members, of Berlusconi's Forza Italia. As a result, he is considered among the founders of the centre-right coalition in Basilicata. In discussing the impact of all this in Basilicata, Blasi recalled that the "acceleration toward the so-called change occurred too suddenly", arguing that "as always happens in times of transition, there was a repositioning of the ruling classes", citing as an example the fall of the fascist regime in Italy and how many "podestas then became mayors of their own towns the day after the fall of the Duce".

Blasi was part of Christian Democracy's thinkers who chose not to follow Mino Martinazzoli and Colombo's turn to the centre-left, recalling "the strong tensions both with my national and regional leaders of the CISL, and with my friends in the DC who chose the left-wing agreement". Blasi added that he and the co-founders of Forza Italia had "embraced the idea of a modern umbrella organisation like Forza Italia", which he described as a "secular home where liberals, Catholics, and reformist socialists could easily recognise each other". In 1995, Blasi was elected councillor of Basilicata, a position he held for two terms, also serving as vice president of the Regional Council of Basilicata and subsequently president of the Special Commission for the Reform of the Statute. In June 1999, Blasi was the centre-right coalition (Pole for Freedoms) candidate for mayor of Potenza. Although he was not elected as mayor as he finished third behind Gaetano Fierro of the Union of Democrats for Europe (UDEUR), which since February 1999 became part of The Olive Tree-led centre-left first D'Alema government, and the official centre-left coalition and Democrats of the Left (DS) candidate Prospero Bonito Oliva, he served as city councillor. Of Forza Italia as a party, he later said that it was disappointing, with some broken promises.

== Member of the Chamber of Deputies ==
In the 2001 Italian general election, Blasi was elected to the Chamber of Deputies in the 22nd multi-member district of the Basilicata constituency in the proportional representation quota as part of the House of Freedoms centre-right coalition's overall electoral win. He served in this position for a single-term until 2006. In this capacity, he served as co-rapporteur for the Budget and Finance Committees in 2002, along with Giorgio La Malfa, in the investigation into the introduction of the euro in Italy, and in 2003 was rapporteur for the 2004 state budget. Blasi was the first signer of several law proposals and was a co-signer of many others.

Blasi was among the founders of the Parliamentary Association on the Principle of Subsidiarity, which aims to introduce subsidiarity into the Constitution of Italy, national legislation, regional legislation, and central and territorial public statutes. In May 2003, he and other deputies across the political spectrum had a meeting to discuss and debate politics in order to reduce the polarisation of the early 2000s. From 2003 to 2006, Blasi served as Forza Italia's national representative for Southern Italy. In 2004, he took part to the annual edition of the Rimini Meeting. Blasi was also a member of several parliamentary bodies, including the Election Committee from 13 June 2001 to 27 April 2006, the 5th Commission (Budget, Treasury, and Planning) from 20 June 2001 to 27 April 2006, and the Parliamentary Consultative Commission for the Implementation of the Administrative Reform, Pursuant to Law No. 59 of 15 March 1997 from 9 October 2003 to 27 April 2006.

In late 2003, the second Berlusconi government wanted to activate the single nuclear waste site at Scanzano Jonico in the Metaponto area, citing support from the local mayor. Blasi launched what was described as a "dramatically heartfelt" appeal to Berlusconi for the immediate revocation of the decree. Among others, his opposition to the plan received national attention. On 13 November 2003, Italy's leading news agency ANSA quoted Blasi as saying: "Besides appearing inconsistent with the value of democratic participation, it seems like a cynical and arrogant prank played on a regional community, perhaps because it is small and considered easily attackable." In a speech to the Chamber of Deputies about the issue, Blasi expressed his "firm and clear no to the government's decision", stating that he was "firmly and adamantly opposed to Scanzano's choice". Blasi's views were shared by figures like Colombo and of the opposition, such as The Daisy (DL) deputy and Legambiente founder Ermete Realacci, the Federation of the Greens (FdV) secretary Alfonso Pecoraro Scanio, and Guido Tampieri, who was the Emilia-Romagna regional councillor for the environment. Ultimately, the protests were successful and the government's plans were scrapped.

== Iena 2 judicial investigation ==
In November 2004, Blasi and other local politicians across the political spectrum were involved in a judicial investigation (Iena 2), which saw the detention of some 50 individuals, as authorised by the Potenza judge of the preliminary investigation (GIP) Alberto Iannuzzi and as requested by the public prosecutors Vincenzo Montemurro and John Woodcock. Blasi denied any wrongdoing and the accusations after he was named among the suspects, and said: "The legal case in which my name is being linked to those under investigation, concerning relationships between members of the business, political, and criminal worlds of Basilicata, is paradoxical." He denounced the investigation as a "political persecution", and told ANSA: "It's unthinkable that the values of generosity and human helpfulness are turned into crimes." Similarly, Forza Italia's deputy coordinator Fabrizio Cicchitto said: "We have the impression that someone wants to reintroduce the justice system to political purposes. I know the Hon. Blasi and I am astonished by the crimes he is accused of. In the past, the Potenza Prosecutor's Office has accustomed us to fuss over the matter, which immediately received great media coverage and was subsequently foiled by the courts, given what happened in another region as well."

Prosecutors said they would ask the Italian Parliament to lift the parliamentary immunity of Blasi so that he could be arrested; however, the Chamber of Deputies unanimously rejected Blasi's arrest, citing "the irregularity of the wording of the charge against the MP Blasi" and the fact that "the Potenza Review Court has annulled most of the restrictive measures ordered by the GIP", including that of Blasi. The Basilicata regional coordination group of Forza Italia stated that this would allow Blasi to "resume, with due serenity, his commitment to the Lucanian community and the ideals and programmes of Forza Italia". According to Forza Italia, "misunderstandings and misinterpretations have led to the hypothesis of crimes to which MP Blasi, as evidenced by the report unanimously approved by both the Authorisations Committee and the Chamber of Deputies, is held completely innocent. Of this, we were fully convinced, knowing his personal history and his human, even more than political, qualities." Fellow party member Gaspare Giudice added that the unanimous vote of the Chamber of Deputies had demonstrated "the inconsistency of the accusations leveled against our friend Gianfranco Blasi" and expressed his hope that Blasi would "resume with renewed vigor his already strong political commitment to defending legality and transparency". Subsequently, first the Potenza Review Court and then Italy's Supreme Court of Cassation overturned the charges against him, and he was exonerated and his case was dismissed in 2006, as also requested by Woodcock. As a result, the website Errorigiudiziari.com considered the Blasi case a judicial error, which was placed within the context of a series of high-profile investigations by Woodcock that either resulted in the dismissal of all charges or in acquittals.

== Later political career ==
In 2008, along with Vincenzo Scotti and Antonio Milo, Blasi founded the political movement Italy of the Centre (IdC). In 2011, together with Gianfranco Miccichè, he co-founded the Great South (GS) party, of which he was national secretary for territorial organisation. In June 2011, he said there was a need of "fresh air, a political presence closer to the needs of the people and the local community" as the "stale atmosphere of old politics" remained in "the halls of power". He said that people were tired and were right to be so, stating that politics "must be able to listen and interpret change". He added that this was why "we've remained 'Forzisti' within; we won't give up our calling" and that Southern Italy was "our natural terrain for sharing and participating in a new era". He described this political proposal as "a pinch of positive madness and a revolutionary idea".

In April 2012, Blasi said that the "breakdown of the social pact and national cohesion" had caused "a serious and further setback in the economy of Southern Italy" as work, social, and productive structures, as well as planning and a vision for the future were "missing". He called for "awareness and an extraordinary effort from the people of Southern Italy" to "rediscover the reasons for hope and trust, which are now so rarefied in the fog of individualism and the retching of a modernity that is losing and confusing the old social structure and disintegrating the connective tissue of our relationships". In the 2012 Sicilian regional election, Miccichè placed fourth with 15 per cent of the vote and was not elected president of Sicily; however, the Great South party gained 5 seats at the Sicilian Regional Assembly. On 30 October 2012, two days after the election, he opened up to the centre-left coalition, which won the election, to help govern the region. He said that Great South was "by no means a centre-right party", adding that the political experience with the centre-right coalition had ended "almost two years ago". He described the Great South party as "a movement of ideas and values with precise historical and territorial references" and further said that the new Southern question also lied in "the capacity for democratic rebellion against mafias, clientelism, cultural legacies, strong powers, and old parties".

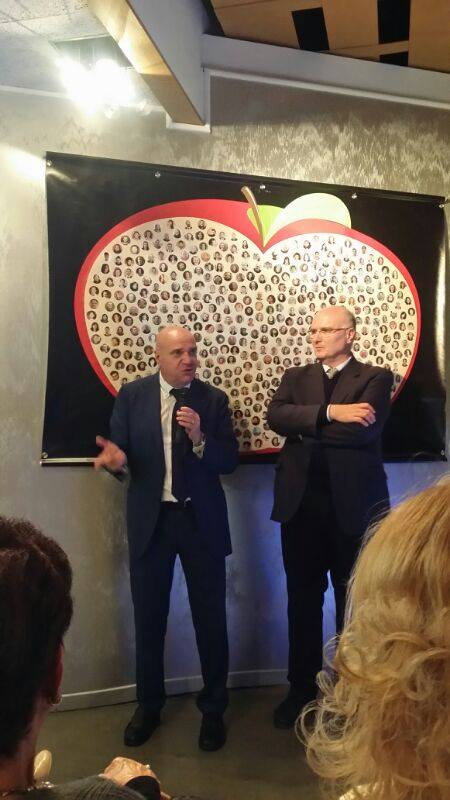
Blasi with Dario De Luca in May 2014

In the 2013 Italian general election, Blasi helped to organise the Great South party's electoral lists and unsuccessfully ran for the Senate of the Republic as the party leader in Basilicata. For the election, the Great South party had formed an electoral alliance with The People of Freedom (PdL), a political party that was the result of a merge in March 2009 (after being established as an electoral list in February 2008) between Forza Italia and National Alliance (AN), the new major centre-right alliance. Later in November 2013, he joined the new Forza Italia, the party into which Great South had merged. He also became the spokesperson for the Association of Former Regional Councillors and Parliamentarians of Basilicata.

For the 2014 Italian local elections, Blasi switched to Brothers of Italy, a political party founded in December 2012 as a split from The People of Freedom and as the legal successor of National Alliance; he was a member of the national leadership of Brothers of Italy from 2015 to 2018. In 2014, he was at the centre of a political turning point when Potenza held elections for the renewal of its municipal administration. A coalition that appeared to be a minority one was formed, as it did not have the support of Forza Italia and the New Centre-Right (NCD). Brothers of Italy, Populars for Italy (PpI), and several civic list movements supported Blasi and Gianni Rosa's (the regional leader of the right-wing Basilicata party) candidacy of Dario De Luca. Blasi and Rosa said that they presented an electoral list in every comune and that Brothers of Italy was "ready for the electoral challenge". In an upset, after reaching the runoff election against the centre-left coalition and Democratic Party (PD) candidate Luigi Petrone with a significant disadvantage (47.8% to 16.7%), meaning that he would lack a majority in the city council (a role known in local Italian politics as anatra zoppa, or "lame duck"), De Luca overturned the significant first-round deficit to become Potenza's first centre-right coalition mayor.

Blasi later described De Luca's victory as "a clear affirmation of the centre-right in Potenza", saying this was not only due to "the electoral alliance between sections of the Catholic world and right-wing cultural circles, movements, and parties", but also because of "the generational divide it created between old politics and new rights, between clientelism and freedom, between dependence and autonomy. Between desire and resistance to change." Due the mayor's lack of majority, he had to mediate with the other parties, in particularly the PD. In January 2016, in response to the national PD's claims, which he summarised as saying that "De Luca has nothing to do with the right, and therefore a single-party Renzi–Speranza coalition can be formed" due to the mayor's lack of majority in the City Council of Potenza, he argued that this confirmed "the arid pragmatism of a party capable of cultivating the future only through power". In his speech referencing the then prime minister Matteo Renzi, the local PD deputy Roberto Speranza, and the deputy PD secretary Lorenzo Guerini, Blasi concluded by stating "with all due respect to Guerini and a Democratic Party that no longer even has the colour of left-wing flags".

== Journalism, poetry, and other writings ==
A journalist and professor of Journalism, Communication, and Creative Writing in a Master's programme, Blasi collaborates with several national and local publications, and was the editor of several newspapers and magazines. During his journalism career, he founded two magazines: the weekly Il Balcone del Conte and the monthly CentoxCento Magazine, of which he began working as editor-in-chief. He also wrote several essays and books on economic and political affairs, and the social column "Pillole di Società". In 2006, the book Il partito lucano d'azione by Michele Strazza and Fabio Settembrino, which was published by Edizioni Sud'Altro with a preface by Blasi, received a special mention at the Basilicata Literary Prize. As a poet, Blasi draws inspiration from imagism, early 20th-century literary movement that originated in the United States and England and whose main exponents were Ezra Pound and James Joyce. His poetry is based more on the rhythm of words and their ability to evoke images than on rhyme. He was the winner of the 1999 Thalia Prize with ...e io plano, which was published by Erreci Edizioni in 1998, and is the author of a comparative study on the poetics of Pound (Per ogni visione: un canto, which was published by La Bottega della Stampa in 2001). As a writer, Blasi was described as a "creative, eclectic author, with a dry, fast-paced, at times spasmodic writing style in a continuous climax of emotions and perceptions".

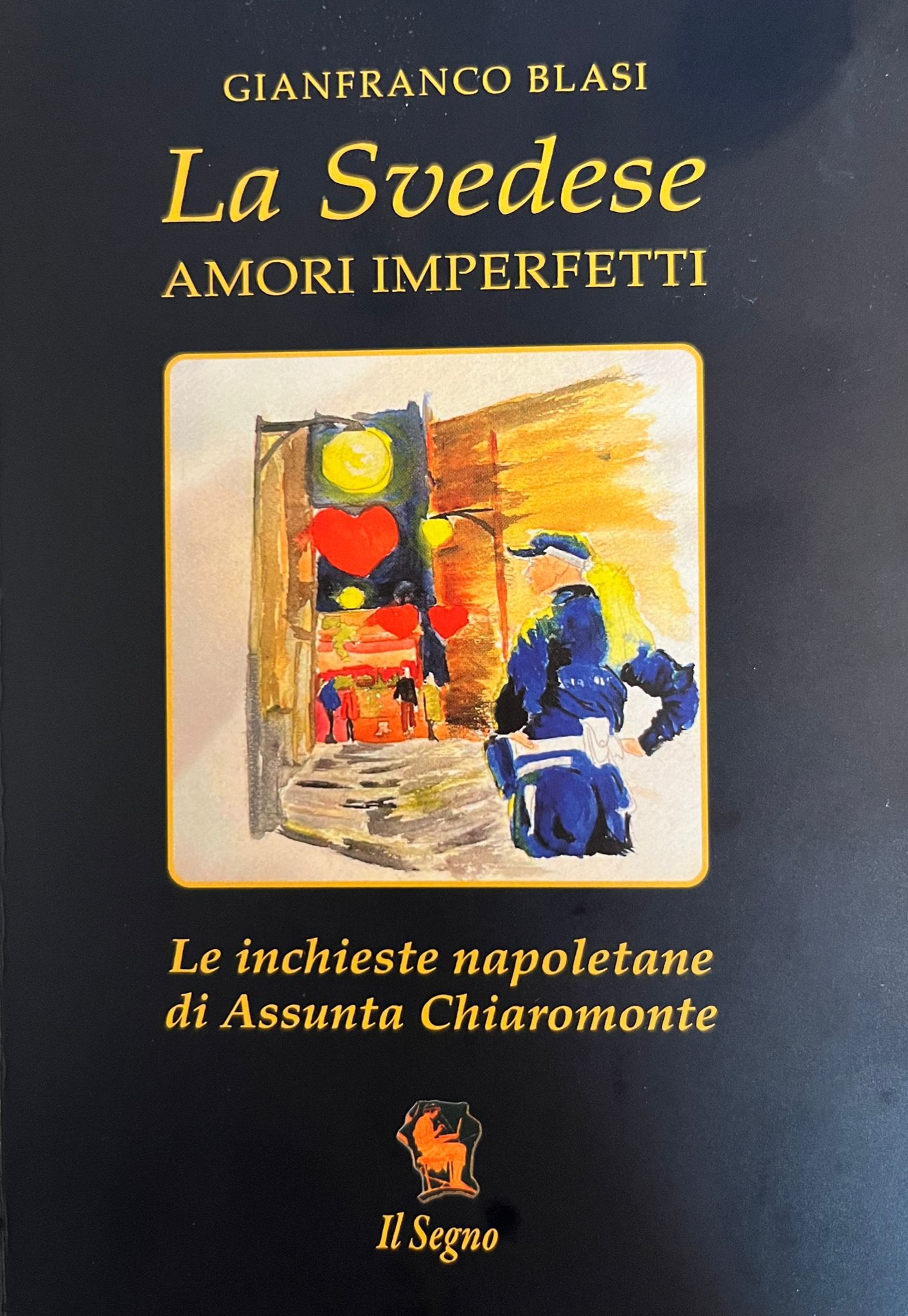
Cover of La svedese, Blasi's crime fiction novel

Blasi was born on 29 May, the day Potenza celebrates the Parade of the Turks, and he was one of the creators and promoters, alongside among others Rocco Cantore, of the institution of Sarachella (Sarachedda in the local dialect), Potenza's carnival mask. Since its first edition, it is held as an annual event, which is linked to the old town (centro storico). This initiative was born from a service of the Lions Club Host Potenza, of which Blasi is member. For this project, he created the nursery rhyme Sarachella, Re un giorno, povero tutto l'anno, which opened the illustrated album of the character. In 2012, he contributed to Sarachella e la maschera potentina. In 2014, he was also the author of the comic book Storia a fumetti di Sarachella, which was distributed in the primary schools of Potenza, and was among the organisers of the festival of the same name, which reached its third edition in 2015. Sarachella, a "crooked figure of body and ridiculous stature, bearer of disturbing truths that common sense and respectability distrust and reason discriminates against", was also brought to theatre.

In 2017, Blasi published La tua vera eredità, an essay on Christianity starting from his own experience of faith. In 2018, and then reprinted in 2019, the historical novel La croce diversa about Gerard of Potenza was published, becoming a critical and editorial success as it reached a third edition and a fourth reprint. It was described as "the first real novel about the history of the protector of Potenza". In 2018, Blasi and Nicola Pascale released Conversazioni pedagogiche about pedagogy and the Italian school-educational system. In 2021, his short stories about love themed around a song were collected in My Generation. All three volumes were published by Universo Sud, of which Blasi was editorial director. In 2024, he released the crime fiction novel La svedese, which is set in Naples with Assunta Chiaromonte (the Lieutenant of the Municipal Police of Piazza Municipio) as protagonist, and the psychology essay Dalla forma dell'emozione a quella della conoscenza. Both works were published by Il Segno.

Known for his qualities as a writer, poet, intellectual, cultural animator, and editor, Blasi edited numerous volumes by Lucanian poets, novelists, and essayists, served on local and national poetry juries, and is the organiser of Universo Culturale Lucano, a circle of poets and writers. Two of his four poetic works were translated into English. He also became a member of the historic cultural and academic institution, with a specific focus on Roman culture, history, and the Latin language, known as the Tiberian Academy. In 2025, Blasi and Aldo Noviello (a sociologist and psychology expert) wrote Dialoghi di Cicerone, with a preface by Pascale (the local president of the Tiberian Academy) and curated by professor of literature Gabriella Quaglia, which was published by Il Segno. The book attempts to actualise Cicero's views, and also includes an interview with the Hungarian jurist Gábor Hamza and argues for the relevance of Cicero as "one of the greatest thinkers of all time". The book, which had a presentation and theatrical dramatisation in March 2026, was positively reviewed and was described as one of Blasi's "most mature and ambitious works".

== Other roles ==
Blasi is a teacher of journalism and creative writing in advanced training programmes. During his career, he served as director of several public companies. In the early 1990s, Blasi was one of the founders of the Logos Polis Consortium, a European consortium of businesses, universities, and research centres. With the director of the Astronomy Centre in Capodimonte, Naples, and the mayor of Castelgrande, Basilicata, and with the scientific support of the National Institute for Astrophysics (INAF), he co-founded the Castelgrande Astronomical Observatory (FOAC), of which he was president from 2003 to 2005. He was credited for having been able to raise significant national funds for the financial support for the FOAC.

In 2006, Blasi began serving as scientific director of the Centre for Studies and Research on Southern Italy, which focuses on publishing and the history of Southern Italy, territorial planning, and development and research projects particularly related to technological innovation. In September 2013, he remembered the figure of John Bosco and said that Bosco's faith had been "the leaven of many cultures" and that Bosco "enlightened the world with his insights", empashising that Bosco was able to "transform the dust of poverty into wheat". From 2008 to 2012, Blasi was a member of the board of directors of the Lucanian Energy Company (SEL), an in-house company of Basilicata. There, he worked in communications and training and developed integrated projects for schools on energy efficiency and the development of clean energy sources, particularly photovoltaics. He served as vice-president and communications manager.

== Personal life and views ==
In addition to politics and poetry among his main interests, Blasi enjoys stuffed peppers and sports, such as cycling, boxing, basketball, and association football, and is a supporter of Inter Milan. A political moderate, he is a regionalist in the liberal and Christian-democratic (or popolare, from popolarismo) tradition, and he is a follower of Luigi Sturzo and Luigi Einaudi. He hosts a blog titled Pensieri meridiani.

Blasi described the constitutional reform that halved the Italian Parliament as a result of the 2020 Italian referendum as having "reduced the Italian Parliament to a sort of enlarged condominium, taking away vital space from representative democracy". During the escalation of the Russo-Ukrainian war with the 2022 Russian invasion of Ukraine, he supported Ukraine against Vladimir Putin and Russian imperialism. He called for a just peace (as "Ukrainians are dying under Russian bombs and missiles. And they are waging a courageous war to avoid annihilation") rather than a peace at all costs ("I don't like living room, respectable, and insincere peace. The peace that cultivates our selfishness, our comforts, and our flash mobs isn't courageous at all. It's just a way of escaping the reality and drama of the situation"), stating that core values like freedom, national sovereignty, and democracy are not values that he intends to trade for "a few cubic meters of gas". In the 2026 Italian constitutional referendum, Blasi supported the judicial reform by the Meloni government and justice minister Carlo Nordio on the grounds that it would lead to a "truly impartial judge, fewer miscarriages of justice, a judiciary free from factionalism, more accountable judges, and a more efficient justice system". In March 2026, he took part to a debate on the issue, which was moderated by Maurizio Bolognetti, a journalist and the local secretary of the Italian Radicals (RI). Blasi delivered the closing remarks, outlining to the audience what he called "the unresolved question".

Blasi is married to Annamaria Molinari, a school teacher; together, they have three children, and he is a grandfather. His son, Gianmarco (born 1989), is a lawyer and journalist who also began a political career, unsuccessfully running in the 2019 Basilicata regional election as a member of the League (Lega), and ran again in the 2024 Basilicata regional election. He was city councillor from 2019 to 2022 and assessor with responsibility for Budget, Heritage, Sports, and Planning since 2022; he resigned from this position in February 2025, when he was appointed by Vito Bardi, the first centre-right coalition president of Basilicata who was elected in 2019 and re-elected in 2024, as the delegate person by the Government Commissioner for hydrogeological instability.

== Works ==
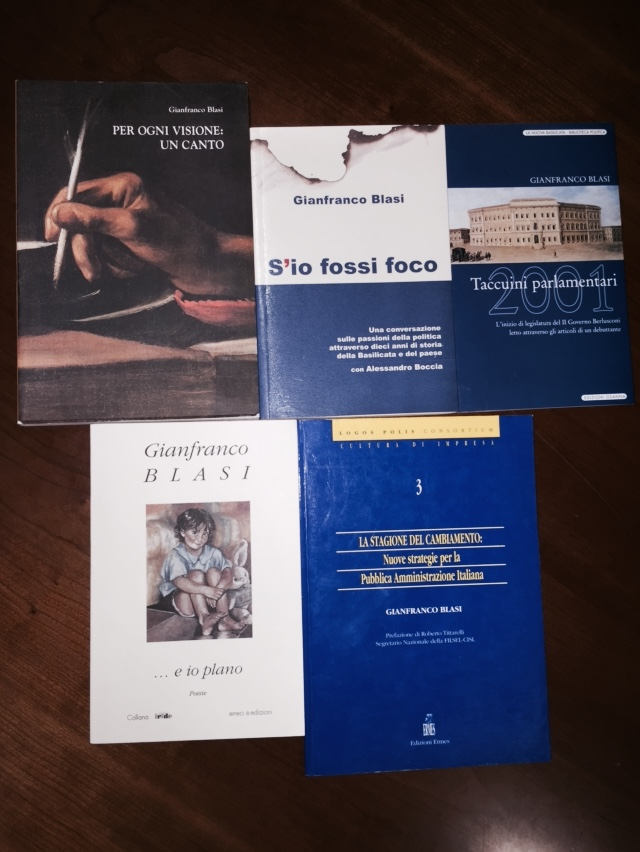
Books by Blasi

=== Selected articles ===
- Blasi, Gianfranco (16 June 2007). "L'eterno seme dell'amore" (PDF). Il Balcone del Conte (in Italian). Archived (PDF) from the original on 24 June 2021 – via Domos Basilicata.
- Blasi, Gianfranco; et al. (November 2010). "Quarant'anni" (PDF). Basilicata Regione Notizie (in Italian). No. 125/126. Regional Council of Basilicata. Archived (PDF) from the original on 1 April 2026.
- Blasi, Gianfranco (23 June 2022). "Pillole di guerra n. 25". Talenti Lucani – Passaggio a Sud (in Italian). Archived from the original on 3 July 2022.
- Blasi, Gianfranco (3 August 2022). "I mulini ad acqua a Satriano: l'ultimo saggio di Nicola Pascale". Talenti Lucani – Passaggio a Sud (in Italian). Archived from the original on 3 August 2022.
- Blasi, Gianfranco (2 December 2022). "Potenza, Small capital dell'Appennino meridionale". CulturaIdentità (in Italian). Archived from the original on 16 June 2025.
- Blasi, Gianfranco (4 February 2023). "Autonomia, decentramento, nuova organizzazione della repubblica". Talenti Lucani – Passaggio a Sud (in Italian). Archived from the original on 4 February 2023.
- Blasi, Gianfranco (8 February 2023). "L'affermazione di Sarachella e della sua amica Rusnella, due maschere, un'idea vincente per Potenza". Talenti Lucani – Passaggio a Sud (in Italian). Archived from the original on 8 February 2023.

=== Books ===
- Blasi, Gianfranco (1993). La stagione del cambiamento (in Italian). Potenza: Edizioni Ermes.
- Blasi, Gianfranco (1993). Approccio al problema della dinamica organizzativa e della comunicazione in azienda (in Italian). Potenza: Edizioni Ermes.
- Blasi, Gianfranco (1993). Dal sistema impresa ai network organizzativi (in Italian). Potenza: Edizioni Ermes.
- Blasi, Gianfranco (1998). ...e io plano (in Italian). Anzi: Erreci Edizioni.
- Blasi, Gianfranco (2001). Per ogni visione: un canto (in Italian). Potenza: La Bottega della Stampa.
- Blasi, Gianfranco (2003). Taccuini parlamentari 2001 (in Italian). Venosa: Osanna Edizioni.
- Blasi, Gianfranco (2005). S'io fossi foco (in Italian). Anzi: Erreci Edizioni.
- Blasi, Gianfranco (2006). "Prefazione". Il partito lucano d'azione: 1924-1925 (in Italian). Potenza: Edizioni Sud'altro. Archived from the original on 1 April 2026 – via Google Books. Settembrino, Fabio; Strazza, Michele (authors).
- Blasi, Gianfranco (2014). Storia a fumetti di Sarachella (in Italian). Potenza: Edizioni Sud'altro.
- Blasi, Gianfranco (2017). La tua vera eredità. Paolo di Tarso e altre storie—Trasgressioni amorose (in Italian). Potenza: Universosud Edizioni.
- Blasi, Gianfranco (2018). La croce diversa (in Italian). Potenza: Universosud Edizioni. Avigliano, Rosario Angelo (curator).
- Blasi, Gianfranco; Pascale, Nicola (2018). Conversazioni pedagogiche. Su valori, saperi, prassi della scuola italiana nell'Italia repubblicana (in Italian). Potenza: Universosud Edizioni.
- Blasi, Gianfranco (2024). La svedese. Amori imperfetti. Le inchieste napoletane di Assunta Chiaromonte (in Italian). Potenza: Edizioni Segno.
- Blasi, Gianfranco (2024). Dalla forma dell'emozione a quella della conoscenza. Un contributo alla comprensione dell'educazione sentimentale (in Italian). Potenza: Edizioni Segno.
- Blasi, Gianfranco; et al. (2025). Jazz Club (in Italian). Potenza: Edizioni Hermaion.
- Blasi, Gianfranco; Noviello, Aldo (2025). Dialoghi con Cicerone. Oltre i confini della storia (in Italian). Potenza: Edizioni Segno. Quaglia, Gabriella (curator).

== Bibliography ==
=== Articles ===
- "'Adriano, i segreti di Roma': bellezza e potere in scena a Potenza. Sogni, danza e memoria nel racconto teatrale di Kevin Arduini, che si confida: 'un viaggio tra anima e mito, tra desiderio e impero' (Gianfranco Blasi)". Faro di Roma (in Italian). 14 July 2025.
- Amendolara, Fabio (31 July 2010). "Nucleare in Basilicata «Il sindaco Altieri disse sì al sito unico»". La Gazzetta del Mezzogiorno (in Italian). Archived from the original on 1 April 2026.
- "Amministrative, Rosa e Blasi: liste presenti in ogni Comune". Regione Basilicata (in Italian). 12 March 2014.
- "A Potenza i 'Dialoghi con Cicerone' di Gianfranco Blasi e Aldo Noviello". Basilicata Digital Channel (in Italian). 12 March 2026. Archived from the original on 1 April 2026.
- "Blasi e Guma in campo per il centrodestra". Le Cronache Lucane (in Italian). 14 May 2019. Archived from the original on 26 April 2025.
- "Blasi (FdI-An): De Luca sindaco eletto dal centrodestra". Regione Basilicata (in Italian). 19 January 2016.
- "Blasi (Grande Sud): Grazie Napolitano, Presidente meridionale, statista meridionalista". Il Metapontino (in Italian). 19 March 2013.
- "Blasi (Grande Sud): occorre recuperare identità e prospettive". Regione Basilicata (in Italian). 16 April 2012.
- "Blasi (Sud'Altro) ricorda la figura di Don Bosco". Regione Basilicata (in Italian). 26 September 2013.
- "Blasi: 'Una vicenda paradossale'". TGcom24 (in Italian). 22 November 2004. Archived from the original on 31 March 2026.
- "'Book in rock': a Potenza le presentazioni di 'Basilicata #luogoideale' e di 'My generation'". Il Mattino di Basilicata (in Italian). 3 August 2020.
- Brancati, Massimo (13 June 2025). "Dissesto idrogeologico, messa in sicurezza". AGR Basilicata (in Italian).
- Brienza, Rosita Stella (31 December 2020). "'Basilicata. La storia, la politica, il suo popolo'. Intervista a Gianfranco Blasi". GianniPittella.com (in Italian). Archived from the original on 31 March 2026.
- "Carnevale (Grande Sud): rispettiamo Micciché; no a Forza Italia". Regione Basilicata (in Italian). 27 November 2013.
- "Comune Potenza, Blasi (Fdi-An) su ricorso Tar consiglieri Pd". Regione Basilicata (in Italian). 10 July 2015.
- "Comune Pz: Presentata l'edizione 2019 del Carnevale potentino". Regione Basilicata (in Italian). 13 February 2019.
- "Comune Pz: Sarachella maschera potentina, iter avviato". Regione Basilicata (in Italian). 14 February 2018.
- "Comune Pz: Sarachella è la maschera potentina". Regione Basilicata (in Italian). 13 June 2018.
- Cortese, Virginia (12 December 2018). "Presentate a Potenza, le Conversazioni pedagogiche di Nicola Pascale e Gianfranco Blasi". Contro Senso Basilicata (in Italian).
- De Stradis, Walter (7 February 2026). "Nardella (Lega) «Potenza, una città bloccata tra 'coperta corta' e decisioni a 'senso unico'»". Contro Senso Basilicata (in Italian).
- "Dialoghi con Cicerone, oltre i confini della storia". Regione Basilicata (in Italian). 12 March 2026.
- "Ecco 'Dialoghi con Cicerone' il nuovo libro di Blasi e Noviello". Le Cronache Lucane (in Italian). 21 July 2025. Archived from the original on 21 July 2025.
- "Elezioni: ecco le liste in Puglia e Basilicata I candidati in Puglia I candidati in Basilicata". La Gazzetta del Mezzogiorno (in Italian). 21 January 2013.
- "Elezioni, Grande Sud: intesa con Pdl e definizione liste". Regione Basilicata (in Italian). 9 January 2013.
- "È Sarachella la maschera della Città di Potenza". Contro Senso Basilicata (in Italian). 14 June 2018.
- "«Fanelli non risponde... e Blasi?»". Le Cronache Lucane (in Italian). 24 May 2024.
- Ferraris, Sergio (10 November 2014). "Nucleare: Scanzano e le scorie tese". Energia&Reti (in Italian). Archived from the original on 1 April 2026 – via SergioFerraris.it.
- "Gianfranco Blasi: 'Bardi al bivio del cambiamento'". Le Cronache Lucane (in Italian). 8 July 2019. Archived from the original on 31 March 2026.
- "Gianfranco Blasi è coordinatore regionale di Forza del Sud". Regione Basilicata (in Italian). 15 June 2011. Archived from the original on 31 March 2026.
- "Gianfranco Blasi riporta in vita il vescovo eroe per un viaggio avvincente tra mito e realtà". Il Mattino di Basilicata (in Italian). 23 April 2018.
- Gilberti, Alessandro (April 2014). "Dossier errori giudiziari. Professione Woodcock" (PDF). Tabloid Speciale Cultura (in Italian). No. 11. p. 38. Archived (PDF) from the original on 1 April 2026.
- "Grande successo per la presentazione del libro 'La Svedese – Amori Imperfetti' di Gianfranco Blasi presso la Sala Cultura della BCC Monte Pruno" (in Italian). Banca Monte Pruno. 6 December 2024.
- Hooper, John (23 November 2004). "International news in brief: Italian MPs face mafia allegation". The Guardian. Archived from the original on 31 March 2026.
- "Italian judge orders Mafia sweep". BBC News. 22 November 2004. Archived from the original on 31 March 2026.
- "Jazz Club". Libreria Ermes (in Italian). 2025.
- "La Camera: no all'arresto di Blasi". La Gazzetta del Mezzogiorno. 17 December 2004. Archived from the original on 17 January 2021.
- Laguardia, Giovanna. "Il cuore al centro: con Sarachella per far rivivere il borgo antico". Basilicata Digital Channel.
- Lancia, Alberto (19 July 2025). "Cicerone ci parla ancora: il sorprendente viaggio filosofico di Blasi e Noviello". CulturaIdentità (in Italian). Archived from the original on 5 August 2025.
- Lanza, Oreste Roberto (13 March 2026). "'Dialoghi di Cicerone oltre i confini della storia' a Potenza il libro di Blasi e Noviello". LSD Magazine (in Italian). Archived from the original on 31 March 2026.
- "La Società Energetica Lucana (SEL) presenta all'API il Piano Strategico". SassiLand (in Italian). 20 February 2026.
- "'La Svedese – Amori Imperfetti', il nuovo libro dell'On. Blasi. La presentazione presso la Sala Cultura della Bcc Monte Pruno". 105TV (in Italian). 29 November 2024.
- "'Le ragioni del Sì e del No a confronto', incontro a Lagonegro". SassiLive (in Italian). 15 March 2026.
- "Letteratura, la presentazione de 'La croce diversa' di Gianfranco Blasi a Potenza". Il Mattino di Basilicata (in Italian). 8 May 2018.
- "Mafia, maxioperazione nel Potentino". TGcom24 (in Italian). 22 November 2004.
- Martino, Anna (15 June 2018). "Potenza, Sarachella è la maschera della città". La Repubblica (in Italian).
- "Massimo in cinque minuti con Gianmarco Blasi". Basilicata Digital Channel (in Italian). 26 May 2024.
- Molinari, Gianni (22 October 2013). "Le scorie di Scanzano". Il bond, il brut & il cattivik (in Italian). Archived from the original on 1 April 2026.
- "Morte Colombo: il ricordo di Gianfranco Blasi". Regione Basilicata (in Italian). 25 June 2013.
- "'My Generation' a Maratea la presentazione del libro di Gianfranco Blasi". Giornalemio.it (in Italian). 2 September 2020.
- "My Generation il libro di Gianfranco Blasi" (in Italian). MarateaWebRadio.
- "Nero su Bianco – Dialoghi con Cicerone". Regione Basilicata (in Italian). 24 March 2026. Archived from the original on 31 March 2026.
- "Oltre i confini della storia: Cicerone come non lo avete mai ascoltato". Museo Potenza (in Italian). 7 March 2026. Archived from the original on 31 March 2026.
- Pagano, Stella (10 May 2018). "'La croce diversa' nuovo romanzo di Gianfranco Blasi presentato al Teatro Stabile di Potenza". Cronaca e Legalità (in Italian).
- Pisani, Leonardo (29 March 2022). "La IX edizione del Premio Internazionale di Poesia Universum – Città di Potenza". Talenti Lucani – Passaggio a Sud (in Italian).
- "Politicians, businessmen held in Mafia swoop". Reuters. 23 November 2004. Archived from the original on 31 March 2026.
- "Potenza: Blasi ha dovuto dimettersi dalla carica di consigliere comunale. Ecco chi subentra al suo posto". Potenza News (in Italian). 3 February 2025.
- "Presentazione libro 'La svedese (amori imperfetti)' di Gianfranco Blasi – Cecam di Marconia di Pisticci". SassiLive (in Italian). 3 April 2025.
- "Presentazione libro 'Dialoghi con Cicerone' di Gianfranco Blasi e Aldo Noviello a Potenza". SassiLive (in Italian). 11 March 2026.
- "Primi passi per la Società energetica lucana spa". La Gazzetta del Mezzogiorno (in Italian). 28 May 2008.
- "Prosegue campagna educativa della Società Energetica Lucana". Regione Basilicata (in Italian). 16 December 2010.
- "Provincia PZ: visita all'impianto fotovoltaico del museo". Regione Basilicata (in Italian). 15 April 2010.
- "Radice nuovo presidente Associazione ex consiglieri regionali". Regione Basilicata (in Italian). 11 July 2023.
- "Rischio idraulico, intervento a Scanzano Jonico". AGR Basilicata (in Italian). 29 July 2025.
- Rizzo, Francesco (15 March 2026). "A Potenza presentato I dialoghi con Cicerone". Le Cronache Lucane (in Italian).
- Rubino, Antonio (28 December 2024). "La Napoli di Gianfranco Blasi nel suo ultimo libro 'La Svedese – Amori Imperfetti'". Ivl24.it (in Italian).
- "Sant'Arsenio: il 5 dicembre la presentazione del libro dell'On. Gianfranco Blasi presso la sala cultura della Banca Monte Pruno". Vallo Più (in Italian). 2 December 2024.
- Santoro, Mario (23 July 2025). "Ripensando a '...e io plano' di Gianfranco Blasi". Talenti Lucani – Passaggio a Sud (in Italian).
- "Sarachella a teatro" (in Italian). 1 March 2019.
- "'Sarachella – La maschera potentina: riferimento e appartenenza', incontro a Potenza". SassiLive (in Italian). 20 February 2026.
- "Se il centrosinistra chiama, Grande Sud risponderà". Basilicata24 (in Italian). 30 October 2012.
- "Speciale Trentennale" (PDF). Basilicata Regione Notizie (in Italian). 2025.
- Sole, Claudio (20 March 2026). "Referendum, le ragioni del 'Si' e del 'No' a confronto. Dibattito organizzato da 'Lagonegro Riparte'". Basilicata Notizie (in Italian).
- Stefanelli, Manuela (20 July 2020). "My Generation, il nuovo libro di Gianfranco Blasi" (in Italian). Universosud Edizioni.
- Tassinari, Ugo Maria (23 November 2019). "Il cascione. 23 novembre 2003: il corteo dei 100mila ferma il deposito nucleare a Scanzano". L'alter-Ugo (in Italian).

=== Books ===
- Cantore, Rocco (2012). Sarachella. La maschera potentina (in Italian). Potenza: Novaria Edizioni. ISBN 978-88-904870-3-3. Archived from the original on 1 April 2026 – via Google Books.
- Capaccioli, Massimo; Longo, Giuseppe; Cirella, Emilia Olostro (2009). L'astronomia a Napoli dal Settecento ai giorni nostri. Storia di un'altra occasione perduta (in Italian). Naples: Guida Editori. ISBN 978-88-6042-827-1. Archived from the original on 1 April 2026 – via Google Books.
- Lupi, Maurizio (2011). La prima politica è vivere (in Italian). Milan: Edizioni Mondadori. ISBN 978-88-520-2135-0. Archived from the original on 1 April 2026 – via Google Books.
- Montemurro, Rossella (2004). I giorni di Scanzano. Cronaca di un accidente nucleare (PDF) (in Italian). Matera: Energheia. Archived (PDF) from the original on 22 January 2026.
- Tufano, Lucio (2013). Il Kanapone. Cronache di Grottescòpoli (in Italian). Rionero: Calice. ISBN 978-88-8458-134-1. Archived from the original on 1 April 2026 – via Google Books.

=== Documents ===
- "Disegni di legge. Atto Camera n. 2641. XIV Legislatura. Concessione di un contributo alla Fondazione Laboratorio Mediterraneo". Senato.it (in Italian). 23 April 2002. Archived from the original on 28 April 2026.
- "Disegni di legge. Atto Camera n. 2641. XIV Legislatura. Riforma dell' ordinamento minorile e del processo civile minorile". Senato.it (in Italian). 5 November 2003. Archived from the original on 1 April 2026.
- "Resoconto stenografico della Seduta n. 392 del 20/11/2003. Decisione del Governo di ubicare il deposito nazionale delle scorie nucleari in Basilicata – nn. 2-00983, 2-00985 e 2-00986". Documenti Parlamentari (in Italian). 20 November 2003. Archived from the original on 2 April 2026.
- "Resoconto stenografico dell'Assemblea. Seduta n. 562 del 17/12/2004. Discussione di una domanda di autorizzazione a eseguire la misura cautelare della custodia in carcere nei confronti del deputato Blasi". Documenti Parlamentari (in Italian). 17 December 2004. Archived from the original on 31 March 2026.

=== Profiles ===
- "Blasi Gianfranco". Camera dei deputati – Portale storico. 2015. Archived from the original on 15 July 2025.
- "Blasi Gianfranco". La Camera dei Deputati – XIV Legislatura (in Italian). 2023. Archived from the original on 24 November 2023.

=== Videos ===
- 2003, Scanzano Jonico deposito di scorie nucleari (video) (in Italian). Regional Council of Basilicata. 8 June 2021. Archived from the original on 1 April 2026 – via YouTube.
- A Potenza presentato I dialoghi di Cicerone. Gli autori Gianfranco Blasi e Aldo Noviello raccontano la loro opera. Le Cronache Lucane (video) (in Italian). 15 March 2025. Archived from the original on 1 April 2026 – via Cronache Social on Facebook.
- Bilancio del 'Festival Sarachella' la maschera potentina (video) (in Italian). Trmh24. 27 February 2014. Archived from the original on 4 April 2026 – via YouTube.
- Caleidoscopio – 'Dialoghi con Cicerone – Oltre i confini della storia' (video) (in Italian). Regione Basilicata. 12 March 2026. Archived from the original on 18 March 2026 – via YouTube.
- Il cuore al centro: con Sarachella per far rivivere il borgo antico (video) (in Italian). Basilicata Digital Channel. 14 February 2026. Archived from the original on 18 April 2026 – via YouTube.
- Incontri parole e cruschi: intervista a Gianmarco Blasi (video) (in Italian). Basilicata Digital Channel. 18 April 2024. Archived from the original on 18 April 2026 – via YouTube.
