= Guarente =

Guarente is an Italian surname. Notable people with the surname include:

- Leonard P. Guarente (born 1952), American biologist
- Mario Guarente (born 1983), Italian politician
- Tiberio Guarente (born 1985), Italian footballer
