= Scanzano Jonico =

Town in Basilicata, Italy

- Comune
- Comune di Scanzano Jonico
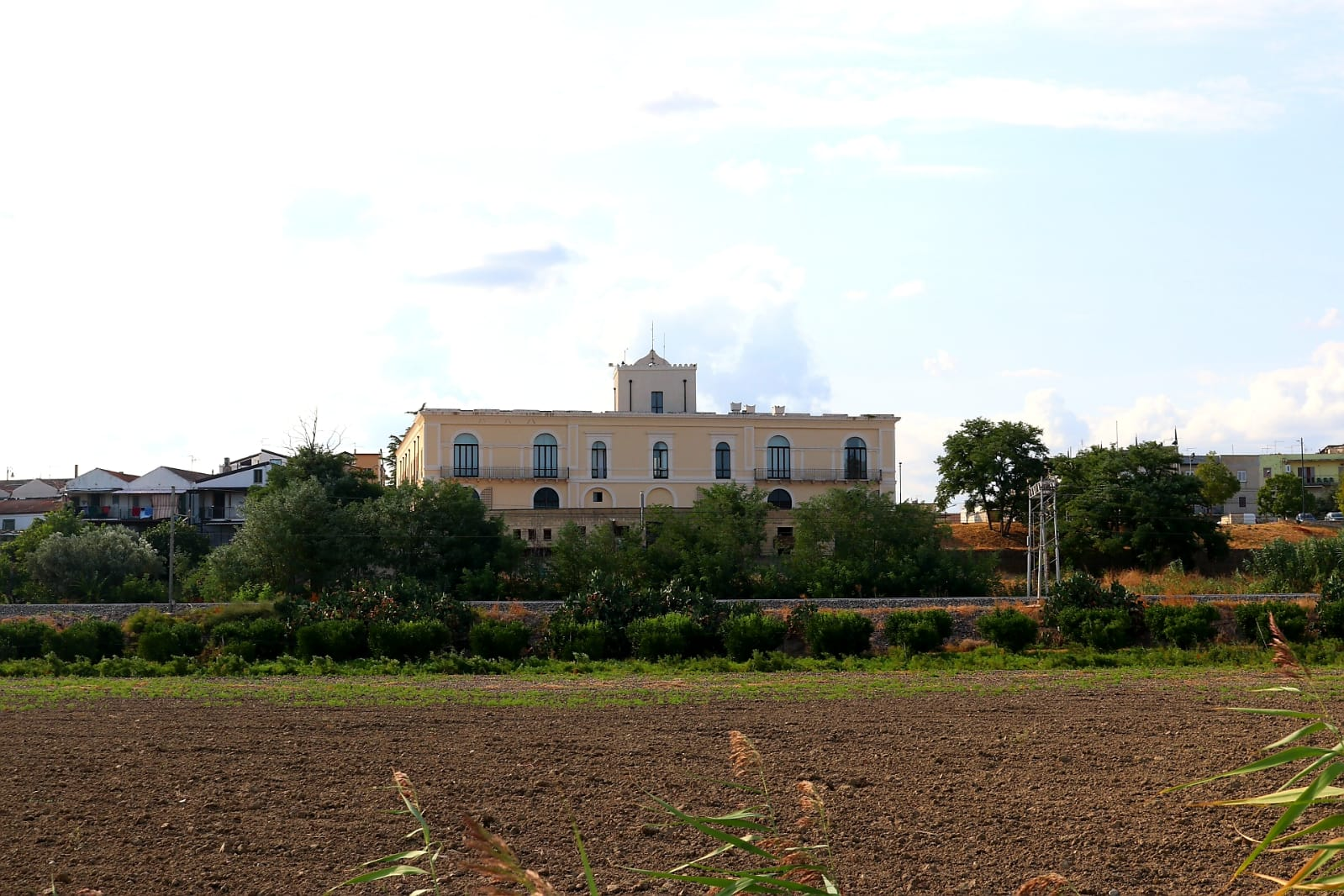
- View of Scanzano Jonico

- Location within Italy Location within Basilicata
- Coordinates: 40°15′N 16°42′E
- Country: Italy
- Region: Basilicata
- Province: Matera (MT)

Government
  - Mayor: Raffaello Ripoli

Area
  - Total: 72.18 km^{2} (27.87 sq mi)
- Elevation: 21 m (69 ft)

Population (May 2009) (Note: All demographics and other statistics are from the Italian statistical institute (National Institute of Statistics).)
  - Total: 7,146
  - Density: 99.00/km^{2} (256.4/sq mi)
- Demonym: Scanzanesi
- Time zone: UTC+1 (CET)
  - Summer (DST): UTC+2 (CEST)
- Postal code: 75020
- Dialing code: 0835
- ISTAT code: 077031
- Patron saint: Our Lady of the Annunciation
- Saint day: 25 March
- Website: Official website

Scanzano Jonico is a town and comune in the province of Matera, in the Southern Italian region of Basilicata.

== History ==
Scanzano Ionico is located in the province of Matera and had an area of 71.5 km^{2}, with a population of 7,050 in 2008. The town is located on the Ionian coast. Until 1974, it was part of the municipality of Montalbano Ionico under the name Scanzano.

=== 2003 protests ===
In late 2003, the second Berlusconi government wanted to activate the single nuclear waste site at Scanzano Jonico in the Metaponto area, citing support from the local mayor. This attracted criticism even within the centre-right coalition majority government. Gianfranco Blasi, the then deputy of Forza Italia, launched what was described as a "dramatically heartfelt" appeal to Berlusconi for the immediate revocation of the decree. Among others, his opposition to the plan received national attention. On 13 November 2003, Italy's leading news agency ANSA quoted Blasi as saying: "Besides appearing inconsistent with the value of democratic participation, it seems like a cynical and arrogant prank played on a regional community, perhaps because it is small and considered easily attackable."

In a speech to the Chamber of Deputies about the issue, Blasi expressed his "firm and clear no to the government's decision", stating that he was "firmly and adamantly opposed to Scanzano's choice". Blasi's views were shared by figures the opposition centre-left coalition, such as Ermete Realacci, a deputy from The Daisy and founder of Legambiente, senator for life Emilio Colombo, the Federation of the Greens (FdV) secretary Alfonso Pecoraro Scanio, and Guido Tampieri, the Emilia-Romagna regional councilor for the environment. Ultimately, the protests were successful and the government's plans were scrapped.

== Bibliography ==
=== General ===
- "Scanzano ionico". Treccani (in Italian). 2013. Archived from the original on 11 February 2013.

=== 2003 protests ===
- 2003, Scanzano Jonico deposito di scorie nucleari (video) (in Italian). Regional Council of Basilicata. 8 June 2021. Archived from the original on 1 April 2026 – via YouTube.
- Amendolara, Fabio (31 July 2010). "Nucleare in Basilicata «Il sindaco Altieri disse sì al sito unico»". La Gazzetta del Mezzogiorno (in Italian). Archived from the original on 1 April 2026.
- Ferraris, Sergio (10 November 2014). "Nucleare: Scanzano e le scorie tese". Energia&Reti (in Italian). Archived from the original on 1 April 2026 – via SergioFerraris.it.
- Molinari, Gianni (22 October 2013). "Le scorie di Scanzano". Il bond, il brut & il cattivik (in Italian). Archived from the original on 1 April 2026.
- Montemurro, Rossella (2004). I giorni di Scanzano. Cronaca di un accidente nucleare (PDF) (in Italian). Matera: Energheia. Archived (PDF) from the original on 22 January 2026.
- "Resoconto stenografico della Seduta n. 392 del 20/11/2003. Decisione del Governo di ubicare il deposito nazionale delle scorie nucleari in Basilicata – nn. 2-00983, 2-00985 e 2-00986". Documenti Parlamentari (in Italian). 20 November 2003. Archived from the original on 1 April 2026.
- Tassinari, Ugo Maria (23 November 2019). "Il cascione. 23 novembre 2003: il corteo dei 100mila ferma il deposito nucleare a Scanzano". L'alter-Ugo (in Italian). Archived from the original on 5 December 2025.
