= Nicola Valluzzi =

Italian politician (born 1969)

Mayor of Castelmezzano
- Incumbent
- Assumed office 26 May 2014
- In office 14 June 1999 – 8 June 2009

President of the Province of Potenza
- In office 13 October 2014 – 1 November 2018
- Preceded by: Piero Lacorazza
- Succeeded by: Rocco Guarino

Personal details
- Born: Nicola Rocco Valluzzi; 25 February 1969 (age 57) Castelmezzano, Province of Potenza, Italy
- Party: Democratic Party

Nicola Rocco Valluzzi (born 25 February 1969) is an Italian politician serving as mayor of Castelmezzano since 2014. He previously served as vice president of the Province of Potenza (2009–2014), and president of the Province of Potenza (2014–2018).
