= Potenza Cathedral =

Church in Potenza, Italy

Coordinates: 40.6403°N 15.8064°E

The Cathedral of San Gerardo is the main church or duomo of the city of Potenza, capital of the province of the same name, and of the region of Basilicata, Italy. Since 1986 Potenza forms part of the archdiocese of "Potenza-Muro Lucano-Marsico Nuovo".

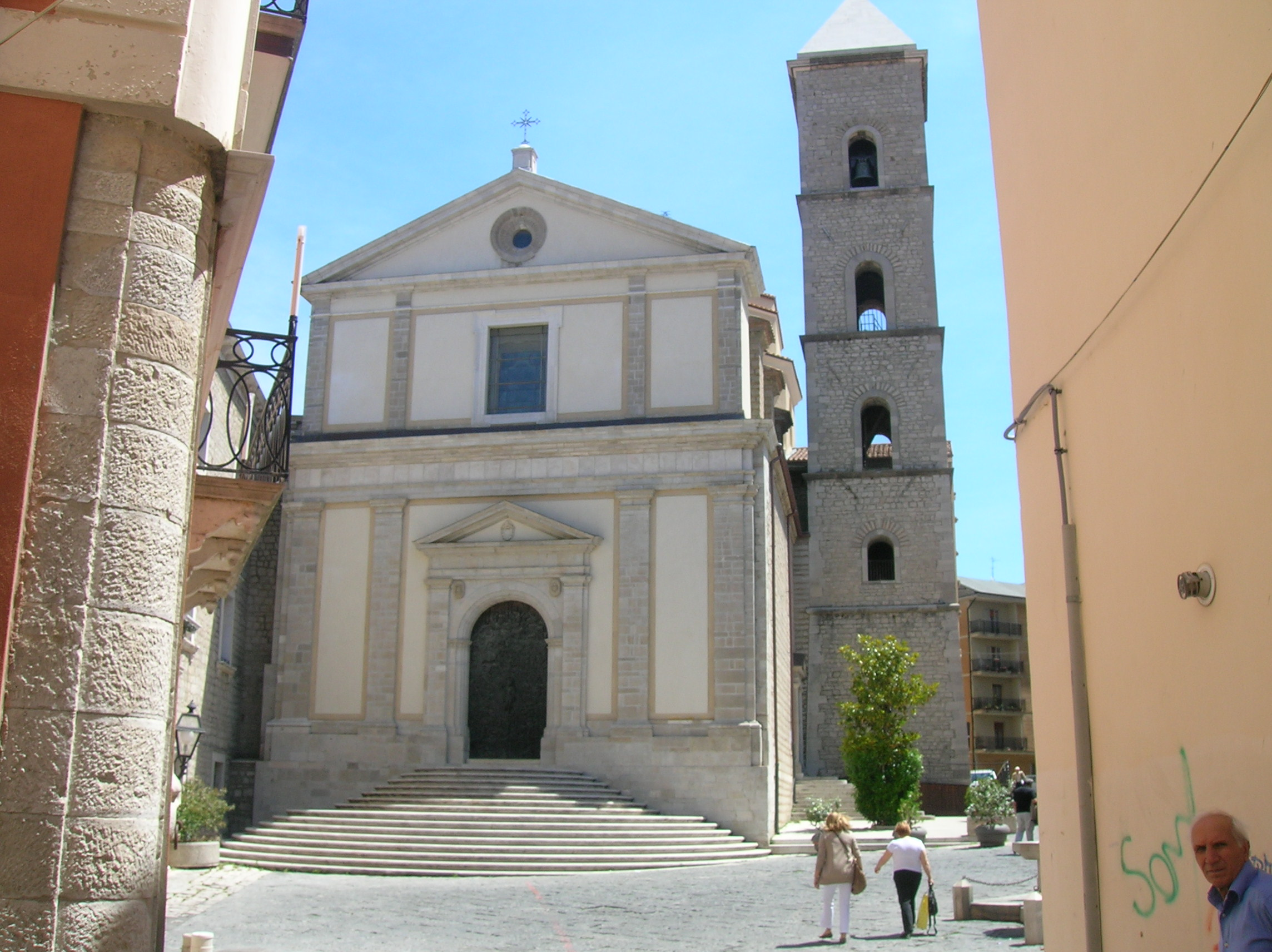
Facade of Cathedral

== History ==
A temple at the site, dedicated to the Virgin of the Assumption, likely dated to the 5th or 6th century, when it was supposedly founded by Saint Orontius of Lecce. A new church dedicated to St Gerardo della Porta, who became patron of the town and whose relics are sheltered here, was built between the 12th and 13th centuries, under the patronage of the bishop Bartolomeo (1197-1206). The five-story stone belltower from this church, attributed to designs by Sàrolo di Muro Lucano, still exists.

The present church is mainly due to a reconstruction during 1783 to 1799 in neoclassical-style with a design by Antonio Magri, a pupil of Luigi Vanvitelli. Since the church has required repairs after various earthquakes and a bombardment in 1943.

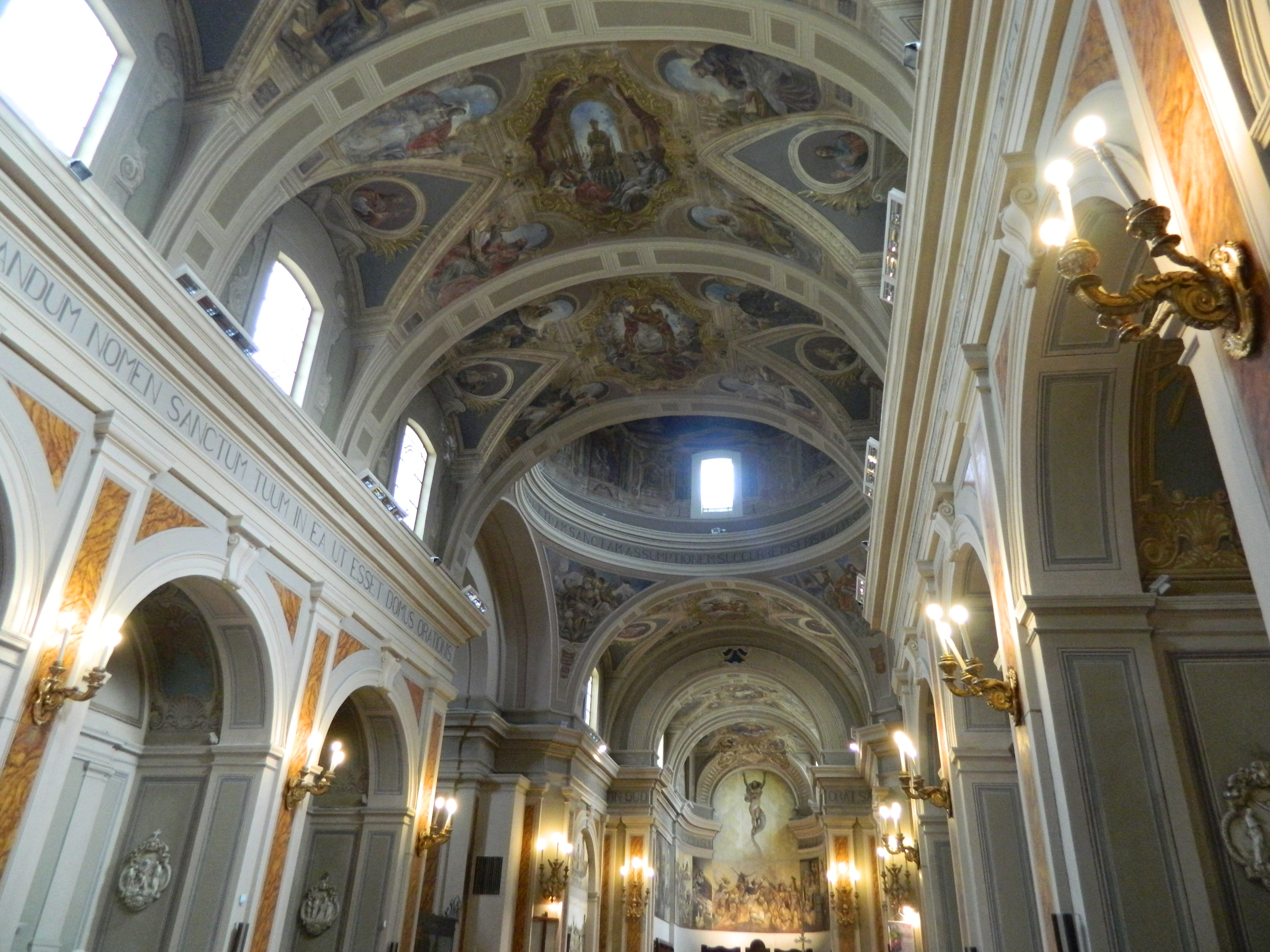
Nave ceiling frescoes

The ceilings and the apse have an elaborate program of frescoes painted in the 20th century. The ceiling was painted (1933-1934) from the façade to the presbytery with scenes from the old to new testament by the painter Mario Prayer. The bronze doors (1968) were created by Giuseppe Niglia. Below the main altar is a crypt with archeologic evidence of prior structures in a mosaic pavement. The dome has frescoes depicting a procession of St Gerard. The apse has a Christ the Redeemer frescoed against a bright background. The chapel of St Gerard has a 15th-century reliquary statue.
