= Rocco Guarino =

Italian politician (born 1969)

President of the Province of Potenza
- In office 1 November 2018 – 13 June 2022
- Preceded by: Nicola Valluzzi
- Succeeded by: Christian Giordano

Mayor of Albano di Lucania
- In office 7 May 2012 – 13 June 2022

Personal details
- Born: 8 November 1969 (age 56) Albano di Lucania, Province of Potenza, Italy
- Party: Democratic Party

Rocco Guarino (born 8 November 1969) is an Italian politician who served as president of the Province of Potenza from 2018 to 2022.

Guarino was elected to the municipal council of Albano di Lucania in 2002 on a civic list and also served as an assessor until 2012. He was elected mayor in May 2012 and re-elected in 2017. In January 2017, he was elected to the Provincial Council of Potenza with the Democratic Party and served as vice president of the province. In October 2018, he was elected president of the Province of Potenza.

In June 2022, Guarino sought a third term as mayor of Albano di Lucania, but was defeated by Bruno Santamaria of the civic list Liberamente per Albano. He also resigned from his office as president of the province and temporarily transferred his duties to vice president Rocco Pappalardo.
