= Gerard of Potenza =

Medieval bishop and saint

Saint Gerard of Potenza
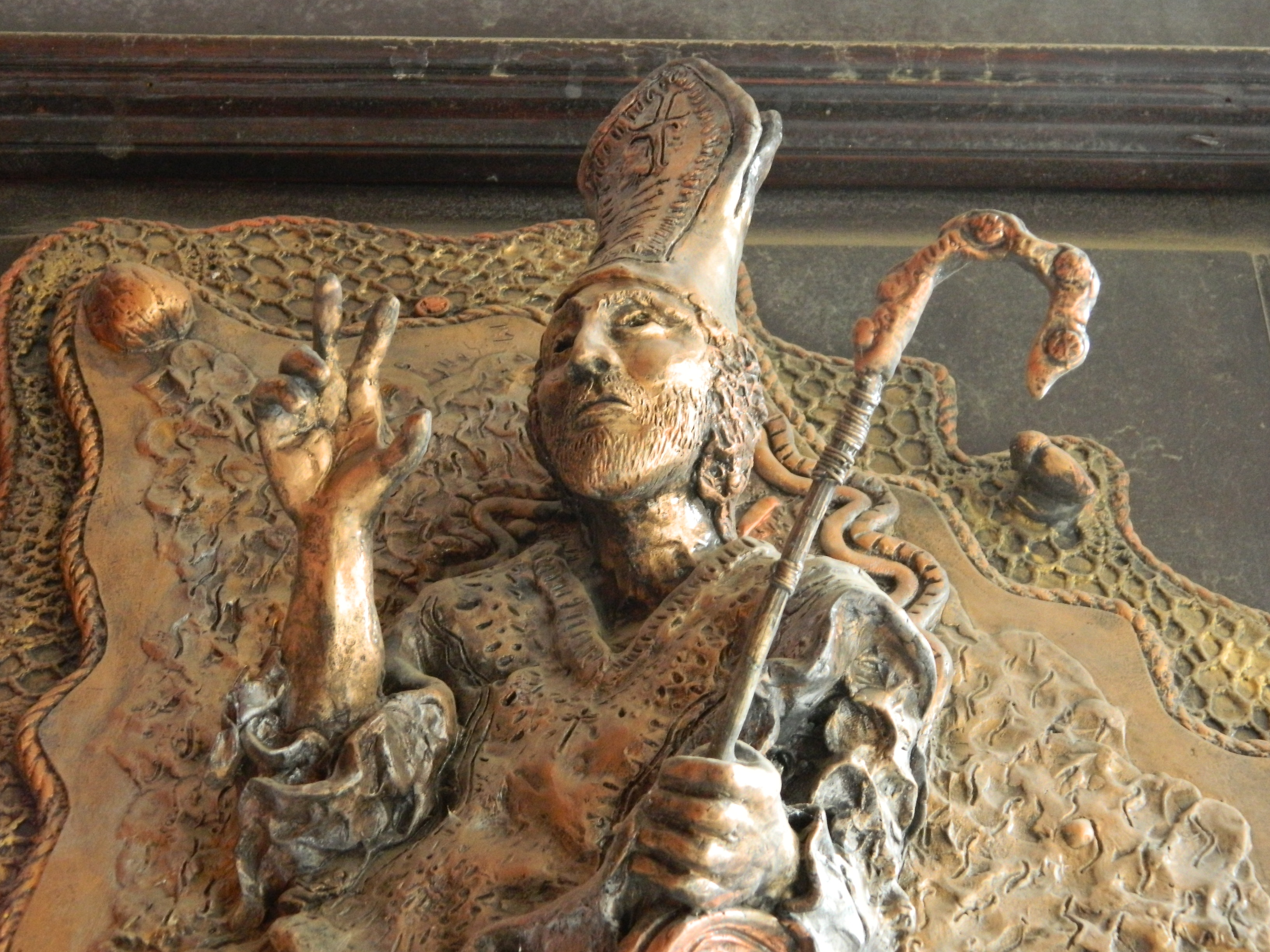
- Born: Piacenza, Holy Roman Empire
- Died: 30 October 1119; Potenza, Duchy of Apulia and Calabria
- Honored in: Catholicism
- Feast: 30 May, 30 October

Gerard of Potenza (Italian: Gerardo di Potenza), also known as Gerard La Porta (Gerardo La Porta), was a bishop of Potenza, the modern-day provincial capital of the Italian region of Basilicata in Southern Italy. In Potenza, he served as bishop for eight years until his death in 1119. After his death, Gerard was recognised saint by the Catholic Church. On 29 May, as part of the local myth and folklore, he is annually honoured with the Parade of the Turks (parata dei turchi).

== Early life ==
Gerard was born at an unknown date in Piacenza (a city of modern-day Emilia-Romagna that at the time was part of the Kingdom of Italy, a constituent kingdom of the Holy Roman Empire) into the noble Della Porta family. He traveled into modern-day Southern Italy in search of holy sites, and when he reached Potenza, in the historical region of Lucania, which was part of the Duchy of Apulia and Calabria, he decided to dedicate himself to the apostolic life. Such was his drive that when the local bishop (also named Gerard) died in 1909, the people and clergy chose Gerard as his successor.

== Bishop of Potenza and death ==
Gerard was proclaimed bishop at Acerenza in 1111 and was in the post for eight years. As part of a local myth, Gerard is particularly remembered for repelling the invasion of the Turks, who had arrived by navigating the Basento river, with a blinding light. Gerard died in Potenza on 30 October 1119.

== Cult and veneration ==
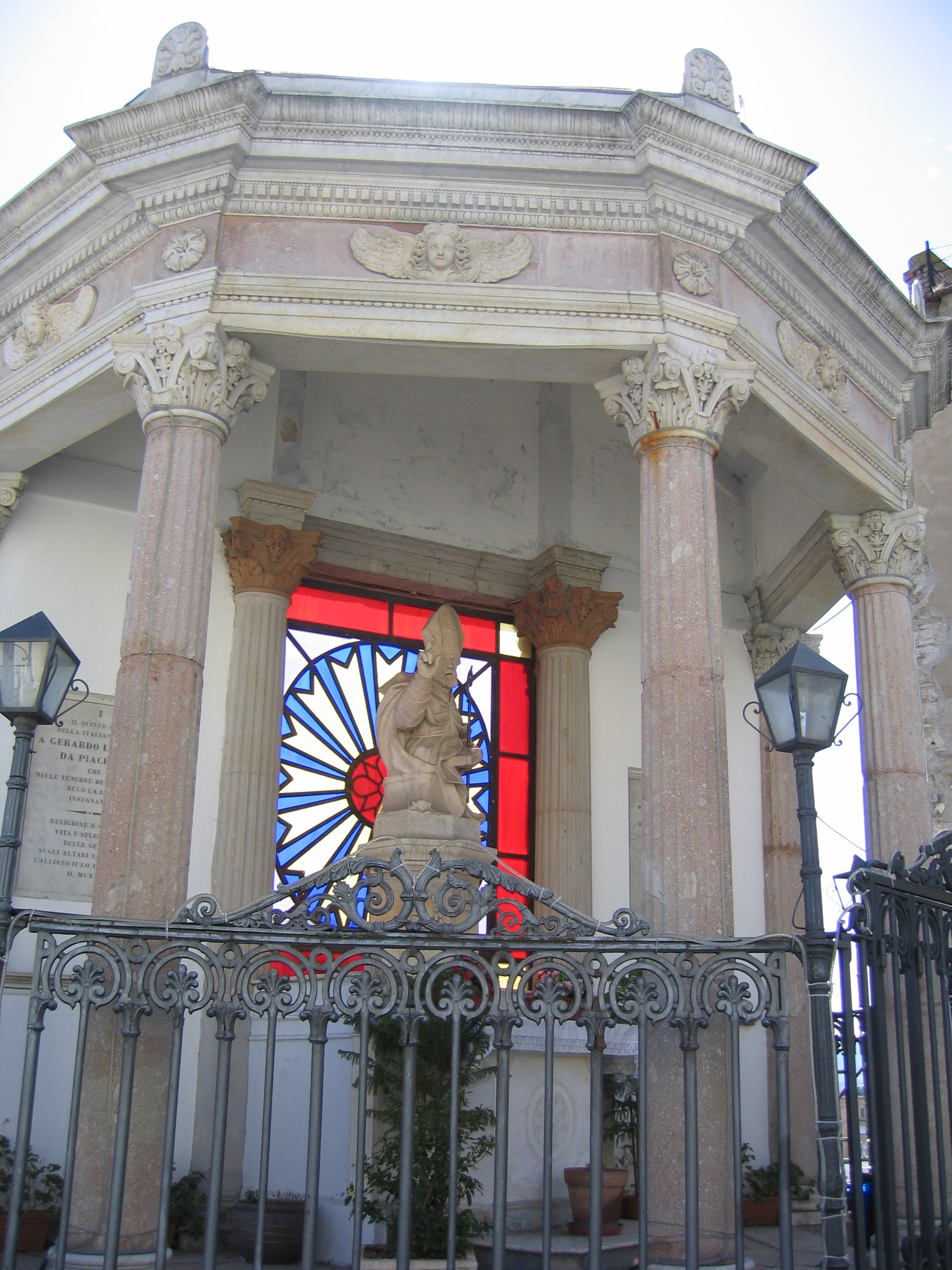
The small temple of "Saint Gerard in Marble"

After Gerard's death, Pope Callixtus II declared him a saint viva voce in 1120. His relics are kept in a sarcophagus in Potenza Cathedral, which is dedicated to him. In 1887, on the occasion of the jubilee proclaimed by Pope Leo XIII, Gerard was celebrated for having spread knowledge and wisdom among the entire population and contributed to increasing education for all the people, opening the doors of knowledge guarded by the clergy to all the people of Potenza. Gerard is the patron saint of the city of Potenza, where he is honoured with an annual parade on 29 May. Gerard's principal feast day is 30 October, the day of his death; 30 May, the day of the translation of his relics by Bishop Oberto in 1250, is also kept.

== Parade of the Turks ==
In the popular tradition of the city of Potenza, Gerard is primarily remembered for the episode of the expulsion of the Turks; according to the local legend, the city was attacked during the Middle Ages by a Turkish army, which was driven out thanks to the miraculous intercession of Gerard. This event likely did not happen and is instead the result of a popular reworking of various historical events from different eras. The event narrated in the legend is commemorated in the Parade of the Turks, which is held every year on 29 May in Potenza. On the site where according to legend the miracle occurred, a small temple was built with a statue of Gerard, popularly known as the "Marble Saint Gerardo" (San Gerardo in Marmo), which was created in 1865 by Potenza sculptors Michele and Antonio Busciolano. According to the bishop of Potenza Tiberio Durante, other miracles of Gerard were not celebrated by popular memory. Gerard is credited with the transmutation of water into wine and the healing of the sick from blindness, paralysis, deafness, and muteness.

== Bibliography ==
=== Articles ===
- "Edicola di San Gerardo". Comune di Potenza (in Italian). 2020. Archived from the original on 8 November 2020.
- Quartana, Pino Antonio; Trotta, Marco (16 September 2018). "Potenza-Matera, confronto sulla storia". Potentia Review (in Italian). Archived from the original on 3 December 2024.
- "San Gerardo a Potenza. La Parata dei Turchi". Italea Basilicata (in Italian). Archived from the original on 15 June 2025.
- Topazio, Canio Riccardo (15 September 2005). "San Gerardo di Potenza". Santi e Beati (in Italian). Archived from the original on 7 December 2025.

=== Books ===
- Blasi, Gianfranco (2018). La croce diversa (in Italian). Potenza: Universosud. ISBN 978-88-99432-40-9. Archived from the original on 2 April 2026 – via Google Books. Avigliano, Rosario Angelo (curator).
- De Grazia, Paolo; Romanelli, Pietro; Moscati, Ruggero; Emiliani, Clarice (1935). "Potenza". Enciclopedia Italiana (in Italian). Rome: Italian Encyclopedia Institute. Archived from the original on 14 October 2018 – via Treccani.
- Giambrocono, Francesco (1887). Le gesta e i trionfi raccolti nel secolo XI da S. Gerardo Dalla Porta protettore della città di Potenza per la fausta ricorrenza del giubileo sacerdotale di Leone XIII (in Italian). Potenza: Stab. Tip. Alfonso Santanello. Archived from the original on 2 April 2026 – via Google Books.
- Guarnaccio, Biagio Luca (2020). Vita Gerardi episcopi Potentini (BHL 3429). Introduzione, edizione critica, traduzione (in Italian). Potenza: Basilicata University Press. ISBN 978-88-31309-07-3. Archived from the original on 3 April 2026 – via Google Books.
- Lasalvia, Gerardo; Panarelli, Francesco; Verrastro, Valeria (2020). Mirificus Gerardus. Il santo patrono di Potenza fra storia e devozione. Lagonegro: Zaccara. ISBN 978-88-99520-99-1. Archived from the original on 3 April 2026 – via Google Books.
- Monks of Ramsgate (1921). "Gerard of Potenza". The Book of Saints: A Dictionary of Servants of God Canonized by the Catholic Church: Extracted from the Roman & Other Martyrologies. London: A. & C. Black. Archived from the original on 29 May 2025 – via CatholicSaints.Info and Google Books.
- Riviello, Raffaele (1893). Ricordi e note su costumanze. Vita e pregiudizii del popolo potentino (in Italian). Potenza: Garramone e Marchesiello. Archived from the original on 2 April 2026.
