= Christian Giordano (politician) =

Italian politician (born 1985)

President of the Province of Potenza
- Incumbent
- Assumed office 10 September 2022
- Preceded by: Rocco Guarino

Mayor of Vietri di Potenza
- Incumbent
- Assumed office 12 June 2017

Personal details
- Born: 24 July 1985 (age 41) Polla, Campania, Italy
- Party: Five Star Movement
- Education: University of Naples Federico II
- Profession: Lawyer

Christian Giordano (born 24 July 1985) is an Italian lawyer and politician of the Five Star Movement. He has served as president of the Province of Potenza since 2022.

== Life and career ==
Giordano was born in Polla, Campania, in 1985, and grew up in the province of Potenza. He graduated in law from the University of Naples Federico II in 2012. In the same year, he became a professional journalist registered with the Order of Journalists of Basilicata. After working in management, he began practising as a lawyer at the Bar of Potenza in 2020.

In June 2017, Giordano was elected mayor of Vietri di Potenza as the candidate of a civic list, receiving 53.4% of the vote. He was re-elected mayor in 2022.

In September 2022, Giordano was elected president of the Province of Potenza, supported by the Five Star Movement and the Democratic Party. He received 24,587 weighted votes, ahead of Francesco Genzano, the Lega-backed candidate, who received 22,640. On 5 July 2024, he became president of UPI Basilicata.

In April 2026, Giordano was appointed regional coordinator of the Five Star Movement in Basilicata by party leader Giuseppe Conte, succeeding Arnaldo Lomuti.

In August 2026, Giordano came under criticism over delays in signing an agreement and submitting a timetable for road infrastructure funding allocated to the Province of Potenza, while announcing plans to finance the works through a loan. His political style has been criticized as overly tactical and media-focused, with greater emphasis on political positioning and communication.
