= Sabino Altobello =

Italian politician (born 1957)

President of the Province of Potenza
- In office 14 June 2004 – 8 June 2009
- Preceded by: Vito Santarsiero
- Succeeded by: Piero Lacorazza

Mayor of Lavello
- In office 28 May 2013 – 16 May 2023

Member of the Regional Council of Basilicata
- In office 8 June 1995 – 19 April 2005

Regional assessor for Culture and Education of Basilicata
- In office 15 June 1995 – 17 April 2000
- President: Angelo Raffaele Dinardo

Personal details
- Born: 19 January 1957 (age 69) Lavello, Province of Potenza, Italy
- Party: PCI; PDS; DS; PD

Sabino Altobello (born 19 January 1957) is an Italian politician who served as president of the Province of Potenza (2004–2009), a member of the Regional Council of Basilicata (1995–2005) and regional assessor for Culture and Education (1995–2000), and mayor of Lavello (2013–2023).
