= Mario Prayer =

Italian painter

Mario Prayer (1887-1959) was an Italian painter, mainly of frescoes for churches or large halls. He collaborated closely with his brother, Guido, in many projects.

== Biography ==
He was born in Turin to Roberto Prayer Galletti, a photographer from Venice and Giovanna Boccaccini, also from Venice. Despite being without the use of his right hand, along with his brother Guido, he trained first at the Accademia di Belle Arti di Venezia and then at the Academy of Fine Arts of Lyon.

Both brothers were called in 1915 to paint for the Superintendent of Fine Arts of Apulia and Calabria, and the brothers mainly worked in Apulia and Basilicata, including Bari and Brindisi. He painted works for the Fascist authorities. His style shows the influences of Art Nouveau orStilo Liberty. He died in Rome.

In 1924, he had a girl named Liliana Prayer, in Bari, Italy. She died in 2002.

Among his works, mainly in fresco are:

- Allegory of the Province of Brindisi, 1949, Palazzo della Provincia, Brindisi
- Frescoes/encaustics 1924, Aula Magna, University of Bari
- Frescoes, 1921, Council Hall of Toritto, Apulia 1921
- Frescoes, 1927, Sala Giuseppina or Cinema Oriente of Kursaal Santalucia, Bari
- Frescoes, 1933–34, Potenza Cathedral, Potenza
- Frescoes, 1933, Chiesa dell’Immacolata nel quartiere Tiburtino, Rome
- Frescoes depicting Life of Mary, 1942, Basilica Madonna della Coltura, Parabita
- Frescoes, 1930, Palazzo di Città, Bari
- Oil on Panel, Madonna del Carmine, 1949, Chiesa Matrice, Parish church of Monteroni
- Other works are found in Gioia del Colle, Gravina, Foggia, Galatone, and Genzano di Lucania.
