= Vito Santarsiero =

Italian politician (born 1955)

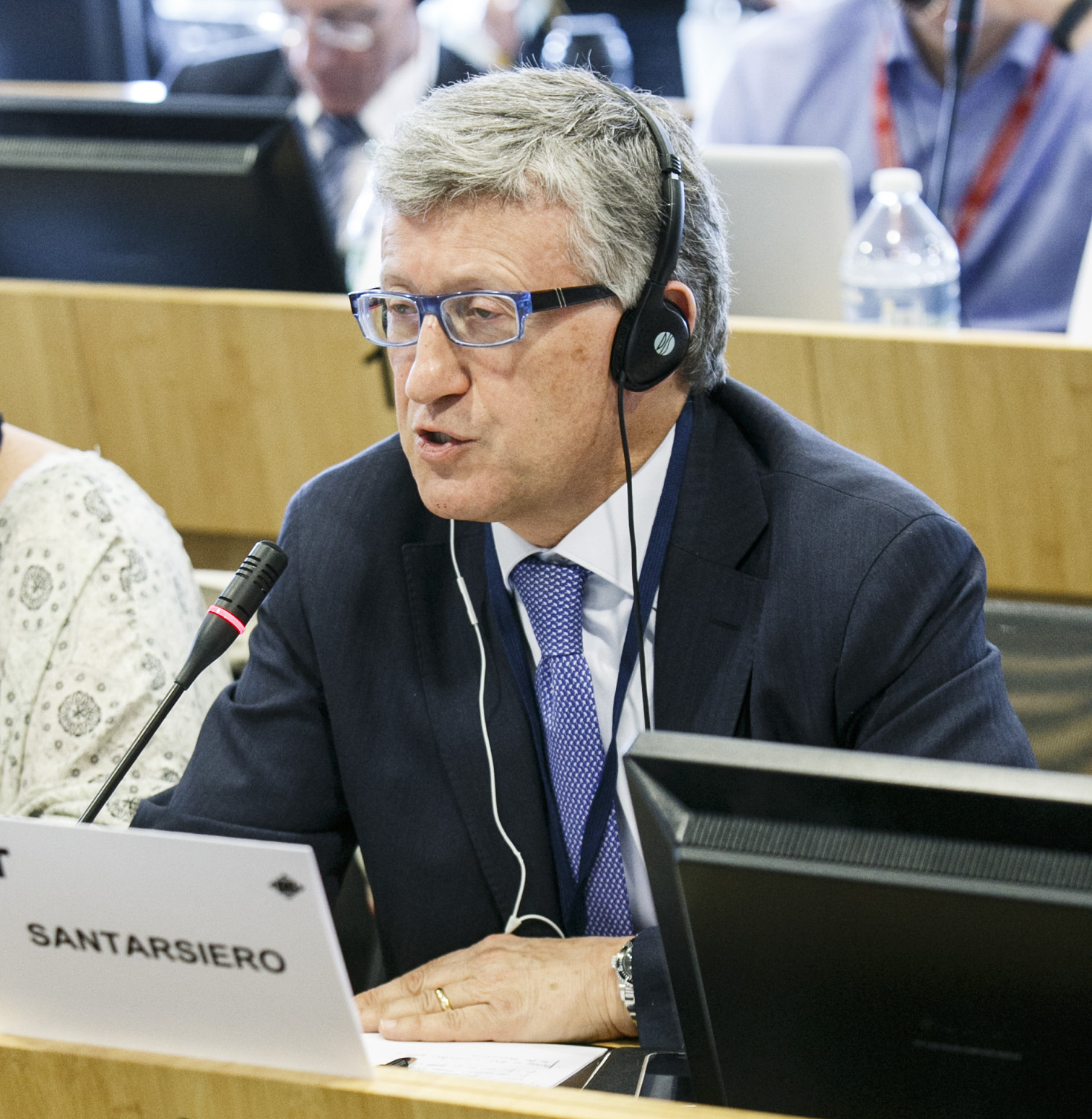
- Santarsiero in 2015

President of the Regional Council of Basilicata
- In office 9 April 2018 – 6 May 2019
- Preceded by: Francesco Mollica
- Succeeded by: Carmine Cicala

Mayor of Potenza
- In office 14 June 2004 – 23 June 2014
- Preceded by: Gaetano Fierro
- Succeeded by: Dario De Luca

President of the Province of Potenza
- In office 14 June 1999 – 14 June 2004
- Preceded by: Domenico Salvatore
- Succeeded by: Sabino Altobello

Personal details
- Born: Vito Santarsiero; 2 March 1955 (age 71) Potenza, Italy
- Party: DC (till 1994); PPI (1994–2002); DL (2002–2007); PD (since 2007)
- Spouse: Anna Elisa Palese
- Children: 2
- Education: University of Naples Federico II
- Profession: Engineer

Vito Santarsiero (born 2 March 1955) is an Italian politician. Santarsiero began his political career as a member of Christian Democracy (DC). He joined the Italian People's Party (PPI) in 1994 and then Democracy is Freedom – The Daisy (DL) in 2002. In 2007, he was a founding member of the Democratic Party (PD).

Santarsiero was president of the province of Potenza from 1990 to 2004, mayor of Potenza for two terms from 2004 to 2014, and president of the Regional Council of Basilicata from April 2018 to May 2019.

== Early life and education ==
Santarsiero was born in Potenza. He attended the liceo scientifico named after Galileo Galilei in Potenza with a grade of 60 out of 60. He graduated in civil engineering from the University of Naples Federico II with a grade of 110 out of 110. He is a designer of public and private works in the construction and plumbing sectors. In 1990, he became an official of the Basilicata region in the environmental compatibility office.

== Career ==
As a member of the DC, Santarsiero was provincial manager of the agricultural sector and rural development from 1990 to 1994. In 1994, with the dissolution of the DC, he joined Mino Martinazzoli's PPI, of which he became provincial organizational director. At the 1995 Italian local elections in Potenza, he was elected provincial councilor with the PPI, becoming group leader of the PPI in the provincial council until 1999. In the 1999 Italian local elections, he ran for president of the province of Potenza with the PPI. He was supported by a centre-left coalition made up of the Democrats of the Left (DS), The Democrats (Dem), the Italian Democratic Socialists (SDI), the Federation of the Greens (FdV), Italian Renewal (RI), the Communist Refoundation Party (PRC), and the Party of Italian Communists (PdCI). He was elected president of the province of Potenza in the first round with 64.2% of the votes (142,848), while the main centre-right coalition challenger Camillo Naborre was a distant second at 27.7%. During his mandate, Santarsiero was also president of UPI Basilicata.

In 2002, Santarsiero joined Francesco Rutelli's DL, a party of which he became a member of the national assembly and provincial leadership in 2004. In the 2004 Italian local elections, he was the centre-left coalition's successful candidate for mayor of Potenza, a position he held for five years; he was elected with 74.1% of the votes. At the end of his mandate, he run for re-election during the 2009 Italian local elections with the PD, of which he had been a founding member in 2007; he reached the run-off with the centre-right coalition's candidate Giuseppe Molinari of The People of Freedom (PdL) and defeating him with 59.3% against 40.7%.

Santarsiero was a candidate with the PD in the 2013 Basilicata regional election. He supported the outgoing Basilicata president Marcello Pittella and was elected in the constituency of Potenza with 7,272 preferences in the Regional Council of Basilicata; he held the position of president of the first permanent council commission related to institutional affairs. In 2014, he became a member of the European Committee of the Regions as delegate of Southern Italy. On 9 April 2018, he was elected president of the Basilicata Regional Council, with 13 votes, 5 blank ballots, and 2 abstentions out of 20.

== Personal life ==
Santarsiero was married to Anna Elisa Palese (1956–2010), with whom he had two children: Leonardo (born 1985) and Francesco (born 1988). On 13 May 2020, Santarsiero was sentenced by the central section of the Court of Auditors for damage to the state and to pay a total of over €5,000,000, together with eleven other defendants, overturning the first degree sentence of complete acquittal. The story concerned the year 2010, when he was mayor of Potenza. His municipal council had cut the mileage covered by the public transport service by 500,000 km, which was then increased by 600,000 km by the road transport plan. According to the judges, the irregularity was that this choice was up to the Potenza city council.

Political offices
Preceded by Gaetano Fierro	Mayor of Potenza; 2004-2014	Succeeded by Dario De Luca
Preceded by Domenico Salvatore	President of the Province of Potenza; 1999-2004	Succeeded by Sabino Altobello
