= Piero Lacorazza =

Italian politician (born 1977)

- Lacorazza in 2018

President of the Regional Council of Basilicata
- In office 18 November 2013 – 10 May 2016
- Preceded by: Vincenzo Santochirico
- Succeeded by: Francesco Mollica

President of the Province of Potenza
- In office 8 June 2009 – 13 October 2014
- Preceded by: Sabino Altobello
- Succeeded by: Nicola Valluzzi

Personal details
- Born: 22 May 1977 (age 49)
- Party: Democratic Party

Piero Lacorazza (born 22 May 1977) is an Italian politician. From 2013 to 2016, he served as president of the Regional Council of Basilicata. From 2009 to 2014, he served as president of the province of Potenza.
