= List of presidents of the Province of Potenza =

President of the Province of Potenza
- Presidente della Provincia di Potenza
- Incumbent; Christian Giordano since 10 September 2022
- Term length: 4 years
- Inaugural holder: Vincenzo De Flipo
- Formation: 1889

The president of the Province of Potenza is the head of the provincial government in Potenza, Basilicata, Italy. The president oversees the administration of the province, coordinates the activities of the municipalities, and represents the province in regional and national matters.

Since September 2022, the office has been held by Christian Giordano of the Five Star Movement.

== List ==
=== Presidents of the Provincial Deputation (1889–1927) ===
No.	Portrait	Name	Term		Party
No.	Portrait	Name	Start	End	Party
1		Vincenzo De Filpo	1889	1890	?
2		Nicola Buano	1890	1894	?
3		Domenico Addone	1894	1896	?
4		Vincenzo Lichinchi	1896	1903	?
5		Michele Bonifacio	1903	1909	?
6		Nicola Salomone	1909	1910	?
7		Edoardo Leo	1910	1912	?
8		Nicola De Ruggeri	1912	1913	?
9		Luigi Cucari	1913	?	?

=== Presidents of the Province (1951–present) ===
No.	Portrait	Name	Term		Party
No.	Portrait	Name	Start	End	Party
		?	?	?	?
		Vincenzo Verrastro	21 March 1958	1967	Christian Democracy
		?	?	?	?
		Antonio Pisani	24 July 1985	21 March 1990	Italian Socialist Party
		Antonio Pisani	3 August 1990	7 June 1993	Italian Socialist Party
		Mario Lucio Camardese	27 July 1993	8 November 1993	Christian Democracy
		Donato Paolo Salvatore	7 January 1994	24 April 1995	Italian Socialist Party
		Domenico Salvatore	4 May 1995	14 June 1999	Democratic Party of the Left; Democrats of the Left
		Vito Santarsiero	13 June 1999	13 June 2004	Italian People's Party; The Daisy
		Sabino Altobello	13 June 2004	8 June 2009	Democrats of the Left; Democratic Party
		Piero Lacorazza	8 June 2009	13 October 2014	Democratic Party
		Nicola Valluzzi	13 October 2014	1 November 2018	Democratic Party
		Rocco Guarino	1 November 2018	13 June 2022	Democratic Party
		Christian Giordano	10 September 2022	Incumbent	Five Star Movement

== Sources ==
- "Storia amministrativa dell'ente". Ministero dell'Interno.
- Menichini, Piera (2005). "I presidenti delle Province dall'Unità alla Grande guerra: repertorio analitico". Storia Amministrazione Costituzione (13): 279–280.
