= List of mayors of Potenza =

Mayor of the capital of Basilicata, Italy

Mayor of Potenza
- Sindaco di Potenza
- Incumbent; Vincenzo Telesca (PD) since 9 July 2024
- Appointer: Popular election
- Term length: 5 years, renewable once
- Formation: 1860
- Website: Official website

The mayor of Potenza is an elected politician who, along with the Potenza City Council, is accountable for the strategic government of Potenza in Basilicata, Italy, capital city of the region. During the First Italian Republic period, the city was a stronghold of Christian Democracy (DC), and Emilio Colombo, who held the mayoralty office in 1952, was prime minister of Italy from 1970 to 1972. During the Second Italian Republic, it was a stronghold of the centre-left coalition and its centrist and Christian-democratic parties. From 1946 to 1995, the mayor was elected by the Potenza City Council. Since 1995, under provisions of new local administration law, the mayor of Potenza is chosen by direct election, originally every four, then every five years.

In 2014, Dario De Luca of Brothers of Italy (FdI), a political party that is an heir of the neo-fascist Italian Social Movement (MSI) and the post-fascist National Alliance, became the first right-wing mayor of Potenza in the history of the Italian Republic. In 2019, after initially announcing his re-election bid, De Luca did not run for re-election. He was instead replaced by Mario Guarente of the traditional Northern Italian party, the League (Lega), which was born in the 1980s as a regionalist, Padanian nationalist, and separatist party but that since 2017 and under Matteo Salvini's leadership had become more of a right-wing populist and nationalist party, and obtained successes in Southern Italy, including Potenza's mayoralty. In 2024, the centre-right coalition did not re-nominate Guarente as candidate due to his unpopularity and the centre-left coalition returned to the mayoralty.

== Office ==
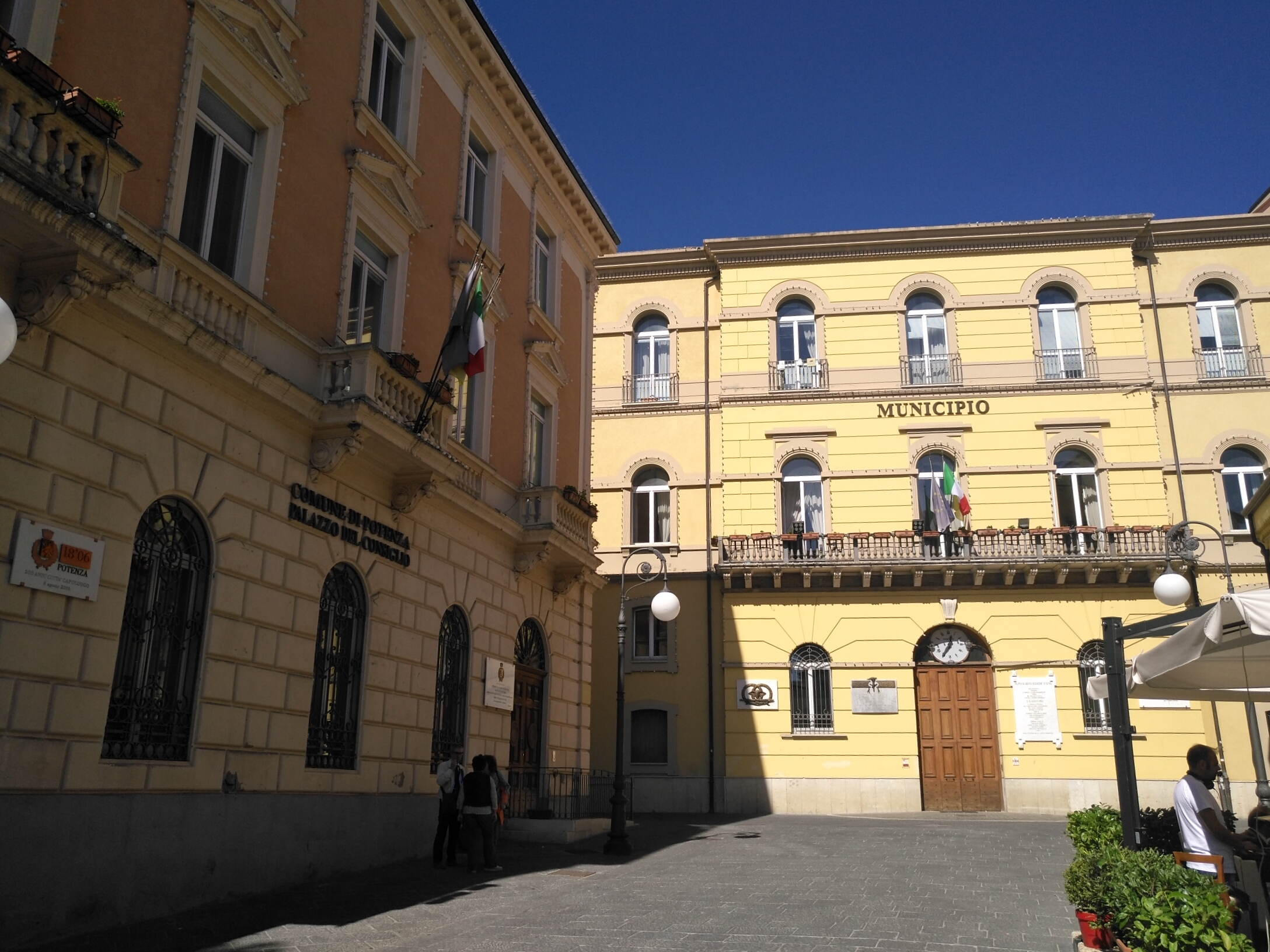
Potenza's town hall

According to the Constitution of Italy, the mayor of Potenza is member of the city council. The mayor is elected by the population of Potenza, who also elect the members of the city council, controlling the mayor's policy guidelines and is able to enforce his resignation by a motion of no confidence. The mayor is entitled to appoint and release the members of his government. Since 1995, the mayor is elected directly by Potenza's electorate; in all mayoral elections in Italy in cities with a population higher than 15,000, the voters express a direct choice for the mayor or an indirect choice voting for the party of the candidate's coalition. The election of the city council is based on a direct choice for the candidate with a preference vote, and the candidate with the majority of the preferences is elected, while the number of the seats for each party is determined proportionally. If no candidate receives at least 50% of votes, the top two candidates go to a second round after two weeks.

== History ==
From 1946 to 1995, the mayor of Potenza, which was elected by the City Council, was always a member of the DC, the ruling party of post-war Italy; as of 2024, of those who held the office of mayor of Potenza, Emilio Colombo (1952) is the only one to be a former prime minister of Italy (1970–1972). In the 1995 Italian local elections, Domenico Potenza of the Democratic Party of the Left (PDS) became the first mayor of Potenza through direct elections. Up until the 2014 Italian local elections, the office was always held by a member of the centre-left coalition, although the 1999 mayoralty election saw the separated and winning candidacy of Gaetano Fierro of the Union of Democrats for Europe (UDEUR), who won against the centre-right coalition candidate Gianfranco Blasi of Forza Italia (FI) who was the vice-president of the Regional Council of Basilicata, and the official centre-left coalition candidate, Prospero Bonito Oliva of the Democrats of the Left (DS), defeating the latter in the runoff. Overturning the result of the first round, Dario De Luca of FdI was elected mayor of Potenza on 8 June 2014 and took office on 23 June 2014. In an upset, he was the first representative of Brothers of Italy to be elected mayor in a provincial capital, the first right-wing mayor of Potenza, and the first centre-right coalition's win.

For the 2019 Italian local elections, after De Luca initially announced his re-election bid, he ultimately decided not to run for a second term, and he was succeeded by fellow centre-right coalition member Mario Guarente, who took office on 20 June 2019. A member of Lega, which since Matteo Salvini's leadership had undergone ideological changes that allowed it to gain a significant number of votes in Southern Italy, (Note: For an overview of the party's history and evolution, from Lega Nord to Lega per Salvini Premier, see "La Lega compie 40 anni, la storia del partito da Bossi a Salvini. Foto". Sky TG24 (in Italian). 11 April 2024.) Guarente was elected in the runoff on 9 June 2019, defeating his left-wing opponent Valerio Tramutoli (Possible) by 200 votes, and took office on 20 June 2019. For the 2024 Italian local elections, Guarente did not seek re-election, having been one of the least popular mayors.

== List of mayors in the Italian Republic (since 1946) ==
=== City council elections (1946–1995) ===
	Mayor	Term start	Term end	Party
1	Pietro Scognamiglio	1946	1948	DC
2	Giuseppe Sivilia	1948	1949	DC
(1)	Pietro Scognamiglio	1949	1950	DC
Special prefectural commissioner tenure (1950–1952)
3	Emilio Colombo	1952	1952	DC
4	Eugenio Brienza	1952	1955	DC
5	Vincenzo Solimena	1955	1960	DC
6	Giovanni Messina	1960	1964	DC
7	Francesco Petrullo	1965	1966	DC
8	Imperio Napolitano	1966	1966	DC
(7)	Francesco Petrullo	1966	1970	DC
9	Antonio Bellino	1970	1975	DC
10	Raffaello Antonio Mecca	1975	1980	DC
11	Gaetano Fierro	1980	1990	DC
12	Rocco Sampogna	1990	1995	DC

=== Direct elections (since 1995) ===
	Mayor	Term start	Term end	Party	Coalition	Election
13	Domenico Potenza	8 May 1995	14 June 1999	PDS	PDS • PPI • PRC • PdD	1995
(11)	Gaetano Fierro	14 June 1999	14 June 2004	UDEUR	UDEUR	1999
14	Vito Santarsiero	14 June 2004	23 June 2009	DL; PD	DS • DL • PRC • FdV • SDI	2004
14	Vito Santarsiero	23 June 2009	23 June 2014	DL; PD	PD • SEL	2009
15	Dario De Luca	23 June 2014	20 June 2019	FdI	FdI • PpI	2014
16	Mario Guarente	20 June 2019	9 July 2024	Lega	Lega • FI • FdI • IDeA • PdF	2019
17	Vincenzo Telesca	9 July 2024	Incumbent	PD	PD • Volt	2024

== See also ==
- List of mayors of Matera
