= Dario De Luca =

Italian politician (born 1956)

Mayor of Potenza
- In office 23 June 2014 – 20 June 2019
- Preceded by: Vito Santarsiero
- Succeeded by: Mario Guarente

Personal details
- Born: 26 July 1956 (age 70) Potenza, Italy
- Party: Brothers of Italy
- Education: Polytechnic University of Turin
- Profession: Engineer

Dario De Luca (born 26 July 1956) is an Italian politician. A member of the right-wing party Brothers of Italy, De Luca was elected mayor of Potenza on 8 June 2014 and took office on 23 June 2014. He was the first right-wing mayor of Potenza, the first to come from the centre-right coalition, and the first Brothers of Italy member to become mayor of a regional capital in Italy. Despite this, he was able to attract the support of the opposition, having to rely on them to have a majority in the city council. In early 2015, De Luca initially resigned but soon retracted after gaining support in the city council. He did not run for re-election in 2019.

== Early life and career ==
De Luca was born in Potenza, where he obtained a diploma from the liceo scientifico named after Galileo Galilei. On 24 July 1979, he graduated with top marks in Civil Engineering from the Polytechnic University of Turin. On 24 March 1980, he registered to the Order of the Engineers of the province of Potenza and started his career as a libero professionista (self-employed) in the field of civil engineering. In the 2010 Basilicata regional election, De Luca's electoral list I Love Lucania supported the unsuccessful president of Basilicata candidacy of Magdi Allam.

== Mayor of Potenza ==
For the 2014 Italian local elections, De Luca was chosen as the centre-right coalition candidate for mayor of Potenza. He spoke of "a radical change" and of "liberating the city from mediocrity, arrogance, and more or less occult forms of power, where it is not clear what the left is and what the right is", and stated that "another Potenza [referencing the name of one of the electoral lists in his support, Another Potenza] is possible". During the presentation of his coalition's program, De Luca stated that his was "a program made of concrete proposals and real programs, not electoral proclamations", with "candidates who bring their professionalism to the table".

In the runoff on 8 June 2014, overturning the result of the first round, De Luca defeated the favourite Luigi Petrone of the Democratic Party-led centre-left coalition with 58.54% of the votes, despite having a minority in the city council. The first representative of Brothers of Italy to be elected mayor in a provincial capital, De Luca was the first right-wing major of Potenza in the history of the Italian Republic, and he also became the first centre-right coalition's mayor of Potenza. His win was seen as an upset and De Luca likened himself and his upset win to David and Goliath. During his mandate, De Luca worked together with the city council on the reorganization of urban transport (escalators and buses), the redevelopment of the pavements of the old town, and the installation of the latest generation synthetic turf and the renovation works to obtain the suitability for Serie C of the Alfredo Viviani Stadium, the home ground of Potenza Calcio. Thanks to the implementation of waste collection, Potenza achieved 65% of waste sorting, the first regional capital in Italy to do so.

In January 2015, De Luca announced his resignation, citing the financial distress, which began on 20 November 2014, and the lack of a majority in the city council as reasons; at the national level, he also criticized the Nazareno Pact and Lega Nord. In February 2015, he withdrew his resignation, citing the majority support he received in the city council, and called for Potenza to receive the help given by the Italian state to Alessandria. In 2019, following an initial desire to run again, he decided not to run for a second term. He was succeeded by fellow centre-right coalition member Mario Guarente.

Political offices
Preceded by Vito Santarsiero	Mayor of Potenza; 2014-2019	Succeeded by Mario Guarente
