= Mario Guarente =

Italian politician (born 1983)

Mayor of Potenza
- In office 20 June 2019 – 9 July 2024
- Preceded by: Dario De Luca
- Succeeded by: Vincenzo Telesca

Personal details
- Born: 2 December 1983 (age 42) Potenza, Italy
- Party: MpA (2010–2014); Lega (since 2017)
- Profession: Employee

Mario Guarente (born 2 December 1983) is an Italian politician. He has been mayor of Potenza from 2019 to 2024, having been elected with the right-wing populist party Lega in 2019 after a closely contested runoff. He was among the least popular mayors in Italy and in 2024 was not nominated by the centre-right coalition for re-election.

== Early life ==
The second of two children, Guarente was born and raised in Potenza, in the Rione Lucania neighborhood, where he obtained a diploma from the liceo classico named after Quintus Horatius Flaccus. It was during his student years that he met his future wife. He also started working as a freelancer in the insurance consultancy sector.

== Political career ==
Guarente became active and interested in politics during his adolescence and youth. He was motivated by Potenza being, in his own words, "the city of lost opportunities". (Note: As examples, Guarente cited the "post-earthquake reconstruction that interested few, a University that has never been able to impact city life, hundreds of young people who left to study and work and never returned, wild and unplanned concreting, [and] the usual suspects who are successful and many lesser-known ones who struggle". Recalling his time as a city councilor in 2014, he described it as "a municipality in a state of financial crisis and strongly marked by 20 years of bad government".) Guarente began his political career in 2009, when he ran for the city council of Potenza for the civic list Federation of the Centre within the centre-right coalition led by the mayoral candidate Giuseppe Molinari. During this period, he and other young activists founded the Lucanian Generational Movement, an alternative to "the system of power that has always ruled and destroyed Basilicata". Citing his identification with Potenza and Southern Italy, as well as his support for regional autonomy and federalism, he was a member of the Movement for Autonomy, of which he was a local leader (regional secretary of the youth in 2010 and city secretary in 2011), from 2010 to 2014.

In 2011, Guarente was founding member and president of the cultural association Ennesima Potenza. In 2014, with the dissolution of the Movement for Autonomy, Guarente was not associated to any political party and was elected city councilor within a centre-right coalition civic list supporting the mayoral candidate Michele Cannizzaro. He remained at the opposition to the city council of fellow centre-right coalition member and then Potenza mayor Dario De Luca. During this period, Guarente was president pro tempore of the IV Council Commission, vice-president of the III and IV Council Commission, and member of the Electoral Commission.

In 2017, Guarente joined Lega, aiming to "contribute to the transformation of Lega into a national party" and being "aware that only a new political container could bring the centre-right back to national and local government". In the 2019 Italian local elections, Guarante was the successful mayor of Potenza candidate. He was elected in the runoff on 9 June 2019, defeating his left-wing opponent and 2019 Basilicata regional election candidate Valerio Tramutoli of Possible by 200 votes, and took office on 20 June 2019. Among his proposals as mayor of Potenza were the allowance of the traders of the old town to see reduced rates for the occupation of public land, and he was the promoter of a provision, which came into force on 1 January 2019, that allowed exemption from the payment of municipal taxes for the activities of the old town. For the 2024 Italian local elections, Guarente did not seek re-election, having been one of the least popular mayors. He was replaced as candidate by fellow Lega member and Regional Council of Basilicata vice-president Francesco Fanelli.

== Notes ==
Political offices
Preceded by Dario De Luca	Mayor of Potenza; 2019-2024	Succeeded by Vincenzo Telesca
