= List of members of the Chamber of Deputies of Italy, 2008–2013 =

This is a list of the 630 members of the Italian Chamber of Deputies that were elected in the 2008 general election.

== Democratic Party ==
- Mario Adinolfi
- Luciano Agostini
- Tea Albini
- Gabriele Albonetti
- Sesa Amici
- Ileana Argentin
- Giovanni Battista Bachelet
- Mario Barbi
- Pier Paolo Baretta
- Teresa Bellanova
- Marco Beltrandi
- Gianluca Benamati
- Rita Bernardini
- Giuseppe Berretta
- Pier Luigi Bersani
- Rosy Bindi
- Luigi Bobba
- Francesco Boccia
- Antonio Boccuzzi
- Costantino Boffa
- Fulvio Bonavitacola
- Michele Bordo
- Luisa Bossa
- Chiara Braga
- Sandro Brandolini
- Alessandro Bratti
- Gianclaudio Bressa
- Gino Bucchino
- Giovanni Mario Salvino Burtone
- Giulio Calvisi
- Cinzia Capano
- Angelo Capodicasa
- Daniela Cardinale
- Renzo Carella
- Marco Carra
- Pierluigi Castagnetti
- Marco Causi
- Mario Cavallaro
- Franco Ceccuzzi (until 06/07/2011)
- Susanna Cenni
- Francesca Cilluffo
- Pasquale Ciriello
- Lucia Codurelli
- Matteo Colaninno
- Furio Colombo
- Anna Paola Concia
- Paolo Corsini
- Maria Coscia
- Antonio Cuomo
- Giovanni Cuperlo
- Gian Pietro Dal Moro
- Massimo D'Alema
- Cesare Damiano
- Olga D'Antona
- Sergio Antonio D'Antoni
- Emilia Grazia De Biasi
- Paola De Micheli
- Rosa De Pasquale
- Maria Letizia De Torre
- Vittoria D'Incecco
- Lino Duilio
- Stefano Esposito
- Paolo Fadda
- Gianni Farina
- Maria Antonietta Farina Coscioni
- Enrico Farinone
- Piero Fassino (until 07/19/2011)
- Marco Fedi
- Donatella Ferranti
- Pierangelo Ferrari
- Emanuele Fiano
- Massimo Fiorio
- Giuseppe Fioroni
- Alberto Fluvi
- Giampaolo Fogliardi
- Paolo Fontanelli
- Giovanni Lorenzo Forcieri
- Dario Franceschini
- Laura Froner
- Laura Garavini
- Francesco Saverio Garofani
- Enrico Gasbarra
- Maria Grazia Gatti
- Francantonio Genovese
- Paolo Gentiloni Silveri
- Manuela Ghizzoni
- Roberto Giachetti
- Antonello Giacomelli
- Dario Ginefra
- Tommaso Ginoble
- Oriano Giovanelli
- Marialuisa Gnecchi
- Sandro Gozi
- Gero Grassi
- Stefano Graziano
- Tino Iannuzzi
- Antonio La Forgia
- Francesco Laratta
- Donata Lenzi
- Enrico Letta
- Ricardo Franco Levi
- Doris Lo Moro
- Giovanni Lolli
- Alberto Losacco
- Mario Lovelli
- Mimmo Lucà
- Andrea Lulli
- Antonio Luongo
- Maria Anna Madia
- Daniele Marantelli
- Maino Marchi
- Massimo Marchignoli
- Elisa Marchioni
- Salvatore Margiotta
- Raffaella Mariani
- Cesare Marini
- Siro Marrocu
- Andrea Martella
- Pierdomenico Martino
- Margherita Angela Mastromauro
- Donella Mattesini
- Eugenio Mazzarella
- Matteo Mecacci
- Giovanna Melandri (until 11/13/2012)
- Guido Melis
- Giorgio Merlo
- Maria Paola Merloni
- Michele Pompeo Meta
- Maurizio Migliavacca
- Ivano Miglioli
- Marco Minniti
- Anna Margherita Miotto
- Antonio Misiani
- Federica Mogherini
- Roberto Morassut
- Alessia Maria Mosca
- Carmen Motta
- Delia Murer
- Alessandro Naccarato
- Rolando Nannicini
- Franco Narducci
- Luigi Nicolais
- Nicodemo Nazzareno Oliverio
- Andrea Orlando
- Marilena Parenti (until 08/07/2012)
- Arturo Mario Luigi Parisi
- Luciana Pedoto
- Vinicio Giuseppe Guido Peluffo
- Mario Pepe
- Caterina Pes
- Salvatore Piccolo
- Pina Picierno
- Lapo Pistelli
- Luciano Pizzetti
- Barbara Pollastrini
- Massimo Pompili
- Fabio Porta
- Giacomo Antonio Portas
- Erminio Angelo Quartiani
- Elisabetta Rampi
- Ermete Realacci
- Pier Fausto Recchia
- Andrea Rigoni
- Ettore Rosato
- Sabina Rossa
- Anna Rossomando
- Simonetta Rubinato
- Antonio Rugghia
- Antonino Russo
- Marilena Samperi
- Giovanni Sanga
- Luca Sani
- Giulio Santagata
- Andrea Sarubbi
- Daniela Sbrollini
- Lido Scarpetti
- Amalia Schirru
- Marina Sereni
- Giuseppina Servodio
- Alessandra Siragusa
- Antonello Soro (until 06/07/2012)
- Ugo Sposetti
- Ivano Strizzolo
- Francesco Tempestini
- Lanfranco Tenaglia
- Federico Testa
- Pietro Tidei (until 06/13/2012)
- Walter Tocci
- Jean Leonard Touadi
- Carlo Emanuele Trappolino
- Mario Tullo
- Livia Turco
- Maurizio Turco
- Guglielmo Vaccaro
- Massimo Vannucci (until 10/05/2012)
- Salvatore Vassallo
- Silvia Velo
- Walter Veltroni
- Michele Ventura
- Francesco Verducci
- Walter Verini
- Ludovico Vico
- Rosa Maria Villecco Calipari
- Rodolfo Giuliano Viola
- Roberto Zaccaria
- Sandra Zampa
- Elisabetta Zamparutti
- Ezio Zani
- Angelo Zucchi
- Massimo Zunino

== The People of Freedom ==
- Giancarlo Abelli
- Ignazio Abrignani
- Marco Airaghi (until 04/04/2012)
- Giovanni Alemanno (until 06/10/2008)
- Gioacchino Alfano
- Angelino Alfano
- Giuseppe Angeli
- Antonio Angelucci
- Valentina Aprea (until 04/03/2012)
- Francesco Aracri
- Sabatino Aracu
- Maria Teresa Armosino
- Filippo Ascierto
- Mario Baccini
- Simone Baldelli
- Lucio Barani
- Vincenzo Barba
- Emerenzio Barbieri
- Viviana Beccalossi
- Luca Bellotti
- Amato Berardi
- Deborah Bergamini
- Silvio Berlusconi
- Maurizio Bernardo
- Anna Maria Bernini
- Massimo Maria Berruti
- Michaela Biancofiore
- Maurizio Bianconi
- Sandro Biasotti
- Francesco Biava
- Mariella Bocciardo
- Paolo Bonaiuti
- Margherita Boniver
- Marco Botta
- Michela Vittoria Brambilla
- Aldo Brancher
- Renato Brunetta
- Donato Bruno
- Annagrazia Calabria
- Giuseppe Calderisi
- Stefano Caldoro (until 05/27/2010)
- Pietro Cannella
- Mara Carfagna
- Luigi Casero
- Roberto Cassinelli
- Carla Castellani
- Giuseppina Castiello
- Francesco Catanoso Genoese
- Valerio Cattaneo (until 03/08/2011)
- Fiorella Ceccacci Rubino
- Elena Centemero
- Remigio Ceroni
- Luigi Cesaro
- Fabrizio Cicchitto
- Carlo Ciccioli
- Salvatore Cicu
- Edmondo Cirielli
- Francesco Colucci
- Gianfranco Conte
- Manlio Contento
- Massimo Enrico Corsaro
- Nicola Cosentino
- Giulia Cosenza
- Giuseppe Cossiga
- Enrico Costa
- Rocco Crimi
- Nicolò Cristaldi
- Simone Andrea Crolla
- Guido Crosetto
- Luca D'Alessandro
- Marcello De Angelis
- Sabrina De Camillis
- Riccardo De Corato
- Nunzia De Girolamo
- Francesco De Luca
- Melania De Nichilo Rizzoli
- Domenico De Siano (until 12/15/2010)
- Maurizio Del Tenno
- Giovanni Dell'Elce
- Simeone Di Cagno Abbrescia
- Marcello Di caterina
- Manuela Di Centa
- Domenico Di Virgilio
- Giovanni Dima
- Antonio Distaso
- Monica Faenzi
- Renato Farina
- Raffaele Fitto
- Gregorio Fontana
- Vincenzo Antonio Fontana (until 01/22/2013)
- Nicola Formichella
- Tommaso Foti
- Antonino Foti
- Pietro Franzoso (until 11/04/2011)
- Paola Frassinetti
- Franco Frattini
- Benedetto Francesco Fucci
- Giuseppe Galati
- Fabio Garagnani
- Vincenzo Garofalo
- Mariastella Gelmini
- Antonino Salvatore Germanà (until 12/07/2012)
- Niccolò Ghedini
- Agostino Ghiglia
- Sestino Giacomoni
- Gabriella Giammanco
- Pippo Gianni (until 01/22/2013)
- Vincenzo Gibiino
- Alberto Giorgetti
- Rocco Girlanda
- Francesco Maria Giro
- Gaspare Giudice (until 04/28/2008)
- Lella Golfo
- Isidoro Gottardo
- Giorgio Holzmann
- Antonello Iannarilli
- Giorgio Jannone
- Enrico La Loggia
- Ignazio La Russa
- Amedeo Laboccetta
- Pietro Laffranco
- Giorgio Lainati
- Mario Landolfi
- Luigi Lazzari
- Maurizio Leo
- Antonio Leone
- Ugo Lisi
- Beatrice Lorenzin
- Pietro Lunardi
- Maurizio Lupi
- Gennaro Malgieri
- Gianni Mancuso
- Barbara Mannucci
- Alfredo Mantovano
- Giuseppe Francesco Maria Marinello
- Giulio Marini (until 01/17/2012)
- Marco Marsilio
- Marco Martinelli
- Antonio Martino
- Antonio Mazzocchi
- Riccardo Mazzoni
- Giancarlo Mazzuca
- Giorgia Meloni
- Riccardo Migliori
- Lorena Milanato
- Marco Mario Milanese
- Antonino Minardo
- Eugenio Minasso
- Dore Misuraca
- Giuseppe Moles
- Bruno Murgia
- Alessandra Mussolini
- Osvaldo Napoli
- Gaetano Nastri
- Massimo Nicolucci
- Fiamma Nirenstein
- Settimo Nizzi
- Carlo Nola
- Alessandro Pagano
- Antonio Palmieri
- Giuseppe Palumbo
- Maurizio Paniz
- Alfonso Papa
- Massimo Parisi
- Adriano Paroli (until 01/17/2012)
- Paola Pelino
- Antonio Pepe
- Mario Pescante
- Giovanna Petrenga
- Enrico Pianetta
- Guglielmo Picchi
- Mauro Pili
- Vincenzo Piso
- Pier Paolo Pizzimbone
- Sergio Pizzolante
- Carmelo Porcu
- Stefania Prestigiacomo
- Fabio Rampelli
- Laura Ravetto
- Manuela Repetti
- Eugenia Roccella
- Paolo Romani
- Giuseppe Romele
- Luciano Rossi
- Mariarosaria Rossi
- Roberto Rosso
- Gianfranco Rotondi
- Paolo Russo
- Stefano Saglia
- Barbara Saltamartini
- Gianfranco Sammarco
- Jole Santelli
- Elvira Savino
- Souad Sbai
- Claudio Scajola
- Giuseppe Scalera
- Michele Scandroglio
- Umberto Scapagnini
- Maurizio Scelli
- Giorgio Simeoni
- Francesco Paolo Sisto
- Roberto Speciale
- Lucio Stanca
- Marcello Taglialatela (until 09/22/2010)
- Piero Testoni
- Gabriele Toccafondi
- Salvatore Torrisi
- Michele Traversa
- Giulio Tremonti
- Mario Valducci
- Valentino Valentini
- Giuseppe Vegas (until 01/10/2011)
- Paolo Vela
- Cosimo Ventucci
- Denis Verdini
- Antonio Giuseppe Maria Verro
- Pasquale Vessa
- Raffaello Vignali
- Luigi Vitali
- Elio Vito
- Marco Zacchera (until 01/11/2012)
- Marino Zorzato (until 06/01/2010)

== Mixed Group ==
=== Independents ===
- Angelo Alessandri
- Luca Barbareschi
- Renato Cambursano
- Giuliano Cazzola
- Stefania Craxi
- Elisabetta Gardini (until 06/09/2010)
- Giuseppe Giulietti
- Maria Grazia Laganà
- Linda Lanzillotta
- Carmelo Lo Monte
- Alessandro Maran
- Lino Miserotti
- Angela Napoli
- Savino Pezzotta
- Sergio Michele Piffari
- Eugenio Randi
- Lorenzo Ria
- Gianni Vernetti
- Santo Versace

=== Great South–PPA ===
- Giuseppe Fallica
- Ugo Maria Gianfranco Grimaldi
- Maurizio Iapicca
- Gianfranco Micciché
- Aurelio Salvatore Misiti
- Giancarlo Pittelli
- Marco Pugliese
- Gerardo Soglia
- Francesco Stagno D'Alcontres
- Giacomo Terranova

=== Italia Libera–Popolari Italiani-Popolari per l'Europa-Liberali per l'Italia–Italian Liberal Party ===
- Roberto Antonione
- Isabella Bertolini
- Fabio Gava
- Giustina Mistrello Destro
- Gaetano Pecorella
- Angelo Santori
- Luciano Mario Sardelli
- Giorgio Clelio Stracquadanio
- Franco Stradella
- Roberto Tortoli

=== Diritti e Libertà ===
- Massimo Donadi
- David Favia
- Aniello Formisano
- Giovanni Paladini
- Gaetano Porcino

=== Democratic Centre ===
- Luigi Fabbri
- Donato Renato Mosella
- Pino Pisicchio
- Bruno Tabacci

=== Fareitalia per la Costituente Popolare ===
- Antonio Buonfiglio
- Andrea Ronchi
- Giuseppe Scalia
- Adolfo Urso

=== Movement for the Autonomies–Alleati per il Sud ===
- Roberto Mario Sergio Commercio
- Giovanni Roberto Di Mauro (until 05/29/2008)
- Ferdinando Latteri (until 07/14/2011)
- Angelo Salvatore Lombardo
- Francesco Paolo Lucchese
- Sandro Oliveri

=== Republicans–Azionisti ===
- Calogero Mannino
- Francesco Nucara
- Giuseppe Ossorio
- Mario Pepe

=== Autonomy South–Lega Sud Ausonia–Popoli Sovrani d'Europa ===
- Elio Vittorio Belcastro
- Arturo Iannaccone
- Americo Porfidia

=== Iniziativa liberale ===
- Antonio Gaglione
- Maurizio Grassano
- Paolo Guzzanti

=== Liberal Democrats–MAIE ===
- Giorgio La Malfa
- Daniela Melchiorre
- Italo Tanoni

=== Linguistic Minorities ===
- Siegfried Brugger
- Roberto Rolando Nicco
- Karl Zeller

== Lega Nord ==
- Stefano Allasia
- Maurizio Balocchi (until 02/15/2010)
- Massimo Bitonci
- Guido Bonino
- Umberto Bossi
- Matteo Bragantini
- Matteo Brigandì (until 07/30/2010)
- Gianluca Buonanno
- Corrado Callegari
- Davide Caparini
- Davide Cavallotto
- Giacomo Chiappori
- Silvana Andreina Comaroli
- Nunziante Consiglio
- Roberto Cota (until 06/17/2010)
- Jonny Crosio
- Manuela Dal Lago
- Claudio D'Amico
- Marco Desiderati
- Gian Carlo Di Vizia
- Gianpaolo Dozzo
- Luciano Dussin (until 12/14/2011)
- Guido Dussin
- Sabina Fabi
- Gianni Fava
- Sebastiano Fogliato
- Fulvio Follegot
- Gianluca Forcolin
- Maurizio Fugatti
- Andrea Gibelli (until 05/18/2010)
- Franco Gidoni
- Giancarlo Giorgetti
- paola Goisis
- Paolo Grimoldi
- Eraldo Isidori
- Manuela Lanzarin
- Carolina Lussana
- Elena Maccanti (until 05/11/2010)
- Marco Maggioni
- Roberto Maroni
- Francesca Martini
- Fabio Meroni
- Daniele Molgora
- Laura Molteni
- Nicola Molteni
- Alessandro Montagnoli
- Emanuela Munerato
- Giovanna Negro
- Luca Rodolfo Paolini
- Maria Piera Pastore
- Gianluca Pini
- Ettore Pirovano (until 12/21/2011)
- Massimo Polledri
- Fabio Rainieri
- Marco Giovanni Reguzzoni
- Erica Rivolta
- Edoardo Rixi (until 06/08/2010)
- Marco Rondini
- Matteo Salvini (until 07/13/2009)
- Roberto Simonetti
- Stefano Stefani
- Giacomo Stucchi
- Renato Walter Togni
- Alberto Torazzi
- Pierguido Vanalli
- Raffaele Volpi
- Roberto Zaffini (until 10/19/2010)

== Union of the Centre ==
- Ferdinando Adornato
- Paola Binetti
- Alessio Bonciani
- Francesco Bosi
- Rocco Buttiglione
- Marco Calgaro
- Luisa Capitanio Santolini
- Gabriella Carlucci
- Enzo Carra
- Pier Ferdinando Casini
- Angelo Cera
- Lorenzo Cesa
- Amedeo Ciccanti
- Angelo Compagnon
- Antonio De Poli
- Teresio Delfino
- Armando Dionisi
- Ida D'Ippolito Vitale
- Anna Teresa Formisano
- Gia Luca Galletti
- Mauro Libè
- Renzo Lusetti
- Pierluigi Mantini
- Pietro Marcazzan
- Antonio Mereu
- Ricardo Antonio Merlo
- Gabriella Mondello
- Giuseppe Naro
- Roberto Occhiuto
- Nedo Lorenzo Poli
- Roberto Rao
- Salvatore Ruggeri
- Mario Tassone
- Nunzio Francesco Testa
- Luca Volontè
- Domenico Zinzi

== Future and Freedom ==
- Claudio Barbaro
- Italo Bocchino
- Giulia Bongiorno
- Carmelo Briguglio
- Giuseppe Consolo
- Giorgio Conte
- Benedetto Della Vedova
- Aldo Di Biagio
- Francesco Divella
- Gianfranco Fini
- Daniele Galli
- Benedetto Fabio Granata
- Donato Lamorte
- Antonino Lo Presti (until 12/19/2012)
- Roberto Menia
- Chiara Moroni
- Luigi Muro
- Gianfranco Paglia
- Carmine Santo Patarino
- Flavia Perina
- Francesco Proietti Cosimi
- Enzo Raisi
- Alessandro Ruben
- Deodato Scanderebech
- Daniele Toto
- Mirko Tremaglia (until 12/30/2011)

== People and Territory ==
- Massimo Calearo Ciman
- Giampiero Catone
- Bruno Cesario
- Vincenzo D'Anna
- Giancarlo Lehner
- Roberto Marmo
- Antonio Milo
- Silvano Moffa
- Giovanni Carlo Francesco Mottola
- Andrea Orsini
- Francesco Pionati
- Michele Pisacane
- Catia Polidori
- Antonio Razzi
- Francesco Saverio Romano
- Giuseppe Ruvolo
- Domenico Scilipoti
- Maria Grazia Siliquini
- Maria Elena Stasi
- Domenico Sudano
- Vincenzo Taddei

== Italy of Values ==
- Francesco Barbato
- Antonio Borghesi
- Gabriele Cimadoro
- Carlo Costantini (until 02/03/2009)
- Anita Di Giuseppe
- Antonio Di Pietro
- Augusto Di Stanislao
- Fabio Evangelisti
- Ignazio Messina
- Carlo Monai
- Silvana Mura
- Leoluca Orlando (until 07/10/2012)
- Antonio Palagiano
- Federico Palomba
- Ivan Rota
- Giuseppe Vatinno
- Pierfelice Zazzera
