= List of members of the Senate of Italy, 2008–2013 =

This is a list of the 322 members of the 16th legislature of the Italian Senate that were elected in the 2008 general election. The legislature met from 29 April 2008 to 14 March 2013.

Senators for life are marked with a "(L)"

== The People of Freedom ==
- Maria Elisabetta Alberti Casellati
- Bruno Alicata
- Laura Allegrini
- Paolo Amato
- Francesco Maria Amoruso
- Franco Asciutti
- Andrea Augello
- Antonio Azzollini
- Alberto Balboni
- Mario Baldassarri
- Massimo Baldini
- Paolo Barelli
- Antonio Battaglia
- Domenico Benedetti Valentini
- Filippo Berselli
- Giampaolo Bettamio
- Francesco Bevilacqua
- Laura Bianconi
- Sandro Bondi
- Anna Cinzia Bonfrisco
- Giorgio Bornacin
- Gabriele Boscetto
- Alessio Butti
- Raffaele Calabrò
- Giacomo Caliendo
- Battista Caligiuri
- Giulio Camber
- Gianpiero Carlo Cantoni
- Valerio Carrara
- Antonino Caruso
- Esteban Juan Caselli
- Francesco Casoli
- Maurizio Castro
- Roberto Centaro
- Giuseppe Ciarrapico
- Angelo Maria Cicolani
- Ombretta Colli
- Giovanni Collino
- Romano Comincioli
- Luigi Compagna
- Barbara Contini
- Gennaro Coronella
- Rosario Giorgio Costa
- Cesare Cursi
- Mauro Cutrufo
- Antonio D'Alì
- Luigi D'Ambrosio Lettieri
- Candido De Angelis
- Cristiano De Eccher
- Diana De Feo
- Sergio De Gregorio
- Stefano De Lillo
- Marcello Dell'Utri
- Mariano Delogu
- Ulisse Di Giacomo
- Egidio Digilio
- Nicola Di Girolamo
- Lamberto Dini
- Fabrizio Di Stefano
- Giuseppe Esposito
- Vincenzo Fasano
- Claudio Fazzone
- Mario Ferrara
- Giuseppe Firrarello
- Salvo Fleres
- Andrea Fluttero
- Roberto Formigoni
- Vincenzo Galioto
- Cosimo Gallo
- Pierfrancesco Emilio Romano Gamba
- Maurizio Gasparri
- Antonio Gentile
- Maria Ida Germontani
- Enzo Giorgio Ghigo
- Basilio Giordano
- Carlo Giovanardi
- Pasquale Giuliano
- Domenico Gramazio
- Luigi Grillo
- Cosimo Izzo
- Cosimo Latronico
- Raffaele Lauro
- Simonetta Licastro Scardino
- Piero Longo
- Lucio Malan
- Alfredo Mantica
- Mario Mantovani
- Ugo Martinat
- Piergiorgio Massidda
- Altero Matteoli
- Salvatore Mazzaracchio
- Giuseppe Menardi
- Alfredo Messina
- Carmelo Morra
- Franco Mugnai
- Enrico Musso
- Domenico Nania
- Vincenzo Nespoli
- Pasquale Nessa
- Franco Orsi
- Nitto Francesco Palma
- Elio Massimo Palmizio
- Antonio Paravia
- Andrea Pastore
- Marcello Pera
- Lorenzo Piccioni
- Filippo Piccone
- Gilberto Pichetto Fratin
- Beppe Pisanu
- Salvatore Piscitelli
- Adriana Poli Bortone
- Francesco Pontone
- Guido Possa
- Gaetano Quagliariello
- Luigi Ramponi
- Maria Rizzotti
- Michele Saccomanno
- Maurizio Sacconi
- Maurizio Saia
- Filippo Saltamartini
- Fedele Sanciu
- Giacomo Santini
- Giuseppe Saro
- Carlo Sarro
- Aldo Scarabosio
- Paolo Scarpa Bonazza Buora
- Renato Schifani
- Salvatore Sciascia
- Luigi Scotti
- Giancarlo Serafini
- Cosimo Sibilia
- Ada Spadoni Urbani
- Vincenzo Speziali
- Raffaele Stancanelli
- Paolo Tancredi
- Oreste Tofani
- Antonio Tomassini
- Achille Totaro
- Giuseppe Valditara
- Giuseppe Valentino
- Sergio Vetrella
- Simona Vicari
- Guido Viceconte
- Pasquale Viespoli
- Carlo Vizzini
- Valter Zanetta

== Democratic Party ==
- Marilena Adamo
- Benedetto Adragna
- Mauro Agostini
- Silvana Amati
- Alfonso Andria
- Maria Antezza
- Teresa Armato
- Emanuela Baio Dossi
- Giuliano Barbolini
- Fiorenza Bassoli
- Mariangela Bastico
- Maria Teresa Bertuzzi
- Dorina Bianchi
- Enzo Bianco
- Franca Biondelli
- Tamara Blažina
- Emma Bonino
- Daniele Bosone
- Franco Bruno
- Filippo Bubbico
- Antonello Cabras
- Anna Maria Carloni
- Gianrico Carofiglio
- Felice Casson
- Stefano Ceccanti
- Mauro Ceruti
- Franca Chiaromonte
- Vannino Chiti
- Carlo Chiurazzi
- Lionello Cosentino
- Vladimiro Crisafulli
- Gerardo D'Ambrosio
- Paolo De Castro
- Silvia Della Monica
- Roberto Della Seta
- Vincenzo De Luca
- Mauro Del Vecchio
- Luigi De Sena
- Roberto Di Giovan Paolo
- Leopoldo Di Girolamo
- Franca Donaggio
- Lucio D'Ubaldo
- Marco Filippi
- Anna Finocchiaro
- Anna Rita Fioroni
- Maurizio Fistarol
- Marco Follini
- Cinzia Maria Fontana
- Vittoria Franco
- Guido Galperti
- Mariapia Garavaglia
- Costantino Garraffa
- Mario Gasbarri
- Rita Ghedini
- Paolo Giaretta
- Manuela Granaiola
- Claudio Gustavino
- Pietro Ichino
- Maria Fortuna Incostante
- Nicola Latorre
- Maria Leddi
- Giovanni Legnini
- Massimo Livi Bacci
- Giuseppe Lumia
- Luigi Lusi
- Marina Magistrelli
- Pietro Marcenaro
- Andrea Marcucci
- Francesca Maria Marinaro
- Franco Marini
- Ignazio Marino
- Mauro Maria Marino
- Alberto Maritati
- Daniela Mazzuconi
- Vidmer Mercatali
- Claudio Micheloni
- Riccardo Milana
- Claudio Molinari
- Colomba Mongiello
- Enrico Morando
- Fabrizio Morri
- Adriano Musi
- Magda Negri
- Paolo Nerozzi
- Antonino Papania
- Achille Passoni
- Carlo Pegorer
- Marco Perduca
- Flavio Pertoldi
- Leana Pignedoli
- Roberta Pinotti
- Donatella Poretti
- Giovanni Procacci
- Nino Randazzo
- Raffaele Ranucci
- Giorgio Roilo
- Nicola Rossi
- Paolo Rossi
- Antonio Rusconi
- Francesco Rutelli
- Gian Carlo Sangalli
- Francesco Sanna
- Luciana Sbarbati
- Gian Piero Scanu
- Anna Maria Serafini
- Achille Serra
- Silvio Sircana
- Albertina Soliani
- Marco Stradiotto
- Salvatore Tomaselli
- Giorgio Tonini
- Tiziano Treu
- Umberto Veronesi
- Riccardo Villari
- Luigi Vimercati
- Vincenzo Maria Vita
- Walter Vitali
- Luigi Zanda
- Sergio Zavoli

== Lega Nord ==
- Irene Aderenti
- Lorenzo Bodega
- Rossana Boldi
- Federico Bricolo
- Luciano Cagnin
- Roberto Calderoli
- Roberto Castelli
- Michelino Davico
- Sergio Divina
- Alberto Filippi
- Paolo Franco
- Massimo Garavaglia
- Giuseppe Leoni
- Angela Maraventano
- Rosi Mauro
- Sandro Mazzatorta
- Enrico Montani
- Cesarino Monti
- Roberto Mura
- Mario Pittoni
- Fabio Rizzi
- Piergiorgio Stiffoni
- Giovanni Torri
- Gianvittore Vaccari
- Gianpaolo Vallardi
- Armando Valli

== Italy of Values ==
- Giuseppe Astore
- Felice Belisario
- Patrizia Bugnano
- Giuseppe Caforio
- Giuliana Carlino
- Gianpiero De Toni
- Aniello Di Nardo
- Fabio Giambrone
- Elio Lannutti
- Luigi Li Gotti
- Alfonso Mascitelli
- Francesco Pardi
- Stefano Pedica
- Giacinto Russo

== UDC, STTP and Autonomous ==
- Giulio Andreotti (L)
- Antonello Antinoro
- Emilio Colombo (L)
- Francesco Cossiga (L)
- Salvatore Cuffaro
- Giampiero D'Alia
- Antonio Fosson
- Mirella Giai
- Oskar Peterlini
- Manfred Pinzger
- Helga Thaler Ausserhofer

== Mixed group ==
=== Movement for the Autonomy ===
- Vincenzo Oliva
- Giovanni Pistorio

=== Independents ===
- Carlo Azeglio Ciampi (L)
- Rita Levi-Montalcini (L)
- Sergio Pininfarina (L)
- Oscar Luigi Scalfaro (L)
- Mario Monti (L)
