= List of members of the Senate of Italy, 2006–2008 =

This is a list of the 322 members of the 15th legislature of the Italian Senate that were elected in the 2006 general election. The legislature met from 28 April 2006 to 28 April 2008.

Senators for life are marked with a "(L)".

== Democrats of the Left ==
- Silvana Amati
- Gavino Angius
- Roberto Barbieri
- Giuliano Barbolini
- Fiorenza Bassoli
- Giovanni Battaglia
- Giovanni Bellini
- Giorgio Benvenuto
- Goffredo Maria Bettini
- Paolo Bodini
- Massimo Brutti
- Paolo Brutti
- Filippo Bubbico
- Antonello Cabras
- Guido Calvi
- Anna Maria Carloni
- Felice Casson
- Furio Colombo
- Gerardo D'Ambrosio
- Andrea Carmine De Simone
- Piero Di Siena
- Federico Enriques
- Marco Filippi
- Anna Finocchiaro
- Carlo Fontana
- Vittoria Franco
- Guido Galardi
- Costantino Garraffa
- Mario Gasbarri
- Nuccio Iovene
- Nicola La Torre
- Giovanni Legnini
- Massimo Livi Bacci
- Luigi Lusi
- Andrea Manzella
- Ignazio Roberto Maria Marino
- Alberto Maritati
- Augusto Massa
- Graziano Giorgio Mazzarello
- Giorgio Mele
- Vidmer Mercatali
- Claudio Micheloni
- Colomba Mongiello
- Accursio Montalbano
- Esterino Montino
- Enrico Morando
- Giorgio Napolitano (later elected as President of Italy) (L)
- Magda Negri
- Gianni Nieddu
- Carlo Pegorer
- Leana Pignedoli
- Silvana Pisa
- Andrea Ranieri
- Giorgio Roilo
- Edo Ronchi
- Sabina Rossa
- Cesare Salvi
- Lido Scarpetti
- Anna Maria Serafini
- Giorgio Tonini
- Livia Turco
- Rosa Maria Villecco Calipari
- Massimo Villone
- Walter Vitali
- Sergio Zavoli

== Democracy is Freedom - The Daisy ==
- Benedetto Adragna
- Emanuela Baio Dossi
- Egidio Banti
- Enzo Bianco
- Paola Binetti
- Luigi Bobba
- Antonio Boccia
- Willer Bordon
- Daniele Bosone
- Franco Bruno
- Natale D'Amico
- Franco Danieli
- Lamberto Dini
- Bartolo Fazio
- Francesco Ferrante
- Domenico Fisichella
- Beatrice Maria Magnolfi
- Paolo Giaretta
- Salvatore Ladu
- Antonio Maccanico
- Marina Magistrelli
- Nicola Mancino
- Roberto Manzione
- Franco Marini
- Claudio Molinari
- Gianfranco Morgando
- Antonino Papania
- Giorgio Pasetto
- Roberto Pinza
- Antonio Polito
- Edoardo Pollastri
- Giovanni Procacci
- Nino Randazzo
- Paolo Rossi
- Simonetta Rubinato
- Giuseppe Scalera
- Giannicola Sinisi
- Albertina Soliani
- Tiziano Treu
- Renato Guerino Turano
- Gianni Vernetti
- Luigi Zanda
- Valerio Zanone

== Forza Italia ==
- Maria Elisabetta Alberti Casellati
- Paolo Amato
- Roberto Antonione
- Franco Asciutti
- Antonio Azzollini
- Massimo Baldini
- Vincenzo Barba
- Paolo Barelli
- Giampaolo Bettamio
- Laura Bianconi
- Alfredo Biondi
- Anna Cinzia Bonfrisco
- Maria Burani Procaccini
- Giulio Camber
- Gianpiero Carlo Cantoni
- Valerio Carrara
- Francesco Casoli
- Roberto Centaro
- Angelo Maria Cicolani
- Ombretta Colli
- Romano Comincioli
- Rosario Giorgio Costa
- Antonio D'Alì
- Marcello Dell'Utri
- Claudio Fazzone
- Mario Francesco Ferrara
- Giuseppe Firrarello
- Roberto Formigoni
- Giancarlo Galan
- Antonio Gentile
- Niccolò Ghedini
- Enzo Ghigo
- Antonio Girfatti
- Pasquale Giuliano
- Luigi Grillo
- Paolo Guzzanti
- Raffaele Iannuzzi
- Angelo Michele Iorio
- Cosimo Izzo
- Antonio Lorusso
- Pietro Lunardi
- Lucio Malan
- Franco Malvano
- Ignazio Manunza
- Giulio Marini
- Piergiorgio Massidda
- Giovanni Mauro
- Carmelo Morra
- Pasquale Nessa
- Emiddio Novi
- Nitto Francesco Palma
- Andrea Pastore
- Marcello Pera
- Enrico Pianetta
- Lorenzo Piccioni
- Filippo Piccone
- Beppe Pisanu
- Giancarlo Pittelli
- Guido Possa
- Gaetano Quagliariello
- Antonella Rebuzzi
- Maurizio Sacconi
- Giacomo Santini
- Aldo Scarabosio
- Paolo Scarpa Bonazza Buora
- Renato Schifani
- Luigi Scotti
- Lucio Stanca
- Egidio Sterpa
- Giorgio Clelio Stracquadanio
- Vincenzo Taddei
- Antonio Tomassini
- Giuseppe Vegas
- Cosimo Ventucci
- Guido Viceconte
- Carlo Vizzini
- Guido Ziccone

== National Alliance ==
- Laura Allegrini
- Andrea Augello
- Alberto Balboni
- Mario Baldassarri
- Antonio Battaglia
- Filippo Berselli
- Giorgio Bornacin
- Emilio Nicola Buccico
- Alessio Butti
- Antonino Caruso
- Giovanni Collino
- Gennaro Coronella
- Cesare Cursi
- Euprepio Curto
- Marcello De Angelis
- Mariano Delogu
- Francesco Divella
- Andrea Fluttero
- Domenico Gramazio
- Stefano Losurdo
- Alfredo Mantica
- Alfredo Mantovano
- Ugo Martinat
- Altero Matteoli
- Giuseppe Menardi
- Stefano Morselli
- Franco Mugnai
- Domenico Nania
- Antonio Paravia
- Francesco Pontone
- Luigi Ramponi
- Maurizio Saia
- Learco Saporito
- Gustavo Selva
- Francesco Storace
- Nino Strano
- Oreste Tofani
- Achille Totaro
- Giuseppe Valditara
- Giuseppe Valentino
- Pasquale Viespoli

== Communist Refoundation Party ==
- Martino Albonetti
- Daniela Alfonzi
- Salvatore Allocca
- Maria Luisa Boccia
- Salvatore Bonadonna
- Lidia Brisca Menapace
- Giovanna Capelli
- Milziade Caprili
- Giovanni Confalonieri
- José Luiz Del Roio
- Giuseppe Di Lello Finuoli
- Erminia Emprin
- Rina Gagliardi
- Fosco Giannini
- Claudio Grassi
- Santo Liotta
- Luigi Malabarba
- Francesco Martone
- Maria Celeste Nardini
- Anna Maria Palermo
- Giovanni Russo Spena
- Tommaso Sodano
- Raffaele Tecce
- Franco Turigliatto
- Tiziana Valpiana
- Olimpia Vano
- Stefano Zuccherini

== Union of Christian and Centre Democrats ==
- Mario Baccini
- Rocco Buttiglione
- Amedeo Ciccanti
- Salvatore Cuffaro
- Antonio De Poli
- Francesco D'Onofrio
- Maurizio Eufemi
- Massimo Fantola
- Marco Follini
- Michele Forte
- Mauro Libè
- Graziano Maffioli
- Luigi Maninetti
- Calogero Mannino
- Luca Marconi
- Sandra Monacelli
- Giuseppe Naro
- Nedo Lorenzo Poli
- Salvatore Ruggeri
- Gino Trematerra
- Tomaso Zanoletti

== Lega Nord ==
- Roberto Calderoli
- Roberto Castelli
- Michelino Davico
- Sergio Divina
- Paolo Franco
- Dario Fruscio
- Albertino Gabana
- Dario Galli
- Giuseppe Leoni
- Ettore Pirovano
- Massimo Polledri
- Stefano Stefani
- Piergiorgio Stiffoni

== Together with the Union ==
=== Federation of the Greens ===
- Mauro Bulgarelli
- Loredana De Petris
- Anna Donati
- Marco Pecoraro Scanio
- Natale Ripamonti
- Gianpaolo Silvestri

=== Party of Italian Communists ===
- Armando Cossutta
- Manuela Palermi
- Maria Agostina Pellegatta
- Fernando Rossi
- Dino Tibaldi

== Mixed group ==
=== Italy of Values ===
- Aniello Formisano
- Fabio Giambrone
- Giuseppe Caforio
- Sergio De Gregorio
- Franca Rame

=== Union of Democrats for Europe ===
- Stefano Cusumano
- Tommaso Barbato
- Clemente Mastella

=== Southern Democratic Party ===
- Pietro Fuda

=== Per le Autonomie ===
==== South Tyrolean People's Party ====
- Oskar Peterlini
- Manfred Pinzger
- Helga Thaler Ausserhofer

==== Autonomy Liberty Democracy ====
- Carlo Perrin

=== Christian Democracy for Autonomies ===
- Mauro Cutrufo
- Gianfranco Rotondi

=== Movement for the Autonomy ===
- Giovanni Pistorio
- Giuseppe Saro

=== Independents ===
- Luigi Pallaro
- Carlo Azeglio Ciampi (L)
- Francesco Cossiga (L)
- Oscar Luigi Scalfaro (L)
- Giulio Andreotti (L)
- Rita Levi Montalcini (L)
- Emilio Colombo (L)
- Sergio Pininfarina (L)
