= 2008 Italian general election in Piedmont =

The 2008 Italian general election took place on 13–14 April 2008. In Piedmont, in line with its regional status of being among the Italian regions closest to the national vote, the election was won by the centre-right coalition bed by Silvio Berlusconi between The People of Freedom and Lega Nord, as it happened at the national level, resulting in the election of Berlusconi and the fourth Berlusconi government. In the Chamber of Deputies, The People of Freedom was the largest party in the election with 34.3%, ahead of the Democratic Party (32.4%) and the centre-left coalition led by Walter Veltroni, and Lega Nord (12.6%).

== Results ==
=== Chamber of Deputies ===
Coalition leader	votes	votes (%)	seats	Party	votes	votes (%)	seats
Silvio Berlusconi	1,278,830	46.8	27	The People of Freedom	935,890	34.3	19
Silvio Berlusconi	1,278,830	46.8	27	Lega Nord	342,940	12.6	8
Walter Veltroni	1,021,623	37.4	18	Democratic Party	885,549	32.4	15
Walter Veltroni	1,021,623	37.4	18	Italy of Values	136,074	5.0	3
Pier Ferdinando Casini	141,335	5.2	2	Union of the Centre	143,335	5.2	2
Fausto Bertinotti	92,699	3.4	-	The Left – The Rainbow	92,699	3.4	-
Daniela Santanchè	86,885	3.2	-	The Right	86,885	3.2	-
Marco Ferrando	18,491	0.7	-	Workers' Communist Party	18,491	0.7	-
Enrico Boselli	18,101	0.7	-	Socialist Party	18,101	0.7	-
Flavia D'Angeli	14,989	0.5	-	Critical Left	14,989	0.5	-
Others	45,334	1.9	-	others	45,334	1.9	-
Total coalitions	2,730,221	100.0	47	Total parties	2,730,221	100.0	47

Source: Ministry of the Interior

=== Senate ===
Coalition leader	votes	votes (%)	seats	Party	votes	votes (%)	seats
Silvio Berlusconi	1,204,737	47.5	13	The People of Freedom	892,479	35.2	10
Silvio Berlusconi	1,204,737	47.5	13	Lega Nord	312,258	12.3	3
Walter Veltroni	967,805	38.2	9	Democratic Party	841,666	33.2	8
Walter Veltroni	967,805	38.2	9	Italy of Values	126,139	5.0	1
Pier Ferdinando Casini	134,221	5.3	-	Union of the Centre	134,221	5.3	-
Fausto Bertinotti	84,235	3.3	-	The Left – The Rainbow	84,235	3.3	-
Daniela Santanchè	68,742	2.7	-	The Right	68,742	2.7	-
Marco Ferrando	16,184	0.6	-	Workers' Communist Party	16,184	0.6	-
Enrico Boselli	15,556	0.6	-	Socialist Party	15,556	0.6	-
Flavia D'Angeli	14,121	0.6	-	Critical Left	14,121	0.6	-
Others	28,693	1.1	-	others	28,693	1.1	-
Total coalitions	2,534,294	100.0	22	Total parties	2,534,294	100.0	22

Source: Ministry of the Interior

== MPs elected in Piedmont ==
=== Chamber of Deputies ===
==== Piedmont 1 (Torino) ====
===== The People of Freedom =====
- Guido Crosetto
- Margherita Boniver
- Maurizio Leo
- Osvaldo Napoli
- Maria Grazia Siliquini
- Benedetto Della Vedova
- Manuela Repetti
- Agostino Ghiglia
- Enrico Pianetta

===== Democratic Party =====
- Piero Fassino
- Antonio Boccuzzi
- Anna Rossomando
- Giorgio Merlo
- Marco Calgaro
- Gianni Vernetti
- Stefano Esposito
- Giacomo Portas
- Mimmo Lucà

===== Lega Nord =====
- Stefano Allasia
- Renato Togni
- Elena Maccanti

===== Italy of Values =====
- Giuseppe Giulietti
- Gaetano Porcino

===== Union of the Centre =====
- Michele Vietti

==== Piedmont 2 (Alessandria-Asti-Cuneo-Novara-Vercelli-Biella-Verbania) ====
===== The People of Freedom =====
- Lucio Stanca
- Marco Zacchera
- Maria Teresa Armosino
- Enrico Costa
- Alessandro Ruben
- Giuseppe Vegas
- Roberto Rosso
- Franco Stradella
- Gianni Mancuso
- Gaetano Nastri

===== Democratic Party =====
- Luigi Bobba
- Cesare Damiano
- Mario Lovelli
- Mario Barbi
- massimo Fiorio
- Elisabetta Rampi

===== Lega Nord =====
- Roberto Cota
- Gianluca Buonanno
- Roberto Simonetti
- Maria Piera Pastore
- Sebastiano Fogliato

===== Italy of Values =====
- Renato Cambursano

===== Union of the Centre =====
- Teresio Delfino

=== Senate ===
==== The People of Freedom ====
- Enzo Ghigo
- Ugo Martinat
- Aldo Scarabosio
- Lucio Malan
- Andrea Fluttero
- Valter Zanetta
- Lorenzo Piccioni
- Giuseppe Menardi
- Maria Rizzotti
- Gilberto Pichetto Fratin

==== Democratic Party ====
- Emma Bonino
- Roberto Della Seta
- Mauro Marino
- Pietro Marcenaro
- Maria Leddi
- Franca Biondelli

==== Lega Nord ====
- Michelino Davico
- Enrico Montani
- Lidia Boldi

==== Italy of Values ====
- Patrizia Bugnano
