= Ceroni =

Ceroni is an Italian surname. Notable people with the surname include:

- Giovanni Soglia Ceroni (1779–1856), Italian cardinal
- Guillermo Ceroni (born 1946), Chilean politician
- Maria Suppioti Ceroni (1730 – c. 1773), Italian pastellist
- Remigio Ceroni (born 1955), Italian politician
- Samantha Ceroni (born 1973), Italian footballer

== See also ==
- Ophisaurus ceroni, species of lizard
