= Ridolfo =

Ridolfo is a given name. Notable people with the name include:

- Ridolfo Luigi Boccherini
- Ridolfo II da Varano di Camerino (1344–1384), condottiero operating in Italy
- Ridolfo Campeggi (1565–1624), Italian nobleman, Marinist poet, librettist, and playwright
- Ridolfo Capo Ferro, Italian fencing master, author of his rapier fencing treatise published 1610
- Michele di Ridolfo del Ghirlandaio, (1503–1577), Italian painter who worked in Florence
- Ridolfo Ghirlandaio (1483–1561), Italian Renaissance painter active mainly in Florence
- Ridolfo Livi (1856–1920), Italian anthropologist
- Roberto di Ridolfo (1531–1612), Italian and Florentine nobleman and conspirator
- Ridolfo Schadow (1786–1822), German sculptor
