= Procacci =

Procacci is an Italian surname. Notable people with the surname include:

- Domenico Procacci (born 1960), Italian film producer
- Giovanni Procacci (born 1955), Italian politician
- Vincenza Procacci (born 1966), American tennis player
