= Massimo Livi Bacci =

Senator of the Italian Republic
- In office 28 April 2006 – 14 March 2013

Personal details
- Born: 9 November 1936 (age 89) Florence, Italy
- Party: Democratic Party
- Other political affiliations: Democrats of the Left

Massimo Livi Bacci (born 9 November 1936) is an Italian politician and statistician specializing in demography.

== Biography ==
=== Education ===
After classical studies, he graduated (in 1960) from the Faculty of Political Science "Istituto Cesare Alfieri" of the University of Florence, and then studied in the United States at Brown University with a Fulbright scholarship. He began his university career at the University of Rome, becoming a full professor of demography at the University of Florence in 1966, teaching at the Faculty of Economics and Commerce and that of Political Science "Cesare Alfieri". He spent long periods of study and teaching in the American continent (United States, Mexico, Brazil) and in various European countries.

=== Academic and publishing activities ===
His scientific activity has concerned various aspects of current and historical demography. A supporter of the usefulness of incursions into disciplinary fields other than the one central to his interests (demography), useful for better understanding the issues, he has particularly studied history and the interactions between demographic dynamics and social policies. He has carried out journalistic activity for some national newspapers. During his career he has published books, essays and articles and directed research groups. He has also contributed to founding scientific societies, collaborating with public and private, national and international institutions. From 1973 to 1993 he was general secretary and president of the International Union for the Scientific Study of Population (IUSSP), a scientific society of demographic studies known throughout the world, of which he later became honorary president. In this capacity he was the organizational and scientific director of the quadrennial world conferences in Mexico in 1977, Manila in 1981, Florence in 1985, New Delhi in 1989, Montreal in 1993, and he instructed the preparatory phase of the Beijing conference in 1997.

In 2007, together with other scholars, he founded the online social policy magazine Neodemos.

=== Political activity ===
In the 2006 Italian general election he was elected Senator of the Republic for the Democrats of the Left. He subsequently joined the Democratic Party, being re-elected Senator in the 2008 Italian general election. He ended his parliamentary mandate in 2013.

== Awards and recognitions ==
- Honorary degree awarded by the University of Liège
- Honorary Degree awarded by the Complutense University of Madrid
- 1985 - Academician of the Lincei
- 2001 - Invernizzi Prize for Economics
- 2001 - corresponding member of the Accademia delle Scienze di Torino (since 2005 as a non-resident National)
- 2004 - member of the American Philosophical Society
- 2006 - Premio nazionale letterario Pisa con il saggio Conquista. La distruzione degli indios americani

== Family ==
His father Livio Livi, his grandfather Ridolfo Livi, and his great-grandfather Carlo Livi were also scholars in the fields of statistics, anthropology, and psychiatry.

== Works ==
- Popolazione e alimentazione. Saggio sulla storia demografica europea - Il Mulino 1993
- La popolazione nella storia d'Europa - Il Mulino 1999
- Storia minima della popolazione del mondo - Il Mulino 2005
- Conquista. La distruzione degli indios americani - Il Mulino 2005
- Il Pianeta Stretto - Il Mulino 2015
- I traumi d'Europa. Natura e politica al tempo delle guerre mondiali - Il Mulino, 2020
- La geodemografia. Il peso dei popoli e i rapporti tra stati - Il Mulino 2024

== See also ==
- List of members of the Senate of Italy, 2006–2008
- List of members of the Senate of Italy, 2008–2013
