= Cursi (surname) =

Cursi is a surname. Notable people with the surname include:

- Cesare Cursi, Italian politician
- Scott Cursi, American bullpen catcher

== See also ==
- Cursi, Italy
- Rudo y Cursi, 2008 Mexican film
