= Davide Mengacci =

Italian television host

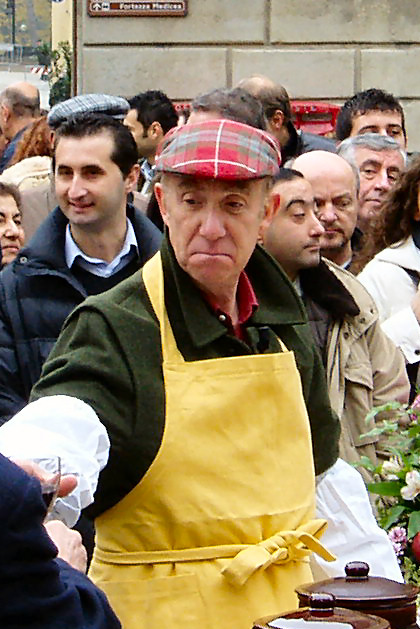
Davide Mengacci in Arezzo, 2004

Davide Mengacci (born 8 September 1948, in Milan) is an Italian television host who has been working in television since 1986. From 2000 to 2005 he worked on the show La domenica del villaggio with Mara Carfagna, who in May 2008 was appointed Minister for Equal Opportunity in the fourth cabinet of Prime Minister Silvio Berlusconi. Mengacci is also a photographer, and has written the book Viva gli Sposi ("Long Live the Newlyweds", 1992).

== Career ==
- Otto Italie allo specchio (1986)
- Pentathlon (1987)
- Questioni di stile (1988)
- Candid camera show (1988–90)
- Scene da un matrimonio (1990-6)
- Il pranzo è servito (1992-3)
- Perdonami (1993-6)
- La domenica del villaggio (1996-2005)
- Fornelli d'Italia (1999-2004)
- In cucina con Mengacci (2011)
