= Laura Allegrini =

Italian politician

- Laura Allegrini in 2008

Member of the Senate of the Republic
- In office 28 April 2006 – 14 March 2013 Serving with House of Freedoms (2006-2008)

Personal details
- Born: 23 July 1960 (age 66) Viterbo, Italy
- Party: Brothers of Italy (since 2018)
- Other political affiliations: MNS (2017-2018); AzN (2015-2017); NCD (2013-2015); PdL (2009-2013); AN (1995-2009); MSI (until 1995)
- Education: Sapienza University of Rome

Laura Allegrini (born 23 July 1960) is an Italian politician. She served as a member of the Senate of the Republic from 2006 to 2013.

== Biography ==
Allegrini lives in Gradoli (Viterbo). She graduated in Law at Sapienza University of Rome, and is an entrepreneur in the agri-food sector.

From 1995 to 2001 she was President of the municipal music school of Viterbo.

== Political activity ==
An exponent of the Italian Social Movement, in 1995 she joined Gianfranco Fini's Fiuggi turn from MSI to National Alliance (AN), where in the 1995 regional elections in Lazio she ran for the Regional Council with AN in the province of Viterbo, resulting the first of the non-elected; nevertheless she became Councillor the following year, replacing Michele Bonatesta, elected senator.

In the subsequent 2000 Lazio regional election she was re-elected as regional councillor, with almost 9,000 preferences. She was president of the permanent council commission for agriculture, hunting and fishing, agro-food production, as well as vice-president of the council commission for youth conditions, innovation and bureaucratic reform.

She also ran for re-election in the 2005 regional elections, but despite receiving almost 11,000 personal preferences, she was not re-elected, as the National Alliance seat in the province of Viterbo was not available.

Between 2005 and 2006 she was ministerial advisor to the Minister of Health Francesco Storace, during the third government led by Prime Minister Silvio Berlusconi.

In the 2006 Italian general election she was elected to the Senate of the Republic, on the National Alliance lists in the Lazio constituency.

In the 2008 Italian general election she was re-elected senator on The People of Freedom list.

She was also a candidate for the Senate in the 2013 Italian general election with the People of Freedom, but was not re-elected.

On 16 November 2013, with the suspension of the activities of the People of Freedom, she decided to join the New Centre-Right led by Angelino Alfano, a party that he left in October 2015.

In November 2015 he was among the founders of the political movement "Azione Nazionale" of Gianni Alemanno, which in February 2017 will merge together with La Destra of Francesco Storace in the Movimento Nazionale per la Sovranità.

In view of the 2018 Italian general election, in January 2018 she left the National Movement for Sovereignty to join Giorgia Meloni's Brothers of Italy, with which she was re-nominated for the Senate of the Republic in the Lazio constituency, but was not elected.

In the 2018 Italian local elections in Viterbo she was elected municipal councillor with Fratelli d'Italia; on 4 July she became assessor for public works of the municipality of Viterbo in the new government of Giovanni Arena.

== See also ==
- List of members of the Senate of Italy, 2006–2008
- List of members of the Senate of Italy, 2008–2013
