= Fiamma Nirenstein =

Italian-Israeli journalist and political figure

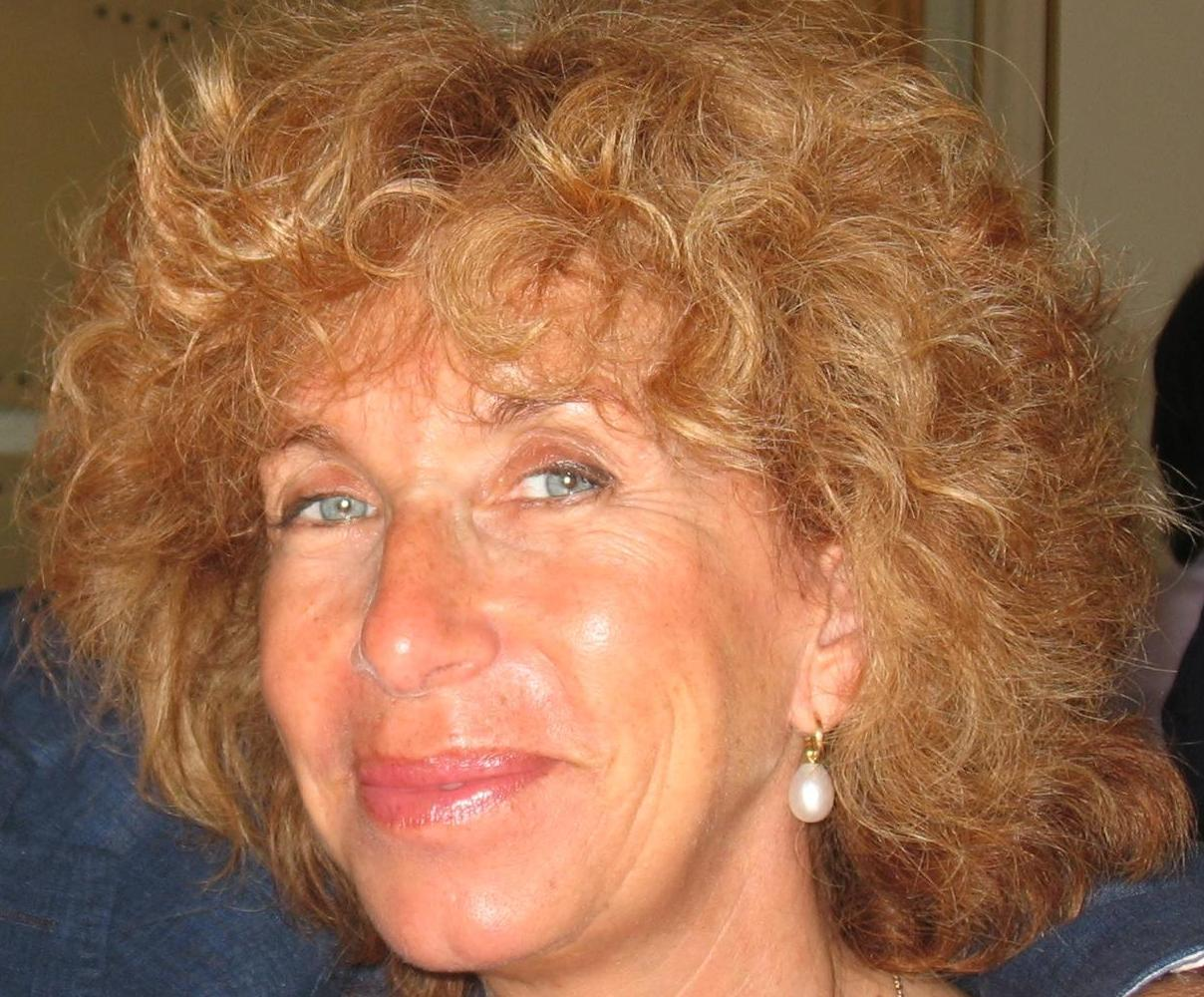
Nirenstein in 2008

Fiamma Nirenstein (Hebrew: פיאמה נירנשטיין) is an Italian-Israeli journalist, author and politician. In 2008 she was elected to the Italian Parliament for Silvio Berlusconi's The People of Freedom party and she served as Vice President of the Committee on Foreign Affairs of the Chamber of Deputies for the length of the legislature, ending in March 2013. On 26 May 2013 she made Aliyah to Israel. In 2015, Nirenstein was nominated by Israeli Prime Minister Benjamin Netanyahu as the future ambassador to Italy, but subsequently withdrew for what she stated were personal reasons. She is Senior Fellow of Jerusalem Center for Security and Foreign Affairs. She writes for the Italian daily Il Giornale and contributes articles in English to the Jerusalem News Syndicate. She is a member of the Israeli Council on Foreign Relations of the World Jewish Congress. She lives in Jerusalem.

== Background ==
Nirenstein's father, Alberto Nirenstein, came to Italy as part of the Jewish brigade. There he met his future wife journalist Wanda Lattes, who was a partisan in the resistance. Nirenstein's parents were remembered in Italy with the title of the Borgo Allegri garden in Florence which in 2019 was called "Giardino Wanda Lattes and Alberto Nirenstein". She grew up in a Florentine Jewish family. She first visited Israel in 1966, and returned as a guest at the Neot Mordechai kibbutz on the eve of the Six Day War. On her return to Italy she studied modern history before going on to work as a journalist.

== Political career ==
=== In Italy ===
Silvio Berlusconi invited Nirenstein to become a candidate for their joint list Il Partito della Libertà ("The Party of Liberty") for the April 2008 national elections. In general, through her political career, Nirenstein aimed to contribute to an anti-terrorist, pro-Israeli and Atlantic Alliance, which advocated the values of the culture of human rights.

Elected Member of the Italian Parliament, she served as Vice President of the Committee on Foreign Affairs of the Chamber of Deputies for the entire XVIth legislature, ending in March 2013. She was also a member of the Italian delegation to the Council of Europe, where she represented Italy in the Network for the fight against violence on children. Nirenstein also established and chaired the Committee for the Inquiry into Antisemitism of the Italian Parliament. During her parliamentary activity, she had a particular focus on Israel, human rights, international controversies, democratization in the Middle East and awareness of Iran's nuclear capabilities.

Among the most significant activities during her parliamentary activity there are the letter to the Ambassador of Syria in Italy, Khaddur Hasan, to stop the repression of the Assad regime, signed by 50 parliamentarians belonging to all political groups and various parliamentary questions including the question to the Foreign Affairs Committee of May 4, 2011 on the ongoing repression in Syria.

Additionally, she established and chaired the Committee for the Inquiry into Anti-Semitism and also established the Israel-Italy Inter-Parliamentary Commission.

== Professional career as journalist and writer ==
Nirenstein's work deals with the Middle East conflicts, terrorism, anti-Semitism, human rights and her activities deals with the great changes that are taking place within the Middle East democratization process. The main topic through all Fiamma Nirenstein's political activity is the fight against totalitarianism and terrorism, informed by her definition of antisemitism and hate against Israel.

=== Journalism ===
Nirenstein is a leading columnist for the conservative Italian daily il Giornale. From 1991 to 2006, she was the correspondent from Israel for La Stampa daily and the Berlusconi-owned Panorama weekly. She also wrote for the newspaper Grazia and was the founder of the monthly Rosa.

She is the author of seventeen books in Italian and thirteen in English. In Italy, Nirenstein has introduced and prefaced Bernard Lewis, Natan Sharansky and Ruthie Blum. She has been granted over twenty awards for her literary and journalistic activity.

Nirenstein started her career in 1977 and has been a columnist and correspondent for some major Italian magazines (Panorama; l'Espresso; Epoca). Nirenstein contributed to The New York Sun, to the Commentary magazine and has written for the Moment magazine.

Since 1998, she predicted the first terrorist threats in bin Laden's speeches and the suicide bombings of Islamic extremist.

Some of Nirenstein's work has been published in four American anthologies. Bernard Goldberg's book Bias (Regency Publishing, 2002, pp. 200–206) quotes her extensively for the view she writes well about the phenomenon of terrorism. A piece she wrote about suicide bombers for Commentary magazine was subsequently quoted in The Wall Street Journal the day after the 9/11 attacks to explain the mentality of terrorists.

Fiamma Nirenstein has produced many documentaries for the Italian TV.In 2006 she conceived and conducted a program on foreign affairs, Ore diciotto/Mondo, on channel RAI 2. Radio Radicale has interviewed her for its Il medio Oriente visto da Gerusalemme program.

She has interviewed Rajiv Gandhi and met Deng Xiaoping, protagonists of the anti-communist regimes revolutions of the 1980s, and in the area of the Israeli-Palestinian conflicts, Arafat, Sharon and Netanyahu.

=== Work at the Jerusalem Center for Security and Foreign Affairs ===
Fiamma Nirenstein began a working relationship with the Jerusalem Center for Security and Foreign Affairs, an Israeli-based think-tank, in the late-2000s. Nirenstein's interests largely focus on European-Israeli relations, anti-Semitism, and sociological studies of terrorism. Nirenstein served both as an editor and contributor for this publication, Lessons from Israel's Response to Terrorism. Within the publication, Nirenstein authored an article entitled "Resilience, the Israeli People's Weapon against Terror". In the essay, Nirenstein argues that Israelis have a unique culture built upon resilience which makes the country particularly strong in responding to terrorism.

In 2016, Nirenstein participated in an interview at the Jerusalem Center for Security and Foreign Affairs on the subject of European Anti-Semitism. Among the subjects discussed include the history of anti-Semitism in Europe and its contemporary manifestations, particularly in what Nirenstein terms "Israelphobia".

One of her works produced while at the Israeli think-tank was Israel is Us: A Journalist's Odyssey in Understanding the Middle East. According to the organization's website, Nirenstein confesses the publication's premise is "very simple": "Israel, contrary to commonly accepted propaganda, is a positive model, a case study for anyone who finds himself living in a democratic society that must eventually confront a defensive war- one that encompasses the entire universe of Western democracy today."

Nirenstein continues to work at the think-tank.

=== Other publications ===
Nirenstein's writings have also appeared, among other websites, on The Times of Israel, the Jewish News Syndicate, the Gatestone Institute and the Machiavelli Center for Political and Strategic Studies. Since 2007, she has also maintained her personal website on which she publishes material in English and Italian.

== Later political career ==
=== Internationally ===
On June 29, 2011, Nirenstein was unanimously elected chairperson of the International Council of Jewish Parliamentarians (ICJP), an organization that brings together Jewish legislators, parliamentarians and government ministers from around the world.

In the same year, she established a center on Foreign Policy, "SUMMIT – for the dialogue between Europe and Middle East, human rights and democracy", with which she organized tens of events and conferences.

Nirenstein is a Selection Committee Member of the Genesis Prize, a fellow of the Jerusalem Center for Security and Foreign Affairs as well as a member of the advisory board of Ngo-Monitor and a board member of the European Friends of Israel (EFI). She is also one of the six founding members of the steering committee of the Interparliamentary Coalition on Combating Antisemitism (ICCA), and in the board of the Friends of Israel Initiative, established on 2010 by former Prime Minister of Spain José María Aznar. She is also a board member of the "Talmud Project", a major initiative, sponsored by the Italian government, to translate the Babylonian Talmud into Italian.

Nirenstein has been dedicating a great effort in voicing for Muslim dissidents. In December 2007 she promoted and organized in Rome the international conference "Fighting for Democracy in the Islamic World", which was the continuation of the great Prague conference on dissidents, promoted by Natan Sharansky, Václav Havel and José María Aznar in June the same year.

=== Fight against Antisemitism and anti-Zionism ===
Fiamma Nirenstein has discussed antisemitism, anti-Zionism and the left. She has been official speaker in a variety of conferences on antisemitism, among them, the world forum of OCSE in Berlin about antisemitism, the Boston Conference on "antisemitism, the press and Europe" (2004), "Multiculturalism, the left and antisemitism" during the 2006 international symposium of the Vidal Sassoon Center (SICSA) at the Hebrew University of Jerusalem. In the 2014 SICSA international symposium, she raised the issue of fighting what she deemed to be "Israelophobia" as a means of beating contemporary antisemitism.

Nirenstein co-founded the Global Forum for Combating Antisemitism. In 2024, Israeli Foreign Minister Israel Katz appointed Nirenstein as the Foreign Ministry's Special Advisor for Combating Antisemitism.

Following the October 7 attacks, Nirenstein wrote October 7, Antisemitism and the War on the West.

Nirenstein was very close with both Bernard Lewis and Robert S. Wistrich. On Wistrich's passing she wrote an obituary for him in the Israel Journal of Foreign Affairs.

=== Political awards ===
- On 16 December 2009 Nirenstein, together with Irwin Cotler, was awarded by the Israeli Knesset for her commitment in the fight against Antisemitism.
- In April 2011, she was awarded in New York by CAMERA, together with José Maria Aznar and John Bolton, for her activity as "Friend of Israel".
- In June 2011, Nirenstein was included in the Jerusalem Post list of the 50 most influential Jews in the world], headed by Mark Zuckerberg.

== Bibliography ==
- October 7th: antisemitism and the war on the West (JCFA), 2024
- The barbarians at the gates of Israel, (JCFA), 2024
- The 10 Lies about Israel, Jerusalem Center for Security and Foreign Affairs (JCFA), 2024
- "La guerra antisemita contro l'Occidente", Giubilei Regnani, 2024
- "Le 10 bugie su Israele",Federazione Associazioni Italia-Israele, 2024
- "7 ottobre 2023. Israele brucia", Historica Edizioni, 2024
- "75 volti dello Stato Ebraico", The Jewish People Policy (Yedioth Books), 2023
- 75 Faces of the Jewish State project-The Jewish People Policy (Yedioth Books), 2023
- Jewish Lives Matter: Human Rights and Anti-Semitism, Jerusalem Center for Public Affairs, 2022
- "Jewish Lives Matter", Giuntina, 2021
- Double Message, Double Standard: Institutions Abandoning the IHRA Definition of Anti-Semitism Court Danger, Jerusalem Center for Public Affairs, 2021
- A Never-ending Struggle: Challenging Anti-Semitism and Anti-Zionism. Chapter of the Book of Israelophobia and the West: The Hijacking of Civil Discourse on Israel and How to Rescue It in Dan Diker (ed.). Jerusalem Center for Public Affairs, 2020
- The Migration Wave into Europe: An Existential Dilemma. Jerusalem Center for Public Affairs, 2019
- Mission Impossible Repairing the Ties between Europe and Israel. Jerusalem Center for Public Affairs, 2018
- In Israele (2018), Il Giornale.
- The Caliph and the Ayatollah: Our world under siege. ISGAP, 2018
- Lessons from Israel's Response to Terrorism. Jerusalem Center for Public Affairs, 2017
- Le 12 bugie su Israele, (2016) Il Giornale.
- Il Califfo e l'Ayatollah, (2015) Mondadori.
- A Gerusalemme (2012) Rizzoli. The history of Jerusalem through the eyes of twenty years of journalistic work
- Israele Siamo Noi (2007) Rizzoli. On the State of Israel as archetype for a liberal democracy at war with terror. - Translated into English: Israel is us – a personal odyssey to a journalist's understanding of the Middle East, JCPA ed., 2009
- "Israel is us – a personal odyssey to a journalist's understanding of the Middle East", JCPA ed., 2009
- La Sabbia di Gaza (2006) Rubbettino editore. On the Israeli disengagement from Gaza.
- Terror: The New Anti-Semitism and the War Against the West (2005) Smith and Kraus, Hannover, Usa. An English-language selection of various articles.
- Gli Antisemiti Progressisti (2004), Rizzoli. A look at the new anti-Semitism.
- Islam, la guerra e la speranza (2003) An interview with Bernard Lewis, Rizzoli.
- L'Abbandono, come l'Occidente ha tradito gli ebrei (2002) Rizzoli. A book that argues the West has betrayed the Jewish people.
- Un solo Dio, tre verità (2001) Mondadori .(One god, three truths) written with Giorgio Montefoschi.
- Come le cinque dita di una mano – una famiglia di ebrei da Firenze a Gerusalemme (1998), Rizzoli. Written with her family.
- Israele: una pace in guerra (1996), Il Mulino. (Israel, at peace in war)
- Il Razzista Democratico (1990), Modadori.(The Democratic racist)
