= List of presidents of the Province of Messina =

President of the Province of Messina
- Presidente della Provincia di Messina
- Inaugural holder: Paolo Spadaro
- Formation: 1889
- Final holder: Giovanni Ricevuto
- Abolished: 2013
- Superseded by: Metropolitan mayor of Messina

The president of the Province of Messina was the head of the provincial administration of Messina, a local government authority in Sicily, Italy.

The province was replaced in 2016 by the Metropolitan City of Messina.

== List ==
=== Presidents of the Provincial Deputation ===
No.	Portrait	Name	Term of office		Party
No.	Portrait	Name	Start	End	Party
1		Paolo Spadaro	1889	1892	
2		Letterio Gatto Cucinotta	1892	1899	
3		Giuseppe Orioles	1899	1904	
4		Natoli Scaglione	1905	1908	
5		Giuseppe Quattrocchi	1908	1913	
6		Sebastiano Tornatola	1913	1914	
7		Francesco Imallomeni	1914	?	

=== Presidents of the Province ===
Portrait	Name	Term of office		Party
Portrait	Name	Start	End	Party
	?	?	?	
	Giuseppe Campione	5 April 1979	10 March 1981	Christian Democracy
	?	?	?	
	Giuseppe Naro	7 October 1986	20 November 1992	Christian Democracy
	Sebastiano Coglitore	20 November 1992	25 May 1993	Christian Democracy
	Amelia Ioli Gigante	25 May 1993	22 June 1994	Christian Democracy
	Giuseppe Buzzanca	22 June 1994	25 May 1998	National Alliance
	Giuseppe Buzzanca	25 May 1998	28 May 2003	National Alliance
	Salvatore Leonardi	28 May 2003	17 June 2008	Independent (centre-right)
	Giovanni Ricevuto	17 June 2008	18 June 2013	Independent (centre-right)
	Filippo Romano (extraordinary commissioner)	18 June 2013	31 October 2014	—
	Giuseppe Petralia (extraordinary commissioner)	31 October 2014	3 December 2014	—
	Filippo Romano (extraordinary commissioner)	3 December 2014	8 April 2015	—
	Giuseppe Petralia (extraordinary commissioner)	8 April 2015	24 April 2015	—
	Filippo Romano (extraordinary commissioner)	24 April 2015	10 June 2016	—

== Sources ==
- "Storia amministrativa dell'ente". Ministero dell'Interno.
- Menichini, Piera (2005). "I presidenti delle Province dall'Unità alla Grande guerra: repertorio analitico". Storia Amministrazione Costituzione (13): 263–264.
