= Liberal Democrats (Italy) =

Liberal Democrats Liberal Democratici
- President: Italo Tanoni
- Vice President: Francesco Pifferi
- Coordinator: Alessandro Campagnioli
- Founder: Lamberto Dini
- Founded: 18 September 2007
- Split from: Democracy is Freedom – The Daisy
- Headquarters: via di Ripetta, 142; 00186 Rome
- Ideology: Liberalism
- Political position: Centre

Website
- http://www.liberal-democratici.it

The Liberal Democrats (Italian: Liberal Democratici, LD), whose complete name is Liberal Democrats for Renewal (Liberal Democratici per il Rinnovamento), is a liberal and centrist political party in Italy.

The party, whose current leader is Italo Tanoni, traces its roots in Italian Renewal, which was folded into Democracy is Freedom – The Daisy in 2002. Italian Renewal's and the Liberal Democrats' leader was Lamberto Dini, who had previously served as Director-General of the Bank of Italy (1979–1994) under Carlo Azeglio Ciampi, Minister of the Treasury (1994–1995) under Silvio Berlusconi, Prime Minister (1995–1996) and Minister of Foreign Affairs (1996–2001) under Romano Prodi, Massimo D'Alema and Giuliano Amato.

In the run-up of the foundation of the Democratic Party in 2007, Dini and his group quit and formed the Liberal Democrats, which would temporarily join The People of Freedom. In 2008 Dini stayed in that party, partying ways from his Liberal Democrats, who continued to be active as an autonomous party.

== History ==
The party was founded on 18 September 2007 as a right-wing split from Democracy is Freedom – The Daisy (DL), in opposition to the formation of the Democratic Party (PD), of which Lamberto Dini had originally been a founding member. The new party was a sort of continuation of the defunct Italian Renewal party, which had been merged into DL in 2002, but had continued to be active as liberal-centrist faction within it. The party was joined by three senators (Natale D'Amico, Giuseppe Scalera and Dini himself), a deputy (Italo Tanoni), an under-secretary (Daniela Melchiorre) and two regional councillors (Rosario Monteleone in Liguria and Antonio Verini in Abruzzo). Dini was elected party president, Tanoni coordinator and Scalera leader in the Senate, where Liberal Democrats were able to form a sub-group within the Mixed Group.

Dini announced that the party would remain in the centre-left coalition and that it would "support the Democratic Party from the outside". The party also continued to support Romano Prodi's government, but distanced from it on some issues, notably foreign policy and social security reform. One of the early goals of the LD was challenging the "statist illusion" and what they described as the hegemony of the far-left over the centre-left and the government.

On 24 January 2008 the LD, with the notable exception of D'amico and along with Clemente Mastella's Union of Democrats for Europe and Domenico Fisichella (a former leader of the conservative National Alliance who had been elected with DL in 2008), joined the opposition in voting against the government in a vote of confidence in the Senate. Consequently, Prodi resigned from Prime Minister and a snap election was called. In February the party joined The People of Freedom (PdL), the new broad centre-right party launched by Berlusconi. This led Monteleone to switch to the Union of Christian and Centre Democrats (UDC).

In the following general election, four Liberal Democrats were elected in the lists of the PdL: Dini to the Senate, Tanoni, Scalera and Melchiorre to the Chamber of Deputies. In May Dini, who was re-elected President of the Foreign Affairs Committee of the Senate, and Scalera decided to leave the LD and join the PdL. Melchiorre was thus elected party president, succeeding to Dini. In July Melchiorre and Tanoni formed a joint-group within the Mixed Group of the Chamber along with Francesco Nucara of the Italian Republican Party. Some months later, the pair started to be very critical of the Berlusconi IV Cabinet and joined the opposition in several key votes. In the 2009 European Parliament election, the party formed an alliance with the Associative Movement Italians Abroad and obtained a mere 0.2% of the vote.

In January 2010 the LD formed an electoral pact with the Union of the Centre (UdC), participating in UdC electoral lists for the 2010 regional elections. In December the party was a founding member of the centrist New Pole for Italy along with the UdC, Future and Freedom, Alliance for Italy and the Movement for the Autonomies. However, a few months later the LD returned to support Berlusconi and Melchiorre briefly served as under-secretary of Economic Development in May 2011. In October 2012 the balance of accounts of the PdL showed that the LD had received one million of Euros of financial support from Berlusconi's party, which used to finance its satellites.

In the 2013 general election the LD externally supported Mario Monti's Civic Choice and, after the election, Melchiorre returned to her job as magistrate and, having consequently resigned from party president, she was replaced by Tanoni. In the 2016 constitutional referendum the party was part of the "yes" camp, that was defeated, and the party had organised a committee to support the "yes" camp, presided by Tiziano Treu, a former minister and senator for Italian Renewal and DL.

== Leadership ==
- President: Lamberto Dini (2007–2008), Daniela Melchiorre (2008–2013), Italo Tanoni (2013–present)
  - Vice President: Francesco Pifferi (2013–present)
- Coordinator: Italo Tanoni (2007–2013), Alessandro Campagnioli (2013–present)
