= Giovanni Ricevuto =

Italian politician (born 1941)

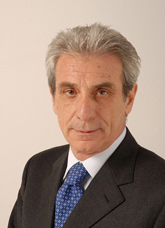

President of the Province of Messina
- In office 16 June 2008 – 20 June 2013
- Preceded by: Salvatore Leonardi
- Succeeded by: Office abolished

Undersecretary of State for Infrastructure and Transport
- In office 30 December 2004 – 23 April 2005
- Prime Minister: Silvio Berlusconi

Undersecretary of State for Education, University and Research
- In office 23 April 2005 – 23 May 2005
- Prime Minister: Silvio Berlusconi

Member of the Chamber of Deputies
- In office 28 April 2006 – 28 April 2008

Member of the Senate of the Republic
- In office 2 July 1987 – 14 April 1994

Personal details
- Born: 27 October 1941 (age 84) Salemi, Province of Trapani, Kingdom of Italy

Giovanni Ricevuto (born 27 October 1941) is an Italian politician who served as president of the Province of Messina from 2008 to 2013, Undersecretary of State, Deputy Minister, a member of the Chamber of Deputies, and a member of the Senate.
