= Donato Bruno =

Italian politician and lawyer

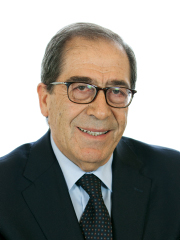

Member of the Chamber of Deputies
- In office 9 May 1996 – 15 March 2013

Member of the Senate
- In office 15 March 2013 – 17 August 2015

Personal details
- Born: 26 November 1948 Noci, Italy
- Died: 17 August 2015 (aged 66) Rome, Italy
- Cause of death: Cerebral ischemia
- Party: Forza Italia
- Occupation: Lawyer, politician

Donato Bruno (26 November 1948 – 17 August 2015) was an Italian politician.

== Biography ==
Graduated in Law, lawyer in the Supreme Court, Bruno approached Silvio Berlusconi in 1978 and has always been a close friend of Cesare Previti. In 1996 he was a candidate on the Forza Italia lists with the promise of an appointment as undersecretary in case of victory, but with the success of the center-left he became a Deputy of opposition. In 2001 he chaired the inquiry commission on the events of the G8 in Genoa. In the same year he was elected President of the Committee on Constitutional Affairs and re-elected in 2008.

He was in contention for the appointment as judge of the Constitutional Court since 2008. In July 2011, following the announcement of the resignation of the Minister of Justice Angelino Alfano, appointed secretary of the People of Freedom, Bruno was among the candidates for his succession to the post of Minister of Justice; however, the choice ultimately fell on Nitto Palma. In 2013 he was elected Senator for the PdL. After the split of NCD he became vice-group in the Senate for Forza Italia.

In 2014 his name has been among the candidates to judge of the Constitutional Court supported by center-right parties in ticket with the former magistrate and former President of the Chamber of Deputies Luciano Violante supported by the Democratic Party. However, despite Bruno has been able to gather a stronger consensus, both him and Violante didn't manage to get elected.

He died on 17 August 2015, after suffering a cerebral ischemia.
