= Machiavelli Center for Political and Strategic Studies =

Centro Studi Machiavelli
- Formation: 8 February 2017; 9 years ago
- Legal status: Think tank
- Purpose: Political activism
- Headquarters: Via Giambologna, 7; 50132 Florence
- President: Daniele Scalea

Centro Studi Politici e Strategici Machiavelli (meaning "Machiavelli Centre for Political and Strategic Studies") is a right-wing think tank based in Italy, whose mission is to promote traditional values and conservative policies.

The Machiavelli Centre publishes several articles and reports on its website, and organizes events and debates about political issues. It has been founded by League MP Guglielmo Picchi; Daniele Scalea, lecturer at Niccolo Cusano University and former advisor to Picchi when he was Deputy Minister of Foreign Affairs (2018 - 2019); and Dario Citati, at the time researcher in Political Geography at Sapienza University of Rome.

According to several media outlets, in 2018 the think tank deeply influenced the Italian government's immigration policies. In the same year, the Machiavelli Centre has been ranked among the most important right-wing think tanks in Italy, and among the four leading think tanks related to the League party.

The minister of education Giuseppe Valditara is a member of Machiavelli’s scientific committee.

The Centre has relationships also with think tanks and foundations abroad, including the International Republican Institute and The Heritage Foundation.

== Reception ==
The Center has received both praise and criticism for his activities. During Scalea's participation to the 2023 CPAC in Hungary, it has been called "The number one think tank for conservatives in Italy". While daily newspaper Il Foglio said it is "a reference point for the conservative world".

According to The Huffington Post, "The Identitarian galaxy with its idea-makers [the Machiavelli Center] outside democratic decision-making venues has influenced the decisions of our government ... An unprecedented symbolic victory ... a masterpiece of metapolitics." Communist newspaper Il Manifesto wrote that "The Machiavelli Center since the beginning of 2017 has been a real driving force behind the Lega identitarian theses ... It is the story of an influence. A soft power within the majority ... It is the new form of the deep state in the age of sovereignism."
