= Samantha Ceroni =

Italian footballer (born 1973)

Personal information
- Date of birth: 26 February 1973 (age 53)
- Place of birth: Ponte San Pietro, Italy
- Position: Midfielder

Senior career*
Years	Team	Apps	(Gls)
- Ruco Line Lazio

International career
- Italy
- * Club domestic league appearances and goals

Samantha Ceroni (born 26 February 1973 in Ponte San Pietro) is an Italian former footballer who played as a midfielder for the Italy women's national football team. She was part of the team at the UEFA Women's Euro 2001. On club level she played for Ruco Line Lazio in Italy.
