= Alessandro Ruben =

Italian politician (born 1966)

Alessandro Ruben (born 14 October 1966) is an Italian politician. He was a member of the Chamber of Deputies from 2008 to 2013.

== Early life ==
Ruben was born in Rome in 1966 to a Jewish lawyer family.

== Political career ==
He was elected as a member of The People of Freedom. In 2010, he left and joined Future and Freedom.

In 2017, he was elected a member of the National Commission of the Anti-Defamation League, the US non-governmental organization that carries out investigations and research on antisemitism and extremism.

== Personal life ==
He is engaged to cabinet minister Mara Carfagna. They have a daughter together, Vittoria, who was born in 2020.

== See also ==
- List of members of the Italian Chamber of Deputies, 2008–2013
