= Mara Carfagna =

Italian politician, former showgirl, and model

The Honorable Maria Rosaria Carfagna
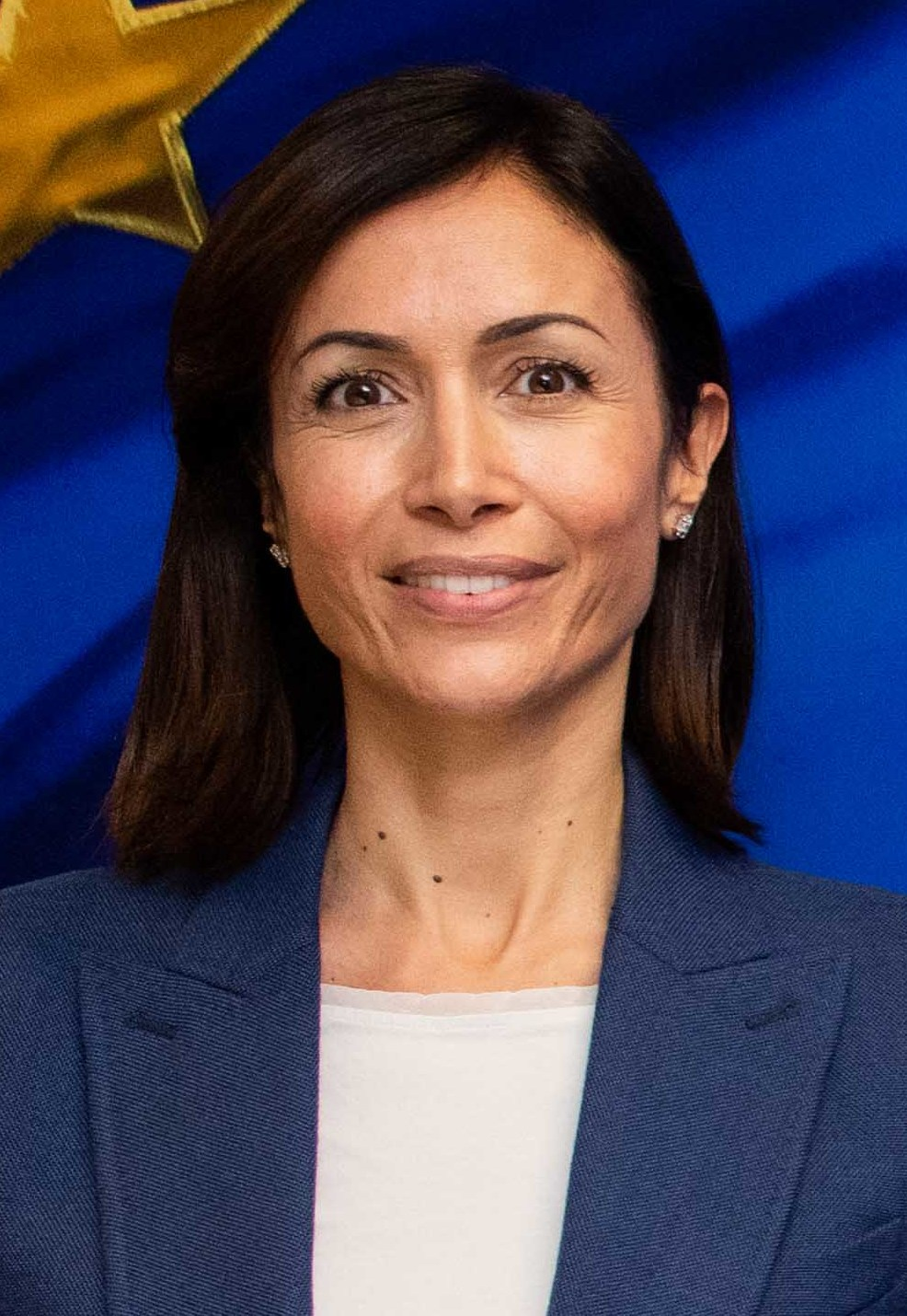

President of Action
- In office 19 November 2022 – 17 September 2024
- Preceded by: Matteo Richetti
- Succeeded by: Elena Bonetti

Minister for the South and Territorial Cohesion
- In office 13 February 2021 – 22 October 2022
- Prime Minister: Mario Draghi
- Preceded by: Peppe Provenzano
- Succeeded by: Raffaele Fitto

Minister for Equal Opportunities
- In office 8 May 2008 – 16 November 2011
- Prime Minister: Silvio Berlusconi
- Preceded by: Barbara Pollastrini
- Succeeded by: Elsa Fornero

Member of the Chamber of Deputies
- Incumbent
- Assumed office 28 April 2006
- Constituency: Campania 2

Personal details
- Born: 18 December 1975 (age 50) Salerno, Italy
- Party: Us Moderates (since 2024)
- Other political affiliations: FI (2004–2009); PdL (2009–2013); FI (2013–2022); Az (2022–2024)
- Domestic partner: Alessandro Ruben (2013–present)
- Children: Vittoria
- Education: University of Salerno

Maria Rosaria "Mara" Carfagna (born 18 December 1975) is an Italian politician and former showgirl and model. After obtaining a degree in law, Carfagna worked for several years on Italian television shows and as a model. She later entered politics and was elected to the Chamber of Deputies for Forza Italia party in 2006. From 2008 to 2011, she served as Minister for Equal Opportunity in the fourth Berlusconi cabinet. In 2018 she was elected vice president of the Chamber of Deputies. In 2021, she became the Minister for the South and territorial cohesion in the cabinet presided over by Mario Draghi.

Carfagna had been named "the most beautiful minister in the world", and was ranked number one on Maxim's "World's Hottest Politicians". She served for a time as the spokeswoman of the parliamentary group of Forza Italia at the Chamber of Deputies.

== Early life ==
Carfagna was born in Salerno, where she attended the Liceo scientifico Giovanni da Procida. In 2001 she graduated in law from the University of Salerno, with a thesis on information law and broadcasting systems.

=== Career as showgirl and model ===
After having studied dance and piano, she participated in the Miss Italy contest in 1997, finishing in sixth place. About the experience she later said: "That competition makes you as a woman, it matures you...all that stress, that desire to win, it makes you understand who you are."

Later she started working in television for the company Mediaset, controlled by the family of Silvio Berlusconi. From 2000 to 2006 she participated as a showgirl in the television program La domenica del villaggio ("Sunday in the Village") with Davide Mengacci. In 2006 she led the program Piazza grande ("Main Square") together with Giancarlo Magalli. Carfagna has also been part of the television programs I cervelloni, Vota la voce and Domenica in.

Carfagna has posed for Maxim.

== Political career ==
=== 2000s: Forza Italia and The People of Freedom ===
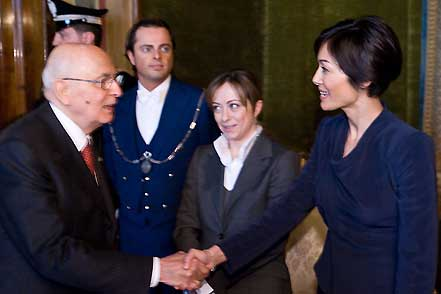
Carfagna and the Minister of Youth Policy Giorgia Meloni with the President of the Italian Republic Giorgio Napolitano in 2009

Carfagna entered politics in 2004, and became responsible for the women's movement in the political party Forza Italia. In the elections of 2006 she was elected into the Chamber of Deputies for Forza Italia, and in the 2008 elections – running as the third candidate from The People of Freedom in the district "Campania 2" – she was reelected. When she first entered parliament Berlusconi jokingly commented that Forza Italia practiced the law of primae noctis; the right of a feudal lord to take the virginity of his female subjects. As a deputy she was secretary of the Commission for Constitutional Affairs, and has been described as a diligent, hard-working parliamentarian. On 8 May 2008 she was appointed Minister for Equal Opportunity, in the fourth cabinet of Silvio Berlusconi, an appointment that was widely publicised internationally, with focus on her special background.

In September 2008, Carfagna introduced proposal for a new law making street prostitution a crime, with fines for both clients and prostitutes. The bill was her first major initiative as a minister. She said that at present in Italy, "as in the great majority of Western countries", brothels and the exploitation of prostitutes by pimps were illegal but prostitution as such was not. She described street prostitution as a "shameful phenomenon".

In 2009 she became the first political promoter of the law against stalking offence. This law was finally approved on 23 February 2009, introduced as a package of bills known as the Decreto Maroni. In the same year she signed a campaign against homophobia in Italy, with television spots, images on magazines and wall attachments on cities.

She has participated in many international conferences, met the UN Secretary General, has intervened four times to the General Assembly, where she promoted an international moratorium against FGM. She organized the first international conference on violence against women in the context of the G8, which was held in the city of L'Aquila, in Italy, in July 2009.

=== 2010s: Forza Italia revival ===
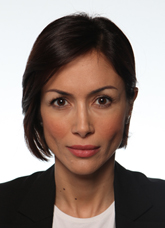
Carfagna as Member of the Chamber of Deputies in 2013

In 2010 during political debate for the International Women's Day celebration Carfagna made a political gaffe, claiming that women gained the right to vote in Italy in 1960 (while they did in 1946) and that the law that rules intrahousehold relationship was reformed in 1970 (while it was in 1975). In the 2010 Campania regional election Carfagna had a record result of 55,695 preferences. In 2011, Carfagna proposed a law, which was passed, that provided quotas for women on the boards of companies, which has allowed to involve a larger number of women in the Italian economic system. It approved funding for childcare facilities and in support of motherhood and family that made it possible to increase by a few percentage points the availability of places for working mothers. That same year Carfagna also supported a bill against homophobia, in which homophobia was considered as an aggravating circumstance in bullying events. This bill was then rejected by the People of Freedom majority in the Parliament, causing Carfagna's disappointment.

In 2013, Silvio Berlusconi founded Forza Italia, an ideological revival of the eponymous party that existed in the 1994–2009 period. Carfagna joined the party, following Berlusconi. In the same year she began a relationship with ex–deputy Alessandro Ruben. In the 2016 Italian local elections, Carfagna was the most voted Forza Italia candidate in Naples, with more than 5,500 personal preferences.

In November 2018, on the occasion of the International Day for the Elimination of Violence against Women, Carfagna launched a campaign called "Non è normale che sia normale" ("It's not normal that it's normal") involving many parliamentarians of all political parties, VIPs and personalities of sport and entertainment.

In August 2019, the Codice Rosso ("Red Code") legislation, proposed by Carfagna, enters into force in Italy to combat violence against women with more efficient investigations and more severe penalties.

On 13 February 2021, Carfagna returned to a ministerial role in the cabinet of Mario Draghi, as Minister for the South.

== Political views and controversies ==
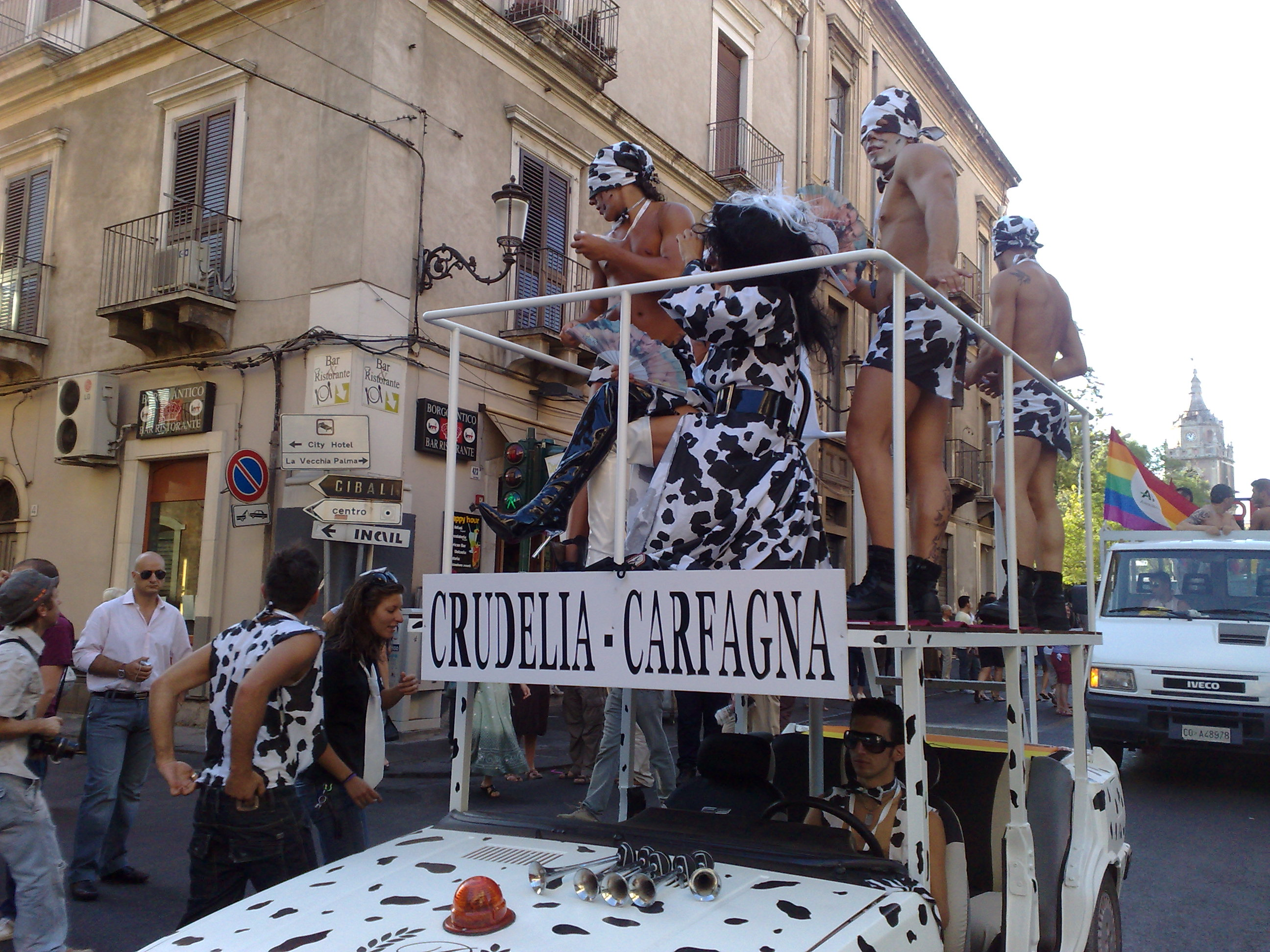
Gay pride protest against Carfagna in Catania, 2008.

Carfagna has been vocal on certain issues, such as the level of crime in her home town of Salerno, after having herself been the victim of burglary on three occasions.

In 2007 Carfagna opposed gay marriage, and said that matrimonial rights should be tied to reproduction. In May 2008 she refused to back a gay pride march, arguing that discrimination was no longer a problem for homosexuals in Italy because homophobia was just a thinking offence, a statement that was strongly criticized by gay rights groups. In May 2010, during the Quirinal Palace ceremony on the occasion of International Day Against Homophobia, Transphobia and Biphobia, Carfagna publicly apologized for the statements she made two years earlier, saying "she was helped in breaking through the wall of mistrust of which she was at the same time victim and unconscious responsible".

In January 2007, Carfagna was at the center of a controversy that received international attention. On the evening of the Telegatto award show, Berlusconi said about Carfagna: "If I was not already married I would have married her immediately". The comment caused Berlusconi's wife, Veronica Lario, to demand an apology through a national newspaper, something which she also received. Carfagna herself has later described the comment as "gallant and harmless," and said that she did not quite understand Lario's reaction.

On 2 July 2008 the Italian newspaper la Repubblica interviewed the former vice-minister of Foreign Affairs in the Berlusconi II Cabinet and socialist executive Margherita Boniver, who admitted the existence of some compromising private phone calls about Berlusconi. Few days later, the Argentine journal Clarín reported about telephone wiretap records authorized for an anti-corruption investigation. Reporter Julio Algañaraz wrote that Carfagna and Silvio Berlusconi engaged in a telephone conversation with explicit sexual allusions and regarding a meeting about sexual services.

In November 2008 Italian journalist Paolo Guzzanti wrote on his blog about Carfagna, saying: "Is it admissible or ineligible, in a hypothetical democracy, that the head of a government nominate a minister who has the one and only merit of having him personally served, excited and satisfied?", thus highlighting the words spoken by his daughter Sabina Guzzanti at "No Cav Day" anti-Berlusconi protest movement in July 2008. Carfagna sued la Repubblica for having reported Sabina Guzzanti's words that alluded to her sexual activity with Berlusconi.

In October 2012 the "Civil Court of Rome" condemned Sabina Guzzanti to compensation of €40,000 to Carfagna.

On 25 June 2020, Carfagna, as vice president of the Chamber of Deputies, ordered the forced expulsion of Vittorio Sgarbi who, pronouncing himself on the decree amending the law containing urgent measures concerning criminally relevant wiretapping, pronounced the following: "If a criminal commits a crime is normal, but if a Judge does it, it's an institutional earthquake. After the declarations without precedents against you coming from a Judge of Superior Council, after the unprecedented statements of Palamara against Mr. Salvini, we must open a commission of inquiry against the crime of magistrates who do the opposite of their work, worse than criminals".

== Personal life ==
She has been engaged since 2013 with Alessandro Ruben, a former deputy of Future and Freedom. On 26 October 2020, their daughter, Vittoria, was born.
