= Francesco Paolo Lucchese =

Italian politician (1935–2025)

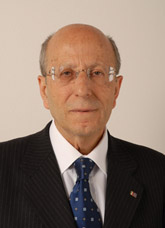
- Lucchese in 2006

Member of the Chamber of Deputies of Italy for Sicily 1
- In office 15 April 1994 – 14 March 2013

Personal details
- Born: 2 January 1935; Alcamo, Italy
- Died: 22 January 2025 (aged 90); Alcamo, Italy
- Political party: CCD; UdC
- Occupation: Pediatrician

Francesco Paolo Lucchese (2 January 1935 – 22 January 2025) was an Italian politician. A member of the Christian Democratic Centre and the Union of the Centre, he served in the Chamber of Deputies from 1994 to 2013.

Lucchese died in Alcamo on 22 January 2025, at the age of 90.
