= Barbara Mannucci =

Italian politician

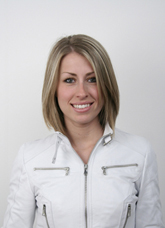

Personal details
- Born: January 15, 1982 (age 43); Rome, Italy
- Political party: The People of Freedom
- Occupation: Politician, wedding planner
- Website: nuovo.camera.it

Barbara Mannucci (born 15 January 1982, Rome) is an Italian politician.

== Biography ==
She is the daughter of Corrado Mannucci, a unionist with the UGL and former general secretary of CISNAL and the secretary of the political mission Pino Romualdi.

In January 2007, while serving as a parliamentary assistant, she founded and chaired the Rome EUR club affiliated with the good governance network of Marcello Dell'Utri, which selected her to be a parliamentary candidate the following year. At the age of 26, during the 2008 general elections she was elected to the XVI Legislature of Italy in the Puglia constituency for The People of Freedom, serving until 2013.

In June 2009, she was a candidate for the 2009 European Parliament elections with the PdL in the Central Italy constituency, but received 6,309 votes and was not elected.

In December 2014, she joined We with Salvini, the southern and central Italy branch of Lega Nord, becoming the national coordinator for women. She supported the party's hardline positions on immigration, proposing in January 2016 mandatory and preventive chemical castration for any repeat offender of rape entering Italy.
