= Italo Tanoni =

Italian politician

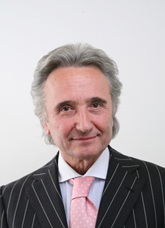

Member of the Chamber of Deputies
- In office 30 May 2001 – 14 March 2013

Personal details
- Born: 9 August 1944 (age 81) Recanati, Italy
- Party: DC (until 1994); RI (1996–2002); DL (2002–2007); LD (2007–present)
- Profession: Politician

Italo Tanoni (born 9 August 1944 in Recanati) is an Italian politician.

== Biography ==
Italo Tanoni has been the head of the particular secretariate of the Christian Democratic Undersecretary and Minister Franco Foschi. In 1996 he joined the Italian Renewal party of Lamberto Dini, becoming its Secretary and subsequently Legal Representative. Subsequently, in 2001, with the adhesion of Italian Renewal to The Daisy, he became a member of its National Directorate and Federal treasury committee.

In 2001 Tanoni was elected MP for the first time; he was re-elected in 2006 among the ranks of The Olive Tree.

In October 2007 he was among the loyalists of Lamberto Dini who did not join the Democratic Party and participated in the foundation of the Liberal Democrats for Renewal, of which he was National Coordinator and Legal Representative. In the 2008 political elections he was re-elected MP among the ranks of The People of Freedom of Silvio Berlusconi, but in November of the same year he passed to the opposition of the Berlusconi government along with Daniela Melchiorre.

In 2013 he was appointed President of the Liberal Democrats.
