= Daniela Melchiorre =

Italian politician (born 1970)

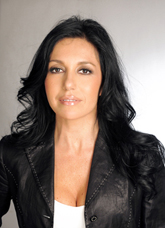

Member of the Chamber of Deputies
- In office 29 April 2008 – 14 March 2013

Personal details
- Born: 12 May 1970 (age 56) Rome, Italy
- Party: DL (until 2007); LD (2007–2013)
- Education: University of Bari
- Profession: Magistrate, politician

Daniela Melchiorre (born 12 May 1970 in Rome) is an Italian magistrate and politician.

== Biography ==
Daughter of a general of the Guardia di Finanza, Daniela Melchiorre is married and mother of a daughter. She obtained the classical maturity at the Istituto Di Cagno Abbrescia of the Jesuit Fathers and graduated with honors in jurisprudence in Bari.

In 1998 he joined the military judiciary, working as Deputy Military Prosecutor of the Republic in Verona and later in Turin.

On 18 May 2006 she was appointed Undersecretary of State for Justice in the Prodi II Government.

In 2008 she was elected MP among the ranks of The People of Freedom, as member of the Liberal Democrats of Lamberto Dini. On 5 June 2008 she was appointed President of the Liberal Democrats and on 19 November of the same year she passed to the opposition of the Berlusconi IV Cabinet.

On 5 April 2011, the Chamber of Deputies asked to raise a conflict of attribution on the proceeding against the Prime Minister Silvio Berlusconi, concerning the crimes of extortion and child prostitution in the Rubygate investigation. The two liberal democratic exponents, Daniela Melchiorre and Italo Tanoni, together with Aurelio Misiti, vote together with the majority decreeing the exit of LD from the opposition.

On 5 May 2011, she was appointed Undersecretary of State for Economic Development in the Berlusconi government but, only 23 days later, she resigned, stressing that she had never taken office.

On 30 May 2013 she returned to the military magistracy, as a judge of the Military Court of Rome.
