= Marco Causi =

Italian politician (1956–2025)

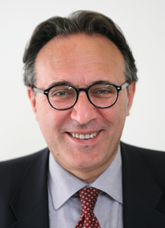
- Causi in 2008

Member of the Chamber of Deputies of Italy
- In office 29 April 2008 – 22 March 2018
- Constituency: Sicily 2 (2008–2013); Sicily 1 (2013–2018)

Personal details
- Born: 15 October 1956 Palermo, Italy
- Died: 8 May 2025 (aged 68) Rome, Italy
- Political party: PD
- Education: Sapienza University of Rome; Roma Tre University
- Occupation: Economist

Marco Causi (15 October 1956 – 8 May 2025) was an Italian politician and a member of the Democratic Party. He served in the Chamber of Deputies from 2008 to 2018.

Causi died in Rome on 8 May 2025, at the age of 68.
