= Francesco Verducci =

Italian politician (born 1972)

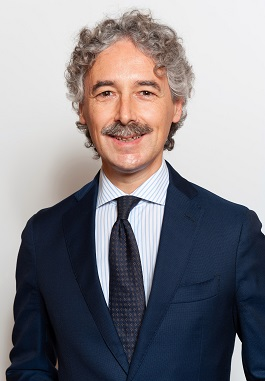
- Verducci in 2022

Member of the Senate
- Incumbent
- Assumed office 15 March 2013
- Constituency: Marche (2013–2022); Piedmont (2022–present)

Member of the Chamber of Deputies
- In office 8 October 2012 – 14 March 2013
- Preceded by: Massimo Vannucci
- Constituency: Marche

Personal details
- Born: 5 October 1972 (age 53)
- Party: Democratic Party (since 2007)

Francesco Verducci (born 5 October 1972) is an Italian politician serving as a member of the Senate since 2013.

== Political career ==
From 2012 to 2013, Verducci was a member of the Chamber of Deputies.

In addition to his role in the Senate, Verducci has been serving as a member of the Italian delegation to the Parliamentary Assembly of the Council of Europe since 2023. He is currently a member of the Committee on Equality and Non-Discrimination (since 2023) and its Sub-Committee on the Rights of Minorities (since 2023). Since 2024, he has been serving as the Assembly's General Rapporteur on combating racism and intolerance.
