= Ridolfo Livi =

Italian anthropologist (1856–1920)

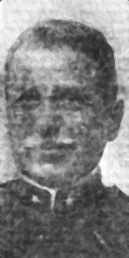
- Born: 13 July 1856; Prato, Italy
- Died: 12 April 1920 (aged 63); Florence, Italy
- Education: University of Pavia
- Occupation: anthropologist
- Relatives: Massimo Livi Bacci (grandson)

Ridolfo Livi (13 July 1856, in Prato – 12 April 1920, in Florence) was an Italian anthropologist.

He graduated in medicine at University of Pavia. He enlisted in the royal army and became a major general in 1917 three years before his death.

In 1888 he was entrusted with a vast anthropological investigation to be the carried out on approximately 300,000 military classes of 1859 and 1863. He concluded his work in 'Antropometria Militare', which consisted of two volumes, the first in 1896 and second in 1905.
