= Alfonso Papa =

Italian politician

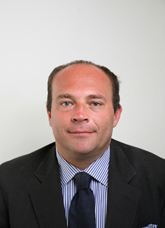
- Portrait of Alfonso Papa

Italian Republic Deputy from Campania
- In office 12 December 2008 – March 2013
- Constituency: Campania II

Personal details
- Born: 2 January 1970 (age 56) Naples, Italy
- Party: Il Popolo della Libertà
- Spouse: Ms. Tiziana Rodà
- Children: 2
- Education: University of Naples Federico II
- Profession: Judge, Law scholar

Alfonso Papa (born 2 January 1970) is an Italian former judge, university professor and member of the Italian Parliament.

== Education, professor and judicial career ==
Papa graduated cum laude at the University of Naples Federico II in 1990 with a thesis on trade law.

In 1991, Mr. Papa was an assistant for Professor Gianfranco Campobasso and Professor Carlo Di Nanni. He taught as a professor of Criminal Law at the L.U.M. University in Bari and as a professor of “The History of Criminal Organizations” at the Universitarian Institute “Suor Orsola Benincasa” in Naples.

In 1993 Papa started his eight-year judiciary career as a judicial prosecutor being first assigned in Naples where he worked on cases related to drugs, terrorism, organized crime and public administration. In Rome, Papa covered the position of Deputy Chief of Cabinet for the Minister of Justice Roberto Castelli and subsequently General Director of Civil Justice with Minister of Justice Clemente Mastella. Papa was very active in the Italian National Association of Judges, becoming a member and serving as Vice Secretary General from 1999 to 2001. Papa, who was 23 years old in 1993, is still the youngest-ever holder of an Italian judgeship.

== International work ==
During his career, Papa has worked on behalf of the Italian government for the achievement of multilateral agreement inside the United Nations, the European Commission and the Organization for Security and Co-operation in Europe (OCSE).

From 2001 to 2007 he was Head of the Italian delegation for both the UN Convention against corruption signed at Mérida, Mexico and the Working Group on Bribery at OCSE. Papa also served as an Italian representative to the Multi-Disciplinary Group of the European Commission in Brussels, the Central European Initiative (CEI) in Trieste, the High Commissioner of the Balkan Stability Pact in Sarajevo, and the Data Joint Supervisory Group of EuroJast in The Hague.

== Member of the Italian Parliament ==
Papa was elected as a Member of the Chamber of Deputies in the Italian Parliament in 2008. He was a member of several parliamentary committees: Justice and Simplification of the Public Administration. He was also chosen to sit on a committee that investigated organized crime. During his committee work, he proposed several bills in the penal justice field. As a member of the Justice Committee, Papa sponsored a number of provisions including the establishment of auditors in remote locations and the “empty-prisons” bill. Papa was also a member of the Committee of Transportation and Telecommunications, with a focus on the shipping industry.

== P4 investigation ==
In June 2011, Papa was implicated by the head prosecutor of Naples in an investigation on the so-called association P4. The Plenary Summit of the House of Deputies authorized his arrest on 20 July 2011 by secret ballot with 319 votes in favor and 293 against. Papa surrendered voluntarily to the police and was sent to the Poggioreale prison in Naples. On 31 October 2011, after 101 days in jail, the Court of Naples revoked his prison confinement and gave Papa house arrest stating that there was "no real danger of suppression of evidence." On 7 November 2011 the Supreme Court struck down the order to arrest Papa declaring a lack of grounds for keeping him in confinement and the charges against him were dropped.

On 13 April 2012 the Court of Appellate Review confirmed the decision, taken by the Supreme Court on 7 November 2011, confirming the illegality of the arrest of Papa. On 16 May 2012 the plenum of the Supreme Council of Magistrates permanently dropped all charges against Papa.

== Exit from the PDL ==
On 24 January 2013 Papa officially left the PDL party.

== Commitment for Prison Reform ==
As a direct result of Papa's experience from the false charges levied against him, he has embarked on a campaign to fight for justice and prison reforms, including prison overcrowding in Italy. From time to time Papa does Italian prison inspection visits and in carrying on other initiatives aimed at raising awareness about an issue the Italian Head of State defined as "overbearing urgency".

With the support from Italy's Libertarian Party of Marco Panella, Papa has been supporting the need for amnesty because "who opposes amnesty also opposes the hope of reforming justice".

During Alfonso Papa's tenure as a member of the Italian Parliament, he proposed a bill to limit the use of pre-trial detention to violent crimes and serious social crimes, setting out a number of safeguards for detainees awaiting trial, including the separation of spaces for convicted prisoners and those who are not, the maximum duration of six months of detention without trial and the mandatory presence of a judge during interrogations.

== Founding of a new movement ==
In July 2012, immediately following his being cleared of all charges, Papa became the president of the self-funded "Amnesty Now" commission with the goal of raising public awareness for the issues of amnesty, pre-trial confinement without due process, abysmal Italian prison conditions, as well as being an activist for civil liberties in Italy.

== Conviction and exoneration ==
In December 2016, Papa was convicted of several charges including corruption and official misconduct charges. The sentence imposes a term of four years and six month.

In February 2019, Papa had the appeal judgment on the sentence of first instance. His accuser, Alfonso Gallo, was recently accused of relations with mafia associations. The prosecutor who accused Papa, Henry John Woodcock, is now accused of illegitimate conduct before the superior council of the judiciary.

Papa was acquitted of the accusations relating to the judicial case known as P4 by the second penal section of the Court of Appeal of Naples in September 2019. The former MP was previously sentenced to imprisonment in the first instance by the first criminal section of the Court of Naples for some of the alleged crimes. The latest sentence absolves Papa of all the crimes.

Italian Chamber of Deputies
Preceded by Title jointly held	Member of the Italian Chamber of Deputies; Legislatures; XVI; 2008 – March 2013
