= Guglielmo Picchi =

Italian politician

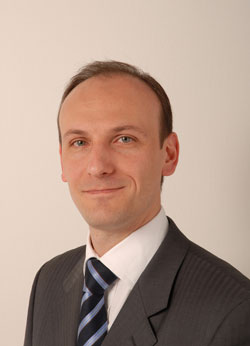

Deputy Minister of Foreign Affairs
- In office 11 June 2018 – 5 September 2019

Member of the Chamber of Deputies
- Incumbent
- Assumed office 2006

Personal details
- Born: 26 April 1973 (age 53) Florence
- Party: Lega Salvini Premier (2016–present)
- Other political affiliations: Forza Italia
- Education: University of Florence

Guglielmo Picchi (born 26 April 1973) is an Italian politician.

Picchi, a long time London resident until recently served as deputy minister of foreign affairs of Italy under the Conte I cabinet from 2018 to 2019. He is now a member of the Italian Delegation to the NATO Parliamentary Assembly and senior member of the committee on foreign affairs.

He is a member of parliament since 2006 as he was elected four times to the Camera dei deputati and has been a long serving member of the Parliamentary Assembly of the OSCE, where he was among the leadership and participated or lead some 28 Electoral Observation Missions including to the US, UK, Germany, Russian Federation, Ukraine, Belarus, Bulgaria, Turkey, Georgia, Armenia, Kirghizstan, Tajikistan, Kazakhstan, Turkmenistan, Mongolia, Tunisia.

In the OSCEPA he was also deputy chairman of the migration committee and member of the counter terrorism committee

He graduated in business at the University of Florence, was a visiting student at The University of Birmingham in 1994/1995 and with a Master of Business Administration from the SDA Bocconi Business school in Milan

He was one of the founders of the Forza Italia party in Tuscany in 1993. Since 2016, he has been a member of Lega Nord.

Picchi was elected to the City council of Florence from 1995 to 1999, but then moved to London to work for a British investment bank. In 2006, he was elected for the first time to the Italian parliament in the European overseas constituency with 5,362 preference votes. During that parliament, Picchi was a member of the foreign affairs committee.

In 2008 he was re-elected in the same constituency with 13,239 preference votes for the People of Freedom party and, from June 2008, was a member of the Italian Parliamentary delegation to the Organization for Security and Co-operation in Europe (OSCE).

Picchi successfully defended his seat for the third consecutive time at the Italian General Elections on 24 February 2013. He increased his personal preferences to 20650.

In February 2017, he was among the founding members of the Machiavelli Center for Political and Strategic Studies, a conservative think tank based in Florence.

In 2018 Picchi was elected to its fourth parliament in the constituency of Massa Lucca Pistoia Prato with Lega Salvini Premier.

From 12 June 2018 he serves as deputy minister of foreign affairs.

he is now a member of the foreign affairs committee.

Picchi currently lives in London (commuting to Italy on a weekly basis) and is also a conservative party member of the Cities of London and Westminster Conservative Association.

Both in 2008 and 2012 he supported Boris Johnson in his successful mayoral campaign in London. The Italian community in London largely voted for Johnson under the direction and efforts of Picchi, who represented that community in the Italian Parliament.
