= Claudio Fazzone =

Italian politician (born 1961)

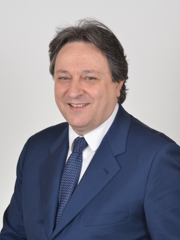
- Fazzone in 2018

Member of the Senate of the Republic
- Incumbent
- Assumed office 28 April 2006
- Constituency: Lazio (2006–2018); Lazio – 09 (2018–2022); Lazio – 06 (2022–present)

President of the Regional Council of Lazio
- In office 6 June 2000 – 18 May 2005
- Preceded by: Luca Borgomeo
- Succeeded by: Massimo Pineschi

Personal details
- Born: 7 October 1961 (age 64)
- Party: Forza Italia

Claudio Fazzone (born 7 October 1961) is an Italian politician serving as a member of the Senate since 2006. From 2000 to 2005, he served as president of the Regional Council of Lazio.
