= Angelo Maria Cicolani =

Italian politician (1952–2012)

Senator Angelo Maria Cicolani
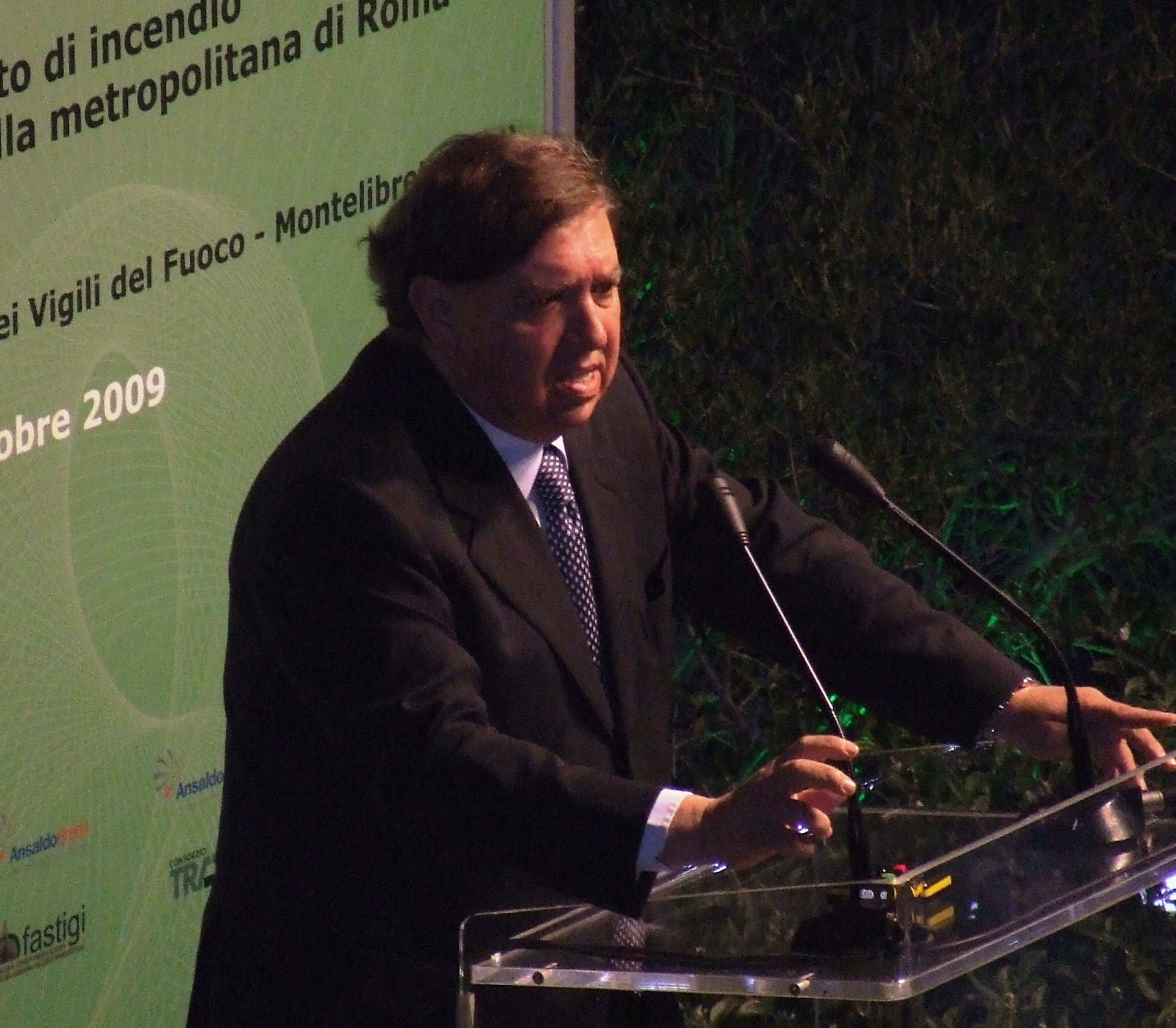
- Senator Cicolani in 2009

Member of the Italian Senate
- In office 15 May 2001 – 27 October 2012
- Constituency: Rieti

Personal details
- Born: 4 April 1952 Poggio Moiano, Rieti, Lazio, Italy
- Died: 27 October 2012 (aged 60) Rome, Italy
- Party: Forza Italia (FI), The People of Freedom (PdL)
- Profession: Engineer, politician

Angelo Maria Cicolani (4 April 1952 – 27 October 2012) was an Italian politician. He was a Member of the Italian Senate from 2001 until his death, and a Quaestor in the Senate from 2011. Cicolani died in October 2012 after a long illness. He was 60.
