= Alberto Balboni =

Italian politician (born 1959)

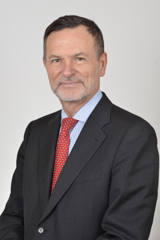
- Balboni in 2018

Member of the Senate of the Republic
- Incumbent
- Assumed office 23 March 2018
- In office 30 May 2001 – 14 March 2013

Personal details
- Born: 19 June 1959 (age 67) Ferrara, Italy
- Party: FdI (2012–present)
- Other political affiliations: MSI (until 1995); AN (1995–2009); PdL (2009–2012)

Alberto Balboni (born 19 June 1959) is an Italian politician of Brothers of Italy serving as a member of the Senate of the Republic. He was first elected in the 2001 general election, and was re-elected in 2006 and 2008. He was defeated in 2013 and was re-elected in 2018 and 2022.
