= Pietro Marcenaro =

Italian politician and trade unionist

President, Commission on Human Rights
- Incumbent
- Assumed office 29 April 2008

Member of the Italian Senate
- Incumbent
- Assumed office 28 April 2006
- Constituency: Piedmont

Personal details
- Born: 2 June 1946 (age 80) Genoa, Italy
- Party: Democratic Party
- Profession: Unionist; Politician

Pietro Marcenaro (born 2 June 1946) is an Italian politician and trade unionist of the centre-left Democratic Party. Since 29 April 2008 he has been President, Commission on Human Rights.

== Entry into politics ==
Having worked at FIAT in the years following 1975, he joined the Italian Communist Party in 1989 and was secretary of the Piedmont Division of the Italian General Confederation of Labour as well as the Federazione Impiegati Operai Metallurgici, another Italian trade union. He subsequently became regional secretary of the Democrats of the Left Party.

== Parliament ==
In 2006 he won a seat in the Italian Chamber of Deputies (the Italian lower house) as a candidate for the l'Ulivo Party, which joined other centre-left parties to form the Democratic Party. He was then elected for the XVI. legislation of the Italian Senate (the Italian upper house)starting on 29 April 2008, his party now forming part of the opposition. During this legislation, he is also part, besides the extraordinary commission for the safeguard and promotion of human rights which he presides, of the senate commission for foreign affairs. Likewise, he is member of the parliamentary delegation of Italy to the Council of Europe as well as vice-president of the parliamentary delegation to the Assembly of the Western European Union.
