= Paolo Amato =

Italian architect

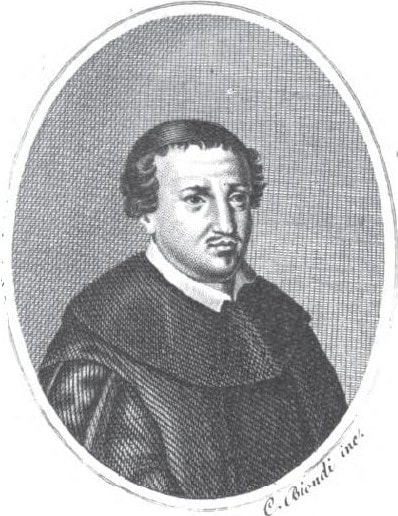

Paolo Amato (24 January 1634 – 3 July 1714) was an Italian Baroque and Rococo architect. He is also notable as author of the treatise La Nuova Pratica di Prospettiva (The New Method of Perspective), published in Palermo in 1732.

== Life ==
Born in Ciminna, where the town hall and a circle in the local piazza are both now named after him, he studied under Angelo Italia and taught Giacomo Amato. His long and fertile career included time as official architect to the Senate of Palermo on Sicily, an office in which he designed stage sets and floats for the festivities for Saint Rosalia's day. He died in Palermo and both he and his brother Vincenzo are buried in Santa Ninfa dei Crociferi church.

== Works ==
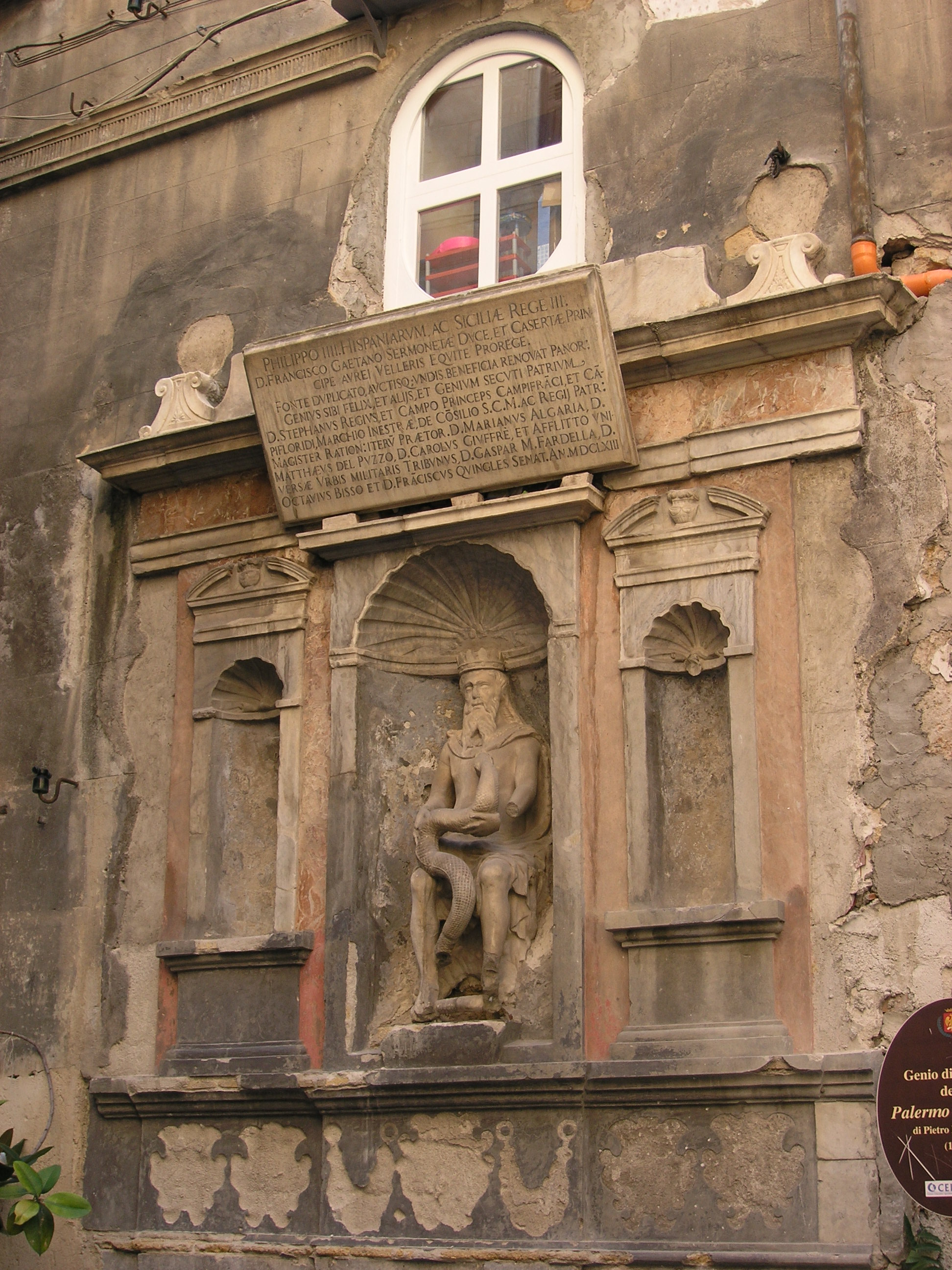
Genio di Palermo niche

His most important work design was the church of Santissimo Salvatore in Palermo, begun in 1682 on an elongated dodecagonal plan with an elliptical dome. In 1681, he designed a marble theatre for music festivals at the present Foro Italico, mainly demolished in the 19th century to make way for a theatre box designed by Carlo Giachery and Domenico Lo Faso Pietrasanta, though other parts of Amato's building were re-used in the new construction.

In 1698 he designed the marble Genio del Garraffo niche, again in Palermo, which began falling into poor condition in the second half of the 20th century.

Amato's other important works include San Giuliano church in Palermo and the monastery to which it belonged. He designed it in the second half of the 17th century and it was demolished at the end of the 19th century to make way for the Teatro Massimo. He also designed the Baroque facade for the church of San Giovanni Battista in Ciminna, the chapel of Nostra Signora della Soledad in San Demetrio church in Palermo and the Rococo funerary monuments of Giovan Battista Marassi, duke of Pietratagliata and Girolamo Marassi Drago, baron of Fontana Salsa in the Santissimo Crocifisso chapel in Santa Ninfa dei Crociferi church in Palermo.

== Modelli and drawings ==
The Galleria regionale della Sicilia di "Palazzo Abatellis" in Palermo holds two drawings by him, both dating to the late 17th century and both collaborations with Antonio Grano. One is a design in black pencil, brown ink and watercolour in brown tones for a monstrance in a Quarantore set. The other is in brown ink with traces of black pencil, watercolour in shades of gray and amaranth on fine white paper, showing a design for a sacristy cupboard for a monastery.

Designs also survive from his collaboration between Andrea Palma for stage machinery, sets and temporary architecture produced for the celebrations of the arrival and coronation of Victor Amadeus II of Sardinia and Anne Marie d'Orléans between 3 October and 24 December 1713.
