= Remigio Ceroni =

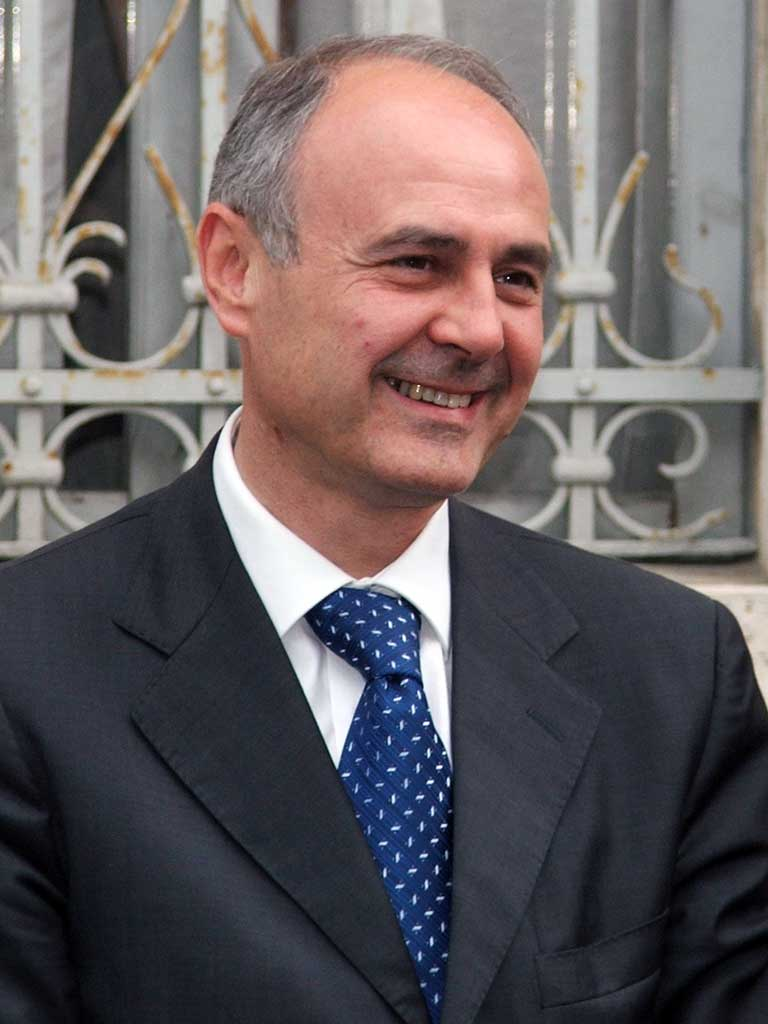

Senator of the Republic
- In office 15 March 2013 – 22 March 2018
- Constituency: XIV – Marche

Member of the Chamber of Deputies
- In office 28 April 2006 – 14 March 2013
- Constituency: XIV – Marche

Mayor of Rapagnano
- In office 2006–2021

Mayor of Rapagnano
- In office 1990–2000

Personal details
- Born: 21 April 1955 (age 71) Monterubbiano, Marche, Italy
- Party: Brothers of Italy (since 2021)
- Other political affiliations: Forza Italia (2003–2009); The People of Freedom (2009–2013); Forza Italia (2013–2018); Popular Alternative (2018–2021)
- Profession: Teacher, politician

Remigio Ceroni (born 21 April 1955) is an Italian politician, formerly a member of Forza Italia and The People of Freedom.

A member of Christian Democracy since 1972, Ceroni was elected town councillor in Rapagnano in 1985 and appointed alderman in 1988. In 1990 he became mayor of Rapagnano, being reconfirmed in 1995 and 1999; he resigned in 2000 because the office was incompatible with his election on the Forza Italia list as a regional councillor.

From 1990 to 1995 he was president of the "Tennacola" consortium for water services.

In 2003 he was appointed by Silvio Berlusconi as regional coordinator of Forza Italia for the Marche. In 2005 he was re-elected regional councillor for Forza Italia, and in 2006 he left that post after being elected to the Chamber of Deputies in constituency XIV (Marche).

In 2006, the office being compatible with that of deputy, he stood again as mayor of Rapagnano and was elected. In 2008 he was re-elected to the Chamber of Deputies in the Marche constituency on the lists of The People of Freedom, and joined the executive board of the parliamentary group as an adviser.

Following the national congress of The People of Freedom in March 2009, he was given the task of leading the party as its coordinator for the Marche.

On 15–16 May 2011 he was reconfirmed as mayor of Rapagnano for the fifth time.

In September 2011 he was rapporteur of the 2011 anti-crisis bill containing the supplementary budget (Manovra bis) that became necessary after the August stock-market crash and the rise in the spread.

At the 2013 Italian general election he was elected to the Senate.

On 16 November 2013, with the suspension of the activities of The People of Freedom, he joined Forza Italia.

On 5 June 2016 he was reconfirmed as mayor of Rapagnano for the sixth time.

On 27 January 2018 he resigned as regional coordinator of Forza Italia in the Marche following his decision not to stand at the general election of 4 March 2018.

On 4 October 2021 he was succeeded as mayor of Rapagnano by his daughter Elisabetta as he was not eligible to continue working. He was nonetheless elected town councillor.

== Parliamentary activity ==
According to the OpenParlamento website run by Openpolis, which monitors the activities of deputies and senators, as of 27 May 2011 Ceroni was the deputy with the lowest rate of absenteeism, at 0.14%: he had missed only 13 of a total of 9,105 sittings. Despite his high attendance, he had a relatively low productivity index of 163.27, ranking 204th of 630 deputies.
