= Giorgio Bornacin =

Italian politician (1949–2023)

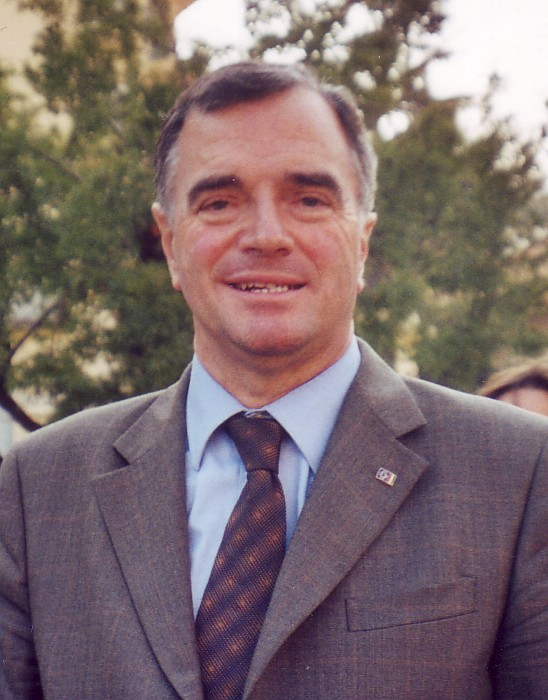
Giorgio Bornacin

Giorgio Bornacin (24 November 1949 – 17 March 2023) was an Italian politician. He was senator (1996–2001, 2006–2013) and deputy (2001–2006).

Bornacin died on 17 March 2023, at the age of 73, from COVID-19.
