= Luigi Lusi =

Italian politician

Senator
- Incumbent
- Assumed office 28 April 2006
- Constituency: Liguria

Personal details
- Born: 25 November 1961 (age 64) Rome, Italy
- Party: Democratic Party (2007–2012) The Daisy (2001–2007)
- Profession: Criminal defense lawyer

Luigi Lusi (Rome, 25 November 1961) is an Italian politician, lawyer and Senator. He was the treasurer of The Daisy from 2001 to 2007 and a member of the Democratic Party from 2007 to 2012.

== Indictment ==
On 31 January 2012 Lusi was indicted for allegedly taking the sum of €13 million owned by his former party, The Daisy, and using it for personal purposes. On 6 February 2012 he was expelled from the Democratic Party for being "incompatible with the core principles of the Party".

Party political offices
Preceded by Pierluigi Saccardi as Treasurer of the Italian People's Party	Treasurer of The Daisy; 2001–2007	Succeeded by Mauro Agostini as Treasurer of the Democratic Party
Italian Senate
Preceded by Title jointly held	Senator for Liguria since 2006; Legislatures: XV, XVI	Succeeded by Title jointly held
