= Silvana Amati =

Italian politician

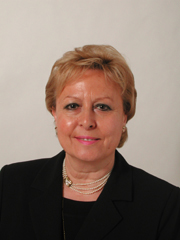

Italian Senator
- In office 2008–2018

Personal details
- Born: 31 August 1947 (age 78) Senigallia, Province of Ancona, Italy
- Party: Democratic Party
- Profession: Politician
- Website: http://www.silvanaamati.it/

Silvana Amati (born 31 August 1947) is an Italian politician from the Democratic Party. As of 2014 she serves as member of the Senate of Italy.
