= Cosimo Izzo =

Italian lawyer and politician (1943–2022)

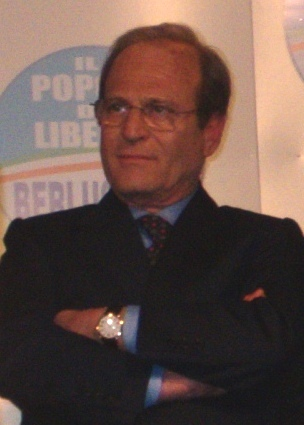
- Izzo in 2008

Member of the Senate of the Republic of Italy
- In office 30 May 2001 – 14 March 2013
- Constituency: Benevento 16

Personal details
- Born: 5 May 1943 Naples, Italy
- Died: 26 December 2022 (aged 79) Naples, Italy
- Party: FI (2000–2009); PdL (2009–2013); FI (2013–2022)
- Education: University of Naples Federico II
- Occupation: Lawyer

Cosimo Izzo (5 May 1943 – 26 December 2022) was an Italian lawyer and politician. A member of Forza Italia and The People of Freedom, he served in the Senate of the Republic from 2001 to 2013.

Izzo died in Naples on 26 December 2022, at the age of 79.
