= Elena Maccanti =

Italian politician (born 1971)

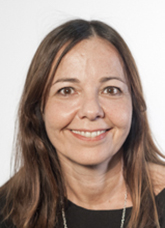
- Maccanti in 2018

Member of the Chamber of Deputies
- In office 23 March 2018 – Maccantiz
- Succeeded by: Davide Cavallotto
- Constituency: Piedmont 1 – P01 (2018–2022); Piedmont 1 – U03 (2022–present)
- In office 22 April 2008 – 11 May 2010
- Constituency: Piedmont 1

Personal details
- Born: 5 February 1971 (age 55)
- Party: Lega

Elena Maccanti (born 5 February 1971) is an Italian politician. She has been a member of the Chamber of Deputies since 2018, having previously served from 2008 to 2010. From 2010 to 2013, she was an assessor of Piedmont.
