= Maria Rizzotti =

Italian politician

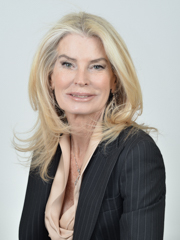
Senator Maria Rizzotti in 2018.

Maria Marietta Rizzotti (born 8 November 1953) is an Italian Senator from Forza Italia. She represents Piedmont.

== Biography ==
A plastic surgeon, she was elected to the Senate in the 2008 general election on The People of Freedom party’s ticket in the Piedmont district and was re-elected in 2013. On November 16 of that year, following the suspension of the Popolo della Libertà’s activities, she joined Forza Italia.She then began to frequent Silvio Berlusconi’s so-called “magic circle”—composed of Mariarosaria Rossi, Francesca Pascale, Deborah Bergamini, and Giovanni Toti—and accompanied them as they campaigned alongside “Il Cavaliere” in the 2015 regional elections.

In 2018, she was reelected to the Senate in the Piedmont - 02 multi-member district. During the 17th Legislature, she became vice chair of the 12th Standing Committee (Hygiene and Health) on May 7 of that year and a member of the Parliamentary Committee on Children and Adolescents on July 19; she also served on the Italian parliamentary delegation to the Parliamentary Assembly of the Council of Europe.

In December 2019, he was among the 64 signatories (41 of whom were from Forza Italia) for the confirmatory referendum on reducing the number of parliamentarians: a few months earlier, Berlusconi’s senators had walked out of the chamber during the vote on constitutional reform.

In the summer of 2021, he became vice president of the European People's Party Group in the Council of Europe.

== See also ==
- List of current Italian senators
