= Gaetano Nastri =

Italian politician

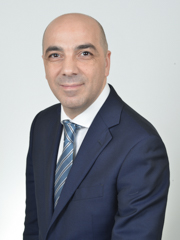

Senator of the Italian Republic
- Incumbent
- Assumed office March 23, 2018

Member of the Chamber of Deputies
- In office April 29, 2008 – March 22, 2018

Personal details
- Born: March 18, 1968 (age 58) Boscoreale, Italy
- Party: Brothers of Italy
- Occupation: Politician, insurance agent

Gaetano Nastri (March 18, 1968, Boscoreale, Italy) is an Italian politician.

== Political career ==
After failing to be elected in 2006, he was elected to the Chamber of Deputies in the 2008 general election from the ranks of the People of Freedom (PdL) in the Piedmont 2 constituency.

In December 2012 he left the PdL and joined Brothers of Italy (FdI).

In the 2013 general election, he was re-elected deputy in the same constituency in the lists of Brothers of Italy.

In the 2018 general election, he was elected to the Senate of the Republic in the uninominal constituency of Novara supported by the center-right coalition (FdI's share), outperforming Fabio Barbieri of the M5S (23.90 percent) and Elena Ferrara of the center-left (23.35 percent).

During the 18th legislature, he served as vice-chairman of the 13th Senate Standing Committee (Land, Environment and Environmental Heritage).

In the general elections of 2022 he was elected to the Senate of the Republic in the uninominal Piedmont - 03 (Novara) constituency with 52.01%, more than twice as much as his center-left opponent Rossano Pirovano (25.32%) and Action – Italia Viva candidate Roberto Cataldo Faggiano (8.45%). On October 19, 2022, with 110 votes he was elected Senior Quaestor of the Senate having obtained a majority of the votes of the assembly.
