= Franco Stradella =

Italian businessman and politician (1941–2022)

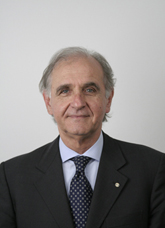

Member of the Chamber of Deputies of Italy
- In office 9 May 1996 – 14 March 2013
- Constituency: Piemonte 2

Personal details
- Born: Francesco Pietro Stradella; 12 May 1941 Felizzano, Italy
- Died: 25 October 2022 (aged 81) Quargnento, Italy
- Party: FI; PdL
- Occupation: Businessman

Francesco Pietro Stradella (12 May 1941 – 25 October 2022) was an Italian businessman and politician. A member of Forza Italia and later The People of Freedom, he served in the Chamber of Deputies from 1996 to 2013.

Stradella died in Quargnento on 25 October 2022, at the age of 81.
