= Giuseppe Naro =

Italian politician (born 1948)

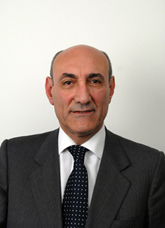
- Naro in 2008

Member of the Chamber of Deputies
- In office 5 May 2008 – 14 March 2013
- In office 4 June 2001 – 27 April 2006

Member of the Senate of the Republic
- In office 28 April 2006 – 28 April 2008

President of the Province of Messina
- In office 7 October 1986 – 20 November 1992

Personal details
- Born: 6 February 1948 (age 78) Militello Rosmarino, Province of Messina, Italy
- Party: Christian Democracy; Christian Democratic Centre; Union of the Centre
- Occupation: University professor

Giuseppe Naro (born 6 February 1948) is an Italian politician and academic. A member of the Christian Democracy before its dissolution, he subsequently joined the Christian Democratic Centre and the Union of the Centre. He served as a deputy, senator, and president of the Province of Messina.
