= Giovanni Procacci =

Italian politician

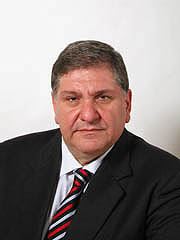

Member of the European Parliament
- In office 1999–2004
- Constituency: Italy

Personal details
- Born: 4 May 1955 Italy
- Party: Democratic Party

Giovanni Procacci (born May 4, 1955 in Bari), is an Italian politician, and was elected to the Italian Chamber of Deputies in the 2006 General election. Previously he was a Member of the European Parliament and a member of its Committee on Civil Liberties, Justice and Home Affairs.

After earning a degree in literature and philosophy in 1978, he worked as a non-tenured lecturer from 1978 to 1983, and as a tenured lecturer from 1984 to 1999. From 1999 to 2004 he was a member of the European Parliament during its 5th term. He is a member of La Margherita, which is a part of the Group of the Alliance of Liberals and Democrats for Europe.

From 1996 to 2001 he was a member of the national leadership of I Democratici. He was a member of the national executive of I Democratici from 1998 to 2001. From 2001 to 2004 he was a member of the national leadership of La Margherita (full Italian title: Democrazia è Libertà – La Margherita). He has been a member of the national executive of La Margherita since 2004. He was a municipal councillor and Democrazia Cristiana group leader in the municipality of Bitonto from 1985 to 1990. He became Deputy Mayor in 1990 and continued to serve until 1994.

During his 1999-2004 term in the European Parliament, he was a member of the Committee on Agriculture and Rural Development from 21 July 1999 to 14 January 2002 and from 17 January 2002 to 19 July 2004, the delegation for relations with southeast Europe from 29 September 1999 to 14 January 2002, the delegation for relations with the People's Republic of China from 7 February 2002 to 19 July 2004.

From December 12, 2004 onward he was a member of the Committee on Civil Liberties, Justice and Home Affairs. During this time, from 21 July 1999 to January 14, 2002 and from January 17, 2002 to February 19, 2003, he was a substitute for the Committee on Employment and Social Affairs.
