= Cesare Cursi =

Italian politician (1942–2025)

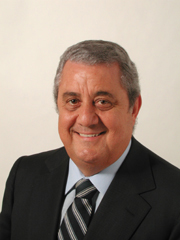
- Cursi in 2006

Member of the Senate of the Republic of Italy for Lazio
- In office 30 May 2001 – 14 March 2013

Member of the Chamber of Deputies of Italy for Roma-Viterbo-Latina-Frosinone
- In office 2 July 1987 – 14 April 1994

Personal details
- Born: 18 December 1942 Rome, Italy
- Died: 15 November 2025 (aged 82) Rome, Italy
- Political party: DC (1976–1994); PPI (1994–2001); AN (2001–2009); PdL (2009–2013)
- Occupation: Politician, lawyer

Cesare Cursi (18 December 1942 – 15 November 2025) was an Italian politician. A member of Christian Democracy, the National Alliance, and The People of Freedom, he served in the Chamber of Deputies from 1987 to 1994 and was a member of the Senate of the Republic from 2001 to 2013.

Cursi died in Rome on 15 November 2025, at the age of 83.
