= Giuseppe Scalera (politician) =

Italian politician (born 1954)

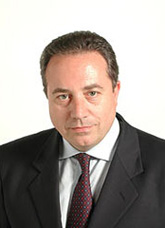
Giuseppe Scalera, 2008.

Giuseppe Scalera (born 26 March 1954) is an Italian surgeon and politician for The People of Freedom.

He was born in Naples, was educated as a physician and then surgeon, and was a president of the Naples Medical Association.

During the Legislature XIV and XV of Italy he was elected as a senator. He was elected to the Legislature XVI of Italy from Campania 1, serving the full term from 2008 to 2013.
