= Dini government =

52nd government of the Italian Republic

- 52nd Cabinet of Italy

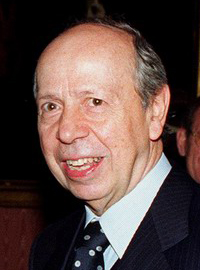
- Date formed: 17 January 1995
- Date dissolved: 17 May 1996 (487 days)

People and organisations
- Head of state: Oscar Luigi Scalfaro
- Head of government: Lamberto Dini
- No. of ministers: 21 (incl. Prime Minister)
- Ministers removed: 4
- Total no. of members: 25 (incl. Prime Minister)
- Member parties: Independents; External support: PDS, LN, PPI, FdV, Patto, AD, SI, Rete
- Status in legislature: Technocratic cabinet
- Opposition parties: FI, AN, CCD, FLD, PRC, LIF

History
- Outgoing election: 1996 election
- Legislature term: XII Legislature (1994–1996)
- Predecessor: First Berlusconi government
- Successor: First Prodi government

The Dini government was the 52nd government of the Italian Republic. It was the second and last cabinet of the XII Legislature. It held office from 17 January 1995 to 17 May 1996, a total of 486 days, or 1 year and 4 months. It was the Italian Republic's first Government of Experts, entirely composed of experts and officials from outside Parliament.

The government obtained the confidence of the House of Deputies on 25 January 1995 with 302 votes in favour, 39 against and 270 abstentions. It also obtained the confidence of the Senate on 1 February 1995 with 191 votes in favour, 17 against and 2 abstentions.

The government collapsed on 11 January 1996.

== History ==
After the fall of the Berlusconi Government, the President of the Republic Oscar Luigi Scalfaro entrusted Lamberto Dini (already Minister of the Treasury for the Berlusconi Government) with the task of forming a new cabinet.

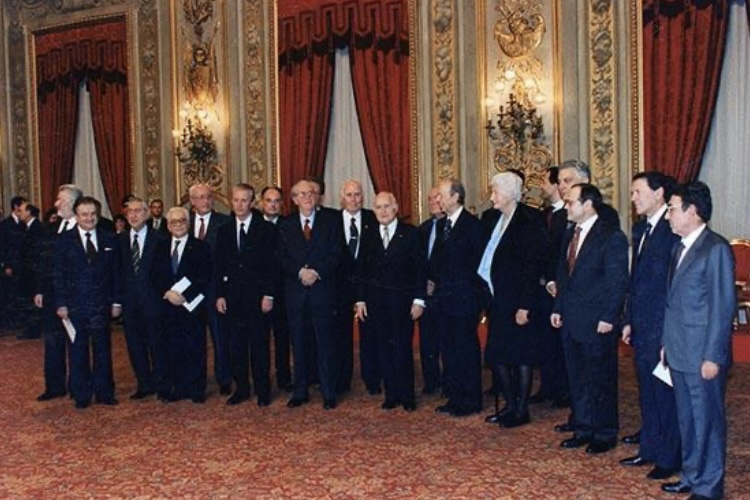
Official photo of the Amato's government after the oath at the Quirinal Palace

The new government, composed only of independents, was supported by the Democratic Party of the Left, Northern League, Italian People's Party, Greens, Segni Pact, Democratic Alliance, Italian Socialists and The Network. The parties of the Pole (Forza Italia National Alliance and Christian Democratic Centre) announced their intention to abstain from the vote of confidence, while the Communist Refoundation Party voted against.

After the split of the United Christian Democrats from the Italian People's Party, the government lost the majority to the Chamber of Deputies.

On 19 October 1995, the Senate approved an individual motion of no confidence against Minister of Justice Filippo Mancuso, introduced by the parties supporting the cabinet and endorsed by the Prime Minister. In May 1995 Mancuso had accused the methods used in the Mani Pulite investigation and asked for disciplinary action against the pool of magistrates who had carried out the investigations.

On 30 December 1995 Lamberto Dini resigned, since the government had already achieved the programmatic goals it was tasked by parliament to bring to term. On 16 February 1996, Scalfaro therefore dissolved parliament and called a snap election.

== Composition ==
Cabinet members
Portfolio	Minister	Took office	Left office	Party
Prime Minister	Lamberto Dini	17 January 1995	17 May 1996	Independent
Minister of Foreign Affairs	Susanna Agnelli	17 January 1995	17 May 1996	Independent
Minister of the Interior	Antonio Brancaccio	17 January 1995	9 June 1995	Independent
Minister of the Interior	Giovanni Rinaldo Coronas (ad interim)	9 June 1995	17 May 1996	Independent
Minister of Grace and Justice	Filippo Mancuso	17 January 1995	19 October 1995	Independent
Minister of Grace and Justice	Lamberto Dini (ad interim)	19 October 1995	16 February 1996	Independent
Minister of Grace and Justice	Vincenzo Caianiello (ad interim)	16 February 1996	17 May 1996	Independent
Minister of Budget and Economic Planning	Rainer Masera	17 January 1995	12 January 1996	Independent
Minister of Budget and Economic Planning	Augusto Fantozzi (ad interim)	12 January 1996	16 February 1996	Independent
Minister of Budget and Economic Planning	Mario Arcelli	16 February 1996	17 May 1996	Independent
Minister of Finance	Augusto Fantozzi	17 January 1995	17 May 1996	Independent
Minister of Treasury	Lamberto Dini (ad interim)	17 January 1995	17 May 1996	Independent
Minister of Defence	Domenico Corcione	17 January 1995	17 May 1996	Independent
Minister of Public Education	Giancarlo Lombardi	17 January 1995	17 May 1996	Independent
Minister of Public Works	Paolo Baratta	17 January 1995	17 May 1996	Independent
Minister of the Environment	Paolo Baratta	17 January 1995	17 May 1996	Independent
Minister of Agricultural, Food and Forestry Resources	Walter Luchetti	17 January 1995	17 May 1996	Independent
Minister of Transport and Navigation	Giovanni Caravale	17 January 1995	17 May 1996	Independent
Minister of Post and Telecommunications	Agostino Gambino	17 January 1995	17 May 1996	Independent
Minister of Industry, Commerce and Craftsmanship	Alberto Clò	17 January 1995	17 May 1996	Independent
Minister of Health	Elio Guzzanti	17 January 1995	17 May 1996	Independent
Minister of Foreign Trade	Alberto Clò (ad interim)	17 January 1995	17 May 1996	Independent
Minister of Labour and Social Security	Tiziano Treu	17 January 1995	17 May 1996	Independent
Minister of Cultural and Environmental Heritage	Antonio Paolucci	17 January 1995	17 May 1996	Independent
Minister of University and Scientific and Technological Research	Giorgio Salvini	17 January 1995	17 May 1996	Independent
Minister for Family and Social Solidarity (without portfolio)	Adriano Ossicini	17 January 1995	17 May 1996	Independent
Minister of Public Function and Regional Affairs (without portfolio)	Franco Frattini	17 January 1995	22 March 1996	Independent
Minister of Public Function and Regional Affairs (without portfolio)	Giovanni Motzo	22 March 1996	17 May 1996	Independent
Minister for Institutional Reforms (without portfolio)	Giovanni Motzo	17 January 1995	17 May 1996	Independent
Minister for Special Tasks (without portfolio)	Antonio Brancaccio	9 June 1995	26 August 1995	Independent
Secretary of the Council of Ministers	Lamberto Cardia	17 January 1995	17 May 1996	Independent

== See also ==
- Government of Experts
