= Paolo Savona =

Italian economist, professor, and politician (born 1936)

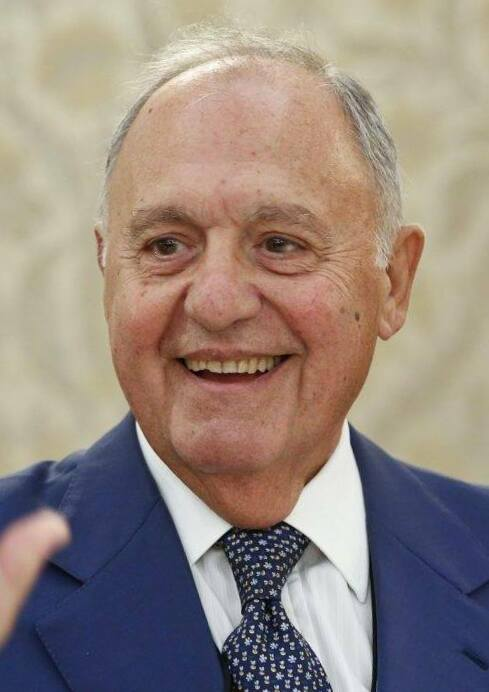

President of CONSOB
- Incumbent
- Assumed office 20 March 2019
- Preceded by: Mario Nava

Minister of European Affairs
- In office 1 June 2018 – 8 March 2019
- Prime Minister: Giuseppe Conte
- Preceded by: Enzo Moavero Milanesi
- Succeeded by: Lorenzo Fontana

Minister of Industry, Commerce and Craftmanship
- In office 28 April 1993 – 19 April 1994
- Prime Minister: Carlo Azeglio Ciampi
- Preceded by: Giuseppe Guarino
- Succeeded by: Paolo Baratta

Personal details
- Born: 6 October 1936 (age 90) Cagliari, Sardinia, Italy
- Party: PRI (1970s–1990s); Independent (since the 1990s)
- Education: University of Cagliari

Paolo Savona (born 6 October 1936) is an Italian economist, professor, and politician. He was the Italian Minister of European Affairs from 1 June 2018 until 8 March 2019, his second stint in government after 1993–1994. During the 2010s, Savona became one of the most fervent Eurosceptic economists in Italy.

== Institutional career ==
Savona was born in Cagliari, Sardinia, on 6 October 1936. After obtaining a degree in economics from the University of Cagliari in 1961, his career started at the Servizio Studi (internal research service) of the Bank of Italy. In that context, he worked together with Guido Carli (Governor, 1960–1975) and Paolo Baffi (Governor, 1975–1979), he attended classes at the Massachusetts Institute of Technology (MIT), where he came to work with Franco Modigliani. Together with Michele Fratianni, he studied international money creation. He also specialised at the Federal Reserve Board of Governors in Washington, D.C. In 1976, Carli became the President of General Confederation of Italian Industry (Confindustria) and asked Savona to follow him as Director-General, a post that he kept until 1980.

In the following years, Savona became President of Credito Industriale Sardo (1980–1989), Secretary-General for Economic Planning at the Ministry of Budget (1980–1982), Chief Executive Officer and then Managing Director of Banca Nazionale del Lavoro (1989–1990), President of the Fondo Interbancario di Tutela dei Depositi (1990–1999), Impregilo, Gemina, Aeroporti di Roma and Consorzio Venezia Nuova (2000–2010). After having been vice president of Capitalia, at the moment of the merging with UniCredit, he was named president of Banca di Roma. Between 2000 and 2010, he was also a Board Member of RCS MediaGroup and Telecom Italia. Politically, Savona was inspired by Ugo La Malfa and thus involved in the Italian Republican Party (PRI), where he was close to Giorgio La Malfa, until the early 1990s.

Savona served as Minister of Industry, Commerce and Craftmanship in the government led by Carlo Azeglio Ciampi (1993–1994), as Head of the Department for EU Policies of the Presidency of the Council of Ministers during the Silvio Berlusconi's third cabinet (2005–2006), under Minister Giorgio La Malfa, and, consequently, Coordinator of the Technical Committee for the Lisbon Strategy, which prepared the draft of the Italian plan for Growth and Occupation, presented to the European Commission in October 2005. In 2010, he was appointed President of Fondo Interbancario di Tutela dei Depositi for the second time and served as the Chairman of the Fintech startup Euklid Ltd until 2018. Savona also had several public offices in Italy and abroad, among which: member of the OECD Committee for the standardisation of financial statistics, and of the BIS Standing Committee on Eurodollars; President of the Technical-Scientific Council for Economic Planning, and of the Commission on Nuclear Power in Italy.

In May 2018, the Five Star Movement and the League proposed Savona for the role of Italian Minister of Economy and Finances. President Sergio Mattarella opposed his appointment, considering his outspoken support for Italy's covert exit from the euro an overwhelming risk for the country's economy. The two parties refused to replace Savona with any other candidate, forcing the appointed prime minister Giuseppe Conte to give up on his task of forming a government. Mattarella subsequently called Carlo Cottarelli to the Quirinal Palace on 28 May with the intention of giving him the task of forming a new government.

The appointing of Cottarelli sparked furious reaction from the leadership of the Five Star Movement, who accused Mattarella of committing a coup d'état against the will of the Italian people. On the evening of 27 May 2018 Di Maio announced that the M5S would initiate an impeachment procedure against President Mattarella for attempting to overthrow the Constitution; Giorgia Meloni, leader of Brothers of Italy, also announced an impeachment procedure against Mattarella for high treason. The move sparked a constitutional crisis: the Democratic Party announced for a demonstration in defence of Mattarella, denouncing Di Maio and Salvini as "authoritarian subsersives", while the Five Star Movement also announced a demonstration against Mattarella, calling him "antidemocratic".

On 30 May 2018, it was agreed that Savona would serve as Italian Minister of European Affairs after both parties agreed to reinstate Conte as their choice for the prime minister and instead nominate economics professor Giovanni Tria, an associate of Savona, as Minister of Economy and Finances, thus ending the crisis. Savona frequently denied being a Eurosceptic, saying that his Eurosceptic views had been exaggerated in the press, and that he never called for an exit from the eurozone and supported a strong and united Europe, commenting: "I want a different Europe, one that is stronger but fairer. Wild controversy has been made out of my ideas. I believe in European political union."

On 8 March 2019, Savona left his post as Minister of European Affairs in order to become president of the Italian Companies and Exchange Commission, the government authority responsible for regulating the Italian securities market.

== Academic career ==
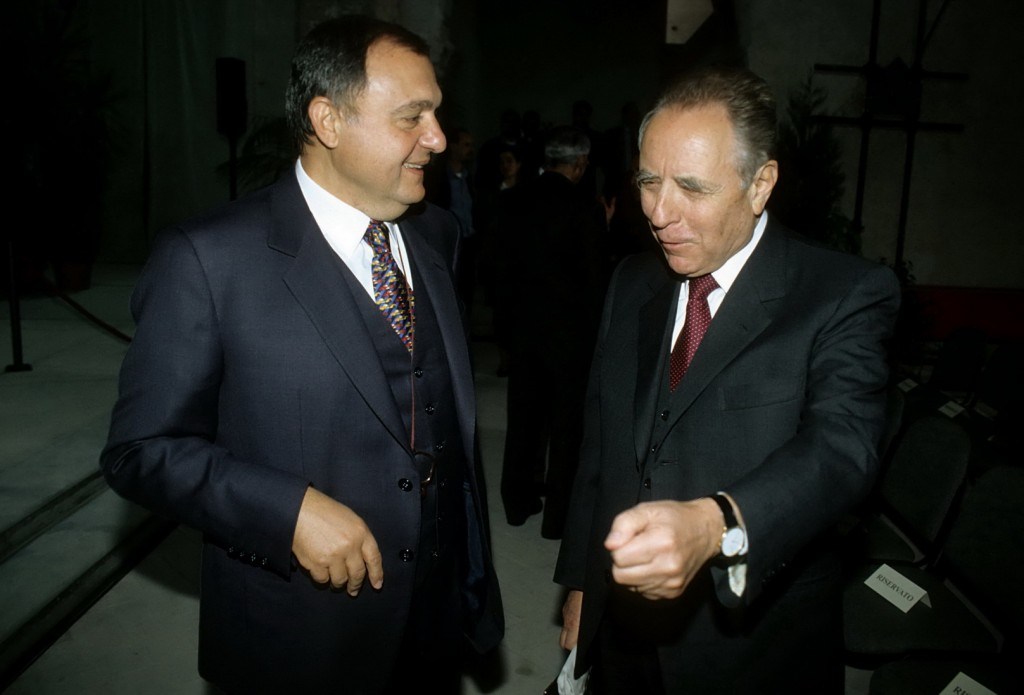
Savona with Carlo Azeglio Ciampi

Savona was the academic dean of the Faculty of Political Science and International Relations, and director of the PhD in Geopolitics and Economic Geopolitics of the e-University Guglielmo Marconi, of Rome. He served also as Professor emeritus of Economic Politics at the LUISS "Guido Carli" University.

Savona founded and directed with Michele Fratianni the Open Economies Review, and he is at present the Scientific Editor of the following journals: Economia Italiana, Journal of European Economic History and Review of Economic Conditions in Italy. He taught in the universities of Perugia and Rome Tor Vergata, and at Public Administration Superior School.

Savona's favourite research topics are the international monetary system, the effects of the growth of the derivatives market on the efficacy of the economic policy, and the gaps in productivity between the centre-north of Italy and its south. He is the author and joint author of several papers and books on the problems of the real, monetary and financial economy, and on methodological issues. Among his research, great relevance is attributed to the first econometric model of Italian economy M1BI, the first analyses on the international monetary base and Eurodollar, and on the macroeconomic effects of derivative contracts, which have all anticipated in a systematic way the happening of the dramatic events experienced by the Italian and international economy in the last forty years.

== Awards ==
Savona won the prize awarded by Associazione per il Progresso Economico in 1976, the Premio Capalbio 1998 in economy, the Premio IDI 1999 for the small and middle enterprise, the Premio Pisa 1999 for essay writing with the book Che cos'e' l'economia, the Premio Speciale 2000 for the sector 'Economy' as part of Premi della Cultura awarded by the Presidency of the Council of Ministers, the Premio 2008 in International economy awarded by Camera di Commercio di Genova, the Premio Scanno 2009 in economy, the VII Premio Donato Menichella 2009 for socio-economic studies, and the Premio Fata Morgana 2010 in economy and finance. He is Chinese Eisenhower Fellow of Taiwan and Jemolo Fellow at Nuffield College, Oxford University.

== Works ==
- La liquidità internazionale: proposta per la ridefinizione del problema, Il Mulino, Bologna 1972 (with M. Fratianni)
- La Sovranità Monetaria, Buffetti Ed., Roma, 1974
- L'Italia al bivio: ristagno o sviluppo, (with Giorgio La Malfa and Enzo Grilli), Laterza Ed., Roma 1985
- Eurodollars and International Banking, McMillan, Londra 1986 (with G. Sutija)
- Strategic Planning in International Banking, McMillan, Londra 1986 (with G. Sutija)
- Strutture finanziarie e sviluppo economico, Guerini Ass., Milano 1989
- World Trade: Monetary Order and Latina America, Mc Millan, Londrta 1990 (with G. Sutija)
- Il Terzo Capitalismo e la Società Aperta, Longanesi & C., Milano 1993
- Geoeconomia - Il dominio dello spazio economico, Franco Angeli, Milano 1995 (with Carlo Jean)
- L'Europa dai piedi d'argilla - Basi empiriche, fondamenti logici e conseguenze economiche dei parametri di Maastricht (in collaboration with Carlo Viviani), Libri Scheiwiller, Milano 1995
- Gli enigmi dell'economia. Come orientarsi nella scienza che condiziona la nostra vita, Mondadori Ed., Milano, 1996
- La disoccupazione e il terzo capitalismo: lavoro, finanza, tecnologia nell'era del mercato globale, interview by Gianni Pasquarelli, Sperling & Kupfer Editori, Milano 1997
- Inflazione, disoccupazione e crisi monetarie: come nascono, come si perpetuano e come si stroncano, Sperling & Kupfer Editori, Milano 1998
- Che cos'è l'economia, Sperling & Kupfer Editori, Milano 1999
- Alla ricerca della sovranità monetaria: breve storia della finanza straniera in Italia, Libri Scheiwiller - Collana Bianca Intesa, Milano 1999 e in edizione ridotta, Milano 2000
- Sovranità & ricchezza - Come riempire il vuoto politico della globalizzazione, Sperling & Kupfer Editori, 2001, 1st and 2nd edition (with Carlo Pelanda)
- Politica economica e new economy (with CD-ROM for practical exercises), McGraw-Hill Italia, Milano 2002
- Geopolitica economica. Globalizzazione, sviluppo e cooperazione, Sperling & Kupfer Editori, Milano 2004
- Sovranità & fiducia - Principi per una nuova architettura politica globale, Sperling & Kupfer Editori, Milano 2005 (with Carlo Pelanda)
- John Stuart Mill - Stuart Mill visto da Paolo Savona, Collana "I momenti d'oro dell'economia", Luiss University Press, Roma 2006
- Paolo Sylos Labini visto da Paolo Savona, Collana "I momenti d'oro dell'economia", Luiss University Press, Roma 2007
- L'Esprit d'Europe. Come recuperarlo riformando le istituzioni, Rubbettino Editore, Soveria Mannelli 2007
- I momenti d'oro dell'economia visti da Paolo Savona, Collana "I momenti d'oro dell'economia", Luiss University Press, Roma 2008
- Il governo dell'economia globale. Dalle politiche nazionali alla geopolitica: un manuale per il G8, Collana Formiche, Marsilio, Venezia 2009
- Il ritorno dello Stato padrone. I Fondi sovrani e il grande negoziato globale, Rubbettino Editore, Soveria Mannelli 2009 (with Patrizio Regola)
- Sugli effetti macroeconomici dei contratti derivati. Dieci lezioni, (with an English version), Luiss University Press, Roma 2010
- “On Monetary Analysis of Derivatives” (con Aurelio Maccario e Chiara Oldani), in The New Architecture of the International Monetary System, Kluwer Academic Publishers, Boston-Dordrecht-London 2000
- “Derivatives, Fiscal Policy and Financial Stability (con Chiara Oldani), in The ICFAI Journal of Derivatives Markets, n. 3, 2005, pp. 7-25
- “Derivatives, Money and Real Growth”, in Review of Financial Risk Management, National Taiwan University, Taipei n. 4, 2007, pp. 105–120
- “Subprime Credits or Subprime Policies? Some Thoughts on the Impact of the Credit Crisis on World Development”, in Review of Economic Conditions in Italy, n. 1, 2008, pp. 123–130 (“Subprime Credits or Subprime Policies? The Derivatives Conundrum”, con Chiara Oldani, Rainer S. Masera e Giancarlo Mazzoni, in Atti del Sixth Lucca Colloquium su Derivatives, Risk-Return and Subprime, tenutosi a Lucca il 19 settembre 2008, a cura della Fondazione Cesifin Alberto Predieri e dell’Associazione Guido Carli, in collaborazione con gli Editori del Journal of Financial Stability, pp. 149–207)
- Charles P. Kindleberger visto da Paolo Savona, Collana "I momenti d'oro dell'economia", 2ª serie, Luiss University Press, Roma 2010
- Sviluppo, rischio e conti con l'esterno delle regioni italiane. Lo schema di analisi della "pentola bucata", Laterza, Roma-Bari 2010 (with Riccardo De Bonis and Zeno Rotondi)
- Intelligence economica - Il ciclo dell'informazione nell'era della globalizzazione, Quaderni della Fondazione ICSA, Rubbettino Editore, Soveria Mannelli 2011 (with Carlo Jean)
- Le radici storiche e i fondamenti logici delle considerazioni finali del Governatore Carli (nell'opera dal titolo Considerazioni finali della Banca d'Italia di Guido Carli), Volume 3, Treves Editore, Roma 2011
- Postfazioni alla ristampa dei volumi di Paolo Baffi "Studi sulla moneta" e "Nuovi studi sulla moneta", Rubbettino Editore, Soveria Mannelli 2011
- La regionalizzazione del modello di sviluppo basato sulle esportazioni (con Zeno Rotondi), Rubbettino, Soveria Mannelli 2012
- ”Una proposta per ridurre il fardello del debito pubblico italiano” (con Michele Fratianni e Antonio Maria Rinaldi), in Leve per avviare la ripresa. Proposte ed esperienze manageriali a confronto, a cura di Donato Iacovone e Riccardo Paternò, Il Mulino, Bologna 2013, pp. 101–129
- “Do We Really Understand Derivatives?”, in Law and Economics, vol. 2, 2013, pp. 280–295, Capriglione Onlus e Queen Mary University
- "Una campana per l’Italia. Enrico Scaretti. A Bell for Italy", Treves editore, Roma 2013
- “Prefazione” alla riedizione del Breve trattato delle cause che possono far abbondare li Regni d’oro e argento dove non sono miniere con applicazione al Regno di Napoli di Antonio Serra, Rubbettino, Soveria Mannelli 2013, pp. 5–12
- “Il modello economico di Paolo Baffi”, in Bancaria, Numero speciale, n. 11, 2013, pp. 26–33
- “Su ‘i ragazzi di Via Nazionale’ (1963-1976)”, in Nuova Antologia, gennaio-marzo 2014, pp. 30-38
- "Il banchiere del mondo. Eugene Robert Black e l’ascesa della cultura dello sviluppo in Italia" (con Giovanni Farese), Rubbettino, Soveria Mannelli 2014
- “Il Codice di Camaldoli letto da un economista”, in Michele Dau, Il Codice di Camaldoli, Castelvecchi, Roma 2015, pp. 145–155
- "Dalla fine del laissez-faire alla fine della liberal-democrazia. L’attrazione fatale per la giustizia sociale e la molla di una nuova rivoluzione globale", Rubbettino, Soveria Mannelli 2016
- "Why Democracy State and Market failed to protect the system of individual freedoms", Lambert Academic Publishing, Saarbrücken 2017 (anche edizione youcanprint, Lecce 2017)
- “Beyhond the trilemma. A global design to reconcile democracy, the state and the market” (con Giovanni Farese), in World Economics, July 2017, pp. 123–137
