= Masera (surname) =

Masera is an Italian surname. Notable people with the surname include:

- Rainer Masera (born 1944), Italian academic and economist
- Natale Masera (1910–1985), Italian professional football player

== See also ==
- Masera
- Massera (disambiguation)
