= Giovanni Rinaldo Coronas =

Italian politician

Giovanni Rinaldo Coronas OMRI
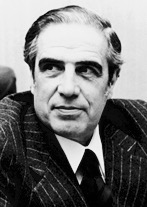

Minister of the Interior
- In office 9 June 1995 – 17 May 1996
- Prime Minister: Lamberto Dini
- Preceded by: Antonio Brancaccio
- Succeeded by: Giorgio Napolitano

Chief of the Police
- In office 19 January 1979 – 27 April 1984
- Preceded by: Giuseppe Parlato
- Succeeded by: Giuseppe Porpora

Personal details
- Born: 10 April 1919 Castelvetrano, Italy
- Died: 5 January 2008 (aged 88) Rome, Italy
- Profession: Prefect

Giovanni Rinaldo Coronas (10 April 1919 – 5 January 2008) was an Italian prefect.

== Biography ==
Giovanni Rinaldo Coronas was born in Castelvetrano (Sicily) on 10 April 1919, from a family originally from Siniscola. After graduating in law, his career started from the Turin Police Headquarters, but in 1943 Coronas passed to the Civil Administration of the Interior. He carried out the duties of head of cabinet at the prefectures of Nuoro and Forlì.

In 1954 he was in service in Rome at the General Directorate of Civil Administration. Appointed prefect in 1967, he was deputy police chief until 1974. On 19 January 1979 he was appointed Chief of police. He remained in office until 27 April 1984.

From 9 June 1995 to 17 May 1996 he served as Minister of the Interior in the Dini Cabinet.

He died on 5 January 2008 in Rome.

== Honours and awards ==
- Italy: Grand Cross Knight of the Order of Merit of the Italian Republic (27 December 1977)
- Italy: Grand Officer of the Order of Merit of the Italian Republic (27 December 1970)
