= Antonio Brancaccio (judge) =

Italian politician

Minister of the Interior
- In office 17 January 1995 – 8 June 1995
- Prime Minister: Lamberto Dini
- Preceded by: Roberto Maroni
- Succeeded by: Giovanni Rinaldo Coronas

President of the Supreme Court of Cassation
- In office 20 November 1986 – 16 January 1995
- Preceded by: Giuseppe Tamburrino
- Succeeded by: Vittorio Sgroi

Personal details
- Born: 26 August 1923 Maddaloni, Italy
- Died: 26 August 1995 (aged 72) Göttingen, Germany
- Profession: Magistrate

Antonio Brancaccio (26 August 1923 – 26 August 1995) was an Italian judge.

== Background ==
Antonio Brancaccio was born on 26 August 1923 in Maddaloni, Campania.

He served as President of the Supreme Court of Cassation from 20 November 1986 to 16 January 1995 and as Minister of the Interior in the Dini Cabinet from 17 January 1995 to 8 June 1995. He resigned for health reasons and died a few months later - on his 72nd birthday - in a clinic of Göttingen, in Germany, where he was being treated for a brain tumor.
