= Piero Barucci =

Italian politician (1933–2026)

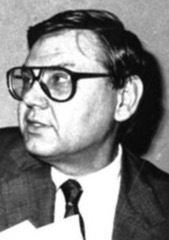

Minister of Treasury
- In office 28 June 1992 – 10 May 1994
- Prime Minister: Giuliano Amato; Carlo Azeglio Ciampi
- Preceded by: Guido Carli
- Succeeded by: Lamberto Dini

Personal details
- Born: 29 June 1933 Florence, Italy
- Died: 26 February 2026 (aged 92) Florence, Italy
- Party: Independent
- Education: University of Florence
- Profession: University professor, banker

Piero Barucci (29 June 1933 – 26 February 2026) was an Italian academic, economist and politician who served as Minister of Treasury from 1992 to 1994.

== Early life and education ==
Barucci was born in Florence on 29 June 1933. He held a bachelor's degree in economics which he received from the University of Florence.

== Career ==
Barucci worked as a professor of political economy and the history of economics both at the University of Siena and his alma mater, the University of Florence, from 1966 to 1990. He was the dean of the faculty of economics and commerce at the University of Florence from 1981 to 1983. He was also the chairman of Monte dei Paschi di Siena and of Italian International Bank of London from 1983 to 1990. His other posts included board member of the Istituto per la Ricostruzione Industriale (1987–2000), managing director of Credito Italiano (1990–1992), and chairman of the Associazione Bancaria Italiana (1987–1991).

He served as the minister of treasury and civil service in the first Guilano Amato cabinet from June 1992 to April 1993. Barucci succeeded Guido Carli in the aforementioned post. Then Barucci was appointed minister of treasury to the Carlo Azeglio Ciampi cabinet and was in office from April 1993 to April 1994. After leaving public offices, he began to work in different private firms, including private banks. He also founded a private bank in 1998, Banco Emiliano Romagnolo and served as the vice-president of the bank. In 2001, he led the consortium of businessmen that took over Italian football club Fiorentina from the Cecchi Gori Group. In addition, he was named as the chairman of Banca Leonardo in May 2005. On 7 May 2007, he began to work at the competition authority as a commissioner.

== Death ==
Barucci died on 26 February 2026, at the age of 92.

== Awards ==
In 2000, Barucci was awarded the Dovizo prize for his distinguished achievements.
