= Alberto Clò =

Italian businessman, politician and academic (born 26 January 1947)

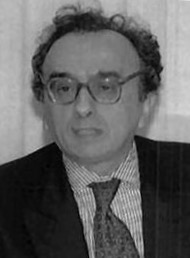

Minister of Industry
- In office 17 January 1995 – 16 May 1996
- Prime Minister: Lamberto Dini

Personal details
- Born: 26 January 1947 (age 79)
- Party: Independent
- Education: University of Bologna

Alberto Clò (born 26 January 1947) is an Italian businessman, politician and academic. He served as minister of industry from 1995 to 1996. He was also director of the Italian company Eni SpA.

== Early life and education ==
Clò was born in 1947. He holds a political sciences degree from the University of Bologna.

== Career ==
Clò worked as a full professor of applied economics at the department of economics at the University of Bologna where he was promoted to the rank of associate professor of industrial economy in 1987. In 1980, he founded and edited a magazine entitled Energia. He served as minister of industry from 17 January 1995 to 16 May 1996, and acting interim minister of foreign trade in the cabinet led by Prime Minister Lamberto Dini. In addition, Clò was the president of the council of industry and energy ministers of the European Union during the six-month Italian presidency in the same period.

Clò was the director of Eni SpA since June 1999 and also former director of various other firms including Atlantia SpA, Italcementi SpA, De Longhi SpA and IREN SpA. In April 2012, Clò was appointed the Advanced Capital's special advisor for investments in the energy sector. In 2013, he was named independent director of the Snam SpA.

== Works ==
- Oil Economics and Policy. Springer Science & Business Media. 2000. ISBN 978-0792379065.
- Economia e politica del petrolio. Compositori. 2002. ISBN 978-8877942203.
- Lezioni di economia industriale. Dupress. 2003. ISBN 978-8886909488.
- Il rebus energetico. Il Mulino. 2008. ISBN 978-8815115140.
- Appunti di economia industriale. Il Mulino. 2009. ISBN 978-8886909709.
- Si fa presto a dire nucleare. Il Mulino. 2010. ISBN 978-8815146359.
- Appunti di economia delle public utilities. Dupress. 2012. ISBN 978-8895451626.
- Energia e clima. L'altra faccia della medaglia. Il Mulino. 2017. ISBN 978-8815272928.
- Il ricatto del gas russo. Ragioni e responsabilità. Il Sole 24 Ore. 2022. ISBN 979-1254840436.

=== Translated works ===
- Hans H. Landsberg; et al. (1986). Alberto Clò (ed.). Vivere con l'incertezza. Il problema dell'energia nel mondo contemporaneo. Il Mulino.

== Awards ==
Clò has been awarded Cavaliere di Gran Croce (Knight of Great Cross) of the Republic of Italy in 1996.
