= Lamberto Cardia =

Italian politician (1934–2026)

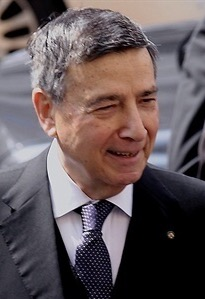
- Cardia in 2016

Secretary of the Council of Ministers
- In office 17 May 1995 – 17 May 1996
- Prime Minister: Lamberto Dini
- Preceded by: Gianni Letta
- Succeeded by: Enrico Luigi Micheli

Chairman of the Commissione Nazionale per le Società e la Borsa
- In office 30 June 2003 – 18 November 2010
- Preceded by: Luigi Spaventa
- Succeeded by: Giuseppe Vegas

Personal details
- Born: 29 May 1934 Tivoli, Italy
- Died: 14 March 2026 (aged 91) Rome, Italy
- Party: Independent
- Education: Sapienza University of Rome
- Occupation: Civil servant

Lamberto Cardia (29 May 1934 – 14 March 2026) was an Italian politician. An independent, he served as Secretary of the Council of Ministers from 1995 to 1996 and was chairman of the Commissione Nazionale per le Società e la Borsa from 2003 to 2010.

Cardia died in Rome on 14 March 2026, at the age of 91.
