= Michael Tusiime =

Ugandan politician (born 1973)

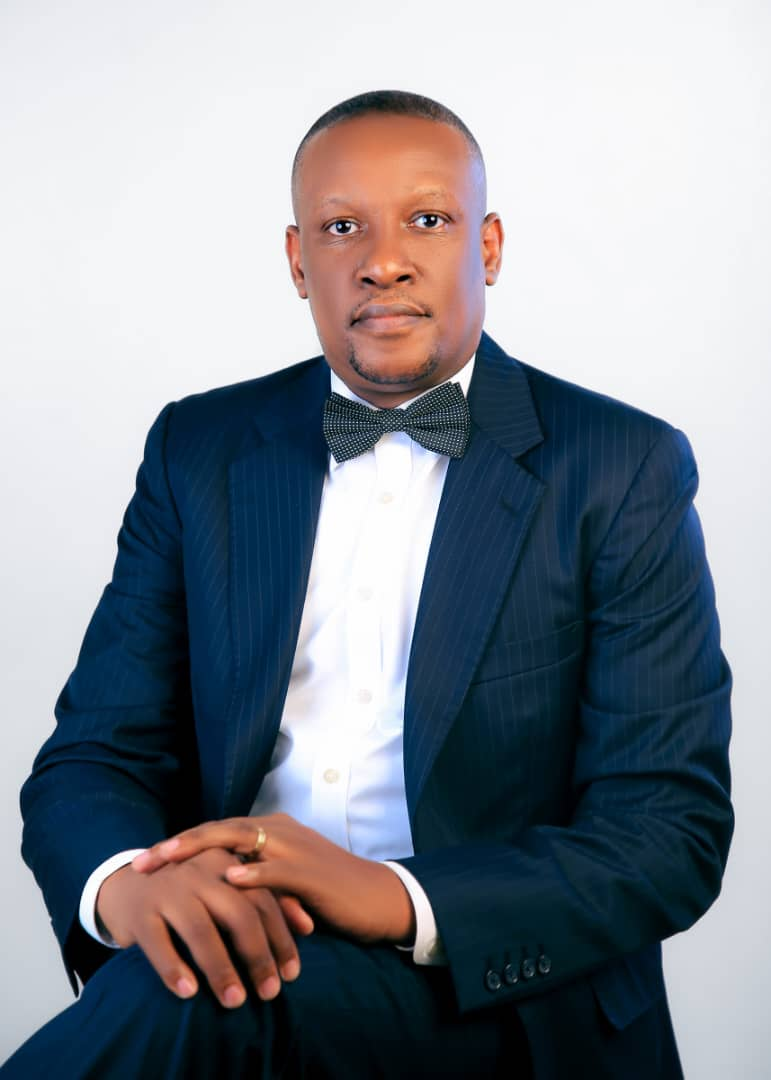
- A Ugandan Economist, Tax Consultant, Administrator, Governance Specialist, Politician,Public Finance, Budgeting and Accountability Specialist.

Honorable

Personal details
- Born: Michael Tusiime; 29 January 1973 (age 53) Mbarara, Uganda
- Citizenship: Uganda
- Spouse: Prilla Kabagambe Tusiime
- Education: Makerere University (Bachelor of Social Science in Economics) (Master in Economic Policy & Planning)
- Occupation: Economist, politician
- Known for: Tax consultancy, Budgeting, Accountability and Public Finance Management

Michael Tusiime (born 29 January 1973) is a Ugandan economist, tax consultant, administrator, governance specialist, politician, public finance, budgeting and accountability specialist. He served as the Member of Parliament representing Mbarara Municipality in the 10th Parliament of Uganda (2016-2021) on the National Resistance Movement (NRM), the ruling political party in Uganda. He is currently the Director of Public Expenditure Accountability at the Parliament of Uganda, having previously served as a Consultant to Parliament from 2022 to 2025. Tusiime worked as member of the Committee on Commissions, Statutory Authorities & State Enterprises and the Committee on Presidential Affairs in the 10th Parliament of Uganda.

Tusiime has worked in public finance, tax administration, governance and public policy for more than two decades. He previously served with the Uganda Revenue Authority (URA) in various supervisory and technical roles before joining elective politics. He is currently a consultant to the Parliament of Uganda on accountability committees and serves on the Technical Team of the Presidential Advisory Committee on Budget (PACOB). Tusiime also served on the Tripartite Committee for the structuring of Bank of Uganda.

He is the founding Chairperson of Interventions For Rural Transformation (IFORT), the founding CEO of Tusiime Foundation, a board member of Iron Bridge Finance (IBF) and a resident research fellow at Agency for Transformation (AFT). He also worked in supervisory role with Uganda Revenue Authority (URA) from 1997 to 2010 and among other assignments; Tusiime formerly served as a liaison officer to the president of the Republic of Sierra Leone and as a research adviser to IMF's resident tax adviser in Uganda.

== Early life and education ==
Tusiime was born in Mbarara District, Ankole sub-region, on 29 January 1973 in an Anglican family of the Banyankole. He had his primary education in his home district of Mbarara acquiring his PLE certification in 1986. He then attended Ntare School and Namilyango College for his O-Level education, attaining his UCE certification in 1990, and then Mbarara High School for his A-Level education where he acquired his UACE certification in 1993.

Tusiime further advanced to Makerere University where he graduated in 1997 with a Bachelor of Social Science in Economics. Still in the same institution of higher education, he acquired postgraduate certificates in Project Monitoring and Evaluation and another in Public administration and Management in the year 2012. Tusiime also holds a Master in Economic Policy & Planning from Makerere University, An Executive masters in business administration (Finance and Accounting) from Guglielmo Marconi University in Italy, A graduand of Master's of Laws (Corporate governance) from Cumbria University U.K and certificates in Arbitration & Alternative Dispute Resolution and another in Practical Skills & Techniques in International Negotiations, from the United Nations Institute for Training and Research (UNITAR) in Geneva. Tusiime is now a PhD candidate of Doctor of Economics and Master of Research Daul Degree PhD (Dr of Economics and Master of Research) at the University For Graduate Studies in Management, UGSM – Monarch Business School in Switzerland.

== Career ==
Upon acquiring his bachelor's degree, Tusiime took on supervisory roles at Uganda Revenue Authority, from 1997 to 2010, acquiring extensive knowledge in tax administration in the process. In 2011, he founded Interventions For Rural Transformation (IFORT) and Tusiime Foundation; organizations in which he still serves to date as chairperson and chief executive officer respectively.

In 2010, Tusiime resigned from URA to join elective politics as an independent politician after temporarily falling out with the NRM during the ruling political party's primaries. On losing in the 2011 polls, Tusiime strategized for the 2016 parliamentary elections and returned on the NRM ticket, this time overpowering his nemesis Medard Bitekyerezo in the party's primaries and in the general elections and became a member of the 10th Parliament in the Pearl of Africa representing Mbarara Municipality.

In the 10th Parliament, Tusiime serves on the Committee on Commissions, Statutory Authorities and State Entreprises and the Committee on Presidential Affairs in the 10th Parliament of Uganda. In early 2017, Tusiime moved a motion that sought to investigate the circumstances under which a Shs6b 'presidential handshake' was shared out amongst 42 government officials without the knowledge of the Auditor General.

== Personal details ==
Michael Tusiime is married to Prilla Kabagambe Tusiime and they have three children; Gareth Atamba Tusiime, Shane Akunda Tusiime and Michelle Amanda Tusiime.

== See also ==
- Mbarara District
