= Filippo Mancuso =

Italian judge and politician (1922–2011)

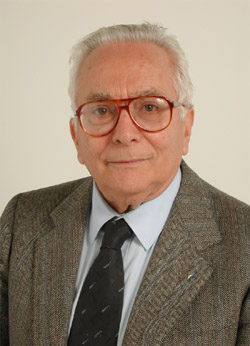

Minister of Justice
- In office 17 January 1995 – 19 October 1995
- Prime Minister: Lamberto Dini
- Preceded by: Alfredo Biondi
- Succeeded by: Lamberto Dini

Personal details
- Born: 22 July 1922 Palermo, Italy
- Died: 30 May 2011 (aged 88) Rome, Italy
- Party: None (2002–2011)
- Other political affiliations: Forza Italia (1995–2002)
- Education: University of Palermo
- Profession: Judge

Filippo Mancuso (22 July 1922 – 30 May 2011) was an Italian judge and politician who served as Italy's Minister of Justice in the Dini government in 1995. From 1996 to 2006, he was also a member of the Chamber of Deputies.

== Career ==
Born on 22 July 1922 in Palermo, Mancuso graduated in Law at the University of Palermo. As a magistrate, he headed the Bari Court of Appeal and the Attorney General's Office at the Rome Court of Appeal. During his tenure as Attorney General, he collaborated with Giovanni Falcone and Paolo Borsellino in the fight against the Sicilian Mafia. In January 1995, he was appointed Minister of Justice in the government of Lamberto Dini.

In October 1995, the Senate of the Republic voted a motion of no confidence against Mancuso; it was the first time this happened during the republican period. The governing centre-left coalition and Lega Nord complained about the review of the Mani pulite pool during Tangentopoli. Mancuso was elected for the first time as deputy in the 1996 Italian general election with Forza Italia, and he was confirmed in the 2001 Italian general election. He left Forza Italia in 2002 after he was not elected to the Constitutional Court of Italy due to the opposition of the centre-left coalition. Mancuso agreed with Silvio Berlusconi to nominate another person for the Constitutional Court, possibly his nephew Mario Serio; however, Forza Italia then nominated Romano Vaccarella, a close friend of Cesare Previti. After 2006, Mancuso retired to private life until his death in Rome on 30 May 2011.

== See also ==
- Judiciary of Italy

Political offices
Preceded by Alfredo Biondi	Minister of Judtice; 1995	Succeeded by Lamberto Dini
