= Domenico Corcione =

Italian army officer and defence minister (1929–2020)

Domenico Corcione OMRI
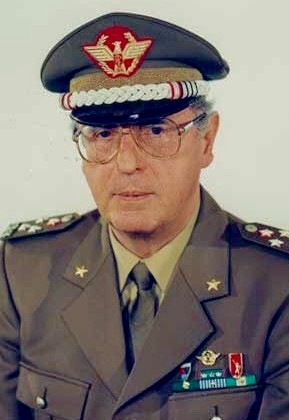

Minister of Defence
- In office 17 January 1995 – 17 May 1996
- Prime Minister: Lamberto Dini
- Preceded by: Cesare Previti
- Succeeded by: Beniamino Andreatta

Personal details
- Born: 20 April 1929 Turin, Piedmont, Kingdom of Italy
- Died: 3 January 2020 (aged 90) Turin, Piedmont, Italy
- Party: Independent
- Education: Modena Military Academy

Military service
- Allegiance: Italy
- Branch/service: Italian Army
- Years of service: 1950–1993
- Rank: Army corps general

Domenico Corcione (20 April 1929 – 3 January 2020) was an Italian general who served as defence minister of Italy between 1995 and 1996.

== Early life and education ==
Corcione was born in Turin on 20 April 1929. He entered Modena Military Academy in 1950 and graduated in 1952.

== Career ==
Corcione was a general and served as the chief of the defence staff. Then he was appointed defence minister, being the first military figure to hold the post in the history of the Italian Republic. He was appointed to the post on 17 January 1995 and served in the cabinet led by the Prime Minister Lamberto Dini until 17 May 1996.

While serving as the minister of defence Corcione reported on 8 February 1996 that the Fascist Italian army employed the poisonous gas during the Second Italo-Ethiopian War between 1935 and 1937.

== Death ==
On 3 January 2020, Corcione died in Turin at age 90.

== Decorations ==
Order of Military Merit (Grand Officer; Brazil)
