= Giuseppe Vegas =

Italian politician (born 1951)

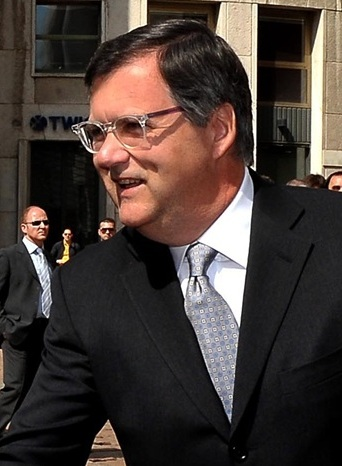

President of CONSOB
- In office 2010–2017
- Preceded by: Lamberto Cardia
- Succeeded by: Mario Nava

Member of the Chamber of Deputies
- In office 29 April 2008 – 10 January 2011
- Constituency: Piedmont 2

Member of the Senate
- In office 9 May 1996 – 29 April 2008

Personal details
- Born: 16 June 1951 Milan
- Party: Forza Italia; The People of Freedom
- Education: University of Milan

Giuseppe Vegas (born 16 June 1951, in Milan) is an Italian politician.

== Biography ==
Graduated with honors in law in 1973 at the University of Milan, he was scientific director of the Einaudi Foundation in Rome and editor-in-chief of Einaudi News, the foundation's newsletter. He has worked in the field of public administration since 1975. Since 1978 he has been a parliamentary councilor at the Senate of the Republic, where he has long been secretary of the Budget Commission.

In 1995 he was appointed Undersecretary for Finance and, subsequently, to the Treasury in the Dini Government. In the subsequent 1996 election, he was elected senator in the Novara constituency for the Pole for Freedoms. In this legislature he was a member of the Budget Commission, of the Bicameral Commission for constitutional reforms and of the Council for the Regulations. He was also vice-president of the Forza Italia parliamentary group.

He was delegated by his party to the congress of the European People's Party in Berlin in January 2001. Re-elected to the Senate in the 2001 parliamentary election, again in the Novara uninominal constituency. Appointed Undersecretary and subsequently Deputy Minister of Economy and Finance of the governments led by Silvio Berlusconi in the five-year period 2001–2006.

In the 2006 political elections he was re-elected senator for the third time for the Forza Italia slate in Piedmont. He was a member of the Budget Commission and of the European Union Policy Commission. He also held the position of deputy leader of Forza Italia in the Senate.

In the 2008 general elections he was re-elected in Parliament (this time in the Chamber of Deputies) on the PdL list and was appointed Undersecretary and subsequently deputy minister of the Economy and Finance in the fourth Berlusconi government.

On November 18, 2010 he was appointed by the Council of Ministers to the office of President of CONSOB. He continued to participate in the proceedings of the Chamber of Deputies, including the vote of no confidence in the Berlusconi government on December 14, 2010, as his resignation was scheduled after votes on no-confidence motions.

On 10 January 2011 the Chamber of Deputies approved his resignation.
