= Massera =

Massera is a surname. Notable people with the surname include:

- Emilio Eduardo Massera (1925–2010), Argentine military officer
- Ileana Leonidoff (1893–1968), Russian-born dancer who once used the name Leonidoff-Massera
- José Luis Massera (1915–2002), Uruguayan mathematician and politician

== See also ==
- 10690 Massera, a minor planet named after José Luis Massera
- Masera (surname)
