= Guglielmo Marconi University =

University in Rome, Italy

- Università degli Studi Guglielmo Marconi
- Type: Private university, non-profit
- Established: 2004
- Accreditation: MIUR
- Affiliations: GUIDE Association
- Rector: Professor Marco Abate
- Academic staff: 500
- Students: 22,000 (2025)
- Location: Rome, Italy
- Campus: Urban
- Colors: Green and white
- Website: www.unimarconi.it

Guglielmo Marconi University (GMU; Italian: Università degli Studi Guglielmo Marconi), often abbreviated as UniMarconi is a private, non-profit university in Rome, Italy. The university offers degrees at the undergraduate and graduate level.

== History ==
The university was originally proposed by the Tertium Foundation, a consortium formed by "Cassa di Risparmio di Roma", the InterUniversity consortium "Formazione per la Comunicazione", and "Cassa di Risparmio di Bologna" in Rome, Italy. Guglielmo Marconi University was approved with a 2004 Ministerial Decree of qualifications recognized by Italian law and by the Italian education system. In 2005, the university joined the GUIDE Association - a consortium of 120 universities.

== Campus ==
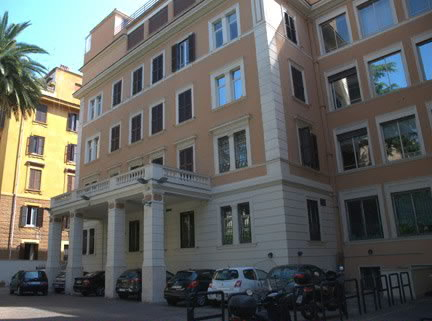
Guglielmo Marconi University, Lecture Halls and Classrooms

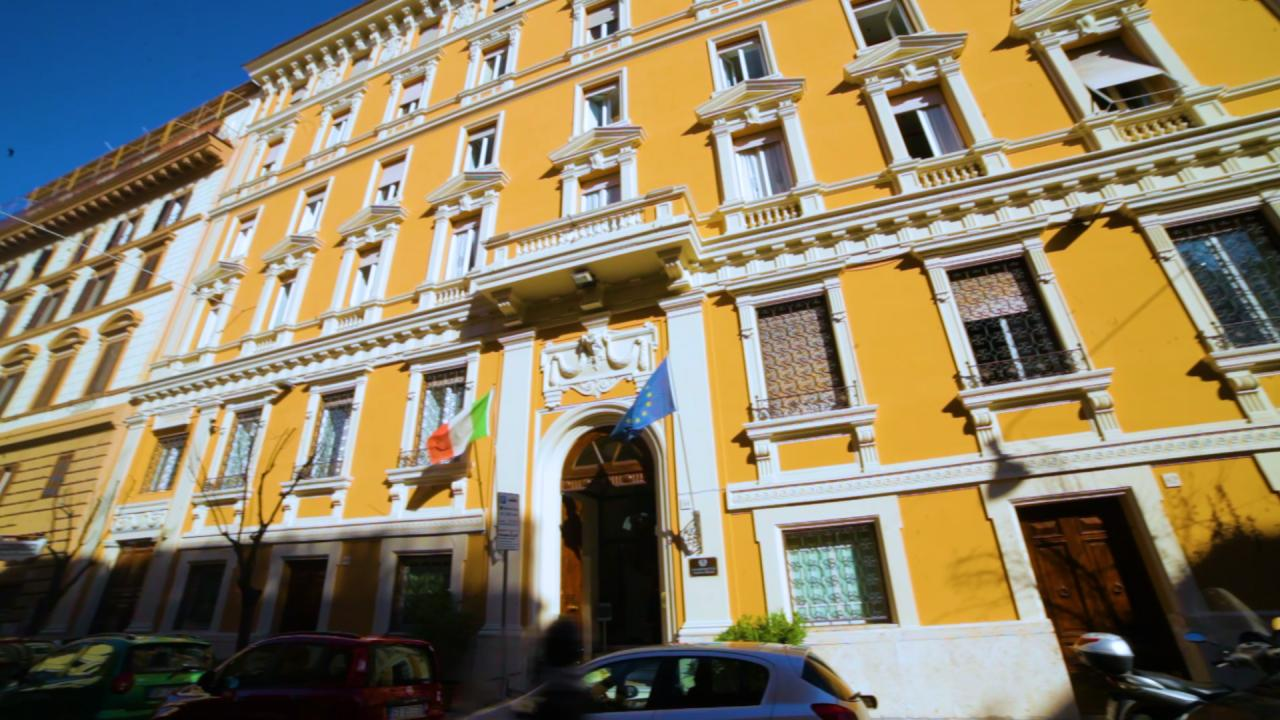
Guglielmo Marconi University, Headquarters and Administrative Offices

Guglielmo Marconi University has three main campuses, all located in Rome:

- Headquarters and Administrative Offices - located in Vio Plinio
- Didactic Production Center - located in Via Vittoria Colonna
- Classrooms and Lecture Halls - located in Via Paolo Emilio

The university also has more than twenty examination locations throughout Italy and around the world.

== Academics ==
Guglielmo Marconi University offers degrees at the undergraduate and graduate level. Academic programs are housed in six schools:

- Economy
- Law
- Letters
- Social, Human and Health Sciences
- Political Sciences
- Engineering

== Accreditation ==
- Guglielmo Marconi University is accredited by the Italian Ministry of Education (“Ministero dell’Istruzione, dell’Università e della Ricerca”).
- ANVUR (Agenzia Nazionale di Valutazione del Sistema Universitario e della Ricerca) is the Italian National Agency for the Evaluation of the University and Research Systems. GMU Result = Ctel - SATISFACTORY

== Research and projects ==
The university carries out an intense research activity that involves its professors, scientific publications and journals, laboratories, PhDs, and research groups engaged in projects at national and European level with particular regard to the area of energy and the environment, as well as the sector of applications of higher education technologies. Research activities are organized into four departments:

- Department of Legal and Political Science
- Department of Economic and Business Science
- Department of Social, Human and Health Sciences
- Department of Engineering sciences

== Student media ==
GMU Magazine is a monthly publication started in 2016 to promote the university's academic and research activities. The magazine is divided into three sections: Academic Highlights, Spotlight on Research, and Glance at the Future. Each section is dedicated to key activities, international projects, events, and news the university wishes to share with international community members and partners. The main themes discussed in the magazine concern e-Learning, Mobility, Training, Academic Research, Technology, Industry 4.0, and Current News (relevant to these topics).

== Athletics ==
The Italian Rugby Federation and Guglielmo Marconi University have entered into an agreement for athletic scholarships.

== Notable people ==
=== Alumni ===
- Federica Cesarini
- Antonio Virgili

=== Faculty ===
- Maria Chiara Carrozza
- Rainer Masera
- Carlo Pelanda
- Paolo Savona
