= Agostino Gambino =

Italian jurist and politician (1933–2021)

Minister of Communications
- In office 17 January 1995 – 17 May 1996
- President: Lamberto Dini
- Preceded by: Giuseppe Tatarella
- Succeeded by: Antonio Maccanico

Personal details
- Born: 6 July 1933 Genoa, Italy
- Died: 2 October 2021 (aged 88) Rome, Italy
- Party: Independent

Agostino Gambino (6 July 1933 – 2 October 2021) was an Italian jurist and politician. He served as Minister of Communications and President of the Associazione Internazionale di Diritto delle Assicurazioni.

== Biography ==
Gambino was Minister of Communications under the leadership of Lamberto Dini from 17 January 1995 to 17 May 1996. He held a Grand Cross of the Order of Merit of the Italian Republic.

A graduate of Heidelberg University and the University of Hamburg, he became a lawyer in 1958. He became a professor in 1965 and taught commercial and bankruptcy law at the University of Sassari, the Ca' Foscari University of Venice, and the Sapienza University of Rome. He became a professor emeritus in 2005.

Gambino became co-director of the Rivista di diritto commerciale and President of the Associazione Internazionale di Diritto delle Assicurazioni. He served on the board of directors of the Banca Nazionale dell'Agricoltura, MEIE, and Fata Assicurazioni. He was government commissioner of Consorzi agrari d'Italia. Following the collapse of Banco Ambrosiano, he was appointed by the Vatican and Italian governments to co-chair the international commission to manage relations between the bank and the Institute for the Works of Religion.

Gambino also worked for the Ministry of Justice, the Ministry of State Participations, and the Ministry of State Participations. In 1994, he became a part of a government commission nicknamed the "three wise men". The commission was placed in charge of mitigating conflicts between the private sector and properties of Prime Minister Silvio Berlusconi.

Agostino Gambino died in Rome on 2 October 2021 at the age of 88.

== Works ==
- L'assicurazione nella teoria dei contratti aleatori
- Fondamenti di diritto commerciale
- Impresa e società di persone
- Società di capitali
