= Carlo Pelanda =

Italian economist and professor

Carlo A. Pelanda
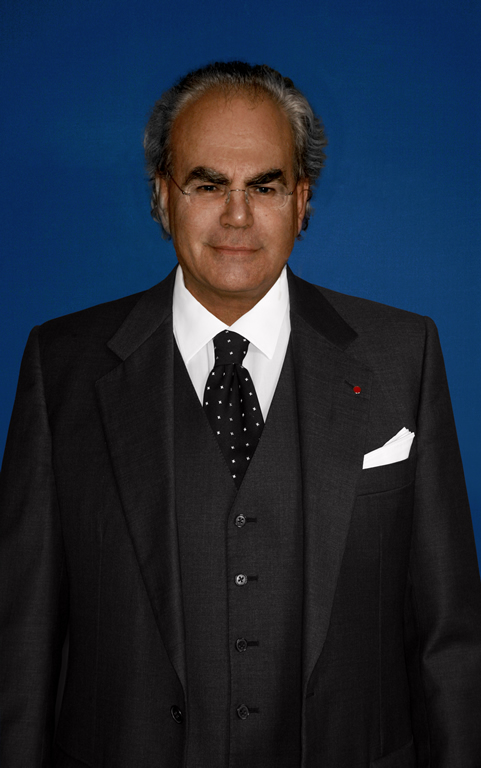

Personal details
- Born: April 17, 1951 (age 75) Tolmezzo, Italy
- Education: University of Trieste
- Profession: Economist, University Professor, Entrepreneur
- Website: www.carlopelanda.com www.quadriviogroup.com

Carlo A. Pelanda (born April 17, 1951, in Tolmezzo, Italy) is an Italian professor of Political Science and Economics.

== Biography ==
Pelanda received a Doctorate in Political Science from the University of Trieste where he specialized in Strategic Studies, International Scenarios, and Systems Theory. He currently holds academic positions at Guglielmo Marconi University and the Oxford Institute for Economic Policy (OXONIA). He also chairs Quadrivio Group, one of the largest investment firms in Italy.

== Positions ==
=== Current Academic Positions ===
- Professor of Economics, Dept. of Economics, Guglielmo Marconi University, Rome
- Co-Director, Special program on Geopolitics and Geopolitical Economy and Finance of the Ph.D. Program on Social Science, Guglielmo Marconi University, Rome
- Member, Academic and Policy Board, The Oxford Institute for Economic Policy (OXONIA), Oxford, UK

=== Past Academic Positions ===
- Ohio State University (1980-1981)
- University of Delaware - Disaster Research Center (1986–1987)
- ISIG, Gorizia (1977–1989)
- University of Trieste (1978–1980, 1984–1988)
- LUISS, Rome (1989–1993)
- University of Bologna-Forlì (1995)
- John Cabot University, Rome (1998, 2004)
- University of Georgia, School of Public and International Affairs, (1982–1986, 1988–2016)
- Co-Director, GLOBIS, Center for the Study of Global Issues, University of Georgia (1992–2016)
- Guglielmo Marconi University, Rome (2009–present)

=== Institutional and Advisory Positions ===
- Fellow, Strategic Forum, Ministry of Foreign Affairs, Rome (2008-2015)
- Adviser, Consip, Rome (2006–2011)
- Adviser to the Italian Minister of Defense (A. Martino), Rome (2001–2006)
- Expert, High Council, Ministry of Communications, Rome (1999–2006)
- Coordinator of the White Paper, Repubblica e Canton Ticino, Bellinzona (1997–1998)
- Adviser to the Italian Minister of Finance (G. Tremonti), Rome (1994)
- Adviser to the Italian Minister of Foreign Affairs (B. Andreatta), Rome (1993)
- Consultant, Committee for the Evaluation of the Budget, Ministry of Treasury, Rome (1993)
- Consultant, Supreme Council of Defense, Rome (1991-1992)
- Adviser to the President of the Italian Republic (F. Cossiga), Rome (1990–1991)
- Director of Research Projects, Military Center for Strategic Studies, CASD, Rome (1988–1996)
- Scientific Adviser to the UN Secretary General in reference to the projects of the International Decade for Natural Disaster Reduction (IDNDR, New York and Geneva (1988–1990)
- Director, Strategic Project ARAMIS, National Research Council, Rome (1985-1988)

=== Business ===
- Vice Chairman & Strategist, Quadrivio Group (Holding), Luxembourg (2018–present)
- Chairman, Quadrivio Group, Milano, (2010–2017)
- Director, Quadrivio Capital Sgr, Milano, (2013–2018)
- Director, Futura Invest, Milano, (2015–2019)
- President and CEO, Stratematica, Verona, (2010–present)
- Consultant, Finmeccanica, Rome (2007-2012)
- Consultant, Rolls-Royce, London and Rome (2007-2011)

== Publications ==
=== Managing Discontinuity: A Futuristic Dialogue between the Entrepreneur and the Professor, 2025 ===
The book includes the transcript of a dialogue between Giordano Riello and Carlo Pelanda that took place in the first half of 2025. The focus was on framing the different historical discontinuities currently happening or potentially coming, with the aim of finding adaptive and innovative solutions for entrepreneurs and the requisite evolution that companies and the thinking of industrialists must undergo. The topics discussed were: the changing world in terms of economic geopolitics, environmental policy, technological revolution, prioritizing industry and its relationship with investment finance, and the transformation of the Italian economic model to support mass capitalism. The dialogue focused on systemic innovative solutions.

=== Global Italy, The New Strategy, 2023 ===
The author argues for a new geopolitical strategy for Italy, where the global projection of influence is combined with an internal reconfiguration that supports it. The strategy is based on the idea that reversing the trend of Italy's decline can happen through the boost of a worldwide projection of Italy, with increasing international relevance and internal wealth through a forward-looking and ambitious adjustment of Italy's institutional, economic, and social system.

Pelanda argues that the projection of Italy must be put at the service of strengthening the alliance between democracies, which are struggling due to the lack of a self-sustaining model of mass-capitalism and due to the emergence of aggressive authoritarian powers in the world. Therefore, it is not about a "closed" nationalist strategy, but an "open" contributive one.

He argues it is the responsibility of Italy to take on more national strength to contribute to the strengthening and expansion of the global democratic complex. The realism of the project – which is probabilistic and not deterministic – is supported by an analysis of Italy's potential. The book aims to be a tool of 'cognitive power' to bring Italian strategic thinking, through the identification of a 'strategic vector,' from the passive stance of recent decades to an active one.

=== The Restoration of Democratic Capitalism, 2021 ===
Pelanda makes the case that all democracies are showing signs of crisis due to the regressive trend in mass capitalism. The data shows a tendency towards wealth inequality and an increase in poverty. This situation, net of crises and recoveries, appears to be caused by the inadequacy of national political-economic models. In Europe, there tends to be strong redistributive guarantees that stifle wealth creation. In the United States, the opportunity to engage in the mass capitalist system has a selection bias. Pelanda argues that innovation is needed in terms of these national welfare models.

He also argues there is the need for a restructuring of the political architecture of the international market that allows each democratic nation to gain wealth from its economic openness and for democracies to achieve a stable balance. The book contains specific proposals, in particular: the transition from redistributive welfare or welfare with insufficient guarantees to a new type of "investment welfare" adaptable to each democratic nation, and the creation of a global market with increasing integration among democracies.

This proposal for both domestic and international reform of democratic capitalist nations is based on a new principle of 'convergent and mutually contributive sovereignties.' The author suggests that these innovations, designed within a framework of geopolitical realism, could help repair democratic capitalism, restoring its mission of progressive mass wealth while also strengthening democracies challenged by authoritarian capitalism.

=== Strategy 2028, 2017 ===
In Strategy 2028, Pelanda argues that while the decline of Italy is evident, the strength of its industrial system and the dynamism prevalent throughout its society are a concrete basis for strategic hope in reversing the decline. He identifies four structural transformations required for this reversal:

- From Denationalization to a New National Project (dalla denazionalizzazione al nuovo progetto nazionale)
- From Dysfunction to Effective Governance (dall'ingoernabilità alla governabilità)
- From Passive to Active Welfare (dal welfare passivo a quello attivo)
- From Weak Sovereignty to Convergent and Contributory Sovereignty (dalla sovranità debole a quella convergente e contributiva)

The book introduces a systematic strategy that integrates internal reforms, of both the political architecture and economic model of Italy, with a project to strengthen Italy's external position.

Strategy 2028 is a 10-year project with milestone events that will reinforce the plan's feasibility in its early stages. It is a national project intended to repair Italian democracy in a global scenario of reorganizing and converging democracies.

=== Nova Pax, 2015 ===
In Nova Pax, Pelanda outlines a global systemic project that aims to: (a) create an alliance structured as an economic area with growing integration among democratic nations; (b) facilitate the reorganization of national political-economic models into structures compatible with the allied economic area; (c) form this new Free Community through the expansion of the G7; and (d) revive democratic ideology and restart the process of global democratization.

The goal is to reorganize the world of "democratic capitalism" through this strategy, which combines national reforms and a new international architecture. The model of "democratic capitalism" is facing a crisis in its ability to generate economic growth, maintain geopolitical cohesion, and project influence globally. The realism of the project is based on the tendency of democracies to form free trade agreements, at times even with elements of a common market. This systemic project seeks to encourage this trend and organize it as Nova Pax, a successor to Pax Americana and the foundation for a new world order.

=== Europe Beyond, 2013 ===
In Europe Beyond, Pelanda recognizes that the temptation is growing among certain nations to go beyond Europe because the EU and Eurozone are seen as dysfunctional. He argues that it would be more productive for Europe to reorganize itself with an outward focus so that it can become more useful for Europeans and the world. This new "post-European" innovation would treat Europe not as an end, but as the means to help stabilize and improve the global system. This extroverted posture would in turn resolve the internal defects that impair the European project today.

=== The New Progress, 2011 ===
Pelanda argues that progress, defined as continuous improvement in the human condition, is experiencing a crisis. Our system of democratic capitalism has proven most successful at fostering progress through the self-reinforcing virtuous cycle between freedom, capital, and technology. He argues that the system is now weakening, and progress is slowing.

The diffusion of wealth in the democratic capitalist system is in decline. Democracy shows signs of degeneration and its global spread is slowing or has stopped entirely. This deterioration occurred because the large abstractions and models that drove democratic capitalism in the past have not been updated and so no longer function.

Pelanda identifies seven missions in The New Progress to help restart the virtuous cycle between freedom, capital, and technology: (a) re-launch mass capitalism through new guarantees; (b) modernize and expand the democratic revolution; (c) give a vertical architecture to the global market; (d) search for a new synthesis in moral philosophy; (e) add to the philosophy of analysis that of building; (f) rebuild confidence in technical solutions; and (g) bring about the passage from weak to strong thinking.

=== Formula Italy: The New National Project, 2010 ===
Pelanda argues that the Risorgimento was a national and liberal project that is now in need of reinvention. His formula for this new national project identifies four transitions necessary to stave off crisis in the Italian national system: (a) from the de-nationalization of culture to positive patriotism; (b) from passive to active guarantees; (c) from weak to contributive sovereignty; and (d) from the horizontal to the vertical state.

=== The Grand Alliance, 2007 ===
Pelanda argues that the system of world governance built on U.S. dominance, the U.S. Dollar, and the Western nature of international institutions is breaking down. The United States is still the single most powerful country in the world but it is now too "small" to maintain its role as global governor as it has done since 1945. The world has become too big to be governed by one power.

Current trends show that divergent regional blocks and mega-nations are forming which will weaken the governance of the global economy and its security problems, increasing the risk of destabilization over the entire planet. In The Grand Alliance, Pelanda recommends a future alliance of the world’s largest democracies: the United States, European Union, Russia, India, and Japan. The gradual convergence of military and economic power within these nations will produce credible global governance based on Western and technical values.

=== Active Democracy, 2006 ===
Active Democracy outlines three purposes. The first is scientific, rationally evaluating the properties of democracy and the ability to spread it to nations of the world. The second is informational, synthesizing the materials useful to students, scholars, and political activists to deepen the concepts of democracy and democratization. The third is ideological, advocating global democratization in light of its usefulness and feasibility, not in the abstract.

=== Sovereignty & Confidence, 2005 (with Paolo Savona) ===
The state was designed to guarantee the rights of individuals belonging to a population with a common culture that resides in a territory limited by borders. The state is the sole guarantor of the rights in that territory and is therefore sovereign. In a globalized world, where events in the territory of one nation can dramatically impact what happens in another, the role of sovereignty comes into question. Liberal internationalists would argue that the state must transfer sovereignty to a supranational body. Hardcore nationalists would argue that you cannot alter the sovereignty of the nation-state. Pelanda and Savona argue for a balanced approach that re-imagines the role of national sovereignty in the context of prioritizing confidence.

Confidence is the idea that "the future will be better than today, in a global system that has a growing need for optimism to generate and diffuse wealth." They argue that a globalized system has emerged without the political architecture necessary to sustain it, and therefore, there is a confidence deficit. The resolution of planetary emergencies requires such a political architecture to facilitate cooperation among states and provide the necessary conditions to build confidence in the global system. Likewise, nations must de-emphasize internal forces of stability and take measures to build confidence in their societies.

Pelanda and Savona argue national sovereignty must be re-adapted to this new situation, not thinking that it is untouchable nor ceding all authority to a supranational body. They propose the development of new global standards and tools, which can facilitate the convergence of nations to manage crises and problems beyond the capabilities of their own intervention.

=== Futurization, 2003 ===
Pelanda describes the possible birth of an era where historical limits on human life and actions can be overcome. Anthropogenic dominance over matter, information and energy can lead to the elimination of biological and ecological constraints, as well as the political, social, cultural, and economic conditions that have hindered human progress.

Pelanda purports that, "there exists in our collective history the conscious desire for salvation and instinctive curiosity, which has driven motive and capability to overcome seemingly insurmountable barriers to progress. Hope — once reduced to mere reproduction and biological inheritance — now takes on operational and active qualities. There is possible an alliance between curiosity and improvement that can result in boldness and solution. This metaphysical chemistry leads to Futurization."

The book outlines seven missions to prepare for and initiate Futurization: (a) Strengthen the capitalist model; (b) Start the cognitive revolution; (c) Build the State of active guarantees; (d) Give the global market a propulsive political architecture; (e) Manage the technological revolution with strong and not weak thought; (f) Steer the artificial ecology; (g) Open the culture of humanism to evolutionary exo-destinies.

=== Sovereignty & Wealth, 2001 (with Paolo Savona) ===
In the 2001 book, Sovereignty & Wealth: How to fill the Vacuum of the Globalization, Pelanda and Savona argue that globalization was not fully realized (even a void) at the political level and that this state of affairs threatens globalization at the economic level. The almost total freedom of movement for capital without commensurate freedoms for goods and services introduces pressures to the global capitalist system and the democratic structures that sustain it. The role of nation-states in the re-institutionalization of the global market is to ensure economic competitiveness within their territory. Even more important, however, is cooperation among nations to build the political architecture of the global market that can govern the gap between the hyper-competitiveness of "turbocapitalism" and the organizing structures that sustain it.

The world of culture tends to rationalize frustrations over this gap rather than to propose solutions for its governance. Pelanda and Savona articulate a new concept of "balanced sovereignty" that simultaneously renews trust among citizens for the global project through enhanced national sovereignty and ensures the functioning of the international economic system through a new "global political function".

=== The Growth State, 2000 ===
Global capitalism is destroying old geoeconomic and geopolitical realities and creating new ones at a rate faster than governments can adapt. The diffusion of wealth in previous decades would therefore be interrupted by the consequences of these new geopolitical and geoeconomic realities for which governments are unprepared. The United States was able to lead a response or respond directly to these interruptions in the past. However, the global system has become too large of a regulatory responsibility for the American system alone. Without coordination of the European and American response, the world can expect future social and military crises.

In the 2000 book, Growth State: For a Global Alliance between State and Market, Pelanda proposes a new formulation of the state that performs more efficiently and effectively the mission of helping the majority of citizens have a good position in the market. As wealth inequality grows, polarizing the rich and poor and creating social conflict, the state can prioritize growth or protectionism. Protectionist and aggressive nationalist policies will only accentuate wealth inequality so therefore States have no option but to prioritize growth. The challenge of the growth formulation will be to capitalize each citizen and guarantee their access to technology while at the same time managing the ecological ad technological risks that will inevitably result. The necessity of this growth formulation to avert the deterioration of geopolitical and geoeconomic conditions means that the State must become more important not less, according to this new growth profile.
