= Commissione Nazionale per le Società e la Borsa =

Italian securities market regulator

Italian Companies and Exchange Commission
- Commissione Nazionale per le Società e la Borsa

Agency overview
- Formed: 1974; 52 years ago
- Jurisdiction: Italy
- Headquarters: Rome, Italy
- Agency executives: Paolo Savona, Chairman; Luca Giuseppe Filippa, General Director
- Website: https://www.consob.it

The Commissione Nazionale per le Società e la Borsa (CONSOB. Italian Companies and Exchange Commission) is the government authority of Italy responsible for regulating the Italian securities market. This includes the regulation of the Italian stock exchange, the Borsa Italiana. Although it is governed under a national framework of accountability, Consob increasingly implements policies set at the European Union level. It is a voting member of the Board of Supervisors of the European Securities and Markets Authority (ESMA). It is also a member of the European Systemic Risk Board (ESRB).

== History ==
The Italian Companies and Exchange Commission (CONSOB) was founded in 1974 through legislation merging the functions and jurisdictions that until then had been part of the Italian Ministry of Treasury. This was primarily power to monitor the securities markets. Over time, CONSOB's powers and responsibilities have expanded significantly. In 1983, a new law extended its jurisdiction to protecting public savings, and two years later CONSOB received juridical personality and autonomy. In 1991, it was attributed powers to audit securities brokerage companies and monitor insider trading, thanks in part to the contributions of members of Consob’s leadership, including President Guido Rossi and Giuseppe Zadra, Head of the Markets Division.

== Responsibilities and functions ==
CONSOB carries out several functions:

- it regulates the investment services and operations of intermediaries, the reporting obligations of companies listed on regulated markets, and the solicitation of investment from the public;
- it authorizes the operations of regulated markets, the publication of prospectuses, the centralized management of financial instruments, and enrolment in registers;
- it monitors the operations of market management companies, the transparency and orderly conduct of trading, and the transparency and fairness of the conduct of intermediaries and financial representatives;
- it penalizes any unfair conduct by the above-mentioned parties; and
- it checks the information provided to the market by entities that solicit investment from the public, as well as the information contained in the accounting documents of listed companies.

== Organisation structure ==
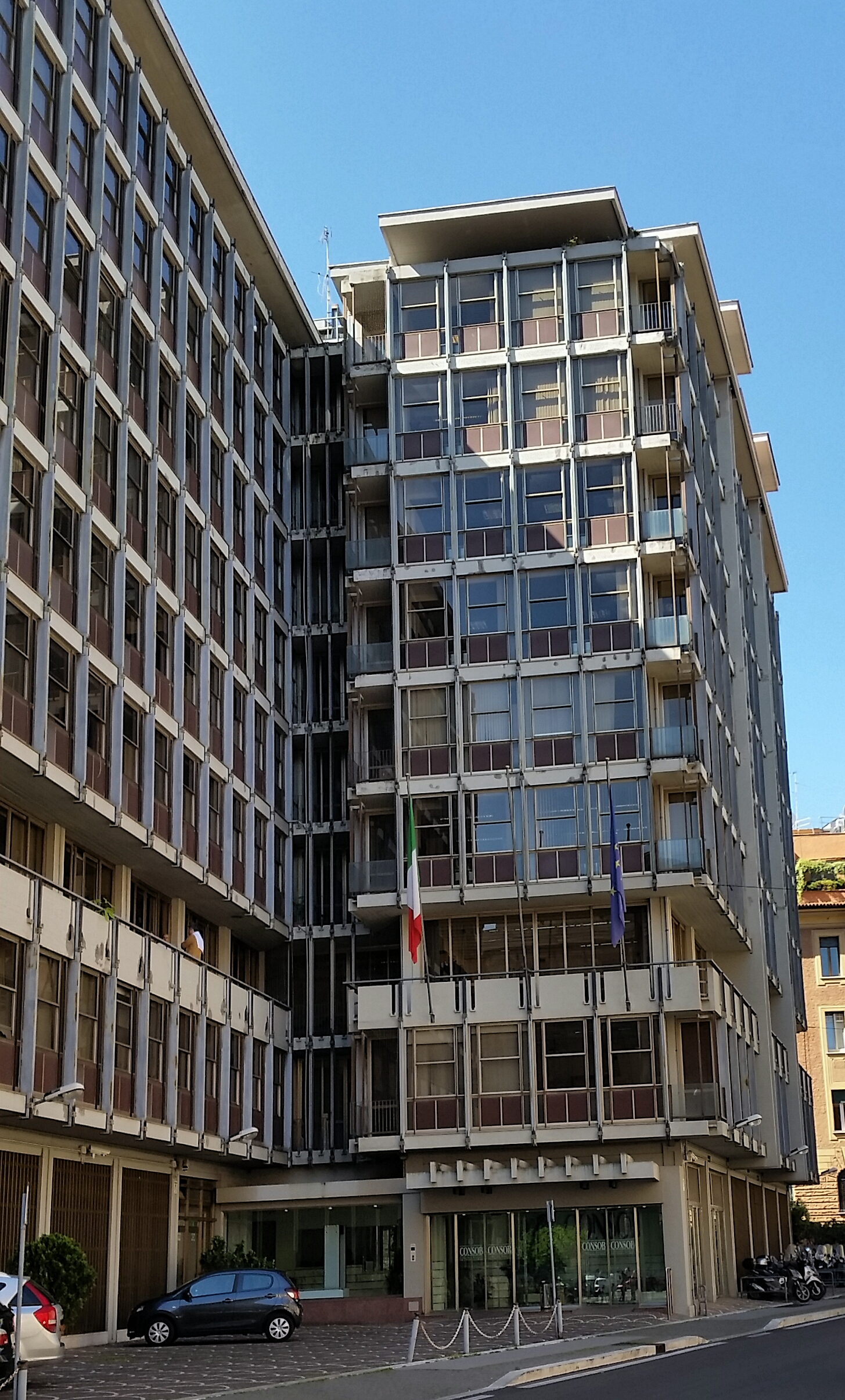
CONSOB headquarters in Rome

CONSOB is headed by a collegiate body consisting of a chairman (as of November 2019 Paolo Savona; his predecessors include Mario Nava, Giuseppe Vegas, Lamberto Cardia, Luigi Spaventa, Enzo Berlanda, and Franco Piga) and four members, appointed by a decree of the president of the Republic on the proposal of the President of the Council of Ministers, who remain in office for seven years and their term is non-renewable. The organizational structure includes a central management committee under which there are eleven departments (issuers, intermediaries, markets, etc.) and thirty-nine divisions (company controls, public tender offers and ownership structure, financial representatives monitoring and register, insider trading, derivatives markets, etc.), with offices in Rome and Milan.

== Leadership ==
- Gastone Miconi (1975–1980)
- Guido Rossi (1981–1982)
- Vincenzo Milazzo (1983–1984)
- Franco Piga (1984–1990)
- Bruno Pazzi (1990–1992)
- Enzo Berlanda (1992–1997)
- Tommaso Padoa-Schioppa (1997–1998)
- Luigi Spaventa (May 1998 – June 2003)
- Lamberto Cardia (June 2003 – November 2010)
- Giuseppe Vegas (December 2010 – December 2017)
- Mario Nava (April–September 2018)
- Paolo Savona (since March 2019)

== See also ==
- List of financial supervisory authorities by country
- Securities Commission
