= Luigi Spaventa =

Italian economist and politician (1934–2013)

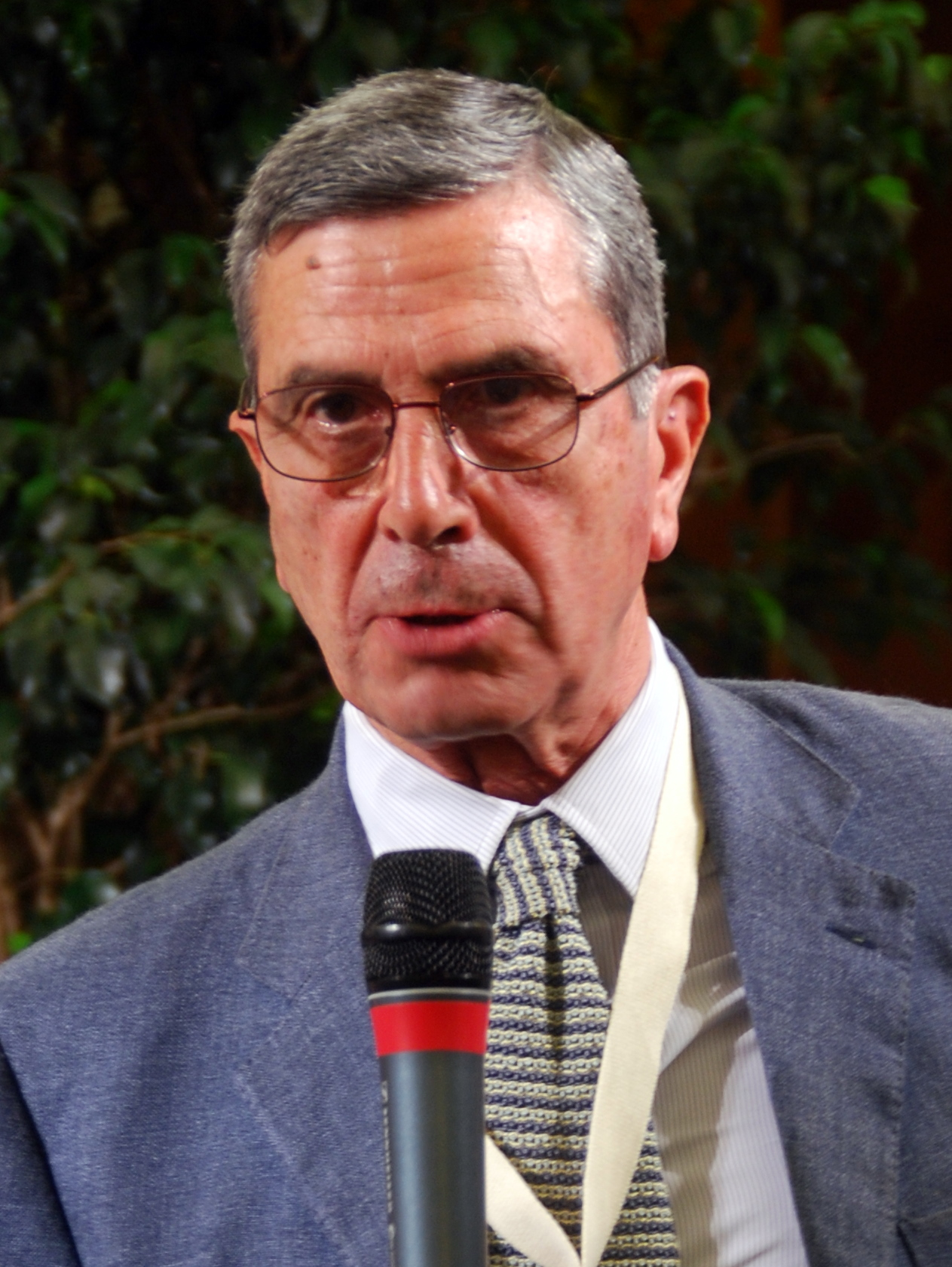

Minister of Budget
- In office 28 April 1993 – May 1994
- Prime Minister: Carlo Azeglio Ciampi

Minister of Treasury
- In office 1988–1989

Personal details
- Born: 5 March 1934 Rome, Kingdom of Italy
- Died: 6 January 2013 (aged 78) Rome, Italy
- Party: Independent Left
- Education: Sapienza University of Rome

Luigi Spaventa (5 March 1934 – 6 January 2013) was an Italian politician and academic. He served as a cabinet minister at different Italian governments. He was a member of the Italian Parliament from 1976 to 1983.

== Early life and education ==
Spaventa was born in Rome on 5 March 1934. In 1957 he received a law degree from the Sapienza University of Rome.

== Career ==
Following graduation Spaventa worked as a visiting scholar at Oxford University, the International Monetary Fund and at Cornell University. Then he returned to Italy and was a professor of economics at several universities, including Palermo University and Perugia University. Next he became a faculty member and professor of economics at the Sapienza University of Rome.

In 1976, he was elected to the Italian Parliament and served there until 1983. He was an independent deputy with the Communist Party. In 1981 he involved in the establishment of Centro Europa Ricerche, a research center in Rome, along with Giorgio Ruffolo. Spaventa was the minister of treasury from 1988 to 1989 and the minister of budget from 1993 to 1994. In the latter post he was part of the cabinet led by Prime Minister Carlo Azeglio Ciampi and was close to the Democratic Party of the Left. From 1988 to 1989 Spaventa served as the chairman of the scientific consulting for the management of the public debt formed by the Italian treasury. From 1992 to 1993 he was the coordinator of the council of experts at the general department of treasury.

He ran for a parliament seat from Rome in the 1994 elections but did not win. He was part of the Democratic Alliance during this period. In 1994, he became a member of the editorial board of the journals, Moneta e Credito and Banca Nazionale del Lavoro Quarterly Review. He served as the chairman of Banca Monte dei Paschi di Siena from 1997 to 1998. From 1998 to 2003 he was the chairman of the Commissione Nazionale per le Societa e la Borsa or CONSOB, the Italian public authority responsible for regulating the Italian securities market.

Later he was promoted to the title Professor Emeritus at the Sapienza University of Rome. He was the co-founder of CER, the Centro Europa Ricerche. He was also a board member of Banca Nazionale del Lavoro. He wrote for Italian newspapers La Repubblica and Corriere della Sera. He was a member of the Trustees of the International Financial Reporting Standards Foundation from 2008 to July 2010 when he retired from the post.

Spaventa was named as the non-executive vice chairman of the board of Banca Profilo SpA on 8 June 2009. In addition, he also served as the chairman of the board of Sator SpA to which he was appointed in 2007 and of MTS SpA. His other posts include research fellow of the Centre for Economic Policy Research, based in London, member of the steering committee of the Euro 50 Group and a member of the “Group of Wise Men”, appointed by European ECOFIN on the regulation of European securities markets.

== Personal life and death ==
In 1962 Spaventa married a British woman, Clare Royce, an economist to whom he had been introduced by Amartya Sen. They had three children. He died in Rome on 6 January 2013 at the age of 78 after a long illness.
