= Carlo Azeglio Ciampi =

President of Italy from 1999 to 2006

Carlo Azeglio Ciampi OMRI
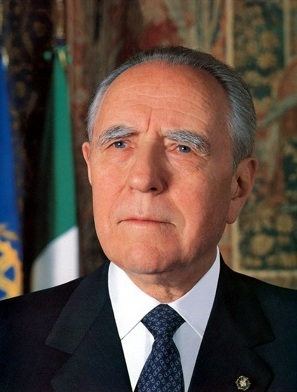
- Official portrait, 1999

President of Italy
- In office 18 May 1999 – 15 May 2006
- Prime Minister: Massimo D'Alema; Giuliano Amato; Silvio Berlusconi
- Preceded by: Oscar Luigi Scalfaro
- Succeeded by: Giorgio Napolitano

Prime Minister of Italy
- In office 29 April 1993 – 11 May 1994
- President: Oscar Luigi Scalfaro
- Preceded by: Giuliano Amato
- Succeeded by: Silvio Berlusconi

Minister of Treasury, Budget and Economic Programming
- In office 18 May 1996 – 13 May 1999
- Prime Minister: Romano Prodi; Massimo D'Alema
- Preceded by: Lamberto Dini (Treasury); Mario Arcelli (Budget)
- Succeeded by: Giuliano Amato

Minister of the Interior
- In office 19 April 1994 – 10 May 1994
- Prime Minister: Himself
- Preceded by: Nicola Mancino
- Succeeded by: Roberto Maroni

Minister of Tourism and Entertainment
- In office 28 April 1993 – 10 May 1994
- Prime Minister: Himself
- Preceded by: Margherita Boniver
- Succeeded by: Domenico Fisichella

Governor of the Bank of Italy
- In office 8 October 1979 – 29 April 1993
- Preceded by: Paolo Baffi
- Succeeded by: Antonio Fazio

Director General of the Bank of Italy
- In office 28 June 1978 – 8 October 1979
- Preceded by: Mario Ercolani
- Succeeded by: Lamberto Dini

Member of the Senate of the Republic
- Life tenure 15 May 2006 – 16 September 2016
- Status: Ex officio

Personal details
- Born: 9 December 1920 Livorno, Tuscany, Kingdom of Italy
- Died: 16 September 2016 (aged 95) Rome, Lazio, Italy
- Party: PdA (1943–1947); Independent (1947–2016)
- Height: 1.63 m (5 ft 4 in)
- Spouse: Franca Pilla (m. 1946)
- Children: 2
- Education: Scuola Normale of Pisa
- Profession: Economist; civil servant

Military service
- Allegiance: Kingdom of Italy
- Branch/service: Royal Italian Army
- Years of service: 1941-1944
- Rank: Sub-lieutenant

Carlo Azeglio Ciampi (Italian: [ˈkarlo adˈdzeʎʎo ˈtʃampi]; 9 December 1920 – 16 September 2016) was an Italian politician, statesman and banker who was the president of Italy from 1999 to 2006 and prime minister of Italy from 1993 to 1994.

A World War II veteran, Ciampi had fought for the Italian resistance movement after he evaded capture from the Wehrmacht in 1943. Afterwards, he became a prominent banker in the First Italian Republic, gradually rising in the ranks of the Bank of Italy before becoming its governor in 1979. In his tenure as governor, the Italian lira was devalued amid conflict with Prime Minister Bettino Craxi in the mid-1980s, and Italy withdrew from the European Monetary System in 1992. Besides his political career, he held numerous intergovernmental positions, including as Chairman of the Interim Committee of the International Monetary Fund from 1998 to 1999.

Following the Tangentopoli scandal that precipitated the collapse of the First Republic, Ciampi, who was politically independent, was asked to become Prime Minister by President Oscar Luigi Scalfaro in April 1993, which he accepted. His short tenure was mainly characterised by addressing political corruption uncovered by Tangentopoli, before Silvio Berlusconi's win in the 1994 election ushered in the Second Republic. He would then serve as Minister of the Treasury from 1996 to 1999 in the First Prodi and First D'Alema governments during the country's transition into the eurozone, for which he chose Leonardo da Vinci's Vitruvian Man for the design of the one euro coin.

Ciampi succeeded Scalfaro as President of Italy in the 1999 Italian presidential election, and held the office for seven years until his resignation in May 2006. His broad, unifying rhetoric and non–interventionist role as head of state meant he retained the role's largely ceremonial powers. However, his relationship with Berlusconi in the latter's second and third governments was often strained, publicly opposing Italian military involvement in the Iraq War in 2003 and opposing Berlusconi regarding the resignation of Minister of Foreign Affairs Renato Ruggiero in 2002. He enjoyed high approval ratings by the Italian public throughout his presidency and was well regarded in Italian politics, but chose not to run for re–election in 2006, and was succeeded by Giorgio Napolitano, whose interventionist approach shifted the role of the Presidency.

Following his resignation, he served as Senator until his death in 2016 at the age of 95, being the only living former Italian President and the oldest head of state from Europe and the second oldest in the world.

== Background ==
=== Early life and education ===
Ciampi was born in Livorno on 9 December 1920, to Pietro Ciampi, an optician, and his wife, Marie (née Masino). He received a B.A. in ancient Greek literature and classical philology in 1941 from the Scuola Normale Superiore di Pisa, one of the country's most prestigious universities, defending a thesis, entitled Favorino d'Arelate e la consolazione Περὶ φυγῆς, under the direction of the Hellenist Augusto Mancini. He had also studied literature in Leipzig University from 1940-1941 and would receive an honorary doctorate from Leipzig University in 2001. In 1941, he was called to military duty in Albania as a lieutenant. On 8 September 1943, on the date of the armistice with the Allies, he refused to remain in the Fascist Italian Social Republic, and took refuge in Abruzzo, in Scanno. He subsequently managed to pass the lines and reach Bari, where he joined the Partito d'Azione and thus the Italian resistance movement. In 1946 he married Franca Pilla. That same year, he obtained a B.A. in law from the University of Pisa and began working at the Banca d'Italia. He also joined the CGIL (Trade Union), which he left in 1980.

=== Bank of Italy ===
In 1960, he was called to work in the central administration of the Bank of Italy, where he became Secretary General in 1973, Vice Director General in 1976, and Director General in 1978. In October 1979, he was nominated Governor of the Bank of Italy and President of the national Bureau de Change, positions he filled until 1993.

=== Political career ===
Ciampi was the first non-parliamentarian prime minister of Italy in more than 100 years. From April 1993 to May 1994 he oversaw a technical government. Later, as treasury minister from 1996 to May 1999 in the governments of Romano Prodi and Massimo D'Alema, he was credited with adopting the euro currency. He chose the Italian design for the 1-euro coin, whereas all others were left to a television vote among some candidates the ministry had prepared. Ciampi chose the Vitruvian Man of Leonardo da Vinci, on the symbolic grounds that it represented man as a measure of all things, and in particular of the coin: in this perspective, money was at the service of man, instead of its opposite. The design also fitted very well on the bimetallic material of the coin.

According to the Italian weekly Famiglia Cristiana, in 1993 Ciampi was a member of the regular Masonic Lodge "Hermes" of Livorno, which was affiliated with the Grand Orient of Italy and linked to the Rito Filosofico Italiano.

== President (1999–2006) ==
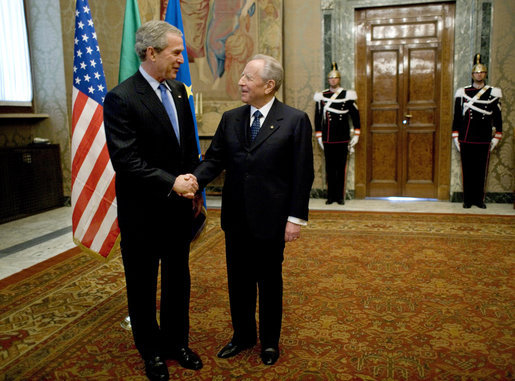
Ciampi meets U.S. President George W. Bush at the Quirinale Palace, 7 April 2005

Ciampi was elected with a broad majority, and was the second president ever to be elected at the first ballot (when there is a requirement of a two-thirds majority) in a joint session of the Chamber of Deputies, the Italian Senate and representatives of the Regions. He usually refrained from intervening directly in the political debate while serving as president. He often addressed general issues, without mentioning their connection to the current political debate, in order to state his opinion without being too intrusive. His interventions frequently stressed the need for all parties to respect the Constitution and observe the proprieties of political debate. He was generally held in high regard by all political forces represented in the parliament.

The possibility of persuading Ciampi to stand for a second term as president by the election 2006 – the so-called Ciampi-bis – was widely discussed, despite his advancing age, but it was officially dismissed by Ciampi himself on 3 May 2006: "None of the past nine presidents of the Republic has been re-elected. I think this has become a meaningful rule. It is better not to infringe it". Ciampi, whose mandate was due to expire on the 18th, resigned on the 15th. His successor, Giorgio Napolitano, took the oath on the same day.

As head of state of the host country, he officially declared the 2006 Winter Olympics open on 10 February 2006. As president, Ciampi was not considered to be close to the positions of the Vatican and the Catholic Church, in a sort of alternate after the devout Oscar Luigi Scalfaro. He often praised patriotism, not always a common feeling because of its abuse by the Italian Fascist regime.

== Death ==
He died in Rome on 16 September 2016 at the age of 95. His funeral was officiated at the Church of San Saturnino in Rome on 19 September by Archbishop Vincenzo Paglia. A national day of mourning was proclaimed on the same day and flags were flown at half-mast.

== Awards and honours ==
As President of the Italian Republic between 18 May 1999 and 15 May 2006, Ciampi held the roles of:

- Head of the Order of Merit of the Italian Republic
- Chief of the Military Order of Italy
- Head of the Order of Merit for Labour
- Head of the Order of the Star of Italian Solidarity
- Head of the Order of Vittorio Veneto
- Bailiff Grand Cross of Honour and Devotion of the Sovereign Military Order of Malta
- Collar of the Order of Pius IX (Papal Order)
- 1982: Great Cross of the Order of Merit of the Italian Republic
- 1985: – Commander of the Legion of Honour (France)
- 1986: – Great Cross of Merit of the Federal Republic of Germany
- 1991: Honorary degree, University of Pavia
- 1993: – Grand Cordon of the Order of the Rising Sun (Japan)
- 1995: Freeman of the City of Naples
- 1999: – Collar of the Order of the White Rose (Finland)
- 2000: Gold Medal of the Jean Monnet Foundation for Europe
- 2000: – Knight Grand Cross of the Order of the Bath (United Kingdom, 16 October 2000)
- 2000: – Knight Grand Cross of the Order of the White Eagle (Poland)
- 2001: (Norway) – Knight Grand Cross of the Royal Norwegian Order of St. Olav
- 2001: Medal of the Oriental Republic of Uruguay.
- 2001: (Croatia) – Grand Cross of the Grand Order of King Tomislav (19 October 2001)
- 2001: Honorary doctorate from the University of Leipzig Faculty of Economics
- 2002: – Grand Star of Honour for Services to the Republic of Austria
- 2002: – Grand Cross (or 1st Class) of the Order of the White Double Cross (Slovakia)
- 2002: – Grand Collar of the Order of Prince Henry (Portugal, 22 February 2002)
- 2002: (Hungary) – Grand Cross with Collar of the Order of Merit of the Hungarian Republic
- 2002: – Collar Pro Merito Melitensi of the Sovereign Military Order of Malta
- 2003: – Collar of the Order of the Star of Romania
- 2003: – Honorary Recipient of the Order of the Crown of the Realm (Malaysia)
- 2004: – Collar of the Order of the Cross of Terra Mariana (Estonia)
- 2004: – Commander Grand Cross with Chain of the Order of Three Stars (Latvia)
- (Malta, 19 May 2005) Honorary Member of the Xirka Ġieħ ir-Repubblika
- 2005: Charlemagne Prize
- 2005: – Grand Cross of the Order of Saint-Charles (Monaco, 13 December 2005)
- March 2005: honorary Doctor of Civil Law degree form the Oxford University
- – Grand Cross of the Order of the Southern Cross (Brazil)
- 2008: Honorary doctorate from the Economics Faculty of the University of Augsburg
- 15 June 2005: honorary doctorate by the École Normale Supérieure of Paris.

== See also ==
- Delors Committee

Government offices
Preceded by Mario Ercolani	Deputy Director General of the Bank of Italy; 1976–1978	Succeeded by Alfredo Persiani Acerbo
Preceded by Mario Ercolani	Director General of the Bank of Italy; 1978–1979	Succeeded by Lamberto Dini
Preceded by Paolo Baffi	Governor of the Bank of Italy; 1979–1993	Succeeded by Antonio Fazio
Political offices
Preceded by Giuliano Amato	Prime Minister of Italy; 1993–1994	Succeeded by Silvio Berlusconi
Preceded by Lamberto Dini as Minister of Treasury	Minister of Treasury and Budget; 1996–1999	Succeeded by Giuliano Amato
Preceded by Mario Arcelli as Minister of Budget	Minister of Treasury and Budget; 1996–1999	Succeeded by Giuliano Amato
Preceded by Oscar Luigi Scalfaro	President of Italy; 1999–2006	Succeeded by Giorgio Napolitano
Awards
Preceded by Pat Cox	Laureate of the Charlemagne Prize; 2005	Succeeded by Jean-Claude Juncker
Preceded by Pope John Paul II	Laureate of the Charlemagne Prize; 2005	Succeeded by Jean-Claude Juncker
