= Filippo Carli =

Italian sociologist and fascist economist (1876–1938)

Filippo Carli (8 March 1876 – 27 May 1938) was an Italian sociologist and fascist economist. After graduating in law in 1916, he was appointed as secretary of the Chamber of Commerce of Brescia. He retained this post until 1928 meanwhile studying sociology and economic history. He went on to teach at the universities of Cagliari and Pisa.

As an Italian nationalist, Carli opposed both liberalism and socialism, and became a leading theorist of the corporate state with Premesse di economia corporativa (1929) and Le basi storiche e dottrinali dell'economia corporativa (1938). His son Guido Carli became a prominent Italian banker.

== Works ==
- Il fondamento razionale del dovere degli stati di abolire la guerra, Bologna, Libreria internazionale Treves di L. Beltrami, 1900.
- Nazionalismo economico, Milano, Tip. La Stampa Commerciale, 1911.
- Il problema dell'insegnamento professionale, Camera di commercio ed industria della provincia di Brescia, Brescia, Pea, 1915.
- La ricchezza e la guerra, Milano, Fratelli Treves editori, 1915.
- Gli imperialismi in conflitto e la loro psicologia economica, Brescia, Tip. Ed. Pea, 1915.
- L' altra guerra, Milano, Fratelli Treves editori, 1916.
- Problemi e possibilità del dopo-guerra nella provincia di Brescia, Brescia, Stab. tip. F. Apollonio & C. Comprende:

1. Camera di commercio ed industria, Brescia, 1916.
2. Inchiesta sui salari nel 1915 e 1916, 1917.
3. Inchiesta sul capitale e sulla tecnica, 1917.

- La partecipazione degli operai alle imprese, Brescia, Stab. tip. F. Apollonio & C., 1918.
- Le esportazioni, Milano, Treves, 1921.
- Dopo il nazionalismo : Problemi nazionali e sociali, Bologna-Rocca S. Casciano, Cappelli, 1922.
- Introduzione alla sociologia generale, Bologna, Zanichelli, 1925.
- Le teorie sociologiche, Scuola di scienze politiche e sociali della R. Universita di Padova, Padova, CEDAM, 1925.
- Premesse di economia corporativa, Pisa, Nistri-Lischi Editori, 1929.
- Teoria generale della economia politica nazionale, preface by Giuseppe Bottai, Milano, Hoepli, 1931.
- Saggi di storia economico-sociale, Pisa, Nistri-Lischi, 1932.
- Storia del commercio italiano, Padova, Cedam. Comprende:

1. Il mercato nell'alto Medio Evo, 1934
2. Il mercato nell'età del comune, 1936

- Le basi storiche e dottrinali dell'economia corporativa, Padova, Cedam, 1938.
