= Rainer Masera =

Italian economist and politician (born 1944)

Minister of Budget and Economic Planning
- In office 1995–1996
- Prime Minister: Lamberto Dini

Personal details
- Born: 6 May 1944 (age 82) Como, Kingdom of Italy
- Party: Independent
- Education: University of Oxford

Rainer Masera (born 6 May 1944) is an Italian academic and economist. He was the minister of budget and economic planning from 1995 to 1996.

== Biography ==
Masera was born in Como on 6 May 1944. He received a PhD in economics from the University of Oxford. Without being a member of any political party Masera served as the minister of budget and economic planning in the cabinet led by Prime Minister Lamberto Dini between 17 January 1995 and 11 January 1996. He served in different posts in the state and private institutions, including board member of the Bank for International Settlements, member of G10 Deputies, central director of the Bank of Italy, chief executive officer and chairman of Sanpaolo IMI Group and of RFI SpA and expert board member of the European Investment Bank.

Masera is a faculty member at Università degli Studi Guglielmo Marconi in Rome and the dean of the school of business. He has published several articles and a book.

=== Awards ===
In 1996 Masera was awarded Cavaliere di Gran Croce of Italy, and in 2002 he was named Cavaliere del Lavoro. In 2003 he was appointed Officier of the Légion d'honneur.
