= Sandro Gerbi =

Italian journalist

Alessandro Gerbi, known as Sandro (born October 3, 1943 in Lima, Peru) is an Italian journalist, author of several biographies and books on Italian contemporary history.

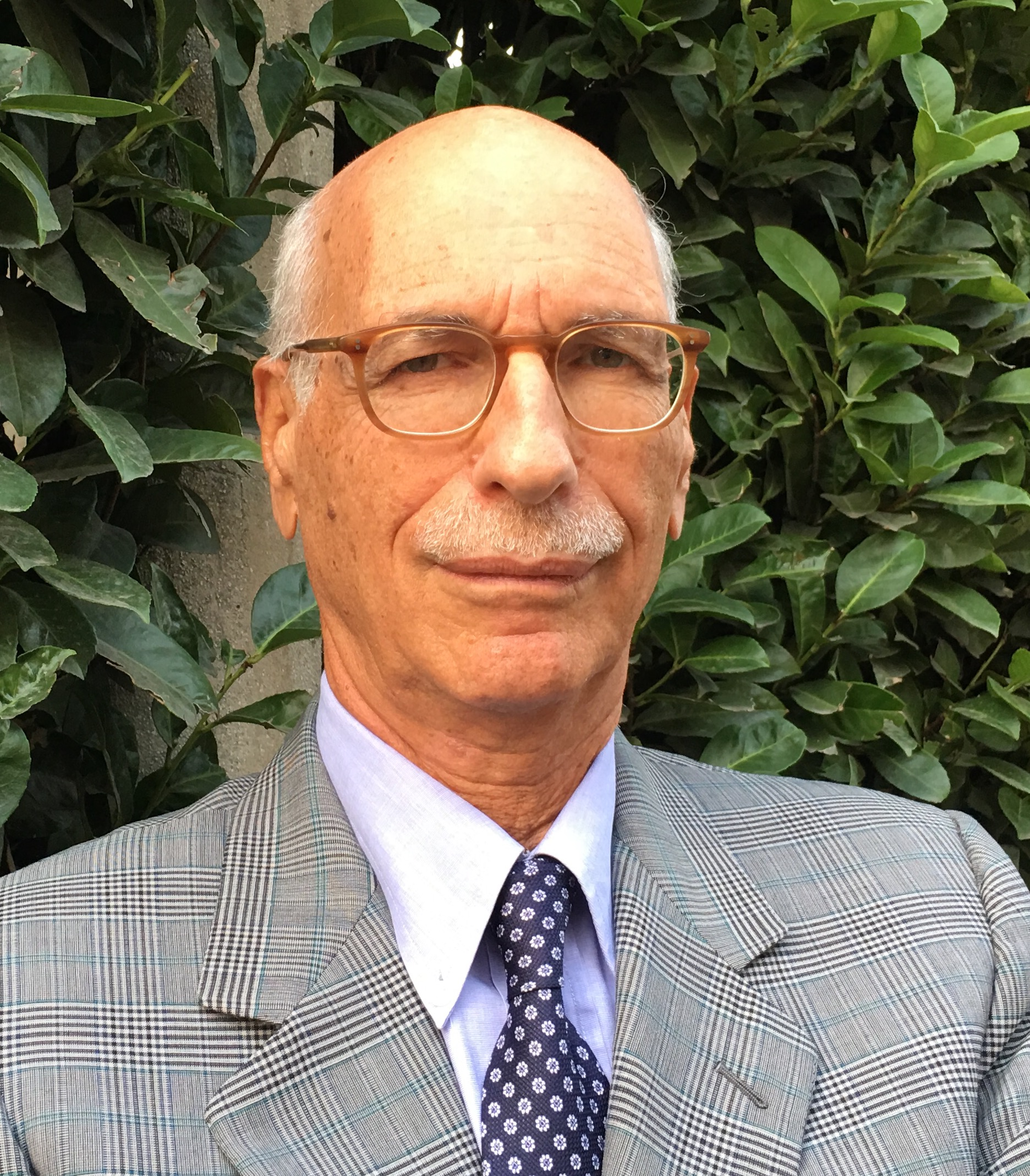
Sandro Gerbi

== Biography ==
Sandro Gerbi was born in Peru because his father Antonello (1904-1976), who at the time was senior economist of Banca Commerciale Italiana, had been transferred there in 1938 by his boss, Raffaele Mattioli. As a matter of fact, Antonello was in the verge of being dismissed from his job as a consequence of Italian racial laws (against people of Jewish origins). Antonello, in 1940, married his Viennese girlfriend, Herma Schimmerling (1912-2012), who had joined him in Lima. They had two children: Daniele (b. 1941) and Sandro (b. 1943). In the spring of 1948, the Gerbi family returned to Milan, where Sandro completed his secondary education (at the Liceo Classico "A. Manzoni”), and later (1967) obtained a law degree from the local Università degli Studi (University of Milan). Sandro Gerbi was first employed (in 1968) at Banca Italo-Israeliana in Milan, and subsequently spent 6 months in the United States at Underwood Typewriter Company (as an intern) and Southern Methodist University (attending a summer course in International Law). By the end of 1969 he was hired by Scandellari-Ventura-Lanella, a Milan stockbrokers firm, as an assistant to prominent journalist and financial expert Renato Cantoni (1916-1987). It was Cantoni, at the time a regular contributor to the Italian daily papers, Il Sole 24 Ore (Milan) and La Stampa (Turin), who introduced him to the world of journalism.

In 1971, Gerbi began collaborating with the weekly Il Mondo writing articles about financial affairs until 1975. Between 1976 and 1978 he was a financial commentator on the radio news program GR1, directed by Sergio Zavoli. In 1977, he became a full-time reporter for the daily newspaper Il Giorno (Milan) for a year and a half. After leaving his position there, Gerbi started working as a freelance financial journalist. He ran Il Giorno weekly column about the Milan Stock Exchange for over 15 years, and founded and ran from 1978 to 1987 the lettera SIGE, a monthly publication covering the financial markets.

Then, in 1990, came his professional turning point. Gerbi went from covering financial matters to contemporary history, a special area of interest of his which he had not pursued previously. This change happened when Gaetano Scardocchia, then editor of La Stampa, read an essay by Gerbi about the Italian historian Robert S. Lopez at the Voice of America during the war (subsequently Lopez was a Professor of Medieval History at Yale) and invited Gerbi to write for La Stampa's cultural pages. In 1993, Gerbi moved to another national newspaper, Il Corriere della Sera, until 2000. Then came a nine-year collaboration with Il Sole 24 Ore Sunday cultural supplement, followed by another three years working for Il Corriere again.

In 2012 Gerbi officially retired as a journalist to pursue a career only as a book author. In fact, he had already started working in the field of non-fiction when, thirty years earlier, he had edited his father's most famous work, La disputa del Nuovo Mondo (Ricciardi, 1983; reprint Adelphi, 2000), under the guidance of Gianni Antonini, editorial director at the publishing house Ricciardi. He later worked on more of his father’s works, including monographs and essay collections (see below).

Gerbi’s work as an author — which began quite late, at the age of 55 — is characterized by a special passion for extensive archival research: he likes to write biographical essays, and parallel biographies (with two characters examined together). He has a particular interest in fascism and the problems that arise within the relationship between intellectuals and politics, especially in times of dictatorship. He still enjoys writing occasionally about economic and financial history.

His books with the publishing house Einaudi include: in 1999, Tempi di malafede (winner of the Comisso Award in 2000), a story about the thwarted friendship between the writer Guido Piovene and the antifascist philosopher Eugenio Colorni; in 2002, Raffaele Mattioli e il filosofo domato (the “tamed philosopher” being Antonello Gerbi); in 2006 and 2009, together with Raffaele Liucci, a two-volume biography about famous Italian journalist Indro Montanelli; in 2011, an essay called Mattioli e Cuccia. Due banchieri del Novecento.

His publications with the publishing house Hoepli include: in 2013, Giovanni Enriques, dalla Olivetti alla Zanichelli (winner of the Biella Award in 2014); in 2016, I Cosattini. Una famiglia antifascista di Udine (winner of the Matteotti Award in 2017). With Hoepli, Gerbi also published a couple of second editions of books previously written, such as Tempi di malafede in 2012 and the Indro Montanelli biography, Raffaele Mattioli e il filosofo domato, in one sole volume in 2017. In 2009 he wrote the banker Antonio Foglia’s (1891-1957) biography, in a private edition.

Over this period of time, Gerbi has edited, sometimes in collaboration with other professionals, various collections of essays or of newspaper articles for the publisher Nino Aragno (including works by Enzo Forcella, Alessandro Galante Garrone, Orio Vergani, Bruno Visentini, Antonello Gerbi, Enrico Cuccia, Paolo Baffi, Guido Piovene, Giovanni Malagodi, and Giorgio Ambrosoli). Again for Aragno, in 2026 he edited – together with Francesca Pino – a two volume edition of banker Raffaele Mattioli’s Annual Reports (1945-1971).

Between 1991 and 2006, Gerbi published several essays in the literary magazine Belfagor, as well as penning various entries for the Dictionary of Fascism (Einaudi, 2005), edited by Victoria de Grazia and Sergio Luzzatto.

His autobiographical research on the secularization of the Gerbi family has led to the 2019 publication of his book Ebrei riluttanti (Hoepli), which in 2020 has been translated into English by Jeremy Moyle as Reluctant Jews, published by Centro Primo Levi Editions in New York City.

In September 2021 it was the turn of La voce d’oro di Mussolini. Storia di Lisa Sergio, la donna che visse tre volte (Neri Pozza). This book tells the adventurous story of fascist broadcaster Lisa Sergio (1905-1989), who in 1937 moved from Italy to the United States and slowly embraced democratic principles. In 2026 the same book, but enlarged, has been translated into English with the title of The Golden Voice of Mussolini and Roosevelt. Radio Journalist Lisa Sergio (Palgrave MacMillan).

Il selvaggio dell’Orinoco sulle orme del padre was published by Hoepli in January 2023. In this second autobiographic book (after Reluctant Jews), Gerbi recounts the complex intellectual relation between himself and his father Antonello Gerbi, well-known historian of ideas.

In 1983 Sandro Gerbi married Margherita Dezi, a former teacher from Abruzzi. They have two children: Martina (b. 1984) who is a classical dancer and photographic model, and Antonello (b. 1988), who is a mathematical engineer (Politecnico di Milano) and holds a PhD in mathematics from the École Polytechnique Fédérale de Lausanne.

== Works ==
- Tempi di malafede. Una storia italiana tra fascismo e dopoguerra. Guido Piovene ed Eugenio Colorni, Einaudi, Turin, 1999 (new ed. Hoepli, Milan, 2012).
- Raffaele Mattioli e il filosofo domato, Einaudi, Turin, 2002 (new ed. Hoepli, Milan, 2017).
- with Raffaele Liucci: Lo stregone. La prima vita di Indro Montanelli, Einaudi, Turin, 2006.
- with Raffaele Liucci: Montanelli, l’anarchico borghese, Einaudi, Turin, 2009; new ed. in one volume (including Lo stregone), Indro Montanelli. Una biografia: 1909-2001, Hoepli, Milan, 2014.
- Antonio Foglia (1891-1957), Milan, 2009 (private edition).
- Mattioli e Cuccia. Due banchieri del Novecento, Einaudi, Turin, 2011.
- Giovanni Enriques, dalla Olivetti alla Zanichelli, Hoepli, Milan, 2013 (including a 103' DVD titled Giovanni Enriques, che seppe immaginare il futuro, directed by Luigi Faccini).
- I Cosattini. Una famiglia antifascista di Udine, Hoepli, Milan, 2016.
- Ebrei riluttanti, Hoepli, Milan, 2019 (Reluctant Jews, translated by Jeremy Moyle, Centro Primo Levi Editions, New York City, 2020).
- La voce d’oro di Mussolini. Storia di Lisa Sergio, la donna che visse tre volte, Neri Pozza, Vicenza, 2021.
- The Golden Voice of Mussolini and Roosevelt. Radio Journalist Lisa Sergio, translated by Will Schutt, Palgrave MacMillan, New York, 2026: https://link.springer.com/book/10.1007/978-3-032-08496-5.
- Il selvaggio dell’Orinoco sulle orme del padre, Hoepli, Milan, 2023.

== Written by Antonello Gerbi and edited by Sandro Gerbi ==
- La disputa del Nuovo Mondo. Storia di una polemica (1750-1900), with an intellectual biography of the author written by Piero Treves, Ricciardi, Milan-Naples, 1983 (reprint with an afterword by Antonio Melis, Adelphi, Milan, 2000).
- Il mito del Perù, Franco Angeli, Milan, 1988.
- Germania e dintorni (1929-1933), Ricciardi, Milan-Naples, 1993.
- Il Perù, una storia sociale. Dalla Conquista alla seconda guerra mondiale, Franco Angeli, Milan, 1994.
- Preferisco Charlot. Scritti sul cinema (1926-1933), edited by Gian Piero Brunetta and S. Gerbi, Nino Aragno, Turin, 2011.
- Il peccato di Adamo ed Eva. Storia della ipotesi di Beverland [1933], Adelphi, Milan, 2011.
