= Augusto Mancini =

Italian philologist, historian, and politician (1875–1957)

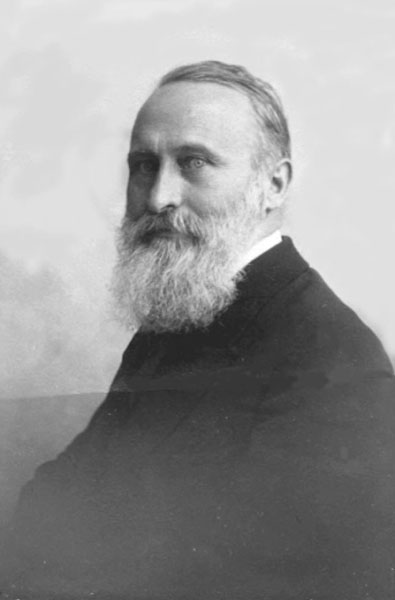
Augusto Mancini

Augusto Mancini (2 March 1875 – 18 September 1957) was an Italian philologist, Hellenist and politician.

== Life ==
Mancini was born in Livorno. In 1895 he graduated in letters from Pisa University in 1895 and began teaching at the Liceo Machiavelli in Lucca, which he soon adopted as his home town. He was appointed lecturer in ancient Greek literature in 1898 and succeeded Giovanni Pascoli in the chair of Greek and Latin grammar at Messina in 1902, remaining there until 1907 when Pisa University gave him the chair in ancient Greek literature (again replacing Pascoli), which he held until 1948. He was president of Lucca's academy for sciences, letters and arts and a member of the Accademia dei Lincei.

He did not limit his studies to classical philology but also studied authors of the Renaissance, Byzantine and Risorgimento eras. He was one of the first members of Lucca's Green Cross (Croce Verde), serving for many years as its president - they set up a scholarship in his name after his death and also named one of their new ambulances after him in 1957. A keen supporter of the ideas of Mazzini, the Domus Mazziniana in Pisa was set up on his initiative and he became its first president.

A convinced republican, he was part of the Italian Republican Party until 1913, when he left it after disagreeing with its abstentionist policy. He became a candidate for the Italian Radical Party for the college of Borgo a Mozzano in the Italian general election of 1913, but was defeated by the cleric Tomba. He tried again in the 1915 election with the support of the left in Lucca and was elected after his rival's win was annulled for fraud. He became a supporter of interventionism in the years after World War One and broke with the socialists. Re-elected to parliament in 1919 and 1921, he entered the Social Democracy party after the radicals split.

He soon became a target for fascists in Lucca and was forced to withdraw from all public office. After the assassination of Giacomo Matteotti, he and other anti-fascists from Lucca formed a secret committee which re-emerged during the Italian resistance era. The fascist regime arrested and imprisoned him from 5 January to 14 May 1944 and he became a point of reference for the democrats in Lucca, being appointed the first president of the city's clandestine National Liberation Committee. At the end of the Second World War, he took part in three legislatures, took part in the leadership of the Consulta Nazionale and also became the first freely-elected reader at Pisa University from 8 June 1945 to 31 October 1947. He then became a professor emeritus, though he still taught in the 1947–1948 academic year. He was retired for reaching the maximum age on 1 November 1950 and then made a professor emeritus by presidential decree on 29 January 1951. Returning to the Republican Party, in 1953 he was a candidate for the senate elections of 1953 but did not win his seat. He died in Lucca on 18 September 1957 from a brain hemorrhage.
