= Guido Carli =

Italian politician (1914–1993)

Guido Carli OMRI
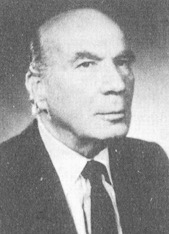

Minister of the Treasury
- In office 22 July 1989 – 24 April 1992
- Prime Minister: Giulio Andreotti
- Preceded by: Giuliano Amato
- Succeeded by: Piero Barucci

President of the Confindustria
- In office 23 July 1976 – 6 May 1980
- Preceded by: Gianni Agnelli
- Succeeded by: Vittorio Merloni

Governor of the Bank of Italy
- In office 18 August 1960 – 18 August 1975
- Preceded by: Donato Menichella
- Succeeded by: Paolo Baffi

Director General of the Bank of Italy
- In office 31 October 1959 – 17 August 1960
- Preceded by: Paride Formentini
- Succeeded by: Paolo Baffi

Minister of Foreign Trade
- In office 20 May 1957 – 2 July 1958
- Prime Minister: Adone Zoli
- Preceded by: Bernardo Mattarella
- Succeeded by: Emilio Colombo

Personal details
- Born: 28 March 1914 Brescia, Italy
- Died: 23 April 1993 (aged 79) Spoleto, Italy
- Education: University of Padua

Guido Carli (28 March 1914 – 23 April 1993) was an Italian banker, economist, and politician. His father was the prominent fascist sociologist Filippo Carli.

== Biography ==
He was the son of Filippo Carli (1876–1938), a university professor of Sociology and Political Economy, as well as a trade unionist and member of the National Fascist Party since its origins, who wrote a famous essay on the theoretical basis of the fascist state (corporate state). This fact led Guido Carli to write in some fascist magazines. Graduated in Law from the University of Padua, he began his career in 1937 as an official at IRI.

After an experience at the International Monetary Fund, he became president of Mediocredito from 1953 to 1956; then he served as Minister of Foreign Trade in the Zoli government, from 20 May 1957 to 2 July 1958, assuming an important role of reassurance of the international markets.

From 1959 to 1960, he was president of Crediop; subsequently, in October 1959, he was appointed director general of the Bank of Italy. He became its governor in August 1960, replacing Donato Menichella, while assuming the office of president of the Italian Exchange Office. He immediately called for greater concertation between central banks and, after the fluctuating trend of the Italian lira during the decade of the economic boom, was managing the effects of currency tensions coming from the United States, which culminated in the abandonment of the gold-dollar parity and with the Smithsonian Agreement.

He remained in office until 18 August 1975, when he resigned. He was replaced by Paolo Baffi, his main collaborator — although the views were not always coincident — as general manager of the issuing institution since 1960. From 1976 to 1980, he was president of Confindustria.

He was elected Senator as an independent among the ranks of the Christian Democracy in 1983 and in 1987; in 1992, he was not re-elected. He was president of Assonime (Association of Italian Joint Stock Companies) from 1989 to 1991. He also served as Minister of Treasure in the sixth and seventh Andreotti governments, from 22 July 1989 to 24 April 1992. During his mandate, he was one of the signatories of the Maastricht Treaty for Italy.

From 1 November 1978 to his death, he was president of the LUISS University of Rome, which in 1994 (one year after his death) changed its name to "LUISS Guido Carli".

== Awards and honours ==
Knight Grand Cross of the Order of Merit of the Italian Republic – awarded on 2 June 1962

== See also ==
- Libera Università Internazionale degli Studi Sociali Guido Carli

Government offices
Preceded by Paride Formentini	Director General of the Bank of Italy; 1959–1960	Succeeded by Paolo Baffi
Preceded by Donato Menichella	Governor of the Bank of Italy; 1960–1975	Succeeded by Paolo Baffi
Political offices
Preceded by Giuliano Amato	Minister of Treasury; 1989–1992	Succeeded by Piero Barucci
