= Natale Masera =

Italian footballer

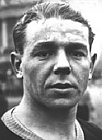

Personal information
- Date of birth: 1 June 1910
- Place of birth: Busto Arsizio, Italy
- Date of death: 24 May 1985 (aged 74)
- Height: 1.70 m (5 ft 7 in)
- Position: Midfielder

Senior career*
Years	Team	Apps	(Gls)
1928–1933	Pro Patria	51	(18)
1933–1934	Ambrosiana-Inter	10	(1)
1934–1935	Bari	23	(6)
1935–1936	Ambrosiana-Inter	1	(0)
1936–1937	Napoli	14	(0)
1937–1938	Sanremese	22	(7)
1938–1940	Varese	22	(1)
1940–1941	Pro Patria	5	(3)
1941–1942	Cremonese	0	(0)
1944–1945	Lecco	12	(0)
- * Club domestic league appearances and goals

Natale Masera (born 1 June 1910 in Busto Arsizio) was an Italian professional football player.
