= Paolo Baratta =

Italian economist, public manager and former politician

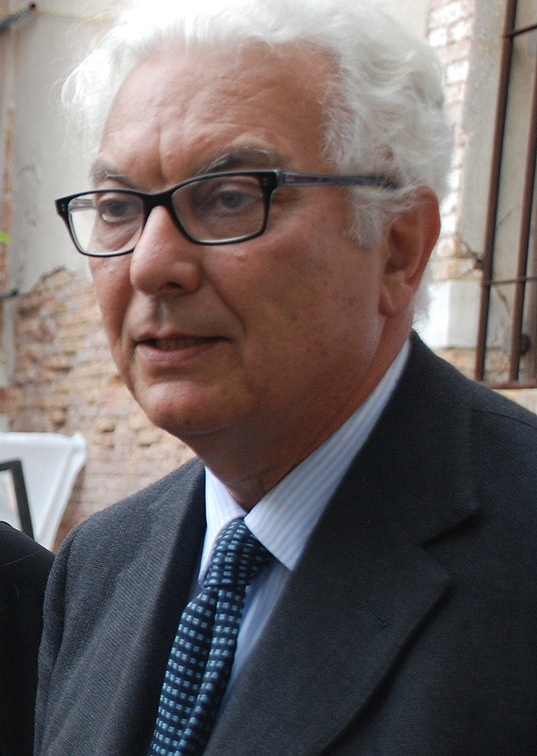

President of Venice Biennale
- In office 17 January 2008 – 27 January 2020
- Preceded by: Davide Croff
- Succeeded by: Roberto Cicutto
- In office 18 March 1998 – 14 December 2001
- Preceded by: Lino Miccicchè
- Succeeded by: Franco Bernabè

Personal details
- Born: 11 November 1939 (age 86) Milan, Italy
- Website: paolobaratta.com

Paolo Baratta OMRI (born 11 November 1939) is an Italian economist and ex-minister. From 2008 to 2020 he was the President of the Venice Biennale.

== Life and career ==
Baratta graduated in Engineering at the Polytechnic University of Milan before studying for a second degree in Economics at Pembroke College, Cambridge. In 1967 he did industrial research for the Italian Association for the development of Industry in the South, the SVIMEZ. In 1977 he became director of the ICIPU, an Italian credit consortium for public companies; later, he became the first vice president and then president.

From 1980 to 1992, he held many positions: in addition to the ICIPU presidency he was also president of Crediop, the credit consortium for public works; vice president of Nuovo Banco Ambrosiano and president of the Italian banking association.

In 1993 he became Minister in Giuliano Amato's cabinet. Subsequently he held the position of Minister of Foreign Trade in the Ciampi Cabinet (1993-1994); Minister of Industry, Commerce and Interim Crafts in the Ciampi Government (1994); Minister of Public Works and Minister of the Environment in the Dini Cabinet (1995-1996).

Baratta was president of the Venice Biennale for 12 years (2008–2020) and is still a member of the boards of the Ferrovie dello Stato and of Telecom Italia. He is president of the Roman Philharmonic Academy and has been vice president of the Italian Environmental Fund.

== Honour ==
- Italy: Knight Grand Cross of the Order of Merit of the Italian Republic (11 May 1994)
