= Cesare Previti =

Italian politician (born 1934)

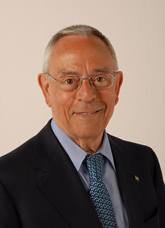

Minister of Defense
- In office 10 May 1994 – 17 January 1995
- Prime Minister: Silvio Berlusconi
- Preceded by: Fabio Fabbri
- Succeeded by: Domenico Corcione

Member of the Chamber of Deputies
- In office 9 May 1996 – 31 July 2007
- Constituency: Rome (1996–2006); Lazio (2006–2007)

Member of the Senate of the Republic
- In office 15 April 1994 – 8 May 1996
- Constituency: Rome

Personal details
- Born: 21 October 1934 (age 91) Reggio Calabria, Italy
- Party: MSI (1968–1994); FI (1994–2007)
- Spouse: Silvana Previti
- Education: University of Rome
- Profession: Lawyer (disbarred)

Cesare Previti (born 21 October 1934 in Reggio Calabria) is a former Italian politician, disbarred lawyer, and convicted criminal. Along with Marcello Dell'Utri, he was a close friend and right-hand of Silvio Berlusconi and founder of Forza Italia (FI).

== Biography ==
Born in Reggio Calabria, he grew up in Rome, where he started practicing law. In 1971 he became acquainted with Silvio Berlusconi, the construction magnate, later to be media mogul and Prime Minister of Italy. He was the administrator of the property of a nineteen-year-old girl, whose father, the Marquess Casati Stampa, had killed her mother and her mother's lover before committing suicide in a celebrated case. In this capacity, he engineered the sale of her villa in Arcore to Berlusconi, for 500 million lire, paid in the form of shares in then-unquoted companies. Many people would later cry foul, claiming that the amount was insufficient by far. In the end, she found herself forced to sell back the shares to Berlusconi and Previti for 250 million lire, half their previous value. After that, Previti worked for Berlusconi's own Fininvest company, and acquired a reputation as a ruthless but extremely capable lawyer.

In 1994, after Berlusconi had founded his Forza Italia political party, Previti won election to the Senate. Berlusconi, upon forming his first Cabinet, had wanted him as Minister of Justice, but President of the Republic Oscar Luigi Scalfaro was opposed on account of Previti's allegedly shady dealings, so ultimately it was decided he should exchange portfolios with Alfredo Biondi, who had been earmarked for Defence. Thus Previti became the Minister of Defence in Berlusconi's first government, from May to December 1994 (serving until January 1995 as caretaker).

Previti was elected to the Chamber of Deputies, again for Forza Italia, both in 1996 and in 2001, but was investigated, together with Berlusconi, for allegedly bribing judges in a series of high-profile cases relating to his years of service as Berlusconi's attorney before entering politics. Previti strenuously defended his record, claiming the judges were politically motivated.

== SME trial ==
In the "Sme" case, he was sentenced to five years in jail on 22 November 2003 but he appealed and remained free. On 2 December 2005 he was condemned again and sentenced to five years, but he appealed once more. On 30 November 2006 the verdict was invalidated by the Corte di Cassazione, on the ground that the Milan court did not have jurisdiction to try the case. The case has been transferred to Perugia. The prescription term, however, was very close (April 2007). He is accused of corrupting judge Renato Squillante: the sum of about $434,000 was transferred from Silvio Berlusconi's personal account to one of his lawyer Previti's accounts and later to the judge's account.

== IMI-SIR trial ==
In the "Imi-Sir" case, he was sentenced to eleven years in jail on 29 April 2003 and he appealed. He was later sentenced to seven years on 23 May 2005 but he appealed again.

=== Final conviction ===
On 4 May 2006, he was definitely sentenced by the Court of Cassation to six years.

== House arrests ==
Thanks to laws passed by Silvio Berlusconi government, at the time of his arrest, he was already old enough to ask to have his prison time turned into house arrest. The change was carried out on 10 May 2006. Previti had spent only few days in prison. In both cases, he was also forbidden to run for or hold public offices. On 11 December 2006 he was charged with defamation. He had accused judges of hiding evidence in previous Berlusconi trials. Milan court judges were found not guilty by the Brescia court, which later opened a case against Previti. He finally resigned under great pressure from the Chamber of Deputies on 31 July 2007.

== Electoral history ==
Election	House	Constituency	Party	Votes	Result
1994	Senate of the Republic	Rome – Val Melaina	FI	68,819	Elected
1996	Chamber of Deputies	Rome – Nero's Tomb	FI	40,643	Elected
2001	Chamber of Deputies	Rome – Nero's Tomb	FI	42,742	Elected
2006	Chamber of Deputies	Lazio 1	FI	– (Note: Elected in a closed list proportional representation system.)	Elected

Political offices
Preceded by Fabio Fabbri	Italian Minister of Defense; 1994–1995	Succeeded by Domenico Corcione
