= Paolo Baffi =

Italian academic, banker, and economist

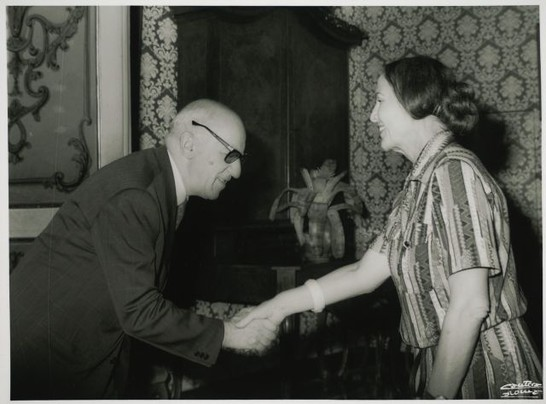
Paolo Baffi with Nilde Iotti, President of the Italian Chamber of Deputies, 1979

Paolo Baffi (5 August 1911 – 4 August 1989) was an Italian academic, banker, and economist. He was the Governor of Bank of Italy from 1975 to 1979.

== Biography ==
He was born at Broni. He became governor of the Bank of Italy in 1975, succeeding Guido Carli. His appointment was supported by both the government parties (in particular the Republican Party and Aldo Moro of Christian Democracy, then president) and the main opposition force, the Communist Party.

He resigned in 1979, after a failed accusation against him led by magistrates of the Tribunal of Rome, considered kin to the Caltagirone family (a group of builders who had contracted heavy debts with the Bank of Italy) and Christian Democracy. Baffi died in Rome in 1989.

In March 1979, he was implicated in a judicial investigation into the lack of vigilance by the credit institutes opened by the deputy prosecutor of the Republic of Rome Luciano Infelisi and conducted by the investigating judge Antonio Alibrandi. The vice-director of the Bank of Italy, Mario Sarcinelli, was also indicted and even arrested. A wave of indignation swept through Rome's judiciary. Baffi and Sarcinelli received countless demonstrations of support. Baffi, who escaped the shame of arrest due to his age, preferred to resign as governor in September 1979. Before relinquishing his post, he suggested the name of his successor, Carlo Azeglio Ciampi, to Prime Minister Francesco Cossiga.

Baffi was acquitted: the indictment was unfounded. The suspect is that he was indicted for "indication" of powerful foreign powers because he was defending Italy's interests in the negotiations to join the new European single currency.

He was awarded the title of honorary governor and, until his death in August 1989, was advisor and from September 13, 1988 vice-president of the Bank for International Settlements (BIS).

The Bank of Italy library has been named after him since 1990.

== Honour ==
- Italy: Knight Grand Cross of the Order of Merit of the Italian Republic (2 june 1965)

== Bibliography ==
- Il problema monetario italiano sullo scorcio del 1944. Padova: CEDAM. 1948.
- Il dollaro e l'oro. Padova: CEDAM. 1953.
- Studi sulla moneta. Milano: Giuffrè. 1965. Soveria Mannelli, Rubbettino, 2011, ISBN 978-88-498-2995-2.
- Nuovi studi sulla moneta. Milano: Giuffrè. 1973. Soveria Mannelli, Rubbettino, 2011, ISBN 978-88-498-2996-9.
- L'indebitamento esterno dei Paesi in via di sviluppo: situazioni e prospettive. introduction by Amintore Fanfani. Roma: Tipografia del Senato. 1986.
- Testimonianze e ricordi. Milano: Libri Scheiwiller. 1990. ISBN 88-7644-149-2.
- Le origini della cooperazione tra le banche centrali: l'istituzione della Banca dei regolamenti internazionali. with an essay on Paolo Baffi by Antonio Fazio. Roma-Bari: Laterza. 2002. ISBN 88-420-6906-X.
- Parola di Governatore. edited by Sandro Gerbi and Beniamino Andrea Piccone. Torino: Aragno. 2013.
- Anni del disincanto. Lettere 1967-1981 (carteggio tra Paolo Baffi e Arturo Carlo Jemolo). edited by Beniamino Andrea Piccone. Torino: Aragno. 2014.
- Servitore dell'interesse pubblico. Lettere 1937-1989. edited by Beniamino Andrea Piccone. Torino: Aragno. 2016.
- Via Nazionale e gli economisti stranieri. 1944-1953. edited by Beniamino Andrea Piccone. Torino: Aragno. 2017.
