= Mario Arcelli =

Italian economist and politician

Mario Ugo Arcelli (21 May 1935 – 18 March 2004) was an Italian economist who at one time was Minister for the Budget in the Italian government.

== Early life and education ==
Arcelli was born and raised in Milan, Italy. His family originated from Piacenza.

His bond with economic studies started with the degree he got in 1957 from Bocconi University, Milan, being awarded top marks and distinction.

== Academic career ==
In the following years Arcelli was an assistant researcher in the same university. In 1963 he became professor at the University of Trieste, and in 1967 he became full professor in economics. From 1969 to 1973 he took the chair of Economics at the University of Padua, leaving for a one-year visiting period at the Massachusetts Institute of Technology (M.I.T.) in Boston (United States). In 1974 he became full professor of economics at the La Sapienza University in Rome, where he served for about fifteen years, until 1989, and directed the Department of Economics between the late 1970s and early 1980s.

In 1989 he started teaching at LUISS (then LUISS Guido Carli) university of Rome, becoming chancellor in 1992 and remaining in that position until his retirement in 2002. In October 2003 he was appointed to the honorary post of professor emeritus by the university.

Mario Arcelli was appointed in 1995 member of the Accademia Nazionale dei Lincei, one of the world's most important academic institutions. He was also deputy chairman of the Italian Economic Society (S.I.E.) and a member of the board of the Istituto per l'Enciclopedia Italiana. From 1979 until his death, he was editor of the Review of Economic Conditions in Italy.

== Government adviser and minister ==
Arcelli was for a decade one of the main economic advisers of Italian governments, serving as Head of the Economic Affairs Department at the office of the prime minister between 1981 and 1983 (during the Fanfani V and Spadolini I and II cabinets). He was also economic adviser of the prime minister in 1987 (Fanfani VI cabinet) and 1988-89 (De Mita cabinet). In those roles he was part of the Italian delegation to five G7 summits, held in Versailles, Williamsburg, Venice, Toronto and Paris.

In February 1996 he became Minister of Budget, economic planning, and European affairs, during the Italian six-month turn as presidency of the Council of the European Union. In this role he chaired the Ecofin summit in Venice (May 1996) and continued the process that led, two years afterwards, to the birth of the euro.

Between the late 1970s and early 1980s, he was a member of several government committees, and acted as advisor of the Bank of Italy. He also was a member of the scientific advisory committee of Confindustria (the association of Italian industrialists) and of several committees of the Ministry of the Budget and Economic Planning.

Arcelli held a number of corporate and business appointments. He was a member of the board of directors of ENI, the Italian oil group (1980–82), deputy chairman of Banco di Roma (1986–1992), member of the board of directors of RAS S.p.A. (1998–2004), of the Società per la Bonifica dei Terreni Ferraresi (1995–2004), and of Pininfarina S.p.A. (1995–2002) and of Italcementi S.p.A. (1998–2004).

At the Christmas 2001 mass in St Peter's, Rome, Arcelli read the address to Pope John Paul II as a representative of the Italian universities.

== Honour ==
- Italy: Knight Grand Cross of the Order of Merit of the Italian Republic (2 June 1993)
