= Lamberto Dini =

Italian politician and economist (born 1931)

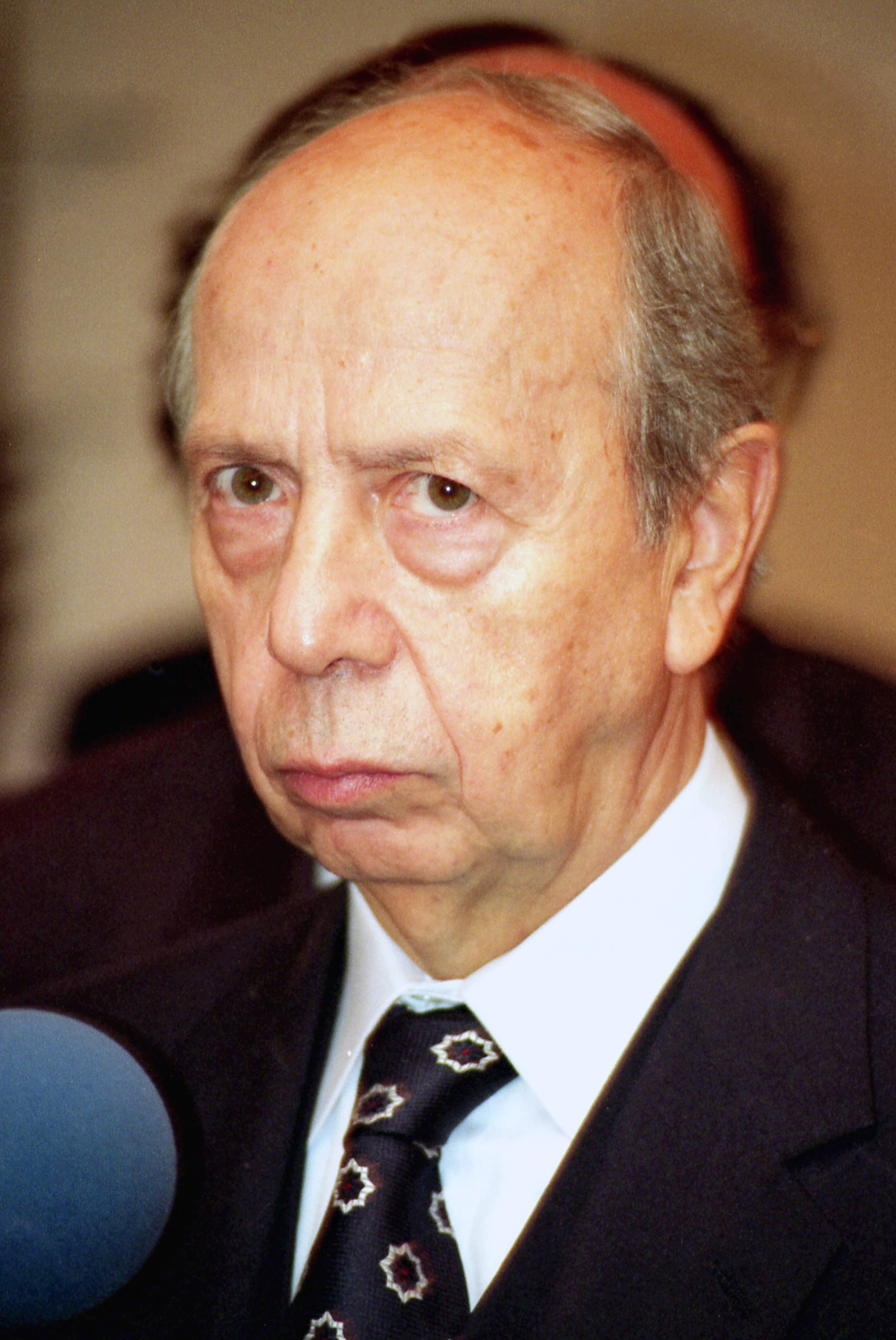
- Dini in 1999

Prime Minister of Italy
- In office 17 January 1995 – 18 May 1996
- President: Oscar Luigi Scalfaro
- Preceded by: Silvio Berlusconi
- Succeeded by: Romano Prodi

Minister of Foreign Affairs
- In office 18 May 1996 – 11 June 2001
- Prime Minister: Romano Prodi; Massimo D'Alema; Giuliano Amato
- Preceded by: Susanna Agnelli
- Succeeded by: Renato Ruggiero

Minister of Justice
- Acting; 19 October 1995 – 16 February 1996
- Prime Minister: Himself
- Preceded by: Filippo Mancuso
- Succeeded by: Vincenzo Caianiello

Minister of Treasury
- In office 11 May 1994 – 18 May 1996
- Prime Minister: Silvio Berlusconi; Himself
- Preceded by: Piero Barucci
- Succeeded by: Carlo Azeglio Ciampi

Director General of the Bank of Italy
- In office 8 October 1979 – 11 May 1994
- Deputy: Mario Sarcinelli; Alfredo Persiani Acerbo; Cannelo Oteri; Antonio Fazio; Tommaso Padoa-Schioppa; Vincenzo Desario
- Preceded by: Carlo Azeglio Ciampi
- Succeeded by: Vincenzo Desario

Member of the Senate of the Republic
- In office 30 May 2001 – 14 March 2013
- Constituency: Tuscany (2001–2008); Lazio (2008–2013)

Member of the Chamber of Deputies
- In office 9 May 1996 – 29 May 2001
- Constituency: Florence

Personal details
- Born: 1 March 1931 (age 95) Florence, Italy
- Party: RI (1996–2002); DL (2002–2007); LD (2007–2009); PdL (2009–2013)
- Height: 1.73 m (5 ft 8 in)
- Spouse: Donatella Pasquali Zingone
- Education: University of Florence; University of Minnesota; University of Michigan
- Profession: Economist
- Dini's voice Discussing Austria–Italy relations Recorded 1 October 1996

Lamberto Dini (Italian: [lamˈbɛrto ˈdiːni]; born 1 March 1931) is an Italian politician and economist. He was the Director General of Bank of Italy from 1979 to 1994, Minister of Treasury from 1994 to 1996, the 51st prime minister of Italy from 1995 to 1996, and Foreign Minister from 1996 to 2001. At 95 years old, he is the oldest living prime minister of Italy.

== Early life and career ==
After studying economics in his native city of Florence, Dini took up a post at the International Monetary Fund in 1959, where he worked his way up until he served as executive director for Italy, Greece, Portugal and Malta between 1976 and 1979. Then, in October 1979, he moved to the Banca d'Italia, where he served as an executive until May 1994.

When Silvio Berlusconi formed the Berlusconi I Cabinet in May 1994, Dini served as Treasury Minister. Due to a split between Berlusconi and his coalition partner Umberto Bossi, the Lega Nord leader, Berlusconi's government collapsed in December 1994, after a mere seven months in power. In January 1995, Dini was appointed prime minister by President Oscar Luigi Scalfaro. Dini also took the portfolio for treasury in the cabinet and was a non-elected prime minister and minister. Though he was not noted as a left-winger, he was given the confidence vote of the left-wing parties (apart from the Communist Refoundation Party) and by Lega Nord, whereas his erstwhile partners in the right-wing government chose to abstain whilst citing benevolence. His cabinet was technocratic. Dini’s administration has been described as a “centre-right, market-oriented” one.

== The Olive Tree ==
In April 1996, a general election was called, in which Berlusconi's House of Freedoms coalition, minus the Lega Nord, was pitted against that of Romano Prodi, The Olive Tree. Dini chose to join The Olive Tree with his own centrist party, Italian Renewal. Dini was elected to the Italian Chamber of Deputies and served for the entire term as Minister of Foreign Affairs in four successive centre-left governments, under Prodi, Massimo D'Alema in two separate, successive cabinets, and finally Giuliano Amato. Italian Renewal merged into The Daisy, a larger party formed out of several centrist parties belonging to the centre-left coalition. The May 2001 general election was won by Berlusconi and his allies (including, once again, Lega Nord), which led to Berlusconi forming his second government in June. Dini was elected to the Italian Senate, and, in this capacity, served as a delegate to the Convention in charge of drafting the European Constitution (February 2002 – July 2003).

== The People of Freedom ==
In September 2007, a month before Democracy is Freedom – The Daisy merged with the Democrats of the Left to form the new big tent centre-left Democratic Party, Dini broke away from The Daisy to form the Liberal Democrats, a new incarnation of Italian Renewal. As the protagonist of the defeat of the government of Prime Minister Romano Prodi in a January 2008 Senate vote, in view of the 2008 Italian general election Dini joined The People of Freedom, the newly created Italian liberal-conservative party led by Silvio Berlusconi.

== Honours ==
In 2000, during a state visit to the United Kingdom, he was awarded an honorary Knighthood Grand Cross of the Most Distinguished Order of St Michael and St George. On 29 April 2009, the Japanese government announced that it awarded Dini the Grand Cordon of the Order of the Rising Sun; the honour was presented to him by the Emperor and the Japanese prime minister in a formal ceremony in May 2009.

=== Foreign honours ===
United Kingdom:

- Honorary Knight Grand Cross of the Most Distinguished Order of St Michael and St George (2000).

== Electoral history ==
Election	House	Constituency	Party	Votes	Result	Notes
1996	Chamber of Deputies	Florence 2	RI	59,346	Elected	
2001	Senate of the Republic	Tuscany – Florence-Scandicci	RI	85,357	Elected	
2006	Senate of the Republic	Tuscany	DL	– (Note: Elected in a closed list proportional representation system.)	Elected	
2008	Senate of the Republic	Lazio	PdL	–	Elected	

Government offices
Preceded by Carlo Azeglio Ciampi	Director General of the Bank of Italy; 1979–1994	Succeeded by Vincenzo Desario
Political offices
Preceded by Piero Barucci	Minister of Treasury; 1994–1996	Succeeded by Carlo Azeglio Ciampi
Preceded by Silvio Berlusconi	Prime Minister of Italy; 1995–1996	Succeeded by Romano Prodi
Preceded by Susanna Agnelli	Minister of Foreign Affairs; 1996–2001	Succeeded by Renato Ruggiero
Party political offices
New political party	Leader of Italian Renewal; 1996–2002	Position abolished
New political party	President of Liberal Democrats; 2007–2008	Succeeded by Daniela Melchiorre
