= 2008 Italian general election in Veneto =

Election

The Italian general election of 2008 took place on 13–14 April 2008.

The election was won in Veneto by the centre-right coalition between The People of Freedom and Lega Nord, as it happened at the national level. The People of Freedom was the largest party in the election with 27.4%, slightly ahead of Lega Nord (27.1%) and the Democratic Party (26.5%).

== Results ==
=== Chamber of Deputies ===
Coalition leader	votes	votes (%)	seats	Party	votes	votes (%)	seats
Silvio Berlusconi	1,669,234	54.5	31	The People of Freedom	838,640	27.4	15
Silvio Berlusconi	1,669,234	54.5	31	Lega Nord	830,594	27.1	16
Walter Veltroni	944,380	30.8	16	Democratic Party	812,506	26.5	14
Walter Veltroni	944,380	30.8	16	Italy of Values	131,874	4.3	2
Pier Ferdinando Casini	171,126	5.6	3	Union of the Centre	171,126	5.6	3
Fausto Bertinotti	68,159	2.2	-	The Left – The Rainbow	68,159	2.2	-
Daniela Santanchè	59,925	2.0	-	The Right	59,925	2.0	-
Giorgio Vido	31,353	1.0	-	Liga Veneta Repubblica	31,353	1.0	-
Renzo Rabellino	22,502	0.7	-	List of Speaking Crickets	22,502	0.7	-
Enrico Boselli	16,547	0.5	-	Socialist Party	16,547	0.5	-
Giuliano Ferrara	16,308	0.5	-	Abortion? No, thanks	16,308	0.5	-
Others	66,504	2.2	-	Others	66,504	2.2	-
Total coalitions	3,066,038	100.0	50	Total parties	3,066,038	100.0	50

Source: Regional Council of Veneto

=== Senate ===
Coalition leader	votes	votes (%)	seats	Party	votes	votes (%)	seats
Silvio Berlusconi	1,540,993	54.4	15	The People of Freedom	802,533	28.3	8
Silvio Berlusconi	1,540,993	54.4	15	Lega Nord	738,460	26.1	7
Walter Veltroni	895,433	31.6	9	Democratic Party	771,974	27.2	8
Walter Veltroni	895,433	31.6	9	Italy of Values	123,459	4.4	1
Pier Ferdinando Casini	162,719	5.7	-	Union of the Centre	162,719	5.7	-
Fausto Bertinotti	61,279	2.2	-	The Left – The Rainbow	61,279	2.2	-
Daniela Santanchè	49,101	1.7	-	The Right	49,101	1.7	-
Giorgio Vido	46,677	1.7	-	Liga Veneta Repubblica	46,677	1.7	-
Enrico Boselli	14,756	0.5	-	Socialist Party	14,756	0.5	-
Others	62,123	2.2	-	Others	62,123	2.2	-
Total coalitions	2,834,078	100.0	24	Total parties	2,834,078	100.0	24

Source: Regional Council of Veneto

== MPs elected in Veneto ==
=== Chamber of Deputies ===
==== Veneto 1 (Verona-Vicenza-Padova-Rovigo) ====
===== Lega Nord =====
- Stefano Stefani
- Matteo Bragantini
- Manuela Dal Lago
- Francesca Martini
- Massimo Bitonci
- Paola Goisis
- Alessandro Montagnoli
- Manuela Lanzarin
- Emanuela Munerato
- Giovanna Negro

===== The People of Freedom =====
- Niccolò Ghedini
- Alberto Giorgetti
- Aldo Brancher
- Francesco De Luca
- Filippo Ascierto
- Marino Zorzato (replaced by Giorgio Conte on 10 June 2010)
- Lorena Milanato
- Luca Bellotti
- Giustina Destro

===== Democratic Party =====
- Massimo Calearo
- Alessandro Naccarato
- Margherita Miotto
- Federica Mogherini
- Giampaolo Fogliardi
- Gian Pietro Dal Moro
- Federico Testa
- Daniela Sbrollini

===== Union of the Centre =====
- Roberto Rao
- Antonio De Poli

===== Italy of Values =====
- Antonio Borghesi

==== Veneto 2 (Venezia-Treviso-Belluno) ====
===== Lega Nord =====
- Gianpaolo Dozzo
- Guido Dussin
- Corrado Callegari
- Luciano Dussin (replaced by Sabina Fabi on 15 December 2011)
- Franco Gidoni
- Gianluca Forcolin

===== The People of Freedom =====
- Renato Brunetta
- Adolfo Urso
- Fabio Gava
- Valentino Valentini
- Maurizio Paniz
- Catia Polidori

===== Democratic Party =====
- Andrea Martella
- Pier Paolo Baretta
- Simonetta Rubinato
- Rodolfo Viola
- Delia Murer
- Francesco Tempestini

===== Union of the Centre =====
- Luisa Capitanio Santolini

===== Italy of Values =====
- Massimo Donadi

=== Senate ===
==== The People of Freedom ====
- Giancarlo Galan (replaced by Piero Longo on 29 April 2008)
- Luigi Ramponi
- Maria Elisabetta Alberti Casellati
- Maurizio Sacconi
- Maurizio Saia
- Paolo Scarpa Bonazza Buora
- Anna Bonfrisco
- Maurizio Castro

==== Lega Nord ====
- Federico Bricolo
- Piergiorgio Stiffoni
- Paolo Franco
- Alberto Filippi
- Gianvittore Vaccari
- Gianpaolo Vallardi
- Luciano Cagnin

==== Democratic Party ====
- Enrico Morando
- Maria Pia Garavaglia
- Paolo Giaretta
- Felice Casson
- Paolo Nerozzi
- Maurizio Fistarol
- Franca Donaggio
- Marco Stradiotto

==== Italy of Values ====
- Elio Lanutti
