= People and Territory =

Italian parliamentary group

People and Territory Popolo e Territorio
- Leader: Francesco Saverio Romano
- Founded: 20 January 2011
- Dissolved: 14 March 2013
- Ideology: Regionalism; Christian democracy Liberal conservatism
- Political position: Centre-right

People and Territory (Popolo e Territorio, PT), originally Responsible Initiative (Iniziativa Responsabile), was a centre-right parliamentary party active in the Chamber of Deputies of Italy in 2011–2013. Launched on 20 January 2011, the group was supportive of Berlusconi IV Cabinet. A large majority of its members were elected in Southern Italy. Its counterpart in the Senate was National Cohesion, which was composed mainly of splinters from Future and Freedom.

On 23 March 2011, Francesco Saverio Romano, a group member, was appointed minister of Agriculture. On 5 May 2011 Silvio Berlusconi appointed three under-secretaries from PT/IR: Giampiero Catone (Environment), Bruno Cesario and Catia Polidori (Economy and Finance).

== Composition ==
=== Latest members ===
The group included:

- The Populars of Italy Tomorrow (I Popolari di Italia Domani, PID)
  - ideology: Christian democracy, regionalism
  - leader: Francesco Saverio Romano
  - 4 deputies: Pippo Gianni, Michele Pisacane, Francesco Saverio Romano, Giuseppe Ruvolo
- Popular Action (Azione Popolare, AP)
  - ideology: National conservatism, liberal conservatism
  - leader: Silvano Moffa
  - 3 deputies: Silvano Moffa, Catia Polidori, Maria Grazia Siliquini
- Movement of National Responsibility (Movimento di Responsabilità Nazionale, MRN)
  - ideology: Centrism, populism
  - leader: Domenico Scilipoti
  - 3 deputies: Massimo Calearo, Bruno Cesario, Domenico Scilipoti
- Alliance of the Centre (Alleanza di Centro, AdC)
  - ideology: Christian democracy
  - leader: Francesco Pionati
  - 1 deputy: Francesco Pionati
- Popular Agreement (Intesa Popolare, IP)
  - ideology: Christian democracy
  - leader: Giampiero Catone
  - 1 deputy: Giampiero Catone (previously La Discussione and Christian Democracy)
- 7 deputies of The People of Freedom (PdL) who joined the group for technical reasons:
  - Vincenzo D'Anna, Giancarlo Lehner, Roberto Marmo, Giovanni Mottola, Andrea Orsini, Maria Elena Stasi, Vincenzo Taddei
- We the South (Noi Sud, NS)
  - ideology: Regionalism
  - leader: Antonio Milo
  - 2 deputies: Antonio Milo, Antonio Razzi.

=== Former members ===
The group originally included also 4 others deputies of We the South (NS): Elio Belcastro (who was appointed under-secretary for the Environment by Berlusconi on 28 July 2007, in representation of IR/PT, Arturo Iannaccone, Americo Porfidia and Lucio Sardelli (who left the party in the summer of 2011).

Three more deputies from the PdL (Mario Pepe, Gerardo Soglia and Carlo Nola) were members of the group for some time.

Other former members of the group include Paolo Guzzanti (ex-PSI/FI/PdL/PLI) and Maurizio Grassano (ex-LN/LD/AdC).
