= Domenico Scilipoti =

Italian politician (born 1957)

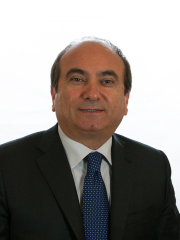

Member of the Senate of the Republic
- In office 15 March 2013 – 22 March 2018
- Constituency: Calabria

Member of the Chamber of Deputies
- In office 29 April 2008 – 14 March 2013
- Constituency: Sicilia 2

Personal details
- Born: 26 August 1957 (age 69) Barcellona Pozzo di Gotto, Italy
- Party: PSDI (until 1998); IDV (2000–2010); MRN (2010–2013); PdL (2013); FI (since 2013)
- Education: University of Messina
- Profession: Politician, gynecologist, acupuncturist

Domenico Scilipoti Isgrò (born 26 August 1957) is an Italian politician and doctor.

== Biography ==
Born in Barcellona Pozzo di Gotto, Sicily, Domenico Scilipoti graduated from the University of Messina in medicine and surgery, getting a specialization in gynecology and obstetrics. He practices as a gynecologist and acupuncturist and was a visiting professor at the Departamento de Anatomia Humana at the Federal University of Paraná (State of Brazil) and the A.B.P.S. of Salvador de Bahia (Brazil).

Scilipoti was municipal councilor in Terme Vigliatore (Messina) from 1983 to 1998 and from 2003 to 2005; for the same municipality he also served as deputy mayor in 1986 and as assessor of budget and finance in 1998.

In the 2001 and 2006 general election he was candidate for the Senate with the Italy of Values, but he was not elected. He was elected for the first time at the Chamber of Deputies in the 2008 general election.

On 9 December 2010 he left IdV to found the Movement of National Responsibility and on 14 December, along with Bruno Cesario and Massimo Calearo, saved the Berlusconi IV Cabinet voting for the trust. Shortly after the vote of trust in the Chambers, in Piazza San Silvestro in Rome, some immigrants paraded in front of TV newscasts with banners supporting the decisions of Scilipoti. Identified by the police, they declared that they were paid by the same deputy to make believe that there is a consensus on his choices.

In January 2011 he joined the new parliamentary group Responsible Initiative (later People and Territory), of which he was elected vicar deputy leader.

In the 2013 general election Scilipoti was elected senator with The People of Freedom. He was again candidate to the Senate in 2018 with Forza Italia, but he was not re-elected.

== Publications ==
- Moxibustione: applicazione della moxibustione in terapia medica (in Italian). San Giovanni La Punta (Catania): Pandora. 1995. ISBN 88-8031-456-4.
- Il nostro futuro: le medicine del terzo millennio (in Italian). Milazzo (Messina): SPES. 2002.
- Filosofia-scienza e agopuntura Ryodoraku (in Italian). Milazzo (Messina): SPES. 2007.
- Olismo: il nuovo paradigma del terzo millennio (in Italian). Milan: Lswr. 2016. ISBN 978-88-6895-431-4.
- Il dialogo come processo di pace nel mondo (in Italian). Cento (Ferrara): HILKIA. 2017. ISBN 9781927021996.
- Scilipoti, Domenico; Volpe, Bruno (2019). Il dialogo, strada di pace (in Italian). preface by His Excellence José María Serrano Ruiz. Caltanissetta: Paruzzo. ISBN 978-88-6149-123-6.
