= Stradiotto =

Stradiotto is a surname. Notable people with the surname include:

- Marco Stradiotto (born 1965), Italian politician
- Mark Stradiotto, Canadian chemist
