= Movement of National Responsibility =

Italian political party

Movement of National Responsibility Movimento di Responsabilità Nazionale
- Leader: Domenico Scilipoti
- Founded: 9 December 2010
- Dissolved: 16 November 2013
- Merged into: Forza Italia
- Ideology: Populism; Centrism
- Political position: Centre-right

The Movement of National Responsibility (Movimento di Responsabilità Nazionale, MRN) was a small centrist parliamentary political party in Italy led by Domenico Scilipoti.

== Background ==
The party was founded on 9 December 2010 by three deputies coming from centre-left parties and headed to support the centre-right government led by Silvio Berlusconi: Massimo Calearo (ex-PD and ex-ApI), Bruno Cesario (ex-PD and ex-ApI) and Domenico Scilipoti (ex-IdV). On 14 December the three deputies voted in favour of Berlusconi in a close vote of confidence. In October 2011 the party had its first congress: Scilipoti was confirmed secretary and Cesario president.

On 20 January 2011 the MRN was a founding component of Responsible Initiative, a centre-right group in the Italian Chamber of Deputies.

In October 2012, the balance of accounts of the People of Freedom showed that the Movement of National Responsibility had received €49,000 of financial support from PdL for posters advertising the MRN's founding congress.

In 2013 the party joined Forza Italia.

== Scilipotism ==
Scilipotism is a neologism that appeared in the spoken language in December 2010, after Domenico Scilipoti, elected in an opposition party (Italia dei Valori) left the party and started supporting the Berlusconi Government coalition. The neologism seems to describe such a sudden transformation of political ideas and, particularly, of Parliament position (in Italy known as il salto della quaglia – the jump of the quail) for uncertain personal reasons but, certainly, for the advantage of the new political side. A group of "scilipotists" made the Berlusconi Government surviving for about one more year.

As per the International Business Times, '"Everybody says that I am crazy, but I don't care. They said the same to Ezra Pound," said Scilipoti during the seminar. Pound was confined to a U.S. mental hospital after the war.'

== Leadership ==
- Secretary: Domenico Scilipoti (2010–2013)
- President: Bruno Cesario (2010–2013)
