= List of presidents of the Province of Cuneo =

President of the Province of Cuneo
- Presidente della Provincia di Cuneo
- Incumbent; Luca Robaldo since 26 September 2022
- Term length: 4 years
- Inaugural holder: Ottavio Giroldi
- Formation: 1889

The president of the Province of Cuneo is the head of the provincial government in Cuneo, Piedmont, Italy. The president oversees the administration of the province, coordinates the activities of the municipalities, and represents the province in regional and national matters.

Since September 2022, the office has been held by Luca Robaldo, a civic politician.

== List ==
=== Presidents of the Provincial Deputation (1889–1926) ===
| Nº | Portrait | Name | Term | | Party |
| Nº | Portrait | Name | Start | End | Party |
|---|---|---|---|---|---|
| 1 | | Ottavio Giroldi | 1889 | 1898 | ? |
| 2 | | Giacomo Viale | 1898 | 1909 | ? |
| 3 | | Luigi Moschetti | 1909 | ? | Historical Left; Liberal Union |

=== Presidents of the Province (1951–present) ===
| Nº | Portrait | Name | Term | | Party |
| Nº | Portrait | Name | Start | End | Party |
|---|---|---|---|---|---|
| | | ? | ? | ? | ? |
| | | Guido Bonino | 1985 | 29 February 1988 | Christian Democracy |
| | | Giovanni Quaglia | 29 February 1988 | 4 July 1990 | Christian Democracy; Italian People's Party; Union of the Centre |
| | | Giovanni Quaglia | 4 July 1990 | 8 May 1995 | Christian Democracy; Italian People's Party; Union of the Centre |
| | | Giovanni Quaglia | 8 May 1995 | 28 June 1999 | Christian Democracy; Italian People's Party; Union of the Centre |
| | | Giovanni Quaglia | 28 June 1999 | 15 June 2004 | Christian Democracy; Italian People's Party; Union of the Centre |
| | | Raffaele Costa | 15 June 2004 | 9 June 2009 | Forza Italia |
| | | Gianna Gancia | 9 June 2009 | 13 June 2014 | Lega Nord |
| | | Giuseppe Rossetto | 13 June 2014 | 13 October 2014 | Prefectural commissioner |
| | | Federico Borgna | 13 October 2014 | 31 October 2018 | Civic list |
| | | Federico Borgna | 31 October 2018 | 4 July 2022 | Civic list |
| | | Luca Robaldo | 26 September 2022 | Incumbent | Civic list |

== Sources ==
- "Storia amministrativa dell'ente". Ministero dell'Interno.
- Menichini, Piera (2005). "I presidenti delle Province dall'Unità alla Grande guerra: repertorio analitico". Storia Amministrazione Costituzione (13): 246–247.
