= 2015 Campania regional election =

10th election of the council and president of the Campania region

- 31 May 2015

All 51 seats to the Regional Council
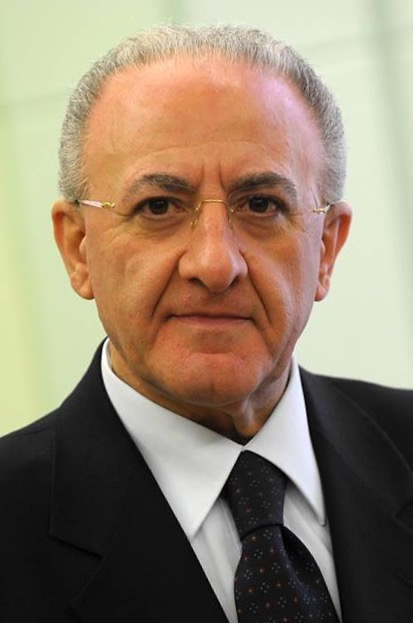

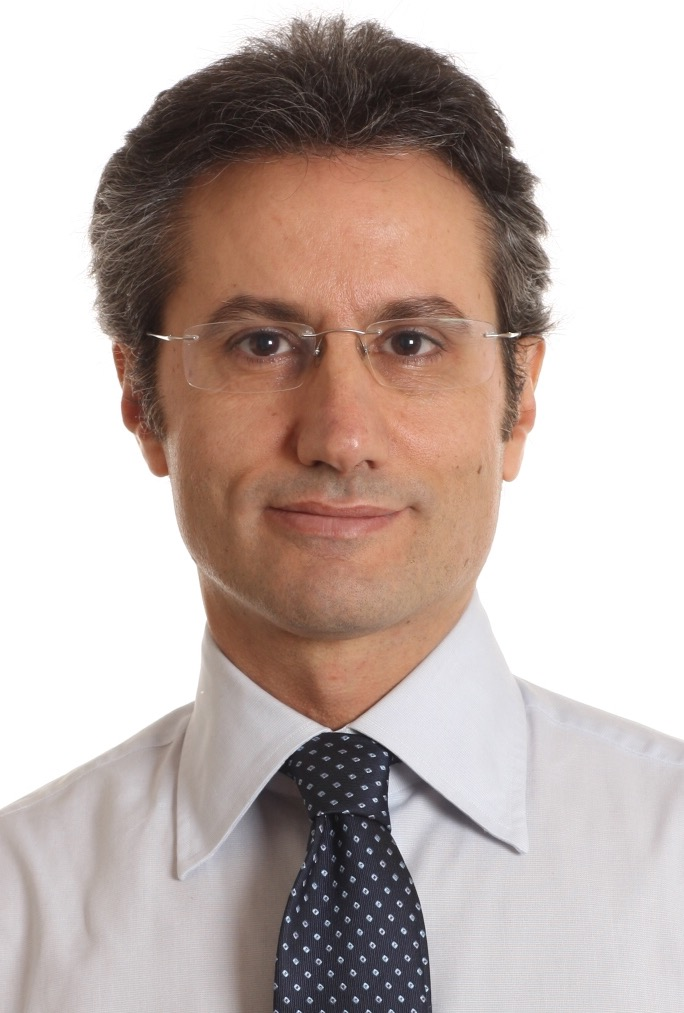

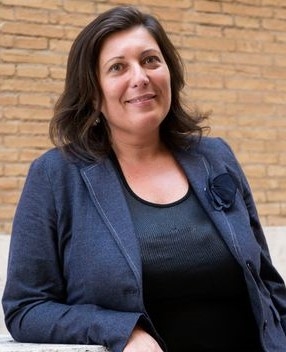
	Majority party	Minority party	Third party
Leader	Vincenzo De Luca	Stefano Caldoro	Valeria Ciarambino
Party	Democratic Party	Forza Italia	Five Star Movement
Alliance	Centre-left	Centre-right
Last election	22 seats, 43.0%	38 seats, 54.3%	0 seats, 1.4%
Seats won	31	13	7
Seat change	▲9	▼25	▲7
Popular vote	987,927	921,379	420,839
Percentage	41.2%	38.4%	17.5%
Swing	▼1.9	▼19.5%	▲16.1%
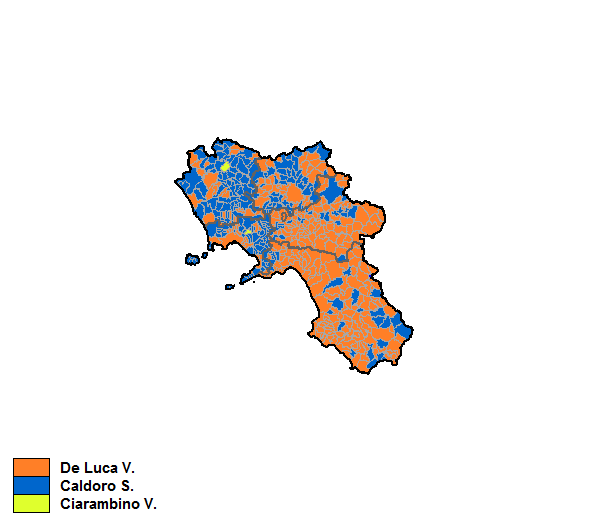
President before election
Stefano Caldoro
Forza Italia
President
Vincenzo De Luca
Democratic Party

The 2015 Campania regional election took place on 31 May 2015. The centre-left coalition candidate Vincenzo De Luca defeated the incumbent president, Stefano Caldoro of Forza Italia within the centre-right coalition, and became the new president of Campania. Until the 2024 Sardinian regional election, this was the last regional gain for the centre-left coalition.

== Results ==
31 May 2015 Campania regional election results
Candidates	Votes	%	Seats	Parties	Votes	%	Seats
Vincenzo De Luca	987,927	41.15	1				
Vincenzo De Luca	987,927	41.15	1	Democratic Party	443,879	19.49	15
Vincenzo De Luca	987,927	41.15	1	De Luca for President	111,698	4.90	4
Vincenzo De Luca	987,927	41.15	1	Free Campania	108,921	4.78	3
Vincenzo De Luca	987,927	41.15	1	Democratic Centre–Civic Choice	62,975	2.76	2
Vincenzo De Luca	987,927	41.15	1	Union of the Centre	53,628	2.35	2
Vincenzo De Luca	987,927	41.15	1	Italian Socialist Party	49,643	2.18	1
Vincenzo De Luca	987,927	41.15	1	Campania in Network (incl. ApI, New CDU, AS)	34,337	1.50	1
Vincenzo De Luca	987,927	41.15	1	Really–Greens	26,401	1.15	1
Vincenzo De Luca	987,927	41.15	1	Italy of Values (incl. RD)	25,913	1.13	1
Vincenzo De Luca	987,927	41.15	1	Total	917,395	40.29	30
Stefano Caldoro	921,379	38.37	1				
Stefano Caldoro	921,379	38.37	1	Forza Italia	405,773	17.81	7
Stefano Caldoro	921,379	38.37	1	Caldoro for President (incl. New PSI and PLI)	163,468	7.17	2
Stefano Caldoro	921,379	38.37	1	New Centre-Right	133,753	5.87	1
Stefano Caldoro	921,379	38.37	1	Brothers of Italy	124,543	5.46	2
Stefano Caldoro	921,379	38.37	1	We the South	47,367	2.09	–
Stefano Caldoro	921,379	38.37	1	Populars for Italy–Italian Republican Party	17,475	0.76	–
Stefano Caldoro	921,379	38.37	1	No More Land of Fire	6,561	0.28	–
Stefano Caldoro	921,379	38.37	1	Victims of Justice	5,941	0.26	–
Stefano Caldoro	921,379	38.37	1	Total	904,881	39.74	12
Valeria Ciarambino	420,839	17.52	–	Five Star Movement	387,546	17.01	7
Salvatore Vozza	52,777	2.19	–	Left at Work (incl. SEL, PRC, PCdI, GI, PDL, PdS)	53,000	2.32	–
Marco Esposito	17,860	0.74	–	Mo! Campania Civic List	14,332	0.62	–
Total candidates	2,400,782	100.00	2	Total parties	2,277,154	100.00	49
Source: Ministry of the Interior

Popular vote
PD	19.49%
FI	17.81%
M5S	17.01%
New PSI–PLI	7.17%
NCD	5.87%
FdI	5.46%
De Luca	4.90%
CL	4.78%
CD–SC	2.76%
UdC	2.35%
SaL	2.32%
PSI	2.18%
NS	2.09%
Others	5.81%

President
De Luca	41.15%
Caldoro	38.37%
Ciarambino	17.52%
Vozza	2.19%
Esposito	0.74%

== See also ==
- 2015 Italian regional elections
