= Antonio Razzi =

Italian politician

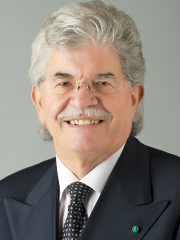

Member of the Senate of the Republic
- In office 15 March 2013 – 22 March 2018
- Constituency: Abruzzo

Member of the Chamber of Deputies
- In office 28 April 2006 – 14 March 2013
- Constituency: Europe

Personal details
- Born: 22 February 1948 (age 78) Giuliano Teatino, Italy
- Party: FI (2013–present); PdL (2011–2013); NS (2010–2011); IdV (2006–2010)
- Spouse: Maria Jesús Fernàndez
- Children: 2
- Profession: textile worker

Antonio Razzi (born 22 February 1948) is an Italian politician, former member of the Italian Senate for the centre-right party Forza Italia.

Razzi became quite famous in 2011, when he left the opposition party Italy of Values to support the government of Prime Minister Silvio Berlusconi. Moreover, he is known for his controversial positions regarding Kim Jong-un's North Korea and Bashar al-Assad's Syria.

== Biography ==
Antonio Razzi was born near Chieti, Abruzzo in 1948; but during 1960s he emigrated in Emmen, Switzerland, working as a textile worker.

In 2006 he was elected in the Chamber of Deputies for the centrist populist party Italy of Values, led by the former magistrate Antonio Di Pietro. He was re-elected in the snap election held in 2008.

In late 2010 Razzi left IdV, which was probably the most anti-Berlusconi party in the Italian Parliament, to join People and Territory, a centre-right parliamentary group which supported the government of Silvio Berlusconi.

In 2013 he was elected in the Italian Senate as a member of The People of Freedom.

On 23 January 2018, the new Berlusconi's party, Forza Italia, decided not to renew his candidature for the general election in March. Razzi criticised this choice, declaring that was not decided by Berlusconi but by other FI's leading members who were envious of his popularity.

== Controversies ==
=== North Korea ===
Antonio Razzi became quite famous in Italy for his statements regarding North Korea. He often stated that the Supreme Leader Kim Jong-un is a moderate politician, whose only aim is to bring democracy in that country. In addition, he often compares North Korea to Switzerland.

Senator Razzi denies the existence of concentration camps in North Korea, he claims that they are huge tomato greenhouses.

During an interview he added that Kim Jong-un and his generals are "wonderful people" who do not want to attack neither South Korea nor the United States and that their nuclear weapons serve only a defensive purpose.

=== Syria ===
Razzi also visited Damascus in 2017, where he met the Syrian President Bashar al-Assad. He stated that Assad is not a dictator but a democratic leader and he had never killed Syrian people but only terrorists. Razzi added that while they were talking about Berlusconi, Assad said that he was a great leader, and that along with Vladimir Putin and Muammar Gaddafi, they were changing the world in better.

=== Azerbaijan ===
During a press conference in Baku, Razzi stated that "Azerbaijan demonstrated an impeccable level of preparation for the 2018 Azerbaijani presidential election, which can serve as example for many countries." He noted that observers from Italy at the presidential election did not observe any violations, but, on the contrary, witnessed a professionally organized election. Razzi also said: "We received information from the Citizens’ Labor Rights Protection League, prepared jointly with the US organization AJF & Associates Inc., according to which Ilham Aliyev gained the majority of votes at the election, The election process was democratic and transparent. Fingerprint scanning is a very innovative system, and I have never encountered it. I wish Azerbaijan further prosperity."

== Other activities ==
Razzi had a key role in bringing the North Korean football player Han Kwang-Song to Italy.

== Awards and honours ==

5th Class / Knight: Cavaliere Ordine al Merito della Repubblica Italiana: 1994
