= Federico Borgna =

Italian politician

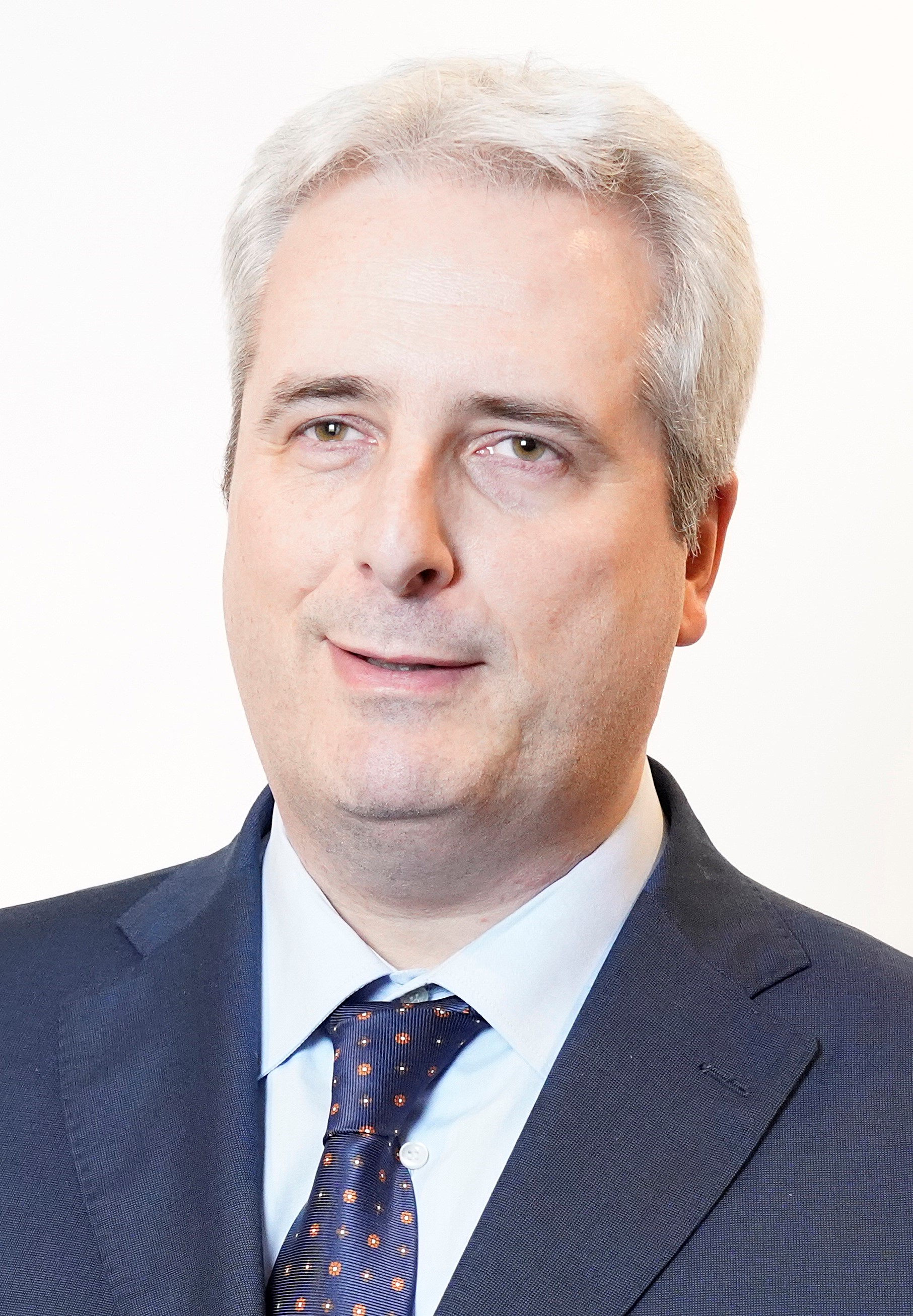

Mayor of Cuneo
- In office 23 May 2012 – 4 July 2022
- Preceded by: Alberto Valmaggia
- Succeeded by: Patrizia Manassero

President of the Province of Cuneo
- In office 13 October 2014 – 4 July 2022
- Preceded by: Gianna Gancia
- Succeeded by: Luca Robaldo

Personal details
- Born: 19 October 1973 (age 52) Cuneo, Piedmont, Italy
- Party: Centre-left independent
- Education: University of Turin
- Profession: Lawyer, accountant

Federico Borgna (born 19 October 1973) is an Italian politician.

Borgna ran as an independent for the office of mayor of Cuneo at the 2012 Italian local elections, supported by a centre-left coalition. He won and took office on 23 May 2012. He was re-elected for a second term on 16 June 2017.

He was elected president of the Province of Cuneo on 13 October 2014 and re-elected on 1 November 2018.

Borgna has been the first blind mayor of an Italian provincial capital and president of an Italian province.

== See also ==
- 2012 Italian local elections
- 2017 Italian local elections
- List of mayors of Cuneo

Political offices
Preceded by Alberto Valmaggia	Mayor of Cuneo; 2012-2022	Succeeded by Patrizia Manassero
Preceded by Gianna Gancia	President of the Province of Cuneo; 2014–2022	Succeeded by Luca Robaldo
