= Elsa Fornero =

Italian academic and politician (born 1948)

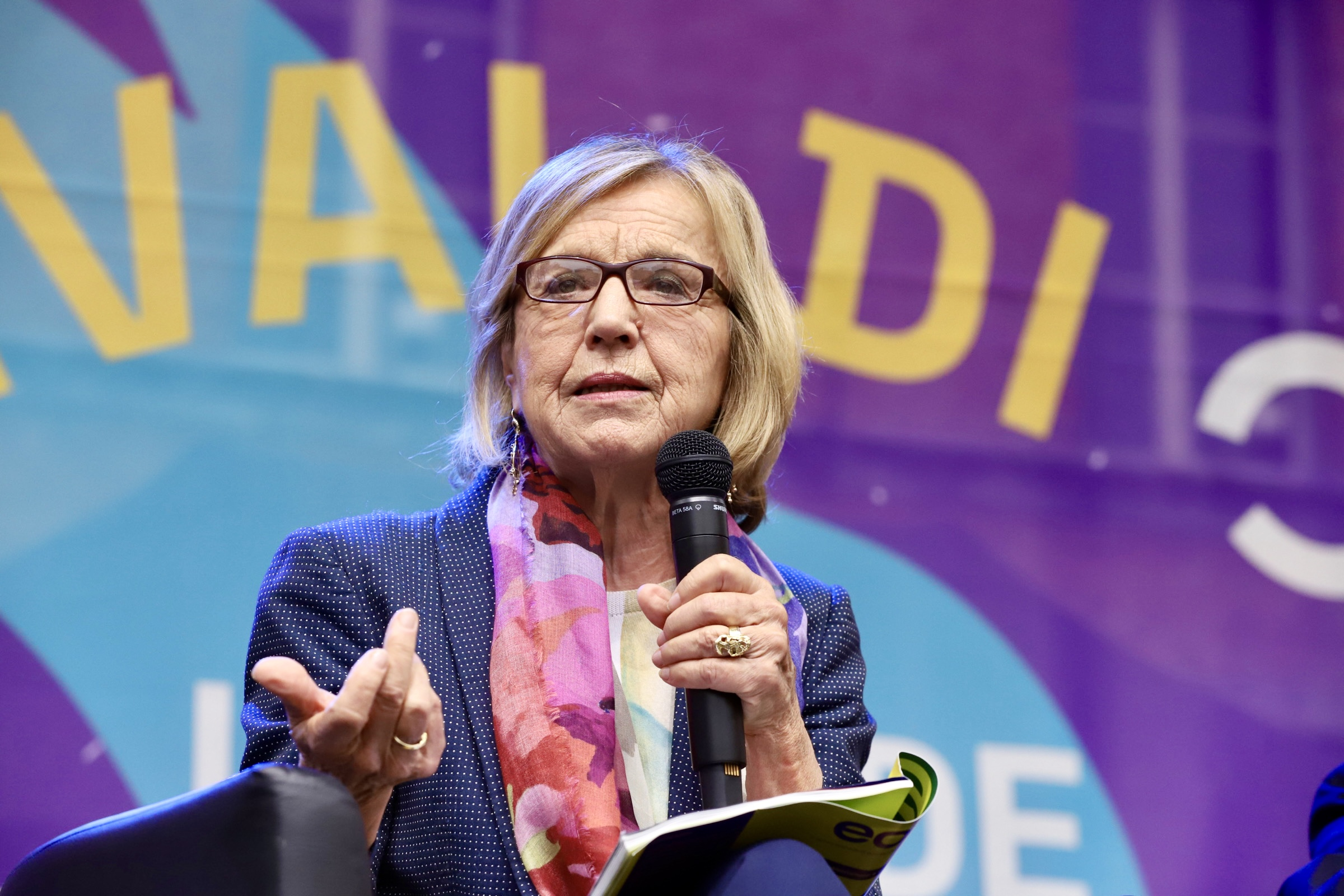
- Fornero in 2024

Minister of Labour and Social Policies
- In office 16 November 2011 – 28 April 2013
- Prime Minister: Mario Monti
- Preceded by: Maurizio Sacconi
- Succeeded by: Enrico Giovannini

Personal details
- Born: 7 May 1948 (age 77) San Carlo Canavese, Italy
- Party: Independent
- Spouse: Mario Deaglio
- Children: 2
- Occupation: Economics professor

Elsa Maria Fornero (born 7 May 1948) is an Italian economist, university lecturer, and politician who served as Minister of Labour and Social Policies in the Monti Cabinet from November 2011 to April 2013.

== Early life and education ==
Fornero was born in San Carlo Canavese, in the province of Turin, Piedmont, on 7 May 1948. Prior to becoming minister, she was professor of Political Economics at the School of Management and Economics of the University of Turin starting in 2000. She taught macroeconomics and the economics of savings, social security, and pension funds. Her scientific research focused on public and private social security systems, social security reforms, aging populations, retirement choices, family savings, and life insurance.

== Academic career ==
Fornero is a member of the doctoral board in economic sciences of the University of Turin as well as the doctoral board in social protection policy at the Maastricht Graduate School of Governance (Maastricht University). She is also a member of the evaluation unit for social security expenditure established at the Ministry of Labour and Social Policies, member of the scientific committee of the Observatoire de l'Epargne Européenne (Paris), member of the editorial board of the Rivista Italiana degli Economisti, and columnist for the economic and financial newspaper Il Sole 24 Ore. From 1993 to 1998, she was councillor to the municipality of Turin during the tenure of centre-left mayor Valentino Castellani. In 2001, she received (together with Ignazio Musu) the Saint Vincent Prize for economics. In 2003, together with Olivia Mitchell, she was granted the INA-Accademia dei Lincei award for studies in insurance matters. She also served as the Minister of Labour, Social Policies, and Equal Opportunities in Italy from 2011 until 2013.

Fornero was vice president of the Supervisory Board of Intesa Sanpaolo (2010–2011), vice president of the Compagnia di San Paolo (2008–2010), member of the board of directors of the Italian Society of Economists (2005–2007), member of the scientific committee of the General Confederation of Italian Industry (2005—2006), member of the commission of expert evaluators at the World Bank (2003—2004), member of the expert commission of the task force on "Portability of Pension Rights and Taxation of Pension Schemes in the EU" established at the CEPS (Centre for European Policy Studies) (2001–2003), member of the Ministerial Commission of Independent Experts for Social Security Verification (2001), member of the Mefop Scientific Committee (2000–2003), and non-executive independent director of Buzzi Unicem from 2008 to November 2011. She is a member of the Advisory Group of New Pact for Europe.

In 2013, Fornero received the Ezio Tarantelli Prize for "Best Economic Idea of the Year". The prize was awarded to her for having created ASPI (social employment insurance), a new social safety net that was introduced through the labour market reform that bears her name. In 2014, she joined the board of directors of the Centrale del Latte di Torino as an independent director. She held the position until 31 December 2016.

== Political career ==
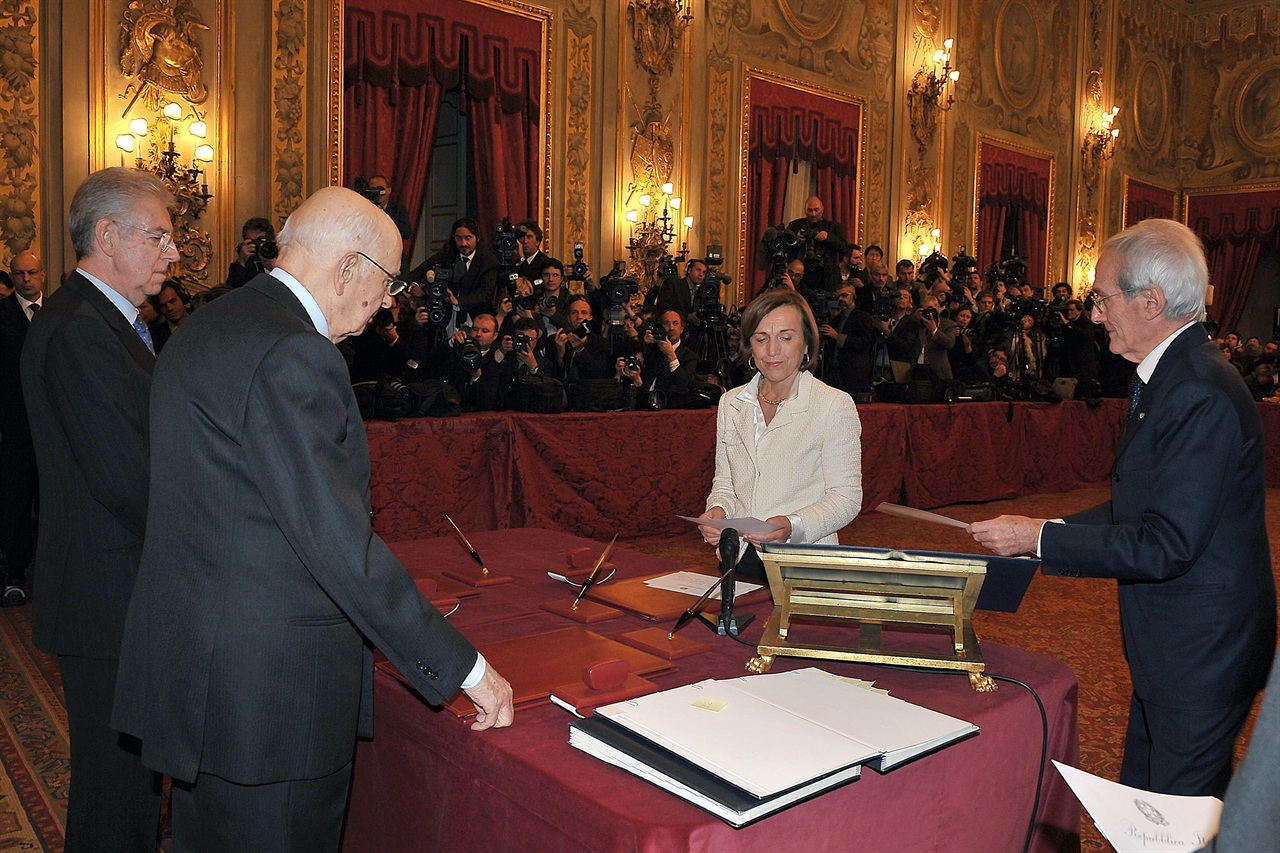
Fornero being sworn in by the president of Italy on 16 November 2011

On 16 November 2011, Fornero was appointed Minister of Labour, Social Policies, and Gender Equality, replacing Maurizio Sacconi.

=== Pension reform and exodus case ===
Fornero assumed the role of minister in the Monti government, boasting twenty years of experience in the study of public pension systems. As part of the Save Italy decree presented on 4 December 2011, the ministry presented a set of reforms of the Italian public pension system. The country needed to change laws because they were unable to pay salaries and contractors. In a moment of serious financial crisis, Fornero approved a pension reform program twenty days after she was appointed minister. The reforms contemplated a number of measures to cut public spending and increase revenue with a concomitant increase in pension contributions. The reform changed the pension system from a pay-as-you-go to a notional defined contribution (NDC) system. This reform was unpopular with many Italian citizens because it raised the retirement age requirement. Fornero also froze all pensions for two years.

The pension reform resulted in the exodus case of 2012; this affair was at the centre of political and social disputes, as well as ideological and social clashes between workers' unions and the Monti government, with various controversies in the political arena and several debates within the Confindustria. The parliamentary clash ended on 4 July 2012, when the country's Chamber of Deputies rejected a no-confidence motion filed against Fornero by the Italia dei Valori party together with the Lega Nord party.

== Controversy ==
Fornero was accused by many journalists, media, and politicians belonging to opposition parties of acting with a snobbish attitude towards the problems of common people during the economic crisis. Her statement that "nowadays, a job would not be a right anymore", as told in a Wall Street Journal interview, became quite famous.

In December 2011, shortly after her appointment to the government post, Fornero cried publicly while presenting new austerity measures.

== Personal life ==
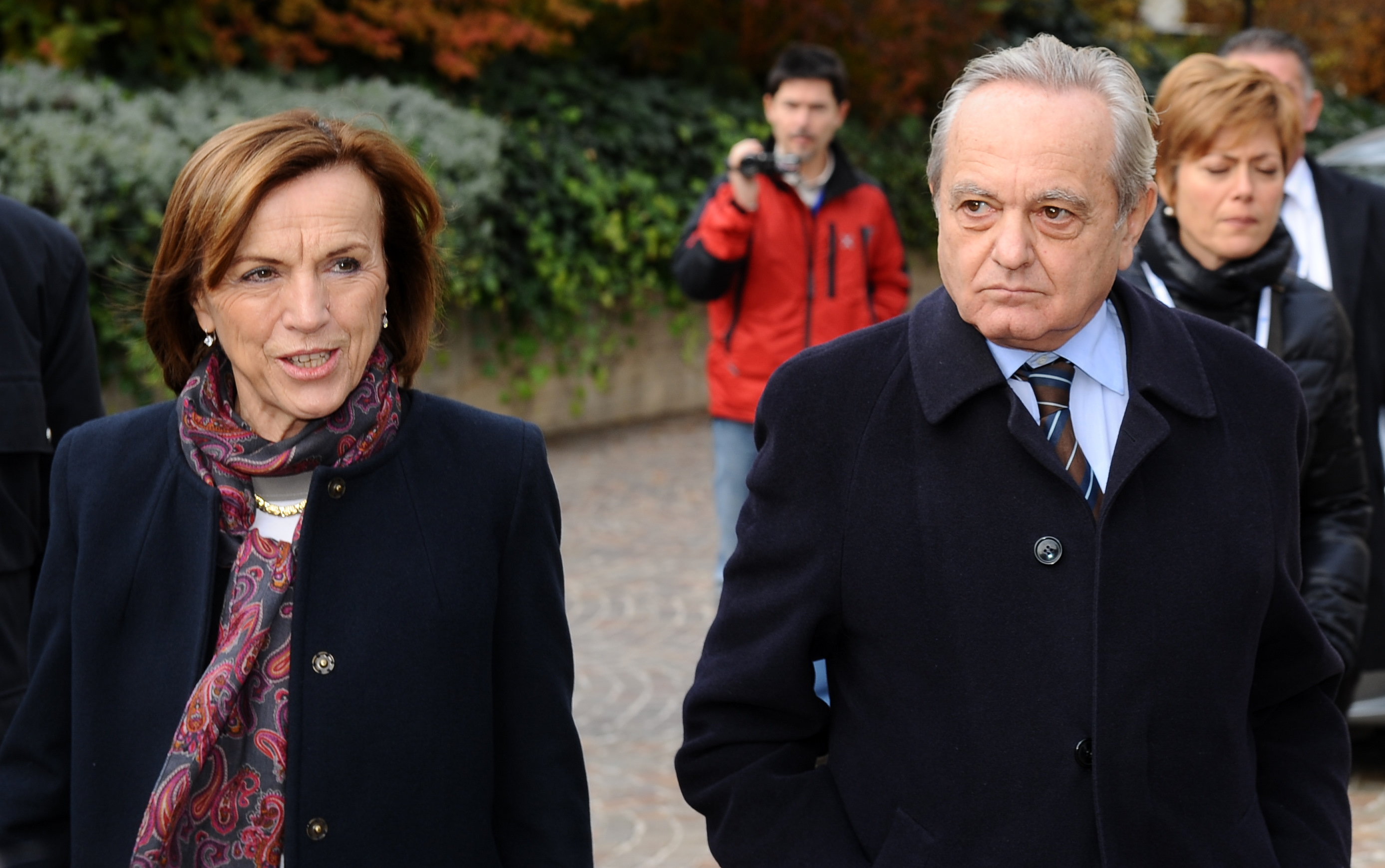
Fornero with her husband, Mario Deaglio, in Trento, 2012

Fornero is married to economist and journalist Mario Deaglio. They have two children together: Silvia Deaglio, who is an associate professor of medical genetics at the University of Turin; and Andrea Deaglio, a film director. In 2012, Silvia was criticized for teaching genetics at the same university where both her parents worked, as well as for managing a fund operated by Intesa Sanpaolo, whose vice president at the time was her mother. In November 2012, a letter was sent to the university, bearing a French stamp, containing threats against Silvia.

== Publications ==
- Che cosa si produce come e per chi. Manuale italiano di microeconomia, with Onorato Castellino, Mario Deaglio, Mario Monti, Sergio Ricossa, Giorgio Rota, Torino, Giappichelli, 1978.
- Economia del risparmio e della ricchezza. Comportamenti privati e indebitamento pubblico, with Onorato Castellino, Bologna, Il Mulino, 1990. ISBN 88-15-02788-2.
- Esercitazioni e temi d'esame di macroeconomia. Anno accademico 1995-96, with Giovanna Nicodano and Fabio Cesare Bagliano, Milano, Guerini, 1996. ISBN 88-04-00215-8.
- L'economia dei fondi pensione. Potenzialità e limiti della previdenza privata in Italia, Bologna, Il Mulino, 1999. ISBN 88-15-06798-1.
- La riforma del sistema previdenziale italiano. Opzioni e proposte, edited with Onorato Castellino, Bologna, Il Mulino, 2001. ISBN 88-15-08396-0.
- Pension policy in an integrating Europe, edited with Onorato Castellino, Cheltenham-Northampton, Edward Elgar, 2003. ISBN 1843762544.
- Developing an annuity market in Europe, edited with Elisa Luciano, Cheltenham-Northampton, Edward Elgar, 2004. ISBN 1843764768.
- Pension Systems. Beyond Mandatory Retirement, edited with Paolo Sestito, Cheltenham-Northampton, Edward Elgar, 2005. ISBN 1843769476.
- Reforming labor markets: reflections of an economist who (unexpectedly) became the Italian Minister of Labor, Iza Journal of European Labor Studies, 2013

Political offices
Preceded by Maurizio Sacconi	Minister of Labour and Social Policies; 2011–2013	Succeeded by Enrico Giovannini
