= Alliance of the Centre =

Alliance of the Centre may refer to:

- Alliance of the Centre (Italy), Italian political party founded in 2008
- Alliance of the Centre (Switzerland), Swiss political party founded in 2021
