= Antonio Milo =

Italian politician

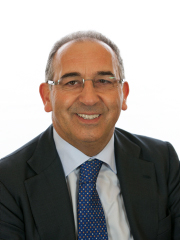

Member of the Senate
- In office 15 March 2013 – 22 March 2018
- Constituency: Campania

Member of the Chamber of Deputies
- In office 29 April 2008 – 14 March 2013
- Constituency: Campania 1

Personal details
- Born: 5 December 1959 (age 66) Agerola, Campania, Italy
- Party: DC (until 1994); PPI (1994–1995); CDU (1995–1998); CCD (1998–2002); UDC (2002–2008); MpA (2008–2010); NS (2010–present); CoR (2015–2016); ALA (2016–2018)
- Profession: Politician, entrepreneur

Antonio Milo (born 5 December 1959 in Agerola) is an Italian politician.

== Biography ==
In 1995 he was elected for the first time regional councilor in Campania, as member of the CDU (within the Forza Italia list); in 1998 it then passed to the Christian Democratic Centre (CCD), being re-elected with the latter party in the subsequent regional election of 2000.

In the 2001 general election he was a candidate for the Chamber of Deputies, on the CCD-CDU list, in the proportional Campania 1 constituency, but he was not elected because the list did not exceed the 4% threshold.

In 2002 he joined the Union of Christian and Centre Democrats (UDC) and with it he was re-elected for the third time regional councilor in the 2005 regional election.

In the 2008 political elections he was elected in the Chamber of Deputies, on the list of the Movement for Autonomy (MpA); at the same time, he resigned as regional councilor in Campania.

In January 2010, after being expelled along with five other deputies from the MpA (for not having passed to the opposition of the Berlusconi IV Cabinet, as requested by the party), he founded, together with Arturo Iannaccone, the new center-right party We the South (NS). On January 20, 2011, as a member of NS, he joined the parliamentary group Responsible Initiative (composed of the "responsible" deputies for supporting the Berlusconi government).

In the 2013 general election he was elected to the Senate of the Republic, on the People of Freedom (PdL) list. He initially joined the parliamentary group of the PdL, then passed on 4 December 2013 to the parliamentary group "Great Autonomies and Freedom (GAL).

On 30 May 2015 he left the GAL group to join the Conservatives and Reformists (CoR), the new party of Raffaele Fitto.

On 1 May 2016 he also left CoR to join the Liberal Popular Alliance – Autonomies (ALA) group, a centrist formation of senators led by Denis Verdini who left the centre-right to support the Renzi and Gentiloni governments.
