= Antonio Toselli =

Italian engineer and politician

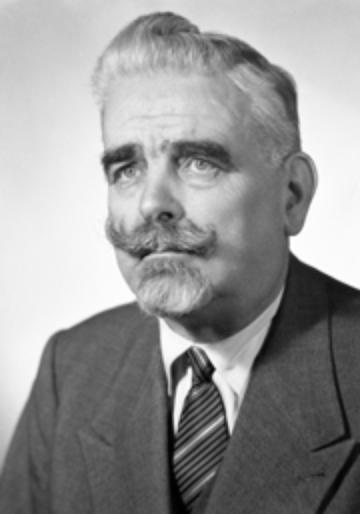
Antonio Toselli

Antonio Toselli (20 October 1884 – 2 June 1954) was an Italian engineer and politician, who served as Mayor of Cuneo from 1946 to 1948 and as Senator for two legislatures (1948–1953, 1953–1954).
