= Maurizio Sacconi =

Italian politician (born 1950)

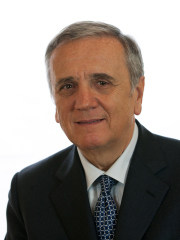

Minister of Labour and Social Security
- In office 2 May 2008 – 16 November 2011
- Prime Minister: Silvio Berlusconi
- Preceded by: Cesare Damiano
- Succeeded by: Elsa Fornero

Member of the Senate
- In office 28 April 2006 – 22 March 2018

Member of the Chamber of Deputies
- In office 20 June 1979 – 14 April 1994

Personal details
- Born: 13 July 1950 (age 75) Conegliano, Italy
- Party: Energies for Italy (2017-2020)
- Other political affiliations: Italian Socialist Party (1979-1994); Forza Italia (2001-2009); The People of Freedom (2009-2013); New Centre-right (2013-2017)

Maurizio Sacconi (Conegliano, 13 July 1950) is an Italian politician from Veneto. A long-time member of the Italian Socialist Party, from 1979 to 1994 he was a member of the Italian Chamber of Deputies and from 1987 to 1994 he served also as Under-Secretary of the Treasury. Between 1981 and 1984 he was the first president of Legambiente, the largest environmentalist association in Italy. From 1995 to 2001 he was branch office director of the International Labour Organization.

In 2001 Sacconi joined Forza Italia and was appointed Under-Secretary of Labour in Silvio Berlusconi's governments. After five years in office as deputy of Minister Roberto Maroni, he was elected senator in 2006 and re-elected in 2008.

He served as Minister of Labour and Social Security in Berlusconi IV Cabinet (2009–2011).

Political offices
Preceded by Cesare Damiano (Labour); Livia Turco (Health); Paolo Ferrero (Social affairs)	Italian Minister of Labour, Health and Social Affairs; 2008–2009	Succeeded by himself as Italian Minister of Labour and Social Affairs; Ferruccio Fazio as Italian Minister of Health
Preceded by himself as Italian Minister of Labour, Health and Social Affairs	Italian Minister of Labour and Social Affairs; 2009–2011	Succeeded by Elsa Fornero
Italian Senate
Preceded by Title jointly held	Senator; Legislatures; XV, XVI, XVII; 2006–2018	Succeeded by Title jointly held
Italian Chamber of Deputies
Preceded by Title jointly held	Deputy; Legislatures; VIII, IX, X, XI; 1979–1994	Succeeded by Title jointly held
