= Enrico Giovannini =

Italian economist and statistician

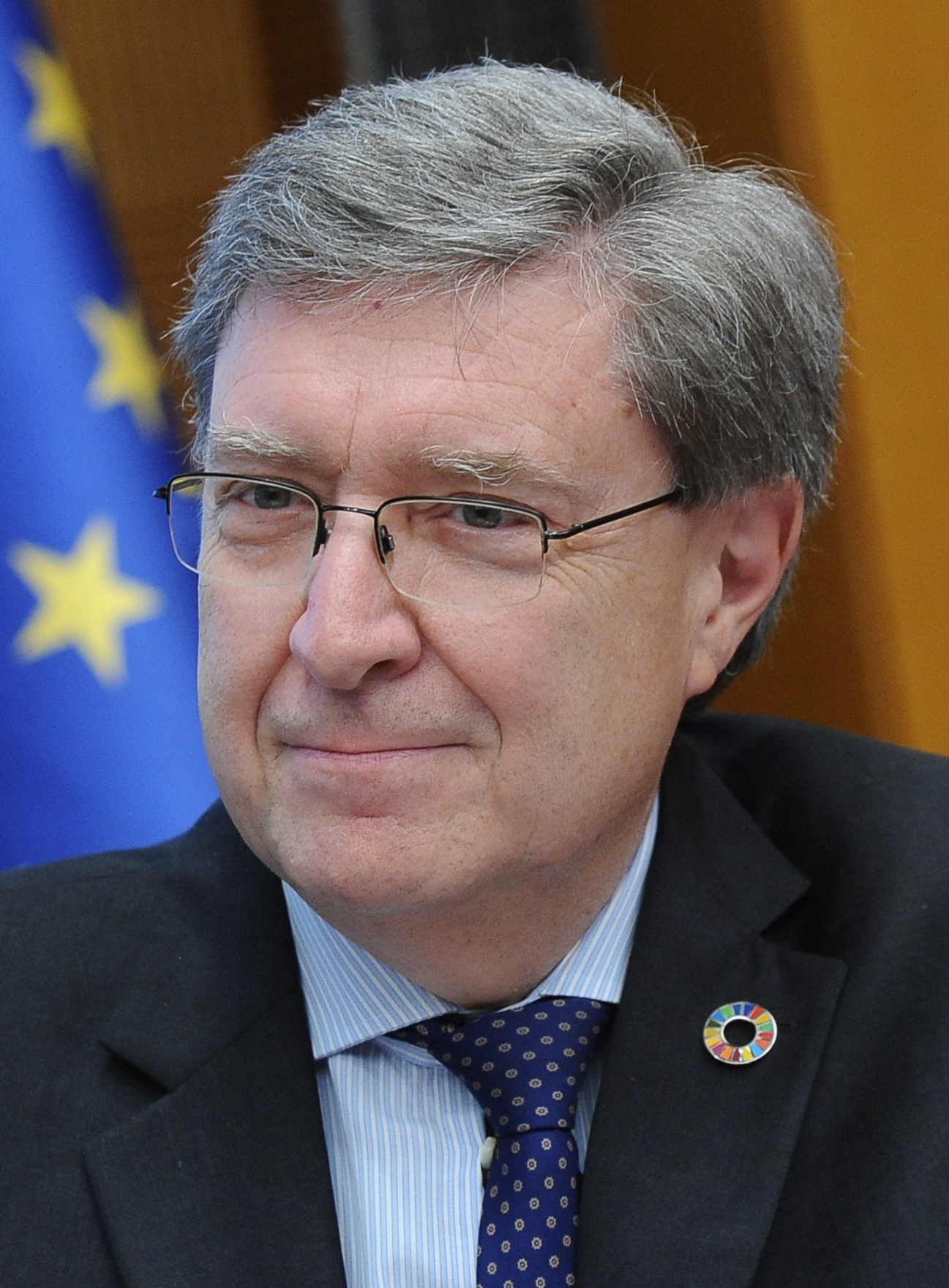

Minister of Infrastructure and Sustainable Mobility
- In office 13 February 2021 – 22 October 2022
- Prime Minister: Mario Draghi
- Preceded by: Paola De Micheli
- Succeeded by: Matteo Salvini

Minister of Labour and Social Policies
- In office 28 April 2013 – 22 February 2014
- Prime Minister: Enrico Letta
- Preceded by: Elsa Fornero
- Succeeded by: Giuliano Poletti

President of the National Institute of Statistics
- In office 24 July 2009 – 28 April 2013
- Preceded by: Luigi Biggeri
- Succeeded by: Antonio Golini

Personal details
- Born: 6 June 1957 (age 69) Rome, Italy
- Party: Independent
- Children: 2
- Education: Sapienza University of Rome

Enrico Giovannini (born 6 June 1957) is an Italian economist, statistician and academic, member of the Club of Rome. Since February 2021, he has been serving as Minister of Infrastructure and Sustainable Mobility in the Draghi Government. From April 2013 to February 2014, he served as Minister of Labour and Social Policies in the Letta Government. From 2009 to 2013, he held the office of President of the Italian National Institute of Statistics (Istat).

== Professional career ==
Enrico Giovannini was born in Rome in 1957. In 1981, he received a bachelor's degree with honours in Economics at the Sapienza University of Rome, where he defended a thesis on "Technologies and combinations of factors in developing countries." He continued his post-graduate education at the Institute of Economic Policy at the Sapienza University in the field of applied economic analysis, with a focus on the statistical/econometric analysis of the business cycle.

In 1982, he joined the Italian National Institute of Statistics (Istat) as a researcher, focusing on national accounts and economic analysis. From 1989 to 1991, he was research director at the ISCO-National Institute for Studies on Economic Cycles, where he concentrated on financial/monetary economic analysis. In 1992 he returned to Istat, and in 1993 he was appointed Director of the Division of National Accounts and Economic Analysis. In 1997, he was appointed Director of the Department of Economic Statistics at Istat, serving in this position until he was appointed Chief Statistician at OECD.

Giovannini was a consultant of the Ministry of Treasury and of the Italian Manufacturers’ Association for the development of their econometric models. During his career, he took part in several national and international committees, including the Council of the Interuniversity Committee for Econometrics (CIDE) and the Council of the Italian Statistical Society. He was member of the high-level Committee for the introduction of euro in Italy established by the Ministry of Treasury.

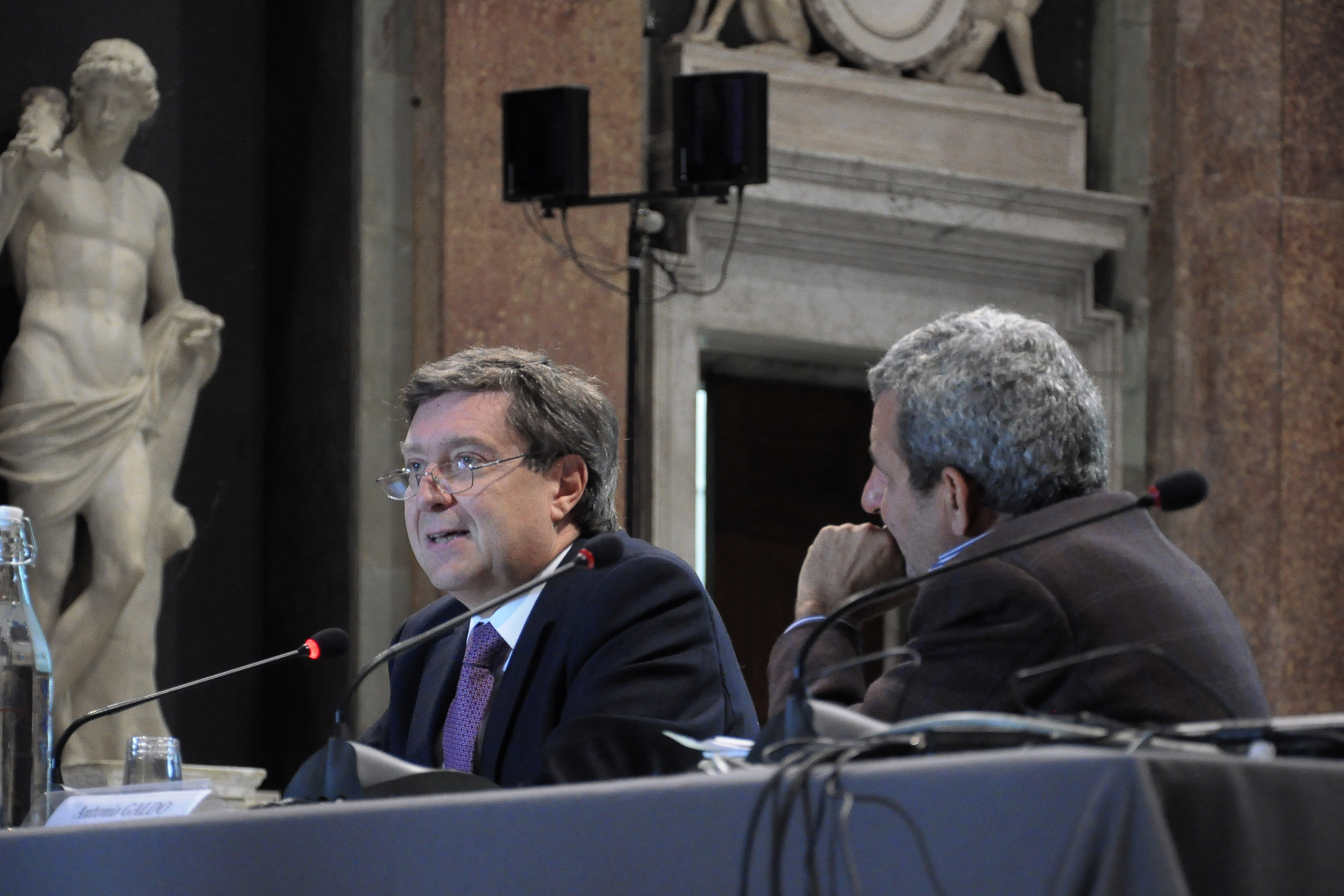
Giovannini speaks in Genoa during a conference, 2011

From January 2001 to July 2009, he was Chief Statistician and Director of the Statistics Directorate of the Organisation for Economic Co-operation and Development (OECD) in Paris. As Chief Statistician he designed and implemented a thorough reform of the statistical system of the organization and launched the "Global Project on the Measurement of Progress in Societies", which fostered the setting up of numerous worldwide initiatives on the issue "Beyond GDP". He also established the "World Forum on Statistics, Knowledge and Politics", organising the first editions of the Forum, held in Italy (2004), Turkey (2007) and South Korea (2009). In particular, at the end of the 2007 Forum the "Istanbul Declaration" on "Beyond GDP" was signed by the OECD, the European Commission, the United Nations, the United Nations Development Programme, the Organisation of the Islamic Conference, the World Bank and several other institutions.

During these years, Giovannini was also a member of several important international bodies: Chair of the Conference of European Statisticians, a body of the United Nations Economic Commission for Europe (UNECE), Chair of the Board of the World Bank International Comparison Program for the measurement of purchasing power parities worldwide, advisor to the European Commissioner for the Environment and member of the Board of the Canadian Index of Wellbeing and of the UK Measuring National Wellbeing Advisory Forum. He has also been a member of the "Stiglitz Commission", established by French President Nicolas Sarkozy and Chair of the Global Council on "Benchmarking of Societal Progress" established by the World Economic Forum. For his work on the measurement of societal well-being, in 2010, he was awarded the Gold Medal of the President of the Republic of Italy by the Pio Manzù International Center and became a member of the Club of Rome.

Since 2002, he is a Professor of Economic Statistics at the Economics and Finance Department of the University of Rome Tor Vergata. Since 2014 he is Senior Fellow of the LUISS "School of European Political Economy".

=== President of Istat ===
In August 2009 he was nominated President of the Italian National Institute of Statistics. Under his leadership, Istat undertook a wide range of innovative initiatives aimed at improving the quality of Italian statistics, as well as to improve the dissemination and the communication of data. Especially important has been the launch of the initiative to measure "Equitable and Sustainable Well-Being" through a set of indicators, also available at regional level. From June 2011 to April 2013 he was Chair of the Conference of European Statisticians, a body of the United Nations Economic Commission for Europe (UNECE), and Chair of the Board of the World Bank International Comparison Programme for the measurement of purchasing power parities worldwide.

== Minister of Labour ==
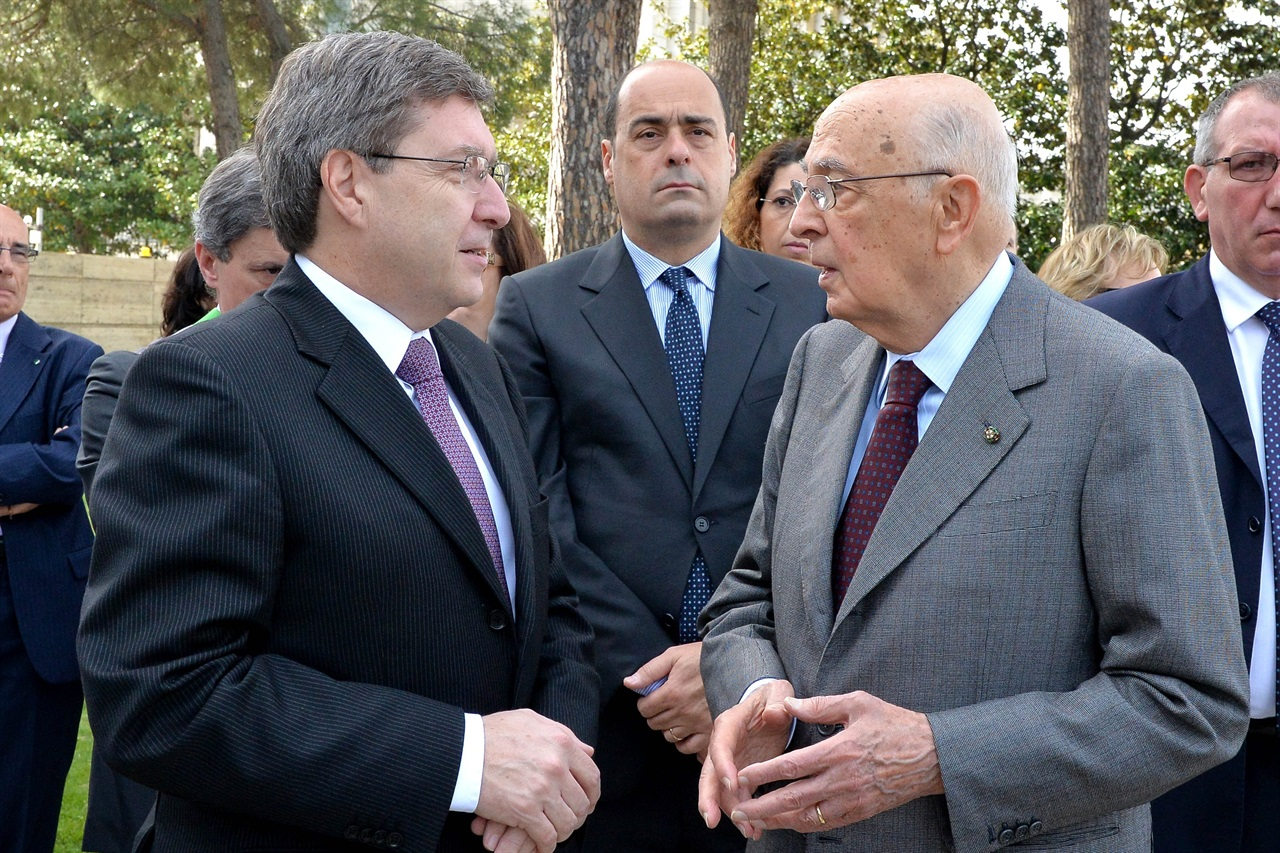
Enrico Giovannini with President Giorgio Napolitano, 2013

On 28 April 2013 Giovannini was appointed Minister of Labour and Social Policies in the cabinet led by Enrico Letta. It was the so-called Grand coalition government, with support from the centre-left Democratic Party (of which Letta was Deputy Secretary), the centre-right People of Freedom, of former Prime Minister Silvio Berlusconi, and the centrist Civic Choice. Letta's government became the first in the history of the Italian Republic to include representatives of all the major candidate-coalitions that had competed in the election.

On 14 June 2013 Giovannini participated in a summit at Palazzo Chigi, promoted by Prime Minister Letta, with Ministers of Economy and Labour of Italy, Germany, France and Spain on the issue of youth unemployment. On 15 June, the government issues the "Decree of doing," measure aimed at hiring policies for economic recovery, of which Giovannini was among the main proponents.

As minister, Giovannini also simplified the apprenticeship, with the aim of accelerating the enter in the world of work for young people.

However, the growing criticism of the slow pace of Italian economic reform left the government increasingly isolated. On 13 February 2014, following tensions with his left-wing rival Matteo Renzi, Letta announced he would resign as Prime Minister the following day. The Democratic Party voted heavily in favour of backing Renzi's call for a new government, a "new phase" and a "radical programme" of reform. Minutes after the PD national committee backed the Renzi's proposal by 136 votes to 16, with two abstentions, Palazzo Chigi – the official residence of the prime minister – said Letta would be going to the Quirinale on Friday to tender his resignation to Giorgio Napolitano. In a speech earlier, Renzi had paid tribute to Letta's government, saying the meeting was not intended to put it "on trial". But, without directly proposing himself as the next premier, he said the eurozone's third-largest economy urgently needed "a new phase" and "radical programme" to push through reforms. The motion made clear "the necessity and urgency of opening a new phase with a new executive". Speaking to the party leadership, Renzi had said Italy was "at a crossroads" and faced either holding fresh elections or a new government without a return to the polls. On 14 February 2014 Giorgio Napolitano accepted Letta's resignation from the office of Prime Minister and Giovannini was succeeded by Giuliano Poletti as new Minister of Labour and Social Policies.

== After the Letta's government: the Italian Alliance for Sustainable Development (ASviS) ==
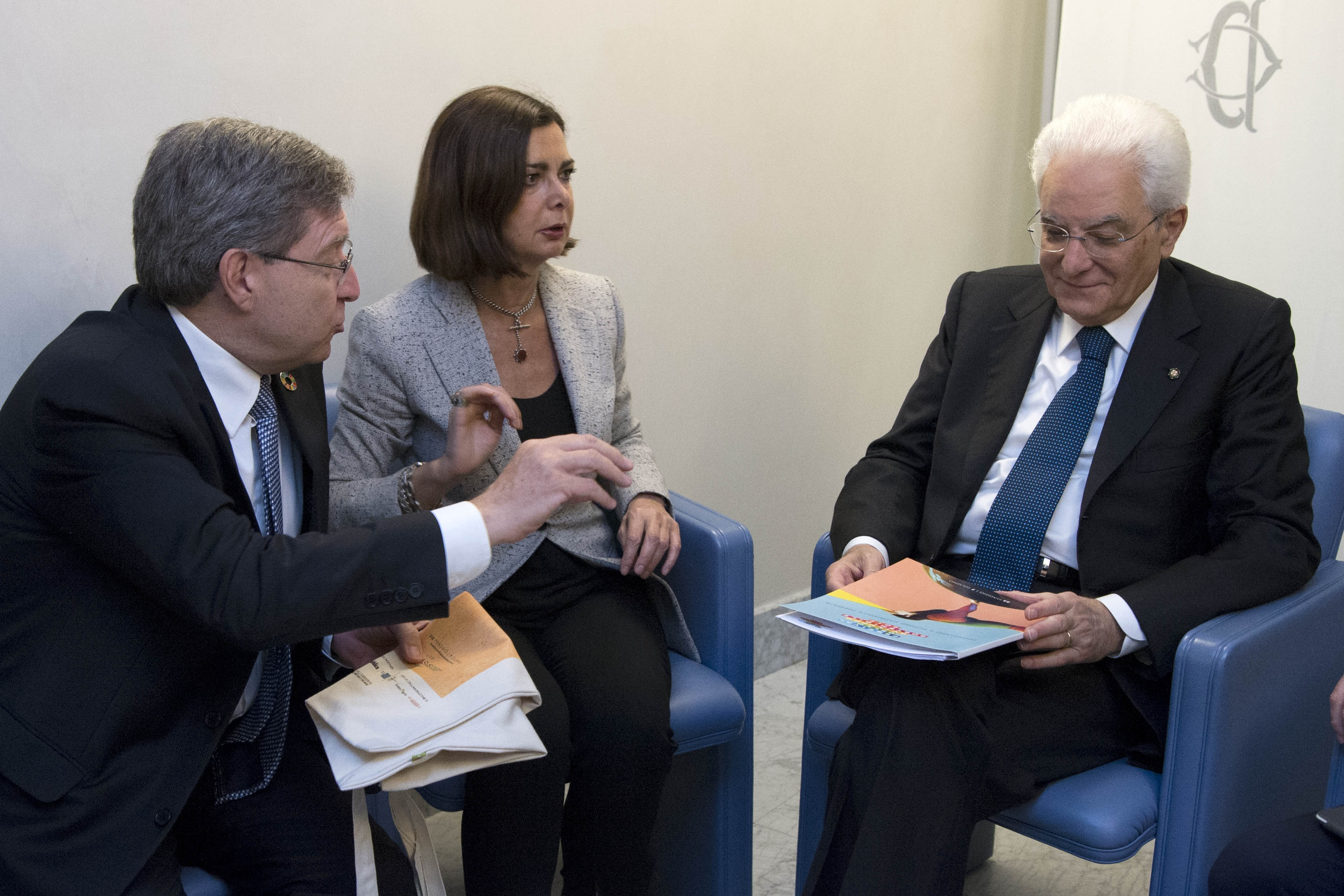
Giovannini with Laura Boldrini and President Sergio Mattarella in 2017

After the fall of Letta's government, Giovannini returned to his academic career. He is currently co-chair of the "Independent Expert Advisory Group on the Data Revolution for Sustainable Development", established by the Secretary General of the United Nations, co-chair of the Statistical Advisory Panel for the Human Development Report of the United Nations and co-chair, along with Joseph Stiglitz, of the Strategic Forum on the measurement of well-being, joint initiative of the International Statistical Institute and of the International Economic Association.

Giovannini serves also as chair of the Advisory Boards of European Projects E-Frame and Web-COSI, member of the High-Level Expert Group on the Measurement of Economic Performance and Social Progress established by the OECD, member of the Council of the International Statistical Institute (ISI), member of the "Commission Economique de la Nation" of the French Government, as well as member of the Board of the "Agnelli Foundation", of the "Enel Foundation", of the "Aurelio Peccei Foundation", of the "Save the Children – Italy", of the "WWF – Italy".

During these years he became a strong advocate of sustainable development and green economy, on which we wrote many articles and books. In October 2015, he proposed creating the Italian Alliance for Sustainable Development (ASviS) with the UNIPOLIS Foundation and the University of Rome "Tor Vergata." Officially established on February 3, 2016, ASviS aims to raise awareness and mobilize efforts in Italy to achieve the Sustainable Development Goals. The Alliance unites over 220 key organizations, including business and trade unions, civil society networks focused on specific SDGs (e.g., health, education, environment), local public administrations, universities, research centers, cultural and media associations, foundations, and Italian members of international SDG networks.

== Minister of Infrastructure and Sustainable Mobility ==
In February 2021, in the midst of the COVID-19 pandemic, the former President of the European Central Bank, Mario Draghi, was invited by Italian President Sergio Mattarella to form a government of national unity, following the resignation of Giuseppe Conte.

On 13 February, Enrico Giovannini was appointed Minister of Infrastructure and Mobility, a position he held until October 22, 2022. At his proposal, on February 26, 2021, the Ministry was renamed the Ministry of Infrastructure and Sustainable Mobility, following approval by the Council of Ministers. This renaming was intended to signal a paradigm shift, strongly emphasizing a focus on sustainability and aligning fully with the development vision promoted by European policies and the principles of the Next Generation EU.

== Authored books ==
- Fabbisogno pubblico, politica monetaria e mercati finanziari. Rome: FrancoAngeli. 1992. ISBN 978-88-20-47818-6.
- Le statistiche economiche. Rome: Il Mulino. 2006. ISBN 978-88-15-25940-0.
- Understanding economic statistics. Rome: OECD. 2008. ISBN 978-92-64-03312-2.
- Scegliere il futuro. Conoscenza e Politica al tempo dei Big Data. Rome: Il Mulino. 2014. ISBN 978-88-15-24739-1.
- L'utopia sostenbile. Rome: Laterza. 2018. ISBN 978-88-58-13076-6.

Political offices
Preceded by Elsa Fornero	Italian Minister of Labour and Social Policies; 2013–2014	Succeeded by Giuliano Poletti
