= Ferruccio Fazio =

Italian physician and politician (born 1944)

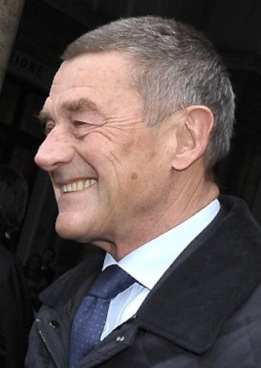

Mayor of Garessio
- In office 28 May 2019 – 11 June 2024
- Preceded by: Sergio Di Steffano
- Succeeded by: Luciano Sciandra

Minister of Health
- In office 15 December 2009 – 16 November 2011
- Prime Minister: Silvio Berlusconi
- Preceded by: Maurizio Sacconi
- Succeeded by: Renato Balduzzi

Personal details
- Born: 7 August 1944 (age 82) Garessio
- Party: Independent
- Spouse: Margherita Colnaghi
- Children: Alessandro; Arianna
- Education: University of Pisa
- Website: Official website

Ferruccio Fazio (born 7 August 1944) is an Italian politician and was the minister of health from 2009 to 2011 in the fourth cabinet of Silvio Berlusconi.

== Early life and education ==
Fazio was born in Garessio on 7 August 1944. He studied medicine.

== Career ==
Fazio is a professor of diagnostic imaging and radiotherapy at University of Milan Bicocca. He was also the director of nuclear medicine and radiation oncology at Vita-Salute San Raffaele University in Milan.

He served as undersecretary for health until his appointment as vice minister of health on 21 May 2008. During his tenure as undersecretary, he was responsible for struggle against the bird flu. Then he served as the vice minister until his appointment as minister of health in December 2009. His tenure ended in November 2011, and Renato Balduzzi replaced him as health minister.

In May 2019 Fazio is elected mayor of Garessio.

== Personal life ==
Fazio is married and has two children, a daughter and a son.
