= Giuseppe Menardi =

Italian politician (born 1953)

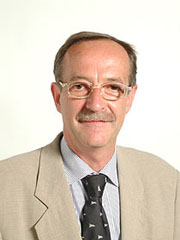
Giuseppe Menardi in 2001

Giuseppe Menardi (born 1 July 1953) is an Italian politician who served as Mayor of Cuneo from 1990 to 1995 and as Senator for three legislatures (2001–2006, 2006–2008, 2008–2013).

== Biography ==
He was among the senators who, after resigning from the PdL caucus, joined the new parliamentary caucus Future and Freedom on September 2, 2010, led by Gianfranco Fini, President of the Chamber of Deputies. On February 16, 2011, he announced that he was leaving the “Future and Freedom for Italy” caucus to return to the governing majority. On February 26, 2011, he announced that he was joining the parliamentary group supporting the governing majority and aligned with the center-right political and cultural bloc of National Cohesion (Io Sud and Forza del Sud). His term in Parliament ended in 2013.

Ahead of the formation of the Draghi government in 2021, he, along with 23 other former members of AN, appealed to Giorgia Meloni Fratelli d’Italia to change its mind and support the government—though to no avail.
