= Alliance of the Centre (Italy) =

Alliance of the Centre Alleanza di Centro
- Secretary: Francesco Pionati
- Deputy Secretary: Mario Pietracupa
- Founded: 4 December 2008
- Dissolved: 2022
- Split from: Union of the Centre
- Merged into: Us with Italy
- Headquarters: Via dei Prefetti, 46 Rome
- Ideology: Christian democracy
- Political position: Centre to centre-right
- National affiliation: Coalition: Centre-right coalition (2008–present); Electoral list: The Autonomy (2009)

Website
- www.alleanzadicentro.it

Alliance of the Centre (Italian: Alleanza di Centro, AdC), whose full name is Alliance of the Centre for the Territories (Italian: Alleanza di Centro per i Territori), was a Christian-democratic political party in Italy.

It was founded in November 2008 as Alliance of the Centre for Freedom (Italian: Alleanza di Centro per la Libertà) by splinters from the Union of the Centre (UdC) who wanted to return to an alliance with Silvio Berlusconi's centre-right coalition and support his fourth government. Its leader is Francesco Pionati, deputy and formerly spokesman of the UdC.

At the 2009 European Parliament election, AdC was part of The Autonomy, an electoral coalition including The Right, the Movement for the Autonomies and the Pensioners' Party, which gained 2.2% of the vote and no MEPs. In the 2010 general regional elections AdC ran its lists in a handful of regions, electing only one regional councillor in Pionati's homeregion, Campania (2.35%). In the 2011 Molise regional election the party got the 6.73% of the vote and 2 seats in the Regional Council.

On 20 January 2011, AdC was a founding component of Responsible Initiative (later renamed People and Territory), a centre-right group in the Italian Chamber of Deputies during the 16th Legislature. In October 2012, the balance of accounts of the People of Freedom (PdL) showed that the Alliance of the Centre had received €80,000 of financial support from PdL.

The party was renamed Alliance of the Centre for the Territories in July 2019.

Pionati would later join Maurizio Lupi’s Us with Italy party, becoming a member of the party’s executive committee and steering committee.

== Leadership ==
- Secretary: Francesco Pionati
