= National Cohesion =

Italian political party

National Cohesion Coesione Nazionale
- Chamber: Italian Senate
- Foundation: 2 March 2011
- Dissolution: 14 March 2013
- Ideology: Regionalism; Christian democracy Liberal conservatism
- Political position: Centre-right

National Cohesion (Coesione Nazionale, CN) was a centre-right parliamentary group active in the Italian Senate.

Launched on 2 March 2011, the group was supportive of Berlusconi IV Cabinet. The group's president was Pasquale Viespoli, formerly leader of Future and Freedom in the Senate, and its counterpart in the Chamber of Deputies was People and Territory. Most of its members were elected in Southern Italy.

From 5 May to 12 November 2011 the group was represented in government by Riccardo Villari, under-secretary at the Ministry of Culture.

== Composition ==
The group included:

- former members of Future and Freedom (Future and Freedom, FLI)
  - ideology: National conservatism, liberal conservatism
  - leader: Pasquale Viespoli
  - 3 senators: Giuseppe Menardi, Maurizio Saia, Pasquale Viespoli
- Force of the South (Forza del Sud, FdS)
  - ideology: Liberal conservatism, regionalism
  - leader: Gianfranco Micciché
  - 3 senators: Roberto Centaro, Mario Ferrara, Salvo Fleres
- The Populars of Italy Tomorrow (I Popolari di Italia Domani, PID)
  - ideology: Christian democracy, regionalism
  - leader: Francesco Saverio Romano
  - 1 senator: Maria Giuseppa Castiglione
- I the South (Io Sud, IS)
  - ideology: National conservatism, centrism, regionalism
  - leader: Adriana Poli Bortone
  - 1 senator: Adriana Poli Bortone
- 3 senators of The People of Freedom (PdL) who joined the group for technical reasons:
  - Valerio Carrara, Elio Massimo Palmizio, Salvatore Piscitelli
- 2 independent senators:
  - Alberto Filippi (ex-Lega Nord)
  - Riccardo Villari (ex-DC/PPI/CDU/UDEUR/DL/PD/MpA)
