= Italian National Institute of Statistics =

Coordinates: 41°53′57″N 12°29′45″E

Istat

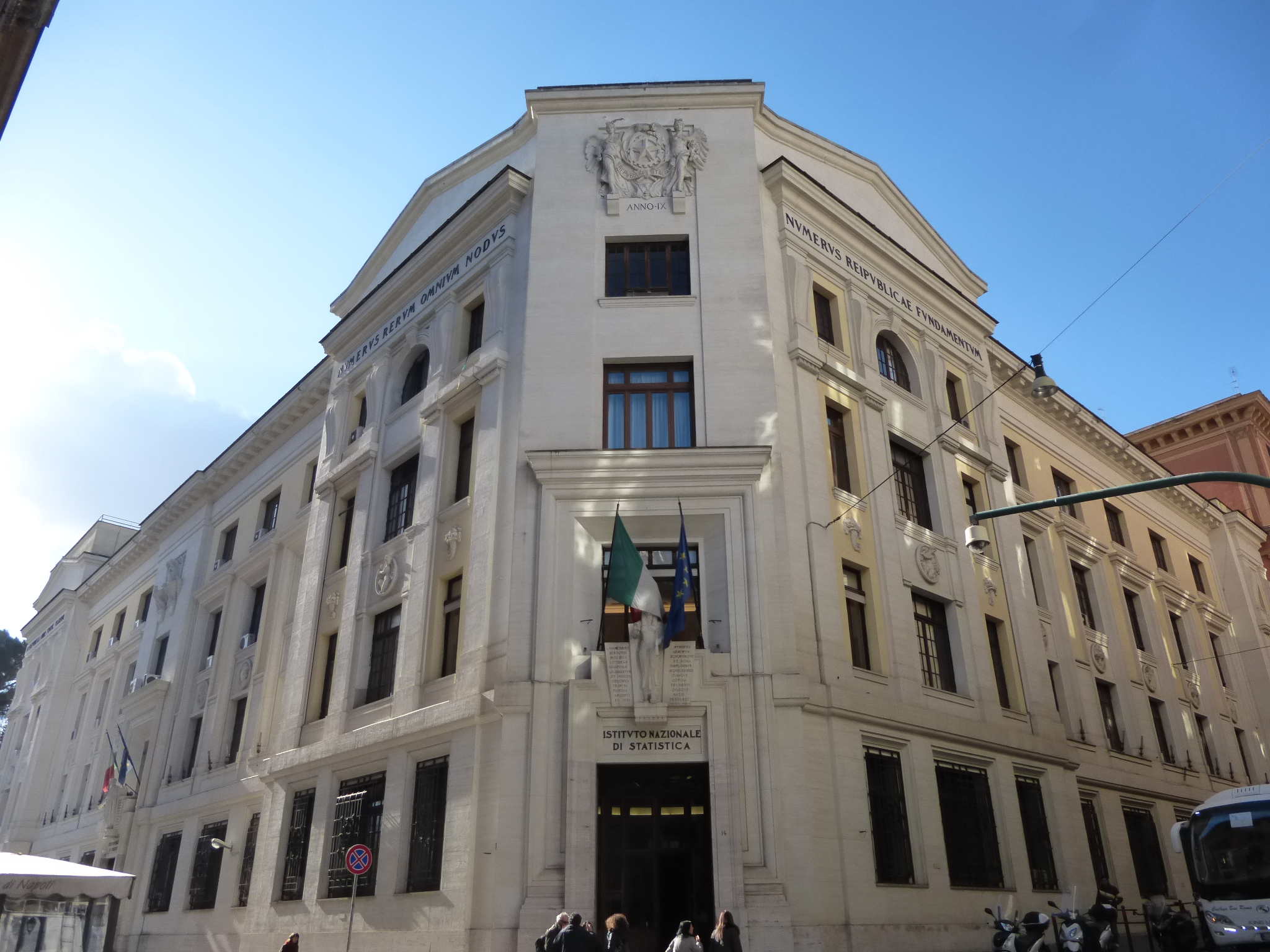
- Istat headquarters in Rome

Institute overview
- Formed: 1926
- Jurisdiction: Government of Italy
- Headquarters: Rome, Italy
- Institute executive: Gian Carlo Blangiardo, President
- Website: www.istat.it/en/

The Italian National Institute of Statistics (Italian: Istituto nazionale di statistica; Istat) is the primary source of official statistics in Italy. The institute conducts a variety of activities, including the census of population, economic censuses, and numerous social, economic, and environmental surveys and analyses. Istat is the largest producer of statistical information in Italy and is actively involved in the European Statistical System, which is overseen by Eurostat.

== History ==
The Italian National Institute of Statistics (Istat) was established by Legislative decree no. 1162 on 9 July 1926 as the Central Institute of Statistics (Istituto centrale di statistica) in order to replace the General Statistics Division of the Ministry of Agriculture. The first director of the institute was Corrado Gini, who was appointed under the authority of the head of state.

The institute, with a staff of about 170 workers, was charged with publishing the data of the 6th general population census, generated by updating the figures from previous censuses carried out by the General Statistics Division up until 1921. After ramping up activities in the early 1930s, national statistics operations in Italy suffered serious setbacks due to economic sanctions imposed as a result of the Second Italo-Ethiopian War, which essentially halted any publication of economic or financial data. The figures that had been already collected but not reported during this period were eventually published in 1937, although this activity was ceased only two years afterwards.

After the outbreak of the Second World War, publications decreased due to the lack of personnel, most of whom had been called up for military service. This led to a postponement of the 9th population census, which was instead held in 1951. Due to the Armistice of Cassibile in 1943, the institute headquarters were relocated within the territory of the Italian Social Republic.

During the late 1940s, the archives were recovered and transferred back to Rome, allowing the institute to fully resume its activities. With post-war reconstruction underway, the institute mainly focused on collecting new data concerning national development that eventually lead to the publication of the volume "Studi sul reddito nazionale" (Studies on National Revenue) in 1950.

Legislative decree no. 322, published on 6 September 1989, established the National Statistics System (Sistema statistico nazionale, Sistan) and changed the name of the institution to the National Institute of Statistics (Istituto nazionale di statistica), without changing its acronym, which remained Istat. Institute publications are released under a Creative Commons "Attribution" (CC BY) license.

== Organization ==
The administration of the institute is as follows:

- President, appointed by the President of Italy upon the proposal of the president of the Council of Ministers (the Prime Minister of Italy) after the approval of the Council of Ministers. Their term lasts for four years and can be renewed only once. They are responsible for the performance of the institute and its technical and scientific coordination.
- Policy-making and Statistics Information Coordination Committee, whose term lasts for four years, made up of 15 members including the president, carries out steering duties.
- Governing Board, which directs and oversees every activity carried out by the institute. The Governing Board consists of the President as well as of nine other members.
- Board of Auditors, which makes sure that account statements align with previous accounting records. Its term lasts for three years and consists of a member of the Council of State who serves as its president, as well as a representative from the Presidency of the Council of Ministers and one from the Ministry of Economy and Finance.

=== Presidents ===
Central Institute of Statistics (Istituto Centrale di Statistica) (until 1989):

- Alberto Canaletti Gaudenti (1945–1949)
- Lanfranco Maroi (1949–1961)
- Giuseppe De Meo (1961–1980)
- Guido Maria Rey (1980–1989)

National Institute of Statistics (Istituto Nazionale di Statistica) (since 1989):

- Guido Maria Rey (1989–1993)
- Alberto Zuliani (1993–2001)
- Luigi Biggeri (2001–2009)
- Enrico Giovannini (2009–2013)
- Antonio Golini (2013–2014)
- Giorgio Alleva (2014–2018)
- Gian Carlo Blangiardo (since 2019)

== Access points ==
=== Information offices ===
Istat has 18 regional offices, called Centri di informazione statistica (Statistical Information Centers), where the public can access statistical information. The center in Rome also offers data from Eurostat.

=== Library ===
The library, established in 1926, is open to the public and contains Istat publications, national and international works on statistics and socioeconomics, and journals from other national statistical institutes and international organizations (e.g. Food and Agriculture Organization, International Monetary Fund, OECD, United Nations). The library collection includes 400,000 volumes and receives about 2800 periodical journals. There are also 1500 volumes published prior to 1900.

=== Databases and Information system ===
Istat provides databases and web interfaces for browsing and downloading data produced by the institute. Accessing and downloading of data and information is free and available through dati.istat.it, seriestoriche.istat.it, and other web interfaces.
