= Patrizia Manassero =

Italian politician

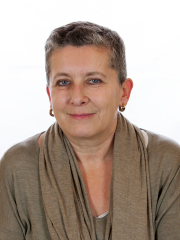

Mayor of Cuneo
- Incumbent
- Assumed office 4 July 2022
- Preceded by: Federico Borgna

Member of the Italian Senate
- In office 15 March 2013 – 22 March 2018

Personal details
- Born: 1 October 1960 (age 65) Cuneo, Piedmont, Italy
- Party: Democratic Party

Patrizia Manassero (born 1 October 1960) is an Italian politician who served as Senator from 2013 to 2018.

She was elected Mayor of Cuneo at the 2022 Italian local elections, the first woman in the city's history.
