= Guido Bonino =

Italian politician (1931–2022)

Member of the Regional Council of Piedmont
- In office 1988–1990

President of the Province of Cuneo
- In office 1985–1988
- Preceded by: ?
- Succeeded by: Giovanni Quaglia

Mayor of Cuneo
- In office 1976–1985
- Preceded by: Tancredi Dotta Rosso
- Succeeded by: Elvio Viano

Personal details
- Born: 11 May 1931 Savigliano, Italy
- Died: 27 May 2022 (aged 91) Borgo San Dalmazzo, Italy
- Party: Christian Democracy; Italian People's Party

Guido Bonino (11 May 1931 – 27 May 2022) was an Italian politician. He served as the President of the Province of Cuneo in the Piedmont region from 1985 until 1988 and the Mayor of Cuneo from 1976 to 1985.

== Biography ==
Bonino was born in Savigliano, Italy, on 11 May 1931. He was the administrative director of Santa Croce Hospital from 1968 to 1973, Carle Hospital from 1973 to 1977, as well as the director of the Cassa di Risparmio in Cuneo from 1970 to 1975.

A member of the Christian Democrats (DC), Bonino served as the Mayor of Cuneo from 1976 to 1980. He was elected to the Cuneo Provincial Council several times. Bonino served as the President of the Province of Cuneo from 1985 to 1988 and a member of the Cuneo Provincial Council from 1990 to 1993.

Bonino served in the Regional Council of Piedmont from 1988 to 1990 and again from 1993 to 1995, specializing in healthcare. He later served as a Cuneo municipal councilor from 1998 until 2000. After leaving politics, Bonino headed several medical and oncology research centers during the 2000s and 2010s.

Bonino died at a retirement home in Borgo San Dalmazzo on 27 May 2022, at the age of 91.
