= Luca Robaldo =

President of the Province of Cuneo
- Incumbent
- Assumed office 26 September 2022
- Preceded by: Federico Borgna

Mayor of Mondovì
- Incumbent
- Assumed office 14 June 2022
- Preceded by: Paolo Adriano

Personal details
- Born: 23 August 1985 (age 40) Ceva, Piedmont, Italy

Luca Robaldo (born 23 August 1985) is an Italian politician serving as president of the Province of Cuneo since 2022.

== Life and career ==
Born in Ceva, he was the son of Secondo "Dino" Robaldo, mayor of Montezemolo. Robaldo worked as a parliamentary assistant between 2010 and 2019 and later served as head of communications for the president of Piedmont from 2020 to 2022.

In July 2017, he was appointed municipal assessor in Mondovì by mayor Paolo Adriano.

Robaldo was elected mayor of Mondovì in June 2022. A few months later, on 26 September 2022, he was elected president of the Province of Cuneo, defeating Roberto Dalmazzo.

In 2025, Robaldo launched the "Patto Civico per la Granda", a province-wide civic political movement bringing together local administrators and mayors to promote non-partisan, locally focused governance.
