= List of mayors of Cuneo =

Mayor of Cuneo
- Sindaco di Cuneo

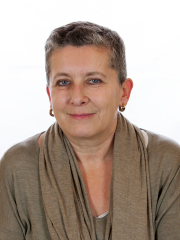
- Incumbent; Patrizia Manassero (PD) since 4 July 2022
- Appointer: Popular election
- Term length: 5 years, renewable once
- Website: Official website

The mayor of Cuneo is an elected politician who, along with the Cuneo City Council, is accountable for the strategic government of Cuneo in Piedmont, Italy.

The current mayor is Patrizia Manassero (PD), who took office on 4 July 2022.

== Overview ==
According to the Italian Constitution, the mayor of Cuneo is member of the City Council.

The mayor is elected by the population of Cuneo, who also elects the members of the City Council, controlling the mayor's policy guidelines and is able to enforce his resignation by a motion of no confidence. The mayor is entitled to appoint and release the members of his government.

Since 1993 the mayor is elected directly by Cuneo's electorate: in all mayoral elections in Italy in cities with a population higher than 15,000 the voters express a direct choice for the mayor or an indirect choice voting for the party of the candidate's coalition. If no candidate receives at least 50% of votes, the top two candidates go to a second round after two weeks. The election of the City Council is based on a direct choice for the candidate with a preference vote: the candidate with the majority of the preferences is elected. The number of the seats for each party is determined proportionally.

== Italian Republic (since 1946) ==
=== City Council election (1946-1995) ===
From 1946 to 1995, the Mayor of Cuneo was elected by the City Council.

	Mayor	Term start	Term end	Party
1	Antonio Toselli	1946	1948	DC
2	Luigi Teresio Cavallo	1948	1951	DC
3	Mario Del Pozzo	1951	1965	DC
4	Tancredi Dotta Rosso	1965	1976	DC
5	Guido Bonino	1976	1985	DC
6	Elvio Viano	1985	1990	DC
7	Giuseppe Menardi	1990	1995	DC

=== Direct election (since 1995) ===
Since 1995, under provisions of new local administration law, the Mayor of Cuneo is chosen by direct election, originally every four, then every five years.

	Mayor	Term start	Term end	Party	Coalition	Election
8	Elio Rostagno (b. 1947)	8 May 1995	3 December 1997 (Note: Reisgned after losing the majority in the City Council.)	Ind	PDS • LN	1995
Special Prefectural Commissioner tenure (3 December 1997 – 8 June 1998)
(8)	Elio Rostagno (b. 1947)	8 June 1998	12 June 2002	Ind	The Olive Tree (DS-PPI-SDI)	1998
9	Alberto Valmaggia (b. 1959)	12 June 2002	29 May 2007	DL; PD	The Olive Tree (DS-DL)	2002
9	Alberto Valmaggia (b. 1959)	29 May 2007	23 May 2012	DL; PD	The Olive Tree (DS-DL-PRC)	2007
10	Federico Borgna (b. 1973)	23 May 2012	13 June 2017	Ind	UDC	2012
10	Federico Borgna (b. 1973)	13 June 2017	4 July 2022	Ind	PD • MOD • DemoS	2017
11	Patrizia Manassero (b. 1960)	4 July 2022	Incumbent	PD	PD • A • RI • DemoS	2022
