= Save Italy =

Italian economic recovery plan

Save Italy was the name of the economic recovery plan proposed by then- Italian Prime Minister Mario Monti. The Italian economy was suffering due to the Euro area crisis. The package of fiscal adjustments was worth €30 billion ($40 billion) over three years it included, tax increases, pension cuts, stronger protection against tax evasion, and an increase in the retirement age. The goal of the reform package was to reduce Italy's debt, balance the budget and increase investor confidence.

The first set of reforms was passed by Parliament in December 2011. The second set was passed in December 2012 with a vote of 309 to 55. Following the passage, Monti resigned from his position as Prime Minister.

== Background ==
Under the administration of Prime Minister Silvio Berlusconi Italy had become involved in the Euro area crisis. Monti, a technocrat, was appointed to replace Berlusconi as Prime Minister, he proposed a new economic plan which called for fiscal adjustments of €30 billion ($40 billion) over a three-year period. It included tax increases, cuts to pension programs, stronger protection against tax evasion, and an increase in the retirement age. Monti hoped that the plan would reduce Italy's debt, balance the budget and increase investor confidence. Additionally, part of the reforms included decrease in the salary for the Prime Minister. Monti claimed the plan was necessary to prevent the Italian economy from becoming like Greece, who was also suffering from the crisis.

== Passage ==
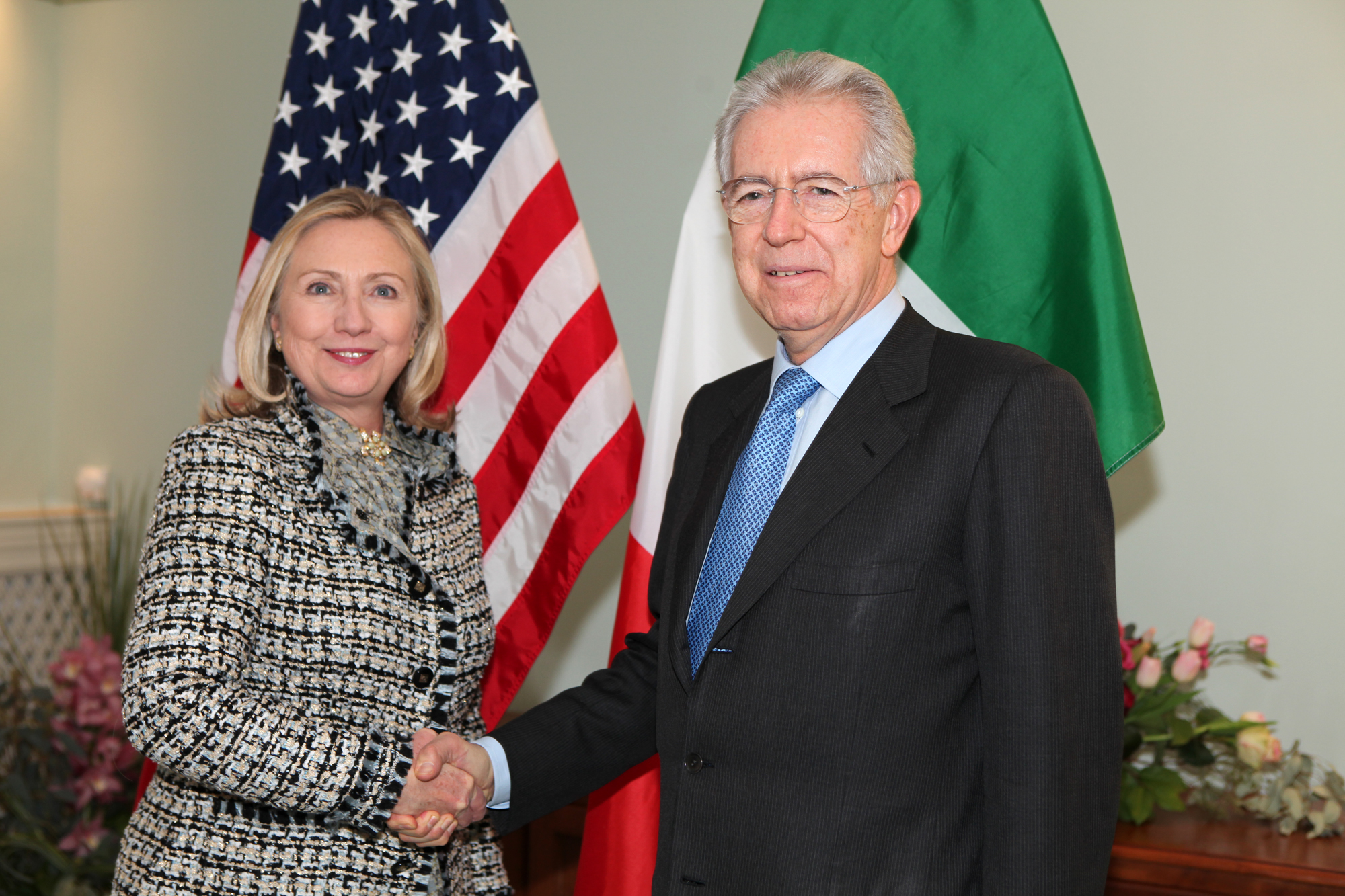
Monti with then-United States Secretary of State Hillary Clinton, 2012.

On 16 December 2011, the Lower House of the Italian Parliament adopted the measures by a vote of 495 to 88. Six days later the Upper House approved it by a vote of 257 to 41.

On 12 December 2012, the plan was passed by the Italian Parliament with 309 MPs voting in favour and 55 voting against. Following the passage of the second bill Monti resigned from his role as Prime Minister.
