= Mark Stradiotto =

Canadian chemist

Mark Stradiotto is a Canadian chemist. He is currently the Arthur B. McDonald Research Chair (CRC Tier-I equivalent) and the Alexander McLeod Professor of Chemistry in the Department of Chemistry at Dalhousie University.

== Education and academic career ==
Stradiotto received his BSc (Hons.) in applied chemistry (1995) and PhD in organometallic chemistry (1999) from McMaster University, the latter under the supervision of Michael A. Brook and Michael J. McGlinchey. After conducting research as an NSERC Postdoctoral Fellow at the University of California at Berkeley with T. Don Tilley (1999–2001), Stradiotto moved to the Department of Chemistry at Dalhousie University where he now holds the rank of Professor with tenure. In July 2013, Stradiotto was named the Alexander McLeod Professor of Chemistry, and in 2020 he was named an Arthur B. McDonald Research Chair (CRC Tier-I equivalent; 2020–2027). In 2023 he received the Governor General of Canada Award for Innovation, and in 2024 was named a Fellow of the Royal Society of Canada.

== Research contributions ==
Stradiotto's research is directed toward developing new classes of ancillary ligands/transition metal complexes that exhibit interesting and unusual reactivity patterns, with the goal of incorporating such reactivity into synthetically useful catalytic substrate transformations that can be employed by end-users in both academic and industrial settings. In particular, he is best known for developing the "DalPhos" (DALhousie PHOSphine) ligand family and derived catalyst systems for palladium and nickel cross-couplings that are of relevance to the pharmaceutical industry, many of which have been commercialized. Reported DalPhos ligands and their substrate applications include:

- Ni/CgPhen-DalPhos (tertiary alcohols)
- Ni/PhPAd-DalPhos (sulfonamides, bulky primary alkylamines)
- Ni/Phen-DalPhos (heteroaryl amines, ammonia, indole)
- Ni/PAd2-DalPhos (heteroaryl amines, fluoroalkylamines)
- Ni/NHP-DalPhos (primary alkylamines)
- Ni/CyPAd-DalPhos (primary and secondary aliphatic alcohols, cyclopropylamine and variants)
- Ni/PAd-DalPhos (ammonia and primary alkylamines)
- Pd/Mor-DalPhos (ammonia)

== Major publications ==
- "The development of cage phosphine 'DalPhos' ligands to enable nickel-catalyzed cross-couplings of (hetero)aryl electrophiles" K. M. Morrison and Mark Stradiotto* (Chem. Sci. 2024, 15, 7394-7407).
- "Ligand Design in Metal Chemistry: Reactivity and Catalysis." Edited by Mark Stradiotto and Rylan J. Lundgren Wiley, 2016. ISBN 9781118839836 - Review.
- "Challenging Nickel-Catalyzed Amine Arylations Enabled by Tailored Ancillary Ligand Design" C. M. Lavoie, P. M. MacQueen, N. L. Rotta-Loria, R. S. Sawatzky, A. Borzenko, A. J. Chisholm, B. K. V. Hargreaves, R. McDonald, M. J. Ferguson and Mark Stradiotto* (Nature Comm. 2016, 7:11073 doi: 10.1038/ncomms11073).
- "A P,N-Ligand for Pd-Catalyzed Ammonia Arylation: Coupling of Deactivated Aryl Chlorides, Chemoselective Arylations, and Room Temperature Reactions." R. J. Lundgren, B. D. Peters, P. G. Alsabeh, and Mark Stradiotto* (Angew. Chem. Int. Ed., 2010, 49, 4071-4074).
- "Rhodium- and Iridium-Catalyzed Hydroamination of Alkenes." K. D. Hesp and Mark Stradiotto* (ChemCatChem, 2010, 2, 1192-1207).
- "Addressing Challenges in Palladium-Catalyzed Cross-Coupling Reactions Through Ligand Design." R. J. Lundgren and Mark Stradiotto* (Chem. Eur. J., 2012, 18, 9758-9769).
- "A Highly Versatile Catalyst System for the Cross-Coupling of Aryl Chlorides and Amines." R. J. Lundgren, A. Sappong-Kumankumah, and Mark Stradiotto*. (Chem. Eur. J., 2010, 16, 1983-1991).
- "Stereo- and Regioselective Gold-Catalyzed Hydroamination of Internal Alkynes with Dialkylamines." K. D. Hesp and Mark Stradiotto* (J. Am. Chem. Soc., 2010, 132, 18026-18029).

== Other interests ==
Stradiotto is a drummer who performs and records frequently with Adrian Raso, including most recently pre-production recording for a 2025 collaboration with Fanfare Ciocărlia entitled "The Devil Rides Again".
