= Francesco Pionati =

Italian politician

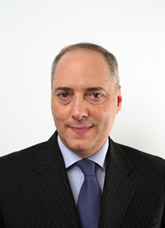

Member of the Chamber of Deputies
- In office 29 April 2008 – 14 March 2013

Member of the Senate
- In office 28 April 2006 – 28 April 2008

Personal details
- Born: 15 July 1958 (age 67) Avellino, Italy
- Party: UDC (2006–2008); AdC (2008–currently); NcI (2022-currently)
- Profession: Politician, journalist

Francesco Pionati (born 15 July 1958 in Avellino), is an Italian politician and journalist.

Son of Giovanni Pionati, former mayor of Avellino, he went into the RAI television on direct reporting by Ciriaco De Mita and he started working on TG1. In 1987 he worked as parliamentary journalist and in the 2000s, under the direction of Clemente Mimun, He became vice-director of TG1.

Pionati also worked for several newspapers, he has been part of the Film Commission's Ministerial Commission and in 2004 was appointed to the board of directors of Cinecittà Holding. However, Pionati resigned from this office for criticisms about his appointment.

In the 2006 Italian general election he was candidate for the Senate with the Union of Christian and Centre Democrats, taking over the outgoing Salvatore Cuffaro. In the same year he was appointed National Communications Officer of UDC, while in 2007 he was appointed National spokesman of the party. In the 2008 Italian general election he was elected to the Chamber of Deputies, but on 28 November 2008, in disagreement with the departure of Casini from the centre-right, he left the UDC and founded a new party, Alliance of the Centre, that entered in the majority of the government led by Silvio Berlusconi.

He was candidate in the 2013 regional election in Lazio into the Storace List, but he wasn't elected.
