= We the South =

We the South Noi Sud
- Secretary: Antonio Milo
- President: Vincenzo Scotti
- Founded: 21 January 2010
- Split from: Movement for the Autonomies
- Headquarters: Via Crescenzio, 91; 00193 Rome
- Ideology: Autonomism; Regionalism; Conservatism
- Political position: Centre-right
- Chamber of Deputies: 0 / 400
- Senate: 0 / 200
- European Parliament: 0 / 76

Website
- http://www.noisud.it/

We the South (Italian: Noi Sud, NS), whose complete name is Freedom and Autonomy - We the South (Italian: Libertà e Autonomia - Noi Sud), is a regionalist political party in Italy based in the Campania but seeking to represent the whole South.

== History ==
The party emerged in January 2010 as a split from the Movement for the Autonomies (MpA). MpA, a Sicilian-based regionalist party active all around Southern Italy, had been in coalition, both at national and regional level, with The People of Freedom (PdL), the centre-right party led by Silvio Berlusconi since 2006, but had become critical of him. In December 2009 Raffaele Lombardo, leader of MpA and President of Sicily, had formed his third cabinet including ministers from his MpA party, the PdL–Sicily and the newly formed regional section of Alliance for Italy, plus some independents, including one who was close to the opposition Democratic Party (PD). No members of the "official" PdL were included.

The break-up of the alliance with the official PdL in Sicily and all around the South led to a painful split within the MpA. In January 2010 Vincenzo Scotti and four deputies out of eight (Arturo Iannaccone, Elio Belcastro, Antonio Milo and Luciano Sardelli), who wanted to continue the alliance with the PdL, were expelled from the party and formed their own movement.

In the 2010 regional elections the party gained 3.6% of the vote in Campania (electing two regional councilors) and 3.1% in Calabria.

In October 2010 NS formed a joint group, led by Luciano Sardelli (NS), in the Chamber of Deputies with The Populars of Italy Tomorrow (PID). In the event Americo Porfidia, a former member of Italy of Values (IdV), joined NS. Another former IdV deputy, Antonio Razzi, joined NS in December. In January 2011 NS took part to Responsible Initiative (IR), a centre-right group in the Chamber, but one deputy, Antonio Gaglione, refused to join it.

The party was soon divided in two wings, one led by Iannaccone and another one led by Scotti. In May 2011 Scotti tried to sack Iannaccone as secretary of the party and was sacked as president by Iannaccone instead. In July Iannaccone led NS to jointly launch with Force of the South and I the South the Federation of the South, later Great South. In November 2011 Iannaccone, Belcastro and Porfidia left PT to join forces with Force of the South in the Mixed Group, while still being loyal to Berlusconi. The other faction, including Scotti, Milo and Sardelli, was more critical toward Berlusconi. In October 2012 the faction of the party led by Iannaccone changed its name into Autonomy South (Autonomia Sud, AS), while the faction led by Milo maintained the component called "Us the South" within the People and Territory group.

In the 2013 general election the party didn't present its list, however Milo was elected to the Senate with The People of Freedom and later joined the Great Autonomies and Freedom group, while retaining his loyalty to the PdL, which was transformed into Forza Italia in late 2013.

In May 2015 Milo left Great Autonomies and Freedom to join the new group of the Conservatives and Reformists and subsequently, in July 2015, the Liberal Popular Alliance.

In the 2015 regional elections the party gained 2.1% of the vote in Campania, without any elected in the Regional Council.

Ahead of the 2025 regional elections in Campania, We the South is forming a single list with Clemente Mastella’s Us of the Centre in support of the centre-left candidate Roberto Fico.

== Election results ==
=== Regional elections ===
Election	Votes	%	Seats	+/–
2010	98,895	3.59	2 / 60	New
2015	47,367	2.09	0 / 51	▼2
2025	71,260 (Note: In a joint list with Us of the Centre.)	3.55	0 / 51	Steady
