= Francesca Martini =

Italian politician

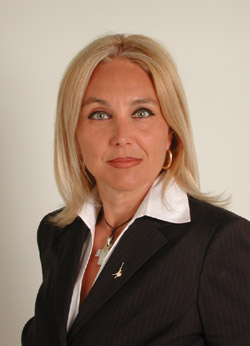
Francesca Martini

Francesca Martini (born 31 August 1961 in Verona) is a Venetist politician. She is a member of Liga Veneta-Lega Nord.

She was first elected to the Chamber of Deputies in 2001, but she failed re-election five years later. In 2007, however, she replaced Flavio Tosi as Health regional minister of Veneto in Galan III Government.

In May 2008, after returning to the Chamber of Deputies, Martini was appointed Under-Secretary of Labour and Health in Berlusconi IV Cabinet.
