= Alberto Giorgetti =

Italian politician (born 1967)

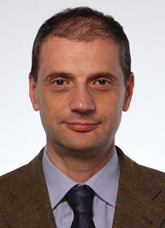
Alberto Giorgetti

Alberto Giorgetti (born 8 September 1967 in Verona) is an Italian politician.

A former member of the Italian Social Movement, he joined National Alliance in 1995. Four times elected to the Chamber of Deputies (1996, 2001, 2006 and 2008), he has been regional leader of the National Alliance since 2001. He has been Under-Secretary of Economy and Finances in Berlusconi IV Cabinet since May 2008.

He is the younger brother of Massimo Giorgetti who is regional minister since 1995.

His run at the Chamber of Deputies ended in 2018.
