= Autonomy South =

Italian political party

Autonomy South Autonomia Sud
- Secretary: Arturo Iannaccone
- President: Americo Porfidia
- Founded: 6 October 2012
- Split from: We the South
- Headquarters: via Fratelli del Gaudio, 13 – Avellino
- Ideology: Regionalism
- Chamber of Deputies: 0 / 400
- Senate: 0 / 200
- European Parliament: 0 / 76

Autonomy South (Italian: Autonomia Sud, AS), whose complete name is Autonomy South – We for the South (Italian: Autonomia Sud – Noi per il Sud), is a regionalist political party in Italy based in the Southern Italy.

== History ==
The party was born in October 2012 by a split of We the South, after a court sentence that banned to the faction of Iannaccone, Belcastro and Porfidia to still use the name "We the South".

In 2013 Autonomy South signed a federative pact with Reality Italy, a southern party which usually sides with the centre-left Democratic Party.
