= Fourth Berlusconi government =

60th government of the Italian Republic

- 60th Cabinet of Italy

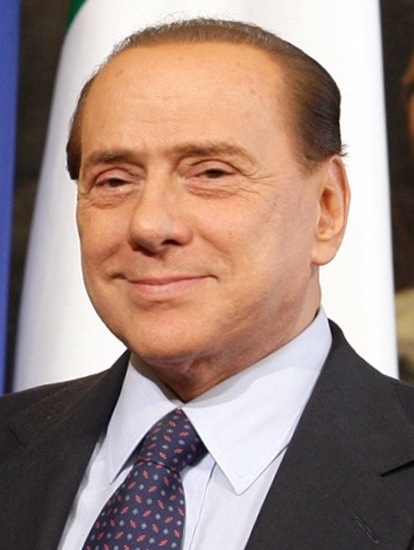
- Date formed: 8 May 2008
- Date dissolved: 16 November 2011 (1,288 days)

People and organisations
- Head of state: Giorgio Napolitano
- Head of government: Silvio Berlusconi
- No. of ministers: 25 (incl. Prime Minister)
- Ministers removed: 5 resigned
- Total no. of members: 30 (incl. Prime Minister)
- Member parties: PdL, LN, PT (since March 2011)
- Status in legislature: Majority (coalition)
- Opposition parties: PD, IdV, UdC, FLI (since Nov. 2010), MpA (since Nov. 2010)

History
- Incoming formation: Berlusconi IV Cabinet formation, 2008
- Election: 2008 election
- Legislature term: XVI Legislature (2008–2013)
- Predecessor: Second Prodi government
- Successor: Monti government

The fourth Berlusconi government was the 60th government of Italy, in office from 8 May 2008 to 16 November 2011. It was the fourth government led by Silvio Berlusconi, who then became the longest-serving Prime Minister of Italy of the Italian Republic (3340 days in office). The government was supported by a coalition between The People of Freedom (PdL) and the Northern League (LN), together with other smaller centre-right parties.

At its formation, the government included 22 ministers and 39 under-secretaries, for a total of 61 members. At the end of its term the cabinet was composed of 24 ministers, 4 deputy ministers and 39 under-secretaries, for a total of 67 members. With 1287 days of tenure, it was third in longevity in the history of the Italian Republic.

== Formation ==
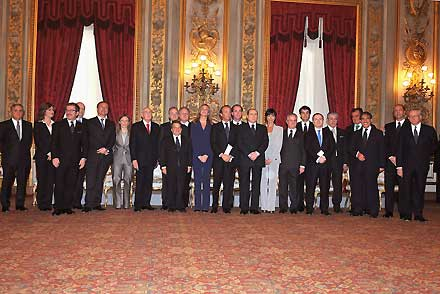
Berlusconi's government during the oath.

After the sudden fall of the second Prodi government on 24 January, the break-up of The Union coalition and the subsequent political crisis (which paved the way for a fresh general election in April 2008), Berlusconi, Gianfranco Fini and other party leaders finally agreed on 8 February 2008 to form a joint list named "The People of Freedom" (Italian: Il Popolo della Libertà), allied with the Northern League of Umberto Bossi and with the Sicilian Movement for Autonomy of Raffaele Lombardo.

In the snap parliamentary elections held on 13/14 April 2008 this coalition won against Walter Veltroni's centre-left coalition in both houses of the Italian Parliament.

Berlusconi and his ministers were sworn in on 8 May 2008.

== Fall ==
On 10 October the Chamber of Deputies rejected the law on the budget of the State proposed by the government. As a result of this event Berlusconi moved for a confidence vote in the Chamber on 14 October, he won the vote with just 316 votes to 301, minimum required to retain a majority. An increasing number of Deputies continued to cross the floor and join the opposition and on 8 November the Chamber approved the law on the budget of the State previously rejected but with only 308 votes and 1 abstention, while opposition parties didn't participate in the vote to highlight that Berlusconi lost his majority. Among other things, his perceived failure to tackle Italy's debt crisis with an estimated debt sum of €1.9 trillion ($2.6 trillion) urged Berlusconi to leave office. The popularity of this decision was reflected in the fact that while he was resigning crowds sang the hallelujah portion of George Frederick Handel's "Messiah", complete with some vocal accompaniment; there was also dancing in the streets outside the Quirinal Palace, the official residence of the President of Italy, where Berlusconi went to tender his resignation.

The austerity package was passed, it will raise €59.8 billion in savings from spending cuts and tax raises, including freezing public-sector salaries until 2014 and gradually increasing the retirement age for women in the private sector from 60 in 2014 to 65 in 2026. The resignation also came at a difficult time for Berlusconi, as he was involved in numerous trials for corruption, fraud and sex offences. He was often found guilty in lower courts but used loopholes in Italy's legal system to evade incarceration.

Berlusconi had also failed to meet some of his pre-election promises and had failed to prevent economic decline and introduce serious reforms. Many believed that the problems and doubts over Berlusconi's leadership and his coalition were one of the factors that contributed to market anxieties over an imminent Italian financial disaster, which could have a potentially catastrophic effect on the 17-nation eurozone and the world economy. Many critics of Berlusconi accused him of using his power primarily to protect his own business ventures. Umberto Bossi, leader of the Northern League, a partner in Berlusconi's right-wing coalition, was quoted as informing reporters outside parliament, "We asked the prime minister to step aside."

CNN reported on 7 November that Berlusconi had previously denied the rumors that he was going to resign and had stated on his Facebook page that "The rumors of my resignation are groundless." On 12 November 2011, after a final meeting with his cabinet, Berlusconi met Italian president Giorgio Napolitano at the Quirinal Palace to tender his resignation. He announced this to the Italian public by telephone on one of his television channels. Italian news agency ANSA reported that Berlusconi had remarked to his aides that "This is something that deeply saddens me". Berlusconi conceded that he had lost his parliamentary majority and concluded that "things like who leads or who doesn't lead the government was less important than doing what is right for the country." Berlusconi issued a statement that he would not stand for office in Italy again after the budget defeat. In his resignation he was said to have also mentioned "eight traitors", former allies who had abstained.

== Investiture votes ==
14-15 May 2008 Investiture votes for Berlusconi IV Cabinet
House of Parliament	Vote	Parties	Votes
Chamber of Deputies	Yes	PdL, LN, MpA	335 / 611
Chamber of Deputies	No	PD, UdC, IdV, SVP–ALD, Others	275 / 611
Chamber of Deputies	Abstention	Others	1 / 611
Senate of the Republic	Yes	PdL, LN, MpA	173 / 322
Senate of the Republic	No	PD, IdV, UdC–SVP–AUT, Others	137 / 312
Senate of the Republic	Abstention	Others	2 / 312

== Party breakdown ==
=== Beginning of term ===
==== Ministers ====
- Forza Italia
12
- National Alliance
4
- Northern League
4
- Christian Democracy for Autonomies
1

==== Ministers and other members ====
- The People of Freedom (PdL): Prime minister, 17 ministers, 30 undersecretaries
  - Forza Italia (FI): Prime minister, 12 ministers, 17 undersecretaries
  - National Alliance (AN): 4 ministers, 8 undersecretaries
  - Christian Democracy for Autonomies (DCA): 1 minister
  - Liberal Populars (PL): 1 undersecretary
  - Independents: 4 undersecretaries
- Northern League (LN): 4 ministers, 5 undersecretaries
- Movement for Autonomy (MpA): 2 undersecretaries
- Christian Democracy (DC): 1 undersecretary
- Independents: 1 undersecretary

=== End of term ===
==== Ministers ====
- The People of Freedom
19
- Northern League
3
- People and Territory
1
- Independents
1

==== Ministers and other members ====
- The People of Freedom (PdL): Prime minister, 18 ministers, 24 undersecretaries
- Northern League (LN): 3 ministers, 1 deputy minister, 4 undersecretaries
- People and Territory (PT): 1 minister, 1 deputy minister, 2 undersecretaries
  - The Populars of Italy Tomorrow (PID): 1 minister
  - Popular Action (AP): 1 deputy minister
  - Movement of National Responsibility (MRN): 1 undersecretary
  - La Discussione: 1 undersecretary
- Independents: 1 minister, 2 undersecretaries
- Republicans-Actionists (RA): 1 deputy minister
- Great South (GS): 2 undersecretaries
- Christian Democracy (DC): 1 undersecretary
- The Right (Destra): 1 undersecretary
- National Cohesion (CN): 1 undersecretary

== Council of Ministers ==
Office	Name	Party	Term
Prime Minister	Silvio Berlusconi	PdL	2008–2011
Minister of Foreign Affairs	Franco Frattini	PdL	2008–2011
Minister of the Interior	Roberto Maroni	LN	2008–2011
Minister of Justice	Angelino Alfano	PdL	2008–2011
Minister of Justice	Nitto Francesco Palma	PdL	2011
Minister of Defence	Ignazio La Russa	PdL	2008–2011
Minister of Economy and Finance	Giulio Tremonti	PdL	2008–2011
Minister of Economic Development	Claudio Scajola	PdL	2008–2010
Minister of Economic Development	Silvio Berlusconi (ad interim)	PdL	2010
Minister of Economic Development	Paolo Romani	PdL	2010–2011
Minister of Agricultural, Food and Forestry Policies	Luca Zaia	LN	2008–2010
Minister of Agricultural, Food and Forestry Policies	Giancarlo Galan	PdL	2010–2011
Minister of Agricultural, Food and Forestry Policies	Francesco Saverio Romano	PT	2011
Minister of the Environment	Stefania Prestigiacomo	PdL	2008–2011
Minister of Infrastructure and Transport	Altero Matteoli	PdL	2008–2011
Minister of Labour and Social Policies	Maurizio Sacconi	PdL	2008–2011
Minister of Health	Ferruccio Fazio	Independent	2009–2011
Minister of Education, University and Research	Mariastella Gelmini	PdL	2008–2011
Minister of Cultural Heritage and Activities	Sandro Bondi	PdL	2008–2011
Minister of Cultural Heritage and Activities	Giancarlo Galan	PdL	2011
Minister of Regional Affairs and Territorial Cohesion	Raffaele Fitto	PdL	2008–2011
Minister for the Implementation of the Government Program	Gianfranco Rotondi	PdL	2008–2011
Minister of Public Administration	Renato Brunetta	PdL	2008–2011
Minister for Equal Opportunities	Mara Carfagna	PdL	2008–2011
Minister of European Affairs	Andrea Ronchi	PdL / FLI	2008–2011
Minister of European Affairs	Anna Maria Bernini	PdL	2010–2011
Minister for Parliamentary Relations	Elio Vito	PdL	2008–2011
Minister for Federal Reforms	Umberto Bossi	LN	2008–2011
Minister of Youth Policies	Giorgia Meloni	PdL	2008–2011
Minister for Legislative Simplification	Roberto Calderoli	LN	2008–2011
Minister for Subsidiarity and Decentralization	Aldo Brancher	PdL	2010
Minister of Tourism	Michela Vittoria Brambilla	PdL	2009–2011
Secretary of the Council of Ministers	Gianni Letta	PdL	2008–2011

== Composition ==
Office	Portrait	Name	Term of office	Party
Prime Minister		Silvio Berlusconi	8 May 2008 – 16 November 2011	The People of Freedom
Prime Minister	Undersecretaries: Gianni Letta (PdL) – Delegated to the Authority for the Security of the Republic; Paolo Bonaiuti (PdL) – Delegated to Information, Communications and Publishing; Carlo Giovanardi (PdL) – Delegated to Family Policies, the Fight Against Drugs, and the Civil Service; Gianfranco Micciché (GS) (Note: before 30 October 2010: PdL) – Delegated to the Inter-ministerial Committee for Economic Planning; Rocco Crimi (PdL) – Delegated to Sport; Michela Vittoria Brambilla (PdL) – Delegated to Tourism (until 8 May 2009); Guido Bertolaso (Ind.) – Delegated to the Solution of the Waste Management Crisis in Campania and to the Coordination of Civil Protection to a European and International Level (until 11 November 2010)			
Minister of Foreign Affairs		Franco Frattini	8 May 2008 – 16 November 2011	The People of Freedom
Minister of Foreign Affairs	Undersecretaries: Stefania Craxi (PdL); Alfredo Mantica (PdL); Vincenzo Scotti (NS) (Note: before 22 January 2010: MpA) (until 7 November 2011)			
Minister of the Interior		Roberto Maroni	8 May 2008 – 16 November 2011	Northern League
Minister of the Interior	Undersecretaries: Alfredo Mantovano (PdL); Michelino Davico (LN); Nitto Francesco Palma (PdL) (until 27 July 2011); Sonia Viale (LN) (since 5 May 2011); Guido Viceconte (PdL) (since 14 October 2011)			
Minister of Justice		Angelino Alfano	8 May 2008 – 27 July 2011	The People of Freedom
Minister of Justice		Nitto Francesco Palma	27 July 2011 – 16 November 2011	The People of Freedom
Minister of Justice	Undersecretaries: Elisabetta Casellati (PdL); Giacomo Caliendo (PdL)			
Minister of Defence		Ignazio La Russa	8 May 2008 – 16 November 2011	The People of Freedom
Minister of Defence	Undersecretaries: Guido Crosetto (PdL); Giuseppe Cossiga (PdL)			
Minister of Economy and Finance		Giulio Tremonti	8 May 2008 – 16 November 2011	The People of Freedom
Minister of Economy and Finance	Deputy Minister: Giuseppe Vegas (PdL) (29 Mary 2009 – 15 December 2010); Undersecretaries: Luigi Casero (PdL); Alberto Giorgetti (PdL); Giuseppe Vegas (PdL) (until 21 May 2009); Daniele Molgora (LN) (until 20 May 2010); Nicola Cosentino (PdL) (until 15 July 2010); Sonia Viale (LN) (20 May 2010 – 5 May 2011); Bruno Cesario (PT) (since 5 May 2011); Antonio Gentile (PdL) (since 5 May 2011)			
Minister of Economic Development		Claudio Scajola	8 May 2008 – 5 May 2010	The People of Freedom
Minister of Economic Development		Silvio Berlusconi (Acting)	5 May 2010 – 4 October 2010	The People of Freedom
Minister of Economic Development		Paolo Romani	4 October 2010 – 16 November 2011	The People of Freedom
Minister of Economic Development	Deputy Ministers: Adolfo Urso (FLI) (Note: before 30 July 2010: PdL) (30 June 2009 – 17 November 2010); Paolo Romani (PdL) (30 June 2009 – 4 October 2010; Catia Polidori (PT) (14 October 2011 – 16 November 2011); Undersecretaries: Ugo Martinat (PdL) (until 28 March 2009); Paolo Romani (PdL) (until 30 June 2009); Catia Polidori (until 14 October 2011); Adolfo Urso (PdL) (8 May 2008 – 30 June 2009); Stefano Saglia (PdL) (since 30 April 2009); Daniela Melchiorre (LD) (5 May 2011 – 27 May 2011)			
Minister of Agricultural, Food and Forestry Policies		Luca Zaia	8 May 2008 – 16 April 2010	Northern League
Minister of Agricultural, Food and Forestry Policies		Giancarlo Galan	16 April 2010 – 23 March 2011	The People of Freedom
Minister of Agricultural, Food and Forestry Policies		Francesco Saverio Romano	23 March 2011 – 16 November 2011	People and Territory
Minister of Agricultural, Food and Forestry Policies	Undersecretaries: Antonio Buonfiglio (FLI) (until 17 November 2010); Roberto Rosso (PdL) (since 5 May 2011)			
Minister of the Environment		Stefania Prestigiacomo	8 May 2008 – 16 November 2011	The People of Freedom
Minister of the Environment	Undersecretaries: Roberto Menia (FLI) (until 17 November 2010); Giampiero Catone (PT) (since 5 May 2011); Elio Vittorio Belcastro (GS) (Note: before 7 November 2011: PT) (since 28 July 2011)			
Minister of Infrastructure and Transport		Altero Matteoli	8 May 2008 – 16 November 2011	The People of Freedom
Minister of Infrastructure and Transport	Deputy Ministers: Roberto Castelli (LN) (21 May 2009 – 16 November 2011); Aurelio Misiti (RA) (14 Oct 2011 – 16 November 2011); Undersecretaries: Bartolomeo Giachino (Ind.); Mario Mantovani (PdL); Giuseppe Maria Reina (MpA) (until 17 November 2010)			
Minister of Labour and Social Policies		Maurizio Sacconi	8 May 2008 – 16 November 2011	The People of Freedom
Minister of Labour and Social Policies	Deputy Minister: Ferruccio Fazio (Ind.) (21 May 2009 – 14 December 2009); Undersecretaries: Francesca Martini (LN) (until 4 February 2010); Eugenia Roccella (PdL) (until 4 February 2010); Pasquale Viespoli (FLI) (until 8 October 2010); Nello Musumeci (LD) (since 15 April 2011); Luca Bellotti (PdL) (since 5 May 2011)			
Minister of Education, University and Research		Mariastella Gelmini	8 May 2008 – 16 November 2011	The People of Freedom
Minister of Education, University and Research	Undersecretaries: Giuseppe Pizza (DC); Guido Viceconte (PdL) (5 May 2011 – 14 October 2011); Giuseppe Galati (PdL) (since 14 October 2011)			
Minister of Cultural Heritage and Activities		Sandro Bondi	8 May 2008 – 23 March 2011	The People of Freedom
Minister of Cultural Heritage and Activities		Giancarlo Galan	23 March 2011 – 16 November 2011	The People of Freedom
Minister of Cultural Heritage and Activities	Undersecretaries: Francesco Giro (PdL); Riccardo Villari (CN) (since 5 May 2011)			
Minister of Health		Ferruccio Fazio	13 December 2009 – 16 November 2011	Independent
Minister of Health	Undersecretaries: Francesca Martini (LN) (since 4 February 2010); Eugenia Roccella (PdL) (since 4 February 2010)			
Minister for Parliamentary Relations (without portfolio)		Elio Vito	8 May 2008 – 16 November 2011	The People of Freedom
Minister for Parliamentary Relations (without portfolio)	Undersecretary: Laura Ravetto (PdL) (since 4 March 2010)			
Minister of Public Administration (without portfolio)		Renato Brunetta	8 May 2008 – 16 November 2011	The People of Freedom
Minister of Public Administration (without portfolio)	Undersecretary: Andrea Augello (PdL) (since 4 March 2010)			
Minister of Regional Affairs and Territorial Cohesion (without portfolio)		Raffaele Fitto	8 May 2008 – 16 November 2011	The People of Freedom
Minister for Equal Opportunities (without portfolio)		Mara Carfagna	8 May 2008 – 16 November 2011	The People of Freedom
Minister of European Affairs (without portfolio)		Andrea Ronchi	8 May 2008 – 15 November 2010	The People of Freedom; Before 30 July 2010
Minister of European Affairs (without portfolio)		Andrea Ronchi	8 May 2008 – 15 November 2010	Future and Freedom; After 30 July 2010
Minister of European Affairs (without portfolio)		Anna Maria Bernini	15 November 2010 – 16 November 2011	The People of Freedom
Minister of Youth (without portfolio)		Giorgia Meloni	8 May 2008 – 16 November 2011	The People of Freedom
Minister for the Implementation of the Government Program (without portfolio)		Gianfranco Rotondi	8 May 2008 – 16 November 2011	The People of Freedom
Minister for the Implementation of the Government Program (without portfolio)	Undersecretary: Daniela Santanchè (PdL) (since 4 March 2010)			
Minister for Federal Reforms (without portfolio)		Umberto Bossi	8 May 2008 – 16 November 2011	Northern League
Minister for Federal Reforms (without portfolio)	Undersecretary: Aldo Brancher (PdL) (until 18 June 2010)			
Minister for Legislative Simplification (without portfolio)		Roberto Calderoli	8 May 2008 – 16 November 2011	Northern League
Minister for Legislative Simplification (without portfolio)	Undersecretary: Maurizio Balocchi (LN) (until 14 February 2010); Francesco Belsito (LN) (since 22 February 2010)			
Minister of Tourism (without portfolio)		Michela Vittoria Brambilla	8 May 2009 – 16 November 2011	The People of Freedom
Minister for Subsidiarity and Decentralization (without portfolio)		Aldo Brancher	18 June 2010 – 5 July 2010	The People of Freedom
Secretary of the Council of Ministers		Gianni Letta	8 May 2008 – 16 November 2011	The People of Freedom
