= Aldo Brancher =

Italian politician (born 1943)

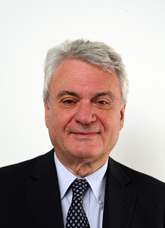

Minister for Subsidiarity and Decentralization
- In office 18 June 2010 – 5 July 2010
- Prime Minister: Silvio Berlusconi

Member of the Italian Chamber of Deputies
- In office 21 May 2001 – 14 March 2013
- Constituency: Veneto 1

Personal details
- Born: 30 May 1943 (age 83) Trichiana, Veneto, Italy
- Party: Forza Italia (2013-present)
- Other political affiliations: Christian Democracy (1960s-1994)(supporter); Forza Italia (1999-2009); The People of Freedom (2009-2013)

Aldo Brancher (born 30 May 1943; Trichiana, Veneto) is an Italian politician. He served as a minister without portfolio in the Government of Silvio Berlusconi for 17 days in June/July 2010 but was forced to resign due to a pending court case.

== Early career ==
Before his political career, Brancher was a Pauline priest. He was a key figure in the publication of the Paulines' magazine, Famiglia Cristiana. After leaving the priesthood, he worked for Berlusconi's advertising house, Publitalia '80, before moving on to Berlusconi's holding company, Fininvest.

In 1993, while working for Fininvest, Brancher was caught up in the Tangentopoli political corruption scandal. He served three months in San Vittore prison for false accounting and for illegally funding the Italian Socialist Party, but was released on a technicality following a ruling by the Court of Cassation.

== Political career ==
Brancher was elected to the 14th legislature of the Italian Chamber of Deputies in May 2001 and was re-elected in April 2006 and April 2008. He was appointed as a Secretary of State with responsibility for reform on 12 May 2008.

Brancher was named as a minister without portfolio, with specific responsibility for federalism, on 18 June 2010. A few days later, his responsibility was changed to decentralisation as the Lega Nord – partners in Berlusconi's coalition Government – was concerned that his role would conflict with that of its leader, Umberto Bossi, who was Minister for Federal Reforms. At the time of his appointment, Brancher was facing trial for alleged embezzlement during the 2005 takeover of Antonveneta. When, just a few days later, Brancher invoked an immunity law that protects ministers from prosecution, the opposition accused Berlusconi of making the appointment solely to save his friend from the court hearing. Giorgio Napolitano, the President of Italy, rejected Brancher's invocation of the right to immunity, suggesting that, as Brancher was a minister without portfolio, there was no actual Ministry work preventing him from standing trial. Following the President’s comments, the opposition, along with members of Brancher’s own party, threatened a motion of no confidence unless he resigned. Brancher acquiesced and announced his resignation during the opening day of his trial on 5 July 2010.

Assembly seats
Preceded by Title jointly held	Member of the Italian Chamber of Deputies; Legislatures; XIV, XV, XVI; 2001 - 2013	Succeeded by Title jointly held
