= Marco Stradiotto =

Italian politician

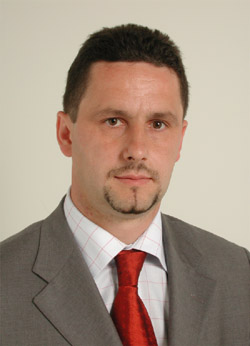
Marco Stradiotto

Marco Stradiotto (born 7 October 1965) is an Italian politician.

Stradiotto was born in Noale. He was elected to the Legislature XIV as a member of the Chamber of Deputies, serving from 2001 to 2006, while affiliated with The Daisy. Between 2008 and 2013, he sat in the Senate for the Democratic Party.
