= Massimo Calearo =

Italian entrepreneur and politician

Massimo Calearo Ciman (born 23 November 1955 in Vicenza) is an Italian entrepreneur and former politician from Veneto. Chairman of Calearo Antenne spa, the family company producing antennas. Before entering politics he held several leadership roles within Confindustria, at local and national level. Despite being a liberal-conservative, at the 2008 general election Calearo headed the list of the centre-left Democratic Party (PD) and was elected to the Italian Chamber of Deputies. However he soon found that the party was too left-wing for him and in November 2009 took part to the foundation of Alliance for Italy (ApI) with Francesco Rutelli.

After having launched Alliance for Veneto (ApV) in April 2010, in September Calearo left ApI in order to support Silvio Berlusconi's government.

== Biography ==
Born in 1955 in Vicenza, he holds a degree in Economics and Business and has three children. From a young age, he took over the company founded by his parents in 1957, expanding it and later becoming president of Calearo Antenne S.p.A., which today employs approximately 600 people.

From 1993 to 1995, he served as president of the Young Entrepreneurs of Vicenza. From 1996 to 1998, he held the position of president of Aeroporti Vicentini Spa. From May 2003 to April 2008, he served as president of General Confederation of Italian Industry Vicenza, having previously served as its vice president from 2001 to 2003. During this term, he coordinated the establishment of the Industrial Park in Samorin, Slovakia (a consortium of approximately 15 companies from Vicenza and elsewhere, operating in the mechatronics sector).

From 2003 to 2010, he served as president of Centro Servizi Vicenza in Samorin (Slovakia), a permanent center of the Industrialists’ Association dedicated to supporting businesses operating in the region. From July 13, 2004, to 2008, he served as national president of Federmeccanica, the federation of metalworking companies, of which he had alreadyx been vice president since 2001. He served as a board member of the Vicenza branch of the Bank of Italy, chairman of the local committee of UniCredit, and a member of the board of directors of Athesis in Verona, the publishing company behind Il Giornale di Vicenza, L’Arena, and Bresciaoggi.
