= Gianna Gancia =

Italian politician

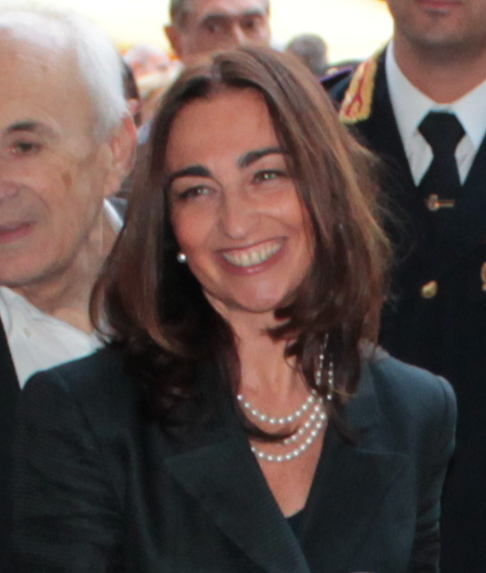

Member of the European Parliament for North-West Italy
- In office 2 July 2019 – 9 June 2024

Personal details
- Party: League

Gianna Gancia (born 31 December 1972, in Bra) is an Italian politician.

In 2009 she was elected President of the Province of Cuneo. In 2014 she was elected to the Regional Council of Piedmont, with 6,284 preference votes.

In the 2019 EP election she has been elected as a member of the European Parliament.
