= Catia Polidori =

Italian politician (born 1967)

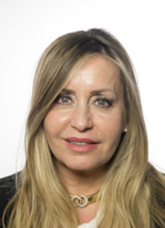
- Polidori in 2018

Member of the Chamber of Deputies
- Incumbent
- Assumed office 29 April 2008
- Constituency: Veneto 1 (2008–2013); Veneto 2 (2013–2018); Umbria – 01 (2018–present)

Personal details
- Born: 3 July 1967 (age 58)
- Party: Forza Italia

Catia Polidori (born 3 July 1967) is an Italian politician serving as a member of the Chamber of Deputies since 2008. From May to November 2011, she served as deputy minister of economic development.
