= Historical Series of the Bank of Italy =

The Historical Series of the Bank of Italy (Collana Storica della Banca d’Italia, or CSBI) is the foremost series of publications in Italian economic, monetary and financial history, launched by the Bank of Italy, the Italian central bank in 1989, and published first by Laterza until 2011, and, subsequently, by Marsilio Editori from 2012.

Copies of the 46 volumes published so far are available in Italian in over 100 libraries, in Italy and abroad. Furthermore, thanks to the digitisation and OCR optical recognition procedures undertaken by the Economic History Division of the Bank of Italy, these are now also freely readable and downloadable online on the webpages of the Bank.

== Origin ==
The original project for the Historical Series came into being in the 1980s as the brainchild of the then Bank of Italy governor Carlo Azeglio Ciampi, and was conceived in view of the impending centenary of the establishment of the Bank in 1993. The focus on historical research underlying such project had already emerged in studies undertaken both within the Bank and in the academic world on the complex phenomena that had shaped the international monetary and financial system from the 1970s onwards.

Firstly, the successes with respect to both readership and academic repute of works such as the famous Manias, Panics and Crashes – A History of Financial Crises (1978), by Charles P. Kindleberger, brought to light the recurrent nature of the processes of financial speculation and of monetary crisis that had emerged from the late 19th century. This stimulated the emergence of new strands of historical research on the monetary policy conducted in industrialised countries such as Italy, and, in turn, afforded to them great relevance.

Concurrently with these trends, the years after the end of the Bretton Woods system, which occurred in 1971–73, were marked by the opening of new debates in the economics literature - between Neo-Keynesians on the one hand, and Monetarists on the other. These debates were concerned with determining what role central banks of industrialised countries should play in the conduct of monetary policy and in the pursuit of financial stability. It is precisely in this setting that the history of financial structures manifested its usefulness, so as to better grasp the reach and potential of the tools available to monetary policy, and of the institutional arrangements underlying these.

The intertwining of economic methods of analysis with the themes of monetary, financial and banking history found fertile ground in Italy as well, beginning with the reconstructions of monetary and banking statistics for Italy in 1845-1936 by Renato De Mattia (1967). A further example of this newfound historical emphasis in the research world was the 1984 re-launching of the Rivista di Storia Economica, the main Italian research journal in economic history, by Pierluigi Ciocca e Gianni Toniolo. The Rivista had been originally founded by Luigi Einaudi in 1936.

The Office for Historical Research of the Bank of Italy was set up in 1982 during Ciampi's tenure as governor in the midst of this favourable cultural and intellectual environment. The Office had as purpose the conduct of archival and statistical research in preparation for the centenary of the establishment of the Bank of Italy, which would take place roughly a decade later. Indeed, Ciampi regarded the centenary not simply as a formal occasion that called for festive celebrations, but rather as a precious opportunity to launch ambitious new research projects on the history of the policies and protagonists that had come to define the Italian central bank over the decades.

The sheer breadth of these research initiatives eventually required the enlarging in 1990 of the team of researchers and archivists of the Office for Historical Research, thereby constituting the tactical and logistical core for the production of the Historical Series.

== Aims ==
Methodologically, Ciampi viewed the Historical Series as first and foremost a precious tool serving the present-day decision-making of the Bank. In essence, Ciampi saw the contribution of historical research to macroeconomic policymaking through Schumpeterian lens. Indeed, Ciampi posited that theory and statistical methodology should necessarily be combined by central banks “with a historical perspective, without which one’s pursuit would not reach the calibre of economic analysis”.

In addition to this institutional aim, there existed a more academic and scientific one: “to provide historians and scholars of monetary economics with the tools needed to conduct research on the history of our institution”. In this sense then, the Historical Series was seen as “a laboratory of sorts” through which to launch new strands of historical and economic research, rather than as an attempt by the Bank of Italy to write her own official history.

This scientific aspiration, already intrinsic to the very conception of the Historical Series, rendered objectivity necessary, hence the decision to turn to prominent academics external to the Bank in order to independently curate the volumes of the Historical Series. This choice thus ensured that the “needs of those who commissioned” the work would be constrained, thereby preserving the scientific validity of the project.

Therein was grounded the appointment of the prominent historian Carlo M. Cipolla as scientific consultant of the publication, after the 1987 disappearance of the economist to whom the position had initially been offered, Federico Caffè. Moreover, crucial curatorial duties were assigned, particularly for the Documents series, to important personalities external to the Bank, including Marcello de Cecco, Giuseppe Guarino, Luigi Spaventa and Gianni Toniolo. These contributions not only reduced the risk of arbitrariness in the selection of the archival material to be published, but they also led to the production of wide-ranging introductions at the start of each volume, aimed at facilitating the interpretation and contextualisation of the published material.

== Structure ==
As of 2020, the Collana Storica della Banca d’Italia consists of 46 volumes, covering over 26,000 pages, and divided into four sub-series: Documents, Statistics, Analyses, Essays and Research.

The Documents series (16 volumes) aims to showcase the most important and representative primary sources among those of the Historical Archive of the Bank of Italy, mainly official documents internal to the Bank, such as the minutes of the governing council, the correspondence of senior Bank officials, their speeches at public assemblies and international conferences, and rare printed materials. The Statistics series (8 volumes), which was commenced with estimates on aggregate output in the three sectors of the economy, together with works on prices and international trade, has been continued with research on balance sheet data of the Italian banks of issue, on the Italian banking system from the 1890s, and on the reconstruction of the Italian GDP from 1861 to the present day. The Analyses series (15 volumes) presents analyses of specific themes of Italian monetary and economist history from the late 19th century, grouped into theme-specific compendia, that were prepared by scholars both external and internal to the Bank. The fourth sub-series is the Essays and Research series (7 volumes), launched in 2000, which includes monographs on specific themes, like biographies and examinations of individual events or phenomena.

Digital copies of every volume can be freely consulted in Italian on the website of the Bank of Italy. The site also provides, in both Italian and English, the title, index and description of each volume and a section named ‘critical apparatus’, which provides interested readers with further valuable material.

== Recent developments ==
The Historical Series is still very much evolving and growing, as exemplified by the important works that were published recently – for instance, Baffigi (2015) on the yearly reconstruction of Italian GDP from 1861 (Statistics series, V volume), Gigliobianco e Toniolo (eds.) (2017) on competition and growth (Analyses series, XIII volume), and Toniolo (ed.) (2013) (Analyses series, XII volume), which brings together the research produced for the reaching of 150 years of Italian economic history. This was presented at the conference Italy and the World Economy, 1861-2011, which took place at Palazzo Koch in 2011. Indeed, ever since its inception, the editorial plan for the publication series has remained “open in character” .

Over the years, the Economic History Division of the Bank of Italy, the successor body of the original Office for Historical Research of the Bank, has continued operating on further fronts parallel to that of the Historical Series. For example, the Division has produced an economic history working paper series, the Quaderni di Storia Economica, in which 45 papers have been published over 2009–19. Furthermore, the Bank has also hosted over the years two editions of the CEPR Economic History Symposium – the first in Perugia in 2013, and the sixth in Rome in 2018.

The scientific committee that coordinates the activities surrounding the Historical Series is chaired to this day by the sitting Governor of the Bank of Italy – currently, Ignazio Visco.

== List of volumes published ==
The full list of volumes hitherto published, divided into the four series, is as follows:

=== Documents ===
Volume list:

- I Italy and the International Financial system, 1861-1914, edited by Marcello de Cecco, 1990.
- II Institutes of Issue in Italy. Attempts of Unification, 1843-1892, edited by Renato De Mattia, 1990.
- III Giolitti and the Birth of the Bank of Italy in 1893, edited by Guglielmo Negri, 1989.
- IV The Bank of Italy since 1894 to 1913. Moments of the Formation of a Central Bank, edited by Franco Bonelli, 1991.
- V The Bank of Italy and the War Economy, 1914-1919, edited by Gianni Toniolo, 1989.
- VI Italy and the International Financial System, 1919-1936, edited by Marcello de Cecco, 1993.
- VII The Bank of Italy and the Banking System, 1919-1936, edited by Giuseppe Guarino and Gianni Toniolo, 1993.
- VIII Monetary Policy between the Two Wars, 1919-1935, edited by Franco Cotula and Luigi Spaventa, 1993.
- IX The Bank of Italy between Autarky and the War, 1936-1945, edited by Alberto Caracciolo, 1992.
- X The Bank of Italy and the Post-War Recovery, 1945-1948, edited by Sergio Ricossa and Ercole Tuccimei, 1992.
- XI Luigi Einaudi, Diary 1945-1947, edited by Paolo Soddu - Luigi Einaudi Foundation, Torino, 1993.
- XII.1 The Normative of the Bank of Italy from its Origins to Today, edited by Consulenza legale della Banca d’Italia, 1992.
- XII.2 The Normative of the Bank of Italy from its Origins to Today (chronological index), edited by Consulenza legale della Banca d’Italia, 1992.
- XIII.1 Donato Menichella. Stability and Development of the Italian Economy, 1946-1960 (Documents and Speeches), edited by Franco Cotula, Cosma O. Gelsomino and Alfredo Gigliobianco, 1997.
- XIII.2 Donato Menichella. Stability and Development of the Italian Economy, 1946-1960 (Concluding Observations), edited by Franco Cotula, Cosma O. Gelsomino and Alfredo Gigliobianco, 1997.
- XIV The Power of the Image. Portrait of the Banca Nazionale in 1868, edited by Marina Miraglia, 2003.

=== Statistics ===
Volume list:

- I.1 The Economic Accounts of Italy. A Summary of Official Sources 1890-1970, edited by Guido M. Rey, 1991.
- I.2 The Economic Accounts of Italy. An Estimate of the Value Added in 1911, edited by Guido M. Rey. Writings of: Giovanni Federico, Stefano Fenoaltea, Mauro Marolla, Massimo Roccas, Ornello Vitali and Vera Zamagni, 1992.
- I.3° The Economic Accounts of Italy. Resources and Uses Account (1891, 1911, 1938, 1951), edited by Guido M. Rey. Writings of: Guido M. Rey, Ornello Vitali, Giovanna Pedullà, Antonello Biagioli, Claudio Picozza and Sandro Clementi, 2002.
- I.3°° The Economic Accounts of Italy. The Value Added for 1891, 1938, 1951, edited by Guido M. Rey. Writings of: Giovanni Federico, Stefano Fenoaltea, Carlo Bardini, Vera Zamagni and Patrizia Battilani, 2000.
- II The Balance Sheet Accounts of Banks of Issue 1894-1990, edited by Massimiliano Caron and Luciano Di Cosmo, 1993.
- III Balance Account Sheets of Credit Institutions 1890-1936, edited by Franco Cotula, Tullio Raganelli, Valeria Sannucci, Stefania Alieri and Elio Cerrito, 1996.
- IV Italy's Foreign Trade 1862-1950, by Giovanni Federico, Sandra Natoli, Giuseppe Tattara and Michelangelo Vasta, 2011.
- V GDP for Italy's History. A User's Manual, by Alberto Baffigi, 2015.

=== Analyses ===
Volume list:

- I Essays on the history of the Bank of Italy, Writings of Sergio Cardarelli, Pierluigi Ciocca, Alfredo Gigliobianco, Peter Hertner, Massimo Roccas, Valeria Sannucci, Ercole Tuccimei and Adalberto Ulizzi, 1990.
- II Essays on the history of the Bank of Italy, edited by Franco Cotula. Writings of Alberto Baccini, Domenicantonio Fausto, Giuseppe Felicetti, Andrea Ripa di Meana, Giancarlo Salvemini and Vera Zamagni, 1993.
- III Essays on the history of the Bank of Italy, Writings of Pier Francesco Asso, Andrea Santorelli, Marina Storaci and Giuseppe Tattara, 1993.
- IV Essays on the history of the Bank of Italy, Writings of Alberto M. Contessa, Angelo De Mattia, Pasquale Ferro, Giuseppe Mulone and Ercole Tuccimei, 1993.
- V Essays on the history of the Bank of Italy, Writings of Stefano Baia Curioni, Rita Brizi, Giovanni Ferri, Paolo Garofalo, Cosma O. Gelsomino, Sandra Petricola and Vera Zamagni, 1994.
- VI Essays on the history of the Bank of Italy, Writings of Gian Carlo Falco, Giorgio Fodor, Alberto Monticone and Gabriella Raitano, 1995.
- VII Stability and development in the fifties, edited by Franco Cotula, 2000.
- VIII The Bank of Italy in Africa, by Ercole Tuccimei, 1999.
- IX The Bretton Woods Agreements. Building an International Monetary Order, by Filippo Cesarano, 2000.
- X Technological Innovation and Industrial Development post-WWII, by Cristiano Antonelli, Federico Barbiellini Amidei, Renato Giannetti, Matteo Gomellini, Sabrina Pastorelli and Mario Pianta, 2007.
- XI History of Banking, Financial and Insurance legislation. From Italy's Unification to 2011, by Enrico Galanti, Raffaele D'Ambrosio and Alessandro V. Guccione, 2012.
- XII Italy and the World Economy since Unification, edited by Gianni Toniolo, 2013.
- XIII Competition and Growth in Italy in the Long Run, edited by Alfredo Gigliobianco and Gianni Toniolo, 2017.

=== Essays and Research ===
Volume list:

- I The Origins of Central Banks Cooperation. The Establishment of the Bank for International Settlements, by Paolo Baffi, 2002.
- II The Governor Vincenzo Azzolini 1931-1944, by Alessandro Roselli, 2000.
- III The Nazi and the Gold of the Bank of Italy. Subtraction and Recovery 1943-1958, by Sergio Cardarelli and Renata Martano, 2000.
- IV The Bank of Italy. Summary of the Historical Research 1893-1960, edited by Franco Cotula, Marcello De Cecco and Gianni Toniolo, 2003.
- V Shares and Shareholders. The Long Nineteenth Century of the Bank of Italy, by Rosanna Scatamacchia, 2008.
- VI Luigi Einaudi: Economic Freedom and Social Cohesion, edited by Alfredo Gigliobianco, 2010.
- VII The Roots of the Italian Welfare State: the Origins and Future of an Unbalanced Social Model, by Maurizio Ferrera, Valeria Fargion and Matteo Jessoula, 2012.
