= Attilio Celant =

Italian economist, geographer and academic

- Born: 28 December 1942 (age 83); Polcenigo, Friuli-Venezia Giulia, Italy (present-day Rome, Italy)

Academic background
- Education: Sapienza University of Rome (B.A.)
- Influences: Federico Caffè; John Maynard Keynes; Joseph Schumpeter; Gunnar Myrdal; Amartya Sen; Alfred Weber; Walter Christaller; Alfred Marshall

Academic work
- Discipline: Development economics, Development geography, Tourism, Sahel, Tertiary sector of the economy, Regional imbalances
- Institutions: Sapienza University of Rome; University of Pennsylvania; University of Udine; Luiss Guido Carli
- Awards: 2nd Class / Grand Officer Order of Merit of the Italian Republic

Attilio Celant (born 28 December 1942 in Polcenigo), 2nd Class / Grand Officer of the Order of Merit of the Italian Republic, is an Italian economist, geographer and academic.

He is currently the President of the “Alumni Association of Graduates in Economics“ at Sapienza University of Rome

In 1968, he graduated in Economics at "Sapienza" University of Rome. From 1969 to 1972 he was editor at the Enciclopedia Italiana di scienze, lettere ed arti – Treccani (“Italian Encyclopaedia of Science, Letters, and Arts”) and from 1972 to 2000 he was the head of both Geography and Map-making publishing units.

Attilio Celant began his university teaching tenure in 1971 and was assistant professor a year later. He was promoted to associate professor in 1982 and in 1986 he became a tenured professor. In 1989 Celant was granted full professor.

In June 2005, he was appointed “Grande Ufficiale” (Grand Officer) of the Order of Merit of Italian Republic.

== Academic career ==
=== “Sapienza” University of Rome” ===
- Member of the Academic Senate as Dean of the Faculty of Economics (2002–2011)
- Chairman of the Board of Department Directors (1997–2002)
- Member of the Board of Directors (1998–2002)
- President of the federated faculties of Science Humanities, Law and Economics (2007–2008)

=== “Sapienza” University of Rome – Faculty of Economics ===
- Assistant Professor of Economic Geography (1971–1983).
- Professor of Economic Geography for the academic year of 1971/72 and the academic years from 1973/74 to 1982/83.
- Associate Professor of Economic Geography (1983–1986).
- Tenured Professor of Economic Geography (1986–1989).
- Full Professor of Economic Geography (1989–present).
- Director of the extended learning course in "Economics of Tourism" (1998–2000).
- Director of the Master in "Economics and Tourism Management" (2000–2010).
- Director of Geoeconomic Studies, Linguistics, Statistics, History for Regional Analysis Department (1994–2002).
- Dean of the Faculty of Economics of "Sapienza" University of Rome (2002–2011).

=== ”LUISS” University – Faculty of Economics ===
- Tenured Professor of Political and Economic Geography (1985–1986).

=== University of Udine – Faculty of Foreign Languages and Literatures ===
- Tenured Professor of Political and Economic Geography (1986–1989).
- Full Professor of Political and Economic Geography (1989–1991).

=== University of Pennsylvania – State College – Dept. of Geography ===
- Visiting Professor (1982).

=== Tbilisi State University – Faculty of Economics ===
- Visiting Professor (2012).

== Membership and Associations ==
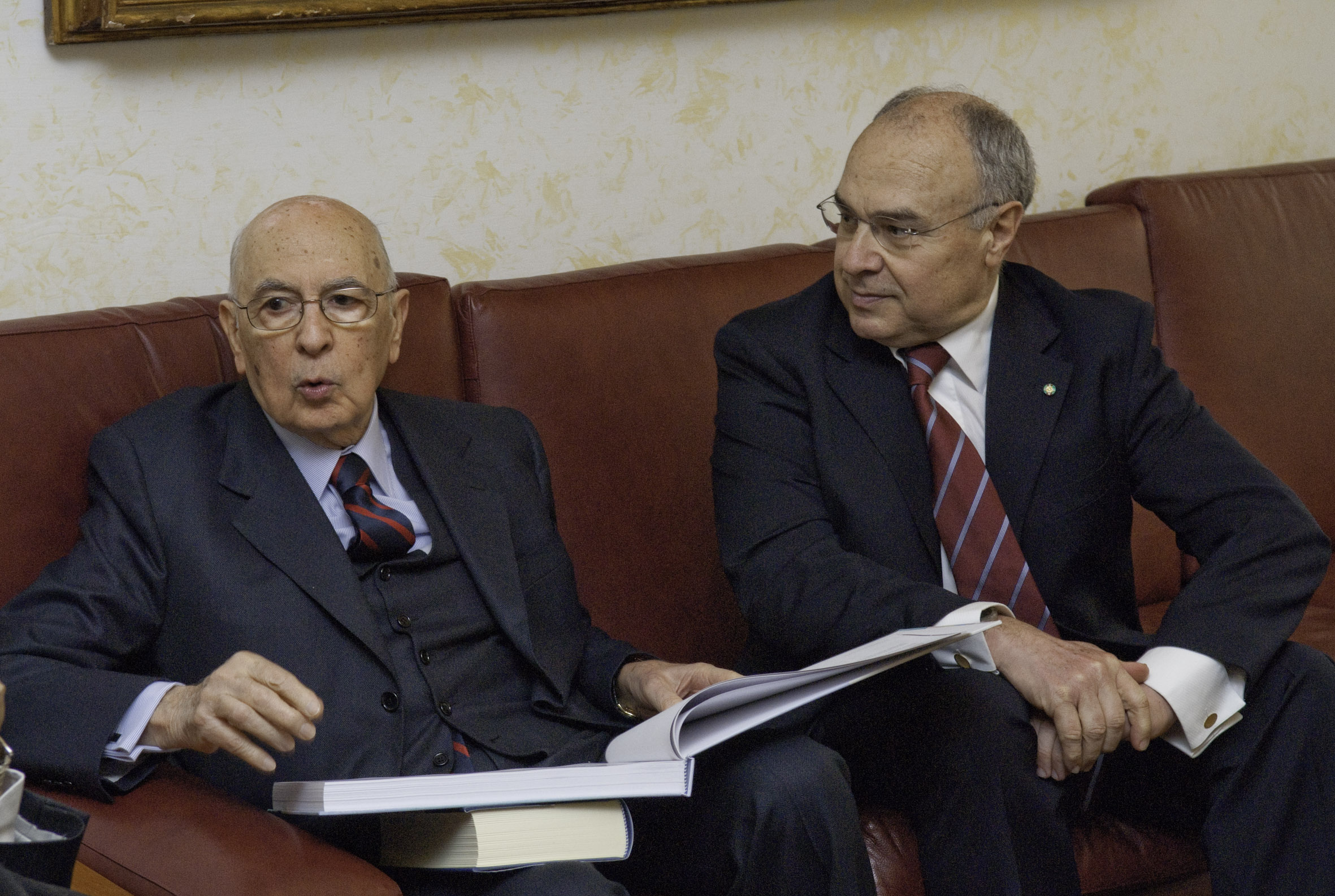
President Giorgio Napolitano and Prof. Celant before a meeting in 2009.

Celant currently serves as President of the “Alumni Association of Graduates in Economics“ at La Sapienza University of Rome. The association serves as a catalyst for the diffusion of economic knowledge and best business practices by many Italian and international leaders on a worldwide stage (among the most noted members: Mario Draghi, Ignazio Visco, Federico Caffè, Enrico Giovannini, Nicola Acocella, Pier Carlo Padoan, Ezio Tarantelli, Marcello De Cecco, Claudio De Vincenti, Vincenzo Polillo, Cesare Romiti, Andrea Guerra, Luigi Spaventa).

Celant also serves as the Director of Territory Research Unit at ItaliaDecide, an Italian think tank which links institutions, politicians, administrative offices and scientific and cultural world.

He is a member of the Board of Directors of the “Società Geografica Italiana” (Italian Geographical Society).

He is also a member of the management board of the Italian Centre for American Studies.

== Research ==
Attilio Celant developed his expertise on several research fields, including regional development and territorial imbalances issues, with particular focus to the “Questione Meridionale” (“Southern Issue”). He also conducted research on developing countries with focus on the Indian region and the area of Sahel.

He addressed issues concerning geographical methodology and the quantitative tools used for its study. He contributed to the evolution of geographical thought and tourism development including its impact with the local economies and territories. He also dealt with issues of international trade, with particular attention to regional competitiveness factors.

Professor Celant attended several National Congresses about Geography, where he submitted his own contributions, conducted basic relationships (Turin 1986) and participated in discussions over the invited papers (Trieste 1996, for the inaugural round table). He took part in numerous international congresses of Geography by presenting his well-known works: Montréal (1972), Moscow (1976), Tokyo (1980).

- 1986: Principal speaker at the "Conference on Geographic Research in Italy 1960–1980". He also took part to annual conferences of "Association of American Geographers – AAG", "Regional Science Association – RSA" and of "Italian Association of Regional Science" (it.: “AISRE”).
- 1979–1990: Head of the national research groups working on issues relating to: "Development and Underdevelopment: Third World countries", "Tradition and modernity in the development process of Sahel area countries."
- 1982–1990: Coordinated both the Transportation Project operating unit and the Italian Economics Project. Both projects were promoted and financed by the Consiglio Nazionale delle Ricerche – CNR (National Research Council).
- 1989–1991: Coordinator of the "Ministero dell'Istruzione, dell'Università e della Ricerca – MIUR" (Ministry of Education, Universities and Research) National Research on thematic Cartography.
- 1991–1993: Participated in the project "Quadroter Man and Environment" of the Consiglio Nazionale delle Ricerche – CNR (National Research Council).
- 1995–1997: Local Coordinator of the National Research Council project "Tourism as a factor for growth, competitiveness and employment in the South".
- 1997–1998: Local coordinator of the project "Tourism and regional imbalances" within the Tourism Strategic Project financed by the National Research Council.
- 1999–2000: National Coordinator of the "Innovation and technology management and enhancement of environmental quality for the farm" project within POM Measure 2.
- 2000–2001: Local coordinator of the project "Tourism and regional imbalances: the role of minor tourist sites" within the "Tourism and Economic Development" Second Strategic Project of the National Research Council.
- 2002–2004: Scientific Coordinator of the "Tourism and productive growth: local factors and competitiveness of territory" National PRIN.
- 2005–2007: National Scientific Coordinator of "Tourism development and territorial transformations. Urban areas, ecosystems and regional complexity." of Prin.

== Notable publishing and media activities ==
- 1983–1986: Attilio Celant contributed to the scientific conception, implementation and publication of “Italy Trade-Economic Atlas" (it: “Atlante economico-commerciale d’Italia”).
- 1974 to present: Co-Director of the “Geography and Society” (it.: “Geografia e Società”) book series which contains over eighty published volumes.
- 1985–1990: Co-Director of the Higher Studies Geography books series.
- 2000–2002: Co-Director of the first edition of the Piccola Enciclopedia Italiana (Treccani), two vols., 2002.
- 2002–2005: Co-director of the 21st century-Appendix VII of the Grande Enciclopedia Italiana, three vols. (2006–2007).
- 2006–2009: Co-director of the 21st century opera in six vols., 2009–2010 Grande Enciclopedia Italiana.
- 2009–2012: Economic Opinionist for ”TG1 Economia”, economical edition of the Italian state-owned TV channel Rai1's news programmes.

== Personal life ==
Prof. Celant lives in Rome with his wife Alberta who is a retired teacher. They have three children: Simone, Chiara and Lucia.

== Honors ==
- 2nd Class / Grand Officer Order of Merit of the Italian Republic

== Awards ==
- “Premio San Marco” (San Marco Prize), sponsored by Accademia San Marco in Pordenone (Italy), awarded to Prof. Celant as "an example to follow and reference point for both the national and international academic world".

== Published works ==
- Celant, A. [1970], "Geografia e sviluppo regionale: un approccio metodologico per l'individuazione di unità territoriali intermedie", in: Notiziario di Geografia Economica, Roma.
- Celant, A. [1970], "Pordenone: la 4ª provincia della regione Friuli-Venezia Giulia", in: Notiziario di Geografia Economica, Roma.
- Celant, A. [1971], Didattica e contenuti scientifici della geografia: un divario da attenuare, Le Monnier, Firenze.
- Celant, A. [1971], "Bolzano: le previsioni demografiche e il ruolo della geografia", in: Notiziario di Geografia Economica, Roma.
- Celant, A. [1971], "La siderurgia di Bolzano: il caso di un insediamento volontaristico", in: Notiziario di Geografia Economica, Roma.
- Celant, A. [1972], Biblioteca di Geografia Economica, Le Monnier, Firenze.
- Celant, A. [1972], Indagine sull'insegnamento della geografia a livello d'istruzione secondaria e ipotesi per una didattica multimediale, RAI, Roma.
- Celant, A. [1972], "La teoria dei Grafi: uno strumento di analisi della geografia economica", in: Rivista di Politica Economica, Roma.
- Celant, A. [1975], "La siderurgia nel mondo", in: Massi, E. [1975], La Geografia dell’acciaio, vol. 2°, Giuffrè, Milano.
- Celant, A. [1976], "Trasporti e porti del Mezzogiorno nel quadro della politica meridionalista", in: Rivista di Politica Economica, Roma.
- Celant, A. et al. [1977], Il 23º Congresso geografico internazionale, Società geografica italiana, Roma. IT\ICCU\PUV\0582168
- Celant, A. et al. [1977], Funzione della geografia in un mondo in trasformazione: Atti del Seminario in onore di C. Della Valle, ed. E. Migliorini, s.n.
- Celant, A. et al. [1979], I nuovi programmi della scuola media: guida all'innovazione didattica e all'educazione democratica, Marsilio, Venezia.
- Celant, A. [1979], "Il Mezzogiorno italiano", in: Europa e Regione.
- Celant, A. and Migliorini, P. [1979–80], translation and editing of thirteen volumes of: Geografia e Storia del Mondo, Laterza, Roma-Bari.
- Celant, A. (ed.) [1983], Italian edition of the volume: Huggett, R. Analisi dei sistemi e spazio geografico, Franco Angeli, Milano. ISBN 978-88-20443-43-6.
- Celant, A. et al. [1983], Terzo mondo e nuove strategie di sviluppo, Franco Angeli, Milano.
- Celant, A. and Vallega, A. (eds.) [1984], Il pensiero geografico in Italia, Franco Angeli, Milano.
- Celant, A. [1986], La geografia dei divari territoriali in Italia, Sansoni, Firenze.
- Celant, A. (ed.) [1988], Nuova città, nuova campagna: l'Italia nella transizione, Pàtron, Bologna.
- Celant, A. et al. [1988], Nuova città, nuova campagna, spazio fisico e territorio, Pàtron, Bologna.
- Celant, A. et al. [1989], Struttura urbana e terziario alle imprese, CNR, Milano.
- Celant, A. [1990], I fondamenti della Geografia Economica, Kappa, Roma.
- Celant, A. [1990], "Una classificazione della rete urbana italiana secondo la dotazione di servizi alle imprese", in: Quaderni di Studi e Ricerche – n. 2, Pubblicazione del Dipartimento, Roma.
- Celant, A. [1992], "Caratteri generali e dinamica recente del fenomeno urbano in Italia", in: Dematteis, G. (ed.), Il fenomeno urbano in Italia: interpretazioni, prospettive, politiche, Angeli, Milano.
- Celant, A. [1993], "Città e terziario. I servizi alle famiglie e alle imprese per la valutazione dell’effetto città", in: Ecologia antropica, gennaio-agosto.
- Celant, A. [1993], "Il Sahel: un sistema in crisi. Le ragioni alla base del processo di destrutturazione di una regione storico-naturale", in: Rivista Geografica Italiana, dicembre.
- Celant, A. [1994], Geografia degli squilibri: i fattori economici e territoriali nella formazione e nell'andamento dei divari regionali in Italia, Kappa, Roma.
- Celant, A. [1994], "Logica sistemica e compartimentazione territoriale: le città metropolitane", in: Scritti in onore di Mario Lo Monaco, Kappa, Roma.
- Celant, A. [1994], Geografia degli squilibri, Kappa, Roma.
- Celant, A. [1994], Eliminating the Gap. Public Policies and the Development of the Italian South, Restructuring Processes in Italy, Società Geografica Italiana, Roma.
- Celant, A. (ed.) [1995], Sahel. Geografia di una sconfitta, Pacini, Pisa.
- Celant, A. [1999], "Turismo e squilibri regionali", in: Rivista Geografica Italiana, Firenze.
- Celant, A. [1999], "Gli apporti del turismo e il loro contributo alla formazione degli squilibri territoriali in Italia", in: Colantoni, M. (ed.) Turismo: una tappa per la ricerca, Pàtron, Bologna.
- Celant, A. [1999], "Per una geografia del commercio estero italiano", in: Celant, A. (ed.) Commercio estero e competitività internazionale. Imprese e squilibri territoriali in Italia, SGI, Roma.
- Celant, A. [1999], Il turismo come fattore di crescita, competitività e occupazione nel Mezzogiorno e nel contesto delle regioni italiane ed europee, contributi presentati al Convegno di Pontignano, Siena 14-15 settembre 1998.
- Celant, A. [2000], "Caratteri locali, ambiente e sostenibilità come risorse competitive nei percorsi per il riequilibrio produttivo dei sistemi territoriali italiani", in: Celant, A. (ed.) Ecosostenibilità e risorse competitive, SGI, Roma.
- Celant, A. (ed.) [2001], Sviluppo rurale e agriturismo di qualità nel mezzogiorno, Pàtron, Bologna.
- Celant, A. (ed.) [2002], Competizione territoriale nelle regioni italiane: la geografia come fattore di crescita economica, Società geografica italiana, Roma.
- Celant, A. (ed.) [2002], Supplemento Piccola Treccani, Roma.
- Celant, A. (ed.) [2003], "I siti turistici minori e le zone interne del Mezzogiorno d'Italia", in: Colantoni, M. (ed.), Turismo: fattore di sviluppo, Pàtron, Bologna.
- Celant, A. (ed.) [2004], Turismo e crescita produttiva, i fattori locali e competitività del territorio, Programma Cofin MIUR, Roma.
- Celant, A. [2005], Competitività internazionale e squilibri territoriali. Il ruolo dell’organizzazione territoriale nell’andamento dei divari tra sistemi locali e il declino del Sistema Paese, Roma.
- Celant, A. (ed.) [2007], Global Tourism and Regional Competitiveness, Pàtron, Bologna. ISBN 978-88-55-52921-1.
- Celant, A. (ed.) [2007], Sviluppo turistico e trasformazioni territoriali. Aree urbane, ecosistemi e complessità regionale, Programma Cofin MIUR, Roma.
- Celant, A. and Ferri, M. A. (eds.) [2009], L’Italia. Il declino economico e la forza del turismo, Marchesi Grafiche, Roma. ISBN 978-88-86248-10-5.
- Celant, A. [2010], "Contesto geopolitico, logistica e sistema dei trasporti, in Italia che c’è. Reti territoriali per l’unità e la Crescita", in: Italiadecide rapporto 2010, Il Mulino, Bologna. ISBN 978-88-15-14694-6.
- Celant, A. [2010], "Sviluppo turistico e trasformazioni territoriali. Fattori di forza e fattori di vulnerabilità di un settore produttivo in Italia", in: Scritti in onore di Manlio Resta. ISBN 978-88-13-29917-0.
- Celant, A. (ed.) [2011], 100 anni … e la storia continua. Gli eventi della Facoltà con parole e immagini, Marchesi Grafiche, Roma. ISBN 978-88-86248-16-7.
- Celant, A. [2011], Il turismo nelle regioni dell’Italia di NE.

== See also ==
List of economists

== Official ==
- Official website
- Profile on the Department of Geoeconomic, Language, Statistical and Historical Studies for Regional Analysis webpage

Academic offices
Preceded by Raimondo Cagiano De Azevedo	Dean of the Faculty of Economics; Sapienza University of Rome; 2002–2011	Succeeded by Giuseppe Ciccarone
