= Fabio Panetta =

Italian economist (born 1959)

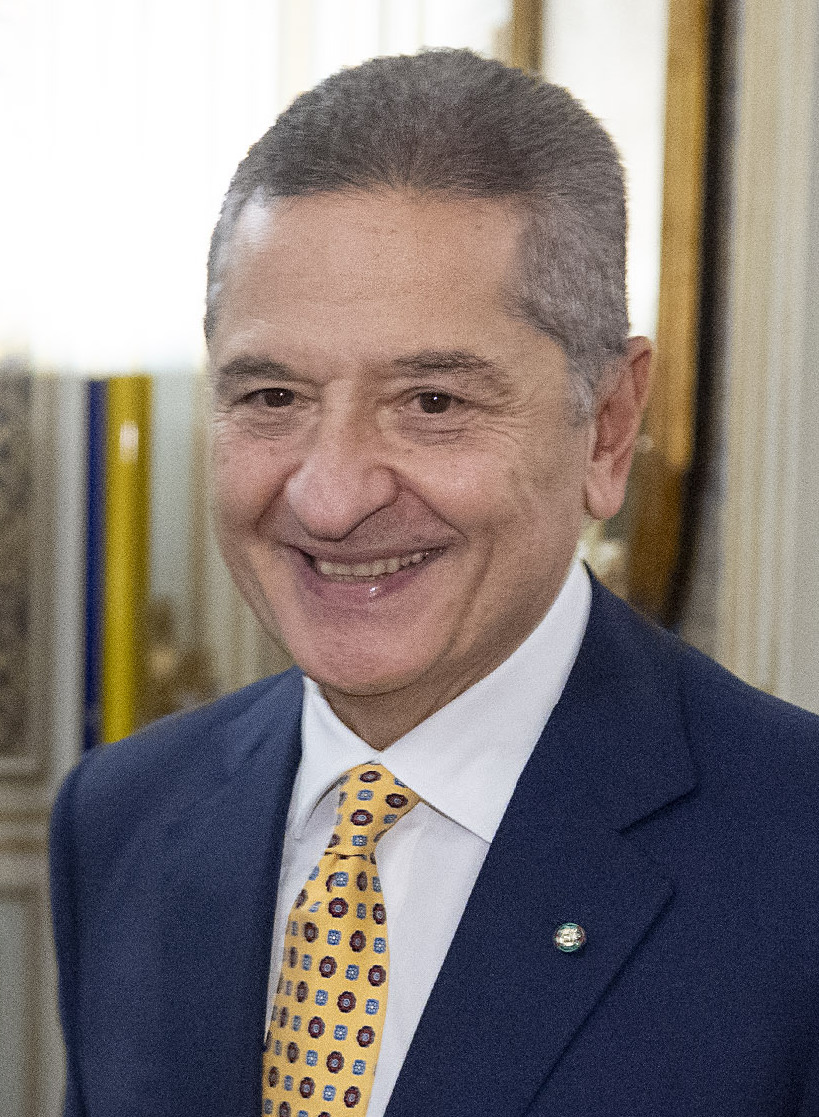

Chair of the Bank for International Settlements
- Incumbent
- Assumed office 3 June 2026
- General Manager: Pablo Hernández de Cos
- Preceded by: François Villeroy de Galhau

Governor of the Bank of Italy
- Incumbent
- Assumed office 1 November 2023
- Preceded by: Ignazio Visco

Member of the Executive Board of the European Central Bank
- In office 1 January 2020 – 31 October 2023
- Preceded by: Benoît Cœuré
- Succeeded by: Piero Cipollone

Director General of the Bank of Italy
- In office 10 May 2019 – 31 December 2019
- Governor: Ignazio Visco
- Preceded by: Salvatore Rossi
- Succeeded by: Daniele Franco

Personal details
- Born: 1 August 1959 (age 67) Rome, Italy
- Education: LUISS University (Laurea); London School of Economics (MSc); London Business School (PhD)

Fabio Panetta (born 1 August 1959) is an Italian economist who has been serving as Governor of the Bank of Italy since 2023. He previously served as a member of the Executive Board of the European Central Bank from 2020 until 2023. Prior to his ECB appointment, Panetta served as Senior Deputy Governor of the Bank of Italy and concurrently as President of the Institute for the Supervision of Insurance from May to December 2019.

== Early life and education ==
The son of the former mayor of Pescosolido (Frosinone), Paolino Panetta, Panetta was born in Rome in 1959. After graduating with honours in Economics from LUISS University (Rome) in 1982, he obtained an M.Sc. in Monetary Economics from the London School of Economics and a Ph.D in Economics and Finance from the London Business School.

== Career ==
Panetta joined the Bank of Italy's Research Department in 1985, becoming Head of its Monetary and Financial Division in 1999. From 2007 to 2011 he headed the Economic Outlook and Monetary Policy Department. In July 2011 he became Managing Director with the task of coordinating the Bank's activities relating to the Eurosystem. From 2010 to 2012 he was Director in charge of the Financial Stability Report.

From 8 October 2012 to 9 May 2019 Panetta served as Deputy Director-General of the Bank of Italy, and immediately after he became Senior Deputy Governor of the Bank of Italy (Presidential Decree of 3 May 2019). He has held important positions and represented the Bank of Italy in numerous European and international institutions, including the OECD, the IMF, the G10, the ECB and the BIS. He is also a member of the directorate of the Bank of Italy and of the Institute for Insurance Supervision as well as a member of the board of directors of the Bank for International Settlements and substitute for the Governor on the ECB's Governing Council. He is also a member of the ECB Supervisory Board, which took over European Banking Supervision on 4 November 2014.

Since 1 January 2020 Panetta has been an Executive Board member at the European Central Bank, replacing the French Benoît Cœuré. He is responsible for the directorates dealing with International and European relations, with market infrastructure, payments and banknotes.

Panetta is known among his colleagues for his staunch defense of Italian banking systems and an opponent of bail-in-rules.

On 27 June 2023, the Italian Council of Ministers, on the proposal of Prime Minister Giorgia Meloni, appointed Panetta as new Governor of the Bank of Italy, succeeding Ignazio Visco starting from 1 November 2023.

== Other activities ==
- Leibniz Institute for Financial Research (SAFE), Member of the Policy Council

== Recognition ==
In December 2019 Panetta was awarded the honorary title of Knight Grand Cross of the Order of Merit of the Italian Republic.

== Personal life ==
Panetta is married and has three children.

Government offices
| Preceded by Anna Maria Tarantola | Deputy Director General of the Bank of Italy; 2012–2019 | Succeeded by Alessandra Perrazzelli |
| Preceded by Salvatore Rossi | Director General of the Bank of Italy; 2019 | Succeeded by Daniele Franco |
| Preceded by Ignazio Visco | Governor of the Bank of Italy; 2023–present | Incumbent |
