= Celant =

Celant is a surname. Notable people with the surname include:

- Attilio Celant (born 1942), Italian economist
- Germano Celant (1940–2020), Italian art historian, critic and curator
