= Fabrizio Saccomanni =

Italian economist and politician (1942–2019)

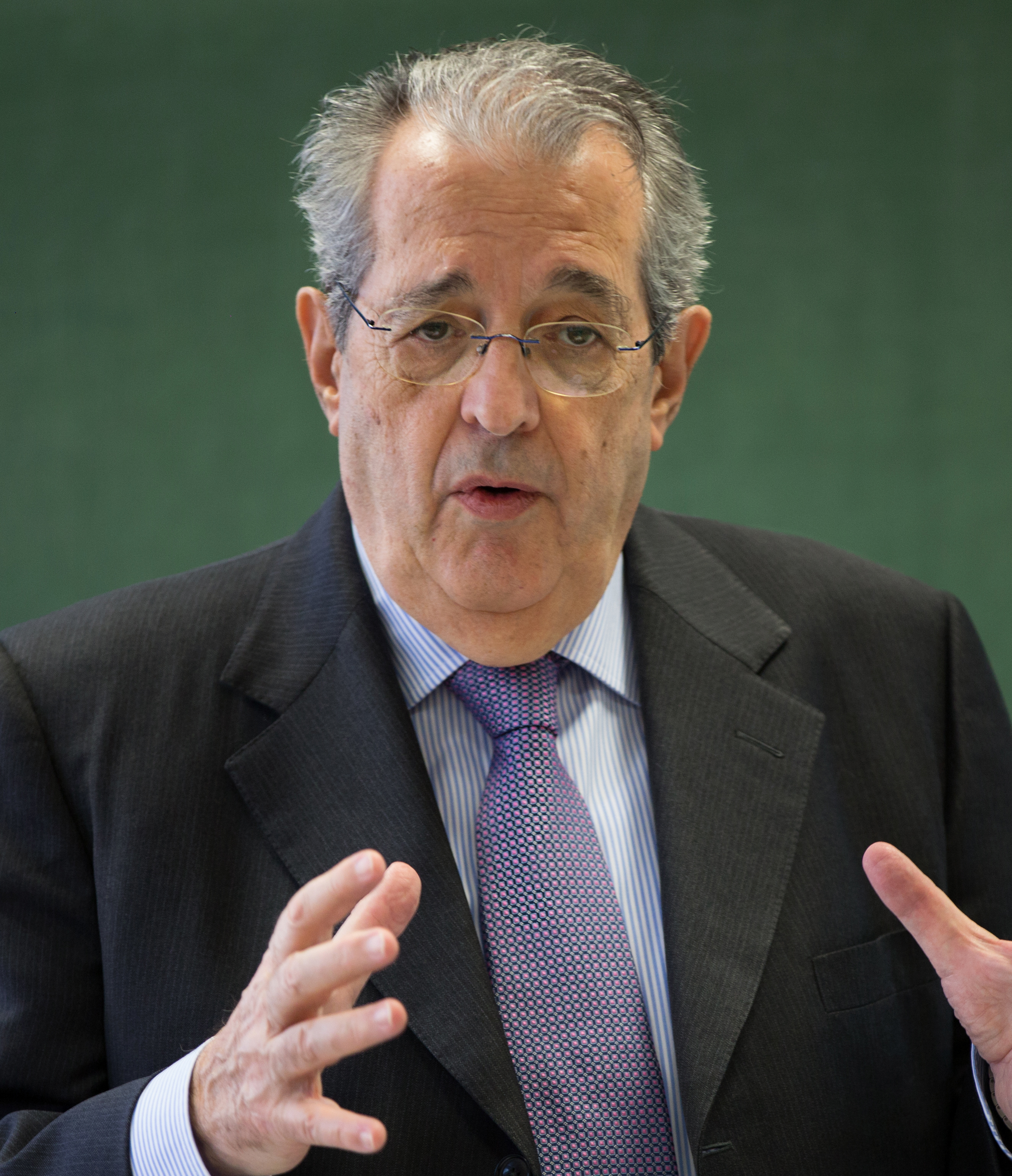

Minister of Economy and Finance
- In office 28 April 2013 – 22 February 2014
- Prime Minister: Enrico Letta
- Preceded by: Vittorio Grilli
- Succeeded by: Pier Carlo Padoan

Director of the Bank of Italy
- In office 2 October 2006 – 28 April 2013
- Governor: Mario Draghi; Ignazio Visco
- Preceded by: Vincenzo Desario
- Succeeded by: Salvatore Rossi

Personal details
- Born: 22 November 1942 Rome, Kingdom of Italy
- Died: 8 August 2019 (aged 76) San Teodoro, Italy
- Party: Independent
- Education: Bocconi University; Princeton University
- Profession: Economist

Fabrizio Saccomanni (22 November 1942 – 8 August 2019) was an Italian economist, civil servant and the director general of the Bank of Italy. He served as minister of economy and finance between April 2013 and February 2014. From 13 April 2018 until his death, Saccomanni was the chairman of UniCredit.

== Early life and education ==
Saccomanni was born in Rome on 22 November 1942. He held a master's degree in economics and business, which he received from the Bocconi University in 1966. He also took postgraduate courses in monetary and international economics at Princeton University.

== Career ==
Saccomanni worked at the Bank of Italy most of his career. His tenure at the bank was only interrupted when he worked at the International Monetary Fund (1970–1975) and at the London-based European Bank for Reconstruction and Development where he served as vice president from 2003 to 2006. He also served as the chairman of the foreign exchange policy committee of the European Monetary Institute from 1991 to 1997 in addition to his post at the Bank of Italy.

He was the director general of the Bank of Italy where he started his career in June 1967. He was appointed to the post on 2 October 2006 and reappointed in 2012. He was also a board member of the Bank for International Settlements and an alternate to the governor of the Bank of Italy in the governing council of the European Central Bank.

Saccomanni was a council member of the European Council on Foreign Relations, an international think-tank which conducts research on European foreign and security policies.

=== Minister of Economy and Finances ===
On 27 April 2013, prime minister-designate Enrico Letta announced that Saccomanni would serve as minister of economy and finances in his cabinet. His term began on 28 April, and he replaced Vittorio Grilli in the post. Saccomanni was one of the technocrats in the Letta cabinet. Saccomanni was replaced by Pier Carlo Padoan as minister of economy and finances on 22 February 2014 when the cabinet led by Matteo Renzi was formed.

== Work, later life and death ==
Saccomanni published a book in 2008 about experiencing financial crisis, Managing international financial stability: National tamers versus global tigers.

In 2011, he was named by his alma mater, Bocconi University, as the alumnus of the year for his "professionalism, entrepreneurial spirit, integrity, responsibility and open-mindedness." In October 2014, Saccomanni was appointed senior advisor to the OMFIF.

Saccomanni died in San Teodoro, Sardinia, on 8 August 2019 at age 76. Upon his death, UniCredit Chief Executive Jean Pierre Mustier stated, "I have lost a friend of great intelligence and humanity, highly competent with a fine sense of culture and wit". As a result of his death, deputy chairman Cesare Bisoni assumed Saccomanni’s role at UniCredit.

Government offices
Preceded by Vincenzo Desario	Director General of the Bank of Italy; 2006–2013	Succeeded by Salvatore Rossi
Political offices
Preceded by Vittorio Grilli	Minister of Economy and Finance; 2013–2014	Succeeded by Pier Carlo Padoan
