= Daniele Franco =

Italian politician

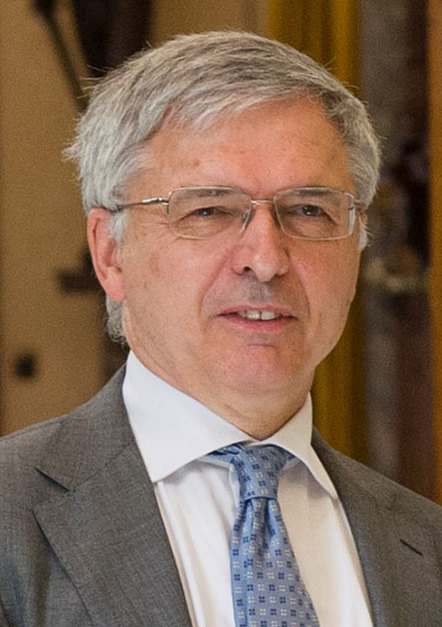

Minister of Economy and Finance
- In office 13 February 2021 – 22 October 2022
- Prime Minister: Mario Draghi
- Preceded by: Roberto Gualtieri
- Succeeded by: Giancarlo Giorgetti

Director-General of the Bank of Italy
- In office 1 January 2020 – 13 February 2021
- Governor: Ignazio Visco
- Preceded by: Fabio Panetta
- Succeeded by: Luigi Federico Signorini

Personal details
- Born: 7 June 1953 (age 73) Trichiana, Italy
- Party: Independent
- Education: University of Padua; University of York

Daniele Franco (born 7 June 1953) is an Italian economist, central banker and civil servant who served as Minister of Economy and Finance in the cabinet of Prime Minister Mario Draghi from 2021 to 2022. From 2020 until 2021, he served as director-general of the Bank of Italy.

== Early life and education ==
Franco graduated from the University of Padua in 1977 with a degree in political science. In 1978, he obtained a master's degree in business organisation from the University Consortium of Business Organization of Padua. In 1979 he obtained a master's degree in economics from the University of York, Great Britain.

== Career ==
In 1979, Franco joined the Bank of Italy.

From 1994 to 1997, Franco was economic advisor to the Directorate-General for Economic and Financial Affairs of the European Commission. From 1997 to 2007, he again worked at the Bank of Italy, where he was director of the public finance section of the Research Department. From 1999 to 2007 he chaired the Public Finance Working Group of the European System of Central Banks.

From 2007 to 2011 he was Head of the Economic and Financial Structure Research Department and from 2011 to 2013 he was Central Director of the Economic Research and International Relations Area. In this capacity, he represents the Bank in committees and working groups in international bodies and is a member of working groups at the Ministry of Finance, the Ministry of the Treasury, the Presidency of the Council and Italian National Institute of Statistics.

From 17 May 2013 to 14 May 2019, Franco served as president of the State General Accounting Office. From 20 May to 31 December 2019 he was Deputy Director-General of the Bank of Italy, after which point he became Director-General.

On 13 February 2021, Franco was appointed Minister of Finance and Economy in the Draghi cabinet. In this capacity, he chaired the meetings of G20 Ministers of Finance when Italy held the group's presidency in 2021.

In 2023, the government of Prime Minister Giorgia Meloni nominated Franco as Italy's candidate to succeed Werner Hoyer as president of the European Investment Bank.

== Other activities ==
=== European Union institutions ===
- European Investment Bank (EIB), Ex-Officio Member of the Board of Governors (2021–2022)
- European Stability Mechanism (ESM), Member of the Board of Governors (2021–2022)

=== International organizations ===
- African Development Bank (AfDB), Ex-Officio Member of the Board of Governors (2021–2022)
- Asian Infrastructure Investment Bank (AIIB), Ex-Officio Member of the Board of Governors (2021–2022)
- European Bank for Reconstruction and Development (EBRD), Ex-Officio Member of the Board of Governors (2021–2022)
- Inter-American Development Bank (IDB), Ex-Officio Member of the Board of Governors (2021–2022)
- International Monetary Fund (IMF), Ex-Officio Member of the Board of Governors (2021–2022)

Government offices
Preceded by Fabio Panetta	Director-General of the Bank of Italy; 2020–2021	Succeeded by Luigi Federico Signorini
Political offices
Preceded by Roberto Gualtieri	Minister of Economy and Finance; 2021–2022	Succeeded by Giancarlo Giorgetti
