= Vittorio Grilli =

Italian economist, academic and politician (born 1957)

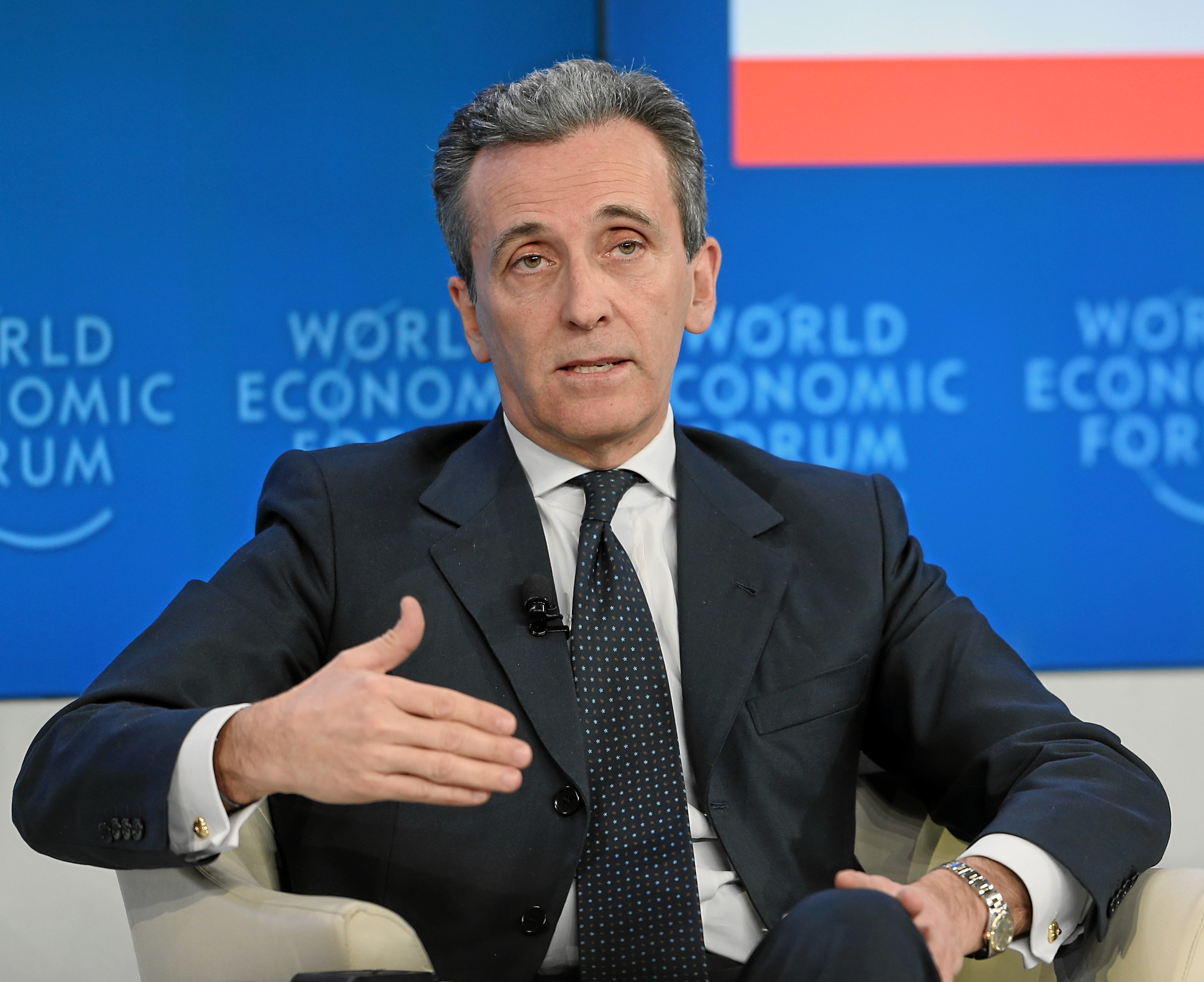
- Grilli during the WEF 2013

Minister of Economy and Finance
- In office 11 July 2012 – 28 April 2013
- Prime Minister: Mario Monti
- Preceded by: Mario Monti
- Succeeded by: Fabrizio Saccomanni

Personal details
- Born: 19 May 1957 (age 69) Milan, Italy
- Party: Independent
- Education: Bocconi University; University of Rochester

Vittorio Grilli (born 19 May 1957) is an Italian economist and academic. He was Italy's minister of economy and finance from 2012 to 2013 as part of the Monti cabinet.

== Education ==
Grilli was born in Milan on 19 May 1957. He graduated from Bocconi University in Milan in 1981 with a master of arts degree in economics. He received a PhD in economics from the University of Rochester in 1986.

== Career ==
Grilli was an assistant professor of economics at the Department of Economics of Yale University from 1986 to 1990. Then he joined the University of London's Birkbeck College as Woolwich Professor of financial economics from 1990 to 1994. He served as head of the department of economics and financial analysis and privatizations at the ministry of treasury, budget and financial programming from 1994 to 2000. Then he became managing director and head of the Italian investment banking Credit Suisse First Boston in London in 2001 and was in office until 2002. Next, he was appointed general accountant of the Italian State in 2002, and his tenure lasted until 2005. He was named as the director general of the Italian treasury in 2005 where he served until 2011. He held the position of sole commissioner of the Italian Institute of Technology foundation and then became its president in the following period. He was made vice-president of the economic and financial committee (EFC) of the European Union in March 2009 and in March 2011, he was chosen to chair the EFC. Grilli's tenure lasted until January 2012, and he was replaced by Thomas Wieser in the post. In September–October 2011, following the appointment of Mario Draghi as president of the European Central Bank, he was one of the possible candidates for the position of governor of the Bank of Italy, but the position went to Ignazio Visco.

Grilli was appointed deputy minister of economy and finances in November 2011, and served in this post until 11 July 2012 prior to his appointment as minister. Grilli swore the next day and the Presidency of the Council announced that he would be permanently invited to attend meetings of the Council of Ministers. Grilli also worked as an advisor to private companies including Enel and Alitalia. He is a member of the European think tank organization Bruegel and of the Aspen Institute Italia.

On 12 May 2014 Grilli became president at Corporate and Investment Bank for Europe, Middle East and Africa for JPMorgan. He is also a member of the European Group at Trilateral Commission.

=== Minister of Economy and Finances ===
Grilli replaced Mario Monti as minister of economy and finances on 11 July 2012. Grilli was also a member of the economic and financial policy coordinating committee established in July 2012 of which other members were Monti, Ignazio Visco, the governor of the Bank of Italy, and Corrado Passera, economic development minister. The committee was chaired by Monti.

On 9 September 2012, Grilli announced that Italy's current financial status was not required to apply for the new euro-zone aid program. In December 2012, he reported that he did not have any plan to work in a government post or a treasury position after the 2013 February general election in Italy. Grilli's term as economy minister ended in April 2013, and Fabrizio Saccomanni succeeded him in the post.

== Other activities ==
Grilli has been a member of the European Group of the Trilateral Commission since June 2022.

== Recognition ==
Grilli was awarded the Gold Medal of Bocconi University (1981), the Saint Vincent Prize for Economics (1992), the Tarantelli Prize for the best economic idea (2004), the 2005 Bocconi Prize, and the Guido Carli Prize for the best new financial initiative - Fund for SMEs (2010). In 2011, he was also awarded Grand Cross Knight (Cavaliere di Gran Croce).

== Personal life ==
Grilli's first spouse, Lisa Lowenstein, is an art expert. It was rumoured that she was hired by the Finmeccanica group as a consultant in September 2012. However, the firm denied the reports.

Political offices
Preceded by Mario Monti	Minister of Economy and Finances; 2012–2013	Succeeded by Fabrizio Saccomanni
