= Minister of Economy and Finance (Italy) =

Ministry in the Cabinet of Italy

- Ministro dell'Economia e delle Finanze

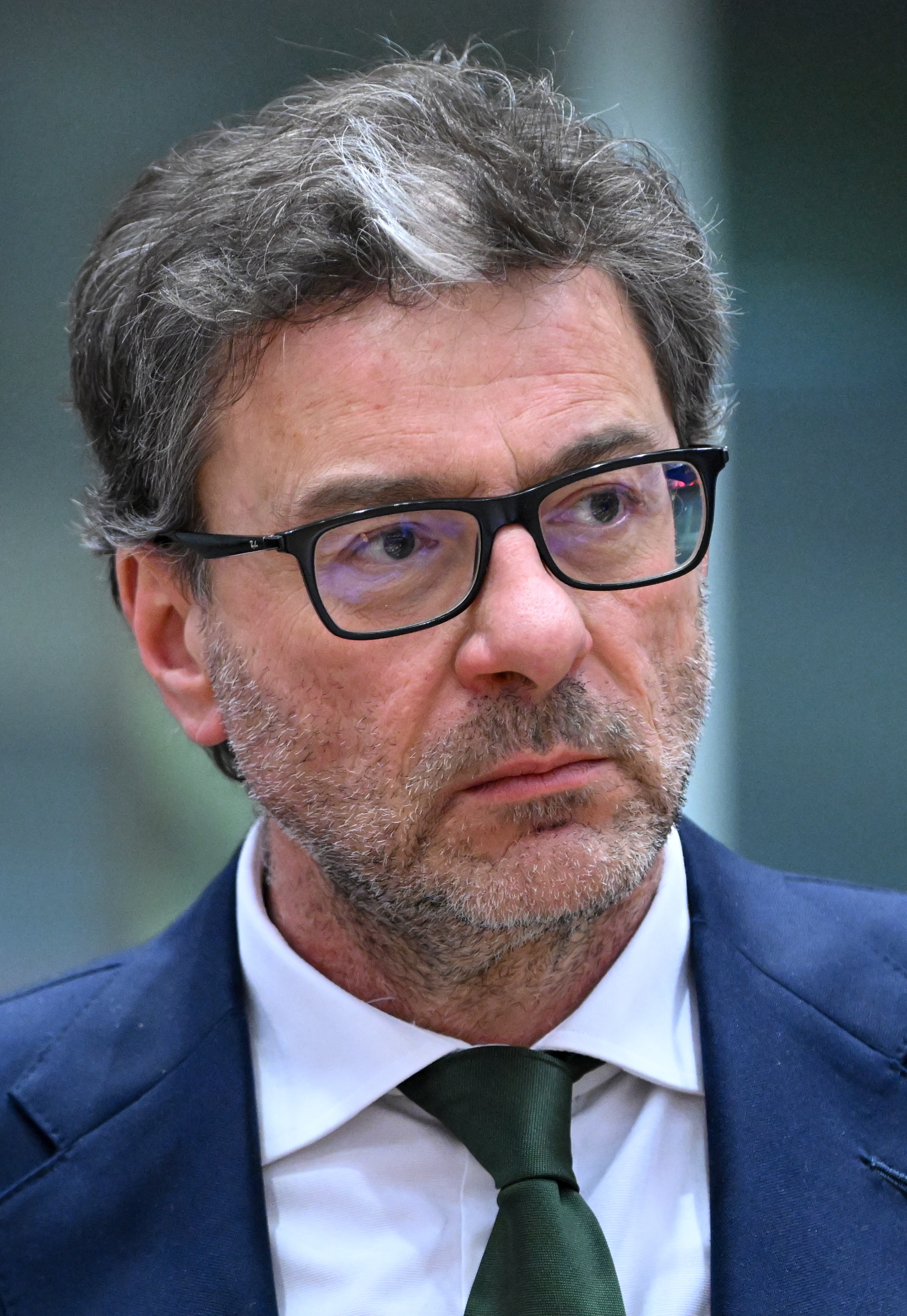
- Incumbent; Giancarlo Giorgetti since October 22, 2022
- Ministry of Economy and Finance
- Member of: Council of Ministers; High Council of Defence; Eurogroup
- Reports to: The prime minister
- Seat: Palazzo delle Finanze, Rome
- Appointer: The president
- Term length: No fixed term
- Precursor: Minister of Finance; Minister of Treasury; Minister of Budget
- Formation: 11 June 2001; 25 years ago
- First holder: Giulio Tremonti
- Website: www.mef.gov.it

The minister of economy and finance (Italian: ministro dell'economia e delle finanze) is a senior member of the Italian Cabinet who leads the Ministry of Economy and Finance since its creation in 2001 by the fusion of three former ministries, the Ministry of Finance, the Ministry of Treasury and the Ministry of Budget.

The first minister of economy and finance was Giulio Tremonti, of Forza Italia, while the current office holder is Giancarlo Giorgetti, who has been acting as minister since 22 October 2022.

== List of ministers ==
=== Economy and finance (2001–present) ===
Parties

- 2001–present:
  - Forza Italia / The People of Freedom
  - Democratic Party
  - League
  - Independent

Governments

- 2001–present:
  - Centre-right coalition
  - Centre-left coalition
  - Mixed coalition

Portrait	Name (Born–Died)	Term of office			Party	Government	Ref.
Portrait	Name (Born–Died)	Took office	Left office	Time in office	Party	Government	Ref.
	Giulio Tremonti (1947–)	11 June 2001	3 July 2004	3 years, 22 days	Forza Italia	Berlusconi II	
	Domenico Siniscalco (1957–)	16 July 2004	22 September 2005	1 year, 68 days	Independent	Berlusconi II·III	
	Giulio Tremonti (1947–)	22 September 2005	8 May 2006	228 days	Forza Italia	Berlusconi iII	
	Tommaso Padoa-Schioppa (1940–2010)	17 May 2006	8 May 2008	1 year, 357 days	Independent	Prodi II	
	Giulio Tremonti (1947–)	8 May 2008	16 November 2011	3 years, 192 days	The People of Freedom	Berlusconi IV	
	Mario Monti (1943–) As Prime Minister	16 November 2011	11 July 2012	238 days	Independent	Monti	
	Vittorio Grilli (1957–)	11 July 2012	28 April 2013	291 days	Independent	Monti	
	Fabrizio Saccomanni (1942–2019)	28 April 2013	22 February 2014	300 days	Independent	Letta	
	Pier Carlo Padoan (1950–)	22 February 2014	1 June 2018	4 years, 99 days	Independent / Democratic Party	Renzi; Gentiloni	
	Giovanni Tria (1948– )	1 June 2018	5 September 2019	1 year, 96 days	Independent	Conte I	
	Roberto Gualtieri (1966–)	5 September 2019	13 February 2021	1 year, 161 days	Democratic Party	Conte II	
	Daniele Franco (1953– )	13 February 2021	22 October 2022	1 year, 251 days	Independent	Draghi	
	Giancarlo Giorgetti (1966– )	22 October 2022	Incumbent	3 years, 320 days	League	Meloni	

== See also ==
- Politics of Italy
