= Mario Monti =

Italian economist and politician (born 1943)

Senator for life Mario Monti OMRI
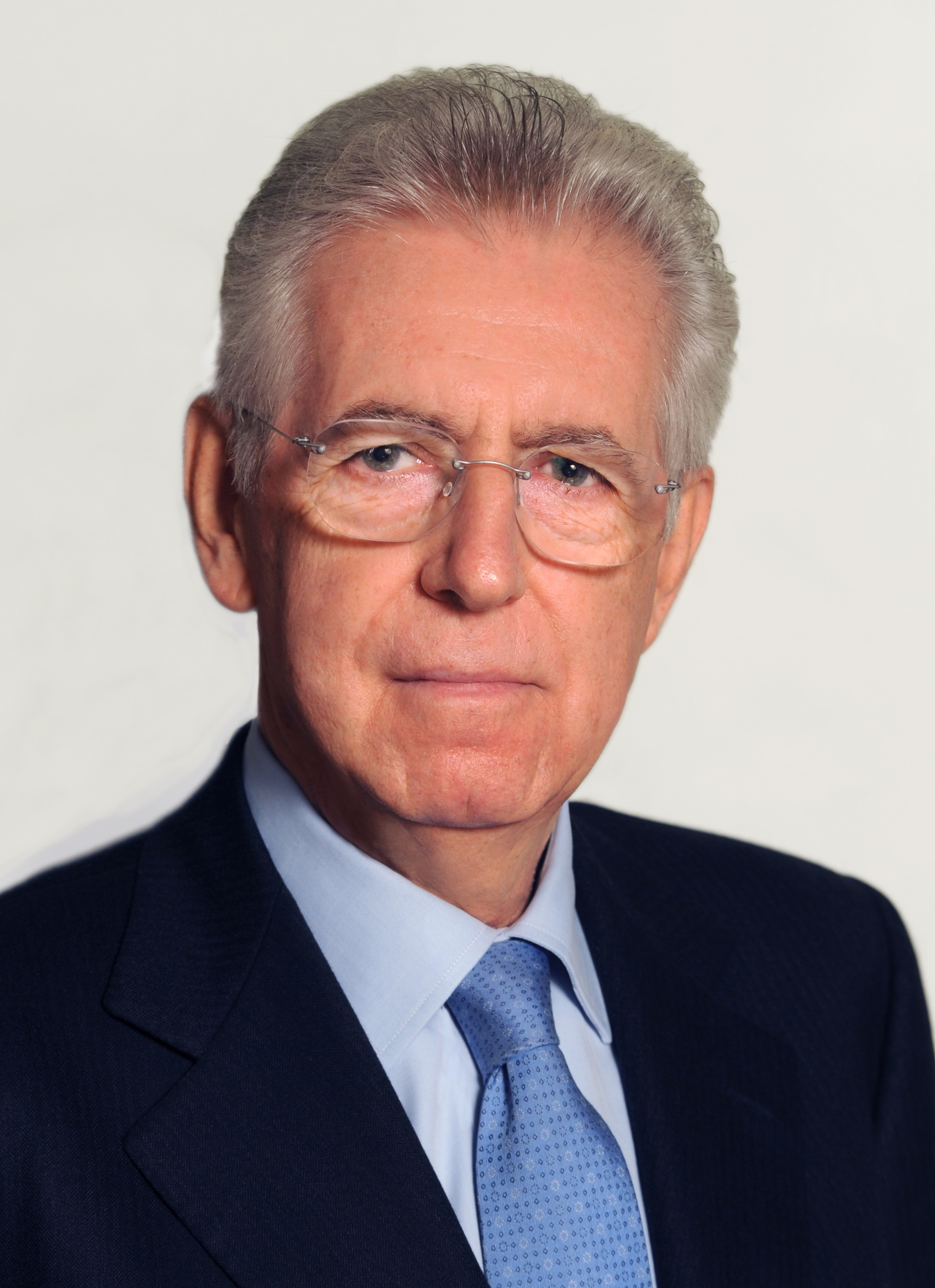
- Monti in 2011

Prime Minister of Italy
- In office 16 November 2011 – 28 April 2013
- President: Giorgio Napolitano
- Preceded by: Silvio Berlusconi
- Succeeded by: Enrico Letta

Minister of Economy and Finance
- In office 16 November 2011 – 11 July 2012
- Prime Minister: Himself
- Preceded by: Giulio Tremonti
- Succeeded by: Vittorio Grilli

European Commissioner for Competition
- In office 15 September 1999 – 30 October 2004
- President: Romano Prodi
- Preceded by: Karel Van Miert
- Succeeded by: Neelie Kroes

European Commissioner for Internal Market, Services, Customs and Taxation
- In office 18 January 1995 – 15 September 1999
- President: Jacques Santer
- Preceded by: Raniero Vanni d'Archirafi
- Succeeded by: Frits Bolkestein

President of Bocconi University
- In office 6 September 1994 – 1 November 2022
- Preceded by: Giovanni Spadolini
- Succeeded by: Andrea Sironi

Member of the Senate of the Republic
- Incumbent
- Life tenure 9 November 2011
- Appointed by: Giorgio Napolitano

Personal details
- Born: 19 March 1943 (age 83) Varese, Lombardy, Kingdom of Italy
- Party: Independent (1995–2013; since 2015); Civic Choice (2013–2015)
- Spouse: Elsa Antonioli (m. 1970)
- Children: 2
- Education: Bocconi University; Yale University

Mario Monti OMRI (Italian: [ˈmaːrjo ˈmonti]; born 19 March 1943) is an Italian politician, economist and academic who served as the prime minister of Italy from 2011 to 2013, leading a technocratic government in the wake of the Italian debt crisis.

Monti served as a European Commissioner from 1995 to 2004, with responsibility for the Internal Market, Services, Customs and Taxation from 1995 to 1999 and for Competition from 1999 to 2004. Monti has also been rector and president of Bocconi University in Milan for many years.

On 12 November 2011, in the midst of the European sovereign debt crisis, Monti was invited by President Giorgio Napolitano to form a new technocratic government following the resignation of Silvio Berlusconi. Monti was sworn in as prime minister on 16 November 2011, just a week after having been appointed a Lifetime Senator by President Napolitano, and initially became Minister of Economy and Finance as well, giving that portfolio up the following July.

From 16 May 2013 to 17 October 2013, Monti was the president of Civic Choice, a centrist political party in Italy.

== Early life ==
Mario Monti was born in Varese on 19 March 1943. His mother was from Piacenza. Although his father grew up in Varese, he was born in Luján in the Buenos Aires Province, Argentina, where his grandfather Abramo had emigrated to from Italy in the 19th century and built up a soft-drink and beer-production business. Monti's father went back to Argentina during World War II but later returned to his family home in Varese.

Monti studied at the private Leo XIII High School and attended Bocconi University of Milan, where he obtained a degree in economics in 1965. Later, he won a scholarship to Yale University, where he studied under James Tobin, a recipient of the Nobel Prize in Economics.

== Academic career ==
Monti began his academic career at the University of Trento, before moving to teach economics at the University of Turin from 1970 to 1985, and finally to Bocconi University, where he was appointed Rector in 1989 and President in 1994. He also served as President of the SUERF (The European Money and Finance Forum) from 1982 to 1985. His research helped to create the "Klein-Monti model", aimed at describing the behaviour of banks operating under monopoly circumstances.

== European Commissioner ==
=== Santer Commission ===
In 1994, Monti was appointed to the Santer Commission, along with Emma Bonino, by Prime Minister Silvio Berlusconi. In his office as a European Commissioner from 1994 to 1999, he was responsible for the internal market, financial services and financial integration, customs, and taxation. His work with the Commission earned him the nickname "Super Mario" from his colleagues and from the press.

=== Prodi Commission ===
In 1999, Prime Minister Massimo D'Alema confirmed Monti's appointment to the new Prodi Commission and he was given one of the most powerful positions at the Commission, with responsibility for Competition.

As Competition Commissioner, Monti led the investigation into a number of high-profile and controversial mergers, including Scania AB and Volvo (1999), WorldCom and Sprint (2000), General Electric and Honeywell (2001), Schneider Electric and Legrand (2001) and Carnival Corporation and P&O Ferries (2002). His term in office also saw the European Court of Justice, for the first time, overrule the Commission's decision to block a merger in three separate cases, although two were decided by his predecessor. Monti was also responsible for levying the EU's largest ever fine at the time (€497 million) against Microsoft for abusing its dominant market position in 2004.

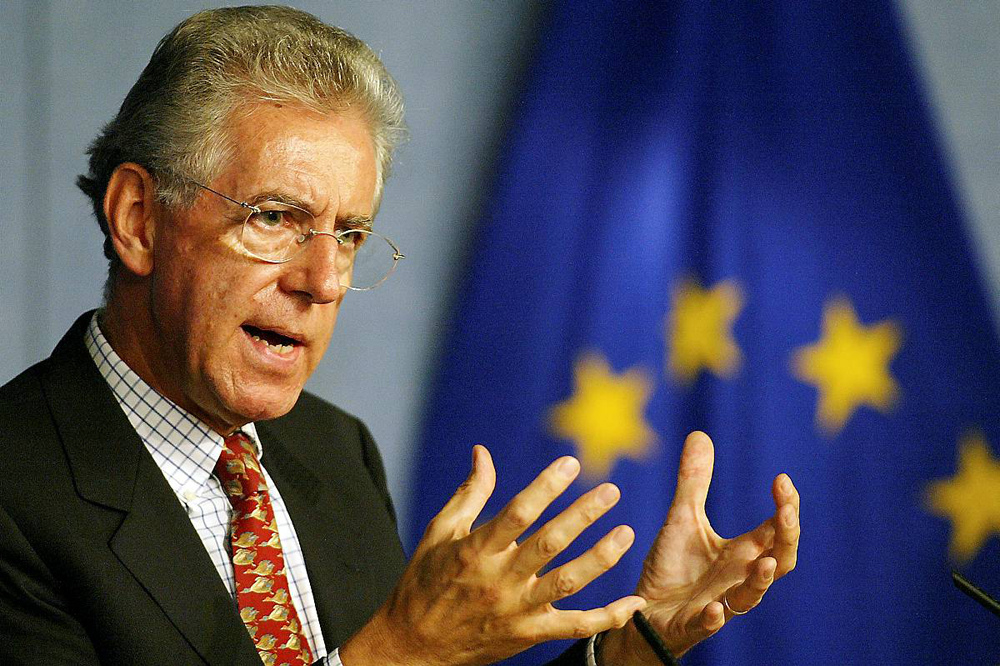
Mario Monti served as a European Commissioner from 1995 to 2004.

Monti was criticised in the media and by competition lawyers for the perceived inflexibility of the merger oversight process and the high number of cases that were being blocked. On 1 November 2002, Monti, responding to the European Court of Justice's ruling which reversed his decision to block the merger between Airtours and First Choice Holidays, said, "Last week was a tough week for the Commission's merger control policy and of course for me." This ruling, in combination with his decision to block the General Electric-Honeywell merger, led to criticism in the United States against both the Commission's procedures and accusations that Monti's decisions were politically motivated. Monti, however, was defended by supporters who saw his actions as an important step in the development of competition law in the EU. Dan Rubinfeld, an economics professor at the University of California who worked on the US Justice Department's antitrust case against Microsoft, said of Monti, "There has been a lot of talk of politics in this and other cases, but I believe he has been driven entirely by the desire to do the right thing."

On 11 December 2002, Monti proposed a series of reforms to the EU's merger rules and made structural changes within the Commission's Competition department, which aimed to improve transparency for companies throughout the merger review process. The reforms were adopted by the EU as Regulation 139/2004 (known as ECMR).

In 2004, Prime Minister Silvio Berlusconi returned to power in Italy and chose not to reappoint Monti to the Commission when his second term ended.

=== Barroso Commission ===
In 2010, Monti was asked by Commission President Manuel Barroso to draft a "Report on the Future of the Single Market" proposing further measures towards the completion of the EU's Single Market. The published report, adopted by the EU on 13 April 2011, proposed 12 reforms to the Single Market and was intended to "give new momentum" to the European economy.

== Prime Minister of Italy ==
=== Appointment ===
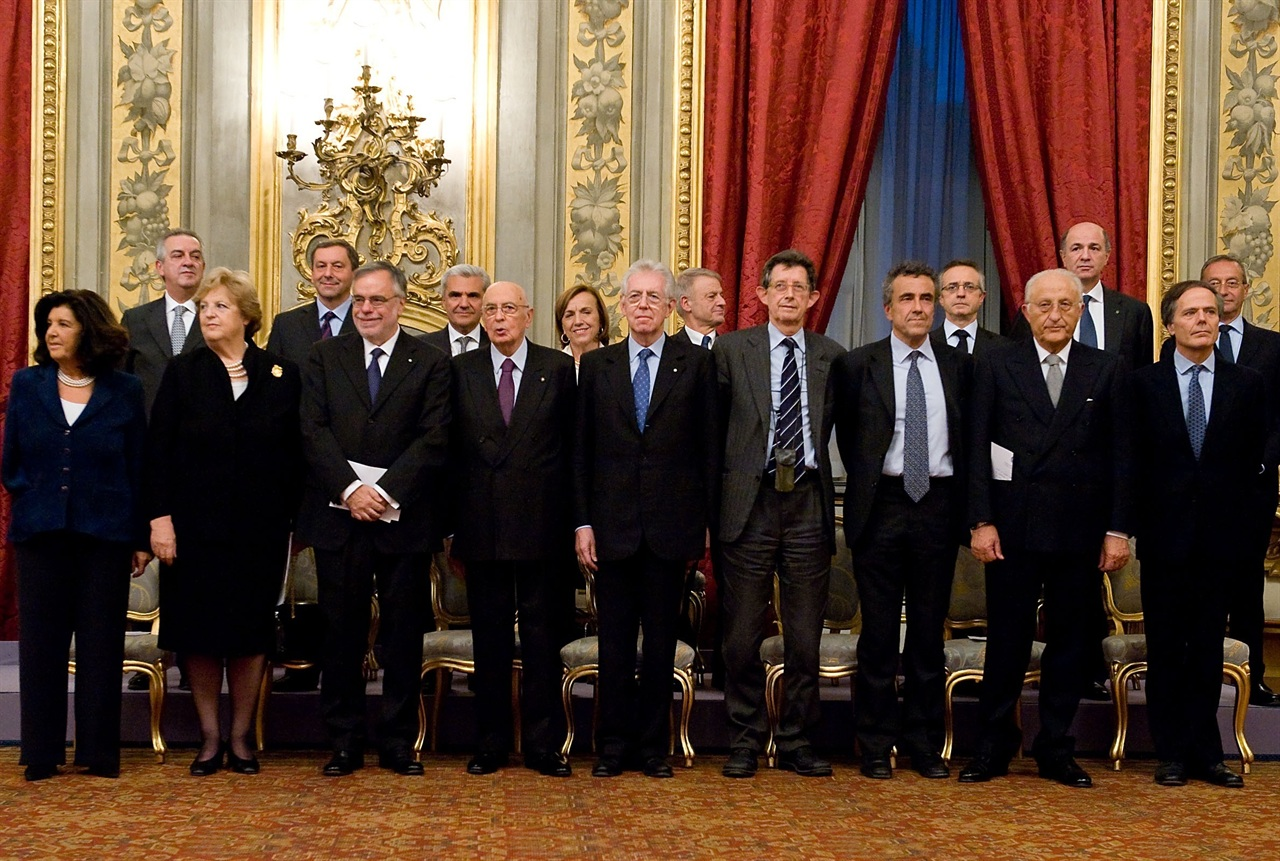
Monti's Cabinet swearing-in ceremony in the presence of President Napolitano.

On 9 November 2011, Monti was appointed a lifetime senator by Italian President Giorgio Napolitano. He was seen as a favourite to replace Silvio Berlusconi to lead a new unity government in Italy in order to implement reforms and austerity measures. On 12 November 2011, following Berlusconi's resignation, Napolitano invited Monti to form a new government. Monti accepted the offer, and held talks with the leaders of the main Italian political parties, declaring that he wanted to form a government that would remain in office until the next scheduled general elections in 2013. On 16 November 2011, Monti was sworn in as Prime Minister of Italy, after unveiling a technocratic cabinet composed entirely of unelected professionals. He also chose to hold the post of Minister of Economy and Finance. On 17 and 18 November 2011, the Italian Senate and Italian Chamber of Deputies both passed motions of confidence supporting Monti's government, with only Lega Nord voting against.

=== Austerity measures ===
On 4 December 2011, Monti's government introduced emergency austerity measures intended to stem the worsening economic conditions in Italy and restore market confidence, especially after rising Italian government bond yields began to threaten Italy's financial stability. The austerity package called for increased taxes, pension reform and measures to fight tax evasion. Monti also announced that he would be giving up his own salary as part of the reforms. On 16 December 2011, the Lower House of the Italian Parliament adopted the measures by a vote of 495 to 88. Six days later, the Upper House gave final approval to the package by a vote of 257 to 41.

=== Labour market reforms ===
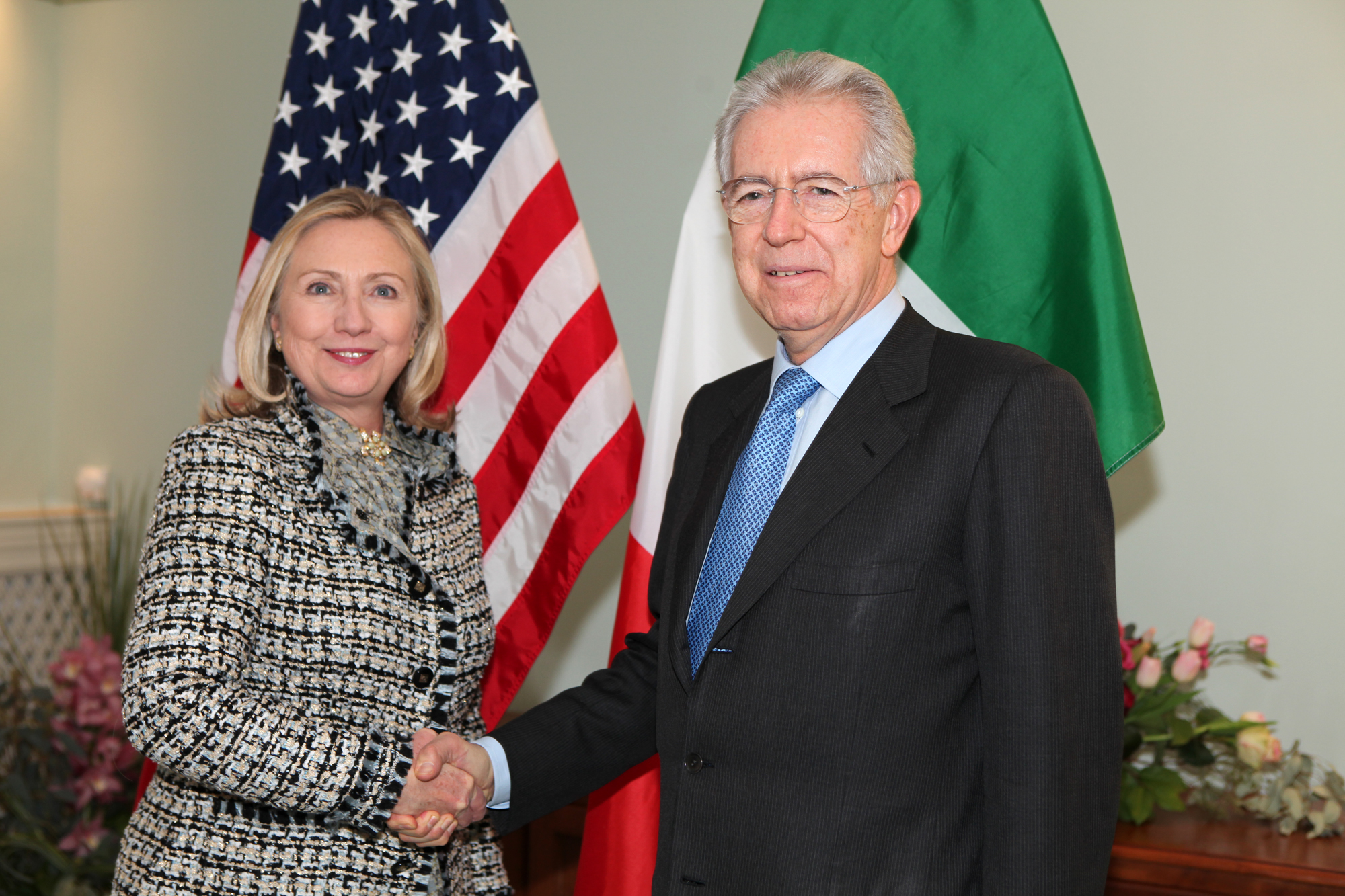
Prime Minister Monti with U.S. Secretary of State Hillary Clinton, 2012.

On 20 January 2012, Monti's government formally adopted a package of reforms targeting Italy's labour market. The reforms are intended to open certain professions (such as taxi drivers, pharmacists, doctors, lawyers and notaries) to more competition by reforming their licensing systems and abolishing minimum tariffs for their services. Article 18 of Italy's labour code, which requires companies that employ 15 or more workers to re-hire (rather than compensate) any employee found to have been fired without just cause, would also be reformed. The reforms to Article 18 are intended to make it easier for companies to dismiss or lay off employees, which would hopefully encourage companies to hire more employees on permanent rather than short-term renewable contracts. The proposals have been met with strong opposition from labour unions and public protests. In early January 2012, consultations between the government and labour unions commenced and on 13 February, it was reported in the Italian media that a compromise on the proposals was very close and the government was hopeful that reforms could be approved by the Italian parliament in March.

=== 2013 election ===
On 21 December 2012, Monti announced his resignation as prime minister, having made a public promise to step down on 8 December, after the passing of the 2013 Budget. He initially stated that he would only remain in office until an early election could be held. However, on 28 December, he announced that he would seek to remain prime minister by contesting the election, as the leader of a centrist coalition, the Civic Choice.

The election was held on 24 February 2013, and Monti's centrist coalition was only able to come fourth, with 10.5% of the vote. Monti remained prime minister until a coalition was formed on 28 April, led by Enrico Letta.

== Political career ==
=== Lifetime Senator ===
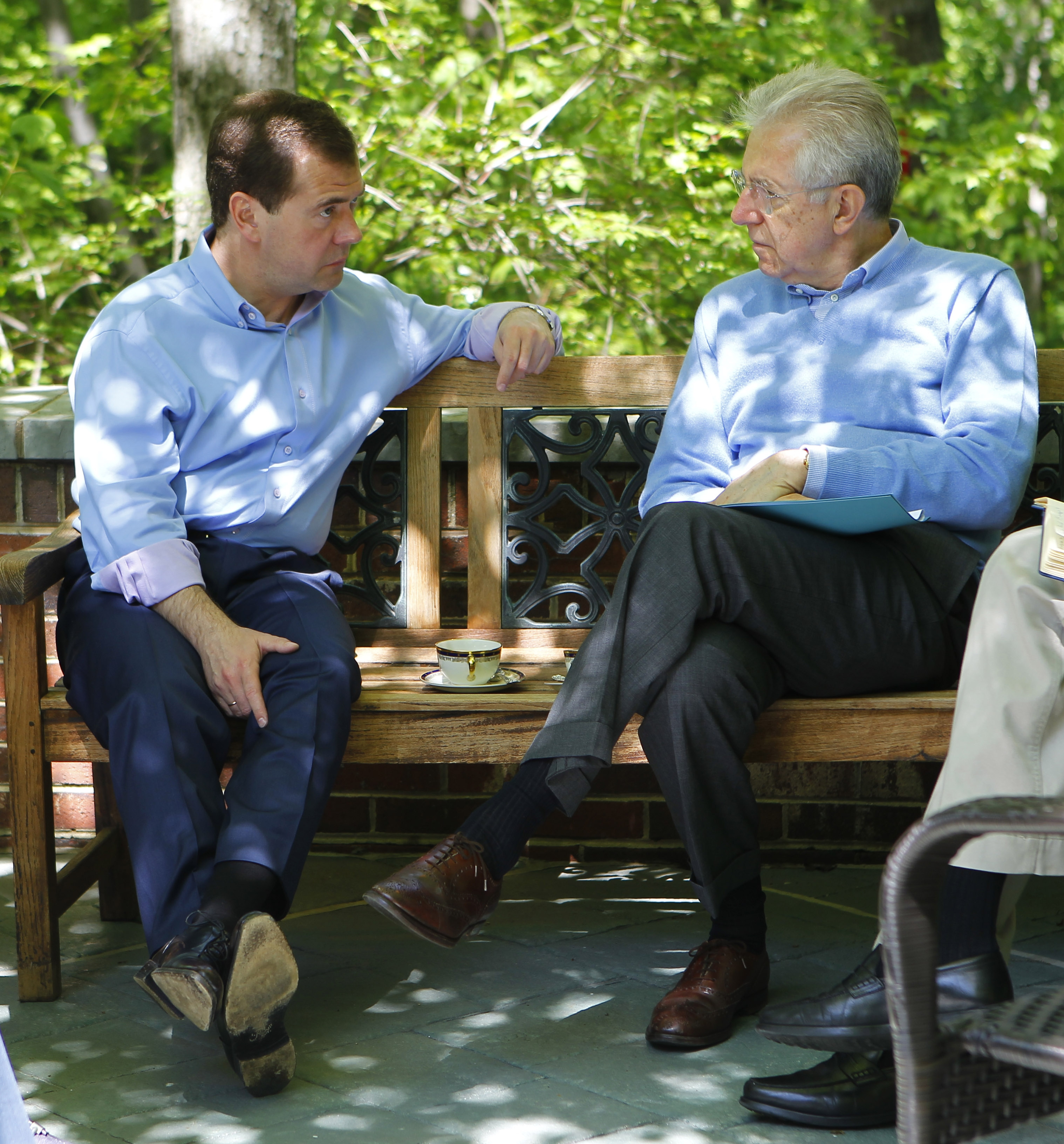
Mario Monti with Russian Prime Minister Dmitry Medvedev at the 38th G8 summit.

On 9 November 2011, Monti was appointed a Lifetime Senator by Italian President Giorgio Napolitano, in accordance with the second paragraph of "Article 59 of the Constitution, which merits national honour distinguished in science and society". He was a member of the Commission for Industry, Commerce and Tourism from 30 November 2011 to 14 March 2013 in the sixteenth legislature. Monti was a member of the independents' mixed parliamentary group until 19 March 2013, when he joined the Civic Choice (SC) parliamentary group, becoming the first lifetime senator aligned with a party group. On 7 May 2013, he became a member of the Commission for Foreign Affairs and Emigration.

=== President of Civic Choice ===
On 4 January 2013, Monti launched Civic Choice as an electoral list of civil society, to realize the implementation of his agenda in a future government. SC was announced as part of the With Monti for Italy (CMI) centrist coalition, alongside Union of the Centre (UdC) and Future and Freedom (FLI). In the 2013 general election, the party obtained 8.3% of the vote, 37 deputies (on its own lists) and 15 senators (within CMI). On 12 March 2013, Civic Choice was turned into a political party as Monti took office as acting SC president in the Provisional Committee of the party and appointed senator Andrea Olivero as provisional political coordinator. On 16 May 2013, Mario Monti was unanimously elected president of the Civic Choice.

On 17 October 2013, he resigned and was replaced by his deputy Alberto Bombassei as acting president. Monti cited his disagreement with 12 senators (out of 20), including Mario Mauro, Andrea Olivero, Gabriele Albertini, Pier Ferdinando Casini (UdC leader), Maria Paola Merloni, Luigi Marino and Lucio Romano. Particularly, Monti criticized Mauro's line of unconditioned support to the government and of transforming SC into a larger centre-right political party, open to The People of Freedom.

== Other activities ==
Monti actively participates in several major think tanks. He was the founding chairman of Bruegel, another European think tank, which was formed in 2005.

From 2005 to 2008, he was the first president of the Bruegel. Monti is also a leading member of the exclusive Bilderberg Group. He has also been an international advisor to Goldman Sachs and The Coca-Cola Company. In 2010, he became President of the Trilateral Commission.

In 2007, Monti was one of the first supporters of the first European civic forum, États Généraux de l'Europe, initiated by European think tank EuropaNova and European Movement. He was also a member of the French government's Attali Commission from 2007 to 2008, appointed by Nicolas Sarkozy to provide recommendations to enhance economic growth in France.

Monti is a founding member of the Spinelli Group, an organization launched in September 2010 to facilitate integration within the European Union (other members of the steering group include Jacques Delors, Daniel Cohn-Bendit, Guy Verhofstadt, Andrew Duff and Elmar Brok).

In January 2014, Monti became Chairman of the High Level Group on Own Resources, a consultative committee of the European Union aimed at proposing new forms of revenue for the European Union's budget. The final report of the group was adopted in December 2016 and published in January 2017. It argued for new tax sources, such as on carbon and fuel.

In 2019, Monti chaired a search committee which recommended to the European Commission the appointment of Mauro Ferrari as the next President of the European Research Council (ERC). In 2020, he was appointed by the World Health Organization's Regional Office for Europe to chair the Pan-European Commission on Health and Sustainable Development to make recommendations on investments and reforms to improve the resilience of health and social care systems.

Other activities include:

- Center for Economic and Policy Research (CEPR), Distinguished Fellow (since 2019)
- Centre for European Reform (CER), Member of the Advisory Board
- European Investment Bank (EIB), Member of the Appointment Advisory Committee
- Friends of Europe, Member of the Praesidium
- Moody's, Member of the Senior European Advisory Council
- Atlantic Council, Member of the Business and Economics Advisors Group
- Transparency International, Chairman of the European Advisory Board (since 2015)
- Trilateral Commission, European Chairman (-2011)

== Personal life ==
Since 1970, Monti has been married to Elsa Antonioli (born 1944), an Italian Red Cross volunteer, with whom he has two children, Federica and Giovanni.

Known for his reserved character, Monti acknowledges not being especially sociable. He said that his youth was given over to hard study; spare-time activities included cycling and keeping up with world affairs by tuning into foreign short-wave radio stations.

In addition to his native Italian, Monti also speaks English.

== Awards and decorations ==
=== National honours ===
- Italy:
  - Knight Grand Cross of the Order of Merit of the Italian Republic (29 November 2004)
  - Commander of the Order of Merit of the Italian Republic (27 December 1992)

=== Foreign honours ===
- Japan:
  - Grand Cordon of the Order of the Rising Sun (3 November 2015)

== See also ==
- List of prime ministers of Italy
- Monti Cabinet
- Monti's Agenda for Italy

Academic offices
Preceded by Luigi Guatri	Rector of Bocconi University; 1989–1994	Succeeded by Roberto Ruozi
Preceded by Giovanni Spadolini	President of Bocconi University; 1994–2022	Succeeded by Andrea Sironi
Political offices
Preceded by Raniero Vanni d'Archirafi	European Commissioner from Italy; 1995–2004; Served alongside: Emma Bonino, Romano Prodi	Succeeded by Franco Frattini
Preceded by Antonio Ruberti	European Commissioner from Italy; 1995–2004; Served alongside: Emma Bonino, Romano Prodi	Succeeded by Antonio Tajani
Preceded by Raniero Vanni d'Archirafi as European Commissioner for Internal Market and Services	European Commissioner for Internal Market, Services, Customs and Taxation; 1995–1999	Succeeded by Frits Bolkestein
Preceded by Christiane Scrivener as European Commissioner for Customs and Taxation	European Commissioner for Internal Market, Services, Customs and Taxation; 1995–1999	Succeeded by Frits Bolkestein
Preceded by Karel Van Miert	European Commissioner for Competition; 1999–2004	Succeeded by Neelie Kroes
Preceded by Silvio Berlusconi	Prime Minister of Italy; 2011–2013	Succeeded by Enrico Letta
Preceded by Giulio Tremonti	Minister of Economy and Finance; 2011–2012	Succeeded by Vittorio Grilli
Preceded by Giulio Terzi di Sant'Agata	Minister of Foreign Affairs; Acting; 2013	Succeeded by Emma Bonino
Party political offices
Preceded by Andrea Riccardi	President of Civic Choice; 2013	Succeeded by Alberto Bombassei; Acting
