= Giovanni Tria =

Italian politician (born 1948)

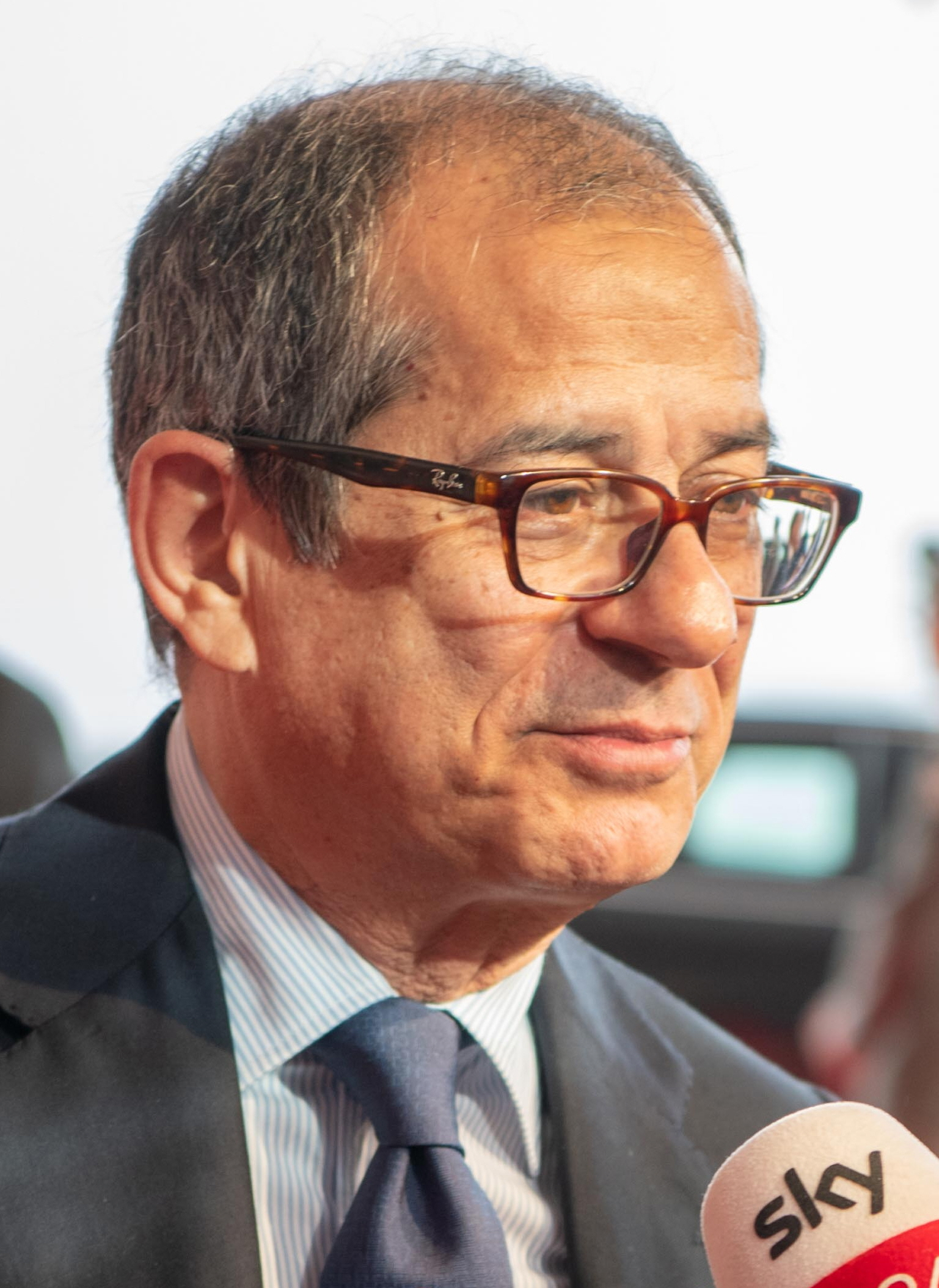

Minister of Economy and Finance
- In office 1 June 2018 – 5 September 2019
- Prime Minister: Giuseppe Conte
- Preceded by: Pier Carlo Padoan
- Succeeded by: Roberto Gualtieri

Personal details
- Born: 28 September 1948 (age 78) Rome, Italy
- Party: Independent of centre-right
- Education: Sapienza University

Giovanni Tria (born 28 September 1948) is an Italian economist and university professor who served as the Italian Minister of Economy and Finance in the Conte I Cabinet. He was Adviser of the Ministry of Economic Development (MED) from 9 March 2021 in the Draghi Cabinet.

== Early life and career ==
Giovanni Tria was born in Rome in 1948. He graduated in Law from the Sapienza University of Rome, where he then became Professor of Economics, Macroeconomics and the History of Economic Thought. During the same period he also taught at the University of Perugia. He is currently Professor of Political Economics at the University of Rome Tor Vergata, where he has been Dean in the Faculty of Economics since 2017.

Over the years he has served as a senior advisor in various ministries (Economics and Finance, Foreign Affairs, Public Administration, Labor). From 2002 to 2006 and from 2009 to 2012 he served as member of the board of directors of the International Labour Organization (ILO). From 1 January 2010 to 15 March 2016, he was President of the National School of Administration.

He collaborates with the newspaper Il Foglio and he is part of the scientific committee of the Magna Carta Foundation, a think tank whose orientation is inspired by the conservative liberalism of the Anglo-Saxon tradition.

== Political career ==
=== Minister of Finance ===
On 31 May 2018, Tria was selected as Minister of Economy and Finances in the government of Giuseppe Conte. At the time, he was drafted into the government as a last-minute replacement for Paolo Savona, who was vetoed by President Sergio Mattarella because of his criticism of the euro currency.

Early in his term, Tria committed to holding the national budget deficit below 2 percent of gross domestic product but eventually came under pressure from the coalition to set a target of 2.4 percent.

=== Ministerial adviser ===
On 8 March 2021 Giancarlo Giorgetti appointed Tria as his Adviser. Tria was sworn in on March 9, 2021.

== Other activities ==
=== European Union organizations ===
- European Investment Bank (EIB), Ex-Officio Member of the Board of Governors (2018–2020)
- European Stability Mechanism (ESM), Member of the Board of Governors (2018–2020)

=== International organizations ===
- African Development Bank (AfDB), Ex-Officio Member of the Board of Governors (2018–2020)
- Asian Infrastructure Investment Bank (AIIB), Ex-Officio Member of the Board of Governors (2018–2020)
- European Bank for Reconstruction and Development (EBRD), Ex-Officio Member of the Board of Governors (since 2018)
- International Monetary Fund (IMF), Ex-Officio Member of the Board of Governors (2018–20)
- Inter-American Investment Corporation (IIC), Ex-Officio Member of the Board of Governors (2018–2020)

Political offices
Preceded by Pier Carlo Padoan	Minister of Economy and Finance; 2018–2019	Succeeded by Roberto Gualtieri
