= Governor of the Bank of Italy =

Civil service post

- Governatore della Banca d'Italia
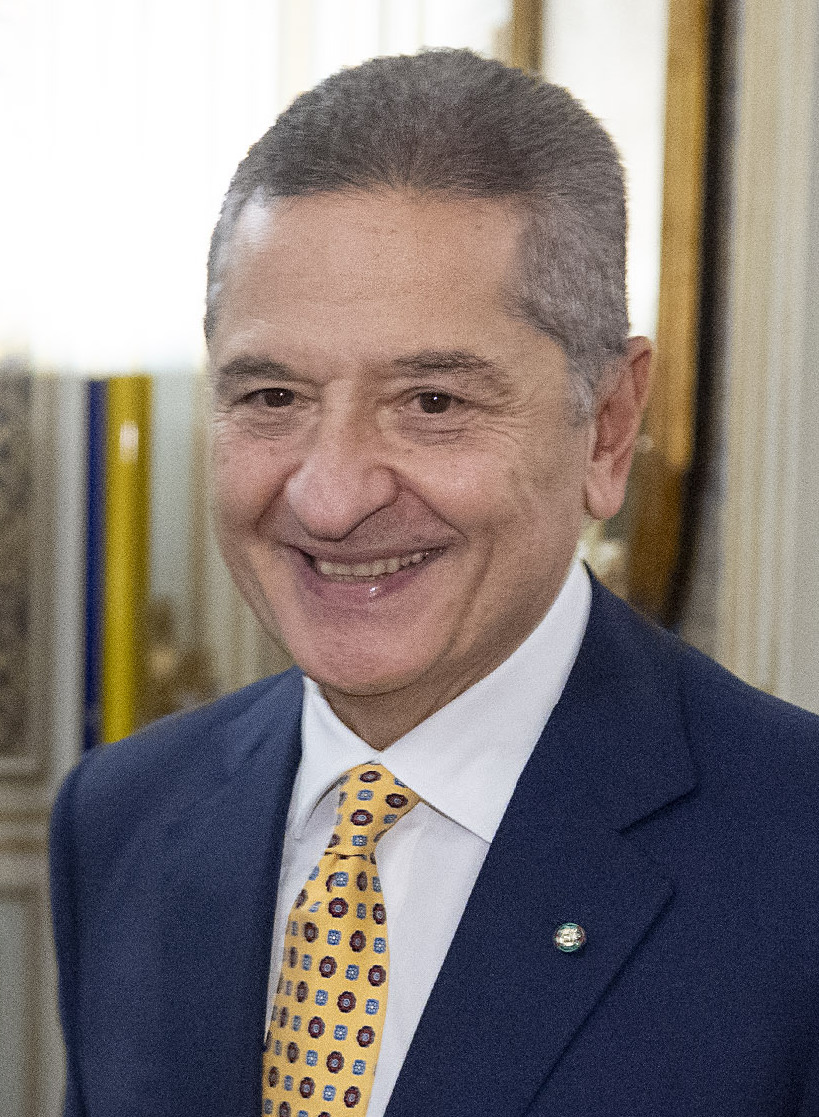
- Incumbent; Fabio Panetta since 1 November 2023
- Bank of Italy
- Seat: Palazzo Koch, Rome
- Appointer: President of Italy (since 1946) with the approval of the Council of Ministers
- Term length: 6 years
- Formation: 1928
- First holder: Bonaldo Stringher
- Deputy: Director General of the Bank of Italy
- Website: bancaditalia.it

The Governor of the Bank of Italy is the most senior position in the Bank of Italy. It is nominally a civil service post, but the appointment tends to be from within the bank, with the incumbent grooming their successor.

== List of Governors ==
N.	Portrait	Governor (Born–Died)	Took office	Left office	Ref
1		Bonaldo Stringher (1854–1930)	3 July 1928	24 December 1930	
1		Bonaldo Stringher (1854–1930)	2 years, 174 days		
2		Vincenzo Azzolini (1881–1967)	10 January 1931	4 June 1944	
2		Vincenzo Azzolini (1881–1967)	13 years, 146 days		
3		Luigi Einaudi (1874–1961)	5 January 1945	11 May 1948	
3		Luigi Einaudi (1874–1961)	3 years, 127 days		
4		Donato Menichella (1896–1984)	7 August 1948	17 August 1960	
4		Donato Menichella (1896–1984)	12 years, 10 days		
5		Guido Carli (1914–1993)	18 August 1960	18 August 1975	
5		Guido Carli (1914–1993)	15 years, 0 days		
6		Paolo Baffi (1911–1989)	19 August 1975	7 October 1979	
6		Paolo Baffi (1911–1989)	4 years, 49 days		
7		Carlo Azeglio Ciampi (1920–2016)	8 October 1979	29 April 1993	
7		Carlo Azeglio Ciampi (1920–2016)	13 years, 203 days		
8		Antonio Fazio (1936– )	4 May 1993	19 December 2005	
8		Antonio Fazio (1936– )	12 years, 229 days		
9		Mario Draghi (1947– )	16 January 2006	31 October 2011	
9		Mario Draghi (1947– )	5 years, 306 days		
10		Ignazio Visco (1949– )	1 November 2011	31 October 2023	
10		Ignazio Visco (1949– )	11 years, 364 days		
11		Fabio Panetta (1959– )	1 November 2023	Incumbent	
11		Fabio Panetta (1959– )	2 years, 310 days		
