= Pier Carlo Padoan =

Italian economist (born 1950)

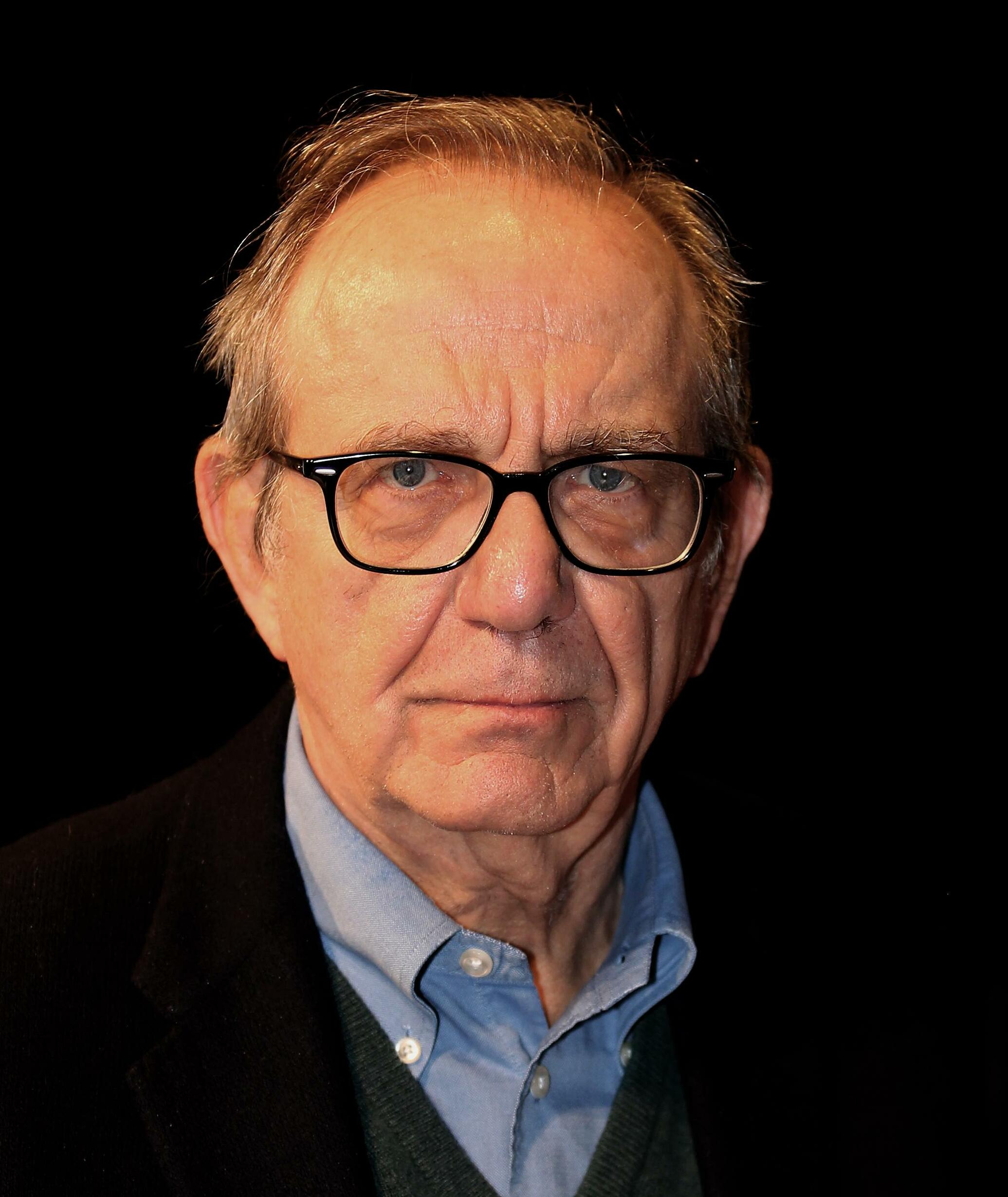

Minister of Economy and Finance
- In office 22 February 2014 – 1 June 2018
- Prime Minister: Matteo Renzi; Paolo Gentiloni
- Preceded by: Fabrizio Saccomanni
- Succeeded by: Giovanni Tria

Member of the Chamber of Deputies
- In office 23 March 2018 – 4 November 2020
- Constituency: Siena

Deputy Secretary-General of the Organisation for Economic Co-operation and Development
- In office 1 June 2007 – 22 February 2014
- Preceded by: Kiyotaka Akasaka
- Succeeded by: Mari Kiviniemi

Personal details
- Born: 19 January 1950 (age 76) Rome, Italy
- Party: Democratic Party
- Spouse: Maria Grazia Reitano
- Children: 2
- Education: Sapienza University

Pier Carlo Padoan (Italian: [ˈpjɛr ˈkarlo padoˈan, - ˈpaːdoan]; born 19 January 1950) is an Italian economist who served as Minister of Economy and Finance of Italy from 2014 to 2018. Since April 2021 he is Chairman of the Board of Directors of the Italian bank UniCredit.

Padoan was director of the International Monetary Fund for Italy from 2001 to 2005. On 1 June 2007, he became Deputy Secretary General of the Organisation for Economic Co-operation and Development (OECD).

== Early life ==
Padoan was born in Rome on 19 January 1950. In the 1970s, he graduated in economics at the La Sapienza University in Rome. During his years at the University, Padoan criticised in the magazine Marxist Critic the economic theories of John Maynard Keynes, being influenced by the ideas of the Polish economist Michał Kalecki.

== Academic career ==
Until 2007, he was Professor of Economics at the Sapienza University of Rome. From 1992 until 2001, he also was professor at the College of Europe, Bruges and Warsaw, and a visiting professor since 2001. He was also a visiting professor at Université Libre de Bruxelles, Belgium, University of Urbino, Italy, Universidad de la Plata, Argentina, and University of Tokyo, Japan. He has published in the field of European economics and political economy.

== Career in the public sector ==
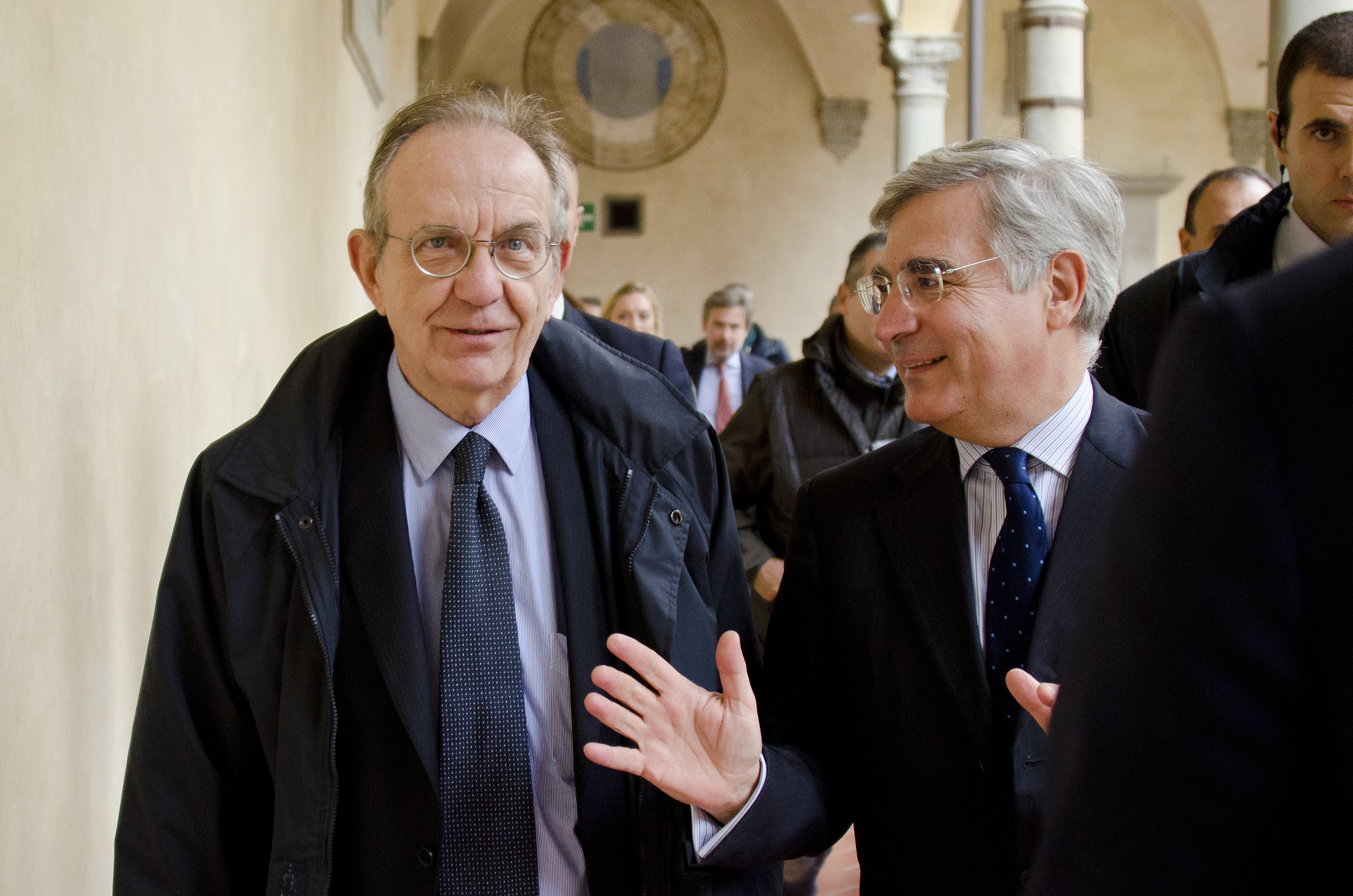
Pier Carlo Padoan in October 2016.

From 1998 until 2001, Padoan served as economic adviser to Italian Prime Ministers Massimo D'Alema and Giuliano Amato during EU budget negotiations like Agenda 2000, and the Lisbon Agenda, at summits of the European Council and the G8.

Padoan was an International Monetary Fund official from 2001 to 2005 as the Italian executive director and as board member in charge of European coordination. He is a consultant to the World Bank, European Commission and European Central Bank, where he has called for aggressive easing. During that period, he criticized budget cutbacks in the euro zone's weakest economies, struggling with debt, which he has called periphery countries.

Padoan served as deputy secretary general at the OECD in Paris between 2007 and 2014, taking on the additional role of the organisation's chief economist in 2009. He was the OECD's G20 Finance Deputy, leading the initiatives 'Strategic Response', 'Green Growth' and 'Innovation'.

== Political career ==
=== Minister of Finance, 2014–2018 ===
On 19 February 2014, Matteo Renzi chose Padon as Italy's new Minister of Economy and Finance. On 12 December 2016, when Renzi resigned as prime minister after the constitutional referendum, Padoan was confirmed again as finance minister by the new Prime Minister Paolo Gentiloni. In June 2016, he was also elected chairman of the Party of European Socialists' Finance Ministers Network.

Padoan often stated that the very tight fiscal rules which Europe currently has in place could be temporarily relaxed in order to make the necessary resources available to boost employment.

In a letter to the Juncker Commission's Economic and Financial Affairs, Taxation and Customs Pierre Moscovici in late 2014, Padoan and the finance ministers of the euro zone's other biggest economies – Michel Sapin of France and Wolfgang Schäuble of Germany – urged the European Commission to draw up EU-wide laws to curb corporate tax avoidance and prevent member states from offering lower taxes to attract investors, calling for a comprehensive anti-BEPS (Base Erosion and Profit Shifting) directive for member states to adopt by the end of 2015.

Also during his time in office, Padoan implemented the Italian government's 2015 plan to clean up over €200 billion in non-performing loans from the balance sheets of the country's banks. He also oversaw the 2017 bailout of Banca Monte dei Paschi di Siena, Veneto Banca, and Banca Popolare di Vicenza.

=== Member of Parliament, 2018–2020 ===
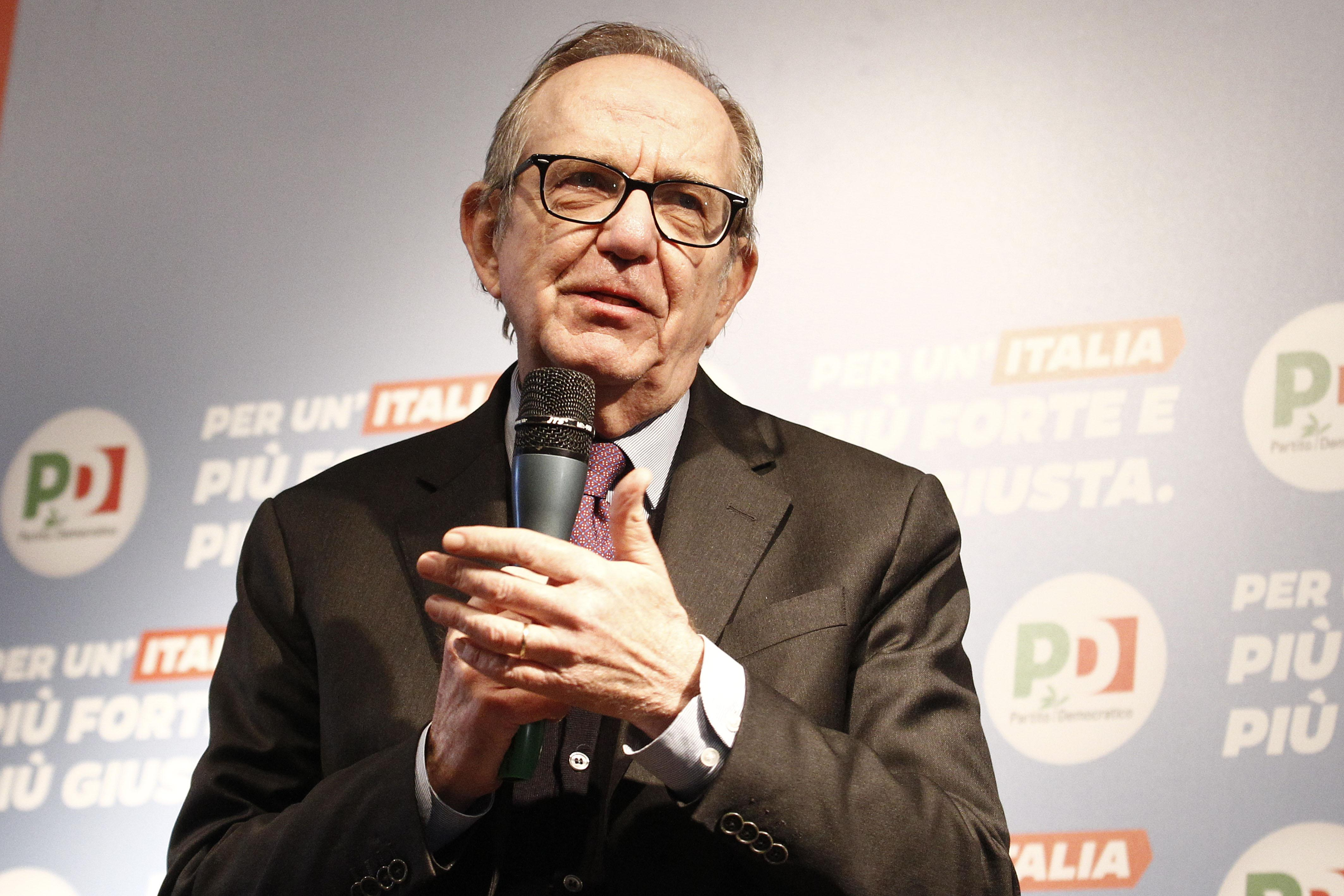
Pier Carlo Padoan during a PD rally in 2018.

Padoan joined the Democratic Party and ran in the 2018 Italian general election in March for the constituency of Siena, where he was elected, defeating the League economic advisor Claudio Borghi.

In 2020, the Conte II Cabinet of Prime Minister Giuseppe Conte nominated Padoan as Italy's candidate for the election of president of the European Bank for Reconstruction and Development; Padoan later pulled out of the race when Odile Renaud-Basso emerged as the front runner for the position.

== Electoral history ==
| Election | House | Constituency | Party | Votes | Result |
|---|---|---|---|---|---|
| 2018 | Chamber of Deputies | Arezzo–Siena | PD | 53,457 | Elected |

=== First-past-the-post elections ===
2018 Italian general election (C): Arezzo–Siena
| Candidate | Party | Votes | % |
|---|---|---|---|
| Pier Carlo Padoan | Centre-left coalition | 53,457 | 36.2 |
| Claudio Borghi | Centre-right coalition | 47,694 | 32.3 |
| Leonardo Franci | Five Star Movement | 33,092 | 22.4 |
| Others | | 13,515 | 9.1 |
| Total | | 147,758 | 100.0 |

== Other activities ==
=== Corporate boards ===
- UniCredit, Non-Executive Member of the Board of Directors (since 2020)

=== European Union organizations ===
- European Investment Bank (EIB), Ex-Officio Member of the Board of Governors (2014-2018)
- European Stability Mechanism (ESM), Member of the Board of Governors (2014-2018)

=== International organizations ===
- African Development Bank (AfDB), Ex-Officio Member of the Board of Governors (2014-2018)
- Asian Infrastructure Investment Bank (AIIB), Ex-Officio Member of the Board of Governors (2014-2018)
- European Bank for Reconstruction and Development (EBRD), Ex-Officio Member of the Board of Governors (2014-2018)
- International Monetary Fund (IMF), Ex-Officio Member of the Board of Governors (2014-2018)
- Inter-American Investment Corporation (IIC), Ex-Officio Member of the Board of Governors (2014-2018)

=== Non-profit organizations ===
- Scope Foundation, Member of the Honorary Board (since 2020)
- Fondazione Italianieuropei, Director
- Istituto Affari Internazionali (IAI), Vice President of the Board

== Publications ==
Padoan edited or authored 14 books and papers, from 1986 until 2010, with titles in English as follows:

- Innovation and Growth: Chasing a Moving Frontier by Vandana Chandra, Deniz Eröcal, Pier Carlo Padoan and Carlos A. Primo Braga. OECD, World Bank 2010.
- The Marshall Plan: Lessons Learned for the 21st Century, edited by Eliot Sorel and Pier Carlo Padoan. OECD 2008.
- Euro-American Trade and Financial Alliances, 2005 book, editor
- The Structural Foundations of International Finance, 2003 book, editor "advocates entrepreneurial co-ordination by productive enterprises"
- A Transatlantic Perspective on the Euro, 2000 paperback, editor euro as potential global currency
- Monetary Union, Employment and Growth: The Impact of the Euro as a Global Currency, edited by Pier Carlo Padoan. Edward Elgar Publishing 2001.
- Technology accumulation and diffusion: is there a regional dimension? by Pier Carlo Padoan, World Bank Publications. 1997 (36-page working paper)
- Trade and the accumulation and diffusion of knowledge, by Pier Carlo Padoan, World Bank Publications. 1996 (47-page working paper)
- Europe between East and South by Siro Lombardini and Pier Carlo Padoan. 1994
- Political Economy of European Integration: Markets and Institutions by Paolo Guerrieri and Pier Carlo Padoan. 1989
- Political Economy of International Co-Operation by Pier Carlo Padoan and Paolo Guerreri. 1988 ISBN 978-0-7099-1344-3.
- The Political Economy of International Financial Instability by Pier Carlo Padoan. 1986

== See also ==
- Organisation for Economic Co-operation and Development

Political offices
| Preceded by Fabrizio Saccomanni | Minister of Economy and Finance; 2014–2018 | Succeeded by Giovanni Tria |
