= Salvatore Rossi =

Italian economist (born 1949)

Salvatore Rossi OMRI
- Incumbent
- Assumed office 10 May 2013
- Preceded by: Fabrizio Saccomanni
- In office 17 January 2012 – 9 May 2013

Personal details
- Born: 6 January 1949 (age 77) Bari, Italy
- Education: University of Bari
- Profession: Economist

Salvatore Rossi OMRI (born January 6, 1949) is an Italian economist and civil servant who serves as the director of the Bank of Italy since May 2013. Prior to his position, he served in several financial and economic institutions in Italy, including as chair of the board of directors of Telecom Italia from October 2019 to April 2024.

== Career ==
Rossi began his career at the Bank of Italy in 1976. He held various positions, including head of the Economic Research Department in 2000. Between 2007 and 2011, he served as the chief economist in the economic research and international relations area. In 2011, he was appointed secretary general and advisor to the governing board, where he focused on economic policy matters.

From January 2012 to May 2013, Rossi served as deputy governor and a member of the governing board of the Bank of Italy. Between May 2013 and May 2019, he held the position of senior deputy governor of the Bank of Italy and also served as president of the Italian Institute for the Supervision of Insurance.

Rossi has participated in academic activities, teaching courses and leading seminars at the University of Rome Tor Vergata and the University of Bari. From January 2013 to February 2016, he was a member of the Fondo Strategico Italiano and is currently a senior fellow at the LUISS School of European Political Economy.

Between May 2012 and March 2019, Rossi was a member of the foundation board of the International Centre for Monetary and Banking Studies in Geneva. He is also a member of the board of governors of Fondazione Giovanni Agnelli and serves on the board of the Einaudi Institute for Economics and Finance (EIEF).

In March 2019, Rossi resigned from the Bank of Italy, where he had been second-in-command to Governor Ignazio Visco. His resignation occurred amid political pressure for leadership changes at the central bank. He was succeeded by Fabio Panetta.

In March 2013, the then-president of Italy, Giorgio Napolitano, included Rossi in a group of ten advisors tasked with drafting a policy platform for a new Italian government.

Rossi was appointed as chairman of Telecom Italia (TIM) in October 2019. In December 2023, Rossi announced he would not seek reappointment as chairman of TIM's board when his term concluded in April 2024. This decision coincided with internal disagreements, particularly with TIM's largest shareholder, Vivendi.

== Works ==
Salvatore Rossi has written on topics such as international economics, economic policy, and industrial economics. His published works include:

- Competere in Europa (ed.), Il Mulino, Bologna, 1993
- La bilancia dei pagamenti: i conti con l'estero dell'Italia, la lira, i problemi dell'unione monetaria europea, with R.S. Masera, CEDAM, Padua, 1993
- La politica economica italiana 1968-1998, Laterza, Rome-Bari 1998, revised editions 2000, 2003, 2007
- La nuova economia: i fatti dietro il mito (ed.), Il Mulino, Bologna, 2003
- La regina e il cavallo. Quattro mosse contro il declino, Laterza, Rome–Bari, 2006
- Controtempo. L'Italia nella crisi mondiale, Laterza, Rome–Bari, 2009
- Processo alla finanza, Laterza, Rome-Bari, 2013
- Che cosa sa fare l'Italia, with Anna Giunta, Laterza, Rome-Bari, 2017
- Oro, Il Mulino, Bologna, 2018

== Awards and honours ==
Knight of the Order of Merit of the Italian Republic - awarded on 27 December 1995
Officer of the Order of Merit of the Italian Republic - awarded on 27 December 2005
Grand Officer of the Order of Merit of the Italian Republic - awarded on 30 December 2013
