= Marcello De Cecco =

Italian economist (1939–2016)

- Born: 17 September 1939; Lanciano, Italy
- Died: 3 March 2016 (aged 76); Rome, Italy
- Occupation: Economist

Marcello De Cecco (17 September 1939 – 3 March 2016) was an Italian economist.

Born in Lanciano, De Cecco graduated in Law from Parma University before studying Economics at both Johns Hopkins University in Bologna and Pembroke College, Cambridge, where he graduated with a BA and PhD. He was a professor at several universities, including the Scuola Normale Superiore di Pisa and the LUISS University of Rome.

De Cecco's studies mainly focused on the history of monetary and financial policies and on theories of the genesis and functioning of markets. Sympathetic to Keynesian economic theory, he was increasingly concerned with the politics and economics of the European Union, strongly opposing European austerity politics.

De Cecco collaborated with several financial institutions, including the International Monetary Fund, Banca d'Italia and Banca Nazionale del Lavoro. In 2007 he was part of the Organizing Committee of the Democratic Party.
