= Ignazio Visco =

Italian economist (born 1949)

Ignazio Visco OMRI
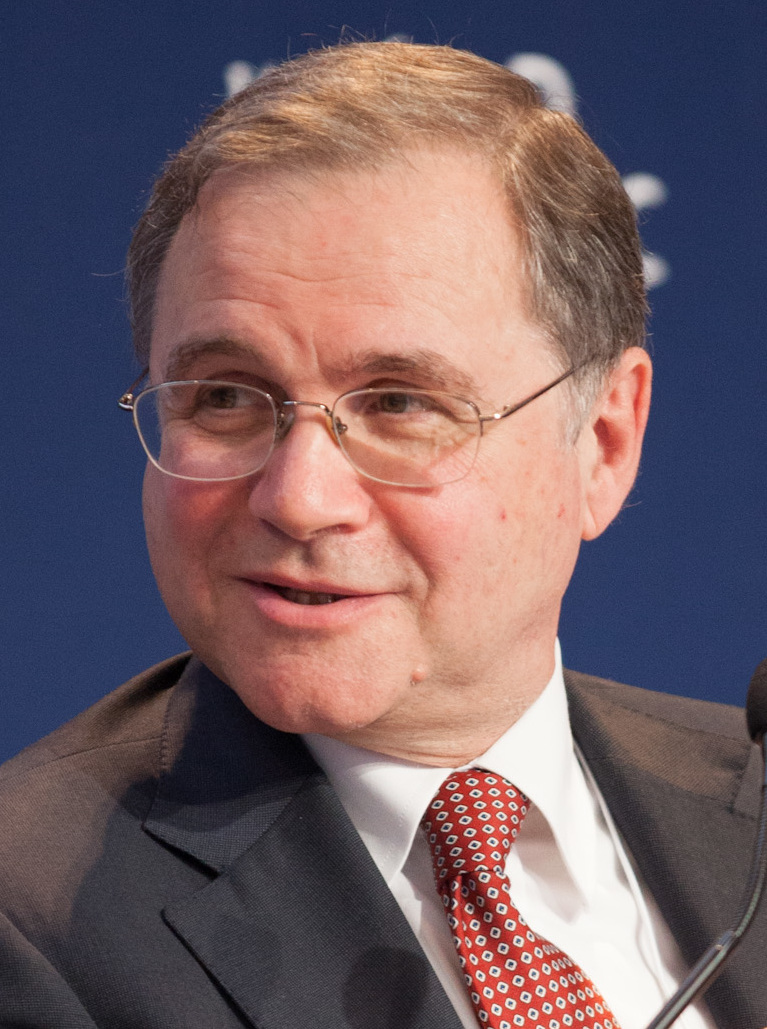

Governor of the Bank of Italy
- In office 1 November 2011 – 31 October 2023
- Preceded by: Mario Draghi
- Succeeded by: Fabio Panetta

Deputy Director General of the Bank of Italy
- In office 9 January 2007 – 1 November 2011
- Governor: Mario Draghi
- Preceded by: Pierluigi Ciocca
- Succeeded by: Salvatore Rossi

Personal details
- Born: 21 November 1949 (age 76) Naples, Italy
- Education: Sapienza University; University of Pennsylvania

Ignazio Visco OMRI (Italian pronunciation: [iɲˈɲattsjo ˈvisko]; born 21 November 1949) is an Italian economist and central banker and Governor of the Bank of Italy from 2011 to 2023.

== Early life and education ==
Visco was born in Naples on 21 November 1949. He obtained a summa cum laude degree in economics from the Sapienza University of Rome in 1971 with Federico Caffè as supervisor and continued his studies at the University of Pennsylvania (Economics Department), where he obtained an MA in 1974 and a PhD in Economics in 1981.

== Career ==
In 1972, Visco began his career at the Bank of Italy and in 1990 he was named head of the research department; from 1997 to 2002 he was chief economist of the Organisation for Economic Co-operation and Development (OECD) and on 9 January 2007 he was named deputy director-general of the Bank of Italy (alongside Giovanni Carosio) and a member of its Direttorio (Board of Directors).

On 24 October 2011, Visco was named to succeed Mario Draghi as governor of the Bank of Italy by Italian President Giorgio Napolitano.

From 2013 to 2023, while he was governor, Visco chaired the integrated directorate of the Italian Insurance Supervisory Authority (IVASS).

On 28 January 2015, Visco was placed under investigation by the Prosecutor of Spoleto as part a probe into the special administration of Banca Popolare di Spoleto. In September 2016, the case was definitively dropped by a judge, upholding the prosecutor's request.

During his time in office, Visco came under fire for failing to effectively tackle Italy's banking woes. In October 2017, the country's ruling centre-left Democratic Party submitted a motion in Parliament calling for new leadership at the Bank of Italy, casting doubt on Visco's chances of being reappointed to a second term. Following a proposal made by Prime Minister Paolo Gentiloni and his cabinet to renominate Visco and the endorsement of the Bank of Italy's high council, President Sergio Mattarella signed a decree to reappoint Visco for a second six-year term.

== Other activities ==
=== European Union institutions ===
- European Systemic Risk Board (ESRB), Ex-Officio Member

=== International organizations ===
- Asian Development Bank, ex-officio member of the Board of Governors
- Bank for International Settlements, ex-officio member of the Board of Directors
- Financial Stability Board, ex-officio member of the steering committee
- Inter-American Development Bank, alternate member of the Board of Governors
- International Monetary Fund (IMF), alternate member of the Board of Governors
- American Economic Association, member
- Joint World Bank-IMF Development Committee, member
- World Bank, ex-officio member of the Board of Governors

=== Non-profit organizations ===
- Osservatorio Permanente Giovani-Editori, Member of the International Advisory Board

== Works ==
- Price Expectations in Rising Inflation, North Holland, 1984. ISBN 978-0-444-86836-7.
- Le aspettative nell'analisi economica, Il Mulino, 1985
- Inflazione, concorrenza e sviluppo (with Stefano Micossi), Il Mulino, 1993. ISBN 978-88-15-03866-1.
- Saving and the Accumulation of Wealth (with Albert Ando and Luigi Guiso), Cambridge University Press, 1994
- L'economia italiana (with Federico L. Signorini), Il Mulino, 2002
- Ageing and Pension System Reform (as Chairman of the G-10 Working Group), 2005 (PDF)
- Investire in conoscenza, Il Mulino, 2009

== Awards and honors ==
Knight of the Order of Merit of the Italian Republic – awarded on 2 June 1991
Officer of the Order of Merit of the Italian Republic – awarded on 27 December 1993
Commander of the Order of Merit of the Italian Republic – awarded on 2 June 2002
Grand Officer of the Order of Merit of the Italian Republic – awarded on 2 June 2007
Knight Grand Cross of the Order of Merit of the Italian Republic – awarded on 25 October 2011

== See also ==
- Governor of the Bank of Italy

Government offices
Preceded by Pierluigi Ciocca	Deputy Director General of the Bank of Italy; 2007–2011	Succeeded by Salvatore Rossi
Preceded by Mario Draghi	Governor of the Bank of Italy; 2011–2023	Succeeded by Fabio Panetta
