= List of Forza Italia leading members by political origin =

This is a list of various exponents of Forza Italia (1994) (current and former deputies, senators, ministers, MEPs, regional presidents, leading regional-level politicians, mayors of big and medium-sized cities and important members of party's national organs), divided by political origin (that is to say, of what party they were members or supporters shortly before the 1992-93 crisis and realignment of the political system, and of the foundation of Forza Italia in 1994).

The list shows well the political heterogeneity of members of Forza Italia.

== Ex-Christian Democrats ==
=== A ===
- Giancarlo Abelli
- Antonio Agogliati
- Pietro Aiello
- Angelino Alfano
- Gioacchino Alfano
- Alfredo Antoniozzi
- Sabatino Aracu
- Gianantonio Arnoldi
- Franco Asciutti
- Paolo Avezzù
- Claudio Azzolini
- Antonio Azzollini
- Antonio María Barbieri

=== B ===
- Vincenzo Barba
- Paolo Barelli
- Paolo Bartolozzi
- Raffaele Bazzoni
- Maurizio Bernardo
- Maurizio Bertucci
- Gianpaolo Bettamio
- Laura Bianconi
- Massimo Blasoni
- Guido Boscagli
- Gabriele Boscetto
- Aldo Brancher
- Donato Bruno
- Maria Burani

=== C ===
- Battista Caligiuri
- Diego Cammarata
- Cesare Campa
- Giuseppe Castiglione
- Ugo Cavallera
- Francesco Chirilli
- Marco Cicala
- Angelo Maria Cicolani
- Salvatore Cicu
- Michele Cimino
- Manlio Collavini
- Giuseppe Cossiga
- Rosario Giorgio Costa
- Mariangela Cotto
- Rocco Crimi
- Guido Crosetto

=== D ===
- Barbara Degani
- Walter De Rigo
- Giovanni Deodato
- Luigi Di Bartolomeo
- Manuela Di Centa
- Maurizio Dinelli
- Ida D'Ippolito
- Domenico Di Virgilio

=== F ===
- Luigi Fabbri
- Giuseppe Fallica
- Giuseppe Massimo Ferro
- Giuseppe Fini
- Giuseppe Firrarello
- Raffaele Fitto
- Giuliana Fontanella
- Roberto Formigoni
- Gianstefano Frigerio
- Stefania Fuscagni

=== G ===
- Fabio Garagnani
- Elisabetta Gardini
- Giuseppe Gargani
- Fabio Gava
- Basilio Germanà
- Mariastella Gelmini
- Antonio Girfatti
- Francesco Giro
- Pasquale Giuliano
- Isidoro Gottardo
- Luigi Grillo
- Vittorio Guasti
- Furio Gubetti

=== I ===
- Maria Claudia Ioannucci
- Michele Iorio
- Cosimo Izzo

=== L ===
- Enrico La Loggia
- Giorgio La Spisa
- Cosimo Latronico
- Luigi Lazzari
- Ivano Leccisi
- Giampiero Leo
- Gianni Letta
- Simonetta Licastro Scardino
- Maurizio Lupi

=== M ===
- Francesco Maione
- Luigi Manfredi
- Mario Mantovani
- Renzo Marangon
- Salvatore Marano
- Giuseppe Marinello
- Bruno Marini
- Antonio Martusciello
- Giovanni Marras
- Antonio Marzano
- Mario Masini
- Giovanni Mauro
- Mario Mauro
- Guido Milanese
- Filippo Misuraca
- Salvatore Misuraca
- Fabio Minoli Rota
- Gabriella Mondello
- Danilo Moretti
- Nino Mormino

=== N ===
- Osvaldo Napoli
- Benedetto Nicotra
- Giuseppe Nocco

=== P ===
- Leonardo Padrin
- Alessandro Pagano
- Rocco Palese
- Antonio Palmieri
- Maurizio Paniz
- Eolo Giovanni Parodi
- Adriano Paroli
- Renzo Patria
- Paola Pelino
- Italico Perlini
- Margherita Peroni
- Aldo Perrotta
- Maria Gabriella Pinto
- Giuseppe Pisanu
- Giancarlo Pittelli
- Piero Pizzi
- Angelo Pollina
- Egidio Ponzo

=== R ===
- Marcello Raimondi
- Nicolò Rassù
- Paolo Ricciotti
- Paolo Ricciuti
- Marcello Rollo
- Massimo Romagnoli
- Giuseppe Romele
- Luciano Rossi
- Roberto Rosso
- Gianni Rossoni
- Clodovaldo Ruffato
- Antonio Russo

=== S ===
- Mario Sala
- Stanislao Sambin
- Giacomo Santini
- Angelo Santori
- Michele Saponara
- Claudio Scajola
- Gianluigi Scaltritti
- Renato Schifani
- Gustavo Selva
- Remo Sernagiotto
- Grazia Sestini
- Giorgio Simeoni
- Ada Spadoni Urbani
- Francesco Stagno D'Alcontres
- Francesco Stradella

=== T ===
- Lucio Tarquinio
- Carlo Alberto Tesserin
- Piero Testoni

=== U ===
- Paolo Uggè

=== V ===
- Paolo Valentini Puccitelli
- Riccardo Ventre
- Giacomo Ventura
- Marcello Vernola
- Antonio Verro
- Guido Viceconte
- Gesuele Vilasi
- Luigi Villani
- Alfredo Vito

=== Z ===
- Francesco Zama
- Valter Zanetta
- Guido Ziccone
- Marino Zorzato
- Sante Zuffada
- Michele Zuin

== Ex-Socialists ==
(factions: We Blue Reformers, Free Foundation and Young Italy)

=== A ===
- Valentina Aprea
- Roberto Antonione

=== B ===
- Gianni Baget Bozzo
- Simone Baldelli
- Monica Stefania Baldi
- Massimo Baldini
- Paolo Bonaiuti
- Anna Cinzia Bonfrisco
- Margherita Boniver
- Renato Brunetta
- Francesco Brusco
- Giulio Camber

=== C ===
- Giampiero Cantoni
- Luigi Cesaro
- Enrico Cesaroni
- Renato Chisso
- Fabrizio Cicchitto
- Alessandro Colucci
- Francesco Colucci
- Domenico Contestabile
- Stefania Craxi

=== D ===
- Giulio Di Donato

=== F ===
- Gaetano Fasolino
- Giuliano Ferrara
- Franco Frattini

=== G ===
- Giorgio Galvagno
- Antonio Gentile
- Giuseppe Gentile
- Antonio Guidi
- Paolo Guzzanti

=== L ===
- Vanni Lenna
- Innocenzo Leontini
- Claudia Lombardo

=== I ===
- Raffaele Iannuzzi

=== M ===
- Rinaldo Magnani
- Alberto Magnolfi
- Chiara Moroni
- Francesco Musotto

=== N ===
- Emiddio Novi

=== O ===
- Renata Olivieri

=== P ===
- Gaetano Pecorella
- Mario Pepe
- Marcello Pera
- Mauro Pili
- Stefano Pillitteri
- Sergio Pizzolante

=== R ===
- Ettore Romoli

=== S ===
- Maurizio Sacconi
- Jole Santelli
- Amalia Sartori
- Umberto Scapagnini
- Aldo Scarabosio
- Giancarlo Serafini
- Giorgio Stracquadanio

=== T ===
- Carlo Taormina
- Renzo Tondo
- Giulio Tremonti

== Ex-Liberals ==
(faction: Popular Liberalism)

=== A ===
- Maria Elisabetta Alberti Casellati
- Maria Teresa Armosino

=== B ===
- Isabella Bertolini
- Alfredo Biondi

=== C ===
- Roberto Cassinelli
- Enrico Costa
- Raffaele Costa

=== F ===
- Gregorio Fontana
- Pieralfonso Fratta Pasini

=== G ===
- Giancarlo Galan
- Fabio Gava
- Antonio Gazzarra
- Niccolò Ghedini

=== L ===
- Carlo Laurora

=== M ===
- Antonio Martino
- Lorena Milanato
- Enrico Musso

=== N ===
- Enrico Nan
- Raffaele Nervi

=== O ===
- Andrea Orsini

=== P ===
- Alberto Pasquali
- Andrea Pastore
- Saverio Porcari
- Cesare Previti

=== R ===
- Laura Ravetto
- Dario Rivolta
- Paolo Romani

=== S ===
- Carlo Saffioti
- Paolo Scarpa Bonazza Buora
- Egidio Sterpa

=== U ===
- Giuliano Urbani

=== V ===
- Giuseppe Vegas

=== Z ===
- Pierantonio Zanettin
- Tiziano Zigiotto

== Ex-Republicans ==
- Pietro Paolo Amato
- Luigi Casero
- Guglielmo Castagnetti
- Simeone Di Cagno Abbrescia
- Jas Gawronski
- Salvatore Fleres
- Piergiorgio Massidda
- Antonio Nervegna
- Alessandro Nicolò
- Mario Pescante
- Gilberto Pichetto Fratin
- Denis Verdini
- Alberto Zorzoli

== Ex-Social Democrats ==
(faction: Clubs of Reformist Initiative)

- Nicola Cosentino
- Massimo Guarischi
- Carmelo Morra
- Henry Richard Rizzi
- Ermanno Russo
- Paolo Russo
- Simona Vicari
- Carlo Vizzini

== Ex-Radicals ==
(micro-party: Liberal Reformers)

- Benedetto Della Vedova
- Giuseppe Calderisi
- Gaetano Quagliariello
- Marcello Pera
- Francesca Scopelliti
- Marco Taradash
- Massimo Teodori
- Elio Vito

== Ex-Communists ==
- Sandro Bondi
- Giampietro Borghini
- Massimo Ferlini
- Lodovico Festa
- Renzo Foa
- Antonella Maiolo
- Tiziana Maiolo

== Ex-Demo-Proletarians and other extreme-leftists ==
- Massimo Caprara
- Gianfranco Miccichè

== Ex-Leghisti ==
- Roberto Asquini
- Alberto Cirio
- Mauro Delladio
- Albertino Gabana
- Daniele Galli
- Furio Gubetti
- Enrico Hüllweck
- Lucio Malan
- Marco Pottino
- Enrico Tibaldi

== Ex-Missini ==
- Michaela Biancofiore
- Mara Carfagna
- Ugo Gianfranco Grimaldi
- Massimo Mantovani
- Domenico Mennitti

== Ex-Monarchists ==
- Antonio Tajani

== Unknown previous allegiance ==
- Gabriele Albertini
- Alessandro Antichi
- Giacomo Baiamonte
- Massimo Maria Berruti
- Mariella Bocciardo
- Gabriella Carlucci
- Valerio Carrara
- Francesco Casoli
- Fiorella Ceccacci
- Annamaria Celesti
- Roberto Centaro
- Remigio Ceroni
- Ombretta Colli
- Gianfranco Conte
- Romano Comincioli
- Antonio D'Alì
- Giovanni Dell'Elce
- Marcello Dell'Utri
- Claudio Fazzone
- Luigi Fedele
- Mario Francesco Ferrara
- Salvatore Ferrigno
- Ilario Floresta
- Pietro Franzoso
- Enzo Ghigo
- Sestino Giacomoni
- Gaspare Giudice
- Antonello Iannarilli
- Giorgio Jannone
- Giorgio Lainati
- Giancarlo Laurini
- Antonio Leone
- Antonio Lorusso
- Pietro Lunardi
- Franco Malvano
- Paolo Marcheschi
- Giulio Marini
- Salvatore Mazzaracchio
- Giustina Mistrello Destro
- Pasquale Nessa
- Nitto Francesco Palma
- Giuseppe Palumbo
- Patrizia Paoletti Tangheroni
- Enrico Pianetta
- Guglielmo Picchi
- Lorenzo Piccioni
- Filippo Piccone
- Guido Podestà
- Guido Possa
- Stefania Prestigiacomo
- Antonella Rebuzzi
- Fedele Sanciu
- Luigi Scotti
- Lucio Stanca
- Vincenzo Taddei
- Antonio Tomassini
- Roberto Tortoli
- Mario Valducci
- Valentino Valentini
- Cosimo Ventucci
- Luigi Vitali
- Stefano Zappalà
