= Countercurrent (Italy, 2011) =

Countercurrent (Controcorrente) was a liberal association connected to The People of Freedom (PdL), a political party in Italy.

The association was launched in 2011 by some 30 liberals who opposed Giulio Tremonti's policies as economy minister. They included Guido Crosetto, Antonio Martino, Giorgio Stracquadanio, Guido Crosetto, Isabella Bertolini, Giuseppe Cossiga and Giuseppe Moles. Some of them were also members of Christopher Columbus Foundation (Martino), while others were considered Silvio Berlusconi's loyalists (Stracquadanio).

More specifically, members of Countercurrent were committed liberals who were uncomfortable with Tremonti's policies (dirigist, in their view) and wanted a return to Forza Italia's early libertarianism and to the so-called "spirit of 1994", the year of Berlusconi's entry to politics.

Somewhat surprisingly, on 3 November 2011, Stracquadanio and Bertolini signed an open letter to Berlusconi along with four recent splinters from the party (Roberto Antonione, Giustina Destro, Fabio Gava and Giancarlo Pittelli) in which they asked Berlusconi to step down and made a call for a new executive.

In July 2012 Martino, Moles, Deborah Bergamini, Enrico La Loggia and Gennario Malgieri criticized the PdL's support of Monti Cabinet, which had succeeded to Berlusconi's government in November 2011, while Straquadanio left the party altogether. In September Tremonti left the PdL and Martino returned into Berlusconi's inner circle. In December Crosetto and Cossiga left the PdL and joined Brothers of Italy (FdI). Both the PdL and FdI stopped supporting Monti's government.
