= Pisaniani =

Faction of The People of Freedom Italian political party

Pisaniani referred to the faction around Giuseppe Pisanu, a leading member of The People of Freedom (PdL), a political party in Italy.

Formerly a left-wing Christian Democrat, Pisanu has been a member of Silvio Berlusconi's Forza Italia (FI) since 1994 and, later, of the PdL. He was leader of FI in the Chamber of Deputies from 1996 to 2001, and minister of the Interior in Berlusconi's cabinets from 2002 to 2006. In 2006 he was elected to the Senate and, since then, he has become a critical figure within the party. Moreover, he was often seen as being interested in building a new Christian Democracy.

In early 2011 a group of senators started to coalesce around Pisanu. They were not a formal faction and were called Pisaniani. They included: some party heavyweights no longer under spotlight, such as Marcello Pera and Lamberto Dini; some fellow Sardinians, such as Mariano Delogu, Fedele Sanciu, Piergiorgio Massidda; some Christian democrats, such as Franco Orsi, Raffaele Lauro, Gabriele Boscetto, Vincenzo Oliva and, again, Sanciu; a large group of liberals, such as Paolo Amato (ex-PRI), Valter Zanetta (ex-PLI), Paolo Scarpa Bonazza Buora (ex-PLI) and the already mentioned Massidda (ex-PRI), Pera (ex-PR) and Dini, and social democrats, such as Ferruccio Saro (ex-PSI), Massimo Baldini (ex-PSI and ex-PSDI) and Carlo Vizzini (ex-PSDI, who left in early November 2011).

Soon after Berlusconi decided to resign from Prime Minister in November 2011, many Pisaniani, along with Scajoliani, opposed an early election and threatened to form a new party. In April 2012 Pisanu and Dini prepared a manifesto in which they said that they wanted to go "beyond the PdL" and form a larger centre-right political party. The document was signed by 29 MPs, notably including Paolo Amato, Gabriele Boscetto, Ombretta Colli, Fedele Sanciu, Raffaele Lauro, Giuseppe Menardi, Andrea Pastore, Gilberto Pichetto Fratin, Maurizio Saia, Ferruccio Saro, Guido Viceconte and Valter Zanetta.

In January 2013 Pisanu left the PdL in order to support Mario Monti's Civic Choice. Most of his followers remained in the PdL.
