= Club of Freedom (2009) =

Group within the Italian People of Freedom political party

Club of Freedom (Club della Libertà) is a grassroots organisation within The People of Freedom, a political party in Italy.

The Clubs are led by Mario Valducci, who, as one of the seven founding members of Forza Italia along with Silvio Berlusconi, had been coordinator of the "Clubs of Forza Italia". The Clubs' organisation includes Deborah Bergamini, Giorgio Stracquadanio, Isabella Bertolini, Michaela Biancofiore, Enrico Pianetta, Roberto Tortoli, Pasquale Giuliano and Paola Pelino. Since June 2010 Valducci and his clubs are active within the larger Liberamente faction led by other two Berlusconi's loyalists, Mariastella Gelmini and Franco Frattini.
