= Christopher Columbus Foundation =

Christopher Columbus Foundation Fondazione Cristoforo Colombo
- President: Claudio Scajola
- Secretary: Paolo Russo
- Ideology: Christian democracy
- National affiliation: The People of Freedom

Website
- www.fondazionecristoforocolombo.it

The Christopher Columbus Foundation, whose complete name is Christopher Columbus Foundation for Freedoms (Fondazione Cristoforo Colombo per le Libertà, FCL) was an organization and think tank connected to The People of Freedom (PdL), a political party in Italy. Its leader is Christian democrat Claudio Scajola.

== Background ==
The group around Claudio Scajola wielded a strong influence within Forza Italia, the main precursor of the PdL. During his five years as national coordinator of the party (1996–2001), Scajola built Forza Italia as a modern mass party and prepared it for several electoral victories. Scajola was minister in all governments of Silvio Berlusconi (2001–2006, 2008–present) until his resignation as minister of Economic Development in early 2010 over a scandal.

== History ==
After having left active politics for a while in 2010, Scajola soon started to re-organize his faction, whose leading members included Massimo Berruti, Paolo Russo, Maria Teresa Armosino, Ignazio Abrignani, Michele Scandroglio, Salvatore Cicu, Sandro Biasotti, Roberto Cassinelli, Raffaele Lauro, Paolo Tancredi and Giustina Destro. Most of them were former Christian Democrats, while others shared with Scajola the regional upbringing, hailing from Liguria, Scajola's power base, or neighbouring Piedmont.

In November 2010 the Christopher Columbus Foundation (FCL) was formed by Scajola in order to re-discover the original spirit of Forza Italia. The association was joined by Scajoliani and also by Antonio Martino, a former Liberal who was number two of Forza Italia in 1994 and minister of Foreign Affairs in Berlusconi's first government, as well as other liberals, such as Gregorio Fontana, and leading Christian democrats of the party, including Mario Baccini and Osvaldo Napoli.

In early 2011 Scajola, who had been cleared of any wrongdoing, started to prepare a strong comeback. At the beginning of March he declared that he had 62 MPs behind him and asked Berlusconi either a major role in the party organization or a return in government. Soon after Scajola criticized how the fusion between Forza Italia and National Alliance (AN) had been done, demanded a bigger role for those coming from Forza Italia and threatened to form separate parliamentary groups from the PdL.

The threat was renewed in October 2011, when Scajola and his followers asked for a new government, still led by Berlusconi, but with the Union of the Centre in it. A vote of confidence on Berlusconi's government was set on 14 October 2011, and Scajola announced that his group would vote for the government. However, he was not able two prevent two Venetian deputies, Giustina Destro and Fabio Gava from voting against the government, which survived the vote anyway.

On 2 November Destro and Gava, along with Roberto Antonione, Giorgio Stracquadanio, Isabella Bertolini and Giancarlo Pittelli, promoted an open letter in which they asked Berlusconi to step down and called for a new executive. Four "moderate" Scajoliani (Paolo Russo, Pietro Testoni, Andrea Orsini and Guglielmo Picchi) were present at the meeting, but did not sign the letter. Contextually, Antonione announced that he was leaving the party.

== Leadership ==
- President: Claudio Scajola (2010–present)
  - Secretary-General: Paolo Russo (2010–present)
  - Deputy Secretary-General: Massimo Berruti (2010–present)
  - Treasurer: Giustina Destro (2010–present)
- Honorary President: Antonio Martino (2010–present)
- President of the Political Committee: Mario Baccini (2010–present)
- President of the Scientific Committee: Raffaele Lauro (2010–present)
