= Scajoliani =

Scajoliani refers to the faction around Claudio Scajola, a leading member of The People of Freedom (PdL), a political party in Italy.

The group wielded particular influence within Forza Italia (FI), the main precursor of PdL. Scajola and his allies proposed a stronger party organization, differently from another major group, the Dellutriani, named after senator Marcello Dell'Utri. After the defeat in the 1996 general election, Silvio Berlusconi appointed Scajola national coordinator of the party. During the subsequent five years in charge of party organization (1996–2001), Scajola built FI as a modern mass party and prepared it for the huge electoral victories of 1999–2001 (European Parliament election, regional elections and general election).

After having left active politics for a while in 2010, Scajola soon started to re-organize his faction, whose leading members included Massimo Berruti, Paolo Russo, Maria Teresa Armosino, Ignazio Abrignani, Michele Scandroglio, Salvatore Cicu, Sandro Biasotti, Roberto Cassinelli, Raffaele Lauro, Paolo Tancredi and Giustina Destro. Most of them were former Christian Democrats, while others shared with Scajola the regional upbringing, hailing from Liguria, Scajola's power base, or neighbouring Piedmont.

In November 2010 the Christopher Columbus Foundation (FCL) was formed by Scajola in order to help the PdL discover again the original spirit of FI. The association was joined by Scajoliani and also by Antonio Martino, a former Liberal who was number two of FI in 1994 and minister of Foreign Affairs in Berlusconi's first government, as well as other liberals, such as Gregorio Fontana, and leading Christian democrats of the party, including Mario Baccini and Osvaldo Napoli.
