= The People of Freedom =

Italian centre-right political party

The People of Freedom Il Popolo della Libertà
- President: Silvio Berlusconi
- Secretary: Angelino Alfano (2011–2013)
- Coordinator: Denis Verdini; Sandro Bondi; Ignazio La Russa (2009–2012)
- Spokesperson: Daniele Capezzone
- Founded: 27 February 2008 (list); 29 March 2009 (party)
- Dissolved: 16 November 2013
- Merger of: Forza Italia; National Alliance; minor parties
- Succeeded by: Forza Italia
- Headquarters: Via dell'Umiltà 36; 00187 Rome
- Newspaper: Il Mattinale; Secolo d'Italia (until 2010)
- Student wing: National Student Movement
- Youth wing: Young Italy
- Membership (2011): 1,150,000 (disputed)
- Ideology: Liberal conservatism Christian democracy Liberalism; Conservatism
- Political position: Centre-right
- National affiliation: Centre-right coalition
- European affiliation: European People's Party
- European Parliament group: European People's Party
- Colors: Azure
- Anthem: Meno male che Silvio c'è ("Thank goodness for Silvio")

Website
- www.pdl.it

The People of Freedom (Italian: Il Popolo della Libertà, PdL) was a centre-right political party in Italy founded by Silvio Berlusconi. The PdL was launched as an electoral list, including Forza Italia and National Alliance, on 27 February for the 2008 Italian general election. The list was later transformed into a party during a party congress on 27–29 March 2009. The party's leading members included Angelino Alfano (national secretary), Renato Schifani, Renato Brunetta, Roberto Formigoni, Maurizio Sacconi, Maurizio Gasparri, Mariastella Gelmini, Antonio Martino, Giancarlo Galan, Maurizio Lupi, Gaetano Quagliariello, Daniela Santanchè, Sandro Bondi, and Raffaele Fitto.

The PdL formed the fourth Berlusconi government from 2008 to 2011 in coalition with Lega Nord. After having supported Mario Monti's technocratic government in 2011–2012, the party was part of Enrico Letta's government with the Democratic Party, Civic Choice and the Union of the Centre. Alfano functioned as Deputy Prime Minister and Minister of the Interior. In June 2013, Berlusconi announced Forza Italia's revival and the PdL's transformation into a centre-right coalition. On 16 November 2013, the PdL's national council voted to dissolve the party and start a new Forza Italia party; the assembly was deserted by a group of dissidents, led by Alfano, who had launched the New Centre-Right the day before.

== History ==
=== Background ===
In the run-up to the 2006 Italian general election, there was talk among the House of Freedoms coalition's member parties on merging into a "united party of moderates and reformers". Forza Italia (FI), National Alliance (AN) and the Union of Christian and Centre Democrats (UDC) all seemed interested in the project. Soon after the election, however, UDC leader Pier Ferdinando Casini, who had been a reluctant coalition partner, started to distance from its historical allies. Another party of the coalition, Lega Nord (LN), showed no interest in the idea, because of its character as a regionalist party.

On 2 December 2006, during a big rally of the centre-right in Rome against Romano Prodi's government, Silvio Berlusconi proposed the foundation of a "freedom party", stressing that centre-right voters were all part of a single "people of freedom". On 21 August 2007, Michela Brambilla, president of the Clubs of Freedom (a grassroot group), registered the name and the symbol of the "Freedom Party" (Partito della Libertà) on Berlusconi's behalf, but none of Berlusconi's allies seemed interested in joining such a party and some leading FI dignitaries looked disappointed.

=== "Running board revolution" ===
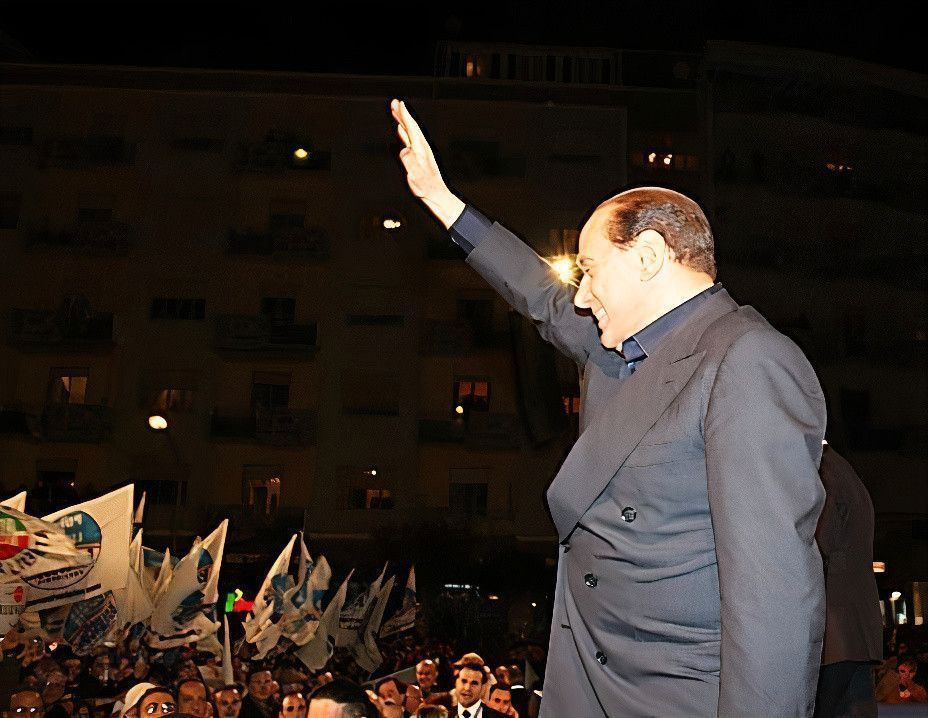
Silvio Berlusconi at a PdL rally

On 18 November 2007, Berlusconi claimed that his supporters had collected over 7 million signatures on an appeal demanding the President of the Republic, Giorgio Napolitano, to call a fresh general election. Shortly afterwards, from the running board of a car in a crowded Piazza San Babila in Milan, he announced that FI would soon merge or transform into a new "party of the Italian people". The new course was thus called the "running board revolution" (rivoluzione del predellino) and this expression soon became very popular both among Berlusconi's supporters and his adversaries.

At the beginning, the fate of FI remained unclear. Later, it was explained that the new party's core would consist of FI, the Clubs of Freedom and other grassroots groups, and that some minor parties of the House of Freedoms would join too. AN leader Gianfranco Fini made very critical statements in the days after Berlusconi's announcement, declaring the end of his support for Berlusconi as candidate for Prime Minister and that his party would not join the new party. Also UDC leader Casini criticised the idea from the start and seemed interested in an alternative coalition with Fini.

=== Foundation and early years ===
On 24 January, the Prodi II Cabinet fell as a result of the 2008 Italian political crisis, paving the way for a new general election. The day after Berlusconi hinted that FI would probably contest its last election, and postponed the foundation of the new party until after the election. In an atmosphere of reconciliation with Fini, Berlusconi also stated that the new party could involve the participation of other parties. On 8 February, Berlusconi and Fini agreed to form a joint list under the banner of The People of Freedom (PdL), in alliance with LN.

In addition to Forza Italia and the National Alliance, several minor parties and groups chose to join the PdL: the Clubs of Freedom of Michela Vittoria Brambilla, the Clubs of Good Government of Marcello Dell'Utri, the Liberal Populars (a splinter group from the UDC) of Carlo Giovanardi, the Christian Democracy for Autonomies of Gianfranco Rotondi, the Pensioners' Party of Carlo Fatuzzo, Liberal Reformers of Benedetto Della Vedova, the Italian Republican Party of Francesco Nucara, the New Italian Socialist Party of Stefano Caldoro, the Liberal Democrats (a splinter group from The Daisy) of Daniela Melchiorre, Decide! of Daniele Capezzone, Italians in the World of Sergio De Gregorio, Social Action of Alessandra Mussolini, the Libertarian Right (a splinter group from The Right) of Luciano Buonocore and the Reformist Socialists of Donato Robilotta.

In the 2008 Italian general election, the PdL won 37.4% of the vote, getting elected 276 deputies and 146 senators and becoming the Italian largest party. The PdL was also the first party since Christian Democracy in the 1979 Italian general election to get more than 35% of the popular vote. On 27–29 March 2009, the new party held its first congress in Rome and was officially founded. Berlusconi was elected president, while Sandro Bondi, Ignazio La Russa and Denis Verdini were appointed national coordinators, Maurizio Lupi organizational secretary and Daniele Capezzone spokesperson.

In the 2009 European Parliament election in Italy, the party won 35.2% of the national vote, returning 29 MEPs. In the big round of regional elections of 2010, the PdL retained Lombardy with Roberto Formigoni (in coalition with LN), gained Lazio with Renata Polverini (a former leader of the General Labour Union), Campania with Stefano Caldoro (a leading Socialist) and Calabria with Giuseppe Scopelliti (a former AN member). The PdL was also instrumental in the centre-right victories in Veneto and Piedmont, where two presidents of LN, Luca Zaia and Roberto Cota respectively, were elected.

=== Berlusconi vs. Fini ===
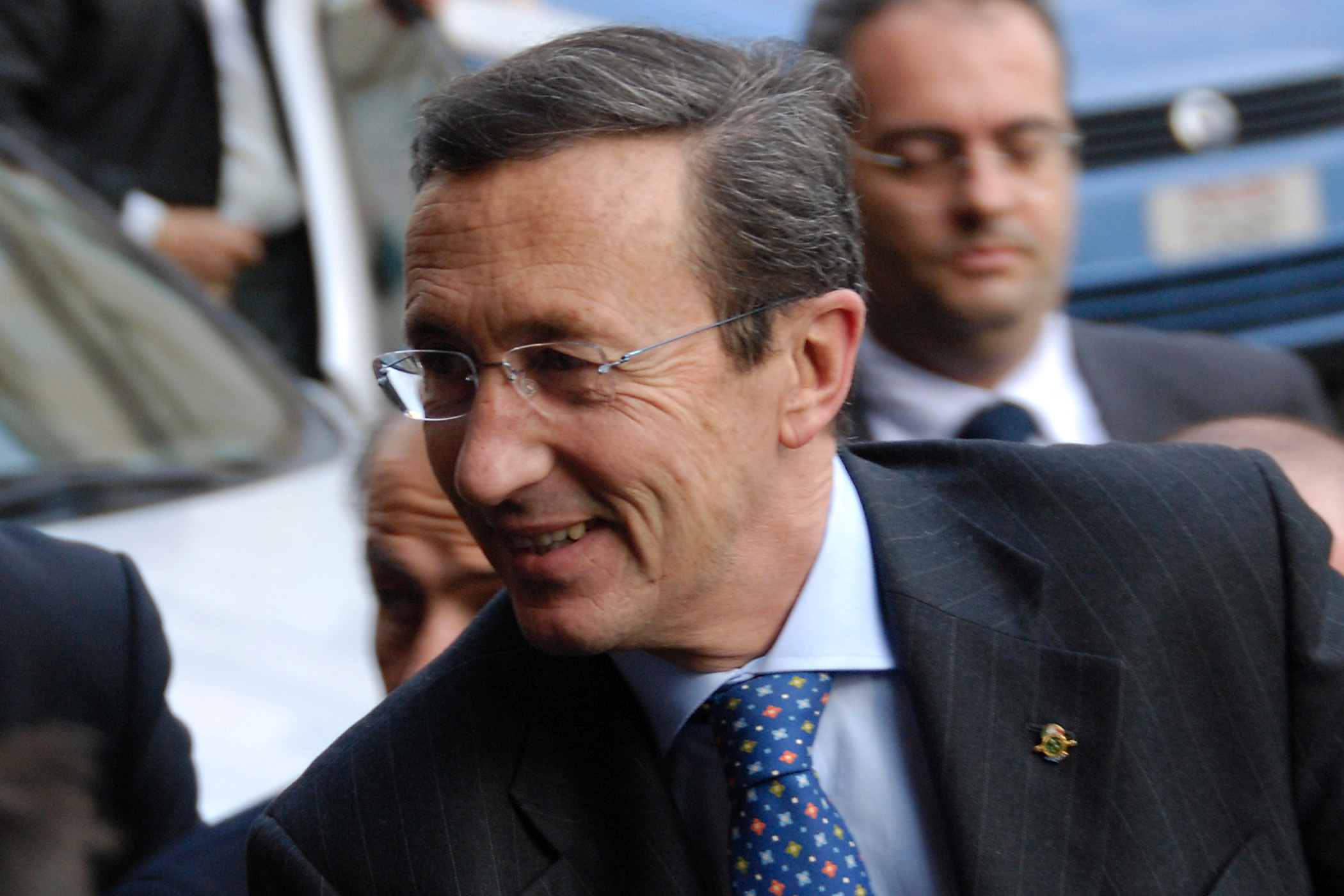
Gianfranco Fini

Between 2009 and 2010, Gianfranco Fini, former leader of the conservative AN and president of the Chamber of Deputies, became a vocal critic of the leadership of Berlusconi. Fini departed from party's majority line on stem cell research, end-of-life care, advance health care directive, and immigration, and he was a proponent of a more structured party organisation. His criticism was aimed at the leadership style of Berlusconi, who tended to rely on his personal charisma to lead the party from the centre, and supported a lighter form of party, which in his mind was to be a movement-party active only at election times, as the original FI and on some respects that of political parties in the United States.

Although some Finiani, such as Italo Bocchino, Carmelo Briguglio and Fabio Granata, shared Fini's views on moral issues and immigration, many others, including Andrea Ronchi and Adolfo Urso, were traditionalist. In fact most Finiani were Southern conservatives who opposed Berlusconi's firm alliance with LN, federal reform and Giulio Tremonti's economic policy. Fini made inroads among the liberal and centrist ranks of the former FI, but he lost the support of most leading members of the former AN, notably including Ignazio La Russa, Maurizio Gasparri and Altero Matteoli, who became close allies of Berlusconi. Others, including Gianni Alemanno and Alfredo Mantovano, found common ground with the party's Christian democrats.

On 15 April 2010, Bocchino launched an association named Generation Italy to better represent Fini's views within the party. Five days later 52 MPs (39 deputies and 13 senators) signed a document in support of Fini and his theses, while other 74 MPs former members of AN, including La Russa, Gasparri, Matteoli and Giorgia Meloni, plus Alemanno, mayor of Rome, signed an alternative document in which they reasserted their loyalty to the party and Berlusconi. On 22 April 2010, the national council of the PdL convened in Rome for the first time in a year. The conflict between Fini and Berlusconi was covered live on television. At the end of the day a resolution proposed by Berlusconi's loyalists was put before the assembly and approved almost unanimously.

Following then, clashes between Fini and Berlusconi became even more frequent and reached their height in late July, when Fini questioned the morality of some party bigwigs under investigation. On 29 July 2010, the executive committee released a document (voted by 33 members out of 37) in which Fini was described as "incompatible" with the political line of the PdL and unable to perform his job of President of the Chamber of Deputies in a neutral way. Berlusconi asked Fini to step down and the executive proposed the suspension from party membership of Bocchino, Briguglio and Granata, who had harshly criticised Berlusconi and accused some party members of criminal offences. As response, Fini and his followers formed their own groups in both chambers under the name of Future and Freedom (FLI). It was soon clear that FLI would leave the PdL and become an independent party. On 7 November, during a convention in Bastia Umbra, Fini asked Berlusconi to step down as Prime Minister and proposed a new government including the Union of the Centre (UdC). A few days later, the four FLI members in the government resigned. On 14 December FLI voted against Berlusconi in a vote of confidence in the Chamber of Deputies, a vote won by Berlusconi by 314 to 311.

=== Re-organisation and discontents ===
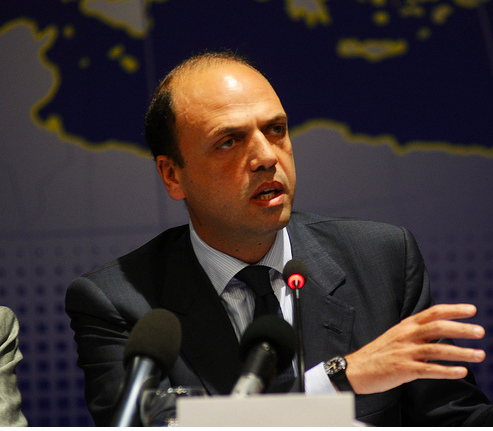
Angelino Alfano

In May 2011 the party suffered a big blow in local elections. Particularly painful was the loss of Milan, Berlusconi's hometown and party stronghold, where the outgoing PdL mayor Letizia Moratti was defeated by Giuliano Pisapia, a left-wing independent close to Nichi Vendola's Left Ecology Freedom party. In response to this and to crescent fibrillation within party ranks (especially among Scajoliani and ex-AN members), Angelino Alfano, then minister of Justice, was chosen as national secretary in charge of re-organising and renewing the party. The appointment of 40-year-old Alfano, a former Christian Democrat who had later been leader of FI in Sicily, was unanimously approved by the party executive. However, economy minister Giulio Tremonti expressed his concerns that the nominee would "make us lose votes in the North". On 1 July the national council modified the party's constitution and Alfano was elected secretary with little opposition.

Alfano led the party through a huge membership drive and, on 1 November, announced that more than one million individuals had joined the party. He also drove the party in a Christian-democratic direction. The factions which benefited most from the effort were those of Roberto Formigoni (Network Italy), Ignazio La Russa (Protagonist Italy) and Franco Frattini (Liberamente). The Christian-democratization of the party and the perceived marginalisation of liberals and social democrats led some to leave the party. One of these, Carlo Vizzini, declared: "It seems to me that the PdL is set to become the Italian section of the European People's Party [which already was]. I come from another tradition: I have been secretary of the PSDI and I was one of the founders of the Party of European Socialists. When I joined Forza Italia there were Liberals, Socialists, Radicals. Now everything has changed."

In the midst of the European sovereign debt crisis, on 14 October, following calls by Claudio Scajola and Giuseppe Pisanu for a new government, two deputies close to Scajola, Giustina Destro and Fabio Gava, voted against Berlusconi during a vote of confidence and left the party altogether. On 2 November, Destro and Gava, along with Roberto Antonione, Giorgio Stracquadanio, Isabella Bertolini and Giancarlo Pittelli (who had left the party along with Santo Versace in September), promoted an open letter in which they asked Berlusconi to step down. Contextually, Antonione announced that he was leaving the party. In the following days three more deputies, Alessio Bonciani, Ida D'Ippolito and Gabriella Carlucci, left to join the UdC. In three months, the PdL had lost 15 deputies and 4 senators, including the 7 deputies and 3 senators who launched Force of the South under Gianfranco Micciché.

=== Berlusconi's resignation ===
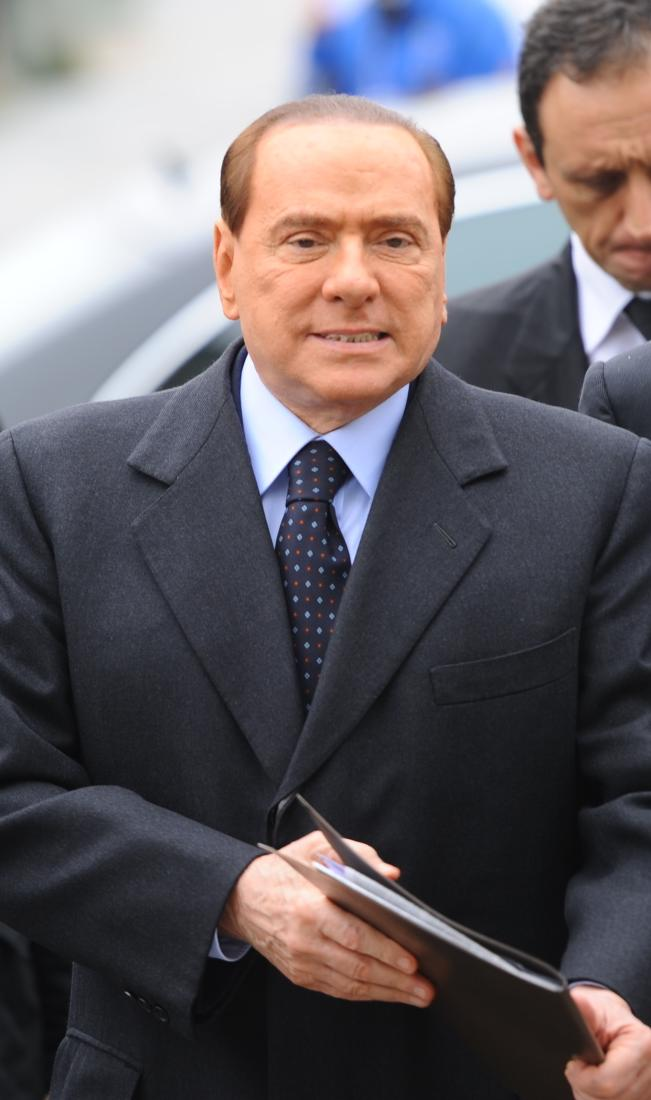
Silvio Berlusconi in 2012

On 7 November 2011 Lega Nord's then-leader Umberto Bossi proposed Angelino Alfano as Berlusconi's successor. On 8 November, during a key vote on a financial statement in the Chamber was approved thanks to the abstention of opposition parties, but Berlusconi got just 308 votes, 8 short of an absolute majority. Subsequently, Berlusconi announced that he intended to step down after the passage of the budget bill. Days of turmoil followed. Not only the party was highly divided, but its numerous factions and groups were divided too. As the appointment of Mario Monti, an independent economist and former European Commissioner, looked likely, some in the party wanted to support the new possible government (and some even wanted to join it), while others were resolutely against and preferred an early election instead. Alfano, in his capacity of secretary, had to mediate.

Among the party's Christian democrats, Roberto Formigoni, Maurizio Lupi and Raffaele Fitto (Network Italy), Claudio Scajola (Christopher Columbus Foundation), and Giuseppe Pisanu (hence Pisaniani) supported Monti, while Gianfranco Rotondi (Christian Democracy for Autonomies) and Carlo Giovanardi (Liberal Populars) did not. Within Liberamente and among the party's Socialists, Franco Frattini (who threatened to leave the party) and Fabrizio Cicchitto were in favour, while Mariastella Gelmini, Paolo Romani, Maurizio Sacconi, Renato Brunetta and, covertly, Giulio Tremonti were against. The vast majority of ex-AN members (Ignazio La Russa, Maurizio Gasparri, Altero Matteoli, Giorgia Meloni, etc.) was against, while a minority (mainly Gianni Alemanno) was in favour.

On 12 November Berlusconi tendered his resignation to President Giorgio Napolitano. The executive of the PdL decided to support a government led by Monti under some conditions, the first being that it should not include politicians but only technocrats. The Monti government took office on 16 November. In the subsequent votes of confidence in the two houses of Parliament, the PdL voted largely for Monti; however, some party members, including Antonio Martino, Gianfranco Rotondi and Alessandra Mussolini, deserted the party. Subsequently, LN broke its ties with the PdL at the national level.

=== 2013 general election ===
After long deliberation, on 24 October 2012, Berlusconi finally announced that he would not run again for Prime Minister in the 2013 Italian general election. In a written press release, the PdL leader also hinted that the party would select his successor through an open primary on 16 December. Berlusconi, who praised Monti, seemed to aim at a new centre-right led by Monti and a PdL led by Alfano. On 25 November eight candidates filed the required number of signature in support of their bid: Angelino Alfano, Giorgia Meloni, Giancarlo Galan (who renounced right after), Guido Crosetto, Daniela Santanchè, Michaela Biancofiore, Giampiero Samorì and Alessandro Cattaneo. However, on 28 November, after Berlusconi had expressed doubts on its success, the primary was cancelled altogether. On 6 December Alfano announced that Berlusconi would run again for Prime Minister. As soon as 12 December Berlusconi backtracked and stated that if Monti were to run for Prime Minister as the leader of a united centre-right (including also Luca Cordero di Montezemolo's Future Italy) he would stand aside and support him. The move appeased the pro-Monti majority of the party, while disappointing other party wings.

On 16 December the centrist majority of the party, consisting of several leading factions (Liberamente, Network Italy, Reformism and Freedom, Liberal Populars, New Italy, FareItalia, etc.), rallied in Rome under the "Popular Italy" banner: in presence of Alfano, the bulk of the party expressed its support for Monti and Berlusconi. On the very same day, a group of anti-Monti reformers, led by Crosetto and Meloni, organised a separate rally and espoused opposite views. On 17 December Ignazio La Russa announced he was leaving the PdL to form "National Centre-Right", aiming at representing not just anti-Monti right-wingers, but also the liberals and Christian democrats around Crosetto. On 21 December La Russa's National Centre-Right and the groups around Crosetto and Meloni joined forces and formed Brothers of Italy. To complete the picture of a highly fragmented centre-right, in the previous months there had already been two minor but significant splits from the PdL: on 3 October Giulio Tremonti left to form the Labour and Freedom List, while on 22 November a group of MPs, led by Isabella Bertolini, formed Free Italy.

In early January 2013, after Berlusconi had announced his return as party leader and Monti had refused to join forces with the PdL, the bulk of the party rallied again behind Berlusconi and just a few leading members, notably including Mario Mauro, left to join Monti's Civic Choice party. Most of the centre-right was regrouped around the PdL, which took part to the February general election in coalition with Lega Nord (including the Labour and Freedom List), Brothers of Italy, The Right, Great South (including the Movement for the Autonomies), the Pensioners' Party, the Moderates in Revolution and Popular Agreement. In the election the PdL obtained 21.6% of the vote (−15.8% from 2008) and the coalition came just 0.3% short of the centre-left. After some inconclusive attempts by Pier Luigi Bersani, leader of the Democratic Party, to form a government, the PdL joined Enrico Letta's government of grand coalition, providing five ministers, including Angelino Alfano who was appointed Deputy Prime Minister and Minister of the Interior, two deputy ministers and several under-secretaries.

=== Revival of Forza Italia ===
On 28 June 2013 Berlusconi announced the revival of the defunct Forza Italia and the transformation of PdL into a centre-right coalition. On 1 August 2013 Berlusconi was convicted for tax evasion and sentenced to four years of imprisonment, the last three being automatically pardoned. On 18 September, when discussing the enactment of a related six-year public office ban, as required by the "Severino law", the Senate committee in charge of elections refused to endorse a PdL resolution relinquishing Berlusconi's ban, as both the PD and the M5S disagreed. On the same day Berlusconi launched the new Forza Italia (FI) and pledged to stay on as its leader in any case. The would-be PdL coalition might include the new FI, Lega Nord and other parties. In fact, in disagreement with the new FI's liberalism, some members led by former mayor of Rome Gianni Alemanno, who left the PdL in October 2013, might form a conservative party modelled on the late National Alliance (AN), along with Brothers of Italy and other minor right-wing parties, and eventually join the coalition.

After months of bickering within the party between "doves", supporting Letta's government, and "hawks", very critical of it, on 28 September Berlusconi asked to the five ministers of the party (Angelino Alfano, Maurizio Lupi, Gaetano Quagliariello, Beatrice Lorenzin and Nunzia De Girolamo) to resign from the government over a tax hike. The ministers obeyed, but made clear that they dissented from the decision; Quagliariello and Lorenzin announced that they might not join the new FI, while Alfano described himself "differently berlusconiano". The party's moderates, mainly Christian democrats as Alfano and Lupi (Roberto Formigoni, Carlo Giovanardi, etc.) and social democrats (Fabrizio Cicchitto, Maurizio Sacconi, etc.), sided with the ministers, while the hawks led by Daniela Santanchè, most of whom liberals (Antonio Martino, Denis Verdini, Giancarlo Galan, Renato Brunetta, Sandro Bondi, Niccolò Ghedini, Daniele Capezzone, etc.), supported the exit from the government.

On 2 October a confidence vote, called by Prime Minister Letta, revealed the division within party ranks, to the extent that around 70 PdL lawmakers were ready to split to support the government, in case Berlusconi and the party had decided not to do the same. Faced by this ultimatum, Berlusconi made a U-turn few minutes ahead of the vote and subsequently tried a reconciliation process within the party to avoid the split. The outcome was a clear victory for the doves and the "ministerial faction" of the PdL, who continued to serve in the government. Raffaele Fitto, Christian democrat and leader of the self-proclaimed "loyalists" (the party's mainstream, including Mariastella Gelmini, Mara Carfagna, etc.), supported by Galan and Bondi, announced his disagreement with Alfano's political line and proposed a congress to decide the party's positionment, while the floor leaders, Maurizio Gasparri, Altero Matteoli, Paolo Romani and others came out as "mediators".

On 25 October, the PdL's executive committee voted to suspend all the party's activities and proposed the transformation of the current party into the new FI. Consequently, all the leadership roles in the PdL were temporarily revoked and a national council was summoned for 16 November. To approve the executive's proposal over the party's future, a 2/3 majority among voting delegates at the national council was required. On 16 November, the PdL was formally dissolved and replaced by the new FI, while a day earlier a group of dissidents, led by Alfano and including all five PdL ministers, had announced the formation of separate parliamentary groups, called New Centre-Right (NCD).

== Ideology and factions ==
The PdL aimed at combining together the traditions of its two main predecessors, Forza Italia (FI) and National Alliance (AN), as well as their smaller partners, among them Liberal Populars, Christian Democracy for Autonomies, New Italian Socialist Party, Liberal Reformers, and Social Action. FI, launched in 1994 by Silvio Berlusconi, was joined mainly by former Christian Democrats, Socialists, and Liberals who had seen their parties disappear amid the Tangentopoli scandals. AN, successor of the neo-fascist Italian Social Movement (MSI), had become a respectable conservative party under the leadership of Gianfranco Fini. FI and AN started to cooperate and were the pillars of the centre-right Pole of Good Government, Pole of Freedoms and House of Freedoms coalitions. The "Charter of Values" of the PdL underlined the "Christian" and "liberal" character of the party, presenting it as a defender of traditional values as well as of individual responsibility and self-determination. The document stressed the adherence of the party to the values and the platform of the European People's Party (EPP), its support for European integration and the transformation of Italy into a federal state.

The PdL was a classic example of catch-all party. The party's main cultural strains were Christian democracy and liberal conservatism, but it is not to be underestimated the weight of those coming from the right-wing AN and the relevant role played by former Socialists, who were disproportionately represented in Berlusconi IV Cabinet. Thy party has also been described as right-wing populist. Four leading ministers (Giulio Tremonti, Franco Frattini, Maurizio Sacconi, and Renato Brunetta) hailed from the old PSI, while another Socialist, Fabrizio Cicchitto, was the party leader in the Chamber of Deputies. This is not to say that all former Socialists were actually social democrats; for instance, while Tremonti was an outspoken critic of globalisation and is not enthusiastic about labour market flexibility, Brunetta was a free-market liberal and frequently clashed with Tremonti over economic and fiscal policy. Moreover, internal alliances were often not consistent with the previous affiliation of party members. On issues such as end of life, Sacconi, a former Socialist who still claimed to be a social democrat, sided with the party's Christian democrats and the social-conservative wing of the former AN, while several members hailing from the MSI found themselves in alliance with the liberal wing of the former FI. This is no surprise, as the late MSI also had a strong secular tradition, while FI was home to both social conservatives and uncompromising social liberals. On the economy, ex-FI Tremonti was often at odds with ex-FI liberals like Antonio Martino and Benedetto Della Vedova, and was attacked by Giancarlo Galan for being a "socialist".

Traditional values and the social market economy grew of importance in the rhetoric of the new party, partly replacing the small government and economic libertarian ideals expressed by FI. In this respect, Sacconi summarised the economic propositions of the PdL with the slogan "less state, more society"; however, in the PdL there was still some room for Reaganomics, with Berlusconi often making the case for lower taxes and Tremonti for deregulation and against red tape. The party has also been described as populist, or right-wing populist.

=== Factions (as of November 2011) ===
The party was home to a wide range of factions, groups and associate parties, whose ideology ranged from social democracy to national conservatism. As of November 2011, the factions, listed by political ideology, were as follows:

- Christian democrats. The core of the former Forza Italia (FI) plus some minor groups (Network Italy, Scajoliani/Christopher Columbus Foundation, Pisaniani, Christian Democracy for Autonomies, Liberal Populars, Christian Reformists, Federation of Christian Populars, and a plethora of local groups). Many party members hailed from the late Christian Democracy: they included Roberto Formigoni, Renato Schifani, Claudio Scajola, Angelino Alfano, Mario Mauro and Maurizio Lupi.
- Liberal-centrists. Various groups (Liberamente, Tremontiani, Magna Carta, Dellutriani) presided the centre of the party. Liberamente, led by Mariastella Gelmini and Franco Frattini, represented the bulk of FI, being composed by liberal loyalists of Berlusconi, and was probably the single largest faction within the party.
- Liberals. The liberal factions of the former FI (Free Foundation, Popular Liberalism) plus some new groupings (mainly Countercurrent). Leading liberals within PdL ranks were Antonio Martino, Raffaele Costa, Giancarlo Galan and Daniele Capezzone.
- Social democrats. The social democrats of the former FI, their organisations (Reformism and Freedom, We Reformers, Italian Reformists, European Reformists), plus the New Italian Socialist Party. Notably, several leading members of the party started their political career in the Italian Socialist Party and some of them still identified themselves as Socialists as members of the PdL: Franco Frattini, Giulio Tremonti, Maurizio Sacconi, Renato Brunetta, Fabrizio Cicchitto and Stefano Caldoro.
- Liberal conservatives. The bulk of the former National Alliance (AN)'s main factions (New Alliance, Protagonist Right), as well as people from other parties; Maurizio Gasparri and Ignazio La Russa re-organised their faction into Protagonist Italy, while Altero Matteoli launched the Foundation of Freedom.
- National conservatives. The right-wing of the former AN, which was represented by several groups (New Italy, Movement for Italy, Libertarian Right).
- Grassroots. Centre-right clubs in the tradition of the early FI (Promoters of Freedom, National Association Club of Freedom, Club of Freedom, Clubs of Good Government).

=== Factions (as of October 2013) ===
Apart from the above-mention factions, from 2013 four broad groupings were distinguishable:

- Doves (colombe). These centrists, mainly Christian democrats and social democrats, favoured a greater autonomy of the party from Silvio Berlusconi, supported the Letta Cabinet and lead the party from the minority. The doves included Angelino Alfano, Maurizio Lupi, Gaetano Quagliariello, Beatrice Lorenzin, Nunzia De Girolamo, Fabrizio Cicchitto, Roberto Formigoni, Carlo Giovanardi, and, to some extent, Renato Schifani.
- Mediators (mediatori). These centrists, including Renato Brunetta, Maurizio Gasparri, Altero Matteoli, Paolo Romani, Paolo Bonaiuti, Michela Vittoria Brambilla, Osvaldo Napoli and Stefano Caldoro, favoured party unity above everything else.
- Loyalists (lealisti). These supporters of Berlusconi and of the original Forza Italia, including most of the party's liberal conservatives and many Christian democrats, opposed Alfano's line. The loyalists included Raffaele Fitto, Mara Carfagna, Mariastella Gelmini, Mario Mantovani, Francesco Nitto Palma and Renata Polverini.
- Hawks (falchi). These hard-line liberals, including Denis Verdini, Daniela Santanchè, Giancarlo Galan, Sandro Bondi, Niccolò Ghedini and Daniele Capezzone, are the most loyal supporters of Berlusconi and repeatedly tried to convince him to bring down Letta's government. Most of them could have been considered "loyalists" too.

On 15 November, the day before the PdL's dissolution in the new FI, the "doves" left the party to form the New Centre-Right party.

=== Associate parties ===
The PdL granted financial support to several minor parties of the centre-right. They contributed one million Euros to the Liberal Democrats whose deputies were elected on the PdL list in 2008, and left the government camp after some months but returned in April 2011. Other parties who received payments from PdL were the Force of the South (€300,000), Christian Democracy for Campania (€144,000), Social Action (€100,000), Christian Democracy for Autonomies (€96,000), the Alliance of the Centre (€80,000), the Movement of National Responsibility (€49,000) and the Federation of Christian Populars (€40,000).

== Popular support ==
The PdL had its strongholds in Southern Italy, especially in Campania, Apulia and Sicily, but its power base included also two regions of the North, Lombardy and Veneto, where the party however suffered the competition of Lega Nord, which controlled the governorships of Piedmont, Lombardy and Veneto. The regions governed by a PdL governor in 2013 were just four (Campania, Calabria, Abruzzo, and Sardinia), far less than the Democratic Party and its allies, which controlled twelve. In the 2008 Italian general election, the party scored over 40% in Campania (49.1%), in Sicily (46.6%), Apulia (45.6%), Lazio (43.5%), and Calabria (41.2%). In the 2013 Italian general election, in which the PdL suffered a dramatic loss of votes, the party ran stronger in Campania (29.0%), Apulia (28.9%), and Sicily (26.5%).

The electoral results of the PdL in the regions of Italy are shown in the table below. As the party was launched in 2007, the electoral results from 1994 to 2006 refer to the combined result of the two main precursor parties: Forza Italia and National Alliance.

	1994 general	1995 regional	1996 general	1999 European	2000 regional	2001 general	2004 European	2005 regional	2006 general	2008 general	2009 European	2010 regional	2013 general
Piedmont	34.8	37.9	33.8	36.8	42.7	41.2	31.0	31.9	35.8	34.3	32.4	25.0	19.7
Lombardy	31.8	39.5	32.6	36.5	43.6	40.9	32.9	34.7	37.3	33.5	34.4	31.8	20.8
Veneto	31.4	34.7	28.8	34.3	40.2	40.5	33.6	30.8	35.8	27.4	29.3	24.7	18.7
Emilia-Romagna	25.5	28.5	26.6	29.0	32.6	33.5	28.2	27.1	28.8	28.6	27.4	24.6	16.3
Tuscany	27.3	32.2	30.1	30.4	35.2	34.7	28.7	27.9	29.5	31.6	31.4	27.1	17.5
Lazio	45.8	43.5	45.0	40.9	44.6	46.8	35.9	39.3	40.0	43.5	42.7	38.2	22.8
Campania	40.2	37.2	42.1	35.9	32.1	46.9	32.7	22.5	39.8	49.1	43.5	31.7	29.0
Apulia	27.3	41.1	42.5	40.7	44.2	45.4	36.4	38.9	40.5	45.6	43.2	31.1	28.9
Calabria	36.2	36.0	41.7	31.6	28.7	40.9	28.5	19.9	31.7	41.2	34.9	36.3	23.8
Sicily	47.6	31.2 (1996)	48.6	38.9	36.4 (2001)	47.4	36.0	29.8 (2006)	40.0	46.6	36.4	33.4 (2008)	26.5
ITALY	34.5	-	35.8	35.5	-	41.1	32.3	-	36.0	37.4	35.3	-	21.6

== Electoral results ==
=== Italian Parliament ===
Election	Leader	Chamber of Deputies					Senate of the Republic				
Election	Leader	Votes	%	Seats	+/–	Position	Votes	%	Seats	+/–	Position
2008	Silvio Berlusconi	13,629,096	37.4	276 / 630	New	1st	12,678,790	38.0	146 / 315	New	1st
2013	Silvio Berlusconi	7,332,667	21.6	98 / 630	▼178	3rd	6,829,135	22.3	98 / 315	▼47	3rd

=== European Parliament ===
Election	Leader	Votes	%	Seats	+/–	Position
2009	Silvio Berlusconi	10,807,794	35.3	29 / 72	New	1st

== Leadership ==
- President: Silvio Berlusconi (2008–2013)
- Secretary: Angelino Alfano (2011–2013)
- Coordinator: Sandro Bondi (2009–2013), Ignazio La Russa (2009–2012), Denis Verdini (2009–2013)
  - Organisation Secretary: Maurizio Lupi (2009–2013), Daniela Santanchè (2013)
  - Spokesperson: Daniele Capezzone (2009–2013)
- Party Leader in the Chamber of Deputies: Fabrizio Cicchitto (2008–2013), Renato Brunetta (2013)
- Party Leader in the Senate: Maurizio Gasparri (2008–2013), Renato Schifani (2013)
- Party Leader in the European Parliament: Mario Mauro (2009–2013), Giovanni La Via (2013)

== Symbols ==
Official logo

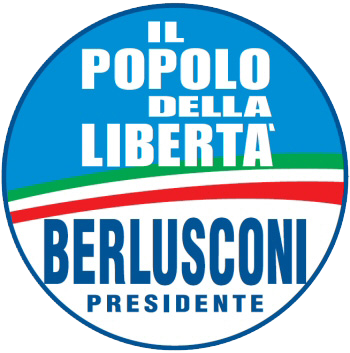
Electoral logo

== See also ==
- List of political parties in Italy

== Bibliography ==
- Duncan McDonnell (2013). "Silvio Berlusconi's Personal Parties: From Forza Italia to Popolo Della Libertà". Political Studies. 61 (S1): 217–233. doi:10.1111/j.1467-9248.2012.01007.x. S2CID 143141811.
- David Hine; Davide Vampa (2011). Another Divorce: The PdL in 2010. Italian Politics. Vol. 26. Berghahn. pp. 65–84.
