= Dellutriani =

Italian political faction

Dellutriani refers to the faction around Marcello Dell'Utri, a leading member of Forza Italia and, later, of The People of Freedom, a political party in Italy. Generally speaking, they had been proponents of a stronger party organization in opposition to Scajoliani.

The national organization of Dell'Utri is named Clubs of Good Government, which were first launched in 1999 "in order to contribute to the development and circulation of liberal culture". Through these clubs Dell'Utri, along with other grassroots networks, has been able to elect young people to the Italian Parliament, notably including Nicola Formichella.
