= Liberamente =

Liberamente (which literally means "freely", but is also a play on words meaning "free mind") is a liberal-centrist foundation and think-tank within Forza Italia (FI), a political party in Italy. Its main leader is Mariastella Gelmini and, previously, Franco Frattini.

Founded on 20 June 2010, the faction was one of the strongest within The People of Freedom as its members included eight ministers (Mariastella Gelmini, Franco Frattini, Maurizio Sacconi, Stefania Prestigiacomo, Mara Carfagna, Raffaele Fitto, Paolo Romani and Giancarlo Galan), plus Mario Valducci (leader of the Clubs of Freedom), Luigi Casero, Giorgio Stracquadanio, Giampiero Cantoni, Valentina Aprea, Giancarlo Serafini, Romano Comincioli, Lara Comi, Guido Podestà and Licia Ronzulli. These, along with Christopher Columbus Foundation on opposite sides, represented the bulk of the former Forza Italia party, merged with National Alliance into the PdL in 2009, and were mostly liberals or former Socialists, although the faction included also some leading Christian democrats such as Fitto.

Liberamente was born to reaffirm the identity of Forza Italia within the PdL, in opposition to Gianfranco Fini's Generation Italy/Future and Freedom. In Sicily the faction, through Prestigiacomo, approached with Gianfranco Micciché, leader of the rebels of the PdL–Sicily. This caused outrage from the Sicilian majority of the party led by Renato Schifani and Angelino Alfano, two leading Christian democrats and former members of Forza Italia too. When Micciché launched Force of the South outside the PdL, Prestigiacomo was very sympathetic and took part to the new party's convention, but remained loyal to the PdL.

Most Liberamente members (with the notable exceptions of Frattini and Sacconi) joined the new Forza Italia in November 2013.
