= Network Italy =

Network Italy (Rete Italia) is a Christian-democratic association connected to Popular Alternative (AP), a political party in Italy, and earlier to The People of Freedom. Most of its members, including its long-time leader Roberto Formigoni, are members of the Catholic lay movement Communion and Liberation (CL).

== History ==
The political involvement of large chunks of CL dates back to the Seventies. In 1975 Formigoni organised the Popular Movement (MP) as a faction within Christian Democracy (DC). In January 1994, when the DC was dissolved, its members joined the Italian People's Party (PPI) and, a year later, they founded the United Christian Democrats (CDU), along with Rocco Buttiglione. Formigoni, who had been elected President of Lombardy in April 1995 thanks to the support of Silvio Berlusconi's Forza Italia (FI), was appointed president of the CDU at the party's founding congress in July. In 1998, when Buttiglione temporarily aligned his party with the centre-left in support of D'Alema I Cabinet (through the Democratic Union for the Republic, UDR), Formigoni and his followers (known as Formigoniani) formed the Christian Democrats for Freedom (CDL). When Buttiglione re-established the CDU and re-positioned it in the centre-right, joining the House of Freedoms coalition in 2000, Formigoni, his Formigoniani and many regional councillors from northern regions had already joined FI.

In 2006 Network Italy was organized as an association within Forza Italia. Leading members of the faction, whose powerbase was in Lombardy, have included Maurizio Lupi, Mario Mauro, Giancarlo Abelli, Adriano Paroli, Maurizio Bernardo, Mario Malossini, Raffaello Vignali, Aldo Brandirali and Mario Sala.

In 2009 the association, along with Forza Italia, joined The People of Freedom (PdL) party.

In November 2010, during a convention in Milan, Formigoni formed an alliance with other two party bigwigs, Raffaele Fitto and Angelino Alfano. The aim of the initiative was to reinforce the Catholic image of the party. The ties with Franco Frattini's Liberamente and Gianni Alemanno's New Italy were reinforced too.

In December 2012 Mauro, who had been the FI/PdL leader in the European Parliament since 1999, broke with the PdL and joined Civic Choice (SC).

In November 2013, upon the transformation of the PdL into a new Forza Italia, the entire faction joined Alfano's New Centre-Right (NCD).

In March 2017 the NCD was dissolved into Popular Alternative (AP).
