= Tremontiani =

Italian political faction

Tremontiani referred to the faction around Giulio Tremonti, a leading member of The People of Freedom (PdL), a political party in Italy.

Close to Tremonti is ResPublica, a liberal think tank led by Eugenio Belloni. The scientific committee of the foundation includes former leading liberal figures of the PdL, such as Giuliano Urbani, Vittorio Mathieu and Luigi Compagna, and international scholars, such as James M. Buchanan and James Heckman.

In October 2012 Tremonti left the PdL in order to launch the Labour and Freedom List, which would form an alliance with Lega Nord for the 2013 general election.
