= Denis Verdini =

Italian politician and banker (born 1951)

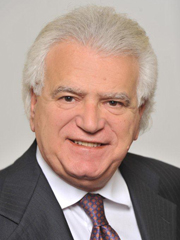

Member of the Senate of the Republic
- In office 15 March 2013 – 23 March 2018
- Constituency: Tuscany

Member of the Chamber of Deputies
- In office 26 May 2001 – 14 March 2013
- Constituency: Tuscany

Member of the Regional Council of Tuscany
- In office 7 June 1995 – 4 July 2001

Personal details
- Born: 8 May 1951 (age 75) Fivizzano, Italy
- Party: PSI (until 1992); PRI (1992–1994); FI (1995–2009); PdL (2009–2013); FI (2013–2015); ALA (2015–2018)
- Children: 3
- Education: University of Florence
- Profession: Tax advisor

Denis Verdini (born 8 May 1951) is an Italian politician and banker.

== Biography ==
Born in Fivizzano, Verdini graduated in Political Sciences from the University of Florence and later became president of the local cooperative bank, Credito Cooperativo Fiorentino.

A local councillor for the Italian Socialist Party (PSI) in the late 1980s, he began his national political career in the Italian Republican Party (PRI), standing unsuccessfully as one of the party's candidates at the 1994 general election. After Silvio Berlusconi's victory in that election, he became a member of his Forza Italia party. He was subsequently elected to the Italian Parliament in 2001, 2006 and 2008. He is a minor shareholder (15%) in the newspaper Il Foglio.

In 2009, after Berlusconi created The People of Freedom, he was named a member of the national coordination office, together with Ignazio La Russa and Sandro Bondi.

On 23 July 2010 he resigned as president of Credito Cooperativo Fiorentino following his involvement in the so-called "P3" scandal, in which he had been charged for participating in illegal secret activities, aiming to influence the verdict of the Italian Constitutional Court regarding the Lodo Alfano (the law was later declared anti-constitutional).

In July 2015, Verdini left Forza Italia and founded a new political party, the Liberal Popular Alliance, in support of Matteo Renzi's government.

In March 2016, Verdini was sentenced by the Seventh Criminal Chamber of the Court of Rome to two years' imprisonment for complicity in corruption relating to the renovation of the School of Marshals and Brigadiers in Florence.

Party political offices
Preceded by Sandro Bondi	National coordinator of Forza Italia; 2008–2009	Succeeded by Himself with Sandro Bondi and Ignazio La Russa as National Coordinator of People of Freedom
New political party	National coordinator of The People of Freedom; 2009 – 2013; With: Sandro Bondi and Ignazio La Russa	Party dissolved
