= Labour and Freedom List =

Labour and Freedom List Lista Lavoro e Libertà
- Leader: Giulio Tremonti
- Founded: 7 October 2012
- Dissolved: March 2013
- Split from: The People of Freedom
- Ideology: Fiscal conservatism Neomercantilism; Christian democracy Social democracy Social conservatism Alter-globalization; Federalism
- Political position: Centre/Centre-right
- Colours: Blue, Orange

Website
- www.listalavoroliberta.it

The Labour and Freedom List (Lista Lavoro e Libertà, 3L) was a political party in Italy led by Giulio Tremonti formed in October 2012 and dissolved less than six months later.

== History ==
In a press conference, on 3 October 2012, Tremonti explained that the party might also be called Forward Together (Avanti Insieme). The words "forward" and "together" were, respectively, tributes to the social-democratic tradition (Avanti! was the newspaper of the Italian Socialist Party, PSI) and the Catholic one, the two wings upon which the new party was founded. The party defined itself as being neither centre-right nor centre-left: the former was criticised for supporting economic liberalism and neglecting social rights, the latter for rejecting traditions and being too liberal on immigration and ethical issues.

At the party's founding convention, on 6–7 October 2012, speakers included Rino Formica, a former minister of Finance, of whom Tremonti was a protégé within the PSI. Tremonti, who had been four times minister of Economy and Finance (1994–1995, 2001–2004, 2005–2006, 2008–2012) under Silvio Berlusconi and vice president of Forza Italia (2005–2009), was thus leaving The People of Freedom, the party of which he had been among the leading founding member in 2009.

On 5 December Tremonti signed a political pact with Roberto Maroni, leader of Lega Nord (LN). This led to an electoral pact for the 2013 general election, under which Tremonti and his followers were included in Lega Nord's lists. Tremonti stood as candidate for the Senate in Lombardy and headed the list in most southern regions. He and Paolo Naccarato were thus elected, but soon distanced from Lega Nord. Also, soon after the election, 3L ceased to be active as a party.

== Electoral results ==
Chamber of Deputies
Election year	Votes	%	Seats	+/−	Leader
2013	into Lega Nord	–	0 / 630	–	Giulio Tremonti

Senate of the Republic
Election year	Votes	%	Seats	+/−	Leader
2013	into Lega Nord	–	2 / 315	–	Giulio Tremonti
