= Giustina Destro =

Italian politician and entrepreneur

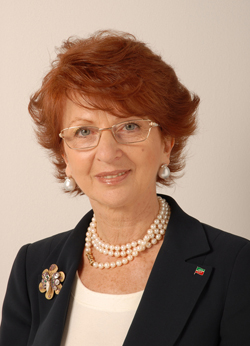
Giustina Mistrello in Destro

Giustina Mistrello Destro (Padua, 9 June 1945) is an Italian politician and entrepreneur.

An entrepreneur by profession, Destro joined politics relatively late in her life. In 1999 she formed a list for Padua municipal election and ran as an independent candidate for mayor, with the support of centre-right parties, notably including Forza Italia (FI). Her bid was successful as she defeated outgoing mayor Flavio Zanonato in a run-off. Having joined FI in 2001, she ran as the official FI candidate four years later. Most Paduans were unimpressed by her record as mayor and she was consequently trounced in the election: she obtained just 33.6% of the vote and her long-time opponent Zanonato went on to win in the first round with 51.9% of the vote.

Despite her unpopularity among voters in Padua, she continued her political career through the ranks of FI and, later, The People of Freedom (PdL). She was elected to the Italian Chamber of Deputies at the 2006 general election and re-elected in 2008. An enthusiastic supporter of fellow entrepreneur Silvio Berlusconi, during her second term as deputy, she grew critical of him. In November 2010 she joined former minister Claudio Scajola and the Christopher Columbus Foundation, whose members were known as Scajoliani and tended to be critical of Berlusconi. In August 2011 she expressed her support for Luca Cordero di Montezemolo's Future Italy.

On 14 October 2011 Destro voted against Berlusconi's government during a vote of confidence. Following this, she abruptly left the PdL and confirmed her support to Montezemolo instead, saying that he would soon launch his political bid.
