= Gabriele Boscetto =

Italian politician (1944–2021)

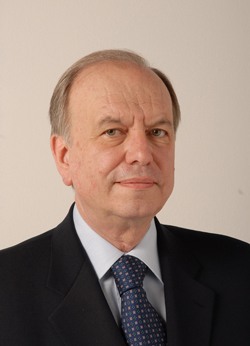
Gabriele Boscetto

Gabriele Boscetto (25 September 1944 – 21 June 2021) was an Italian politician who served as a Senator and the President of the Province of Imperia from 1995 to 2001.
