= Sandro Bondi =

Italian politician (born 1959)

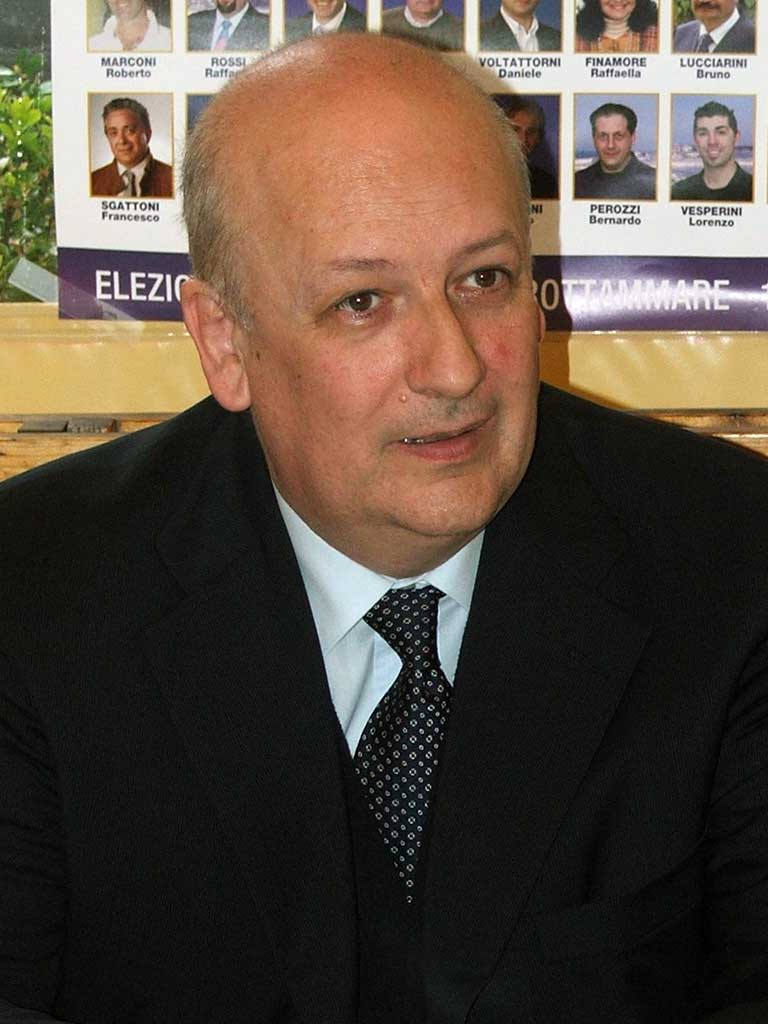

Minister of Cultural Heritage and Activities
- In office 8 May 2008 – 23 March 2011
- Prime Minister: Silvio Berlusconi
- Preceded by: Francesco Rutelli
- Succeeded by: Giancarlo Galan

Member of the Senate of the Republic
- In office 29 April 2008 – 22 March 2018
- Constituency: Tuscany (2008–2013); Lombardy (2013–2018)

Member of the Chamber of Deputies
- In office 30 May 2001 – 28 April 2008
- Constituency: Lombardy 1 (2001–2006); Campania 1 (2006–2008)

Personal details
- Born: 14 May 1959 (age 67) Fivizzano, Italy
- Party: PCI (until 1991); FI (1994–2009); PdL (2009–2013); FI (2013–2015); ALA (2015–2016); Independent (since 2016)
- Spouse: Manuela Repetti
- Education: University of Pisa
- Profession: Politician

Sandro Bondi (born 14 May 1959) is an Italian politician. He served as minister of culture from 2008 to 2011 in the fourth Berlusconi government.

== Biography ==
Bondi was born in Fivizzano, province of Massa-Carrara. He first attended school at Lausanne, where his emigrant father had settled. The family later returned to Italy and at a young age, Sandro joined the Italian Communist Youth Federation, soon becoming its secretary in Lunigiana. He gained a laurea in philosophy from the University of Pisa with a dissertation on Leonardo Valazzana, precursor of the Augustinian order and opponent of Girolamo Savonarola.

A Catholic democrat, he campaigned for the Italian Communist Party, and was elected mayor of Fivizzano in 1990. In 1992 the town council led by him was overturned by the local Socialist Party, in association with Christian Democracy. Activists already playfully compared him to a ravanello (radish): that is, red on the outside but white on the inside. Following these events, he left the PCI.

Subsequently, getting to know Silvio Berlusconi via the sculptor Pietro Cascella, he became Berlusconi's secretary, collaborator and faithful advisor, so much so that - for Berlusconi's 2001 campaign - he was given the task of quickly coordinating the compilation of Una storia italiana (An Italian Story), a book of photographs on Berlusconi's public and private life, as electoral propaganda for future elections (as used by all Italian families).

Bondi returned the great trust accorded him by Berlusconi over the years by becoming one of his main supporters, publicly proclaiming his devotion and fidelity to him on several occasions, as well as in poems he composed and read on television programmes, which were a major target for his critics and for satirists.

In the 2001 general election he was elected to the Chamber of Deputies for Berlusconi's Forza Italia party in the III circoscrizione (Lombardia 1). In the campaign for the 2005 regional elections, he organised the party's communications and was the same year named the party's coordinator. In the 2006 general election he was re-elected to the Chamber, elected from the results of circoscrizione XX (Campania 2). In the meantime, he collaborated with Vanity Fair on a poetry page. In the summer of 2006 he published his latest sayings under the title "Laici e credenti: una fede comune".

In the course of the 2008 general election he participated in hustings in several Italian towns, as well as one in teatro Fenaroli in the city of Lanciano, where he declared that he did not wish to leave Berlusconi alone in government, as had been done in the past, thus leaving an invitation for all to lean on and encourage him. In the 2008 election, he was a People of Freedom candidate for Senate for the Tuscany region, as well as a centre-right candidate for president of the Province of Massa-Carrara. He was elected to the Senate, and he reached the second ballot for the provincial presidency with Osvaldo Angeli (candidate for the centre-left Democratic Party), which Angeli then won with 55.4% of the vote, against Bondi's 46%.

In 2008 he was made culture minister in the fourth cabinet of Berlusconi, relinquishing his post as national co-ordinator of Forza Italia to Denis Verdini. During his tenure of the ministry, he announced the appointment of a special commissioner for the ruins at Pompeii and was censured for criticising modern art and architecture.
