= Free Foundation =

- Leader: Bruno Bernardi
- Founder: Renato Brunetta, Franco Frattini
- Founded: 2000
- Ideology: Liberalism; Fiscal federalism
- Political position: Centre
- National affiliation: Forza Italia

Website
- www.freefoundation.com

The Free Foundation (Free Foundation, FREE) is a think tank within Forza Italia, a political party in Italy.

Although most of its leading members are former members of the Italian Socialist Party and thus have social-democratic roots, the group expresses liberal and libertarian stances. The core proposals of the association are free market, small government, subsidiarity, political and fiscal federalism.

The Foundation was launched in 2000 by Renato Brunetta, minister of Public Administration in Berlusconi IV Cabinet, and Franco Frattini, minister of Foreign Affairs. Other leading members are Giuliano Cazzola, Giorgio Stracquadanio, Arturo Diaconale and Davide Giacalone. The group regularly issues many books in collaboration with Libero and Il Giornale, two leading centre-right newspapers, edited by Maurizio Belpietro and Vittorio Feltri respectively.

== Leadership ==
- President: Renato Brunetta (2000–2008), Canio Zampaglione (2008–2010), Rodolfo Ridolfi (2010–2012), Bruno Bernardi (2012–present)
