= Isabella Bertolini =

Italian politician (born 1963)

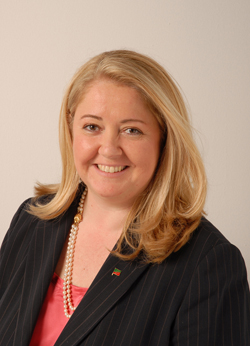

Member of Chamber of Deputies
- In office 2001–2013

Personal details
- Born: 21 July 1963 (age 62) Modena, Italy
- Party: PLI (till 1994); FI (1994-2009); PdL (2009-2012); IL (2012-2013); Lega (since 2019)
- Profession: Politician, lawyer

Isabella Bertolini (born 21 July 1963) is an Italian politician.

== Biography ==
She started her political activity in the youth organization of the Italian Liberal Party.

Bertolini ran with Forza Italia in the 1994 general election in the "Modena - Sassuolo" constituency, but, with 29% of the vote, she was defeated by the candidate of the Progressives Franco Danieli. Also in 1994 she was appointed by Silvio Berlusconi as Provincial Coordinator for Modena of Forza Italia, then confirmed at the 1997 provincial congress.

In 1994–1999 and 1999–2004 she was a municipal councilor in Modena. Furthermore, in 1995 she was elected to the Legislative Assembly of Emilia-Romagna, then reconfirmed in 2000 with 8,870 preferences; she also served as the group leader of Forza Italia in the regional council.

In 2000 she began the Regional Coordinator of Forza Italia in Emilia-Romagna.

She was elected to the Chamber of Deputies following the 2001 general election, then re-confirmed in the 2006 and 2008 general election.

On 22 November 2012 she announced her resignation from The People of Freedom together with other four deputies (Gaetano Pecorella, Roberto Tortoli, Franco Stradella and Giorgio Stracquadanio) and founded Free Italy (Italia Libera), a new political party that looked to Future Italy, the new political formation led by Luca Cordero di Montezemolo and Andrea Riccardi, with the aim to continue the political experience of the Monti Cabinet. However, in 2013 you renounced a candidacy on the Monti list due to too many ambiguities and indecisions about the matter of a future alliance with the centre-left coalition.

In 2019 Bertolini announced her candidacy in the 2020 regional election in Emilia-Romagna among the ranks of the League; with 2,211 preferences, she was not elected to the regional council.
