= Raffaele Lauro =

Italian politician

Raffaele Lauro (born 10 February 1944, in Sorrento) is an Italian politician, member of the Senate of Italy, prefect and a private adviser for institutional relations and communication.

== Early life and education ==
Raffaele Lauro was born in Sorrento to Luigi and Angela Aiello, one of four brothers. In his youth, he worked as a receptionist in hotels in the Sorrento Peninsula. He attended high school in Sorrento, at the Sant'Anna Institute, graduating with honours and reporting of the Commission.

After high school, he continued his studies at the University of Naples Federico II. There, he got three degrees: in Political Science, cum laude, with a thesis on the history of Afro-Asian countries': "Political and economic reflections of the Vietnam War"; in Law, cum laude, with a thesis in International Law, "International Law and German post-Kantian philosophy" and later in Economics, cum laude, with a degree in Theory and Techniques of Trading Market "The mutual funds: Perspectives on the Italian market."

In 1968 he won a scholarship at the Ministry of Foreign Affairs, and during the next four years, he first attended courses at the Diplomatic Institute at the Ministry of Foreign Affairs and then he studied foreign policy, in Paris, at the Documentation française.

In Rome, at the Institute of Journalism and Audiovisual Techniques, he also got a degree in Journalism, cum laude and became a journalist, member of the Order of Journalists of Lazio and Molise. He was then director of the scientific magazine Post and Telecommunications published by the Fondazione Ugo Bordoni and has worked as commentator of new information technologies, for "Il Tempo" in Rome and "Il Mattino" in Naples. For Radiocorriere TV, he has been a columnist about citizens and institutions. At the New University of Cinema and Television in Rome, he graduated in Directing Film, with Masters Giuseppe De Santis, Carlo Lizzani and Florestano Vancini.

== Career ==
Since 1971, he was a professor of History and Philosophy in high schools. For many years, he has taught Law of Mass Communications at the Faculty of Political Sciences at LUISS University in Rome.

=== Political career ===
The administrative-institutional activities of Raffaele Lauro began in Sorrento in 1980. Pupil of politician Francesco Compagna, he was elected Councillor of Sorrento, holding the positions of Deputy Mayor, Councillor for Finance, Personnel and Culture. During the period in which he took the latter department, he organized the Public Library of Sorrento and established a theatre school, with director Lorenzo Ferrero di Roccaferrera and a theatrical review, with actor Bruno Cirino Pomicino.

He left Sorrento in 1984 and he moved to Rome where he was chief of the secretariat of the Post and Telecommunications Ministry, of the Finance Ministry and of the Interior Ministry, he was Councillor of the National Audit Office then head Prefect. He has had a sensitive assignment at the Interior Ministry (Chief of Cabinet, Director of Border Regions and Inspector General of Administration). In October 2003 he was appointed Councillor to the Minister of Government Program Implementation at the Office of the Prime Minister. From May 2005 to May 2006 he was Chief of the cabinet of the Production Activities Ministry. From June 2006 until February 2008 he was Special Government Commissioner for the Coordination of Anti-racket and Anti-usury Initiatives and Chairman of the Solidarity Commission for the victims of extortion and usury.

In the 2008 general election, he was elected Senator for the "People of Freedom" party, in the district of Campania. He was appointed member of the Parliamentary Committee of Inquiry into the Mafia and other criminal organizations, including foreign ones, member of the parliamentary committee for the general guidance and supervision of broadcasting services, the First Committee (Constitutional Affairs), until April 2012 and then a member of the Sixth Committee (Finance and Treasury). He was also a Political Advisor to the security of the Minister of Economic Development, the Hon. Claudio Scajola.

On 21 January 2013, he left the PDL Group of the Senate of the Republic to join the Misto Group.

On 9 December 2014, he has been appointed as a member of the board of the Fondazione Link Campus University and member of the board of the University.

Since July 2020 he has been Secretary-General of Unimpresa. With effect from 1 July 2023, he left the position of General Secretary of Unimpresa, due to new professional commitments.

=== Writing career ===
Lauro is a freelance journalist, essayist, screenwriter, author, director, librettist and writer. Among his most important essays include:

- "Viêtnam: ricerca della pace perduta", 1969
- "La D.C. verso il Duemila", Rusconi Editore, 1984
- "A look at China. Political and economic notes", 1986
- "Comunicazioni e sviluppo: la sfida del cambiamento", Ed. CEI, 1987
- "Da Moro: il futuro della democrazia in Italia", 1987
- "Comunicazione e trasparenza bancaria", con P.Rivitti, Ed. CEI, 1990
- "Mondazzi. Sulla via di Damasco", 1990
- "Leadership e preferenza unica" Maggioli Editore, 1992
- "Il Prefetto della Repubblica", con G.Balsamo, Maggioli Editore
- "La riforma elettorale", 1992
- "La Prefettura - Tra presente e futuro" con M. Guaitoli, Maggioli Editore, 2000
- "Verso la Nuova Europa", Edizioni Goldengate, Roma, 2004
- "Il Prefetto della Repubblica - Tra Istituzioni e Società" di Raffaele Lauro e Vincenzo Madonna, Edizioni Maggioli, 2005
- "Il vento nuovo - La lotta al racket e all'usura (2006 - 2008)", Maggioli Editore, 2008
- "Maria, Madre di Misericordia e Madre di Gesù, ponte di dolcezza e di pace tra Cristianesimo e Islam", GoldenGate Edizioni, 2015
- L'Italia sul baratro - Tra il vecchio e il nuovo regime (PDF). GoldenGate Edizioni. 2018.
- "Diario della pandemia Covid-19 - IO ACCUSO", GoldenGate Edizioni, 2020
- Preface to La Costiera dell’Incanto - Storia della Costiera Sorrentina, by Vincenzo F. R. Esposito, La Città del Sole, 2022
- Preface to La comunicazione politica nell'era delle nuove tecnologie e dell'AI, by Riccardo Piroddi, Eurilink University Press, 2024

Among the works of fiction, also written under the pseudonym Ralph Lorbeer:

- "Roma a due piazze", Edizioni CEI, 1987
- "Metropolitania", Rusconi Editore, 1991
- "Il sogno di Pedro", Rusconi Editore, 1993
- "Il progetto","La crociera" and " La condanna", Lancio Editore, 1997
- "Mutus", Lancio Editore, 1998
- "Quel film mai girato" Volume I, GoldenGate Edizioni, 2002
- "Quel film mai girato" Volume II, GoldenGate Edizioni, 2003
- "Cossiga Suite", GoldenGate Edizioni, 2009
- "Sorrento The Romance", GoldenGate Edizioni, 2013
- "Caruso The Song - Lucio Dalla and Sorrento", GoldenGate Edizioni, 2015
- "Lucio Dalla and San Martino Valle Caudina. In the eyes and in the heart", GoldenGate Edizioni, 2016
- "Lucio Dalla and Sorrento Tour - Stages, images and testimonies", GoldenGate Edizioni, 2016
- "Dance The Love - A Star in Vico Equense", GoldenGate Edizioni, 2016 presented in Vico Equense, in national première, on 27 July, within the Social World Film Festival - International Exhibition of Social Cinema
- "Dance The Love - A Star in Vico Equense. Images - Testimonies", with Riccardo Piroddi, GoldenGate Edizioni, 2016
- "Interviews&cConversations about Don Alfonso 1890 - Salvatore Di Giacomo and Sant'Agata sui Due Golfi" (PDF). GoldenGate Edizioni. 2017.
- "Don Alfonso 1890 - Salvatore di Giacomo and Sant'Agata sui Due Golfi", GoldenGate Edizioni, 2017
- "The Universe of Fragrances - The artistic epic of a master perfumer: Maurizio Cerizza", GoldenGate Edizioni, 2019

Musical compositions, tragedies and television documentaries

- "Voyage" (for soprano and piano coloring), "Io sono come sono" (for tenor and piano), "Austerlitz" (for tenor and piano)
- "Antinoo", "Memory", "Il mondo di Carlos", "Il caso Ciaikovskij", "Margaret by Margaret"
- "I ponti della storia e della leggenda": Ponte Sublicio, Ponte Emilio, Ponte Milvio, Ponte Fabricio, Ponte Cestio e Ponte Elio, RAI, 2000
- "Lucio Dalla and Sorrento - The Places of the Soul", produced by GoldenGate Edizioni, 2015
- "Uno straccione, un clown" (A beggar, a clown), lyrics by Raffaele Lauro, music by Giuliano Cardella, Paolo Della Mora and Alberto Lucerna. Dedicated by Raffaele Lauro to Lucio Dalla, on the occasion of the fifth anniversary of the death of the great artist from Bologna (1 March 2012/1 March 2017), performed by the band "The Sputos"

Latest contributions

- "BBC. Ricordo di Violetta Elvin Prokhorova"
- "Il futuro dell'economia tra sostenibilità, cultura e turismo"
- "Un nuovo Medioevo sta avanzando. Il male oscuro del nichilismo"

=== Honours and awards ===
He was appointed, in 1990, 3rd Class Commander of the Order of Merit of the Italian Republic, and in 1992, 2nd Class Grand Officer of the Order of Merit of the Italian Republic (1992). He also received top honors from governments and foreign countries (Chile, Morocco).

In 2004, in Agrigento, he won the prestigious "Premio Empedocle", in memory of Paolo Borsellino, conferred by the Academy of Mediterranean Studies.

In 2005, the "Premio Personaggio Speciale 2005" by Confartigianato and, in 2006, together with the Maestro Lucio Dalla, the International Prize "Sorrento nel Mondo".

In 2015, in Manfredonia, he received the "International Award for Culture - Re Manfredi" for his merits in the field of culture and defence of the rule of law.

On 18 December 2015, with a special session, the City Council of San Martino Valle Caudina (AV), awarded him with honorary citizenship in recognition of the literary work, which enshrined the historic link between Lucio Dalla, Sorrento and San Martino Valle Caudina. He was also awarded, in December 2016, with the honorary citizenship of Meta, in Sorrento Peninsula.

During 2015/2016, he has realized the "Lucio Dalla and Sorrento Tour" in 21 stages, in Italy and abroad (in Sofia, under the patronage of the Presidency of the Republic), at prefectures, embassies, theatres, libraries and town halls, with 81 witnesses on Lucio Dalla’s bond with Sorrento, with Manfredonia and the South of Italy. The tour, which lasted a year, has been documented in a book, presented in Sorrento and Manfredonia, to mark the fourth anniversary of the Bolognese artist’s death (March the 1st 2012/March the 1st 2016).

On the fifth anniversary of Lucio Dalla’s death (1 March 2012/ 1 March 2017) he dedicated a song to the great Bolognese artist, entitled "A beggar, a clown".

Career Award "Sorrentine Peninsula Arturo Esposito 2019" for the narrative

National Award "Caravella Tricolore 2020", section "Music", for the biographical work on Lucio Dalla

Raffaele Lauro's political-institutional and literary biography has been published in English by "DA. Dante Alighieri Nottingham Society", among those of the major artists (poets, writers and composers), who inspired their work to Sorrento, such as Torquato Tasso, Mary Shelley, Henrik Ibsen, Marion Crawford, Maxim Gorky, Giovanbattista De Curtis and Lucio Dalla.
