= Osvaldo Napoli =

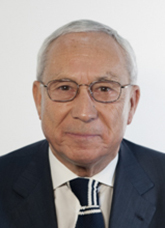

Member of the Chamber of Deputies
- In office 30 May 2001 – 14 March 2013
- In office 30 May 2001 – 14 March 2013

Personal details
- Born: 23 March 1944 (age 82) Turin, Italy
- Party: Christian Democracy (1975–94); Forza Italia (1994–2009); The People of Freedom (2009–2013); Forza Italia (2013–21); Coraggio Italia (2021–22); Action (2022–present)

Osvaldo Napoli (Turin, 23 March 1944) is an Italian politician.

== Political career ==
Osvaldo Napoli has been mayor of Giaveno from 1985 to 2004 and subsequently mayor of Valgioie from 2009 to 2016.

In the 1996 general election, he ran for the Pole for Freedoms in the Giaveno constituency, but was unsuccessful. He was elected to the Chamber of Deputies in the 2001 general election and held the seat until the 2013 general elections, when he was not re-elected.

Napoli ran for mayor the 2016 Turin municipal election, supported by Forza Italia, but scored only 5.31% of the vote.

In 2018, he was re-elected to the Chamber of Deputies among the ranks of Forza Italia. In 2021, he joined Cambiamo!, while in 2022, he finally joined Action.

In the 2022 general election he was a candidate among the ranks of Action – Italia Viva, but was not re-elected.
