= Giancarlo Pittelli =

Italian criminal, former lawyer

Giancarlo Pittelli is an Italian criminal and former lawyer and politician. Pittelli had served as a Deputy and Senator, and was convicted in November 2023 for collusion with a criminal organisation.
