= Antonio Martino =

Italian politician (1942–2022)

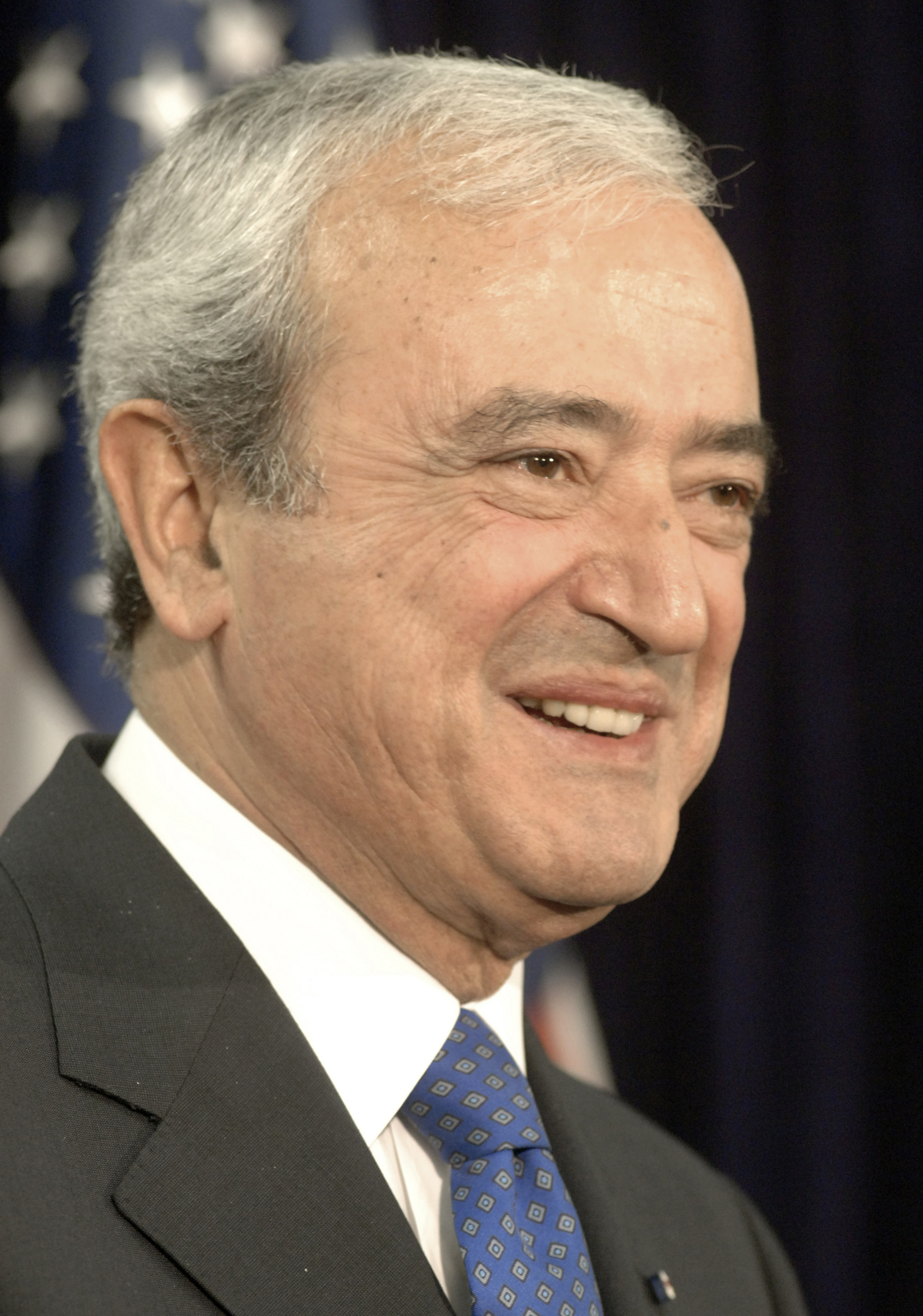
- Martino in July 2005

Minister of Defence
- In office 11 June 2001 – 17 May 2006
- Prime Minister: Silvio Berlusconi
- Preceded by: Sergio Mattarella
- Succeeded by: Arturo Parisi

Minister of Foreign Affairs
- In office 10 May 1994 – 17 January 1995
- Prime Minister: Silvio Berlusconi
- Preceded by: Leopoldo Elia
- Succeeded by: Susanna Agnelli

Member of the Chamber of Deputies
- In office 15 April 1994 – 22 March 2018
- Constituency: Sicily

Personal details
- Born: 22 December 1942 Messina, Kingdom of Italy
- Died: 5 March 2022 (aged 79) Rome, Italy
- Party: PLI (1968–1994); FI (1994–2009); PdL (2009–2013); FI (2013–2022)
- Spouse: Carol Erickson
- Parent: Gaetano Martino (father)
- Education: University of Messina; University of Chicago
- Profession: Professor, economist, journalist

Antonio Martino (22 December 1942 – 5 March 2022) was an Italian politician and economist who a deputy and minister during the early years of the Second Italian Republic. A founding member of Forza Italia (FI), he served as Minister of Foreign Affairs in 1994 and Minister of Defence from 2001 to 2006. Martino was the son of a prominent Italian Liberal Party (PLI) politician who served as foreign minister in the 1950s. He followed his father's politics and joined the PLI in 1968.

After graduating in Jurisprudence, Martino moved to the United States and became a professor. He was also a prolific writer and author, and wrote for numerous publications. From 1994 to 2018, he was a member of the Chamber of Deputies. First elected with Forza Italia, he was a founding member of The People of Freedom (PdL), which was Forza Italia's successor in 2009, and was part of Forza Italia's refoundation in 2013.

== Early life and education ==
Martino was born on 22 December 1942 in Messina. He was the son of Gaetano Martino (1900–1967), the Foreign Minister of Italy from 1954 to 1957 and prominent member of the PLI. Martino earned a J.D. in Jurisprudence from the University of Messina Law School in 1964, then went on to the University of Chicago for postgraduate studies in Economics from 1966 to 1968, where he was a student of Milton Friedman.

== Career ==
After graduation, Martino started his career as visiting professor at the Rome Center of Loyola University Chicago. After becoming a professor in 1976 Martino worked at the University of Messina, University of Bari, University of Naples and Sapienza University of Rome. He ran for the PLI secretary in the mid-1980s but was unsuccessful. A member of the Italian Parliament, Martino was first elected in 1994 and then re-elected in 1996 and 2001.

In 1992, Martino was made a professor of economics in the political science department at the LUISS University of Rome. He was the Adjunct Scholar at The Heritage Foundation from 1978 and an editorial board member of the Cato Journal from 1990. He wrote 11 books and over 150 papers and articles in the fields of economic theory and policy. He was a regular contributor to a variety of Italian and foreign periodicals and newspapers as well as Italian and international television and radio programmes. He worked as an editorial writer for a number of Italian newspapers (La Stampa, Il Sole 24 Ore, Mondo economico, L'Opinione, Il Giornale, Quotidiano Nazionale, Il Giorno, Il Resto del Carlino, and La Nazione), and his bi-line has appeared in international publications such as The Wall Street Journal, The Times, Le Figaro, Neue Zürcher Zeitung, The American Spectator, Economic Affairs, and others.

In 1988–1990, Martino was President of the Mont Pelerin Society. During the 1990s, he wrote Stato Padrone, a book in which he set out his free-market ideas. He was one of the founders of Silvio Berlusconi's political party Forza Italia. He was Minister of Foreign Affairs in the first Berlusconi government (1994–1995) and Minister of Defence in the second Berlusconi government (2001–2006).

In 2004, Martino was the main promoter for the suspending compulsory military service, already formally decided in 2001 but officially in 2007; consequently, the suspension came into effect indefinitely on 1 January 2005 (Martino Law), and also granted exemption to all those who had in the past obtained postponements of service on grounds such as study. Additionally, he backed the a speedier transformation of the armed forces into a body of professional volunteers. Martino was also the secretary of the Italy-USA Foundation's Scientific Committee. In 2005, he was awarded the Medal for Distinguished Public Service by the United States Department of Defense.

== Personal life and death ==
Martino was married and had two daughters. He died in Rome on 5 March 2022 at the age of 79.

Political offices
Preceded by Leopoldo Elia	Minister of Foreign Affairs; 1994–1995	Succeeded by Susanna Agnelli
Preceded by Sergio Mattarella	Minister of Defence; 2001–2006	Succeeded by Arturo Parisi
