= Giorgio Stracquadanio =

Italian politician (1959–2014)

Giorgio Clelio Stracquadanio

Member of the Chamber of Deputies
- In office 29 April 2008 – 14 March 2013

Member of the Senate
- In office 28 April 2006 – 28 April 2008

Personal details
- Born: 22 March 1959 Milan
- Died: 31 January 2014 (aged 54) Milan
- Party: PR (1980s-1989); FI (1996-2009); PdL (2009-2012); IL (2012-2013)
- Occupation: politician, journalist

Giorgio Clelio Stracquadanio (22 March 1959 – 31 January 2014) was an Italian politician and journalist.

== Biography ==
Born in Milan, Stracquadanio began his political career in the 1980s as an activist for the Radical Party in Milan with the municipal councillor Tiziana Maiolo.

In 1996 he ran unsuccessfully as an MP for Silvio Berlusconi's Polo delle Libertà.

In 2006 he was elected to the Italian Senate with Forza Italia. While still taking part in Forza Italia's activities, he joined the parliamentary group "Democrazia Cristiana per le Autonomie" to allow them to reach the minimum required quorum for group constitution. As a legislator he rejected a proposal for the diminishing of members of parliament's salaries and benefits.

In 2006 he was elected to be a member of the General Council of the Transnational Radical Party.

In the 2008 general elections, he was not elected but received the seat of Cristiana Muscardini who opted instead to serve in the European Parliament. He then sat with the People of Freedom in the Italian Chamber of Deputies.

Stracquadanio also worked as a journalist with the right-wing newspaper Libero, for which he edited some political pamphlets.

In 2009-2010, Stracquadanio was criticized for many controversial statements, including:

- the delegitimisation of dissent in Berlusconi's party, the opposition to the explicit choice of MPs by electors, the support to ad personam laws favouring Silvio Berlusconi
- insults towards a left-wing journalist during a press conference
- request to libel Gianfranco Fini to force his dismissal, as with Dino Boffo
- downplaying of 2009 L'Aquila earthquake
- legitimizing prostitution to gain access to public posts, and stating that if a female MP were discovered to have been selected in return for sexual favours, there would be no reason for her to resign, or even to feel embarrassed; he stated his position after Angela Napoli (MP of the same party) had remarked that she could not exclude the possibility that some women MPs and senators had been selected in this manner.

In July 2012 he left Berlusconi's party and in December of the same year joined the political project built by Mario Monti. Stracquadanio died of lung cancer on January 31, 2014 at the age of 54.
