= Forza Italia (1994) =

Former Italian political party

- Abbreviation: FI
- President: Silvio Berlusconi
- Vice President: Giulio Tremonti (2004–2009); Roberto Formigoni (2008–2009)
- Founder: Silvio Berlusconi
- Founded: 18 January 1994
- Dissolved: 27 March 2009
- Merged into: The People of Freedom
- Headquarters: Via dell'Umiltà 36, Rome
- Student wing: Students for the Freedoms
- Youth wing: Forza Italia – Young People for Freedom
- Membership (2007): 400,000
- Ideology: Liberal conservatism; Christian democracy; Populism
- Political position: Centre-right
- National affiliation: Pole of Freedoms/Pole of Good Government (1994); Pole for Freedoms (1996–2001); House of Freedoms (2001–2008)
- European affiliation: European People's Party (1999–2009)
- European Parliament group: Forza Europa (1994–1995); Union for Europe (1995–1998); EPP–ED (1998–2009)
- Colours: Azure
- Anthem: "Forza Italia"

Forza Italia (Note: The name is not usually translated into English: forza is the second-person singular imperative of forzare, in this case translating to "compel" or "press", and so means something like "Forward, Italy", "Come on, Italy" or "Go, Italy!". Forza Italia! was used as a sport slogan, and was also the slogan of Christian Democracy in the 1987 Italian general election (Giovanni Baccarin, Che fine ha fatto la DC?, Padova: Gregoriana, 2000). See article body for further details.) (FI; lit. 'Forward Italy' or 'Come on Italy' or 'Let's Go Italy') was a centre-right political party in Italy founded by Silvio Berlusconi, who served as Prime Minister of Italy four times. Politically liberal-conservative, it also had Christian democratic, liberal, economic liberalism, social democratic, and populist tendencies.

The party was founded in December 1993 and won its first general election soon afterwards in March 1994. It was the main member of the Pole of Freedoms/Pole of Good Government, Pole for Freedoms, and House of Freedoms coalitions. Throughout its existence, the party was characterised by a strong reliance on the personal image and charisma of its leader (it has been called a "personality party", or Berlusconi's "personal party"), and the skillful use of media campaigns, especially via television. The party's organisation and ideology depended heavily on its leader, so much so that its appeal to voters was based on Berlusconi's personality more than on its ideology or programme.

In November 2008, the national council of the party, presided by Alfredo Biondi, voted to merge Forza Italia into The People of Freedom (PdL), Berlusconi's new political vehicle, whose official foundation took place in March 2009. A new Forza Italia was established by Berlusconi as PdL's legal successor in 2013.

== History ==
=== Foundation (1993–1994) ===
Forza Italia was formed in 1993 by Silvio Berlusconi, a successful businessman and owner of four of the main private television stations in Italy, along with Antonio Martino, Mario Valducci, Antonio Tajani, Marcello Dell'Utri, Cesare Previti and Giuliano Urbani. Italy was shaken by a series of corruption scandals known as Tangentopoli and the subsequent police investigation, called Mani pulite. This led to the disappearance of the five parties that had governed the First Italian Republic since 1947: Christian Democracy (DC), the Italian Socialist Party (PSI), the Italian Democratic Socialist Party (PSDI), the Italian Liberal Party (PLI), and the Italian Republican Party (PR), which formed a successful five-party coalition called Pentapartito from 1983 to 1991, and then governed without PRI from 1991 to 1994. Forza Italia's aim was to attract moderate voters who were "disoriented, political orphans and who risked being unrepresented" (as Berlusconi described them), especially if the Democratic Party of the Left (PDS), the direct heirs of the Italian Communist Party (PCI), had been able to win the next election and enter in government for the first time since 1947. Despite taking the place of the DC as the party for former centrist and centre-right DC voters, Forza Italia was not initially lined to the European People's Party (EPP).

The establishment of Forza Italia was supported in terms of finance, personnel, and logistics by Berlusconi's Fininvest corporation. The area managers of its advertisement branch Publitalia '80 (managed by Dell'Utri) organised the selection of FI candidates, its marketing network staffed the opinion research centre Diakron that surveyed the "market potential" of the new party and the financial intermediaries of Fininvest subsidiary Programma Italia encouraged the launch of Forza Italia clubs. The new party's campaigning was strongly dependent on Fininvest's TV stations and PR resources. This earned Forza Italia labels like "virtual", "plastic", or "business-firm party".

In her 2001 study of the party, political scientist Emanuela Poli described Forza Italia as "a mere diversification of Fininvest in the political market". The case of Forza Italia was unprecedented as never before had a large political party been launched by a business corporation. Only slowly it transformed into a mass-membership organisation. It took four years until the first party congress was held. To extend its representation in different regions, FI often recruited established politicians of the "old" parties, mainly DC and PSI, who defected to the new party, bringing their local clientele with them.

FI's political programme was strongly influenced by the manifesto "In Search of Good Government" (Alla ricerca del buongoverno) authored in late 1993 by Giuliano Urbani who was then a political science professor at Milan's private Bocconi University and an occasional collaborator of Fininvest. It denounced corruption, dominance of political parties and remnants of communism as Italy's ills, while advocating market economy, the assertion of civil society and more efficient politics as the solutions. In a couple of months Forza Italia became one of the leading Italian parties, achieving a large consensus through an accurate strategy of communication and pounding electoral spots aired by the Mediaset TV channels.

=== A short stint in power (1994–1995) ===
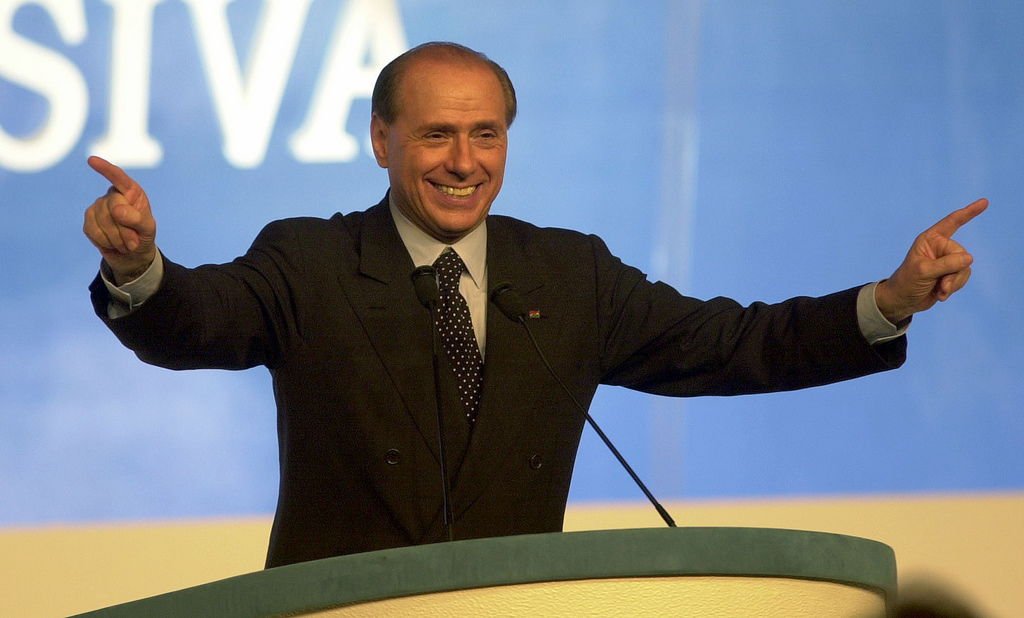
Berlusconi during a Forza Italia rally in 1994

A few months after its creation, Forza Italia came to national power after the 1994 Italian general election as the head of a political coalition called Pole of Freedoms/Pole of Good Government, composed of Lega Nord, National Alliance, Christian Democratic Centre and Union of the Centre. Silvio Berlusconi was sworn in May 1994 as Prime Minister of Italy in a government in which the most important cabinet posts were held by fellow Forza Italia members: Antonio Martino was Foreign Minister, Cesare Previti Defence Minister, Alfredo Biondi Justice Minister and Giulio Tremonti (at the time an independent member of Parliament) Finance Minister.

In the 1994 European Parliament election in Italy held in June, Forza Italia was placed first nationally, with 30.6% of the vote, electing 27 MEPs. The party did not join an existing group in the European Parliament, instead forming the new group Forza Europa, composed entirely of Forza Italia MEPs. The first Berlusconi-led government had a short life and fell in December, when Lega Nord left the coalition, after disagreements over pension reform and the first avviso di garanzia (preliminary notice of an investigation) for Berlusconi, passed by Milan prosecutors. Forza Italia's leader was replaced as prime minister by Lamberto Dini, an independent politician who had been the administration's Treasury Minister. No members of Forza Italia joined the new government and the party leader was relegated to opposition. However, the party obtained substantial successes in the 1995 Italian regional elections, both in the North (winning in Piedmont, Lombardy, and Veneto) and the South (Campania, Apulia, and Calabria).

=== Five years of opposition (1996–2001) ===
The Pole for Freedoms coalition led by Forza Italia lost the 1996 Italian general election and began what Berlusconi called "the crossing of the desert", something that could have proved fatal for such a young and unstructured party. Between 1996 and 1998, the party started to strengthen its organisation under Claudio Scajola, a former Christian Democrat who served as national coordinator of Forza Italia from 1996 to 2001. In December 1999, Forza Italia gained full membership in the European People's Party, of which Antonio Tajani, the party leader of Forza Italia in the European Parliament, became a vice president. In the same year, the party scored well (25.2% of votes) in the 1999 European Parliament election in Italy.

In the Italian regional elections of 2000, the Pole for Freedoms, with the support of Lega Nord, won in eight out of fifteen regions (all the most populous ones, except for Campania), while three members of Forza Italia were re-elected as presidents of the Region in Piedmont (Enzo Ghigo), Lombardy (Roberto Formigoni), and Veneto (Giancarlo Galan), together with three more elected for the first time in Liguria (Sandro Biasotti), Apulia (Raffaele Fitto) and Calabria (Giuseppe Chiaravalloti). The party regained power in the 2001 Italian general election, gaining 29.4% of the votes with Giorgio La Malfa's tiny Italian Republican Party, in a new coalition called House of Freedoms (CdL) and composed mainly of the National Alliance, Lega Nord, Christian Democratic Centre and United Christian Democrats (the last two parties merged in 2002 to form the Union of Christian and Centre Democrats, UDC).

=== Five years in government (2001–2006) ===
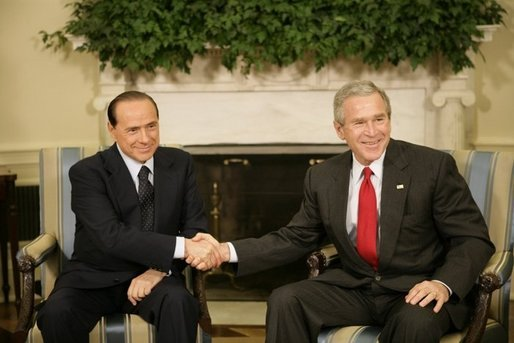
Silvio Berlusconi with U.S. President George W. Bush in 2005

In June 2001, after the success in May elections, Berlusconi was returned head of the Italian government, the longest-serving cabinet in the history of the Italian republic. Again all key ministerial posts were given to Forza Italia members: Interior (Claudio Scajola 2001–2002, Giuseppe Pisanu 2002–2006), Defence (Antonio Martino 2001–2006), Finance (Giulio Tremonti, 2001–2004 and 2005–2006), Industry (Antonio Marzano 2001–2005, Claudio Scajola 2005–2006), and Foreign Affairs (Franco Frattini, 2002–2004). Additionally, National Alliance leader Gianfranco Fini was appointed deputy prime minister and foreign minister from 2004 to 2006, while Roberto Castelli, senior figure of Lega Nord was Justice Minister from 2001 to 2006.

In 2004 European elections, Forza Italia was second place nationally, receiving 20.1% of the vote and returning 16 MEPs. In national office, the second Berlusconi government's popularity kept declining steadily year after year. Regional elections in April 2005 were a serious blow for the party, which remained strong in the northern regions, such as Lombardy and Veneto, and somewhere in the South, where Sicily was a stronghold. After this disappointing electoral performance the cabinet was reshuffled, due to the insistence of the Union of Christian and Centre Democrats's leaders, and Berlusconi formed a new cabinet, known as the third Berlusconi government

During his five years in office, Berlusconi government passed a series of reforms: a pension system reform, a labour market reform, a judiciary reform and a constitutional reform – the latter rejected by a referendum in June 2006. In foreign policy he shifted the country's position to more closeness to the United States, while in economic policy he was not able to deliver the tax cuts he had openly promised throughout all 2001 electoral campaign.

=== Toward The People of Freedom (2006–2009) ===
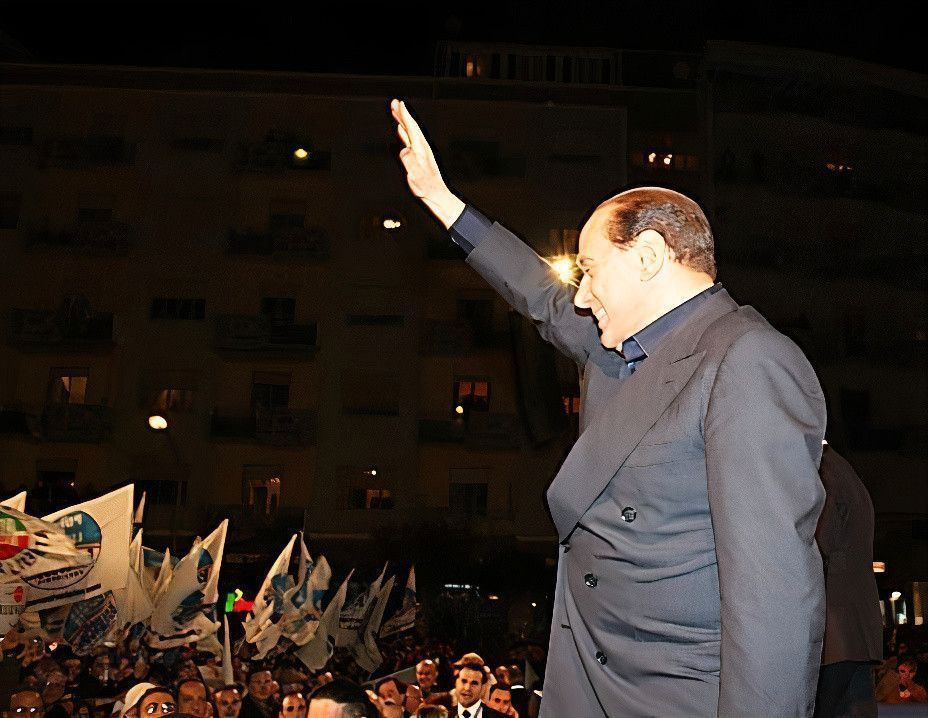
Berlusconi during a rally in 2008

In the 2006 Italian general election, Forza Italia was present with a slightly different logo, with the words "Berlusconi President" (Berlusconi Presidente). It was the only party to use the word "President" in its logo. In the election for the Chamber of Deputies, FI scored 23.7% and 137 seats, in those for the Senate of the Republic 24.0%, without counting Trentino-Alto Adige, whose seats were contested on first-past-the-post basis and which is a left-wing stronghold, due to its alliance with the autonomist South Tyrolean People's Party). The incumbent Berlusconi-led government narrowly lost to The Union coalition, which returned Romano Prodi as prime minister, relegating Forza Italia and its House of Freedoms allies to opposition.

On 31 July 2007 Berlusconi's protegee and possible successor Michela Vittoria Brambilla registered the name and the logo of the "Freedom Party" (Partito della Libertà) apparently with Berlusconi's backing. On 18 November, after Forza Italia claimed to have collected the signatures of more than 7 million Italians (including Umberto Bossi) against Romano Prodi's second government to ask the President of the Republic Giorgio Napolitano to call a fresh election, Berlusconi announced that Forza Italia would have soon merged or transformed into The People of Freedom (PdL) party.

After the sudden fall of the second Prodi government on 24 January 2008, the break-up of The Union coalition, and the subsequent political crisis paving the way towards a new general election, Berlusconi hinted on 25 January that Forza Italia would have probably contested its final election and the new party would have been officially founded after that election. In an atmosphere of reconciliation with Gianfranco Fini, Berlusconi also stated that the new party could have seen the participation of other parties. Finally, on 8 February, Berlusconi and Fini agreed to form a joint list under the banner of "The People of Freedom", allied with Lega Nord. In the 2008 Italian general election the PdL won 37.4% and a majority in both chambers, thanks to the alliance with Lega Nord (8.3%). Soon after the election Berlusconi formed his fourth government. On 21 November 2008, the national council of the party, presided over by Alfredo Biondi and attended by Berlusconi himself, officially decided the dissolution of Forza Italia into The People of Freedom (PdL), whose official foundation took place on 27 March 2009.

=== Revival (2013) ===
In June 2013 Berlusconi announced the upcoming revival of Forza Italia, and the transformation of the People of Freedom into a centre-right coalition. The new Forza Italia was launched on 18 September 2013, and the PdL was dissolved into the new party on 16 November 2013.

== Ideology ==
Forza Italia was a centre-right party, formed mainly by former members of the DC, the PSI, and the PLI. The ideology of the party ranged from libertarianism to social democracy (often referred to as "liberal socialism" in Italy), including elements of the Catholic social teaching and the social market economy. The party was a member of the EPP and presented itself as the party of renewal and modernization. The core values of Forza Italia were "freedom" and the "centrality of the individual". From a comparative perspective the ideology of Forza Italia has been characterized as liberal conservative, or conservative liberal, national conservative, and liberal. The party has also been described as populist, or right-wing populist, in particular "neoliberal populist".

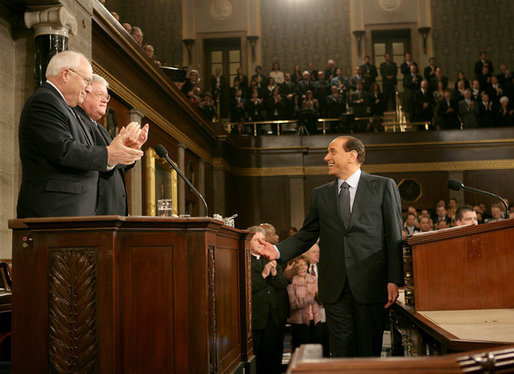
Berlusconi addressing a joint session of the U.S. Congress in 2006

Alessandro Campi has written that "the political culture of Forza Italia – a curious and, on many respects, untold mixture of 'liberalism' and 'democratic populism' – deserves to be described as an 'anti-ideological ideology', ... as a synthesis or fusion of very diverse political families and traditions (from liberal Catholicism to social conservatism, from reformist socialism to economic liberalism), kept together by the mobilizing appeal to 'freedom'." Chiara Moroni, who explains Forza Italia's ideology as a mixture of liberal, Christian-democratic and social-democratic values (united in the concept of "popular liberalism" in party documents), wrote that "Berlusconi offered to voters liberal values through a populist style" and that "Forza Italia has made the liberal political ideal popular" among voters, so that "it was spread and shared by broad and heterogenous sectors of the Italian population".

The electoral base of Forza Italia was highly heterogeneous and the ideological differences among its voters are explained also by its different regional constituencies; while voters from the North tended to support the original libertarian line of the party, voters from the South tended to be more statist. Both its Northern strongholds (Lombardy and Veneto) and its Southern strongholds (Sicily and Apulia) were once dominated by the DC; while in the South most leading members of Forza Italia were former DC members, the party was highly influenced also by liberals in the North.

Forza Italia claimed to be a fresh new party, with no ties with the last governments of the First Republic, and at the same time to be the heir of the best political traditions of Italy: Alcide De Gasperi (DC), Giuseppe Saragat (PSDI), Luigi Einaudi (PLI), and Ugo La Malfa (PRI) were considered as party icons. The "Secular Creed", which was also the preamble to the party's constitution, described the party in this way:

Forza Italia is a liberal party although not an elitist one, indeed a popular liberal-democratic party; it is a Catholic party although not a confessional one; it is a secular party, although not an intolerant and secularist one; it is a national party, although not a centralist one.

Forza Italia presented itself as a bridge between Catholics and non-Catholics, who have been previously divided in the political system of the First Republic, and "the union of three political-cultural areas: that of liberal and popular Catholicism, that of secular, liberal and republican humanism and that of liberal socialism". In a speech during a party congress in 1998, Berlusconi himself proclaimed: "our liberal vision of the State is perfectly in agreement with the Catholic social teaching". The "Secular Creed" of the party explains that Forza Italia was a party that primarily underlined the centrality of the individual and freedom, which are respectively basic principles of the Catholic social teaching and liberalism, as well as the Catholic social teaching, often connected in party official documents.

We believe in freedom, in all its several and vital forms: in the freedom of thought, in the freedom of expression, in religious freedom, of every religion, in the freedom of association. ... Freedom is not graciously conceded by the State, because it comes before it. It is a natural right, which belongs to us as we are human beings and it itself rather lays the foundations of the state. ... We believe that the state should be at the service of citizens, and not citizens at the service of the state. We believe that the state should be the servant of the citizen and not the citizen the servant of the state. The citizen is sovereign. For this, we believe concretely in the individual ... . We believe in the values of our Christian tradition, in the life values which cannot be renounced, in common good, in freedom of education and learning, in peace, in solidarity, in justice, in tolerance ... .

In 2008, Berlusconi stated:

We want a social market economy. A democracy cannot afford citizens in poor conditions. With our book on welfare we tackle the needs of the weakest families. It is decidedly a left-wing policy. This government which centrist, liberal, with Catholics and reformists, intends to advance with policies that the left-wing promises by word of mouth.

Sandro Bondi, a leading member of the party, wrote:

Forza Italia considers liberal classics as Croce, Sturzo, Hayek and Einaudi as reference authors. In particular, it hark back to the social market economy of Röpke, which was conceived in reference to the traditional social teaching of the Church. Forza Italia has imparted a deep cultural innovation, combining the language of the Church tradition with the liberal and reformist thought.

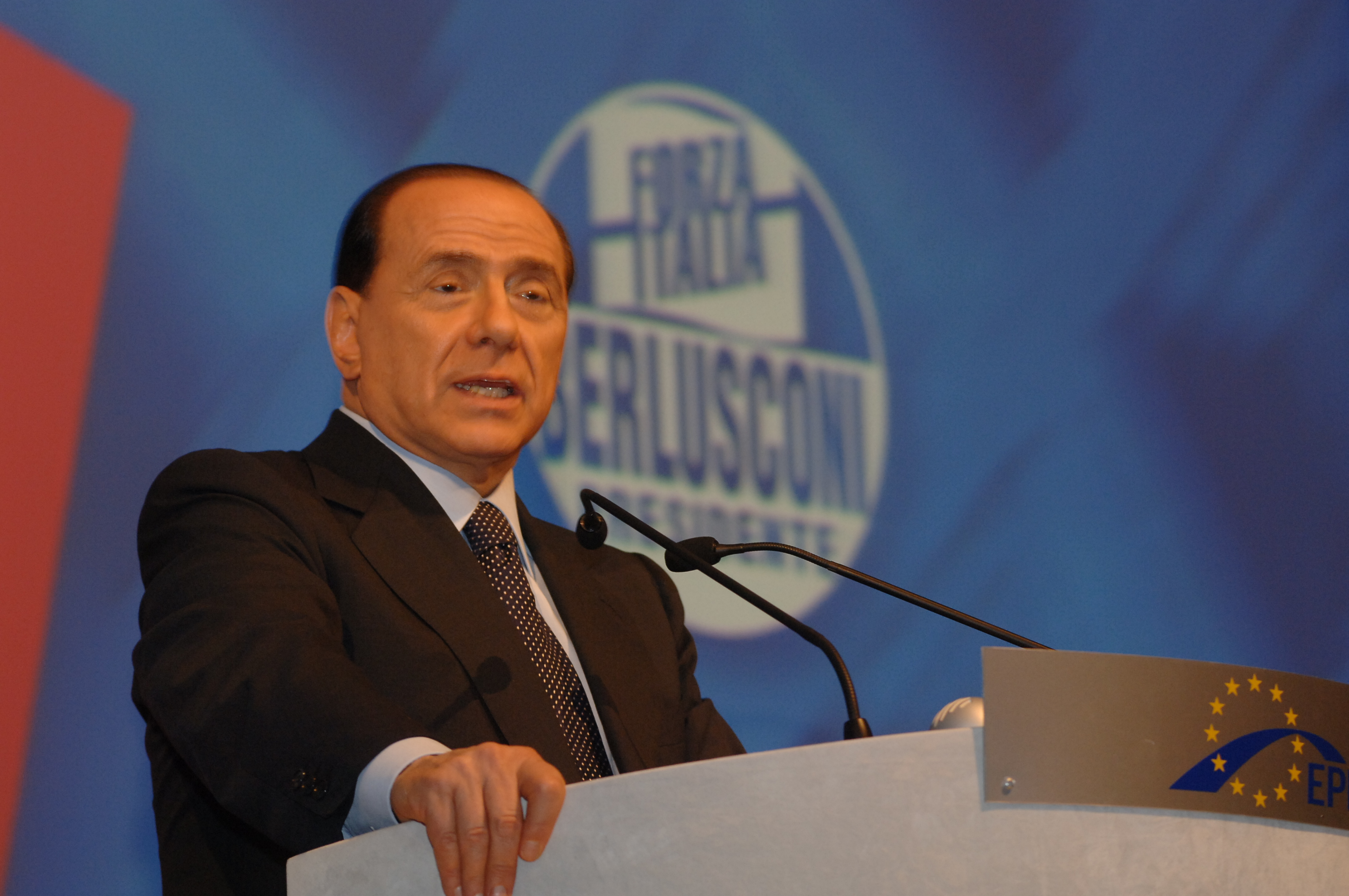
Berlusconi during a European People's Party meeting

The party included a minority of non-Catholic members, and it was less secular in its policies than Christian Democratic Union of Germany. The party usually gave to its members freedom of conscience on moral issues (and hence a free vote), as in the case of the referendum on stem-cell research, but leading members of the party, including Berlusconi, Giulio Tremonti, and Marcello Pera, who was himself non-Catholic but friend of Pope Benedict XVI), spoke in favour of "abstention" (as asked by the Catholic Church, to not surpass the 50% of turnout needed for making the referendum legally binding). While Pera campaigned hard for the success of the boycott along with most FI members, both Berlusconi and Tremonti explicitly said that "abstention" was their personal opinion, not the official one of the party.

The political scientist Giovanni Orsina has defined Berlusconism, as he terms the ideology of Forza Italia and its leader, as an "emulsion of populism and liberalism", more specifically right-liberalism. According to him, in the initial phase, both elements were represented about equally, only after 2000 pro-market liberal positions had receded in favour of more socially conservative ones. As the main ideologic themes of Berlusconism, Orsina identified the myth of the "good" civil society (as opposed to the state apparatus), a "friendly, minimal state" (providing services to citizens rather than regulating their lives), "hypopolitics" (i.e. the containment of political conflicts, after the hyper-politisation of Italian society during the "First Republic") and the identification of a "new virtuous elite". The concepts of a good civil society and hypopolitics were both liberal and populist; while the minimal state was a mainly liberal idea and the new virtuous elite a chiefly populist one. According to Orsina, Berlusconism sanctified "the people" that embodied all virtues while being "betrayed" by the (old) elites, a typical element of populist ideologies. However, Berlusconi viewed "the people" as a pluralistic and diverse collection of individuals, not an ethnically, historically and culturally homogeneous unit.

== Members ==
Most members of the party were former Christian Democrats (DC): Giuseppe Pisanu (former member of the leftist faction of DC and Minister of Interior), Roberto Formigoni (President of Lombardy), Claudio Scajola (former Minister of the Interior and of Industry), Enrico La Loggia, Renato Schifani, Guido Crosetto, Raffaele Fitto, Giuseppe Gargani, Alfredo Antoniozzi, Giorgio Carollo, Giuseppe Castiglione, Francesco Giro, Luigi Grillo, Maurizio Lupi, Mario Mantovani, Mario Mauro, Osvaldo Napoli, Antonio Palmieri, Angelo Sanza, Riccardo Ventre, and Marcello Vernola are only some remarkable examples.

Several members were former Socialists (PSI), as Giulio Tremonti (vice-president of the party and former Minister of Economy), Franco Frattini (Vice President of the European Commission), Fabrizio Cicchitto (national deputy-coordinator of the party), Renato Brunetta, Francesco Musotto, Amalia Sartori, Paolo Guzzanti, and Margherita Boniver. Berlusconi himself was a close friend of Bettino Craxi, leader of the PSI, in spite of his own DC and PLI background (Berlusconi was a DC activist in occasion of the pivotal 1948 Italian general election).

Many were former members of the PLI, PRI, and PSDI: Alfredo Biondi (president of Forza Italia's national council) and Raffaele Costa, both former PLI leaders, and former PSDI leader Carlo Vizzini were later MPs for Forza Italia. Moreover, Antonio Martino and Giancarlo Galan were formers PLI members, Jas Gawronski was a leading PRI member, and Marcello Pera had a PSI and Radical Party (PR) background. Even some former PCI members were leading members of the party, such as national party coordinator Sandro Bondi and Ferdinando Adornato.

== Factions ==
Members of Forza Italia were divided in factions, which were sometimes mutable and formed over the most important political issues, despite previous party allegiances; however, it is possible to distinguish some patterns. The party was divided over ethical (between social conservatives and progressives), economic (between social democrats and some Christian democrats on one side and liberals on the other one), and institutional issues. Regarding the latter issue, generally speaking, northern party members were staunch proposers of political and fiscal federalism, and autonomy for the Regions (in some parts of Veneto and Lombardy, it was sometimes difficult to distinguish a member of FI from a member of the LN), while those coming from the South were more cold on the issue. Also some former Liberals, due to their role of unifiers of Italy in the 19th century, were more centralist.

A scheme of the internal factions within Forza Italia could be this:

- Liberals. Supporters of free markets, deregulation, economic freedoms, civil rights, and in general personal responsibility and freedom. This group was basically formed by two wings: classical liberals (former members of the PLI, most of them organised in Popular Liberalism, as Alfredo Biondi, Raffaele Costa, Egidio Sterpa and Enrico Nan); former PSI members, as Renato Brunetta and Paolo Guzzanti; others like Stefania Prestigiacomo and Simone Baldelli) and libertarians, as Antonio Martino (ex-PLI), Dario Rivolta, and Benedetto Della Vedova (ex-PR member) and his Liberal Reformers. The latter were more staunchly pro-United States than the former and supported the idea of transforming Italy into a federal state.
- Liberal-centrists. They were more moderate than Martino and Della Vedova on economic issues, and more socially conservative on ethical issues, although not being totally sided with the Catholic Church. To this broad group belonged people of various origin: former PSI members (as Giulio Tremonti, Franco Frattini, Giampiero Cantoni, Amalia Sartori, and Jole Santelli), former PRI members (as Luigi Casero, Denis Verdini and Donato Bruno), former PLI members (as Giancarlo Galan, Giuseppe Vegas, and Paolo Romani), some former liberal DC members (Giuseppe Cossiga and Basilio Germanà), and many others (as Giorgio Jannone, Antonio Leone, Gianfranco Micciché, and Aldo Brancher). They were strong in Northern Italy and strong supporters of political and fiscal federalism.
- Christian democrats. They believed in the social market economy model and were supporters of Catholic stances over ethical issues. Most former members of the DC were identifiable with this tendency (from Roberto Formigoni to Giuseppe Pisanu, from Claudio Scajola to Enrico La Loggia, from Guido Crosetto to Angelo Sanza, from Maurizio Lupi to Giuseppe Gargani, and from Antonio Palmieri to Mario Mantovani), but also former PCI members, such as Sandro Bondi and Fernando Adornato, and former PSI members as Gianni Baget Bozzo, a Catholic priest who was in charge of cultural formation, fitted the category, along with former PLI members, as Isabella Bertolini. Some were more socially conservative than others (for example Formigoni and theoconservatives like Marcello Pera), and many of them were close to Tremonti; this group and the liberal-centrists were close on most political issues, so that the two factions were often undistinguishable. They were the most pro-European wing of the party, along with former PSI members, and many of them were also strongly Atlanticists, as Adornato and Pera. In 2007, Adornato, Pisanu, and Formigoni launched a faction named Liberal-Popular Union; the faction soon was disbanded as Adornato left Forza Italia to join the Union of the Centre. Formigoni had also his own group, Network Italy, mainly composed of Catholics active in Communion and Liberation, to which group both Crosetto and Fitto showed closeness.
- Social democrats. The most progressive wing of the party, especially about ethical issues. They were former PSI members, as Fabrizio Cicchitto, Francesco Colucci, Maurizio Sacconi, Margherita Boniver, Giorgio Stracquadanio, Chiara Moroni, and Stefania Craxi, or former PSDI members, as Carlo Vizzini, Nicola Cosentino and Paolo Russo. They considered themselves the true heirs of Pietro Nenni, Giuseppe Saragat, and Bettino Craxi, continued to declare themselves "socialists" and were sided with Silvio Berlusconi's centre-right because they saw the Italian centre-left as too hegemonised by the PDS, heir of the PCI, which was the main left-wing rival of the PSI from the 1950s to the 1990s. Forza Italia's social democrats were organised into four sub-factions: We Blue Reformers, Free Foundation, Young Italy, and the Clubs of Reformist Initiative.

Christian democrats and liberal-centrists were the strongest factions within the party; however, all four were mainstream for a special issue. For example, liberals and liberal-centrists were highly influential over economic policy, Christian democrats led the party over ethical issues (although there was a substantial minority promoting a more progressive outlook), and social democrats had their say in defining the party's policy over labour market reform. Moreover, it was thanks to social democrats and to those around Tremonti that constitutional reform was at the top of Forza Italia's political agenda. While Berlusconi was not part of any particular wing, his political record was a synthesis of all the political tendencies within the party.

== Internal structure ==
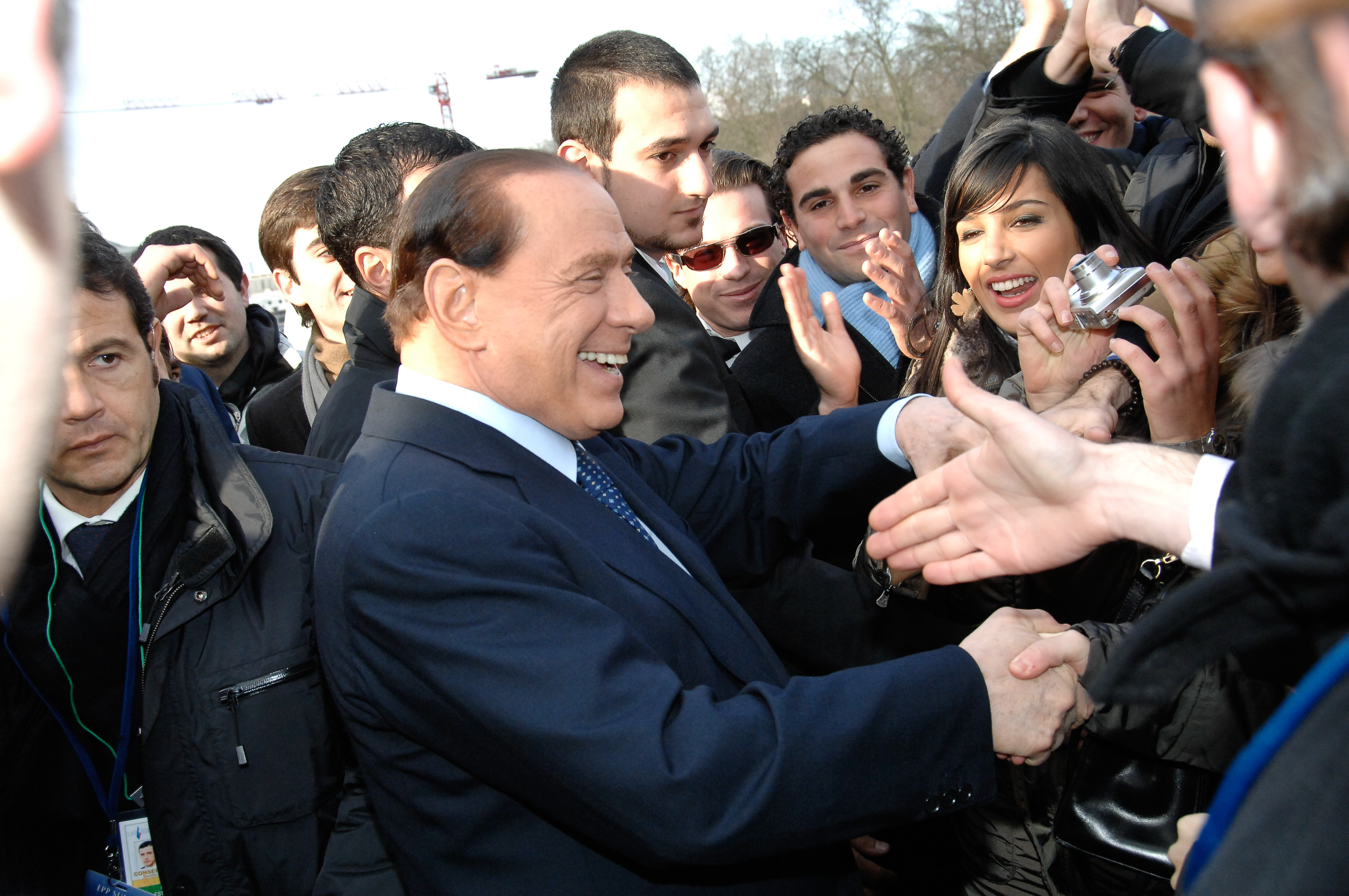
Silvio Berlusconi shaking hands

Before being merged into the PdL, Forza Italia had a president (currently Silvio Berlusconi), two vice-presidents (Giulio Tremonti and Roberto Formigoni), a presidential committee (presided by Claudio Scajola) and a national council (presided by Alfredo Biondi). The president was the party's leader, but a national coordinator was in charge of internal organisation and day-to-day political activity, similarly to the secretary-general in many European parties. Moreover, the party had thematic departments and regional, provincial or metropolitan coordination boards plus many affiliate clubs (Club Azzurro) all over Italy. Forza Italia was considered a prototypical example of the business-firm party, in that it was strongly centered on Berlusconi, who had created the party to further his own private interests.

Critics argued that Forza Italia had no internal democracy because there was no way of changing the leader of the party from below, although the party's constitution made it possible. Key posts in the party structure were appointed by Berlusconi or by his delegates. Forza Italia's organisation was based on the idea of a "party of the elected people", giving more importance to the whole electorate than to party's members. Party national-level conventions did not have normally elections to choose the party leadership (although the national congress elected some members of the national council), and they seemed to be more like events arranged for propaganda purposes; however, Berlusconi was highly popular among his party fellows, and it was unlikely he could have been overthrown if such an election had occurred.

Within the party there was a long debate over organisation. The original idea was the "light party" (partito leggero), intended to be different from Italian traditional, bureaucratic and self-referential, party machines. This was the line of the early founders of the party, notably Marcello Dell'Utri and Antonio Martino; however, Claudio Scajola and most former DC members supported a more capillary-based organisation, to make participate as much people as possible, and a more collegial, participative and democratic decision-making process. In a 1999 study, political scientists Jonathan Hopkin and Caterina Paolucci likened the organisational model of the party to that of a business firm, describing it as having "a lightweight organisation with the sole basic function of mobilising short-term support at election time". Several other authors have adopted this comparison, and have labeled Berlusconi as a "political entrepreneur".

Given the perceived use of government responsibility to advance Berlusconi's personal and Fininvest's business interests during the period of Forza Italia-led government, the political scientist Patrick McCarthy in 1995 proposed to describe Forza Italia as a "clan" rather than a reform-minded political party. In 2004, ten years after the emergence of the party and during its second term in government, Mark Donovan summarised that this still might be an accurate description. He asserted that the party (and the centre-right camp) was only coherent and disciplined when it came to questions that strongly concerned Berlusconi, while he allowed great liberties to the diverse factions in other issues that did not concern his personal interests.

== Distinctive traits ==
From its inception, Forza Italia used unconventional means in regards to European politics. Forza Italia's methods more closely resembled the American model, and utilized methods such as: stickering, SMS messaging, and mass-mailing of campaign material. This additionally included the widespread distribution of Berlusconi's biography, which was titled "An Italian Story" (Una storia italiana). The party was heavily dependent on the image surrounding Berlusconi's personality. The party's anthem was sung in karaoke fashion at American-style conventions. There was nominally no internal opposition (although some critical voices raised up, such as those of Senators Paolo Guzzanti and Raffaele Iannuzzi). The party used TV advertising extensively, although this was slightly restricted following 2000 by a law passed by the centre-left majority of the time.

== European affiliation ==
Following its first European election in 1994, Forza Italia MEPs formed their own political group in the European Parliament called Forza Europa. In 1995, Forza Europa merged with the European Democratic Alliance to form the Union for Europe group alongside the Rally for the Republic of France and Fianna Fáil of Ireland. Following an abandoned attempt to form a European political party with Rally for the Republic in 1997, Forza Italia was accepted into the Group of the European People's Party on 10 June 1998. In December 1999, Forza Italia was finally granted full membership of the EPP.

== Popular support ==
The electoral results of Forza Italia in general (Chamber of Deputies) and European Parliament elections since 1994 are shown in the chart below.

View source data.

The electoral results of Forza Italia in the 10 most populated regions of Italy are shown in the table below.

	1994 general	1995 regional	1996 general	1999 European	2000 regional	2001 general	2004 European	2005 regional	2006 general
Piedmont	26.5	26.7	21.7	28.8	30.8	32.0	22.2	22.4	23.5
Lombardy	26.0	29.2	23.6	30.5	33.9	32.3	25.7	26.0	27.1
Veneto	23.7	24.0	17.1	26.0	30.4	32.0	24.6	22.7	24.5
Emilia-Romagna	16.5	18.2	15.1	20.4	21.2	23.8	19.8	18.2	18.6
Tuscany	16.4	19.1	14.3	19.5	20.3	21.7	17.8	17.2	16.9
Lazio	20.5	18.9	16.1	20.6	21.5	26.4	17.5	15.4	21.4
Campania	19.9	18.9	23.4	25.2	20.9	33.8	19.5	11.9	27.2
Apulia	(Note: Forza Italia failed to present a list.)	20.7	24.6	28.0	28.7	30.1	20.4	26.8 (Note: Combined result of Forza Italia (17.8%) and La Puglia prima di tutto (9.0%), personal list of FI regional leader Raffaele Fitto)	27.3
Calabria	19.0	19.7	18.3	21.4	18.3	25.7	13.0	10.0	20.7
Sicily	33.6	17.1 (1996)	32.2	26.8	25.1 (2001)	36.7	21.5	19.2 (2006)	29.1

== Electoral results ==
=== Italian Parliament ===
Chamber of Deputies
Election year	Votes	%	Seats	+/−	Leader
1994	8,138,781 (1st)	21.0	113 / 630	–	Silvio Berlusconi
1996	7,712,149 (2nd)	20.6	122 / 630	▲9	Silvio Berlusconi
2001	10,923,431 (1st)	29.4	178 / 630	▲56	Silvio Berlusconi
2006	9,045,384 (2nd)	23.6	140 / 630	▼38	Silvio Berlusconi

Senate of the Republic
Election year	Votes	%	Seats	+/−	Leader
1994	with PdL/PBG	–	36 / 315	–	Silvio Berlusconi
1996	with PpL	–	48 / 315	▲12	Silvio Berlusconi
2001	with CdL	–	82 / 315	▲34	Silvio Berlusconi
2006	9,048,976 (2nd)	23.7	79 / 315	▼3	Silvio Berlusconi

=== European Parliament ===
European Parliament
Election year	Votes	%	Seats	+/−	Leader
1994	10,809,139 (1st)	30.6	27 / 87	–	Silvio Berlusconi
1999	7,913,948 (1st)	25.2	22 / 87	▼5	Silvio Berlusconi
2004	6,806,245 (2nd)	20.9	16 / 78	▼6	Silvio Berlusconi

== Leadership ==
- President: Silvio Berlusconi (1994–2009)
  - Vice President: Giulio Tremonti (2004–2009), Roberto Formigoni (2008–2009)
  - Spokesperson: Antonio Tajani (1994–1996), Paolo Bonaiuti (1996–2001), Sandro Bondi (2001–2004), Elisabetta Gardini (2004–2008), Daniele Capezzone (2008–2009)
- President of the President's Committee: Claudio Scajola (2004–2009)
  - Vice President of the President's Committee: Carlo Vizzini (2005–2009)
- President of the National Council: Alfredo Biondi (2004–2009)
- Coordinator: Domenico Mennitti (1994), Luigi Caligaris (1994), Cesare Previti (1994–1996), Claudio Scajola (1996–2001), Roberto Antonione (2001–2003), Claudio Scajola (2003), Sandro Bondi (2003–2008), Denis Verdini (2008–2009)
  - Deputy-Coordinator: Giuliano Urbani / Mario Valducci (1995–1996), Fabrizio Cicchitto (2003–2009), Gianfranco Micciché (2004–2009), Renato Brunetta (2007–2009), Gian Carlo Abelli (2008–2009)
- Treasurer: Mario Valducci (1994–1995), Domenico Lo Jucco (1995–1997), Giovanni Dell'Elce (1997–2003), Rocco Crimi (2003–2009)
- Party Leader in the Chamber of Deputies: Raffaele Della Valle (1994), Vittorio Dotti (1994–1996), Giuseppe Pisanu (1996–2001), Elio Vito (2001–2008), Fabrizio Cicchitto (leader of PdL's group, 2008–2009)
- Party Leader in the Senate: Enrico La Loggia (1994–2001), Renato Schifani (2001–2008), Gaetano Quagliariello (deputy leader of PdL's group, 2008–2009)
- Party Leader in the European Parliament: Giancarlo Ligabue (1994–1997), Claudio Azzolini (1997–1999), Antonio Tajani (1999–2009)

== Symbols ==
1994 general election

1996 general election

2001 general election

== Bibliography ==
- Ruzza, Carlo; Fella, Stefano (2009). "Forza Italia". In Ruzza, Carlo; Fella, Stefano (eds.). Re-Inventing the Italian Right: Territorial Politics, Populism and 'Post-Fascism'. London New York: Routledge. pp. 104–140. ISBN 9780415344616.
- Hopkin, Jonathan (2004). "Forza Italia after ten years". Italian Politics. 20: 83–99. doi:10.3167/ip.2004.200106. JSTOR 43039789.
- McDonnell, Duncan (April 2013). "Silvio Berlusconi's Personal Parties: From Forza Italia to the Popolo Della Libertà". Political Studies. 61 (S1): 217–233. doi:10.1111/j.1467-9248.2012.01007.x. S2CID 143141811.
- Paolucci, Caterina (August 2006). "The nature of Forza Italia and the Italian transition". Journal of Southern Europe and the Balkans. 8 (2): 163–178. doi:10.1080/14613190600787260. S2CID 154702539.
- Poli, Emanuela (2001). Forza Italia: Strutture, leadership e radicamento territoriale. Bologna: Il Mulino.
- Raniolo, Francesco (December 2006). "Forza Italia: a leader with a party". South European Society and Politics. 11 (3–4): 439–455. doi:10.1080/13608740600856470. S2CID 153444704.
