= Italian Liberal Party (1997) =

Italian political party

Italian Liberal Party Partito Liberale Italiano
- Secretary: Grazio Trufolo
- President: Stefano De Luca
- Founded: 4 July 1997; 29 years ago
- Split from: Union of the Centre
- Preceded by: Italian Liberal Party
- Headquarters: Via Romagna 26, 00187 Rome, Lazio
- Newspaper: Rivoluzione liberale
- Youth wing: Italian Liberal Youth
- Ideology: Liberalism
- Political position: Centre to centre-right
- National affiliation: House of Freedoms (2006); New Pole for Italy (2011); Centre-right coalition (since 2016, with interruptions)
- Chamber of Deputies: 0 / 400
- Senate: 0 / 200
- European Parliament: 0 / 76
- Regional Councils: 0 / 896

Website
- www.partitoliberaleitaliano.org

The Italian Liberal Party (Italian: Partito Liberale Italiano; PLI) is a minor liberal political party in Italy, which considers itself to be the successor of the original Italian Liberal Party (PLI), the Italian main centre-right liberal party that was active in different capacities from 1922 to 1994. Originally named the Liberal Party (Partito Liberale), the new PLI changed its name in 2004. It is not represented in the Italian Parliament.

== History ==
=== Foundation and early years ===
In July 1997 former members of the Italian Liberal Party (PLI) and, mostly, of the Union of the Centre (UdC), that is to say PLI's main successor, as well as some former Republicans formed the Liberal Party (PL). Most of its leading figures were also members of Forza Italia (FI): Stefano De Luca, Carlo Scognamiglio, Egidio Sterpa, Ernesto Caccavale, Luigi Caligaris and Guglielmo Castagnetti. Scognamiglio was a former President of the Senate (1994–96), De Luca, Caccavale and Caligaris MEPs, while Sterpa would have been elected to the Chamber of Deputies for FI in 2001.

In December 2004 the party was merged with other liberal groups and, as result, its name was changed to Italian Liberal Party (PLI), along with the claim of being the successor of the historical PLI, disbanded in 1994. At that point the party was completely enfranchised from FI and the centre-right House of Freedoms coalition, even though Sterpa continued to be a deputy within FI's parliamentary group.

In the 2006 Italian general election the PLI shortly rejoined the House of Freedoms. Being present only in a few regions, it obtained 0.3% of the vote.

=== Enlargement of the party ===
In June 2007, during a party congress, the PLI reaffirmed its autonomy and De Luca was unanimously re-elected secretary. Additionally, some leading former Liberals joined (or re-joined) the party: Carlo Scognamiglio (PLD), Luigi Compagna (UDC) and Luciano Magnalbò (DLI/AN).

For the 2008 general election the PLI tried to form an electoral pact with the Union of Christian and Centre Democrats (UDC), but finally chose to run as a stand-alone list. Running in a few constituencies, the party obtained 0.3% of the vote and no seats.

In February 2009 the PLI held another congress. Arturo Diaconale, supported by Angelo Caniglia, a group of Liberal Reformers (including Marco Taradash, Emilia Rossi, Carlo Monaco and Pietro Milio) and other newcomers, presented his candidacy for secretary in opposition to De Luca, who was supported by the old guard and by Paolo Guzzanti, a dissenting member of Forza Italia and former Socialist. De Luca was re-elected with the support of 73% of the delegates, Guzzanti was appointed deputy secretary and Scognamiglio president. Diaconale left the party and would later revive the Italian Liberal Right (DLI), along with Giuseppe Basini.

In December 2010 Guzzanti left the party over personal problems with De Luca and became briefly engaged with the New Pole for Italy (NPI). In March 2011 the party was joined by two former secretaries of the old PLI, Alfredo Biondi, who had represented FI in Parliament from 1994 to 2006, and Renato Altissimo.

=== Back in Parliament ===
In 2011 the PLI was joined by Enrico Musso, a senator of The People of Freedom (PdL), who was soon appointed deputy secretary of party. Through Musso the party re-joined the NPI.

In November 2011 five disgruntled deputies of the PdL (Roberto Antonione, Giustina Destro, Fabio Gava, Giancarlo Pittelli, who later left, and Luciano Sardelli) joined the party through the Liberals for Italy (LpI). Another former member of the PdL, Angelo Santori, joined the "Liberals for Italy–PLI" sub-group in April 2012.

In March 2012, in the run-up of a congress, Scognamiglio, Biondi and Altissimo proposed Musso as new secretary and De Luca as president. The proposal was not well received by the party's old guard and, not only De Luca was barely re-elected secretary, but Scognamiglio was replaced as president by Enzo Palumbo. In the 2012 municipal election in Genoa, Musso obtained 15.0% of the vote in the first round, as joint NPI candidate, and 40.3% in the run-off, losing to Marco Doria.

In November 2012, a group of deputies (Isabella Bertolini, Gaetano Pecorella, Giorgio Stracquadanio (who had left earlier), Franco Stradella and Roberto Tortoli) broke away from the PdL and formed Free Italy (IL). According to Bertolini, the reason for the split was the attitude of the PdL toward Mario Monti's government, as the party approved all government measures but at the same time bitterly contested them in public communication. In December 2012 the LpI–PLI joined forces with IL and formed a 10-strong sub-group.

In the 2013 general election, the PLI ran with the wording "Liberals for Italy", getting 0.1% of the vote.

In June 2013 Guzzanti re-joined the PLI and was soon elected at the head of the party's national council.

In February 2014 several disillusioned members or former members of the party, including Altissimo, Biondi, Musso and Scognamiglio, plus Edoardo Croci, Giuliano Urbani and Alessandro Ortis, launched The Liberals as an alternative to the PLI, but the new group acted more as think tank than an actual party.

In the run-up of the 2014 European Parliament election the PLI joined the European Choice (SE) list, led by Civic Choice (SC). This decision, strongly supported by De Luca, prompted Guzzanti to leave the party and stand as candidate for the newly-reformed Forza Italia (FI), and eventually De Luca to step down as secretary.

In October 2014, during a party congress, the PLI elected a new leadership, notably including Giancarlo Morandi as secretary, De Luca president and Daniele Toto, a former deputy of the PdL and Future and Freedom (FLI), coordinator. The day after the congress, the PLI mourned the death of Carla Martino, long-time president of the party, later honorary president and sister of FI's leading liberal Antonio Martino. In November Ivan Catalano, a dissident deputy of the Five Star Movement (M5S), joined the PLI, marking its return to Parliament. A few months later, in March 2015, Catalano was expelled from the party for having joined the parliamentary group of SC.

=== From centre to centre-right ===
In the 2016 municipal election in Rome the PLI, which supported Giorgia Meloni of Brothers of Italy (FdI) for mayor, obtained 0.9% of the vote.

In December 2016 Cinzia Bonfrisco (ex-PSI/FI/PdL/FI/CoR) joined the PLI, giving it representation in the Senate.

In May 2017 the party's congress re-elected Morandi and De Luca as secretary and president, respectively. Additionally, Scognamiglio and Basini were appointed honorary presidents. Scognamiglio's election marked the return into the party of most of The Liberals, while Basini's the return of the "Liberal Right" or "National-Liberal" faction. Also in May, Bonfrisco was a founding member, along with Identity and Action (IdeA), of the moderate centre-right Federation of Freedom (FdL) group.

In the run-up of the 2018 general election the PLI officially joined the centre-right coalition, through an electoral agreement with Lega Nord (LN). The LN, rebranded simply as "Lega", obtained 17.4% of the vote and two Liberals were elected from its slates: Basini to the Chamber and Bonfrisco to the Senate, both from Lazio. Also De Luca stood as a candidate (he headed Lega's list in Naples), but was not elected. Soon as in 2009 the PLI's alignment with the Lega was no longer fully clear, but Basini continued to sit within the party's group in the Chamber and Bonfrisco was elected to the European Parliament in the 2019 European Parliament election. The PLI's congress was supposed to be held in late 2019, but was later postponed.

In March 2020 the congress was finally held. Secretary Morandi left the party a few days before the assembly was convened in Rome. After the congress, the new leadership still included De Luca as president and Scognamiglio as honorary president, while those members who had been more involved in the alliance with the Lega, notably including the other incumbent honorary president, senator Basini, were no longer mentioned in the party's website. Morandi was replaced by a three-person secretariat, composed of Nicola Fortuna, Claudio Gentile and Roberto Sorcinelli. Basini and Bonfrisco revived the DLI as an associate party of the LN and then of Lega per Salvini Premier (LSP).

In July 2022 the party's council removed president De Luca and co-secretary Fortuna, who supported an electoral pact with Action, in order to pursue an alliance with the centre-right. De Luca was replaced by Francesco Pasquali, while Sorcinelli became the party's sole secretary. De Luca deemed the conuncil's convocation and deliberation as illegitimate and his associate Giulia Pantaleo, leader of the Italian Liberal Youth, tried to register the symbol of the PLI on De Luca's behalf: the request was rejected in favour of Sorcinelli's PLI. In the 2022 general election the PLI supported FI, but former prosecutor Carlo Nordio, a leading member of the party, was a successful candidate for the Brothers of Italy (FdI) in Veneto. A few days before the election, during a party congress, Sorcinelli and Pasquali were confirmed as secretary and president, respectively. In June 2023 Guzzanti returned to the party and was appointed deputy secretary.

In July 2025 a tribunal in Rome court warned Sorcinelli and Pasquali against using the party's symbol and name, declaring secretary Grazio Trufolo and presidente De Luca, elected during a national congress earlier that month, as legitimate representatives. In the meantime, Sorcinelli, who had acknowledged his demise, and Pasquali, as "Independent Liberals", organised the "Committee for the Reunification of Liberals".

== Leadership ==
- Secretary: Stefano De Luca (1997–2014), Giancarlo Morandi (2014–2020), Nicola Fortuna (2020–2022), Claudio Gentile (2020–2022), Roberto Sorcinelli (2020–2025), Grazio Trufolo (2025–present)
  - Deputy Secretary: Luigi Compagna (1997–2004), Attilio Bastianini (2000–2004), Savino Melillo (2000–2004), Salvatore Grillo (2007–2008), Paolo Guzzanti (2009–2010), Enrico Musso (2011–2012), Simone Santucci (2016), Giuseppe Zecchillo (2022–2023), Paolo Guzzanti (2023–2025)
  - Coordinator: Angelo Caniglia (2008–2009), Roberto Petrassi (2009–2010), Mario Caputi (2010–2012), Edoardo De Blasio (2013–2014), Daniele Toto (2014–2015), Massimo Rodighiero (2022–2025)
  - Treasurer: Savino Melillo (2007–2008), Maurizio Irti (2010–2012), Giancarlo Morandi (2012–2014), Claudio Vitali (2014–2020), Francesco Pasquali (2020–2025)
- President: Egidio Sterpa (1997–2000), Carla Martino (2000–2009), Carlo Scognamiglio (2009–2012), Enzo Palumbo (2012–2014), Stefano De Luca (2014–2022), Francesco Pasquali (2022–2025), Stefano De Luca (2025–present)
  - Vice President: Mario Brugia (2025–present)
- President of the National Council: Giuseppe Basini (2004–2008), Carlo Scognamiglio (2008–2009), Enzo Palumbo (2009–2012), Renata Jannuzzi (2012–2013), Paolo Guzzanti (2013–2014), Antonio Pileggi (2014–2018), Giuseppe Basini (2018–2020), Antonio Vox (2020), Diego Di Pierro (2022–2025)
- Honorary President: Gianfranco Ciaurro (1997–2000), Carla Martino (2009–2014), Giuseppe Basini (2017–2020), Carlo Scognamiglio (2017–2022)
