= Popular Liberalism =

Popular Liberalism (Liberalismo Popolare, LP), subsequently known also as Houses of the Citizen (Case del Cittadino, CdC), was a liberal faction within Forza Italia, a political party in Italy.

The group was basically composed of those Liberals (former members of the Italian Liberal Party, PLI) who formed the Union of the Centre in 1993, after the PLI's dissolution, took part to the Pole of Freedoms/Pole for Freedoms coalition and finally joined Forza Italia in 1999, continuing its activity through the association Liberal Union of the Centre (Unione Liberale di Centro, ULdC). The LP faction was founded in 2003 by six Forza Italia's MPs: three former Liberals (Alfredo Biondi, Raffaele Costa and Valter Zanetta) and three former Christian Democrats with a liberal streak (Roberto Rosso, Renzo Patria and Benedetto Nicotra) and had circles all around Italy, especially in Piedmont, home-region of Costa, Zanetta, Rosso and Patria.

== Leadership ==
- Secretary: Raffaele Costa
- President: Alfredo Biondi
