= Carlo Scognamiglio =

Italian economist and politician (born 1944)

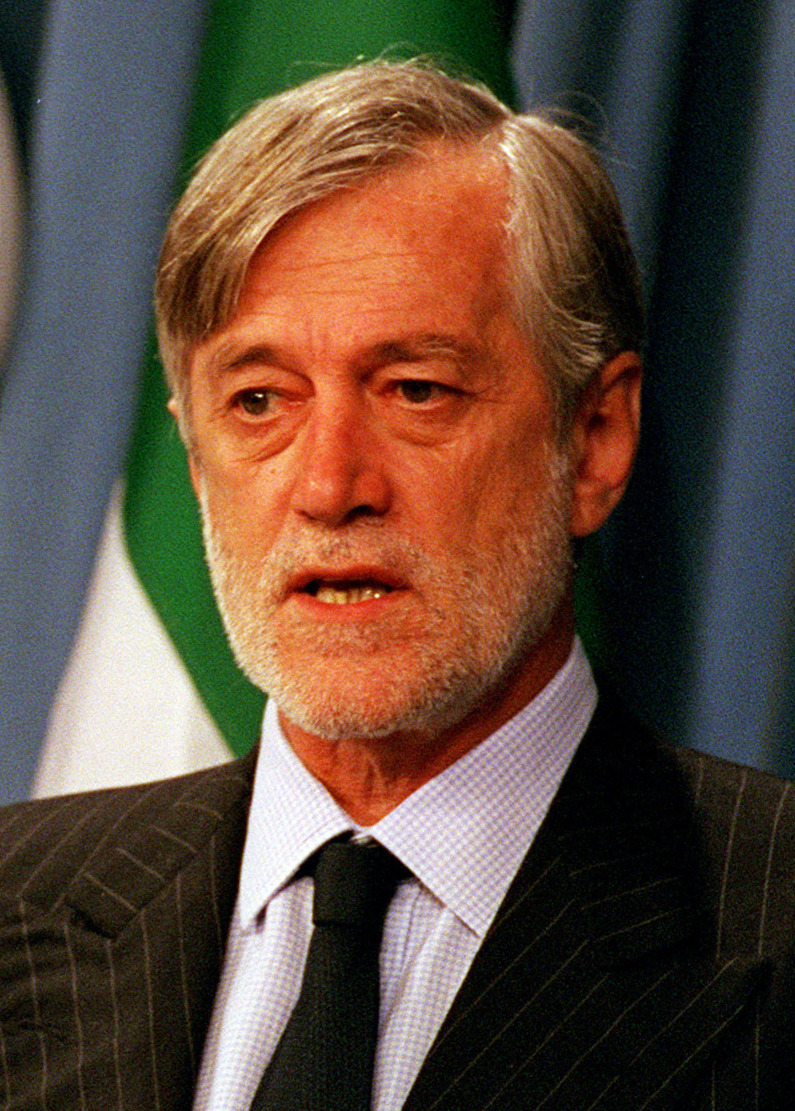

President of the Senate of the Republic
- In office 16 April 1994 – 8 May 1996
- Preceded by: Giovanni Spadolini
- Succeeded by: Nicola Mancino

Minister of Defence
- In office 21 October 1998 – 22 December 1999
- Prime Minister: Massimo D'Alema
- Preceded by: Beniamino Andreatta
- Succeeded by: Sergio Mattarella

Member of the Senate of the Republic
- In office 23 April 1992 – 29 May 2001
- Constituency: Lombardy

Personal details
- Born: 27 November 1944 (age 81) Varese, Kingdom of Italy
- Party: PLI (2008–2014; since 2020)
- Other political affiliations: PLI (1992–1994); UdC (1994–1998); UDR (1998–1999); UpR (1999–2001); FdL (2001); ED (2001–2002); PLD (2003–2006); The Liberals (2014–2020)
- Education: Bocconi University
- Profession: Economist

Carlo Scognamiglio Pasini (born 27 November 1944) is an Italian economist and politician. He is a university professor in applied economics, and was Chancellor of the LUISS University of Rome (1984–1992). He was President of the Italian Senate from 1994 to 1996 and Minister of Defence from 1998 to 2000.

== Early life and education ==
After graduating in Economics from Bocconi University in Milan, Scognamiglio specialized in Industrial Economics at the London School of Economics (LSE) under the supervision of Basil Yamey and Harry Johnson. A professor of Finance and Industrial Economics since 1973, he was elected Chancellor of the LUISS University in 1984. In 1988 the Académie française awarded him its prestigious Economics prize. As a sportsman, Scognamiglio was a world sailing champion (winning the International Ocean Races - One Ton Cup in 1976).

== Political career ==
In 1992, Scognamiglio became a Senator for the Italian Liberal Party (PLI), and was soon appointed as chairman of the Senate's Committee for European Affairs. Re-elected in 1994 on the Forza Italia (FI) lists as a member of the liberal Union of the Centre (UdC), he was President of the Senate for the first two years of the XII Government.

In 1998, Scognamiglio joined the new party established by former President Francesco Cossiga, the Democratic Union for the Republic (UDR), and was Minister of Defence from 21 October 1998 to 22 December 1999, a period that spanned NATO's intervention in Kosovo (March–June 1999). As minister he promoted the repeal of the draft, the transformation of the Italian armed forces on a professional basis, the opening of military service to women, and the rise of the Corps of Carabinieri as a fourth branch of the Italian military forces.

Scognamiglio returned to academia in 2001, although he continued to maintain a level of political engagement, as demonstrated by his leadership of the Pact of Liberal Democrats with Mario Segni (commonly known as the Segni-Scognamiglio Pact) from 2003 to 2006. He is Professor Emeritus of applied economics and lifetime trustee of the Aspen Institute. He is also Honorary President of the reconstituted Italian Liberal Party and a member of the Italy-USA Foundation.

== Publications ==
Scognamiglio is the author of over 80 publications in English and Italian, including:

- L'Arte della Ricchezza. Cesare Beccaria economista. Mondadori, Milano 2014
- Keynes and the New Millennium Crisis, Treves Editore, Roma 2009.
- Adam Smith. Adam Smith visto da Carlo Scognamiglio Pasini, Luiss University Press, Roma 2007 and 2009^{2}.
- Economia industriale. Economia dei mercati imperfetti, Luiss University Press, Roma 2006.
- Adam Smith XXI secolo, Luiss University Press, Roma 2005.
- La guerra del Kosovo, Rizzoli, Milano 2002.
- La democrazia in Italia, Rizzoli, Milano 1996.
- Teoria e politica della finanza industriale, il Mulino, Bologna 1987.
- Crisi e risanamento dell'industria italiana, Giuffrè, Milano 1979.
- Mercato dei capitali, borse valori e finanziamento delle imprese industriali, Franco Angeli Edizioni, Milano 1974.
- The Economics of the Stock Market, Giuffrè, Milano 1972.

Political offices
| Preceded by Giovanni Spadolini | President of the Italian Senate; 1994–1996 | Succeeded by Nicola Mancino |
| Preceded by Beniamino Andreatta | Minister of Defence; 1998–1999 | Succeeded by Sergio Mattarella |
Party political offices
| Preceded by Carla Martino | President of Italian Liberal Party; 2009–2012 | Succeeded by Enzo Palumbo |
