= Italian Liberal Right =

Italian Liberal Right Destra Liberale Italiana
- President: Cinzia Bonfrisco
- Founded: 1994 (1st); 2019 (2nd)
- Dissolved: 2011
- Split from: Italian Liberal Party (1st); Italian Liberal Party (1997) (2nd)
- Merged into: The People of Freedom (1st)
- Ideology: Conservative liberalism (Self-proclaimed); Liberism; Europeism
- Political position: Centre-right
- National affiliation: National Alliance (1994–2007); Lega (2019–present)
- European Parliament group: Identity and Democracy
- Chamber of Deputies: 0 / 400
- Senate: 0 / 200
- European Parliament: 0 / 76

Website
- https://www.destraliberale.it

The Italian Liberal Right (Italian: Destra Liberale Italiana, DLI) or, simply, Liberal Right alternatively called sometimes Liberals for Italy, is a minor moderate self-proclaimed conservative-liberal political party in Italy.

== History ==
The party was founded in 1994 by members of the right-wing of the Italian Liberal Party (PLI). Leading members included Gabriele Pagliuzzi, Giuseppe Basini, Luciano Magnalbò and Saverio Porcari Lidestri. The DLI soon allied itself with the National Alliance (AN), of which it became the liberal faction. In the 1994, 1996 and 2001 general elections, some members of DLI, including Pagliuzzi, Basini and Magnalbò were elected in the Italian Parliament for AN.

In 2001 Pagliuzzi and Basini left AN, due to their exclusion from party lists for the general election, and re-established DLI, renaming it the Liberal Right – Liberals for Italy (Destra Liberale – Liberali per l'Italia, DL-LpI). Basini left the DL-LpI in 2004 in order to join the re-established Italian Liberal Party of Stefano De Luca, while Pagliuzzi remained in charge of party leadership. Magnalbò was a senator for AN until 2006 and then joined the new PLI in 2007 too.

By 2007 DL-LpI had become a tiny liberal political action committee. Eugenio Riccio (former member of the Italian Social Movement and later of AN) joined Pagliuzzi in a convention on the future of the party. The most likely options were either a merger with The Right or with The People of Freedom (PdL). Lately in 2007, the party was re-named Italian Liberal Right, its original name. In 2011 Pagliuzzi led his group into the PdL.

In 2019 Basini, Anna Cinzia Bonfrisco and Arturo Diaconale re-launched DLI as an internal faction and/or associate party of Lega.

== Ideology ==
DLI is a moderate self-described as conservative liberal party expousing europeism and support for liberism. DLI members were keen on supporting centralism as they claim to be successors of the national-liberals from the risorgimento movement, thus they strongly opposed any form of federalism and proposed the abolition of the Regions, including those with special statute, and the Provinces in Italy. In the latest political program, possibly due to the alliance with the federalist Lega, these proposals are not included.

== Leadership ==
- President: Giuseppe Basini (1994–2004), Gabriele Pagliuzzi (2004–2011), Cinzia Bonfrisco (2019–present)
  - Honorary President: Giuseppe Basini (2019–present)
  - President of the National Council: Gabriele Pagliuzzi (2019–present)
- Secretary: Gabriele Pagliuzzi (1994–2004), Michele Gelardi (2019–present)

== Election results ==
=== Italian Parliament ===
Election	Leader	Chamber of Deputies				Senate of the Republic			
Election	Leader	Votes	%	Seats	+/–	Votes	%	Seats	+/–
2022	Cinzia Bonfrisco	Into Lega		0 / 400	New	Into Lega		0 / 200	New

=== European Parliament ===
Election	Leader	Votes	%	Seats	+/–	EP Group
2024	Cinzia Bonfrisco	Into Lega		0 / 76	New	–

== See also ==
- Liberalism and radicalism in Italy
