= Nicolò Carandini =

Italian politician (1896–1972)

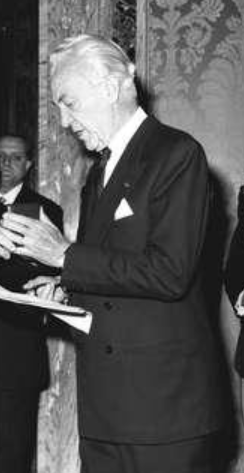
Nicolò Carandini, 1967

Count Nicolò Carandini (6 December 1896 – 18 March 1972) was a leader of Italian post−World War II liberalism and a champion of European Federalism. He was the first Italian ambassador to Britain after World War II, and the first president of Alitalia from its foundation in 1948 until his retirement in 1968.

== Biography ==
Carandini was born in Como. His political career started in the 1920s when he got involved in the Italian democratic veterans movement, but he retired from political life after the rise of the fascist regime. In 1926 he married Elena Albertini, daughter of Luigi Albertini, who in 1925 had been removed by the fascists from his position as Director of the newspaper Corriere della Sera. Carandini then became chief administrator of the Torre in Pietra estate near Rome, transforming it into a modern agricultural enterprise. During the years of fascism he came into closer contact with democratic opposition groups around liberal philosopher Benedetto Croce and developed ideas of a modern reformatory liberalism, based on the principle of social justice.

In May 1943, two months before the overthrow of Benito Mussolini, he wrote liberal pamphlets and organized their distribution in the Roman underground. In August, he joined other liberals such as Leone Cattani, Alessandro Casati and Mario Pannunzio to refound the Italian Liberal Party (PLI). After the armistice of September 1943 and the ensuing German occupation of Rome he joined the underground Comitato di Liberazione Nazionale (the political organization of the Italian Resistance). After the liberation of Rome in June 1944, he became Minister in the antifascist Bonomi government. In November 1944 he became Italy's first Ambassador in Great Britain after the end of the fascist regime (which still existed as a German satellite state in Northern Italy until April 1945). He proved to be an efficient diplomat in his efforts to regain British confidence in the new Italian democratic government, but wasn't able to avoid his country being treated as a loser of World War II by the British and their Allies in the upcoming Peace Treaties. In 1946 at the Paris Conference he brokered the Gruber-De Gasperi Agreement that settled the dispute on South Tyrol between Italy and Austria. He returned from Great Britain in autumn 1947.

The 1947 Congress of the Italian Liberal Party (PLI) signed a complete split between the Carandini-led left and the majoritarian right of the PLI. Not being able to gain the support of the party-centre, in early 1948 Carandini and other left-wing liberals left the PLI, aiming to assemble a Third Force alliance of all centre-left democratic parties as a counterpart to the dominating Christian Democrats and to the rising Italian Communist Party. By 1951 those plans had failed, but Carandini had contributed in a change of the PLI-leadership (Bruno Villabruna) and a more progressive orientation of the party, which he and his movement re-joined in the end of that year. But in 1954 the liberals once again changed leadership (Giovanni Malagodi) and the following year Carandini and other left-wing liberals left the party for the second time to found the Partito Radicale that existed as a small party until 1962. After that date he retired from political life.

Carandini was a leading member of the Movimento Federalista Europeo, founded in 1943 on the basis of the 1942 Ventotene Manifesto by Altiero Spinelli and Ernesto Rossi. In a controversial 1948 speech he argued that Britain's ties to Commonwealth and USA should not impede other European countries from forming the nucleus of a future United States of Europe.

From 1948 to 1968 he served as president of the airline Alitalia.

Carandini was second cousin once removed of the British film star Christopher Lee (who claimed it was Carandini who suggested he become an actor). One of his sons is Roman archaeologist Andrea Carandini, and one of his grandsons is neuroscientist Matteo Carandini.
