= Valerio Zanone =

Italian politician (1936–2016)

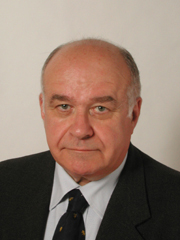

Mayor of Turin
- In office 30 July 1990 – 1 January 1992
- Preceded by: Maria Magnani Noya
- Succeeded by: Baldassarre Furnari
Ministerial offices
Minister of Defence
In office 28 July 1987 – 22 July 1989
Prime Minister	Giovanni Goria; Ciriaco De Mita
Preceded by	Remo Gaspari
Succeeded by	Mino Martinazzoli
Minister of Industry, Commerce, and Craftmanship
In office 1 August 1986 – 3 March 1987
Prime Minister	Bettino Craxi
Preceded by	Renato Altissimo
Succeeded by	Franco Piga
Minister of Ecology
In office 30 July 1984 – 1 August 1986
Prime Minister	Bettino Craxi
Preceded by	Alfredo Biondi
Succeeded by	Francesco De Lorenzo
Parliamentary offices
Member of the Senate of the Republic
In office 27 April 2006 – 28 April 2008
Constituency	Lombardy
Member of the Chamber of Deputies
In office 23 April 1992 – 14 April 1994
Constituency	Turin–Novara–Vercelli
In office 5 July 1976 – 8 November 1990
Constituency	Turin–Novara–Vercelli

Personal details
- Born: 22 January 1936 Turin, Italy
- Died: 7 January 2016 (aged 79) Rome, Italy
- Party: PLI (1955–1993); ULD (1993–1995); FdL (1995-2004); DL (2004–2007); PD (2007–2010); ApI (2010–2016)
- Occupation: Journalist, politician

Valerio Zanone (22 January 1936 – 7 January 2016) was an Italian politician who served as a minister in various Italian governments, including these led by Bettino Craxi, Giovanni Goria, and Ciriaco De Mita during the 1980s. He was mayor of Turin from 1990 to 1992. Within the Italian Parliament, he served as deputy from 1970 to 1992, and was also a senator from 2006 to 2008.

Zanone began his career in the Italian Liberal Party (Partito Liberale Italiano, PLI) during the 1950s. In the early 1970s, he was involved in the regional politics of Piedmont. In 1976, he was appointed secretary of the PLI, a position he held until 1985, and was the party president from 1991 to 1993. After resigning from the PLI, Zanone founded his own liberal-democratic movement close to the centre-left, before joining other liberal and centrist parties within the Italian centre-left.

== Early life and career ==
Zanone was born on 22 January 1936 in Turin. After attending the Liceo Classico Massimo d'Azeglio, he graduated in Literature and Philosophy from the University of Turin, defending with his supervisor Luigi Pareysona a thesis on the aesthetics of Giordano Bruno. During the 1950s, Zanone worked as an editor at the Einaudi publishing house. In 1964, he co-founded the Luigi Einaudi Research and Documentation Centre (Centro di Ricerca e Documentazione Luigi Einaudi) in Turin. Also in 1964, he became a member of the editorial board of the magazine Biblioteca della libertà.

In 1966, Zanone became a member of the Italian Order of Journalists (Ordine dei giornalisti) and the Subalpine Press Association (Associazione Stampa Subalpina). In 1969, he started working as a contract contributor to Il Sole 24 Ore. During his long political career, Zanone was a journalist by trade, and devoted himself to journalism and culture, and to studies on liberalism in the mid-1990s. He also collaborated on a history of Italian liberals from the unification of Italy to the present day. Among his publications were L'età liberale. Democrazie e capitalismo nella società aperta (1997).

== Italian Liberal Party ==
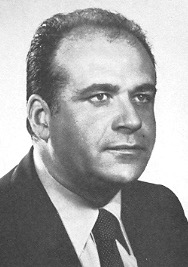
Zanone as a member of the Chamber of Deputies

After entering the PLI in 1955, Zanone was a regional councillor in Piedmont from 1970 to 1976, serving as secretary of the Special Commission for the Statute and president of the Legislative Commission for Environmental Protection. During these years, he gained experience in the implementation of regional law, editing the study Potere statale e riforma regionale. Ricerca sullo stato di attuazione dell'ordinamento regionale, which was published by the Bologna-based publishing house Il Mulino. Zanone was a member of the Chamber of Deputies from 1976 to 1990, the year he was elected by the city council as mayor of Turin, and from 1992 to 1994, both times in the constituency of Turin–Novara–Vercelli. First elected in the 7th legislature of Italy (5 July 1976 – 2 April 1979), he was re-elected for the 8th (20 June 1979 – 4 May 1983), the 9th (12 July 1983 – 28 April 1987), the 10th (2 July 1987 – 2 February 1992; he resigned on 8 November 1990), and the 11th legislatures (23 April 1992 – 16 January 1994), assuming various parliamentary roles from time to time.

From 1976 to 1985, Zanone was national secretary of the PLI, succeeding Giovanni Malagodi, a conservative liberal who he often criticised during the 1960s, and later served as president of the PLI. He had been a national councillor of the PLI since 1969 and a member of the central management (direzione centrale) since 1971. First appointed secretary general of the PLI on 1 February 1976, he was confirmed in this position at the next four party congresses, including the 15th in Naples (1976), the 16th in Rome (1979), the 17th in Florence (1981), and the 18th in Turin (1984), until 19 July 1985. His secretariat was marked by the Years of Lead and the alliance with the Italian Socialist Party (Partito Socialista Italiano, PSI) under Bettino Craxi, for example during the 1985 Italian wage referendum, which was a difficult transition of Italian politics as it confirmed the end of the sliding wage scale (scala mobile) and instead decoupled wage dynamics from inflation trends.

In 1985, Zanone was appointed Minister of Ecology (without portfolio) in the first Craxi government (1983–1986), being among the signatories of the law for the creation of a Ministry of the Environment, among the first in Europe. He was Minister of Industry, Commerce, and Craftmanship during the second Craxi government (1986–1987), implementing together with others the National Energy Conference, which was presided over by the former Bank of Italy governor Paolo Baffi, and Minister of Defence in the Goria and De Mita governments (1987–1989), taking responsibility for the mission of Italian sailors in the Persian Gulf, and also preparing, among other things, a programme of modernisation of the Italian Armed Forces. From 1989 to 1990, he was also president of the Defence Committee of the Chamber of Deputies; previously, he had been a member of the Fourth Permanent Commission (Defence) of the Chamber of Deputies under the chairmanship of Lelio Lagorio, before he then assumed its presidency during the 10th legislature from 18 October 1989 to 15 January 1990. In 1991, Zanone was elected president of the PLI.

In November 1992, Zanone admitted his membership in the Turin lodge Augusta Taurinorum of the Grand Orient of Italy, and that he had a speaking role at the Grand Orient of Italy conferences, later emphasising that the notorious Propaganda Due was to Freemasonry what fascism was to the ideal of the fatherland. This coincided with a progressive distancing from frontline politics within the PLI, which was marked by the involvement of his protégé Renato Altissimo in the Emimont scandal, which was part of the Mani pulite inquiries that revolutionised Italy and gave rise to the Second Italian Republic. His distance from politics continued until June 1993 when he resigned from the position of party president. From 1992 to 1994, he was president of the Cortese Foundation in Naples. Since 1990, he also began to hold a series of prestigious positions at foundations (the Luigi Einaudi Foundation in Turin and Rome, and the Filippo Burzio Foundation in Turin), banks (Cassa di Risparmio di Torino and Unicredit), and institutions (Lingotto in Turin and the Association of Italian Cultural Institutions, of which he served as vice president).

== Mayor of Turin ==
Elected by the Turin City Council on 30 July 1990 at the head of the Pentapartito coalition, Zanone was mayor of Turin for a year and a half (1990–1992) during the turbulent years of the early 1990s until 1 January 1992, after his resignation on 31 December 1991, with Baldassarre Furnari of the Italian Democratic Socialist Party (Partito Socialista Democratico Italiano, PSDI) heading the local caretaker government until the election of the Italian Republican Party (Partito Repubblicano Italiano, PRI) member Giovanna Cattaneo Incisa. During his time as mayor, the city's general municipal master plan (piano regolatore generale comunale) was approved by the City Council of Turin. On 14 December 1992, he ended his role as councillor, from which he had been serving since 25 June 1990. His resignations stemmed from his decision to run for the Chamber of Deputies in 1992.

== Liberal Democratic Union and Federation of Liberals ==
After the Tangentopoli scandal and his resignation from the PLI in 1993, Zanone formed a centre-left party called the Liberal Democratic Union (Unione Liberaldemocratica, ULD). This minor party, mainly present in Piedmont, aligned itself with Mario Segni and his National Rebirth Pact (Patto di Rinascita Nazionale, PdRN), best known as the Segni Pact (Patto Segni, PS), in the run-up to the 1994 Italian general election under the new mixed electoral system system. Zanone was critical of the pro-Silvio Berlusconi attitude of some former PLI members and liberals, and spoke of "an illiberal government".

In the first-past-the-post system, Zanone's party fielded its own candidates in the centrist coalition of the Pact for Italy (Patto per l'Italia, PpI); in the proportional representation system, it ran on the lists of the PS, which also featured Liberal Democrats (Liberaldemocratici) on its symbol. During the second party congress of the Federation of Liberals (Federazione dei Liberali, FdL) in February 1995, Zanone merged the Liberal Democratic Union with the FdL, of which he was appointed president; the FdL had been founded on 6 February 1994 as the legal successor of the PLI and was led by Raffaello Morelli.

== The Olive Tree and centre-left coalition ==
In June 1995, Zanone and the FdL secretary participated in the founding of The Olive Tree (L'Ulivo) coalition led by Romano Prodi. About the role of the FdL, Zanone said: "In the Babel of transformism where everyone calls themselves liberal, we remain so, faithful to the liberal-democratic tradition that has never swung to the right. Ours is an autonomous liberal position that finds its natural interlocutors in the centre and in Romano Prodi's candidacy for prime minister. His candidacy is an expression of social and cultural circles that can make a successful contribution to the liberal-democratic alternative against right-wing populism."

Amid divisions within the FdL, Zanone and Morelli reiterated the support to The Olive Tree, particularly the Democratic Union (Unione Democratica, UD). Ahead of the 1996 Italian general election, Zanone said: "The majoritarian principle requires reaching agreements with others, not masking ourselves. As liberals, we stand with the Democratic Union and the Olive Tree coalition, because, as always, we stand with liberal democracy, which is completely different from the new right." According to Zanone, the true leader of the centre-right coalition (coalizione di centro-destra) was Gianfranco Fini, a post-fascist, stating: "Even if he's thrown his black shirt in the washing machine, that right isn't for us." Ahead of the 1999 European Parliament election in Italy, the FdL formed an electoral alliance with the PRI of Ugo La Malfa.

Within the centre-left coalition (coalizione di centro-sinistra), Zanone left the FdL in 2004 to join the centrist Democracy is Freedom – The Daisy (Democrazia è Libertà – La Margherita, DL), which was led by Francesco Rutelli. Starting in 2001, while remaining president of the FdL, he was a member of the Federal Assembly of the DL. In November 2004, he founded the Association for Liberal Democracy (Associazione per la Liberaldemocrazia, AplL), a political association aiming to organise liberals scattered across the various centre-left parties to contribute "with genuinely liberal initiatives to the reformist alternative project", breaking away from the FdL and joining the DL.

In the 2006 Italian general election, Zanone was elected to the Senate of the Republic, having run on the DL's party list in the Lombardy constituency, after twelve years outside of parliamentary politics but not politics as a whole. In 2007, he joined the centre-left Democratic Party (Partito Democratico, PD), the result of a merge between the Democrats of the Left (Democratici di Sinistra, DS) and the DL, which critics described as having treated him as "little more than a coat of arms to be flaunted". From 2006 to 2008, Zanone was a member of the Senate, serving in several parliamentary delegations and commissions, including being a member and vice-president of the 4th Standing Committee (Defense), member of the Commission of Inquiry into Depleted Uranium, member of the Italian Parliamentary Delegation to the NATO Parliamentary Assembly, and member of the Parliamentary Commission of Inquiry into the Waste Cycle and Related Illicit Activities.

== Later years and death ==
In 2010, while still adhering to the moderate centre-left, Zanone left the PD for the centrist Alliance for Italy (Alleanza per l'Italia, ApI). In May 2010, he announced his membership (including among others the fellow Turinese Gianni Vernetti) of Rutelli's ApI through the promotion and establishment of the Liberal Committee of the Alliance for Italy (Comitato Liberale per l'Alleanza per l'Italia, CLpApI). Ahead of the 2014 European Parliament election in Italy, he expressed interest for European Choice (Scelta Europea, SE), a pro-European and pro-federal Europe alliance in support of Guy Verhofstadt.

Zanone was the honorary president of a prestigious institution like the private foundation named after PLI leader and second Italian president Luigi Einaudi. In addition to being president of the Luigi Einaudi Foundation (Fondazione Luigi Einaudi, FLE) in Rome for economic and political studies, he was a member of the board of directors of the Luigi Einaudi Foundation in Turin from 1990 to 2007. Among the last political battles Zanone fought a few months before his death was that with Roberto Einaudi in relation to the Luigi Einaudi Foundation, which was at risk of liquidation, wanting to prevent the foundation from falling under the control of Berlusconi and Forza Italia, underlining his motto "Never with the Right" (mai con la destra). After a long illness dating back to at least one year, he died on 7 January 2016, aged 79, in Rome. He was survived by his wife Maria Pina and his three daughters Silvia, Laura, and Giulia.

== Legacy ==
As his fifty years of politics spanned Italian history during the First and Second Republics, Zanone proved to be among the most significant liberal figures in Italy as a longstanding PLI member, and was one of the most prominent figures in the history of the First Italian Republic. Throughout the various ministries entrusted to him, he demonstrated dynamism. A liberal-democratic intellectual in the Piedmontese tradition, Zanone described himself as "democratic, secular, pro-European, social", and criticised the former PLI leader (Malagodi) and the elitist conception of liberalism, so much so that some wondered why the PLI did not merge with the Italian Social Movement (Movimento Sociale Italiano, MSI) as both were right-wing parties. Malagodi reportedly said it would never happen as the MSI was not a liberal party, underlining the same ideals shared by Zanone, with the difference being in the means rather than the ends. Zanone was the leader of the left wing of the PLI, which was previously led by Marco Pannella. He asked to be remembered on the tombstone at the Monumental Cemetery of Turin simply as "liberal". He was also known for his opposition to Berlusconi and his centre-right coalition, owing to a sense of statehood that was matched by an enmity toward any form of conflict of interest that led him to be one of Berlusconi's staunchest opponents and to political conflicts with most of his former party members who had joined Forza Italia.

Described as a dissident and counter-current liberal "in blood and soul, as only a hard and pure Turin native like him could be, he was never afraid to go against the grain, both within the P.L.I. establishment and among the supporters of this great tradition", Zanone gave the party a more left-liberal (in the style of modern American liberalism) and popular imprint towards progressivism, which was initially unpopular with the party base and the electorate. Zanone ultimately succeeded in reintroducing the PLI into the governing majority after the conservative and free-market opposition of Malagodi, struck a Lib–Lab coalition-style agreement with Craxi's PSI that successfully established a dialogue between the two former rival parties, and was one of the protagonists of the five-party coalition (Pentapartito), a synthesis between centrism and the organic centre-left, and the spearheads of its secular component, along with Craxi and Giovanni Spadolini of the PRI. With Spadolini, Zanone shared a profound honesty (both of them were left unscathed during the Tangentopoli scandal), a strong sense of the state, and a fervent Europeanism. Like Spadolini, he devoted himself to the history of the Risorgimento, collaborating on the drafting of a history of the liberal world from the unification of Italy to the present.

Zanone's death was commemorated by prominent Italian figures and politicians. In his honour, President Sergio Mattarella issued a statement and praised him for his "high sense of state". Recalling "the deep friendship, both human and political, that bound me to the Honourable Zanone, an intelligent and modern guardian of the great Italian liberal tradition", Mattarella emphasised how "in all the numerous roles he held—party secretary, parliamentarian, mayor, and minister—he always brought his high sense of state, his integrity, his foresight, and his distinctive personal character, marked by kindness and humanity." Luigi Zanda, the then president of the PD's senators, said: "A true liberal, a friend, a good person. I was fortunate to know Valerio Zanone. He was a great friend. He was a staunch democrat and a true liberal of great intellectual depth. A good person who honoured Italian politics and institutions with great respect and a supreme sense of state." The then PD senator Vannino Chiti commented: "A true pro-European. I was fortunate to know Valerio Zanone personally; he was a liberal democrat, a true intellectual close to pro-European culture. His passing is a loss for our society." Paolo Gentiloni, the then Minister of Foreign Affairs, wrote on Twitter: "A liberal who chose the centre-left. I remember Valerio Zanone, mayor and minister, a cultured and witty Piedmontese, who, as a liberal, chose the centre-left."

In his memory, Rutelli remembered Zanone as a "rare example of liberal and democratic consistency, an irreplaceable person and figure, also for his irony and self-deprecation. A witness to a minority culture in Italy, he brought it to its highest civil and intellectual heights and embodied the liberals' revenge against the totalitarianism of the mass parties of the 20th century." Rutelli expressed his "delight" that Zanone "associated his final parliamentary experience with that of the Daisy party" and recalled that he was "distressed in his final years by the possibility that the Einaudi Foundation would be distorted from its original identity and cultural mission", which Rutelli likened to Benito Mussolini's closure of fellow Piedmontese and Turinese Piero Gobetti's political magazine La Rivoluzione Liberale, stating that this was an issue "far from remote, given the resurgent repression, even in Europe, of freedom of expression and political pluralism, and the arrogant and violent attempt by fundamentalist forces to subordinate the rule of law and democratic freedoms to religious belief."

== Electoral history ==
Election	House	Constituency	Party	Votes	Result
1970	Regional Council of Piedmont	Turin	PLI	6,254	Elected
1975	Regional Council of Piedmont	Turin	PLI	5,511	Elected
1976	Chamber of Deputies	Turin–Novara–Vercelli	PLI	14,665	Elected
1979	Chamber of Deputies	Turin–Novara–Vercelli	PLI	19,821	Elected
1983	Chamber of Deputies	Turin–Novara–Vercelli	PLI	27,844	Elected
1987	Chamber of Deputies	Turin–Novara–Vercelli	PLI	14,005	Elected
1992	Chamber of Deputies	Turin–Novara–Vercelli	PLI	18,419	Elected
2006	Senate of the Republic	Lombardy	DL	– (Note: Elected in a closed list proportional representation system)	Elected
