= DePiero =

DePiero and De Piero is a surname. Notable people with the surname include:

- Dean DePiero (born 1968), American politician
- Gloria De Piero (born 1972), British television and radio presenter, and former Labour Party politician
- Mary DePiero (born 1968), Canadian diver

== See also ==
- De Pietro
