= Centre-right coalition (Italy) =

Political alliance in Italy

Centre-right coalition Coalizione di centro-destra
- Abbreviation: CDX
- Leader: Giorgia Meloni
- Founder: Silvio Berlusconi
- Founded: February 1994
- Political position: Centre to far-right
- Colours: Blue
- Chamber of Deputies: 245 / 400
- Senate of the Republic: 120 / 205
- European Parliament (Note: Including Lega, FI, FdI.): 40 / 76
- Conference of Regions: 14 / 21
- Regional Councils: 476 / 897

The centre-right coalition (Italian: coalizione di centro-destra, CDX) is a political alliance of political parties in Italy active under several forms and names since 1994, when Silvio Berlusconi entered politics and formed the Forza Italia party. It has mostly competed with the centre-left coalition. It is composed of right-leaning parties in the Italian political arena, which generally advocate tax reduction and oppose immigration, and in some cases are eurosceptic. The centre-right coalition has ruled the country for more than twelve years between 1994 and today.

In the 1994 Italian general election, under the leadership of Berlusconi, the centre-right ran with two coalitions, the Pole of Freedoms in Northern Italy and Tuscany (mainly Forza Italia and the Northern League), and the Pole of Good Government (mainly Forza Italia and National Alliance) in Central Italy and Southern Italy. In the 1996 Italian general election, after the Northern League had left in late 1994, the centre-right coalition took the name of Pole for Freedoms. The Northern League returned in 2000, and the coalition was re-formed as the House of Freedoms; this lasted until 2008.

After the fall of the second Prodi government and the 2008 Italian government crisis, the centre-right coalition won the subsequent snap election that was held in April. Since 2008, when Forza Italia and National Alliance merged into The People of Freedom, the coalition has not had official names. A new Forza Italia was formed in late 2013, after the inconclusive 2013 Italian general election that was held earlier that year. For the 2018 Italian general election, it joined forces with Matteo Salvini's Northern League and Giorgia Meloni's Brothers of Italy and a collection of mainly centrist forces named Us with Italy–Union of the Centre.

In 2018, the renamed and rebranded League formed a coalition government with the Five Star Movement and without its centre-right allies, which entered the opposition. This led to a deterioration of the centre-right coalition at a national level, which remained active at a local and regional level. In October 2019, Salvini sought to unite the coalition. This internal crisis further intensified when Forza Italia and the League joined the national unity government of Mario Draghi, while Brothers of Italy remained at the opposition.

During the 2022 Italian general election in September, which was caused by the 2022 Italian government crisis that July, the centre-right coalition re-united and obtained a decisive victory by securing the absolute majority of seats in both chambers. Brothers of Italy emerged as the first party by surpassing the League and gained six million votes in four years. This was the first time the centre-right had won a majority of seats since the 2008 Italian general election.

== History ==
=== Pole of Freedoms and Pole of Good Government ===
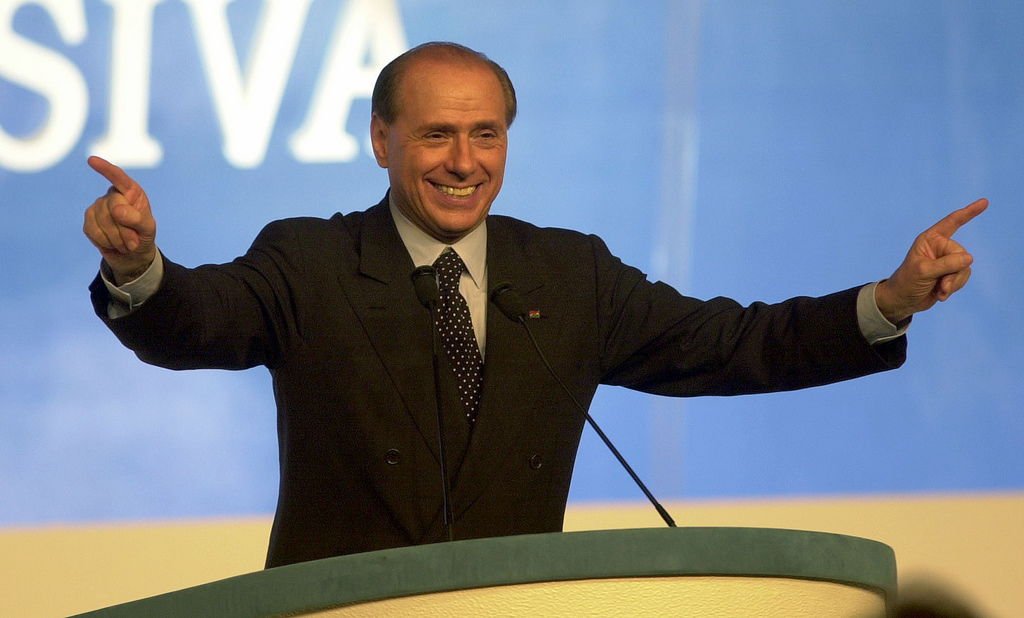
Berlusconi in an electoral convention

In 1994, the media magnate Silvio Berlusconi, who was previously close to the former Italian Socialist Party (PSI) secretary and former prime minister Bettino Craxi and appeared in commercials for the PSI, was studying the possibility of making a political party of his own to avoid what seemed to be the unavoidable victory of the Alliance of Progressives led by Achille Occhetto at the next general election. Three months before the election, he presented his new party, Forza Italia, in a televised announcement on 26 January 1994. Supporters believed that he wanted to avert a victory for the successors of the Italian Communist Party, while opponents believed that he was defending the ancién regime by rebranding it. Regardless of his motives, he employed his power in communication (he owned all of the three main private TV stations in Italy) and advanced communication techniques he and his allies knew very well, as his fortune was largely based on advertisement.

Berlusconi managed to ally himself with both the National Alliance and the Northern League in February 1994, without these being allied with each other. Forza Italia teamed up with the Northern League in Northern Italy, where they competed against the National Alliance, and with the National Alliance in the rest of Italy, where the Northern League was not present. This unusual coalition configuration was caused by the deep hate between the Northern League, which wanted to separate Italy and held Rome in deep contempt, and the nationalist post-fascists in Italy of the National Alliance, the legal successor of the neo-fascist Italian Social Movement. On one occasion, Northern League leader Umberto Bossi encouraged his supporters to go find National-Alliance supporters "house by house", suggesting a lynching that did not actually take place. In the 1994 Italian general election, Berlusconi's coalition won a decisive victory over Occhetto's, becoming the first right-wing coalition to win the general election since the Second World War. In the popular vote, Berlusconi's coalition outpolled the Alliance of Progressives by over 5.1 million votes, and the Pole of Freedoms won in the main regions of Italy.

=== Pole for Freedoms ===
The Pole for Freedoms was formed as a continuation of the Pole of Freedoms and Pole of Good Government coalitions, which had both supported the leadership of Berlusconi at the 1994 general election. As in 1994, there was a separation between the three parties. The Pole of Freedom was constituted by Forza Italia and Northern League, while the Pole of Good Government was formed by Forza Italia and the National Alliance. Afterwards, the Northern League left the coalition at the end of 1994, when the centre-right coalition was forced to reform itself, after the end of the short-lived first Berlusconi government. In the 1995 Italian regional elections, an organic alliance was formed. In 1996, it was officially named Pole for Freedoms and debuted in the 1996 Italian general election, where it was defeated by the centre-left coalition alliance The Olive Tree, whose leader was Romano Prodi.

=== House of Freedoms ===
The House of Freedoms was the successor of the Pole of Freedoms/Pole of Good Government and the Pole for Freedoms. In the run-up of the 2001 Italian general election, after a six-year spell in opposition, which Berlusconi called "the crossing of the desert", he managed to re-unite the coalition under the House of Freedoms banner. According to its leader, the alliance was a broad democratic arch, composed of the democratic right of National Alliance, the democratic centre of Forza Italia, Christian Democratic Centre and United Christian Democrats, and the democratic left represented by the Northern League, the New Italian Socialist Party, and the Italian Republican Party.

The House of Freedoms won the 2001 general election by a landslide and consequently the second Berlusconi government was formed. In government, Forza Italia, whose strongholds included Lombardy in Northern Italy and Sicily in Southern Italy, and the Northern League, which was active only in the Centre-North, formed the "axis of the North" through the special relationship between three Lombards leaders, Berlusconi, Bossi, and Giulio Tremonti; on the other side of the coalition, the National Alliance and the Union of Christian and Centre Democrats, the party emerged from the merger of the Christian Democratic Centre and United Christian Democrats in late 2002, became the natural representatives of Southern interests.

In 2003, the House of Freedoms was routed in local elections by The Olive Tree and the Northern League threatened to pull out. The 2004 European Parliament election in Italy was disappointing for Forza Italia and the coalition as a whole, despite improvements among the other parties. As a result, the Berlusconi and Forza Italia were weaker within the coalition. In the 2005 Italian regional elections, the House of Freedoms lost six of the eight regions it controlled. The defeat was particularly damaging in the South, while the only two regions that the coalition managed to keep, Lombardy and Veneto, were in the North, where the Northern League was decisive. This led to a government crisis, particularly after the Union of Christian and Centre Democrats pulled its ministers out. A few days later, the third Berlusconi government was formed with minor changes from the previous cabinet. In the 2006 Italian general election, the House of Freedoms, which had opened its ranks to a number of minor parties, lost to The Union, a larger, successor version of The Olive Tree.

=== The People of Freedom ===
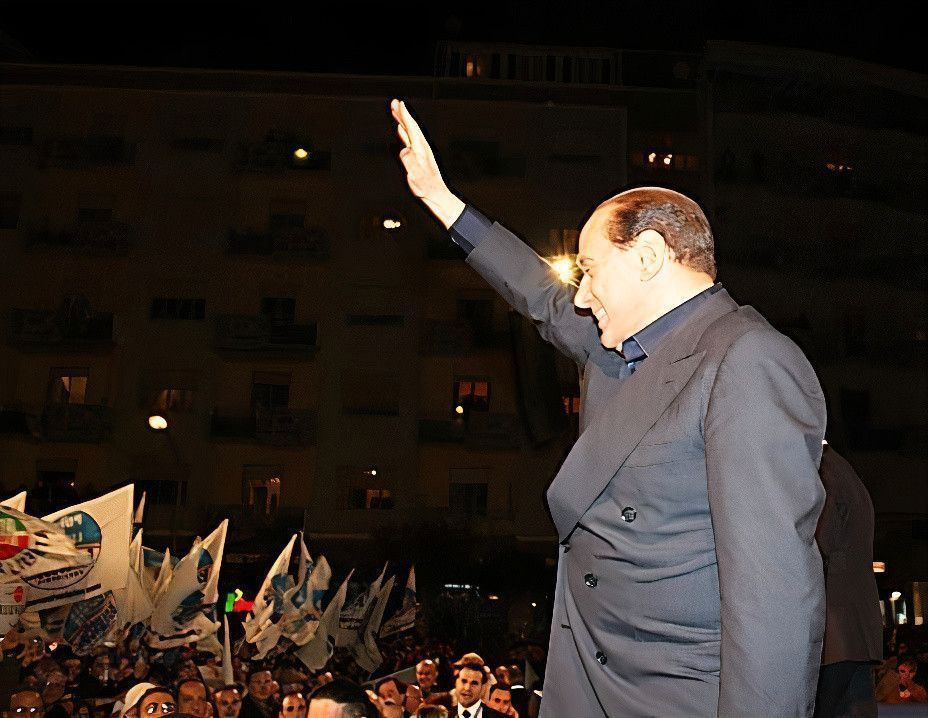
Berlusconi at a rally in 2008

The People of Freedom, which was launched by Berlusconi on 18 November 2007, was initially a federation of political parties, notably including Forza Italia and National Alliance, which participated as a joint election list in the 2008 Italian general election. The federation was later transformed into a party during a party congress on 27–29 March 2009. The Union of Christian and Centre Democrats, which became known as the Union of the Centre, left the centre-right coalition and made an alliance with The Rose for Italy, the Populars' Coordination, and other centrist parties. They later joined the New Pole for Italy in 2010 and With Monti for Italy in 2012.

The People of Freedom led the fourth Berlusconi government from 2008 to 2011 in coalition with the Northern League. In 2010, the Future and Freedom movement, led by the former National Alliance leader Gianfranco Fini, split from the coalition. They joined the Union of the Centre and other parties to form the New Pole for Italy but kept supporting the government. After Berlusconi's resignation during the European debt crisis, the People of Freedom supported Mario Monti's technocratic government in 2011–2012. After the 2013 Italian general election, it became part of Enrico Letta's government of grand coalition with the Democratic Party, Civic Choice, and the Union of the Centre. Angelino Alfano, then party's secretary, functioned as Deputy Prime Minister of Italy and the country's Minister of the Interior.

=== Revival of Forza Italia ===
In June 2013, Berlusconi announced Forza Italia's revival and the PdL's transformation into a centre-right coalition. On 16 November 2013, the People of Freedom's national council voted to dissolve itself and start a new Forza Italia; the assembly was deserted by a group of dissidents, led by Alfano, who had launched the alternative New Centre-Right party the day before.

After the 2016 Italian constitutional referendum, the Union of the Centre left the centre-left coalition and approached the centre-right coalition. In 2017, Civic Choice also joined the centre-right coalition. They ran with the centre-right coalition in the 2017 Sicilian regional election.

=== Centre-right coalitions since 2018 ===
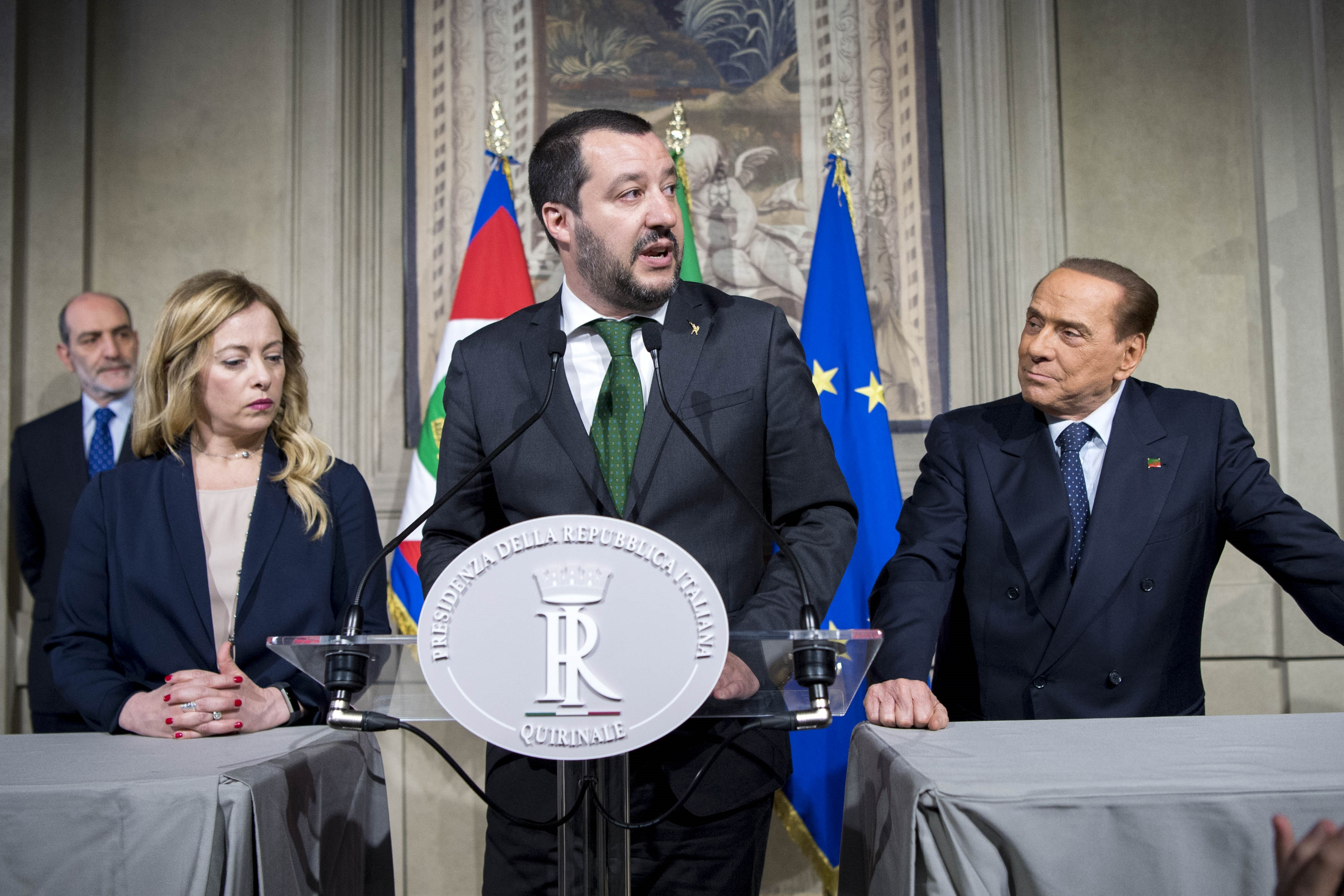
Meloni, Salvini and Berlusconi after the 2018 general election results

Following the 2018 Italian general election, the centre-right coalition, led by Matteo Salvini's League, emerged with a plurality of seats in the Chamber of Deputies and in the Senate, while the anti-establishment Five Star Movement led by Luigi Di Maio became the party with the largest number of votes. Matteo Salvini of the rebranded and renamed League was the largest party within the coalition and thus was their prime ministerial candidate. The centre-left coalition, led by former prime minister Matteo Renzi came third. As no political group or party won an outright majority, it resulted in a hung parliament.

After three months of negotiation, the 2018 Italian government formation concluded when a coalition government, which became known as the Government of Change, was finally formed on 1 June between Di Maio's party and the League, whose leaders both became deputy prime ministers in a government led by the Five Star Movement-linked independent politician Giuseppe Conte as Prime Minister of Italy. This coalition, which caused dissent within the centre-right coalition, lasted until September 2019, and was succeeded by the second Conte government in a centre-left direction.

Following the 2021 Italian government crisis, the previous government was replaced by a national unity government led by Mario Draghi in February 2021. This government included the League and Forza Italia along with the Five Star Movement, the Democratic Party, Article One, and Italia Viva; Brothers of Italy, the National Alliance successor party led by Giorgia Meloni, remained at the opposition. Draghi's government collapsed during the 2022 Italian government crisis in July of that year, and a snap election ensued in September. In the 2022 Italian general election, the centre-right obtained a majority in both houses, with Brothers of Italy as the largest party of the coalition. As a result, Meloni became the new prime minister on 22 October 2022.

The new Meloni government was initially described as the first far-right administration in Italy since the end of the World War II, and the polarizing views of her party on the matters of Italian partisans' movement, workers' and civil rights, assimilation of immigrants and police brutality led to daily controversy with the oppositions. While Meloni presented herself internationally as a moderate, pragmatic eurosceptic, aligned with NATO's and Washington's diplomatic stances, with a laissez-faire attitude in economic and fiscal policies similarly to previous Berlusconi governments, the reception of her domestically was often negative, with low ratings approval starting to show in polls since 2023.

Initially, the main opposition front to Meloni included centre-left parties, now reunited with Five Star Movement and Italia Viva, the CGIL, UIL and USB unions, extra-parliamentary left-wing parties and associations and numerous catholic and non-profit organizations in the country. Action and minor centrist forces chose instead to mantain an attitude of dialogue towards the new government, appreciative some of the newfound, more institutional stances of Meloni. But as more on the furthest right sector inside and outside the centre-right coalition grew unsatisfied, the general-turned-celebrity and Lega's europarliamentarian Roberto Vannacci went on to create the neo-fascist National Future, with the aim of attracting the hardline right voters away from his previous allies. Seen as a betrayer by them, Vannacci distanced himself and his party further away from the government coalition, becoming part of the parliamentary opposition with Broad Camp parties and the centrists.

Conversely Meloni and her allies, dealing with unfavorable polls since the loss of the 2026 constitutional referendum, tried to get the upper hand with the new de-facto bipolarism imposed by her government's new electoral law, under which any coalition that gets first to the 42% threshold, even by a margin of just one vote, wins the majority in both houses. To get to that result, the centre-right tried to counter the great number of official or potential member parties of the Broad Camp by making some new alliances, most notably with Cateno De Luca's South calls North, by allowing them to form a component to lower the signatures required for the upcoming elections, and the civic-inspired movement Mayors of Italy, while the Liberal Democratic Party's leader Luigi Marattin openly expressed interest to an agreement, something opposed by the other half of the party led by Andrea Marcucci. It is unknown if Marco Rizzo's new movement Italy Tomorrow will be part of the coalition, as the FdI-elected senator Antonio Guidi too helped him get a component to lower the requested signatures threshold.

== Composition ==
=== 1994 general election ===
In the 1994 Italian general election, the centre-right coalition ran under the name of Pole of Freedoms in Northern Italy, including the Northern League and leaving out National Alliance, which instead ran alone. In Central Italy and Southern Italy, where the Northern League was not present, the coalition ran under the name of Pole of Good Government, which also included National Alliance.

The Pole of Freedoms was composed of four parties:

Party	Main ideology	Leader
Forza Italia (FI)	Liberal conservatism	Silvio Berlusconi
Northern League (LN)	Regionalism	Umberto Bossi
Christian Democratic Centre (CCD)	Christian democracy	Pier Ferdinando Casini
Union of the Centre (UdC)	Liberalism	Raffaele Costa

The Pole of Good Government was instead composed of six parties:

Party	Main ideology	Leader
Forza Italia (FI)	Liberal conservatism	Silvio Berlusconi
National Alliance (AN) (Note: Including also the Italian Liberal Right.)	National conservatism	Gianfranco Fini
Christian Democratic Centre (CCD)	Christian democracy	Pier Ferdinando Casini
Union of the Centre (UdC)	Liberalism	Raffaele Costa
Liberal Democratic Pole (PLD)	Liberalism	Adriano Teso

=== 1996 general election ===
In the 1996 Italian general election, the Pole for Freedoms was composed of the following parties:

Party	Main ideology	Leader
Forza Italia (FI) (Note: Including also the List for Trieste, the Liberal Democratic Foundation and the Union of the Centre.)	Liberal conservatism	Silvio Berlusconi
National Alliance (AN) (Note: Including also the Italian Liberal Right.)	National conservatism	Gianfranco Fini
Christian Democratic Centre (CCD) (Note: The two parties contested the election in a joint list, including also the Federalist Greens.)	Christian democracy	Pier Ferdinando Casini
United Christian Democrats (CDU)	Christian democracy	Rocco Buttiglione
Federalist Party (PF)	Federalism	Gianfranco Miglio

The coalition made an agreement of desistance with the Pannella–Sgarbi List in some constituencies.

=== 2001 general election ===
In the 2001 Italian general election, the House of Freedoms was composed of seven parties:

Party	Main ideology	Leader
Forza Italia (FI) (Note: Including also the Italian Republican Party, the Christian Democratic Party, the Christian Democrats for Freedom, the List for Trieste and The Liberals Sgarbi.)	Liberal conservatism	Silvio Berlusconi
National Alliance (AN) (Note: Including also the Liberal Right – Liberals for Italy.)	National conservatism	Gianfranco Fini
Northern League (LN) (Note: Including also the Trentino Tyrolean Autonomist Party and the Lega Sud Ausonia.)	Regionalism	Umberto Bossi
Christian Democratic Centre (CCD) (Note: The two parties contested the election in a joint list informally called White Flower, including also the Federalist Greens.)	Christian democracy	Pier Ferdinando Casini
United Christian Democrats (CDU)	Christian democracy	Rocco Buttiglione
New Italian Socialist Party (NPSI)	Social democracy	Gianni De Michelis
Scorporo Abolition (AS) (Note: Scorporo Abolition was a lista civetta.)	Single-issue politics	None

The coalition presented a candidate a member of the Sardinian Reformers in Sardinia. It also made an agreement of desistance with the Tricolour Flame in one constituency in Sicily.

=== 2006 general election ===
In the 2006 Italian general election, the House of Freedoms was composed of the following parties:

Party	Main ideology	Leader
Forza Italia (FI)	Liberal conservatism	Silvio Berlusconi
National Alliance (AN)	National conservatism	Gianfranco Fini
Union of Christian and Centre Democrats (UDC) (Note: The list included also the Sardinian Reformers.)	Christian democracy	Pier Ferdinando Casini
Northern League (LN) (Note: The two parties formed a joint list. The list included also the Sardinian Action Party.)	Regionalism	Umberto Bossi
Movement for Autonomy (MpA)	Regionalism	Raffaele Lombardo
Christian Democracy for Autonomies (DCA) (Note: DCA and NPSI contested the election in a joint list that included also the Autonomist People's Union.)	Christian democracy	Gianfranco Rotondi
New Italian Socialist Party (NPSI)	Social democracy	Gianni De Michelis
Social Alternative (AS) (Note: List composed of Social Action, New Force and the National Front.)	Neo-fascism	Alessandra Mussolini
Tricolour Flame (FT) (Note: Including CasaPound.)	Neo-fascism	Luca Romagnoli
No Euro Movement (MNE)	Euroscepticism	Renzo Rabellino
United Pensioners (PU)	Pensioners' interests	Filippo De Jorio
Democratic Ecologists (ED) (Note: Including the Greens Greens.)	Green liberalism	Laura Scalabrini
Italian Liberal Party (PLI)	Liberalism	Stefano De Luca
S.O.S. Italy (SOS)	Consumer protection	Diego Volpe Pasini
Italian Republican Party (PRI) (Note: The party also presented some of its candidates in Forza Italia's lists.)	Liberalism	Francesco Nucara
New Sicily (NS) (Note: The party ran only in Sicily.)	Regionalism	Bartolo Pellegrino
Pact for Sicily (PpS)	Regionalism	Nicolò Nicolosi
Extended Christian Pact (PACE)	Christian democracy	Gilberto Perri
Liberal Reformers (RL)	Liberalism	Benedetto Della Vedova
For Italy in the World (Note: The party ran only in the overseas constituencies.)	Interests of Italians abroad	Mirko Tremaglia

The House of Freedoms was also supported by Unitalia, by Italy Again and by the National Democratic Party.

=== 2008 general election ===
Berlusconi launched The People of Freedom in late 2007; this was joined by FI, AN and minor parties, and continued its alliance with the LN.

In the 2008 Italian general election, the coalition was composed of three parties:

Party	Main ideology	Leader
The People of Freedom (PdL) (Note: The list, which would be transformed into a party in 2009, included Forza Italia, National Alliance, the Liberal Populars, Christian Democracy for Autonomies, the New Italian Socialist Party, the Italian Republican Party, the Liberal Reformers, the Pensioners' Party, the Liberal Democrats, Federation of Christian Populars, Decide!, Italians in the World, Social Action (formerly part of Social Alternative), the Libertarian Right, the Reformist Socialists and Fortza Paris. Not all of these parties would be officially merged into a joint party in 2009. The PdL was also supported by Christian Democracy, after being excluded by the Ministry of the Interior from the electoral competition because of the similarity of its symbol with that of the UDC and the Italian Democratic Socialist Party in Lombardy. The Sardinian Reformers tried to form an alliance, but talks failed. Also the Union of the Centre refused to join forces (and was joined by the Sardinian Reformers).)	Liberal conservatism	Silvio Berlusconi
Northern League (LN) (Note: Including also the Federalist Alliance.)	Regionalism	Umberto Bossi
Movement for Autonomy (MpA) (Note: The party was based in Sicily, but fielded lists everywhere the LN was not present. It included minor parties, like Third Pole and the Southern Action League, and was supported by the Italian Democratic Socialist Party in Sicily.)	Regionalism	Raffaele Lombardo

=== 2013 general election ===
In the 2013 Italian general election, the coalition was composed of the following parties:

Party	Main ideology	Leader
The People of Freedom (Note: The list was supported by the Italian Democratic Socialist Party and the Christian Democratic Party and included the Union of Democrats for Europe, the New Italian Socialist Party, Christian Democracy, Cantiere Popolare, the Movement for Autonomies, Fortza Paris and the Federation of Christian Populars.) (PdL)	Liberal conservatism	Silvio Berlusconi
Northern League (Note: The list included the Labour and Freedom List and was supported by Fassa Association.) (LN)	Regionalism	Roberto Maroni
Brothers of Italy (FdI)	National conservatism	Giorgia Meloni
The Right (LD)	Right-wing populism	Francesco Storace
Great South (GS) (Note: GS and MpA contested the election in a joint list for the Chamber and in separate lists for the Senate.)	Regionalism	Gianfranco Micciché
Moderates in Revolution (MIR)	Liberal conservatism	Gianpiero Samorì
Pensioners' Party (PP)	Pensioners' interests	Carlo Fatuzzo
Popular Agreement (IP) (Note: Including Social Justice and Christian Democracy.)	Christian democracy	Giampiero Catone
Enough taxes! (BT)	Anti-tax	Luciano Garatti
Party of Sicilians–MPA (PdS–MPA)	Regionalism	Raffaele Lombardo
Free for a Fair Italy (LIE) (Note: The party contested only in Campania.)	Liberalism	Angelo Pisani

=== 2018 general election ===
In the 2018 Italian general election, the coalition was composed of five parties:

Party	Main ideology	Leader
League (Lega) (Note: Including the National Movement for Sovereignty (MNS), the Italian Liberal Party (PLI), Us with Salvini (NcS), the Sardinian Action Party (PSd'Az) and was supported by the Citizens' Union for South Tyrol (BUfS) and the Popular Autonomists.)	Right-wing populism	Matteo Salvini
Forza Italia (FI) (Note: Including Energies for Italy, The Liberals, Christian Revolution, the Pensioners' Party, the Animalist Movement, Renaissance, the Italian Reformists, the Moderates in Revolution, the New Italian Socialist Party, Fassa Association, dissidents of the Italian Republican Party and was supported by the Italian Democratic Socialist Party and the Greens Greens.)	Liberal conservatism	Silvio Berlusconi
Brothers of Italy (FdI) (Note: Including also Alto Adige in the Heart, Social Right, Diventerà Bellissima, Making Front, National Freedom, Right Renewal, National Flame and Long Live Italy.)	National conservatism	Giorgia Meloni
Us with Italy – UDC (NcI–UDC) (Note: Including Direction Italy (including Responsible Autonomy and the Sardinian Reformers), Civic Choice, Act!, Cantiere Popolare, the Movement for Autonomies, splinters from Popular Alternative, Union of Democrats for Europe, the Union of the Centre, Identity and Action, New CDU and was supported by the Autonomist People's Union.)	Liberal conservatism, Christian democracy	Raffaele Fitto

=== 2022 general election ===
In the 2022 Italian general election, the coalition was composed of four parties:

Party	Main ideology	Leader
Brothers of Italy (FdI) (Note: Including also Green is Popular, Human Value Party and Diventerà Bellissima.)	National conservatism	Giorgia Meloni
League (Lega) (Note: Including also Sardinian Action Party, Italian Liberal Right and Fassa Association.)	Right-wing populism	Matteo Salvini
Forza Italia (FI) (Note: Including also New Italian Socialist Party and Animalist Movement; supported by the Italian Liberal Party.)	Liberal conservatism	Silvio Berlusconi
Us Moderates (NM) (Note: Electoral list composed of Us with Italy (NcI), Italy in the Centre (IaC), Coraggio Italia (CI) and Union of the Centre (UdC). Including also Cambiamo! (C!), Vinciamo Italia (VI), Identity and Action (IDeA), Cantiere Popolare (CP), Popular Liguria (LP) and Party of Europeans and Liberals (PEL).)	Liberal conservatism, Christian democracy	Maurizio Lupi

== Electoral results ==
=== Italian Parliament ===
Election	Leader	Chamber of Deputies					Senate of the Republic				
Election	Leader	Votes	%	Seats	+/–	Position	Votes	%	Seats	+/–	Position
1994	Silvio Berlusconi	16,475,191	46.4	366 / 630	New	1st	14,110,705	42.5	156 / 315	New	1st
1996	Silvio Berlusconi	17,947,445	43.2	246 / 630	▼120	▼2nd	12,694,846	38.9	117 / 315	▼39	▼2nd
2001	Silvio Berlusconi	18,569,126	50.0	368 / 630	▲122	▲1st	17,255,734	50.4	176 / 315	▲59	▲1st
2006	Silvio Berlusconi	18,995,697	49.7	281 / 630	▼87	▼2nd	17,359,754	50.2	156 / 315	▼20	1st
2008	Silvio Berlusconi	17,064,506	46.8	344 / 630	▲43	▲1st	15,508,899	47.3	174 / 315	▲18	1st
2013	Silvio Berlusconi	9,923,109	29.2	126 / 630	▼218	▼2nd	9,405,679	30.7	118 / 315	▼46	▼2nd
2018	Matteo Salvini (Note: Under the current agreement of the centre-right coalition, the leader of the party that wins the most votes within the coalition becomes the candidate for Prime Minister.)	12,152,345	37.0	265 / 630	▲139	▲1st	11,327,549	37.5	135 / 315	▲17	▲1st
2022	Giorgia Meloni	12,300,244	43.8	237 / 400	▼28	1st	12,129,547	44.0	115 / 200	▼20	1st

=== Regional Councils ===
Region	Election year	Votes	%	Seats	+/−
Aosta Valley	2025	17,762 (2nd)	29.4	11 / 35	Steady
Piedmont	2024	936,099 (1st)	56.6	31 / 51	▼2
Lombardy	2023	1,621,095 (1st)	56.3	49 / 80	Steady
South Tyrol (Note: In South Tyrol the centre-right coalition ran divided.)	2023	28,514	10.1	3 / 35	▼2
Trentino	2023	122,398 (1st)	52.6	21 / 35	Steady
Veneto	2025	1,103,014 (1st)	65.9	34 / 51	▼7
Friuli-Venezia Giulia	2023	250,903 (1st)	63.5	29 / 49	Steady
Emilia-Romagna	2024	594,553 (2nd)	39.8	15 / 50	▼4
Liguria	2024	271,809 (1st)	48.3	17 / 31	▼2
Tuscany	2025	518,976 (2nd)	40.9	16 / 41	▲2
Marche	2025	305,104 (1st)	53.8	20 / 31	Steady
Umbria	2024	151,899 (2nd)	47.5	8 / 21	▼5
Lazio	2023	855,450 (1st)	55.3	31 / 51	▲16
Abruzzo	2024	316,637 (1st)	54.7	18 / 31	Steady
Molise	2023	91,278 (1st)	64.5	14 / 21	▲1
Campania	2025	708,190 (2nd)	35.2	18 / 51	▲7
Apulia	2025	488,896 (2nd)	36.8	21 / 51	▲3
Basilicata	2024	150,381 (1st)	57.5	13 / 21	Steady
Calabria	2025	440,052 (1st)	58.0	21 / 31	Steady
Sicily	2022	887,215 (1st)	42.0	40 / 70	▲4
Sardinia	2024	333,873 (1st) (Note: The centre-right coalition won the party vote but lost the presidential election.)	48.8	24 / 60	▼12
