= Federation of Liberals =

Italian political party

Federation of Liberals Federazione dei Liberali
- Leaders: Raffaello Morelli; Valerio Zanone
- Founded: 6 February 1994
- Dissolved: c. 2014
- Preceded by: Italian Liberal Party
- Headquarters: Via Laurina 20; 00187 Rome
- Ideology: Liberalism
- Political position: Centre
- National affiliation: ULD (1995); Ulivo (1995–1996); PRI (1999); DL (2001–2004); FdLD (2004); Unione (2004–2006); SE (2014)
- International affiliation: Liberal International
- Colors: Blue

The Federation of Liberals (Italian: Federazione dei Liberali, FdL) was a minor liberal political party in Italy founded on 6 February 1994 after the dissolution of the Italian Liberal Party (PLI). The FdL soon found itself divided among which political alliance join in the nascent Second Italian Republic but ultimately sided with the centre-left coalition in 1996, while many other members of the PLI had joined the Silvio Berlusconi-led centre-right coalition in 1994.

The FdL promoted liberal, social liberal, liberal-democratic, and pro-European positions, representing the centrist wing of the centre-left coalition. It was never able to replicate the success of the PLI, failing to join the Italian Parliament in 1996 and the European Parliament in 1999, 2004, and 2014, and was quietly dissolved.

== History ==
The FdL was founded on 6 February 1994 as the legal successor of the PLI. Alfredo Biondi, incumbent president of the PLI, was elected president and Raffaello Morelli coordinator. In the 1994 Italian general election, most FdL members supported the Segni Pact (PS), while Biondi and some gathered in the Union of the Centre (UdC) were elected with Forza Italia (FI). The FdL failed to file lists for the 1994 European Parliament election in Italy. In 1995, the party was joined by the Liberal Democratic Union (ULD), whose leader Valerio Zanone was elected president, replacing Antonio Baslini.

In the 1996 Italian general election, Zanone and Morelli sided the FdL with the centre-left coalition, at that time known as The Olive Tree and led by Romano Prodi, and more specifically with the Democratic Union (UD). In the 1999 European Parliament election in Italy, the party formed a joint list with the Italian Republican Party (PRI). In both cases, no party members were elected, and the FdL failed to impose itself within the centre-left coalition or achieve results similar to the PLI. In the 2001 Italian general election, the FdL sided with Democracy is Freedom – The Daisy (DL). Zanone, a keen supporter of that alliance, joined the DL's national board in 2002, and was elected to the Senate of the Republic in the 2006 Italian general election.

Morelli was more critical of the DL. Although the majority of the party sided with him, the final fracture with Zanone happened only in 2005. In the 2004 European Parliament election in Italy, the FdL had formed joint lists with the Federation of Liberal Democrats (FdLD). After that, the party remained active for several years within centre-left politics, including The Union, while expressing criticism towards an indistinct ulivismo, criticising the domination of The Olive Tree party (the union between the DL and the Democrats of the Left, DS) and later of the Democratic Party (PD, the merge of the DL and the DS), and lamented the lack of a more liberal perspective within the centre-left coalition. It was ideologically close to the European Liberal Democrat and Reform Party (ELDR) and was a member of the Liberal International, and suffered a steady decline until its de facto dissolution around 2014. It last took part to the European Choice (SE) alliance for the 2014 European Parliament election in Italy.

== Leadership ==
- President: Alfredo Biondi (1994), Antonio Baslini (1994–1995), Valerio Zanone (1995–2004), Raffaello Morelli (2005–c. 2014)
- Coordinator/Secretary: Raffello Morelli (1994–2005)
