= Leone Cattani =

Italian lawyer and politician

Secretary of the Italian Liberal Party
- In office December 1944 – December 1945
- Preceded by: Manlio Brosio
- Succeeded by: Giovanni Cassandro

Minister of Public Works
- In office 10 December 1945 – 1 July 1946
- Preceded by: Giuseppe Romita

Personal details
- Born: 5 January 1906 Rieti, Lazio, Italy
- Died: 29 October 1980 (aged 74) Rome, Italy
- Party: PLI (1943–1948; 1951–1955); PR (1955–1961); PSDI (from 1963)
- Spouse: Maria Ruffini (m. 1940)
- Children: Umberto (1941–1969); Paolo (born 1943); Giorgio (born 1945)
- Parent(s): Antonio Cattani (1873–1939); Maria Costantini
- Occupation: Lawyer politician

Leone Cattani (5 January 1906 – 29 October 1980) was an Italian lawyer, politician and anti-Fascist activist.

Between December 1944 and December 1945 he served as secretary general of the Italian Liberal Party. Later, in 1955, he was a co-founder of the Italian Radical Party.

== Life ==
=== Family provenance and early years ===
Leone Cattani was born in Rieti, a small industrial city and regional capital a short distance to the north of Rome. He was the youngest of the four recorded children of Antonio Cattani (1873–1939), a primary school teacher (later a director of studies), originally from nearby Antrodoco. His mother, born Maria Costantini, came from a Rieti family. For work reasons, while he was growing up, the family relocated to Urbino, later moving further afield to Crema in the north-west of Italy (Lombardy).

The move to Crema meant living close to Milan, which is where Cattani undertook his university studies, receiving a degree in social sciences in 1925 and in jurisprudence in 1927. It was while he was a student that he became politically involved, joining Catholic associations. Cattani was influenced by the liberal ideas of Benedetto Croce and Luigi Einaudi. He became an activist and then a leading figure in the Catholic Federation of University Students ("Federazione Universitaria Cattolica Italiana"; FUCI), expressing hostility within the federation to the Fascists who had been running the government since 1922. He was also a promoter of the "Golliardic Union for Liberty" ("Unione goliardica per la libertà"), an association of socialist and liberal Catholics which had been founded in 1924.

=== The antifascist ===
The FUCI had traditionally valued its political neutrality, but the growing intrusiveness of the Fascist government was hard to ignore, which was reflected in internal conflicts within "the federation", and in 1926 Cattani resigned from it. In September 1927 he returned to live in Rieti. Drawn towards liberal perspectives, he became one of the youthful supporters of Giovanni Amendola. Others in the group included Ugo La Malfa and Giorgio Amendola.

On 28 April 1928 a bomb exploded at the opening ceremony of the Milan trade fair. It was determined that the explosion was an assassination attempt against the king. The king was unhurt, but 80 people were injured and 20 were killed. The Mussolini government took the opportunity to round up a large number of political activists known to be hostile to the Fascist Party. Cattani was among those arrested, accused of having set up a secret "Young Italy" association. Without proof or other justification he was detained for 35 days, after which he was freed. He nevertheless had lost his job with the National Institute for Exports.

In March 1930 he relocated to Rome. During the 1930s, Cattani concentrated on working as a defence lawyer: many of his clients were antifascists. Inspired by Benedetto Croce he continued, quietly, to support the liberal doctrines. He also became involved in clandestine resistance activities, although clandestine resistance appears to have been far more active following the outbreak of war, in the early 1940s, than during the 1930s.

=== Family matters ===
His father, Antonio, died on 9 October 1939. A year later, on 26 October 1940, Leone Cattani married Maria Ruffini from Portici (Naples). The marriage produced three sons.

=== War years ===
By 1942 he was organising "actions" against the government. He refused to join his group of young liberals to the new Action Party because he believed that the republican aspirations of its leaders, notably Ugo La Malfa and Ferruccio Parri, would rule out the creation of a broadly based anti-Fascist party capable of attracting middle class voters who were still, in his judgement, predominantly monarchist. What emerged from this difference of approach would be two radically different political forces claiming the mantle of liberalism: the liberal-socialist Action Party (1942–1947) and the liberal-conservative Italian Liberal Party, relaunched in 1943 and which would limp on until 1994, but without ever securing much more than 5% of the national vote.

Cattani was the liberal representative on Ivanoe Bonomi's antifascist committee on 25 July 1943. After the fall of Mussolini he joined with Nicolò Carandini, Giambattista Rizzo, Mario Pannunzio and others to reconstruct the Italian Liberal Party. He opposed joining the Badoglio government, which differentiated him from the "grand old men" of liberalism Alessandro Casati and Marcello Soleri. At the end of the summer, after 18 September 1943, Cattani joined the Italian Liberal Party to the newly formed (and in political terms broadly based) National Liberation Committee ("Comitato di Liberazione Nazionale"; CLN).

At the time of the brief but savage German occupation of Rome Cattani contributed to the clandestine underground publication of the "Liberal Movement of Italy" programmes and, together with Mario Pannunzio, of "Risorgimento Liberale" which after the liberation of Rome became the official organ of the Italian Liberal Party.

=== Politics after Mussolini ===
Taking his cue from Croce and Einaudi, Cattani always defended democracy against the excesses of Fascism and Communism, continuing to favour a progressive and reforming model of liberalism. In December 1944 Brosio joined the (second) Bonomi government while Cattani became secretary general of the Italian Liberal Party: with fascism apparently vanquished, he identified Communism as the more pressing danger, and worked to limit the powers of the CLN, which was dominated by the Italian Communist Party, and for its dissolution following Liberation (25 April 1945).

Directly after the war Cattani was a member of the (nominated, not elected) National Council ("Consulta Nazionale") established in September 1945, and he saw to it that his party was part of the short-lived Parri government to represent the (non-Communist) left-wing wing of the CLN. For Cattani participation in the government was a necessary precondition for the creation of a more moderate Christian Democratic-Liberal government headed up by Alcide De Gasperi. In pursuit of that objective he then launched a campaign against the Parri government, from which on 21 November 1945 the liberal ministers resigned, provoking a crisis.

On 10 December 1945 a new government under De Gasperi took over, created from the six parties of the CLN, which had the backing of the occupying powers. There was pressure from the right-wing parties in this very broadly based coalition for Cattani to be excluded from it and for the Liberal Party to go into opposition, but in the end Cattani joined the government as Minister of Public Works, while his duties as party general secretary passed to Giovanni Cassandro.

=== Referendum and resignation ===
The referendum of 2 June 1946 was held to determine the future of the monarchy and, more broadly, to confer democratic legitimacy on the constitutional arrangements that would follow. Of the six political parties represented in the CLN there was only one, the Liberal Party, backing the retention of the monarchy in the campaigning ahead of the vote. Directly after the fall of the monarchy, Cattani committed to back an investigation into Fraud allegations from the monarchist side. During the sessions of the Council of Ministers held overnight on 12/13 June 1946 he was the only member of the government to vote against the taking of power by De Gasperi as provisional head of state. Nevertheless, once the Republic had been proclaimed, Cattani quickly became a foremost defender of the state's legitimacy in the face of proposals to undergo further discussions ahead of a second referendum. At the end of 1947 he emerged as a leading champion of the liberal left at the fourth Liberal Party national congress: as the political mood in the country drifted to the left, the Liberal Party moved in the opposite direction. Following a victory by the "right", in a vote over a proposed merger with the populist Common Man's Front ("Fronte dell'Uomo Qualunque"; UQ), Cattani resigned from the Liberal Party early in 1948, alleging, as he did, that the vote at the party congress had been manipulated.

As leader of the "Liberal Revival Movement" (" movimento di Rinascita liberale") in 1948, it seemed that Cattani was on the way to launching a new alternative liberal party, but faced with hesitancy among political allies he abandoned the idea. When in June 1948 Nicolò Carandini took the initiative and launched the Independent Liberal Movement ("Movimento Liberale Indipendente"; MLI), Cattani stood aside from the project and for several years withdrew completely from the political scene. His energies were instead diverted to a new political weekly magazine, "Il Mondo" from the pages of which he argued his liberal position with some fervour.

=== Return to the Liberal Party and establishment of the Radical Party ===
In 1950, following the removal of party General Secretary Roberto Lucifero (who represented the extreme right of the Liberal Party) and the arrival in the post of Bruno Villabruna, who subsequently launched a determined move to make the party more mainstream, attempting to create a broadly based political "third force", Cattani was among those who began to look for ways of drawing together the fractured strands of political liberalism. Through the MLI he set out his conditions for a liberal reunification, calling for a new Italian Liberal organisation that completely excluded the political right. Despite failing to obtain agreement on that, in December 1951 at the party conference in Turin, Cattani was among those calling for a liberal reunification.

In 1952 Cattani presented himself as a candidate in the Rome municipal elections, standing as a candidate for a coalition comprising the Liberals, the Christian Democrats, the Republicans and the Social Democrats. These parties agreed, under the terms of the newly introduced electoral law, than they would all support the incumbent mayor, Salvatore Rebecchini. Cattani's own candidacy was successful: having been elected to the council he was subsequently given responsibility for Planning and Private Building. After less than a year he resigned from this office, however, in order to avoid having any involvement in condoning a major building project on the Monte Mario hill. Over the next few years he thundered periodically from the back benches in the council chamber against public corruption and the widespread construction of unauthorized buildings, but this was met with widespread indifference.

As a supporter of the Electoral Law ("Fraud Law"; "legge truffa") of 1953, Cattani soon found himself at odds with the Liberal Party mainstream again, especially after 1954 when Giovanni Malagodi took over as Party General Secretary. This led to Cattani's final break with the party which he left at the end of 1955, along with others on the left wing of the party, including Bruno Villabruna, to found the Radical Party.

=== The Radical politician ===
The Radical Party was officially launched at the Cola di Rienzo Theatre in Rome on 10 December 1955. Immediately afterwards Cattani stood for election to the Rome city council as a Radical candidate and in 1956 he was re-elected to the council despite the disappointing overall result for the new party which received only 1.2% of the votes. From the opposition benches he was particularly fierce in opposing the urban policies of the Christian Democrats under mayors Tupini and Ciocchetti. His successful battle to prevent the Villa Chigi redevelopment was particularly memorable. In 1958 he was the left-wing mayoral candidate, backed by the Socialists, the Communists, the Republicans and the Radicals, although the vote that year led to the election as mayor of the centre-right Christian Democrat, Urbano Ciocchetti.

Cattani's "radical adventure" also proved short-lived. In 1961 the "Piccardi case" surfaced in the columns of "Il Mondo". The managing editor of the magazine was Mario Pannunzio, a close political ally of Cattani's. Leopoldo Piccardi, a member of the Radical Party secretariat, was accused of having been involved in Italo-German discussions in 1938/39 in which racial arguments had been addressed. Cattani and others associated with "Il Mondo" demanded Piccardi's resignation, but the left wing of the party backed him. The upshot was another party resignation for Leone Cattani.

=== Retreat into private life ===
After the termination of his political career in the Radical Party, in 1963 Cattani ran as a candidate for Giuseppe Saragat's Italian Democratic Socialist Party (PSDI), but he failed to secure election. This, for most purposes, signalled his retreat into private life. In 1968 he was one of the promoters of the Pannunzio Centre at Turin, along with Arrigo Olivetti, Nicolò Carandini, Pier Franco Quaglieni and Mario Soldati.

Leone Cattani died at Rome on 29 October 1980.
