= Scelba government =

10th government of the Italian Republic

Scelba Cabinet
- 10th Cabinet of Italy

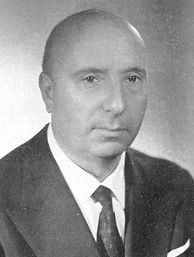
- Date formed: 10 February 1954
- Date dissolved: 6 July 1955

People and organisations
- Head of state: Luigi Einaudi; Giovanni Gronchi
- Head of government: Mario Scelba
- Total no. of members: 20
- Member parties: DC, PSDI, PLI
- Status in legislature: Coalition government

History
- Legislature term: Legislature II (1953–1958)
- Predecessor: Fanfani I Cabinet
- Successor: Segni I Cabinet

The Scelba government was the 10th cabinet of the Italian Republic, that held office from 10 February 1954 to 6 July 1955, for a total of 511 days (or 1 year, 4 months and 26 days).

After the election of Giovanni Gronchi as new president of Italy, Scelba resigned as prime minister.

== Government parties ==
The government was composed by the following parties:

Party	Ideology	Leader
Christian Democracy (DC)	Christian democracy	Amintore Fanfani
Italian Democratic Socialist Party (PSDI)	Social democracy	Giuseppe Saragat
Italian Liberal Party (PLI)	Liberalism	Giovanni Malagodi

== Party breakdown ==
- Christian Democracy (DC): prime minister, 13 ministers and 30 undersecretaries
- Italian Democratic Socialist Party (PSDI): deputy prime minister, 3 ministers and 4 undersecretaries
- Italian Liberal Party (PLI): 3 ministers and 2 undersecretaries

== Composition ==
Office	Name	Party	Term
Prime Minister	Mario Scelba	DC	10 February 1954–6 July 1955
Deputy Prime Minister	Giuseppe Saragat	PSDI	10 February 1954–6 July 1955
Minister of Foreign Affairs	Attilio Piccioni	DC	10 February 1954–16 September 1954
Minister of Foreign Affairs	Gaetano Martino	PLI	16 September 1954–6 July 1955
Minister of the Interior	Mario Scelba (ad interim)	DC	10 February 1954–6 July 1955
Minister of Grace and Justice	Michele De Pietro	DC	10 February 1954–6 July 1955
Minister of Budget	Ezio Vanoni	DC	10 February 1954–6 July 1955
Minister of Finance	Roberto Tremelloni	PSDI	10 February 1954–6 July 1955
Minister of Treasury	Silvio Gava	DC	10 February 1954–6 July 1955
Minister of Defence	Paolo Emilio Taviani	DC	10 February 1954–6 July 1955
Minister of Public Education	Gaetano Martino	PLI	10 February 1954–19 September 1954
Minister of Public Education	Giuseppe Ermini	DC	19 September 1954–6 July 1955
Minister of Public Works	Giuseppe Romita	PSDI	10 February 1954–6 July 1955
Minister of Agriculture and Forests	Giuseppe Medici	DC	10 February 1954–6 July 1955
Minister of Transport	Bernardo Mattarella	DC	10 February 1954–6 July 1955
Minister of Post and Telecommunications	Gennaro Cassiani	DC	10 February 1954–6 July 1955
Minister of Industry and Commerce	Bruno Villabruna	PLI	10 February 1954–6 July 1955
Minister of Foreign Trade	Mario Martinelli	DC	10 February 1954–6 July 1955
Minister of Merchant Navy	Fernando Tambroni	DC	10 February 1954–6 July 1955
Minister of Labour and Social Security	Ezio Vigorelli	PSDI	10 February 1954–6 July 1955
Minister for the Fund for the South (without portfolio)	Pietro Campilli	DC	10 February 1954–6 July 1955
Minister for Parliamentary Relations (without portfolio)	Raffaele De Caro	PLI	10 February 1954–6 July 1955
Minister for Public Administration Reform (without portfolio)	Umberto Tupini	DC	10 February 1954–6 July 1955
Minister of Tourism, Sport and Entertainment (without portfolio)	Giovanni Ponti	DC	10 February 1954–6 July 1955
Secretary of the Council of Ministers	Oscar Luigi Scalfaro	DC	10 February 1954–6 July 1955
