= Vittorio Badini Confalonieri =

Italian politician and lawyer

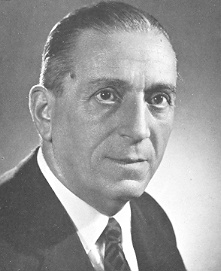
Vittorio Badini Confalonieri

Vittorio Badini Confalonieri (14 March 1914 – 3 August 1993) was an Italian politician and lawyer.

Confalonieri was born in Turin in 1914. He was elected to the Constituent Assembly of Italy in 1946 and subsequently to the Chamber of Deputies from 1953 to 1976.

He served as Undersecretary for Grace and Justice in the fourth De Gasperi government, as Undersecretary for Foreign Affairs in the Scelba Government and in the first Segni Government and as Minister of Tourism and Entertainment in the second Andreotti government.

He was also national president of the Italian Liberal Party from 1967 to 1972, succeeding Gaetano Martino.

== Honours and awards ==
- Italy: Knight of the Grand Cross of the Order of Merit of the Italian Republic (5 July 1976)
- Italy: Grand Officer of the Order of Merit of the Italian Republic (30 December 1952)
