= Anna Cinzia Bonfrisco =

Italian politician

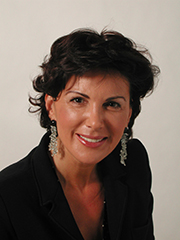

Member of the European Parliament for Central Italy
- In office 2 July 2019 – 9 June 2024

Member of the Senate
- In office 28 April 2006 – 1 July 2019

Personal details
- Born: 12 October 1962 (age 63)
- Party: PSI (until 1994); FI (1994–2009); PdL (2009–2013); FI (2013–2015); CoR (2015–2016); DLI (2016–present); Lega (2018–present)
- Profession: University professor, Company Manager

Anna Cinzia Bonfrisco (born 12 October 1962 in Riva del Garda) is an Italian politician.

In the 2006 general election she was elected senator on the Forza Italia list. She was re-elected in the 2008 and 2013 general elections.

On 3 June 2015 she left Forza Italia to join the Conservatives and Reformists party, of which she became the group leader in the Senate. In December 2016 she abandoned CoR and officially enrolled in the Italian Liberal Party. In 2018 she was elected Senator for the fourth time, on the League list.

In 2019 she was elected as a member of the European Parliament in 2019.
