= Raffaele De Caro =

Italian politician

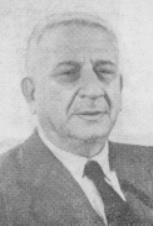
Raffaele De Caro

Raffaele De Caro (29 March 1883 – 3 June 1961) was an Italian politician.

Started in Freemasonry in the Loggia Manfredi of Benevento on 18 October 1911, he became Mason Master on 9 November 1912 and after his death he was named after a Masonic lodge of Benevento.

== Biography ==
Raffaele De Caro fought as superior officer of the Bersaglieri Corps, in the war of Libya in 1912 and in World War I, while in World War II he was called up for civil defense.

He was elected deputy for the first time in 1919 and reconfirmed in subsequent elections until the dissolution of Parliament in 1925.

In 1943 De Caro served, first as Undersecretary and then as Minister of Public Works, in the Badoglio I Cabinet, both in Brindisi and Salerno.

In 1943 he founded the Liberal Democratic Party, widespread especially in some provinces of the Southern Italy, which merged into the Italian Liberal Party in August 1944.

In 1945 he was appointed a member of the National Council. On the occasion of the institutional referendum of 2 June 1946, he sided strongly with the Monarchy.

De Caro was president of the Italian Liberal Party from 1947 until his death. He served also as Minister for Parliamentary relations from 1954 to 1957 in the Scelba Cabinet and in the Segni I Cabinet; in this capacity he followed an investigationon the work of the police in the Wilma Montesi case.

He was always elected with wide suffrage to the Constituent Assembly and to the Chamber of Deputies until the general election of 1958, renouncing his appointment as Senator by right in 1953.

From the Liberation of Italy to his death, he was president of the Council of the Bar and Attorneys of Benevento.

He died in Turin, where he was for the celebrations of the centenary of Cavour's death, on the night of 3 June 1961.
