= Giovanni Cassandro =

Italian politician

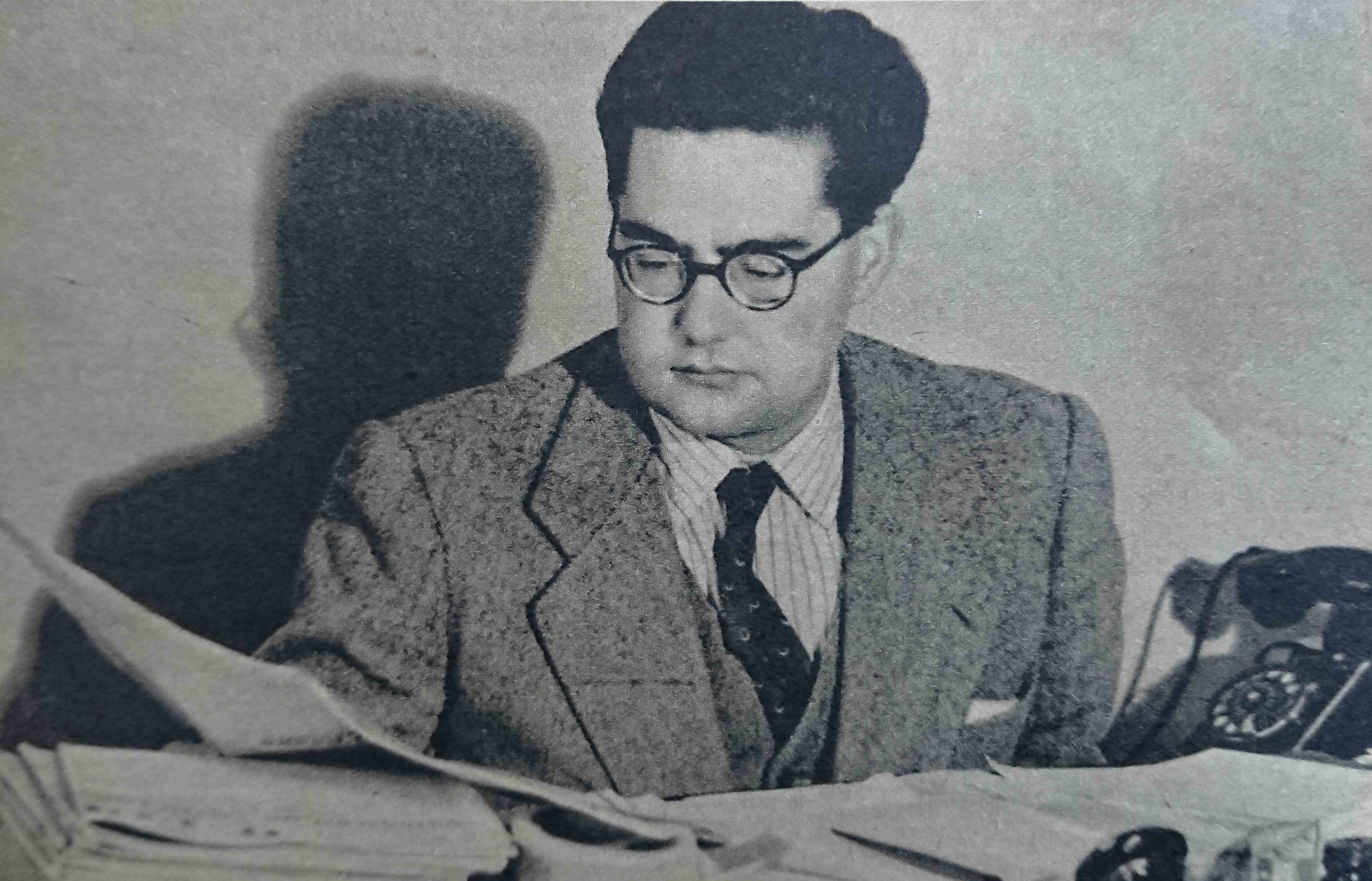
- Born: Giovanni Italo Cassandro; 21 April 1913; Barletta, Apulia Italy
- Died: 10 October 1989 (aged 76); Rome, Italy
- Education: Bari
- Occupations: Archivist; Legal historian Liberal activist Politician; University professor Judge
- Political party: PLI
- Spouse: Rachele Nicolini
- Children: Giorgia Cassandro
- Parent(s): Michele Cassandro (1876-1962); Francesca Catapano

Giovanni Cassandro (21 April 1913 - 10 October 1989) was an Italian Jurist by training, with a particular focus on Legal history. During the 1930s he worked as a government archivist, first in Venice and then in Naples, which gave him the opportunity to develop an abiding specialism in the wider history of Italy, especially with regard to the south. He also took a growing interest in politics, becoming a liberal activist during the closing years of the dictatorship and a member of the team around Benedetto Croce that re-established the Liberal Party after the arrest of Mussolini in July 1943. He served as party secretary in 1944 and again during 1946/47. Cassandro remained active in national politics till 1947, when he accepted a professorship in Legal history at the University of Bari. He later moved north, taking a series of professorships straddling the interface between Law and History at the Sapienza University of Rome. Between 1955 and 1967 he combined his university work with a position as one of the fifteen judge at the newly established Constitutional Court in Rome.

== Biography ==
Giovanni Italo Cassandro was born in Barletta, an ancient coastal town a short distance to the north-west of Bari. Michele Cassandro (1876-1962), his father, was a school languages teacher, schools inspector and the author of various published historical studies on local topics. He was still exceptionally young when he graduated from the University of Bari in 1933 with a degree in Jurisprudence.

Directly after graduating he competed in the national exam for a management position with the National Archives department, achieving the top position on the results list. In 1934 he accepted a posting by the department to Venice. This gave him the opportunity to get to know the historian-politician Roberto Cessi who had himself worked at the Venice Archives Department between 1908 and 1920, and was now based at the nearby University of Padua as professor of medieval and modern history. He was also able to become well acquainted with the medievalist historian Gino Luzzatto. Cassandro would always acknowledge a huge debt to both men whose history teaching and antifascist advocacy during Cassandro's two and a half years in Venice represented a far more appealing form of university-level further education than he would have received by staying in a university and working for a doctorate. There was at least one respect in which he was even more deeply indebted to the (originally) Neapolitan historian-philosopher and literary critic Fausto Nicolini whom also befriended him during this period. In or before 1936 Giovanni Cassandro married Rachele Nicolini, the daughter of this much respected mentor. In 1936 he moved to Naples, taking an equivalent management position with the Archives department there to the one he had been fulfilling in Venice. Naples was the home city of his newly acquired father-in law, Fausto Nicolini, and he continued to be hugely influenced by Nicolini both on a personal level and with regard to his on-going academic research. He had already published a number of historical studies even before 1933, but on his arrival in Naples, surrounded by the vast repository of material held at the archive, Cassandro embarked on a life-long study of the region identified, before 1860, as the Kingdom of the Two Sicilies.

It was also in Naples that he first came across Benedetto Croce, quickly joining the still relatively informal group of anti-fascist intellectuals surrounding the philosopher-politician. During 1943 he was a promoter of the re-emerging Liberal Party, becoming General Secretary of that part of the party representing the parts of Italy already liberated from Fascism directly after his thirty-first birthday in 1944. He was one of those who successfully called for the Party Congress for the liberated territories which was held in Naples during 2–4 June 1944, during the course of which he was confirmed in his office as Party Secretary. That same day the liberation of Rome disclosed a need for the Liberal Party that hitherto had been re-emerging in the south to reach out towards party colleagues who had remained in Rome through the fighting and also to those representative of the northern part of Italy (which at this stage effectively remained under German occupation). As an indication of solidarity within the party, the Torinese Manlio Brosio was therefore appointed as party General Secretary, while Cassandro took on the newly created post of vice-secretary of the party. By December 1944, when the post of party General Secretary switched from Manlio Brosio to Leone Cattani, there were three party vice-secretaries. The three of them, including Cassandro remained in post as deputies to Party Secretary Cattani. A new government was formed in December 1945 of which, after much wrangling, Leone Cattani became a member, which meant resigning the Party Secretarial position. He was not immediately replaced. Instead the administrative tasks were attended to by the three vice-secretaries already in position, Anton Dante Coda, Franco Libonati and Cassandro. That remained the position till the third party congress, held in Rome between 29 April and 2 May 1946, when Giovanni Cassandro was re-elected to his former position as Party General Secretary. Within the party hierarchy he tended to favour moderate centrist positions, frequently finding himself in alliance with his friend Benedetto Croce. As regards the public face of the party he was more than content to leave the limelight to others. However, during the second half of 1946 he played an important role behind the scenes in the integration of most of the key members of the Italian Democratic Party, hitherto seen as a right of centre monarchist party, into a broadened version of the Liberal Party. At the fourth party congress, held in December 1947, the direction of the party drifted away from the centre towards what would at the time have been seen as the political right. A prime mover in these changes was the unreconciled monarchist, Roberto Lucifero who himself now replaced Giovanni Cassandro as Party General Secretary. After this there is no indication that Cassandro exercised further significant influence over the decisions of the Liberal Party. Although he had been a member of the (nominated) National Council during 1945/46, there is no indication that he sought election to the "Constituent Assembly" when the country reverted to parliamentary democracy.

1947 marked a decisive move from politics into the mainstream universities sector for Giovanni Cassandro, who had been taking work as a free-lance teacher since 1938. He now entered and won a competition enabling him to take up a position as Professor for Italian Law at the University of Bari law faculty. In 1955 he was elected to membership of the new Constitutional Court, sworn in on 15 December 1955 as one of the court's fifteen judges. The mandate lasted for twelve years, (Note: In 1967 the term of office for judges of the Italian Constitutional Court was reduced from 12 years to 9 years.) and he served out his full term, retiring from the judiciary on 15 December 1967. He had retained close links with the University of Bari throughout his twelve year judicial mandate, but in 1967 he transferred to the Sapienza University of Rome, where he held a professorship in Legal history till 1983.

== Recognition ==
- 1956: Knight Grand Cross "di Gran Cordone" (Cavaliere di gran croce decorato di gran cordone)
