= Michele De Pietro =

Italian lawyer and politician (1884–1967)

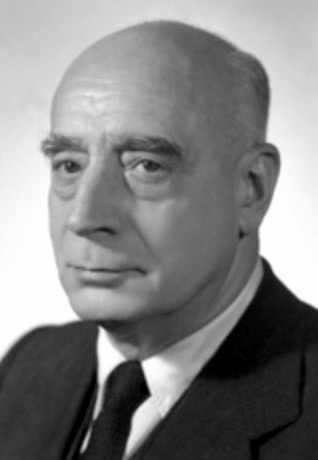

Minister of Justice
- In office 18 January 1954 – February 1954
- Prime Minister: Amintore Fanfani
- Succeeded by: Himself
- In office 10 February 1954 – 6 July 1955
- Prime Minister: Mario Scelba
- Preceded by: Himself

Personal details
- Born: 26 February 1884 Cursi, Lecce, Kingdom of Italy
- Died: 7 October 1967 (aged 83) Lecce, Italy
- Party: Italian Liberal Party (1920–1946); Christian Democracy
- Spouse: Clementina Fumarola
- Parents: Pasquale Domenico De Pietro; Addolorata Lunch
- Education: La Sapienza University

Michele De Pietro (1884–1967) was an Italian lawyer and politician. He was the vice president of the Italian Senate for two terms and the minister of justice in the period 1954–1956.

== Early life and education ==
De Pietro was born in Cursi, Lecce, on 26 February 1884. His parents were Pasquale Domenico De Pietro, a lawyer, and Addolorata Lunch.

He received a degree in law from La Sapienza University in Rome in 1906.

== Career and activities ==
Following his graduation De Pietro worked as a lawyer until 1915. He took part in World War I as an infantry captain. He joined the Italian Liberal Party (PLI) in 1920.

In 1942 De Pietro was arrested because of his anti-Fascist activities. In 1945 he was appointed member of the National Council. He left the PLI in 1946 and later joined the Christian Democrats (DC). In the elections on 18 April 1948 he was elected to the Italian Senate from the DC representing Lecce. In the 1953 elections he was again elected to the Senate and became vice president of the Senate which he held until 18 January 1954 when he was appointed minister of grace and justice to the first cabinet led by Prime Minister Amintore Fanfani. Although the cabinet's term ended soon, De Pietro continued to serve in the post in the subsequent cabinet led by Mario Scelba from 10 February 1954 to 6 July 1955.

On 4 July 1957 De Pietro was again elected vice president of the Senate. Following the end of his tenure in 1958 he became president of the order of lawyers and prosecutors at the Court of Appeal and the Court of Lecce. Between 1958 and 1967 he was also president of the National Center for Prevention and Social Defense, succeeding Alessandro Casati and Enrico De Nicola in this position.

== Personal life and death ==
De Pietro married Clementina Fumarola in 1911. He died in Lecce on 7 October 1967.
