= The Liberals (Italy) =

The Liberals I Liberali
- President: Edoardo Croci
- Founded: February 2014
- Split from: Italian Liberal Party
- Ideology: Liberalism
- Political position: Centre

The Liberals (I Liberali) is a liberal political party in Italy.

The party was launched in February 2014 by a qualified group of liberals, including some splinters of the Italian Liberal Party (PLI). Renato Altissimo, Alfredo Biondi, Edoardo Croci (who was appointed president), Enrico Musso, Alessandro Ortis, Carlo Scognamiglio and Giuliano Urbani were among the most notable founding members.

The Liberals, who presentend themselves to the public during a press conference in March, successfully sought to run in the 2014 European Parliament election within European Choice (SE), a joint list sponsored by the Alliance of Liberals and Democrats for Europe (ALDE) Party. The Liberals' Musso stood as candidate for the party within SE in the North-West Italy European Parliament constituency, but was not elected as the list received a mere 0.7% nationally.

In March 2021 Carlo Cottarelli, a former director of the International Monetary Fund, was chosen by The Liberals, Carlo Calenda's Action (A), Emma Bonino's More Europe (+E), the Italian Republican Party (PRI) and the Liberal Democratic Alliance for Italy (ALI) to head of a scientific committee designed to elaborate a joint political program.

== Leadership ==
- President: Edoardo Croci
  - Vice President: Maurizio Irti
