= De Pietro =

De Pietro is a surname. Notable people with the surname include:

- Cristina De Pietro (born 1957), Italian politician
- Javier De Pietro, Argentinian actor
- Michele De Pietro (1884–1967), Italian politician and lawyer
- Francesco De Pietro (1844–1934), Italian Catholic bishop

== DePietro ==
- Joseph DePietro (1914–1999), American bantamweight weightlifter
