= Bruno Villabruna =

Italian politician (1884–1971)

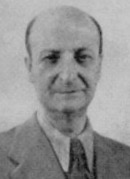

Podestà of Turin
- In office 1943–1943

Personal details
- Born: 12 August 1884 Santa Giustina, Kingdom of Italy
- Died: 16 October 1971 (aged 87) Torre Pellice, Italy
- Occupation: Lawyer

Bruno Villabruna (12 August 1884 – 16 October 1971) was an Italian lawyer and liberal politician.

Born in Santa Giustina, near Belluno in the Veneto, he was first elected to parliament in 1921. After the rise to power of the fascists, he joined, unlike many other liberals, the democratic opposition around the old leader Giovanni Giolitti and in 1924 refused to run as a candidate himself in the fascist-led national union list. When all political parties were dissolved in early 1925, he retired from political life and continued as a lawyer.

In July 1943, with the Mussolini regime having been overthrown, he was appointed podestà of Turin, but had to resign after 45 days because of the German occupation. In the liberated Northern Italy in 1945, he became a member of the Consulta Nazionale and in 1946 was elected to the Assemblea Costituente. He failed to be elected to the first parliament of the Italian Republic in 1948, but a few months later, he was appointed Secretary General of the Italian Liberal Party (PLI), which went through a deep crisis caused by his extreme right-wing predecessor Roberto Lucifero. Villabruna tried to convince the left-wing dissident group Movimento Liberale Indipendente (MLI) led by Count Nicolò Carandini to return to the ranks of PLI, which they had left in early 1948, but only in late 1951 did this operation come to a successful conclusion.

In 1954, Villabruna became Minister of Industry and Trade in the Scelba government, and handed over the leadership of the Liberal Party to Giovanni Malagodi, with whom he came into serious quarrels a few times later. In 1955, he left the PLI. Together with Carandini and Leone Cattani, he was now among the founders of the Radical Party. From 1958 to 1960, he was Secretary General of this party, retiring definitively to private life after its dissolution in 1962.

Villabruna died in 1971 in Torre Pellice, Turin.
