= Benedetto Nicotra =

Italian politician (born 1953)

Benedetto Nicotra (born 6 November 1953) is an Italian politician.

He joined Forza Italia in 1994, following the dissolution of Christian Democracy and served on the Chamber of Deputies from 2001 to 2006.
