= Giovanni Malagodi =

Italian politician (1904–1991)

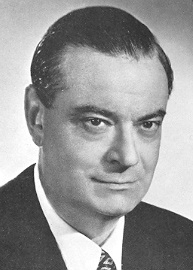

President of the Senate
- In office 22 April 1987 – 1 July 1987
- Preceded by: Amintore Fanfani
- Succeeded by: Giovanni Spadolini

Minister of the Treasury
- In office 26 February 1972 – 7 July 1973
- Prime Minister: Giulio Andreotti
- Preceded by: Emilio Colombo
- Succeeded by: Ugo La Malfa
Party political offices
President of the Italian Liberal Party
In office 1972–1976
Preceded by	Vittorio Badini Confalonieri
Succeeded by	Agostino Bignardi
Secretary of the Italian Liberal Party
In office 1954–1972
Preceded by	Bruno Villabruna
Succeeded by	Agostino Bignardi
Parliamentary offices
Member of the Senate of the Republic
In office 20 June 1979 – 17 April 1991
Constituency	Lombardy
Member of the Chamber of Deputies
In office 25 June 1953 – 19 June 1979
Constituency	Milan

Personal details
- Born: 12 October 1904 London, United Kingdom
- Died: 17 April 1991 (aged 86) Rome, Italy
- Party: Italian Liberal Party

Giovanni Francesco Malagodi (12 October 1904 – 17 April 1991) was an Italian liberal politician, secretary of the Italian Liberal Party (Partito Liberale Italiano; PLI), and president of the Italian Senate.

He was the third and sixth President of the Liberal International, in the periods 1958–1966 and 1982–1989 respectively.

== Biography ==
Born in London, he was the son of journalist and politician Olindo Malagodi. Starting from the 1930s, he held directive positions in the Banca Commerciale Italiana. He was thus named as Italian representative of the Organisation for European Economic Co-operation (OEEC) soon after the Second World War.

In 1953 Malagodi entered the Italian Liberal Party and was appointed the party's national secretary the following year. During his tenure, the PLI abandoned its historical identification with the Risorgimento and instead established strong ties with Confindustria, the country's leading association of industrialists. He also opposed attempts by the Christian Democrats to form a centre-left alliance with the Italian Socialist Party in government; this, in 1955, caused the secession of the PLI's left wing, which went on to form the Radical Party. Under Malagodi, in 1963 the PLI scored a record 7% in that year's general election.

With the formation of centre-left governments in the 1960s, the PLI was marginalized in the Italian political world, and suffered a decline that was not halted by the party's participation in the second Giulio Andreotti cabinet of 1972–1973. Malagodi was chosen as Minister of the Treasury in that government, launching a series of measures that favoured younger and more politically aligned bureaucrats, such as the so-called pensioni d'oro ("Golden pensions").

In 1972 Malagodi resigned as secretary of the PLI, assuming the party's presidency that same year. He abandoned this latter position in 1976 after coming into conflict with Valerio Zanone, the new leader of the PLI, who was more oriented towards a collaboration with centre-left parties. Malagodi was the president of the Italian Senate from 22 April to 1 July 1987, succeeding Amintore Fanfani.

Between 1954 and 1965, Malagodi participated in several Bilderberg conferences. He died in Rome in April 1991.

== Electoral history ==
Election	House	Constituency	Party	Votes	Result
1953	Chamber of Deputies	Milan–Pavia	PLI	10,392	Elected
1958	Chamber of Deputies	Milan–Pavia	PLI	35,430	Elected
1963	Chamber of Deputies	Milan–Pavia	PLI	80,924	Elected
1968	Chamber of Deputies	Milan–Pavia	PLI	87,376	Elected
1972	Chamber of Deputies	Milan–Pavia	PLI	41,298	Elected
1976	Chamber of Deputies	Milan–Pavia	PLI	7,226	Elected
1979	Senate of the Republic	Lombardy – Milan I	PLI	7,077	Elected
1983	Senate of the Republic	Lombardy – Milan I	PLI	6,465	Elected
1987	Senate of the Republic	Lombardy – Milan I	PLI	5,161	Elected

Party political offices
Preceded by Gaetano Martino	President of the Italian Liberal Party; 1972–1976	Succeeded by Agostino Bignardi
Transnational offices
Preceded by Roger Motz	President of the Liberal International; 1958–1966	Succeeded by Edzo Toxopeus
Preceded by Gaston Thorn	President of the Liberal International; 1982–1989	Succeeded by Adolfo Suárez
Political offices
Preceded by Emilio Colombo	Minister of Treasury; 1972–1973	Succeeded by Ugo La Malfa
Preceded by Amintore Fanfani	President of the Italian Senate; 1987	Succeeded by Giovanni Spadolini
