= Alfredo Biondi =

Italian politician and lawyer (1928–2020)

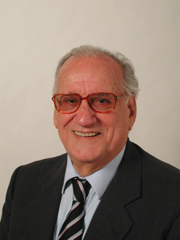

Minister of Justice
- In office 10 May 1994 – 17 January 1995
- Prime Minister: Silvio Berlusconi
- Preceded by: Giovanni Conso
- Succeeded by: Filippo Mancuso

Minister of the Environment
- In office 4 August 1983 – 30 July 1984
- Prime Minister: Bettino Craxi
- Preceded by: Established office
- Succeeded by: Valerio Zanone

Member of the Chamber of Deputies
- In office 5 June 1968 – 24 May 1972
- In office 20 June 1979 – 27 April 2006

Member of the Senate
- In office 27 April 2006 – 28 April 2008

Personal details
- Born: 29 June 1928 Pisa, Italy
- Died: 24 June 2020 (aged 91) Genoa, Italy
- Party: PLI (before 1994); FI (1994–2009); PdL (2009–2011); PLI (2011–2014); The Liberals (from 2014)
- Education: University of Pisa

Alfredo Biondi (29 June 1928 – 24 June 2020) was an Italian politician and lawyer. In 1994 he served as Minister of Justice of the Italian Republic during the first cabinet chaired by Silvio Berlusconi.

== Biography ==
Born in Pisa, Biondi was Secretary of the Italian Liberal Party (PLI) from 1985 to 1986, and later its president. He was a member of the Italian Chamber of Deputies from June 1968 to May 1972, and then from June 1983 to April 2006. He was a Senator from April 2006 to April 2008.

In 1993, together with the last PLI leader, Raffaele Costa, Biondi founded the Union of the Centre, a small faction of the new Forza Italia (FI) party. He served as Minister of Justice for a period of eight months (having previously served also as Ecology Minister in the 1980s). Biondi was appointed president of Forza Italia's National Council in 2004.

Following the dissolution of Forza Italia in 2009, Biondi remained in its successor organisation, the People of Freedom (PdL), for a further two years before leaving to join the refounded Italian Liberal Party. In 2014, Biondi was among a group of disaffected members who broke from that party to form The Liberals (I Liberali).

He died on 24 June 2020 in Genoa.

== Honour ==
- Italy: Knight Grand Cross of the Order of Merit of the Italian Republic (14 october 2011)
