= Union of the Centre (1993) =

Italian political party

Union of the Centre Unione di Centro
- President: Raffaele Costa
- Founded: 27 May 1993
- Dissolved: 30 November 1998
- Split from: Italian Liberal Party
- Merged into: Forza Italia
- Headquarters: Rome
- Ideology: Liberalism; Conservative liberalism Liberism
- Political position: Centre-right
- National affiliation: Pole of Freedoms/Pole of Good Government (1994–96); Pole for Freedoms (1996–98)
- European Parliament group: Forza Europa (1994–95)

The Union of the Centre (Italian: Unione di Centro, UdC) was a minor liberal political party in Italy. The party was a successor of the Italian Liberal Party.

== History ==
The party was founded on 27 May 1993 as a "Giscardian rassemblement" by Raffaele Costa, leader of the Italian Liberal Party (PLI). The UdC included Liberals (Alfredo Biondi, Stefano De Luca, Giacomo Paire, Valentino Martelli, etc.), members of the Italian Republican Party (Guglielmo Castagnetti, Vincenzo Garaffa, Gaetano Gorgoni, etc.), members of the Italian Democratic Socialist Party (as Maurizio Pagani) and even Christian Democrats (as Eugenio Tarabini).

In February 1994 the PLI was dissolved into the Federation of Liberals (FdL), which elected Raffaello Morelli secretary and Biondi president. Costa refused to join the new party and led the UdC into the coalitions formed around Forza Italia (FI), the Pole of Freedoms in the North and the Pole of Good Government in the South.

At the 1994 general election the UdC elected some candidates with FI: Biondi (who was still president of the FdL, which sided with the Segni Pact), Costa, Biondi, Enrico Nan and Enzo Savarese to the Chamber of Deputies, Luciano Garatti and Carlo Scognamiglio to the Senate. The latter was elected President of the Senate, while Biondi was justice minister and Costa health minister in Silvio Berlusconi's first government (1994–1995). In the 1994 European Parliament election two members of the UdC, de Luca and Luigi Florio, were elected to the European Parliament. In the 1996 general election the UdC had three deputies (Biondi, Costa, Nan and Savarese) and two senators (Scognamiglio and Jas Gawronski) elected.

In 1998 the UdC was merged into FI. The activity of the UdC continued through the Liberal Union of the Centre, a political association, and Popular Liberalism, a faction within FI. Both Biondi and Costa later left FI/PdL.
