= Giuseppe Basini =

Italian politician (1947–2025)

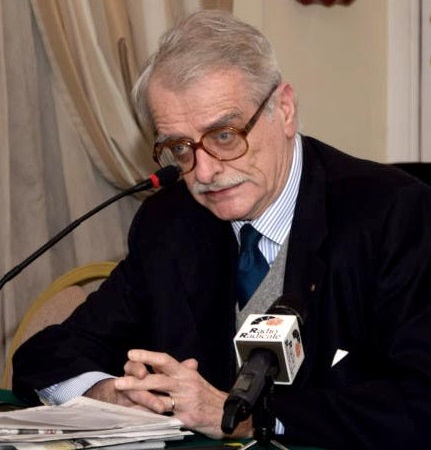
- Basini in 2018

Member of the Chamber of Deputies of Italy for Lazio 1
- In office 23 March 2018 – 13 October 2022

Member of the Senate of the Republic of Italy for Emilia-Romagna
- In office 9 May 1996 – 29 May 2001

Personal details
- Born: 10 February 1947; Reggio Emilia, Italy
- Died: 9 May 2025 (aged 78)
- Political party: AN (1995–2001); PLI (2001–2019); LN (2019–2025)
- Education: Sapienza University of Rome
- Occupation: Physician

Giuseppe Basini (10 February 1947 – 9 May 2025) was an Italian politician. A member of the National Alliance, the Italian Liberal Party, and the Lega Nord, he served in the Senate of the Republic from 1996 to 2001 and the Chamber of Deputies from 2018 to 2022.

Basini died on 9 May 2025, at the age of 78.
