= Edoardo Croci =

Italian environmentalist and politician

Edoardo Croci (born 15 November 1961, Milan) is an Italian environmentalist and politician.

== Ecopass ==
As Milan city Councillor for Mobility, Transport and the Environment, he introduced an innovative urban road pricing toll, related to fine dust emissions, to access the city centre since 2 January 2008. The system called Ecopass has been defined as a pollution charge in the category of Congestion pricing systems. Ecopass reduced PM10 emissions by 23% in the first 11 months of operation. It has been studied by researchers and policy makers worldwide as an example of transport economics. Ecopass reduced congestion (the congestion index fell by 4,7%) and improved road safety (a 10.5% drop in accidents in the toll zone).

== City referendum ==
After leaving the Municipality he assumed the role of President of the “committee for referendums on the environment and the quality of life in Milan” in 2010. The committee promoted referendums on mobility, energy, water, green, and the world EXPO 2015. All the referendums were approved with votes between 79% and 95%. The experience is considered an exemplar case of environmental democracy at the international level, as it was sponsored by deputy majors of five major European cities.
