= Stefano De Luca =

Italian politician (born 1942)

- De Luca in 1994

Member of the Chamber of Deputies
- In office 12 July 1983 – 14 April 1994
- Constituency: Palermo-Trapani-Agrigento-Caltanissetta (IX – X – XI)

Member of the European Parliament
- In office 19 July 1994 – 19 July 1999
- Constituency: Italian Islands

Personal details
- Born: 7 April 1942 (age 84) Paceco, Italy
- Party: PLI (until 1994); UdC (1994–1997); PLI (1997–present)
- Profession: Politician, lawyer

Stefano De Luca (born 7 April 1942) is an Italian politician and lawyer.

== Biography ==
De Luca was member of the Chamber of Deputies from 1983 to 1994 for the Italian Liberal Party. He also served as Undersecretary at the Ministry of Finance from 1987 to 1994 in the governments led by Goria, De Mita, Andreotti, Amato and Ciampi.

In 1994 he was elected MEP among the ranks of Forza Italia as member of the Union of the Centre.

In 1997 he re-founded the Liberal Party, of which he was the secretary until 2014 (when he was appointed president of the party), and joined the Group of the European Liberal Democrat and Reform Party.

In the 2018 general election he was a candidate for the Senate with the League in Campania, but he was not elected.
