= Luciano Magnalbò =

Italian politician (1943–2026)

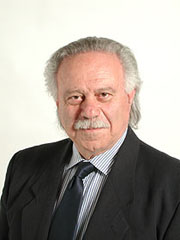
- Magnalbò in 2001

Member of the Senate of the Republic of Italy
- In office 21 April 1996 – 27 April 2006

Personal details
- Born: 5 April 1943 Macerata, Italy
- Died: 11 March 2026 (aged 82) Macerata, Italy
- Party: AN
- Education: University of Naples Federico II
- Occupation: Lawyer

Luciano Magnalbò (5 April 1943 – 11 March 2026) was an Italian politician. A member of the National Alliance, he served in the Senate of the Republic from 1996 to 2006.

Magnalbò died in Macerata on 11 March 2026, at the age of 82.
