= Italian Liberal Party =

Italian Liberal Party Partito Liberale Italiano
- Abbreviation: PLI
- Leaders: Giovanni Giolitti (first); Raffaele Costa (last)
- Founded: 8 October 1922
- Dissolved: 6 February 1994
- Preceded by: Liberals
- Succeeded by: Federation of Liberals (legal successor); Union of the Centre (split)
- Newspaper: L'Opinione
- Youth wing: Italian Liberal Youth
- Membership (1958): 173,722 (max)
- Ideology: Liberalism (Italian)
- Political position: Centre to centre-right
- National affiliation: National Bloc (1922–24); National List (1924–26); CLN (1943–47); UDN (1946–48); National Bloc (1948–49); Centrism (1947–58); Pentapartito (1980–91); Quadripartito (1991–94)
- European affiliation: ELDR Party
- European Parliament group: ELDR Group
- International affiliation: Liberal International
- Colours: Blue

The Italian Liberal Party (Italian: Partito Liberale Italiano, PLI) was a liberal political party in Italy.

The PLI, which was heir to the liberal currents of both the Historical Right and the Historical Left, was a minor party after World War II, but also a frequent junior party in government, especially after 1979. It originally represented the right wing of the Italian liberal movement, while the Italian Republican Party represented the left wing. The PLI disintegrated in 1994 following the fallout of the Tangentopoli corruption scandal and was succeeded by several minor parties. The party's most influential leaders were Giovanni Giolitti, Benedetto Croce and Giovanni Malagodi.

== History ==
=== Origins ===
The origins of liberalism in Italy lie with the Historical Right, a parliamentary group formed by Camillo Benso di Cavour in the Parliament of the Kingdom of Sardinia, following the 1848 revolution. The group was moderately conservative and supported centralised government, restricted suffrage, regressive taxation, and free trade. They dominated Italian politics following the country's unification in 1861, but never formed a party. The Liberals were indeed a loose coalition of local leaders, whose sources of strength were census suffrage and the first-past-the-post voting system.

The Right was opposed by its more progressive counterpart, the Historical Left, which overthrew Marco Minghetti's government during the so-called "parliamentary revolution" of 1876, leading to Agostino Depretis becoming Prime Minister. However, Depretis immediately began to look for support among Rightists MPs, who readily changed their positions, in a context of widespread corruption. This phenomenon, known in Italian as trasformismo (roughly translatable in English as "transformism" — in a satirical newspaper, the PM was depicted as a chameleon), effectively removed political differences in Parliament, which was dominated by an undistinguished liberal bloc with a landslide majority until World War I.

Two liberal parliamentary factions alternated in government, a conservative one led by Sidney Sonnino and a progressive one led by Giovanni Giolitti, who started as a member of the Historical Left and served as prime minister in 1892–1893, 1903–1905, 1906–1909, 1911–1914 and 1920–1921. Giolitti, whose faction was by far the largest, sought to unify the liberal establishment into a united party, the Liberals, in 1913, also with the participation of Sonnino. The Liberals governed in alliance with the Radicals, the Democrats and, eventually, the Reformist Socialists.

=== The brief party ===
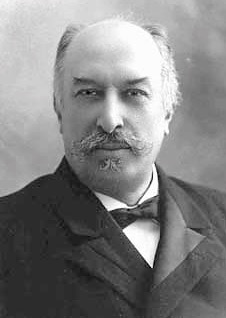
Giovanni Giolitti, five-time Prime Minister of Italy (1892–1921)

At the end of World War I, universal suffrage and proportional representation were introduced. These reforms caused major problems for the Liberals, who found themselves unable to stop the rise of two mass parties, the Italian Socialist Party (PSI) and the Italian People's Party (PPI), which had taken the control of many local authorities in northern Italy even before the war. Through the Christian-democratic PPI, Catholics, who had long been inactive due to the trauma of the capture of Rome and the struggles between the Holy See and the Italian state, started to be involved in politics, in opposition to both the PSI and the liberal establishment, which had governed the country for virtually sixty years.

The Parliament was thus fundamentally divided in three different blocs and fragmentation brought about instability, with the Socialists and the rising Fascist instigators of political violence on opposite sides. In this chaotic situation, in 1922 the Liberals re-grouped within the Italian Liberal Party (PLI), which immediately joined an alliance led by the National Fascist Party and formed with it a joint list for the 1924 general election, transforming the Fascists from a small political force into an absolute-majority party. The PLI, which failed to subdue the Fascists, was banned by Benito Mussolini in 1926, along with all the other parties, while many old Liberal politicians were given prestigious, but not influential, political posts, such as seats in the Senate, which was stripped of any real power by the Fascist reforms.

=== Post World War II ===
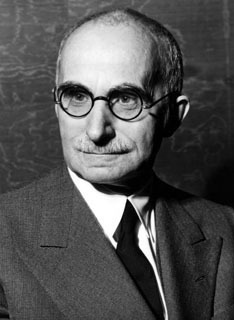
Luigi Einaudi, President of Italy from 1948 to 1955

The PLI was re-established in 1943 by Benedetto Croce, a prominent intellectual and senator, whose international recognition and parliamentary membership allowed him to remain a free man during the Fascist regime, despite being an anti-fascist himself, and joined the National Liberation Committee. After the end of World War II, Enrico De Nicola, a Liberal, became "provisional Head of State" and another one, Luigi Einaudi, who as Minister of Economy and Governor of the Bank of Italy between 1945 and 1948 had reshaped the Italian economy, succeeded him as President of Italy.

In the 1946 general election the PLI, as part of the National Democratic Union, won 6.8% of the vote, which was somewhat below expectations for a coalition representing the pre-Fascist political establishment. Indeed, the Union was supported by all the survivors of the Italian political class before the rise of Fascism, from Vittorio Emanuele Orlando to Radical Francesco Saverio Nitti. In its first years, the PLI was home to very different ideological factions and, for instance, it was successively led by Leone Cattani, a representative of the internal left, and then by Roberto Lucifero, a monarchist-conservative. In 1948 Bruno Villabruna, a moderate, was elected secretary and sought to re-unite all the Liberals under the party (also Cattani, who had left the party after Lucifero's election, returned into the fold).

=== Giovanni Malagodi ===
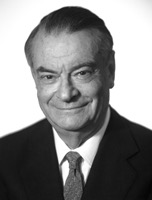
Giovanni Malagodi, leader from 1954 to 1972

In Giovanni Malagodi the PLI found a consequential leader. Under his 18 years at the head, Malagodi moved the party further to the right on economic issues. This caused in 1956 the exit of the party's left-wing, including Cattani, Villabruna, Eugenio Scalfari and Marco Pannella, who established the Radical Party. In particular, the PLI opposed the new centre-left coalition which also included the Italian Socialist Party, and presented itself as the main conservative party in Italy.

Malagodi managed to draw some votes from the Italian Social Movement, the Monarchist National Party and especially Christian Democracy, whose electoral base was mainly composed of conservatives suspicious of the Socialists, increasing the party's share to a historical record of 7.0% in the 1963 general election. After Malagodi's resignation from the party's leadership, the PLI was defeated with a humiliating 1.3% in the 1976 general election, but tried to re-gain strength by repositioning in the political centre and supporting social reforms supported by the Radicals, such as divorce.

=== The Pentapartito ===
After Valerio Zanone took over as party secretary in 1976, the PLI adopted a more centrist and, to some extent, social-liberal approach. The new secretary opened to the Socialists, hoping to put in action a sort of "lib–lab" cooperation, similar to the Lib–Lab pact experimented in the United Kingdom from 1977 to 1979 between the Labour Party and the Liberals. In 1983 the PLI finally joined the Pentapartito coalition composed also of the Christian Democracy (DC), the Italian Socialist Party (PSI), the Italian Democratic Socialist Party (PSDI) and the Italian Republican Party (PRI). In the 1980s the party was led by Renato Altissimo and Alfredo Biondi.

In 1992–1994 the Italian party system was shaken by the uncovering of the corruption system nicknamed Tangentopoli by the Mani pulite investigation. In the first months, the PLI seemed immune to investigation. However, as the investigations further unravelled, the party turned out to be part of the corruption scheme, along with its coalition partners. Francesco De Lorenzo, the Liberal Minister of Health, was one of the most loathed politicians in Italy for his corruption, that involved stealing funds from the sick and allowing commercialisation of medicines based on bribes.

=== Dissolution and diaspora ===
The party was disbanded on 6 February 1994 and at least four heirs tried to take its legacy:

- the Federation of Liberals (FdL), led by Raffaello Morelli and Valerio Zanone, the official successor party, first joined the Patto Segni, then The Olive Tree;
- the Union of the Centre (UdC), led by Alfredo Biondi, Raffaele Costa and Enrico Nan, was an associate party of Forza Italia (FI) and was merged into it in 1998 (other Liberals, including Antonio Martino, Giuliano Urbani, Giancarlo Galan and Paolo Romani, directly joined FI);
- the Liberal Left (SL) of Gianfranco Passalacqua, representing the party's left-wingers, was finally merged into the Democrats of the Left in 2006;
- the Italian Liberal Right (DLI), led by Gabriele Pagliuzzi and Giuseppe Basini, joined National Alliance (AN).

In a few years after 1994, most Liberals migrated to FI, while others joined the centre-left coalition, especially Democracy is Freedom – The Daisy (DL).

=== Re-foundation ===
The party was re-founded in 1997 by Stefano De Luca and re-took its original name in 2004. The new PLI gathered some of the former right-wing Liberals, but soon distanced itself from the centre-right coalition, led by FI, to follow an autonomous path and try to unite all the Liberals, from left to right, in a single party.

== Ideology, position, factions ==
The party's ideological tradition was liberalism, including different variants and factions. Indeed, as the party was at times the bulwark of secular conservatism and monarchism, it has been variously described as classical-liberal, conservative-liberal, liberista (meaning economically liberal and/or right-libertarian), liberal-conservative, and conservative. The party's political position has been usually described as centre-right and to the right of Christian Democracy, but sometimes also centrist. The party always included more progressive factions, chiefly including the one that broke away to form the Radical Party in 1956, and, under the leadership of Valerio Zanone, it arguably became a centre-left party: while under Giovanni Malagodi the PLI refused any cooperation with the Italian Socialist Party, under Zanone and the "lib-lab" pact the party became a close ally of the Socialists. Additionally it held laicist positions more similar to the other two centrist parties in the Pentapartito, Italian Republican Party and Italian Democratic Socialist Party.

== Popular support ==
Before World Wars the Liberals constituted the political establishment that governed Italy for decades. They had their main bases in Piedmont, where many leading liberal politicians of the Kingdom of Sardinia and the Kingdom of Italy came from, and southern Italy. The Liberals never gained large support after World War II as they were not able to become a mass party and were replaced by Christian Democracy (DC) as the dominant political force. In the 1946 general election, the first after the war, the PLI gained 6.8% as part of the National Democratic Union. At that time they were strong especially in the South, as DC was mainly rooted in the North: 21.0% in Campania, 22.8% in Basilicata, 10.4% in Apulia, 12.8% in Calabria and 13.6% in Sicily.

However, the party soon found its main constituency in the industrial elites of the "industrial triangle" formed by the metropolitan areas of Turin, Milan and Genoa. The PLI had its best results in the 1960s, when it was rewarded by conservative voters for its opposition to the participation of the Italian Socialist Party (PSI) in government. The party won 7.0% of the vote in 1963 (15.2% in Turin, 18.7% in Milan and 11.5% in Genoa) and 5.8% in 1968. The PLI suffered a decline in the 1970s and settled around 2–3% in the 1980s, when its strongholds were reduced to Piedmont, especially the provinces of Turin and Cuneo, and, to a minor extent, western Lombardy, Liguria and Sicily. By the end of the 1980s, similarly to the other parties of the Pentapartito coalition (Christian Democrats, Socialists, Republicans and Democratic Socialists), the Liberals strengthened their grip on the South, while in the North they lost some of their residual votes to Lega Nord. In the 1992 general election, the last before the Tangentopoli scandals, the PLI won 2.9% of the vote, largely thanks to the increase of votes from the South. After the end of the "First Republic" former Liberals were very influential within Forza Italia (FI) in Piedmont, Liguria and, strangely enough, in Veneto, where a former Liberal, Giancarlo Galan, was three times elected president.

The electoral results of the PLI in general (Chamber of Deputies) and European Parliament elections since 1913 are shown in the chart below.

== Electoral results ==
=== Italian Parliament ===
Election	Leader	Chamber of Deputies					Senate of the Kingdom				
Election	Leader	Votes	%	Seats	+/–	Position	Votes	%	Seats	+/–	Position
1924	Luigi Facta	233,521	3.3	15 / 535	▲15	▲6th	No election				
1929	None	Banned		0 / 400	▼15	–	No election				
1934	None	Banned		0 / 400	0	–	No election				
Election	Leader	Constituent Assembly					No upper house				
Election	Leader	Votes	%	Seats	+/–	Position	Votes	%	Seats	+/–	Position
1946	Giovanni Cassandro	1,560,638 (Note: Result of the National Democratic Union coalition with the Labour Democratic Party.)	6.8	31 / 535	▲31	▲4th	No election				
Election	Leader	Chamber of Deputies					Senate of the Republic				
Election	Leader	Votes	%	Seats	+/–	Position	Votes	%	Seats	+/–	Position
1948	Roberto Lucifero	1,003,727 (Note: Result of the National Bloc coalition with the Common Man's Front.)	3.8	14 / 574	▼17	4th	1,222,419	5.4	7 / 237	▲7	▲4th
1953	Bruno Villabruna	815,929	3.0	13 / 590	▼1	▼7th	695,816	2.9	3 / 237	▼5	▼7th
1958	Giovanni Malagodi	1,047,081	3.5	17 / 596	▲4	▲6th	1,012,610	3.9	4 / 246	▲1	▲6th
1963	Giovanni Malagodi	2,144,270	7.0	39 / 630	▲22	▲4th	2,043,323	7.4	18 / 315	▲14	▲4th
1968	Giovanni Malagodi	1,850,650	5.8	31 / 630	▼8	4th	1,943,795	6.8	16 / 315	▼2	4th
1972	Giovanni Malagodi	1,300,439	3.9	20 / 630	▼11	▼6th	1,319,175	4.4	8 / 315	▼8	▼6th
1976	Valerio Zanone	480,122	1.3	5 / 630	▼15	▼8th	438,265	1.4	2 / 315	▼6	▼8th
1979	Valerio Zanone	712,646	1.9	9 / 630	▲4	8th	691,718	2.2	2 / 315	0	8th
1983	Valerio Zanone	1,066,980	2.9	16 / 630	▲7	▲7th	834,771	2.7	6 / 315	▲4	▲7th
1987	Renato Altissimo	809,946	2.1	11 / 630	▼5	▼9th	700,330	2.2	3 / 315	▼3	▼9th
1992	Renato Altissimo	1,121,264	2.9	17 / 630	▲6	▲8th	939,159	2.8	4 / 315	▲1	▲8th

=== European Parliament ===
Election	Leader	Votes	%	Seats	+/–	Position	EP Group
1979	Valerio Zanone	1,271,159	3.6	3 / 81	▲3	▲7th	LDR
1984	Valerio Zanone	2,140,501 (Note: Jointly with the PRI.)	6.1	3 / 81	0	▲5th	LDR
1989	Renato Altissimo	1,532,388 (Note: Jointly with the PRI and Marco Pannella.)	4.4	4 / 81	▲1	5th	LDR

=== Regional elections ===
Regions of Italy
Election year	Votes	%	Seats	+/−	Leader
1970	1,290,715 (6th)	4.8	27 / 720	–	Giovanni Malagodi
1975	749,821 (7th)	2.5	11 / 720	▼16	Valerio Zanone
1980	816,418 (7th)	2.7	15 / 720	▲4	Valerio Zanone
1985	702,273 (7th)	2.2	13 / 720	▼2	Valerio Zanone
1990	630,242 (9th)	2.0	13 / 720	-	Renato Altissimo

== Leadership ==
- Secretary: Alberto Giovannini (1922–1924), Quintino Piras (1924–1926), Giovanni Cassandro (1944), Manlio Brosio (1944–1945), Leone Cattani (1945–1946), Giovanni Cassandro (1946–1947), Roberto Lucifero (1947–1948), Bruno Villabruna (1948–1954), Alessandro Leone di Tavagnasco (1954), Giovanni Malagodi (1954–1972), Agostino Bignardi (1972–1976), Valerio Zanone (1976–1985), Alfredo Biondi (1985–1986), Renato Altissimo (1986–1993), Raffaele Costa (1993–1994)
- President: Emilio Borzino (1922–1925), Benedetto Croce (1944–1947), Raffaele De Caro (1947–1961), Gaetano Martino (1961–1967), Vittorio Badini Confalonieri (1967–1972), Giovanni Malagodi (1972–1976), Agostino Bignardi (1976–1979), Aldo Bozzi (1979–1987), Salvatore Valitutti (1988–1991), Valerio Zanone (1991–1993), Alfredo Biondi (1993–1994)
- Party Leader in the Chamber of Deputies: Vittorio Emanuele Orlando (1946), Luigi Einaudi (1946), Francesco Saverio Nitti (1946–1947), Epicarmo Corbino (1947–1948), Raffaele De Caro (1948–1961), Giovanni Malagodi (1961–1971), Aldo Bozzi (1971–1987), Paolo Battistuzzi (1987–1993), Savino Melillo (1993–1994)

== Symbols ==
1922–1926

1944–1949

1949–1979

1979–1994
