= Nicholas Burgess Farrell =

British journalist (born 1958)

- Born: 2 October 1958 (age 67)
- Education: The King's School, Canterbury; Gonville and Caius College, Cambridge
- Employers: The Sunday Telegraph; The Spectator; La Voce di Romagna; Libero

Nicholas Burgess Farrell (born 2 October 1958) is a British journalist working as a columnist for The Spectator. After starting his career in England at The Sunday Telegraph and The Spectator, he moved to Italy, where he wrote among others for La Voce di Romagna, Libero, and Il Giornale. In Italy, Farrell is best known for his 2003 interview with Silvio Berlusconi, the then prime minister of Italy. According to Farrell, Berlusconi stated that the Italian fascist leader Benito Mussolini never killed anyone and that he was a benevolent dictator. Berlusconi later said that his words had been manipulated by Farrell, who stood by his reporting; the interview and other controversial statements by Berlusconi about the Italian judiciary came close to cause an institutional crisis.

During his career, Farrell's columns at Libero earned him both supporters and critics as they often aroused controversy. He also wrote several books. In 2003, Farrell wrote Mussolini: A New Life, an historical revisionist biography of Mussolini that attracted mixed-to-negative reviews; it was translated and re-published in multiple languages. In 2013, he wrote another book about Mussolini, this time in Italian, where he promoted the fringe theory that fascism and Nazism were left-wing rather than far-right. Farrell continued to work at The Spectator, where he interviewed future prime minister Giorgia Meloni in 2022 and began writing "Dolce vita" columns in 2024, reporting on local goings-on from Ravenna in his adopted home of Emilia-Romagna, having lived in the Italian region since 1998.

== Early life and career ==
Farrell was born in London on 2 October 1958. He attended The King's School, Canterbury, and studied history at Gonville and Caius College, Cambridge, earning his B.A. on 20 June 1980. He completed his apprenticeship and earned the National Certificate in Newspaper Journalism following his National Certificate Examination exam in October 1984. Farrell worked as journalist for the Telegraph Publishing Limited at The Sunday Telegraph from 1987 to 1996, later moving to The Spectator from April 1996 to July 1998.

In 2003, Farrell attracted international attention for his interview with Berlusconi. At that time, Berlusconi was in his second term as prime minister of Italy, which started in June 2001 and ended in May 2006 (of his three terms, this one was the longest), and was also the head of the rotating Presidency of the Council of the European Union, not releasing any interviews. The interview was published in The Spectator with the title "Forza Berlusconi!"

== Interview with Silvio Berlusconi ==
In August 2003, Farrell had a three-hour interview with Berlusconi in his Sardinian palace in Porto Rotondo, alongside Boris Johnson, the future mayor of London and prime minister of the United Kingdom who at that time was editor of The Spectator and a MP from the Conservative Party. In the interview, Berlusconi made statements that were widely summarised or reported as "Mussolini wasn't that bad" in line with the well-known Italian myth that he also did good things (Italian: Mussolini ha fatto anche cose buone), including the claim that Saddam Hussein was worse than Mussolini as Berlusconi was discussing Iraq and that Italian judges were "mentally disturbed", and sparked criticism and controversy in Italy when excerpts were published.

More specifically, in the second part of the interview that was published in September 2003 by The Spectator and La Voce di Rimini, where Farrell worked as a editor, after being asked by Farrell if Mussolini was a benevolent dictator, Berlusconi was quoted as saying: "Yes ... Mussolini never killed anyone. Mussolini sent people on holiday to confine them [banishment to small islands such as Ponza and Maddalena which are now plush resorts]." This view, which was defended by some of Berlusconi's supporters and Berlusconi himself within the context of a comparison to another dictator, is not supported by scholarly consensus, with one scholarly estimate being around one million deaths as a result of Mussolini's rule in Italy, Ethiopia, Lybia, and Yugoslavia. (Note: In Italy, the interview sparked numerous reactions not only from politicians and opinionists but also historians, such as Franco Cardini, Emilio Gentile, Pietro Melograni, and Nicola Tranfaglia. International historians and Jewish figures strongly contested Berlusconi's claim, which came after earlier in the year (2 July 2003) he had told Martin Schulz, who criticised his domestic policy, he would recommend him "for the role of a Kapo", which was also discussed in his interview with Farrell and Johnson. (Farrell & Johnson 2003) The one million deaths estimate was made by Mussolini biographer R. J. B. Bosworth, who cited the "atrocious massacres in Libya, Ethiopia, the former Yugoslavia" and after 1943 "of Italian Jews can all be traced back to him". Similarly, Mack Smith, an eminent historian and scholar of Italian history who reviewed Farrell's 2003 revisionist biography of Mussolini, stated: "Although Mussolini is not responsible for as many crimes as Hitler or Stalin, he was certainly a brutal dictator." Regret and sadness were expressed by Amos Luzzatto, the then president of the Union of Italian Jewish Communities, who said: "Fascism may not have built extermination camps for the Jews, but it certainly helped create them ... If killing someone means striking them directly and killing them, then not even Hitler ever killed anyone. But reasoning this way, we could conclude that there were no deaths in the Second World War.") Berlusconi was criticised for having apparently forgotten the murder of Giacomo Matteotti and Blackshirts and Squadrismo violence, and the opposition accused him of apology for fascism, which is a crime in Italy. On 18 September, Il Foglio criticised Berlusconi as "weak" for not having openly apologised to the Jewish community.

The controversial statements came after Farrell and Johnson asked Berlusconi whether the then United States president George W. Bush and British prime minister Tony Blair had told him that Iraq had weapons capable of hitting the West in 45 minutes. Berlusconi said that he did not talk directly to them about this and that there was a major problem of the West's relations with the Muslim and Middle Eastern world, citing the lack of democracy and that they had known no other system than dictatorship, at which point Farrell interjected by saying: "Like Italy?" Berlusconi told Farrell, "Let's leave it at that, it was a dictatorship much more...", at which point Farrell interjected, "Benevolent", while the prime minister's interpreter said, "Or benign". At this point, Berlusconi made the controversial statements about Mussolini, after which he said: "Aside from that, the discussion here becomes broader: we are facing a new world scenario. The West's opposition to the Warsaw Pact is over. Now the Russian Federation has decided, through Putin, to join the West; this is a great thing..."

In the same interview, for which Farrell is best known in Italy, Berlusconi publicly swore the innocence of Marcello Dell'Utri, who at that time was charged for colluding with the Sicilian Mafia, describing him as a "Catholic, a believer, and a man of culture, with an outstanding family and a well-off father". He said that Dell'Utri was a victim of the "crazy communist judiciary", (Note: In the interview with Farrell and Johnson, Berlusconi attacked the Italian judges and magistrates and claimed a vast communist conspiracy against him, and made deep state allegations that communists had infiltrated the state; he also dismissed his conflict of interest by stating that he had to sell his stores because communists boycotted him. In response to a question about Giulio Andreotti, a powerful and long-serving former Italian prime minister who was charged for colluding with the Mafia, Berlusconi said: "To do that job [of magistrate], you have to be mentally disturbed. You have to have psychological problems. If they do that job, it's because they are anthropologically different from the rest of the human race." This statements, which triggered reactions that bordered on an institutional crisis with the Quirinale, were defended by centre-right coalition figures like Sandro Bondi (deputi from Forza Italia, Berlusconi's party), Paolo Bonaiuti (deputy from Forza Italia), and Ignazio La Russa (deputy from AN), even as Berlusconi later corrected his position, declaring he did not want to question "respect for the judiciary's commitment". In addition to the centre-left coalition opposition, Berlusconi was criticised by the Secolo d'Italia, the newspaper of AN, which called it a gaffe and published a cartoon depicting Berlusconi about to enter a mental asylum. In the same interview with Farrell and Johnson, Berlusconi attacked The Economist because in his view it confused "cops with thieves" and distorted the reality of the conflict of interest, stating that "I had to sell my entire chain of large stores because the Communists didn't want to buy from me and had a 'BB' strategy, boycott Berlusconi." He also attacked the centre-left opposition, alleged that the Communists "were not brought to court because the Left had its men infiltrated into all the key points of government", and criticised giants of Italian journalism (as they were known) like Enzo Biagi and Indro Montanelli, claiming they were "jealous" and "driven by an irrational feeling".) and that his only fault was of trusting people he did not know were notorious mafiosi, questioning the legitimacy of the crime of aiding and abetting (or complicity from the outside) a mafia-type association (Italian: concorso esterno in associazione mafiosa). When the first excerpts from the two-part interview were published in Italy on the newspaper La Voce, Berlusconi stated that his words had been manipulated by Farrell, whom he described as a "criminal", that the interview had been a bunch of small talk with some friends, and that he was "a little tipsy" from drinking two bottles of champagne. Farrell denied the accusations and gave a summary of the conditions of the interview, stating that Berlusconi himself asked when and where the article was expected to be published, that the interview set-up took several weeks, and that the talk was recorded on tape. He denied any drinking of alcohol at the interview since only lemon tea was served at their table. Farrell ended his rebuttal by telling Berlusconi to "be good" as the publication of a third-part interview was ready. Although the interview almost caused an institutional crisis, public opinion eventually moved away from the controversy to Berlusconi's pension reform.

== Columnist and editor ==
In 2007, Farrell joined the Italian Order of Journalists, at first working for the local newspaper La Voce di Romagna. He later worked for the national daily newspaper Libero. As a columnist of Libero, which often attracted controversy for its headlines, Farrell wrote a number of provocatory articles, (Note: Some of his columns on Libero had a "Provocation" tag. (Libero, 4 January 2009)) including that he wished his son not to be gay but that being gay was better than being a communist, (Note: In November 2010, Farrell wrote that he would prefer one of his sons not to be gay, stating that while he did not share his wife's view that homosexuality is a sin, he thought that one becomes gay and is not born gay, and that it was far better to be gay than a communist, including supporting Italy of Values. Farrell was apologetic toward Berlusconi's statements that it was "better be fond of nice girls than homosexuals" and stated that anyone would prefer a straight son to a gay son. He wrote that one night he was tricked himself when in his blue period, referencing Pablo Picasso, he went home with a transvestite he was convinced was a woman until he got into bed; he said that since he thought the transvestite to be a woman, he was not gay. Citing an episode where his son said "I want to be a woman", Farrell referenced a character in Federico Fellini's film Amarcord, and urged his son to shout "I want a woman!" According to Farrell, the purpose of his article was to show that critics of Berlusconi were for personal freedom but then became moralists when it came to Berlusconi controversies in his personal life, citing journalist Michele Santoro as an example. (Libero, 9 November 2010)) that there was a link between the hatred of Jews and that of smokers, that he wanted to personally torture rapists with a chainsaw, asserted his right as a parent to kick and slap his children, drove around drunk, (Note: In January 2011, Farrell wrote that he could drive drunk because he was mature. (Libero, 4 January 2009) Farrell had his driving licence suspended twice (on 18 April 2009 and 2 February 2011) for driving his "anti-communist black" Land Rover Defender under the influence of alcohol. According to Farrell's article about the issue, police agents halted him only after allegedly identifying his car due to an obsession against him. The car, formally owned by his wife, escaped confiscation. While his English driving licence was not revoked, his permit to drive in Italy was, which meant that Farrell's alcohol rate was at least higher than 1,5 g/l, passing the limit for seizure. As a result, Farrell wrote that he was thinking of leaving Italy for Istria. (Libero, 3 February 2011)) argued that Gianfranco Fini was a Nazi and thus a leftist, criticised the perceived moralism regarding Berlusconi controversies in his private life and downplayed the seriousness of Berlusconi's sexual behaviour, (Note: In January 2011, Farrell wrote a provocatory article about a "confession" to "Nun Boccassini" (referencing the magistrate Ilda Boccassini) about having sex with multiple women, sometimes minors and sometimes after payment, referencing sex tourism in Thailand in order to downplay the seriousness of Berlusconi's behaviour. (Libero, 17 January 2011) In February 2011, Farrell criticised the public demonstrations held in many Italian cities asking Berlusconi to resign after the emerging sex scandals involving sex with minors and prostitutes. According to Farrell, the left-wing critics of bunga bunga and the Berlusconi sex scandal agreed with "easy abortions, assisted suicides, transvestites, fags, whores, partner-swappers, and Muslims with four wives", and thus he found their perceived moralism regarding Berlusconi's sexual behaviour as hypocritical. (Libero, 15 February 2011)) and stated the well-known Italian myth often repeated by Berlusconi that "communists eat children" (Italian: i comunisti mangiano i bambini) was true, (Note: In February 2011, Farrell cited Timothy D. Snyder's book Bloodlands: Europe Between Hitler and Stalin as saying that children were killed and eaten to feed starving families in the Soviet Union, and that this supported his generalised claim that "communists eat children". It attracted criticism because instead of discussing the new insights brought by the book to interwar history, Farrell focused on only three pages of the book about cannibalism and used those to accuse the Italian left of being supportive of the practice. (Libero, 11 February 2011)) all of which led to controversy or criticism. After the 7 July 2005 London bombings, Farrell wrote an article on La Voce di Romagna about Simona Pari and Simona Torretta, two UNICEF volunteers kidnapped in 2004 by Shia militants in Iraq. Following the Italian government's negotiation of their release, they urged their government to withdraw its troops from Iraq and criticised the U.S. occupation of Iraq. As a result, Farrell called them traitors and described them as "viscid sewer bugs" who were "accomplices to terrorists". Farrell was sued for the defamatory comments by Pari and was later sentenced to four months' jail time (a suspended sentence) and fined €25,000 in punitive damages.

Other provocatory or controversial claims made by Farrell in his columns, including at Il Giornale, were that Mussolini had popular support, that he was not like Adolf Hitler and the Italian fascists saved many Jews, (Note: Mussolini, who held power in Italy from 1922 to 1943 and until 1945 led the Italian Social Republic in northern Italy as a puppet state of Nazi Germany, introduced the Italian racial laws against Jews in 1938; according to a 2003 scholarly estimate, approximately 7,000 Jews were deported from Italy to Germany by German occupation troops, and 5,910 of them were killed.) that fascism was left-wing, and that the Italian Resistance was a military minority in the conflict and that its communist components, which fought for the liberation of Italy and were part of the Constituent Assembly that wrote the democratic Italian Constitution, were fighting for the Soviet Union and dictatorship. (Note: In February 2013, Farrell wrote: "Isn't it time—after 70 years—to face a simple truth? Here it is: the Resistance in Italy was completely irrelevant from a military standpoint. In any case, in the summer of 1944, there was no Resistance in Italy. Later, however—from the fall of 1944 onward—what concrete achievements did this Resistance bring? Worse. According to historiography, the Resistance fought for the homeland, freedom, and democracy. That's not true. Its communist elements (the dominant ones) fought for the Soviet Union, dictatorship, and communism." (Il Giornale, 1 February 2013) In April 2014, he wrote: "Unlike Hitler and the Nazis, Mussolini and the Fascists were not at all anti-Semitic at the beginning of their adventure. However, they became so in the second half of the 1930s, after the fateful alliance with Hitler—morally repulsive, yes, but lukewarm compared to the Nazis. The 1938 racial laws in Italy were an abomination, but no Jew was deported from Italy to the Nazi extermination camps before Mussolini's fall in 1943." (Il Giornale, 22 April 2014) Farrell further wrote: "First of all, it must be said that fascism and communism had much more in common with each other than either of them had in common with either capitalism or democracy ... Understanding fascism without fear means accepting many very uncomfortable things, and among them a fundamental one: fascism was not imposed, but desired by the Italian people; and true resistance to fascism in Italy did not occur until 1944; and in the liberation of Italy, the resistance was 'minority' from a military standpoint ... Mussolini had realised—because of the war—that people are more loyal to their country than to their social class ... To fully understand fascism, we must therefore recognise a denied truth: fascism, beneath the black shirt, was left-wing." (Il Giornale, 22 April 2014)) In his August 2010 column for Libero about the Holocaust and anti-smoking activism, which he linked by saying that both Mussolini and Hitler hated smoking, Farrell wrote: "The German National Socialists hated Jews because they were bankers and small businessmen, symbols of the hated capitalism. It's no coincidence that the anti-Semites masquerading as anti-Zionists are left-wing, and even today they hate Israel and flirt with Islamic fascists who subjugate men and women in the name of the state." He argued that heavy smokers and drinkers like him were prosecuted by "health fascists" just like the Jews were prosecuted in the Holocaust.

Also in August 2010, Farrell called Fini, at that time president of the Chamber of Deputies, a "National Socialist". It was observed that Farrell did not merely mean to use the fascist label as an insult but tried to justify it on the merits. This came after another Libero column written a few days earlier by Giampaolo Pansa had called Fini a "fascist-communist". Although Fini had been a member of the Italian Social Movement (a neo-fascist party founded by Mussolini's followers), he renounced fascism as leader of the post-fascist National Alliance (AN) in the 1990s and went to Jerusalem to apologise for the Holocaust. According to Farrell, "Fini has only done two right-wing (in the Anglo-Saxon sense) things recently: (1) he went to Jerusalem to apologise for the Shoah; (2) he smokes", which could be interpreted to mean that the Holocaust and anti-smoking activism were left-wing. It was also observed that the January 2003 legislation related to the smoking ban in all indoor public places was introduced by Girolamo Sirchia, a Berlusconi minister (at that time Minister of Health), during the second Berlusconi government and not by Fini or the left. Despite the criticism and controversy related to some of his columns, Farrell earned a following of supporters; rather than indignate, the reading of some of his columns was considered to be fun.

In November 2014, Farrell wrote a letter to Antonio Socci, who had stated that the 2013 conclave election of Pope Francis was invalid and criticised his homilies and pontificate for being too "communist". In response, Farrell stated as an anti-communist supporter of the pope, whose charisma reminded him of Pope John Paul II, that Socci should stop make such attacks on Francis. While in Italy, Farrell continued to work as a columnist for The Spectator. During the 2022 Italian general election campaign, Farrell had an interview on The Spectator with Meloni, the Brothers of Italy leader and eventual prime minister after the 2022 general election, as she attempted to provide a more moderate and mainstream conservative image amid neo-fascist concerns as her party is an heir of the Italian Social Movement from which the party took the tricolour flame, which Meloni defended while denying of being a fascist. The interview was published on The Spectator by Farrell under the title "Prima donna" where he asked whether Meloni truly was "the most dangerous woman in Europe".

== Political views ==
During his career, Farrell showed support for conservatism, or Anglo-Saxon liberalism, as well as anti-communism with a right-wing libertarian streak about the state. (Note: In April 2014, Farrell wrote: "Personally, I'm not a fascist, I'm English. A Thatcherite English anarchist. But who I am doesn't change what people say and write about me. For what I write about Mussolini and fascism, they call me a fascist..." (Il Giornale, 22 April 2014)) For instance, he criticised the "nanny state", saying that those who argue that the state should ban smoking, drinking, and junk food were called "health fascists" in the United Kingdom and United States. Farrell held Eurosceptic views, writing columns critical of the European Union and the proposed United States of Europe. (Note: A few weeks after the 2014 European Parliament election, Farrell wrote: "It's said: only thanks to the EU have there been 70 years of peace in Europe. That's not true. There has been peace in Europe only thanks to the Anglo-Americans and the Marshall Plan. Today, the EU and its single currency represent the greatest threat to peace in Europe." (Il Giornale, 6 June 2014) In another article in June 2014, he wrote: "My homeland is in my blood—like everyone else—and that's why the European Union can never become a United States of Europe." (Il Giornale, 14 June 2014)) He also generally supported Berlusconi, although he at times criticised him, for example when Berlusconi accused him of manipulating their 2003 interview; despite this, Farrell defended Berlusconi, stating he reminded him of Jay Gatsby in The Great Gatsby.

Farrell called Berlusconi a "genius", thought of him as "the only one who can govern this country", and once dubbed his critics and opposing journalists "those shitty Italians". In his praise of Berlusconi, seen as an entrepreneur who supported the free market, Farrell often referred to him as il Magnifico. When Fini criticised Berlusconi, for example calling him illiberal, and left the People of Freedom to establish the Future and Freedom party in 2010, Farrell celebrated the separation as he argued that Fini was preventing the People of Freedom from transforming into a "modern, Anglo-Saxon, truly liberal" right-wing party, and that "the Italian right has the opportunity to free itself from the fascist right, that is, from the leftist right". According to Farrell, Fini was a statist and supporter of the welfare state who was "illiberal because he is post-fascist, that is, left-wing".

== Works ==
Farrell's 2003 book Mussolini: A New Life, which was published by Weidenfeld & Nicolson, described Mussolini as an unfairly maligned leader whose "charisma" and Machiavellian adroitness were "phenomenal"; it was acclaimed by British novelist and academic Tim Parks as a "welcome" revisionist biography. It was criticised by Tobias Jones of The Guardian, who summarized it by saying that its "basic thesis is that Mussolini deserves his place in the pantheon of great men and that fascism wasn't so bad after all". Jones observed that Farrell's book was "a bit of a cut-and-paste job" of Renzo De Felice's biography of Mussolini; De Felice himself was often criticised as a revisionist historian whose biography of Mussolini was said to be near hagiographic.

In his review of the book, Mark Simpson wrote in The Independent that Mussolini, after Ida Dalser (Mussolini's first wife), Rachele Mussolini (Mussolini's second wife), Clara Petacci (Mussolini's mistress), and Adolf Hitler (one of his first admirers), had found another "wife" in Farrell, who he said had "possessively proposed a new Mussolini" as a "prisoner of love", whose defects were transformed into virtues. In The Daily Telegraph, popular historian Andrew Roberts criticised Farrell's statement that "Mussolini saved more Jews than Oskar Schindler" and that Mussolini was not antisemitic but anti-Jewish. Despite the criticism, the book was popular enough to be translated into six languages.

In 2010, Farrell had a diatribe with Marco Travaglio and Malcom Pagani about the alleged Mussolini diaries, which appeared to support his more sympathetic thesis in his 2003 book about Mussolini but were proven to be forgeries. Farrell had stated that noted British historian Denis Mack Smith told him that the diaries were true; however, there was no evidence that this was true other than Farrell's claim. Mack Smith himself had a negative opinion on Farrell's book, which depicted Mussolini as neither corrupt nor a tyrant, that he was not a reactionary and that he won power by consent rather than violence, and that he was not responsible for the assassination of Matteotti and other victims of fascism. In a 2013 interview to promote his book Il compagno Mussolini. La metamorfosi di un giovane rivoluzionario (Comrade Mussolini: The Metamorphosis of a Young Revolutionary), co-written with Giancarlo Mazzuca, Farrell reiterated his fringe view about fascism being left-wing. In 2020, his biography of Mussolini, titled Mussolini. Il primo populista (Mussolini: The First Populist), was published by Rusconi.

== Personal life ==
In the summer of 1998, Farrell moved to Italy in Emilia-Romagna, more specifically in Predappio, a town he calls "the fascist Bethlehem", where Mussolini was born and buried, with a significant far-right following. (Note: In April 2014, Farrell described Predappio as "a paradise for me: Tuscany, but without the English". He added: "I drove from London to Predappio (after a year-long stay in Paris) in the summer of 1998 to write a biography of Mussolini. I wanted to understand once and for all: what does this word 'fascism' really mean, a word so widespread yet so opaque? Even the great George Orwell asked in an essay from the 1940s: 'What is fascism?' Orwell, a leftist who hated communism because he was 'nationalist,' had noted something the communist left denied: fascism appealed to the people." (Il Giornale, 22 April 2014)) An avid smoker and drinker, particularly of Sangiovese, Farrell often discussed this in his columns, including being stopped for driving under the influence. Farrell married an Italian woman with whom he has six children, aged 10 to 22 as of November 2025. During his career, Farrell wrote a number of articles referencing his personal life and family. In October 2025, Farrell wrote an article for The Spectator discussing his family's disagreement about the Gaza war and the related Gaza genocide. He wrote that his family supported the view that Israel was guilty of genocide and that the Meloni government and the prime minister were complicit in the genocide, while he supported Israel and held the view that "a country called Palestine does not exist", and three of his children took part at a pro-Palestinian demonstration in Forlì. His 18-year old daughter wrote him a response that was published in The Spectator.

== Selected works ==
=== Articles ===
- Farrell, Nicholas (25 June 2003). "A chip off the old block?". The Independent. Archived from the original on 6 July 2022.
- Farrell, Nicholas (4 January 2009). "Guido sbronzo ma posso perché io sono maturo". Libero (in Italian).
- Farrell, Nicholas (9 November 2010). "Consiglio a mio figlio Winston: meglio essere gay piuttosto che comunista". Libero (in Italian).
- Farrell, Nicholas (9 November 2010). "Il PDL può trasformarsi in un partito anglosassone". Libero (in Italian).
- Farrell, Nicholas (11 December 2010). "Niente shampoo da 3 mesi. Così ho trovato la felicità". Libero (in Italian).
- Farrell, Nicholas (12 December 2010). "Fai Natale a Sharm? Ti meriti di restare bloccato". Libero (in Italian).
- Farrell, Nicholas (17 January 2011). "Suor Boccassini mi confessi: ho molto peccato". Libero (in Italian).
- Farrell, Nicholas (3 February 2011). "L'agente Mussolini mi perseguita. Fuggo dall'Italia, meglio l'Istria". Libero (in Italian).
- Farrell, Nicholas (11 February 2011). "È provato: i comunisti mangiano i bambini". Libero (in Italian). p. 32.
- Farrell, Nicholas (15 February 2011). "La vera vittima del bunga bunga? È il Cavaliere". Libero (in Italian).
- Farrell, Nicholas (27 June 2012). "My Italian wife is determined to convert me". The Telegraph. Archived from the original on 23 August 2016.
- Furrell, Nicholas (1 February 2013). "E ora la sinistra celebra il lato buono di Mussolini". Il Giornale (in Italian). Archived from the original on 22 February 2024.
- Farrell, Nicholas (22 April 2014). "Il fascismo? Può sdoganarlo solo un politico di sinistra". Il Giornale (in Italian). Archived from the original on 5 August 2025.
- Farrell, Nicholas (6 June 2014). "Non fu la resistenza a liberare l'Italia ma solo gli alleati". Il Giornale (in Italian). Archived from the original on 5 August 2025.
- Farrell, Nicholas (14 June 2014). "Tifo contro, circondato da nemici. L'Europa è questa". Il Giornale (in Italian). Archived from the original on 20 January 2018.
- Farrell, Nicholas (10 August 2014). "The truth about La Dolce Vita". The Telegraph. Archived from the original on 22 June 2024.
- Farrell, Nicholas (24 January 2020). "Salvini's plan to smash Italy's red wall". UnHerd. Archived from the original on 25 January 2020.
- Farrell, Nicholas (30 September 2021). "Is Silvio Berlusconi mad?". UnHerd. Archived from the original on 1 October 2021.
- Farrell, Nicholas (20 August 2022). "Is Giorgia Meloni the most dangerous woman in Europe?". The Spectator. Archived from the original on 21 August 2022.
- Farrell, Nicholas (22 May 2023). "Who is really to blame for Italy's devastating floods?". The Spectator. Archived from the original on 12 August 2025.
- Farrell, Nicholas; Johnson, Boris (12 June 2023). "Forza Berlusconi! Silvio in Sardinia". The Spectator. Archived from the original on 12 June 2023.
- Farrell, Nicholas (3 October 2024). "Le avventure in Interrail". Internazionale (in Italian). No. 1583. Archived from the original on 19 April 2025.
- Farrell, Nicholas (4 October 2025). "My Italian family believe Meloni is complicit in genocide". The Spectator. Archived from the original on 7 October 2025.

=== Books ===
- Farrell, Nicholas (2003). Mussolini: A New Life. Weidenfeld & Nicolson. ISBN 978-0-297-81965-3. Archived from the original on 15 October 2025 – via Google Books.
- Farrell, Nicholas (2006). Mussolini (in Italian). Le Lettere. ISBN 978-88-7166-908-3. Archived from the original on 19 October 2025 – via Google Books.
- Farrell, Nicholas; Mazzuca, Giancarlo (2013). Il compagno Mussolini. La metamorfosi di un giovane rivoluzionario (in Italian). Rubbettino. ISBN 978-88-498-3910-4. Archived from the original on 19 October 2025 – via Google Books.
- Farrell, Nicholas (2020). Mussolini. Il primo populista della storia (in Italian). Rusconi Libri. ISBN 978-88-18-03428-8. Archived from the original on 19 October 2025 – via Google Books.

=== Interviews ===
- Berlusconi, Silvio (4 September 2003). "Intervista di Berlusconi allo 'Spectator'". La Voce di Cremona (Interview) (in Italian). Interviewed by Farrell, Nicholas; Johnson, Boris. Archived from the original on 10 November 2003 – via Segnalo.it.
- Berlusconi, Silvio (6 September 2003). "Forza Berlusconi!". The Spectator (Interview). Interviewed by Farrell, Nicholas; Johnson, Boris. Archived from the original on 14 September 2019.
- Meloni, Giorgia (20 August 2022). "Prima donna". The Spectator (Interview). Interviewed by Farrell, Nicholas. Archived from the original on 19 October 2025.
