= Secular religion =

Communal belief system without the supernatural

A secular religion, also known as a political religion, is a communal belief system that appears to share common features with enterprises usually thought of as "religious", but which rejects belief in a god or gods and the broader metaphysical aspects of the supernatural, instead placing typical religious qualities in material entities, institutions, or systems. Some secular religions were explicitly identified as such by their founders, including the Religion of Humanity, the Cult of Reason, and the Cult of the Supreme Being. Other ideological systems that have been characterized as secular religions include: various forms of communism (including Maoism and Juche,), scientism, anarchism, fascism, and Nazism.

== Contemporary characterizations ==
The term secular religion is often applied today to communal belief systems—as for example with the view of love as the postmodern secular religion. Paul Vitz applied the term to modern psychology in as much as it fosters a cult of the self, explicitly calling "the self-theory ethic ... this secular religion". Sport has also been considered as a new secular religion, particularly with respect to Olympism. For Pierre de Coubertin, founder of the modern Olympic Games, belief in them as a new secular religion was explicit and lifelong.

== Political religion ==
The theory of political religion concerns governmental ideologies whose cultural and political backing is so intense and strong, well as control that they are said to attain power equivalent to those of a state religion, with which they often exhibit significant similarities in both theory and practice. In addition to basic forms of politics, like parliament and elections, it also holds an aspect of "sacralization" related to the institutions contained within the regime and also provides the inner measures traditionally considered to be religious territory, such as ethics, values, symbols, myths, rituals, archetypes and for example a national liturgical calendar.

Political religious organizations, such as the National Socialist and Communist Parties, adhered to the idealization of cultural and political power over the country at large. The church body of the state no longer held control over the practices of religious identity. Because of this, National Socialism was countered by many political and religious organizations as being a political religion, based on the dominance which the National Socialist regime had (Gates and Steane). Political religions generally vie with existing traditional religions, and may try to replace or eradicate them. The term was given new attention by the political scientist Hans Maier.

Totalitarian societies are perhaps more prone to political religion, but various scholars have described features of political religion even in democracies, for instance American civil religion as described by Robert Bellah in 1967.

The term is sometimes treated as synonymous with civil religion, but although some scholars use the terms equivalently, others see a useful distinction, using "civil religion" as something weaker, which functions more as a socially unifying and essentially conservative force, whereas a political religion is radically transformational, even apocalyptic.

=== Overview ===
The term political religion is based on the observation that sometimes political ideologies or political systems display features more commonly associated with religion. Scholars who have studied these phenomena include William Connolly in political science, Christoph Deutschmann in sociology, Emilio Gentile in history, Oliver O'Donovan in theology and others in psychology. A political religion often occupies the same ethical, psychological and sociological space as a traditional religion, and as a result it often displaces or co-opts existing religious organizations and beliefs. The most central marker of a political religion involves the sacralization of politics, for example an overwhelming religious feeling when serving one's country, or the devotion towards the Founding Fathers of the United States. Although a political religion may co-opt existing religious structures or symbolism, it does not itself have any independent spiritual or theocratic elements—it is essentially secular, using religious motifs and methods for political purposes, if it does not reject religious faith outright. Typically, a political religion is considered to be secular, but more radical forms of it are also transcendental.

=== Origin of the theory ===
The 18th-century philosopher Jean-Jacques Rousseau (1712–1778) argued that all societies need a religion to hold men together. Because Christianity tended to pull men away from earthly matters, Rousseau advocated a "civil religion" that would create the links necessary for political unity around the state. The Swiss Protestant theologian Adolf Keller (1872–1963) argued that Marxism in the Soviet Union had been transformed into a secular religion. Before emigrating to the United States, the German-born political philosopher Eric Voegelin wrote a book entitled The political religions. Other contributions on "political religion" (or associated terms such as "secular religion", "lay religion" or "public religion") were made by Luigi Sturzo (1871–1959), Paul Tillich (1886–1965), Gerhard Leibholz (1901–1982), Waldemar Gurian (1902–1954), Raymond Aron (1905–1983) and Walter Benjamin (1892–1940). Some saw such "religions" as a response to the existential void and nihilism caused by modernity, mass society and the rise of a bureaucratic state, and in political religions "the rebellion against the religion of God" reached its climax. They also described them as "pseudo-religions", "substitute religions", "surrogate religions", "religions manipulated by man" and "anti-religions". Yale political scientist Juan Linz and others have noted that the secularization of the twentieth century had created a void which could be filled by an ideology claiming a hold on ethical and identical matters as well, making the political religions based on totalitarianism, universalism and messianic missions (such as Manifest Destiny) possible.

=== Suppression of religious beliefs ===
Political religions sometimes compete with existing religions, and try, if possible, to replace or eradicate them. Loyalty to other entities, such as a church or a deity, are often viewed as interfering with loyalty to the political religion. The authority of religious leaders also presents a threat to the authority of the political religion. As a result, some or all religious sects may be suppressed or banned. An existing sect may be converted into a state religion, but dogma and personnel may be modified to suit the needs of the party or state.

Juan Linz has posited the friendly form of separation of church and state as the counterpole of political religion but describes the hostile form of separation of church and state as moving toward political religion as found in totalitarianism.

=== Absolute loyalty ===
Loyalty to the state or political party and acceptance of the government/party ideology are paramount. Dissenters may be expelled, ostracized, discriminated against, imprisoned, "re-educated", or killed. Loyalty oaths or membership in a dominant (or sole) political party may be required for employment, obtaining government services, or simply as routine. Criticism of the government may be a serious crime. Enforcement can range from ostracism by one's neighbours to execution. In a political religion, you are either with the system or against it.

=== Cult of personality ===
A political religion often elevates its leaders to near-godlike status. Displays of leaders in the form of posters or statues may be mandated in public areas and even private homes. Children may be required to learn the state's version of the leaders' biographies in school.

=== Myths of origin ===
Political religions often rely on a myth of origin that may have some historical basis but is usually idealized and sacralized. Current leaders may be venerated as descendants of the original fathers. There may also be holy places or shrines that relate to the myth of origin.

== Historical cases ==
=== Revolutionary France ===
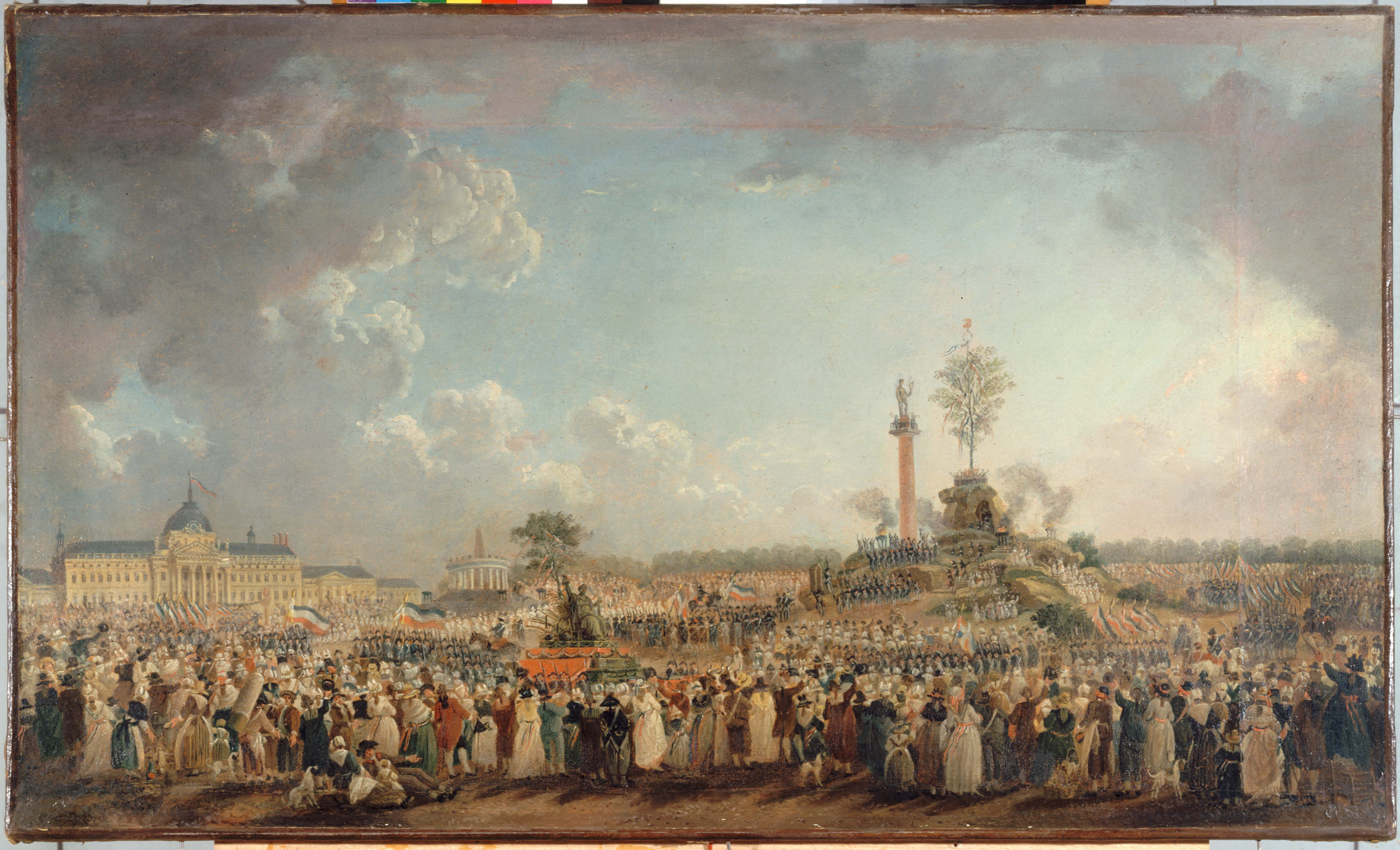
The Festival of the Supreme Being, by Pierre-Antoine Demachy

Revolutionary France was well noted for being the first state to reject religion altogether. Radicals intended to replace Christianity with a new state religion, or a deistic ideology. Maximilien Robespierre rejected atheistic ideologies and intended to create a new religion. Churches were closed, and Catholic Mass was forbidden. The Cult of the Supreme Being was well known for its derided festival, which led to the Thermidorian reaction and the fall of Robespierre.

=== Fascism ===
==== Italian fascism ====
According to Emilio Gentile, "Fascism was the first and prime instance of a modern political religion." "This religion sacralized the state and assigned it the primary educational task of transforming the mentality, the character, and the customs of Italians. The aim was to create a 'new man', a believer in and an observing member of the cult of Fascism."

"The argument [that fascism was a 'political religion'] tends to involve three main claims: I) that fascism was characterized by a religious form, particularly in terms of language and ritual; II) that fascism was a sacralized form of totalitarianism, which legitimized violence in defence of the nation and regeneration of a fascist 'new man'; and III) that fascism took on many of the functions of religion for a broad swathe of society."

==== Nazi Germany ====
"Among committed [Nazi] believers, a mythic world of eternally strong heroes, demons, fire and sword—in a word, the fantasy world of the nursery—displaced reality." Heinrich Himmler was fascinated by the occult, and sought to turn the SS into the basis of an official state cult.

=== Soviet Union ===
In 1936 a Protestant priest referred explicitly to communism as a new secular religion. A couple of years later, on the eve of World War II, F. A. Voigt characterised both Marxism and National Socialism as secular religions, akin at a fundamental level in their authoritarianism and messianic beliefs as well as in their eschatological view of human History. Both, he considered, were waging religious war against the liberal enquiring mind of the European heritage.

After the war, the social philosopher Raymond Aron would expand on the exploration of communism in terms of a secular religion; while A. J. P. Taylor, for example, would characterise it as "a great secular religion....the Communist Manifesto must be counted as a holy book in the same class as the Bible".

Klaus-Georg Riegel argued that "Lenin's utopian design of a revolutionary community of virtuosi as a typical political religion of an intelligentsia longing for an inner-worldly salvation, a socialist paradise without exploitation and alienation, to be implanted in the Russian backward society at the outskirts of the industrialised and modernised Western Europe."

== See also ==
- Ideocracy
- Irreligion
- Mandate of Heaven
- American civil religion
- Nontheistic religion
- Political symbolism
- Separation of church and state
- Statolatry
- State atheism
