= Deutschmann =

Deutschmann is a German surname. Notable people with the surname include:

- Cara Deutschmann (born 2000), Austrian person of the year
- Christoph Deutschmann (born 1946), German sociologist
- Johann Deutschmann (1625–1706), German Lutheran theologian
- Josef Deutschmann (1920–1997), Austrian cross-country skier
- René Deutschmann (born 1951), French footballer
