= Clubs of Good Government =

The Clubs of Good Government (Circoli del Buon Governo) were a grassroots organization within The People of Freedom, a political party in Italy.

The Clubs are led by Marcello Dell'Utri, one of the seven founding members of Forza Italia along with Silvio Berlusconi. They were first launched in 1999, within Forza Italia, "in order to contribute to the development and circulation of liberal culture". Through these circles Dell'Utri, along with other grassroots networks, has been able to elect young people to the Italian Parliament, notably including Nicola Formichella.

== See also ==
- Dellutriani
