= Mussolini diaries =

Forged diaries purportedly written by Benito Mussolini

The Mussolini diaries are several forged diaries of Italian fascist dictator Benito Mussolini. Although the two best known cases of forged Mussolini diaries are those of 1957 and 2007, other forgeries were discovered and as a result their publications was refused. Despite this, a number of individuals supported the unsubstantiated claim that the diaries are authentic. The 1957 diaries were produced by Amalia and Rosa Panvini, who were later convicted for the forgery. In 2007, Italian Senator Marcello Dell'Utri claimed to have found another set of diaries from 1935 to 1939, but most historians urged caution about the claim.

== History ==
In 1957, Amalia and Rosa Panvini (a mother and daughter) produced thirty volumes of what they later claimed were Mussolini's diaries; these diaries apparently fooled Mussolini's son and an expert. At first, it was believed that the large number of volumes in themselves were evidence that they were not forgeries; it was later discovered that these diaries had in fact been forged, and Amalia and Rosa Panvini were convicted in 1960. In February 2007, the then Italian Senator Marcello Dell'Utri claimed that diaries, covering the years from 1935 to 1939, had been found. Moreover, he alleged that these Mussolini diaries were with a lawyer at Bellinzona in the Italian-speaking part of Switzerland. He said he examined the diaries and found that the "handwriting is clear and recognisably" that of Mussolini, although it was "a bit hurried". Dell'Utri stated that his claim was supported by an unknown handwriting expert. He further alleged that the diaries had been found in a suitcase Mussolini was carrying when he was caught by partisans of the Italian resistance movement in Dongo at Lake Como, while he was fleeing to Switzerland in April 1945. The books had allegedly been hidden by one of the partisans who had recently died. Most historians immediately urged cautions about the claims.

These diaries generated much interest among historians as it appeared that Mussolini reluctantly brought Italy into World War II and that he had tried to prevent the war. The diaries were also received with scepticism as they had not been authenticated independently. This scepticism was made more acute by memories of the 1957 forgery and the forged Adolf Hitler's diaries case in 1983. Later in February, Italian historians Emilio Gentile and Roberto Travaglini independently discovered that these diaries had in fact been forged. Gentile and Travaglini said that these diaries had been around for some time and that someone had tried to sell them to journalists, auction houses, and publishing houses before offering them to Dell'Utri; they had already been offered to The Times in 1980, Sotheby's in 1990, Feltrinelli in 1992, and L'Espresso in 2004, all of which rejected them as forgeries. According to Gentile, the diaries contain "historical errors" and the authors "seem to have copied various articles from old newspapers". According to Travaglini, "there were too many elements that did not match up".

Dell'Utri is the owner of the diaries and still claims them to be authentic. In 2010, Dell'Utri claimed to have found the latest Mussolini diary, dated 1942 and found in Switzerland. He said that it had similar style and handwriting to the other five covering the 1935–1939 years and "the same sharp and precise writing". Then-Italian Prime Minister Silvio Berlusconi, who was a close friend to Dell'Utri, also claimed their authenticity and went so far to quote them in a 2010 OSCE meeting in Paris. Several people close to Berlusconi, such as editor Elizabetta Sgarbi and the right-wing newspaper Libero (which distributed copies of the books to its readers in 2011), tried to defend the authenticity of the diaries despite scholarly agreement that they are a forgery. Also in 2010, Nicholas Burgess Farrell, a British journalist living in Italy and author of a historical revisionist biography of Mussolini, argued with Marco Travaglio and Malcom Pagani in favour of the authenticity of the diaries, which appeared to support his more sympathetic thesis in his 2003 book. Farrell made the unsupported claim that noted British historian Denis Mack Smith, who was critical of his book, told him that the diaries were true.

== See also ==
- Hitler Diaries
