= Matacena =

Matacena is a surname. Notable people with the surname include:

- Amedeo Matacena (1963–2022), Italian politician
- Orestes Matacena (born 1941), Cuban-American actor, writer, producer, and director
