= Giuseppe Pisanu =

Italian politician

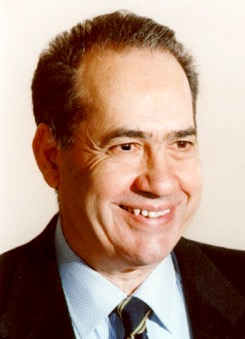

Minister of the Interior
- In office 3 July 2002 – 17 May 2006
- Prime Minister: Silvio Berlusconi
- Preceded by: Claudio Scajola
- Succeeded by: Giuliano Amato

Minister for the Implementation of the Government Program
- In office 10 June 2001 – 3 July 2002
- Prime Minister: Silvio Berlusconi
- Preceded by: Franco Bassanini
- Succeeded by: Claudio Scajola

Member of the Senate of the Republic
- In office 28 April 2006 – 14 March 2013

Member of the Chamber of Deputies
- In office 25 May 1972 – 22 April 1992
- In office 15 April 1994 – 27 April 2006

Personal details
- Born: 2 January 1937 (age 89) Ittiri, Sassari, Italy
- Party: Civic Choice (2013)
- Other political affiliations: Christian Democracy (until 1994); Forza Italia (1994-2009); The People of Freedom (2009-2012)
- Education: University of Sassari

Giuseppe "Beppe" Pisanu (born 2 January 1937 in Ittiri, province of Sassari) is an Italian politician, longtime member of the Chamber of Deputies for the Christian Democracy (1972–1992) and then for Forza Italia (1994–2006).

== Biography ==
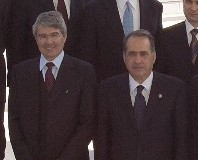
Roberto Castelli and Giuseppe Pisanu (11 May 2004, Washington, D.C.)

Pisanu graduated in Agricultural sciences from the University of Sassari. He was the top aide to Benigno Zaccagnini, leader of the left wing of the Christian Democracy and national secretary of the party from 1975 to 1980. He served as Under-secretary of State for Treasury from 1980 and 1983 and as Under-secretary of State for Defense from 1986 to 1989.

In 1994 he joined Forza Italia, of which he was vice-president (1994–96) and President of faction (1996–2001) in the Chamber of Deputies. In 2001 he was appointed Minister for the Implementation of the Government Program in the Berlusconi II government. Subsequently, from 2002 to 2006, he served as Minister of the Interior in the second and third Berlusconi government. He was also the president of the Antimafia Commission from 2008 to 2013.

== The P2-Banco Ambrosiano scandal ==
In 1983 Pisanu was forced to resign as an undersecretary for the P2 scandal, for his relations with Flavio Carboni, with Roberto Calvi, and with the Banco Ambrosiano crack. According to MPs Sergio Flamigni and Michele Caccavale, in the early 80s Pisanu, then Undersecretary of the Treasury, was the political godfather of Flavio Carboni, Sardinian hustler in relations with members of the Mafia and with members of the Magliana Gang, and in business with Silvio Berlusconi.

Pisanu was not investigated by the judiciary for the scandal. He was interviewed several times by the Anselmi commission, and admitted only that he has somewhat "underestimated" the delicacy of certain acquaintances.

== Honours and awards ==
- Italy: Knight Grand Cross of the Sacred Military Constantinian Order of Saint George

Political offices
Preceded by Franco Bassanini	Minister for the Implementation of the Government Program; 2001 - 2002	Succeeded by Claudio Scajola
Preceded by Claudio Scajola	Italian Minister of the Interior; 2002-2006	Succeeded by Giuliano Amato
