= Via Palestro massacre =

Terrorist attack in Milan

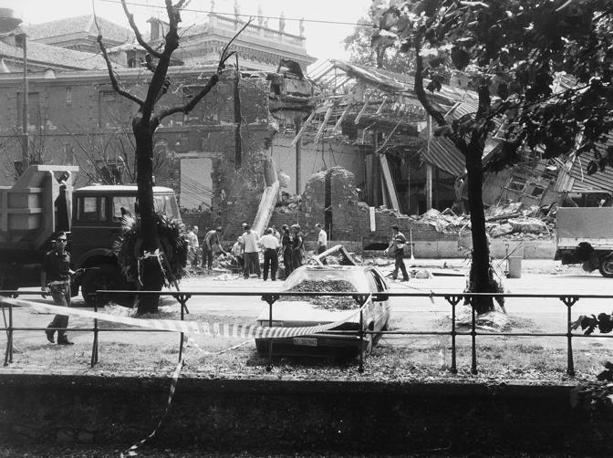
- The aftermath of the bombing
- Location: Milan, Lombardy, Italy
- Date: 27 July 1993
- Attack type: Car bombing
- Weapon: Explosives
- Deaths: 5
- Injuries: 12

The Via Palestro massacre (Italian: Strage di Via Palestro) was a terrorist attack carried out by Cosa Nostra in Milan on the evening of 27 July 1993. The explosion of a car bomb in Via Palestro, near the Galleria d'Arte Moderna, resulted in the killing of five people (firemen Carlo La Catena, Sergio Pasotto and Stefano Picerno, the municipal guard Alessandro Ferrari and Driss Moussafir, a Moroccan immigrant who was sleeping on a bench) and the wounding of twelve.

== The bomb ==
In May 1993 some mafiosi from the Brancaccio and Corso dei Mille families (Giuseppe Barranca, Gaspare Spatuzza, Cosimo Lo Nigro, Francesco Giuliano) worked to make another explosive in a dilapidated house at Corso dei Mille, made available by Antonino Mangano (boss of the family of Roccella); in mid-July, the two explosive bales were hidden in the bed of a truck belonging to Pietro Carra (a hauler who was gravitating around the mobs of Brancaccio), who carried them to Arluno, in the then province of Milan, along with Lo Nigro, who brought with him a fuse and other material: at Arluno, Carra and Nigro were reached by a person who led them into a country road, where they dropped the explosive. On 27 July Nigro and Giuliano arrived in Rome, coming from Milan, to organize the attacks on the churches of St. John Lateran and San Giorgio in Velabro. On the evening of 27 July, the municipal guard Alessandro Ferrari noticed the presence of a Fiat Uno (stolen a few hours before) parked in via Palestro, in front of the Padiglione d'Arte Contemporanea, from which whitish smoke was coming out, requested the intervention of the Fire Brigade who found a weapon in the car; however, a few moments later at 11:14 pm, the car bomb exploded and killed the guard Alessandro Ferrari and firefighters Carlo La Catena, Sergio Pasotto and Stefano Picerno but also the Moroccan immigrant Driss Moussafir, who was hit by a piece of sheet metal as he slept on a bench. There were also twelve people wounded. The blast wave crushed the windows of the surrounding houses and also damaged some of the rooms of the nearby Galleria d'Arte Moderna, causing the collapse of the outer wall of the Padiglione. During the night, a gas bag formed after the breakup of a pipeline caused another explosion with enormous damage to the Padiglione, the paintings hosted in it and the surrounding Villa Belgiojoso Bonaparte.

== Investigations and trials ==
The investigations reconstructed the execution of the Via Palestro massacre on the basis of statements made by the pentiti Pietro Carra, Antonio Scarano, Emanuele Di Natale and Umberto Maniscalco: in 1998 Cosimo Lo Nigro, Giuseppe Barranca, Francesco Giuliano, Gaspare Spatuzza, Luigi Giacalone, Salvatore Benigno, Antonio Scarano, Antonino Mangano and Salvatore Grigoli were recognized as material performers of the massacre in the 1993 judgment; However, in the same judgment, it reads: "[...] Unfortunately, the failure to identify the basis of operations in Milan and the subjects who in this city certainly had logistical support and manual contribution to the massacre did not allow to penetrate those realities that, as evidenced by the investigation carried out in other events at the examination of this Court, have proved to be more promising in terms of external verification". In 2002, according to statements made by Carra and Scarano, the Prosecutor Office of Florence ordered the arrest of the brothers Tommaso and Giovanni Formoso ("Men of Honor" of Misilmeri), identified by investigations as those who helped Lo Nigro in the discharge of the explosive at Arluno and who physically carried out the Via Palestro massacre. In 2003, the tribunal of Milan condemned the Formoso brothers to life imprisonment, and this conviction was confirmed in the next two levels of judgment. In 2008, Gaspare Spatuzza began collaborating with justice and provided new declarations on the material performers of the Via Palestro massacre: in particular, Spatuzza reported that himself, Cosimo Lo Nigro, Francesco Giuliano, Giovanni Formoso, and the brothers Vittorio and Marcello Tutino (mafiosi of Brancaccio) attended a meeting where the groups that had to operate on Rome or Milan to carry out the attacks were decided; according to Spatuzza, Formoso and Tutino brothers operated on Milan and at first he, Lo Nigro and Giuliano, came to help them unload the explosive and the theft of the Fiat Uno used in the attack, and then returned to Rome in order to carry out the attacks to the churches. Spatuzza later also dismissed Tommaso Formoso, stating that only the brother Giovanni was involved in the attack, borrowing by Tommaso with an excuse the Arluno's chalet where the explosive was unloaded. However, in April 2012, the tribunal of Brescia rejected the request for review of the trial to Tommaso Formoso, arguing that the only statements of Spatuzza were not sufficient. Also based on the statements of Spatuzza, in 2012 the Prosecutor Office of Florence ordered the arrest of the fisherman Cosimo D'Amato, cousin of Cosimo Lo Nigro, who was accused of having supplied the explosive, extracted from unexploded munitions recovered from the sea, which was used in all the attacks of 1992–93, including the Via Palestro massacre. In 2013, D'Amato was sentenced to life imprisonment by the tribunal of Florence.

== Commemorations ==
On 27 July 2013, twenty years after the explosion, a commemorative plaque was placed on the site of the massacre with the names of the victims, as well as the gardens of via Morgagni, located about one kilometer from the site of the attack, were named after the victims of the massacre. On the thirtieth anniversary in 2023, in tandem with prayer services and official events commemorating the attack, Pope Francis issued a letter recalling the bombing and expressing gratitude for those who "in the fulfillment of their duty, sometimes risking their lives, devoted themselves to the protection of the community." In particular, he praised those "who believed in and defended the founding values of a democracy, those of justice and liberty," and, called for opposition to "the many forms of illegality and abuse that unfortunately still beset contemporary society."

In July 2023, on the 30th anniversary of the attack, the Padiglione d'Arte Contemporanea dedicated a special edition of its program, Performing PAC, to commemorating the tragedy.
