= Salvatore Cancemi =

Italian organized crime figure

Salvatore Cancemi

Salvatore Cancemi (Italian pronunciation: [salvaˈtoːre kanˈtʃɛːmi]; 19 March 1942 – 14 January 2011) was an Italian mobster and member of the Sicilian Mafia from Palermo. He is the first member of the Sicilian Mafia Commission who turned himself in voluntarily to become a pentito, a collaborator with the Italian judicial authorities. Cancemi made controversial allegations about the collusion of Prime Minister Silvio Berlusconi and his right-hand man Marcello Dell'Utri with the Mafia.

== Mafia career ==
Cancemi's relatives had no tradition within the Mafia; his father had set up a thriving butcher shop. Cancemi was initiated into the Porta Nuova Mafia family in 1976 at the age of 34. His godfather was Vittorio Mangano. In 1985 he replaced Giuseppe Calò in the Cupola (the Sicilian Mafia Commission) and as head of the mandamento of Porta Nuova that included the Mafia families of Palermo Centro and Borgo Vecchio.

In 1976 Cancemi was sent to jail for stealing a load of meat from a butcher who had refused to pay the pizzo – protection money. In prison, Tommaso Buscetta took care of the freshly-initiated Cancemi. Twenty years later, when Cancemi was reunited with Buscetta during a trial in 1993, he confessed that he had strangled two of Buscetta's sons in 1982, on the orders of Totò Riina. Buscetta embraced Cancemi and said, "You could not refuse the order. I forgive you because I know what it means to be in Cosa Nostra."

Cancemi was involved in the murders of anti-mafia magistrates Giovanni Falcone and Paolo Borsellino in 1992. He acted as a look-out for the team that placed and detonated the bomb at Capaci, which killed Falcone, his wife and three men of his escort. Cancemi described the victory celebration that followed the Capaci bombing. Totò Riina ordered Champagne and while the others toasted, Cancemi and another future pentito Santino Di Matteo looked at one another and exchanged a gloomy assessment of Riina and their future: "This cuckold will be the ruin of us all." Cancemi was sentenced to 21 years in prison in 1997.

== Pentito ==
On 22 July 1993, Cancemi walked into the Carabinieri station on Piazza Verdi in Palermo and turned himself in. Riina had been arrested on 15 January that year and his followers stepped up the terrorist strategy that had been started the year before with the killing of Falcone and Borsellino after the Maxi Trial sentence had been confirmed. He also surrendered his fortune which was estimated to be worth GBP 33 million.

On 28 May 1993, the Mafia detonated a bomb severely damaging the Uffizi Gallery in Florence starting a series of bomb attacks on places of cultural heritage. A few days after Cancemi's surrender bombs detonated at the Villa Reale Museum and the Pavilion of Contemporary Art in Milan, on 27 July and the Church of San Giorgio and the Lateran Vicariate in Rome on 28 July. In total, the attacks left 10 people dead and 93 injured.

Cancemi opposed the violent terrorist strategy and feared for his life because he had said so. Riina's brother-in-law Leoluca Bagarella also suspected that Cancemi had been behind the arrest of the Mafia boss.

== Controversial declarations ==
Many of Cancemi's allegations are controversial. Cancemi told prosecutors that the choice of the 1993 mainland bomb targets had been "suggested" to Cosa Nostra since the organisation did not possess sufficient "refinement" to select them autonomously. He said that Totò Riina and others had implied that they had support from individuals inside the state institutions. Riina and Provenzano told him that they had found "political contacts" through which things would improve and legislation regarding the harsh Article 41-bis prison regime would be changed.

In 1996, Cancemi declared that Silvio Berlusconi and his right-hand man Marcello Dell'Utri were in direct contact with Riina who ordered the bombings which killed Antimafia magistrates, Giovanni Falcone and Paolo Borsellino. After a two-year investigation, magistrates closed the inquiry without charges in 2002. They did not find evidence to corroborate Cancemi's allegations. Similarly, a two-year investigation, also launched on evidence from Cancemi, into Berlusconi's alleged association with the Mafia was closed in 1996. However, most of the allegations have been confirmed by the 2018 trial on the negotiation between the Italian State and Cosa Nostra.

Salvatore Cancemi disclosed that Fininvest, through Marcello Dell'Utri and mafioso Vittorio Mangano, had paid Cosa Nostra 200 million lire (100,000 euro) annually. The alleged contacts, according to Cancemi, were to lead to legislation favourable to Cosa Nostra, in particular the proposed reforms to the harsh Article 41-bis prison regime. The underlying premise was that Cosa Nostra would support Berlusconi's Forza Italia party in return for political favours.

Despite convictions for participating in several murders, for instance, the ones on Christian Democrat politician Salvatore Lima (DC - Democrazia Cristiana), the magistrates Giovanni Falcone and Paolo Borsellino, and police officer Ninni Cassarà, Cancemi was not incarcerated. When asked about the current apparent 'pax mafiosa', Salvatore Cancemi said: "I find this silence more terrifying than the bombs."

== Death ==
He died on 14 January 2011, of a stroke in the safe house where he had been staying as a government witness.

== Biography ==
- (in Italian) Riina mi fece i nomi di… Confessioni di un ex boss della Cupola (2002) Salvatore Cancemi and Giorgio Bongiovanni, Massari editore, ISBN 88-457-0178-6
