= Gaspare Spatuzza =

Member of the Sicilian Mafia and later pentito (born 1964)

- Spatuzza at his arrest on 2 July 1997
- Born: 8 April 1964 (age 62); Palermo, Italy
- Other name: The Bald (u tignusu)
- Occupation: Mafia boss
- Status: Imprisoned since 1997
- Convictions: Mafia association, multiple murder
- Criminal charges: Mafia association, multiple murder
- Penalty: Life imprisonment

Gaspare Spatuzza (born 8 April 1964) is a Sicilian mafioso from the Brancaccio quarter in Palermo. He was an assassin for the brothers Filippo and Giuseppe Graviano who headed the Mafia family of Brancaccio. After the arrest of the Gravianos in January 1994, he apparently succeeded them as the regent of the Mafia family. He was arrested in 1997 and started to cooperate with the judicial authorities in 2008. In his testimony, he stated that media tycoon and then prime minister Silvio Berlusconi made a deal with the Sicilian Mafia in 1993 that put the country in the hands of Cosa Nostra.

== Mafia killer ==
Spatuzza is convicted of six bomb attacks and 40 homicides. He confessed the murder of the parish priest, Father Pino Puglisi, on 15 September 1993. Puglisi was the pastor of San Gaetano's Parish in the rough Palermo neighbourhood of Brancaccio, and spoke out against the Mafia. Spatuzza was arrested in July 1997. On 14 April 1998, Spatuzza, Nino Mangano, Cosimo Lo Nigro, and Luigi Giacalone received life sentences for the killing of father Puglisi. He was also convicted for the murder of the young son of state witness Santino Di Matteo, Giuseppe, who had been kidnapped and killed after 779 days in a failed attempt to force the father to retract his testimony on the Capaci bombing that killed Antimafia judge Giovanni Falcone. At the trial, Spatuzza had also asked Di Matteo's family for forgiveness. In 2012, Spatuzza was sentenced to 12 years in prison for his role in the murder.

In the 1990s, Spatuzza was involved in a series of bomb attacks as part of a campaign of terror in 1993 against the state to get them to back off in their crackdown against the Mafia after the murders of Antimafia magistrates Paolo Borsellino and Falcone in 1992. In June 1998, Spatuzza received a life sentence for the 1993 Via dei Georgofili bombing in Florence, the Via Palestro massacre in Milan, and in the churches of St. John Lateran and San Giorgio in Velabro in Rome, which left 10 people dead and 93 injured, as well as damage to centres of cultural heritage like the Uffizi Gallery.

== Pentito ==
In October 2008, it became known that Spatuzza had turned into a witness for the prosecution (pentito) four months earlier after spending 11 years in jail under the Article 41-bis prison regime. He said he had become religious in prison; facing "a choice between God and the Cosa Nostra", he chose to cooperate and tell the truth. He enrolled in theology courses in 2009.

Spatuzza admitted he had stolen the Fiat 126 used for the car bomb that killed Borsellino in the Via D'Amelio bombing in Palermo on 19 July 1992. His admission contradicted the declarations of a thug with loose Mafia associations who had confessed to stealing the car. When confronted with Spatuzza's statement, the thug admitted that he had repeated what some investigating officers had forced him to tell the magistrates. Spatuzza's detailed testimony stood up against examination. Spatuzza's declaration led to the re-opening of the trial on Borsellino's murder, which was concluded in 2003.

== Dealing with Silvio Berlusconi ==
Spatuzza's boss Giuseppe Graviano told him in 1994 that future prime minister Silvio Berlusconi was bargaining with the Mafia, concerning a political-electoral agreement between Cosa Nostra and Berlusconi's party Forza Italia, in exchange for certain guarantees, such as to stop the bomb terror campaign. Berlusconi entered politics a few months later and won his first term as the prime minister of Italy in 1994. Spatuzza said Graviano disclosed the information to him during a conversation in a bar Graviano owned in the upscale Via Veneto district of the Italian capital Rome. According to Spatuzza, Berlusconi's right-hand man Marcello Dell'Utri was the intermediary. Dell'Utri dismissed Spatuzza's allegations as nonsense.

Spatuzza's assertions back up previous statements of the pentito Antonino Giuffrè, who said that the Graviano brothers were the intermediaries between Cosa Nostra and Berlusconi. Cosa Nostra decided to back Berlusconi's Forza Italia party from its foundation in 1993, in exchange for help in resolving the Mafia's judicial problems. The Mafia turned to Forza Italia when its traditional contacts in the discredited Christian Democracy party proved unable to protect its members from the rigours of the law. In response, Berlusconi's lawyer and member of Parliament for The People of Freedom party Niccolò Ghedini said: "The statements given by Spatuzza about prime minister Berlusconi are baseless and can be in no way verified."

On 4 December 2009, Spatuzza repeated his accusations in court at the appeal hearing against Dell'Utri, who was sentenced to 9 years in 2004, for collusion with the Mafia. Testifying from behind a screen in the courtroom, surrounded by several bodyguards, he declared: "Graviano told me the name of Berlusconi and said that thanks to him and the man from our home town [an apparent reference to Dell'Utri] we have the country in our hands." Dell'Utri told the court that neither he nor Berlusconi had Mafia connections. He said: "It's in the interest of the Mafia to force the collapse of the Berlusconi government because this government has done the most in the fight against organised crime." Berlusconi denounced the claims of Spatuzza as "vile ... unfounded and defamatory". On 11 December 2009, Filippo Graviano denied the assertions of Spatuzza before the court of Palermo. He said that he had never met Dell'Utri directly or indirectly.

== See also ==
- Vittorio Mangano
