= List of mayors of Imperia =

Mayor of Imperia
- Sindaco di Imperia

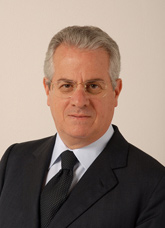
- Incumbent; Claudio Scajola since 27 June 2018
- Appointer: Popular election
- Term length: 5 years, renewable once
- Formation: September 1861
- Website: Official website

The mayor of Imperia is an elected politician who, along with the Imperia City Council, is accountable for the strategic government of Imperia in Liguria, Italy.

The current mayor is Claudio Scajola, former Minister in many Silvio Berlusconi's cabinets and a centre-right independent, who took office on 27 June 2018.

== Overview ==
According to the Italian Constitution, the mayor of Imperia is member of the City Council.

The mayor is elected by the population of Imperia, who also elects the members of the City Council, controlling the mayor's policy guidelines and is able to enforce his resignation by a motion of no confidence. The mayor is entitled to appoint and release the members of his government.

Since 1995 the mayor is elected directly by Imperia's electorate: in all mayoral elections in Italy in cities with a population higher than 15,000 the voters express a direct choice for the mayor or an indirect choice voting for the party of the candidate's coalition. If no candidate receives at least 50% of votes, the top two candidates go to a second round after two weeks. The election of the City Council is based on a direct choice for the candidate with a preference vote: the candidate with the majority of the preferences is elected. The number of the seats for each party is determined proportionally.

== Italian Republic (since 1946) ==
=== City Council election (1946-1995) ===
From 1946 to 1995, the mayor of Imperia was elected by the City Council.

	Mayor	Term start	Term end	Party
1	Goffredo Alterisio	7 April 1946	27 May 1951	PCI
2	Ferdinando Scajola	27 May 1951	15 November 1954	DC
3	Bruno Agen	15 November 1954	30 May 1956	DC
4	Carlo Gonan	30 May 1956	22 December 1961	DC
5	Giorgio Luciano Verda	22 December 1961	7 July 1970	DC
6	Giovanni Parodi	7 July 1970	21 May 1974	DC
7	Alessandro Scajola	21 May 1974	15 July 1975	DC
8	Giuseppe Mauro Torelli	15 July 1975	3 March 1976	PCI
9	Francesco Ruscigni	3 March 1976	7 April 1976	PSI
10	Giuseppe Vassallo	7 April 1976	18 April 1977	DC
(7)	Alessandro Scajola	18 April 1977	7 April 1979	DC
11	Bartolomeo Re	7 April 1979	8 July 1980	DC
12	Renato Pilade	8 July 1980	29 October 1983	DC
13	Claudio Scajola	29 October 1983	18 December 1983	DC
14	Giovanni Barbagallo	18 December 1983	2 July 1986	PSI
15	Giovanni Gramondo	2 July 1986	7 July 1990	DC
(13)	Claudio Scajola	7 July 1990	8 May 1995	DC

=== Direct election (since 1995) ===
Since 1995, under provisions of new local administration law, the mayor of Imperia is chosen by direct election, originally every four, then every five years.

	Mayor	Term start	Term end	Party	Coalition	Election
16	Davide Berio	8 May 1995	14 June 1999	PDS	PDS • PRC • FdV	1995
17	Luigi Sappa	14 June 1999	14 June 2004	FI; PdL	FI • AN • CCD • RI	1999
17	Luigi Sappa	14 June 2004	9 June 2009	FI; PdL	FI • AN • UDC	2004
18	Paolo Strescino	9 June 2009	15 May 2012 (Note: Resigned after suffering a vote of no confidence in the City Council.)	PdL	PdL • LN	2009
Special Prefectural Commissioner tenure (15 May 2012 – 10 June 2013)
19	Carlo Capacci	10 June 2013	27 June 2018	Ind	PD	2013
(13)	Claudio Scajola	27 June 2018	1 June 2023	Ind	Ind	2018
(13)	Claudio Scajola	1 June 2023	Incumbent	Ind	FI • FdI • NM • Lega	2023
