= Giovanni Giuliano =

Italian politician (1949–2022)

President of the Province of Imperia
- In office 13 May 2001 – 18 January 2010
- Preceded by: Bruno Sbordone
- Succeeded by: Umberto Calandrella

Personal details
- Born: 4 June 1949 Sanremo, Italy
- Died: 11 March 2022 (aged 72)
- Party: FI; PdL

Giovanni Giuliano (4 June 1949 – 11 March 2022) was an Italian politician. A member of Forza Italia and The People of Freedom, he served as President of the Province of Imperia from 2001 to 2010. He died on 11 March 2022, at the age of 72.
