= Antonio Marzano =

Italian economist and politician (born 1935)

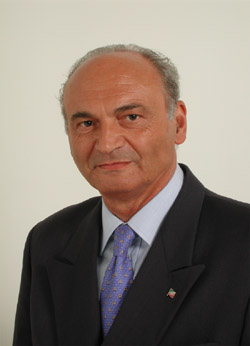

Minister of Productive Activities
- In office 11 June 2001 – 23 April 2005
- Prime Minister: Silvio Berlusconi
- Preceded by: Enrico Letta
- Succeeded by: Claudio Scajola

Personal details
- Born: 18 February 1935 (age 91) Rome, Kingdom of Italy
- Party: Forza Italia

Antonio Marzano (born 18 February 1935) is an Italian economist, academic and politician, who served as the minister of productive activities in the second cabinet of Silvio Berlusconi from 2001 to 2005.

== Early life and education ==
Marzano was born in Rome on 18 February 1935. He holds a law degree.

== Career ==
Marzano is an economist by profession. He worked at Abruzzi University from 1968 to 1971. He became the professor of economic and financial politics at the University of Rome in 1974 and professor of economic policy at the LUISS University of Rome in 1978. He is a member of the Forza Italia. He was the economic advisor to Silvio Berlusconi in the 1990s. In 1996, he became a member of the Italian Parliament.

Marzano was appointed minister of productive activities to the cabinet led by Prime Minister Berlusconi in 2001. The same year he was again elected to the Parliament. Claudio Scajola replaced him minister of productive activities on 23 April 2005. Then Marzano became a member of the CNEL (National Council for Economics and Labour). His tenure in the parliament ended in 2005. He was appointed president of the CNEL on 22 July 2005 and served in the post until 2010.

In 2009 Marzano was named as the president of International Association of Economic and Social Councils and Similar Institutions (AICESIS) and became its honorary president in 2011. He is a member of the Italy-USA Foundation.

== Work ==
Marzano is the author of nearly 150 books most of which focus on economics and finance.

== Awards and honors ==
Marzano is the recipient of various awards and honors, including Grand Officer of the Order of Merit of the Italian Republic.
