= List of presidents of the Province of Imperia =

President of the Province of Imperia
- Presidente della Provincia di Imperia

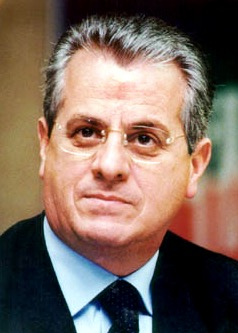
- Incumbent; Claudio Scajola since 19 December 2021
- Term length: 4 years
- Formation: 1889

The president of the Province of Imperia is the head of the provincial government in Imperia, Liguria, Italy. The president oversees the administration of the province, coordinates the activities of the municipalities, and represents the province in regional and national matters.

Since December 2021, the office has been held by Claudio Scajola of Forza Italia party.

== List ==
=== Presidents of the Provincial Deputation (1889–1926) ===
No.	Portrait	Name	Term start	Term end	Party
1		Luigi Ramoino	1889	1899	?
2		Michele Ameglio	1899	1914	?
3		Carlo Falciola	1914	?	?

=== Presidents of the Provincial Deputation (1945–1951) ===
No.	Portrait	Name	Term start	Term end	Party
1		Filippo Gazzano	1945	1945	?
2		Stefano Berio	1945	1951	?

=== Presidents of the Province (1951–present) ===
No.	Portrait	Name	Term start	Term end	Party
1		Stefano Berio	1951	1955	?
2		Guido Roggero	1955	1965	Christian Democracy
3		Manfredo Manfredi	1965	1975	Christian Democracy
4		Giovanni Battista Novaro	1975	1981	Christian Democracy
5		Leone Pippione	1981	October 1984	Christian Democracy
6		Luciano De Michelis	October 1984	1995	Christian Democracy
7		Gabriele Boscetto	1995	1999	Forza Italia
7		Gabriele Boscetto	1999	February 2001	Forza Italia
–		Bruno Sbordone	February 2001	13 May 2001	Special commissioner
8		Giovanni Giuliano	13 May 2001	31 May 2006	Forza Italia; The People of Freedom
8		Giovanni Giuliano	31 May 2006	21 January 2010	Forza Italia; The People of Freedom
–		Umberto Calandrella	21 January 2010	29 March 2010	Special commissioner
9		Luigi Sappa	29 March 2010	5 May 2015	The People of Freedom; Forza Italia
10		Fabio Natta	5 May 2015	12 May 2019	Italian Socialist Party
11		Domenico Abbo	12 May 2019	4 October 2021	Democratic Party
12		Claudio Scajola	19 December 2021	18 December 2025	Independent (centre-right); Forza Italia
12		Claudio Scajola	18 December 2025	Incumbent	Independent (centre-right); Forza Italia

== Sources ==
- "Storia amministrativa dell'ente". Ministero dell'Interno.
- Menichini, Piera (2005). "I presidenti delle Province dall'Unità alla Grande guerra: repertorio analitico". Storia Amministrazione Costituzione (13): 278–279.
