= Claudio Scajola =

Italian politician (born 1948)

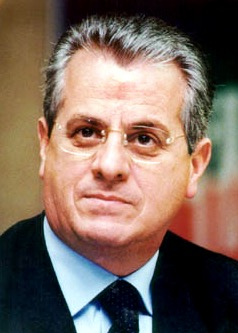

Mayor of Imperia
- Incumbent
- Assumed office 27 June 2018
- Preceded by: Carlo Capacci
- In office 7 July 1990 – 8 May 1995
- Preceded by: Giovanni Gramondo
- Succeeded by: Davide Berio
- In office 29 October 1983 – 18 December 1983
- Preceded by: Renato Pilade
- Succeeded by: Giovanni Barbagallo

President of the Province of Imperia
- Incumbent
- Assumed office 19 December 2021
- Preceded by: Domenico Abbo

Minister of Productive Activities
- In office 8 May 2008 – 4 May 2010
- Prime Minister: Silvio Berlusconi
- Preceded by: Pier Luigi Bersani
- Succeeded by: Paolo Romani
- In office 23 April 2005 – 17 May 2006
- Prime Minister: Silvio Berlusconi
- Preceded by: Antonio Marzano
- Succeeded by: Pier Luigi Bersani

Minister of the Interior
- In office 11 June 2001 – 3 July 2002
- Prime Minister: Silvio Berlusconi
- Preceded by: Enzo Bianco
- Succeeded by: Giuseppe Pisanu

Member of the Chamber of Deputies
- In office 9 May 1996 – 14 March 2013
- Constituency: Liguria

Personal details
- Born: 15 January 1948 (age 78) Imperia, Italy
- Party: DC (1970s–1994); FI (1994–2009); PdL (2009–2013); FI (2013–2018)
- Education: University of Genoa

Claudio Scajola (Italian pronunciation: [ˈklaudjo skaˈjɔːla]; born 15 January 1948) is an Italian politician who is the mayor of Imperia since 2018 and the president of the province of Imperia since 2021.

== Career ==
Scajola was born in Imperia. A long-time member of Christian Democracy, he was mayor of Imperia during a short period in the 1980s and from 1990 to 1995, as his father and his brother had been. When Christian Democracy disbanded, he joined Forza Italia in 1995. He was then elected deputy in 1996 and was national coordinator of the party from 1996 to 2001 and again in 2003. He also led a faction named after him, the Scajoliani. He was the Italian Minister of the Interior from 2001 to 2002 and later the Italian Minister of Productive Activities in the third cabinet of Silvio Berlusconi. In this capacity, Scajola was a strong advocate for the Italian re-entry into commercial use of nuclear power for the generation of electricity.

Scajola has been nicknamed "SkyOla" because allegedly has been using Alitalia airplanes for private use. An air route was created from Leonardo da Vinci-Fiumicino Airport to Villanova d'Albenga International Airport, which he uses regularly for traveling from and to his parliamentary job; it is rarely used by other passengers. This scandal was exposed in 2008 by the RAI television program AnnoZero.

In April 2010, Italian newspapers wrote that Scajola, back in July 2004, had used €1,100,000 in slush funds to buy a flat in Rome near the Colosseum. At least €900,000 of those funds where reportedly traced as coming from Diego Anemone, a real estate developer under accusation of public servants bribing. During a press conference, he defended himself saying that the house had been paid without his knowledge. These justifications were not deemed sufficient by public opinion and Scajola resigned from office in May 2010.

At the 2018 Italian local elections, Scajola was elected mayor of Imperia, 23 years after his last mayoral experience.

== Arrest ==
On 8 May 2014, Scajola was arrested for aiding the escape of Amedeo Matacena, a former member of the Italian Parliament who was convicted of criminal involvement with the Calabrian 'Ndrangheta, and remained in police custody.

== Notable statements ==
In June 2002, Scajola told journalists in Cyprus that "Marco Biagi was only a jerk, only thinking about the renewal of his contract". Biagi was killed by terrorists in March 2002 and Scajola was the Italian Minister of the Interior. Scajola had to resign because of this sentence on 4 July 2002. Despite this, Berlusconi continued to support him.

Italian Chamber of Deputies
Preceded by Title jointly held	Deputy; 1996–2013; Legislatures: XIII, XIV, XV, XVI	Succeeded by Title jointly held
Political offices
Preceded by Enzo Bianco	Minister of the Interior; 2001–2002	Succeeded by Giuseppe Pisanu
Preceded by Giuseppe Pisanu	Minister for the Implementation of the Government Program; 2003–2005	Succeeded by Stefano Caldoro
Preceded by Antonio Marzano	Minister of Productive Activities; 2005–2006	Succeeded by Pier Luigi Bersani as Minister of Economic Development
Preceded by Enzo Bianco	President of COPACO; 2006–2008	Succeeded by Francesco Rutelli
Preceded by Pier Luigi Bersani	Minister of Economic Development; 2008–2010	Succeeded by Paolo Romani
Party political offices
Preceded by Cesare Previti	National Coordinator of Forza Italia; 1996–2001	Succeeded by Roberto Antonione
Preceded by Roberto Antonione	National Coordinator of Forza Italia; 2003	Succeeded by Sandro Bondi
