= Vittorio Mangano =

Member of the Sicilian Mafia (1940–2000)

- Vittorio Mangano, Secondigliano Penitentiary
- Born: Vittorio Mangano; 18 August 1940; Palermo, Italy
- Died: 23 July 2000 (aged 59); Palermo, Italy
- Other name: The Stable Keeper of Arcore (lo stalliere di Arcore)
- Occupation: Mafioso
- Spouse: Anna Maria Imbrociano
- Children: 3
- Status: Deceased (imprisoned from 2000)
- Allegiance: Porta Nuova Mafia family / Sicilian Mafia
- Convictions: Racketeering, extortion, fraud, money laundering, corruption, murder, robbery, drug trafficking
- Criminal charges: Racketeering, extortion, fraud, money laundering, corruption, murder, robbery, drug trafficking
- Penalty: Life imprisonment

Vittorio Mangano (18 August 1940 – 23 July 2000) was a member of the Sicilian Mafia. He was well known as the stable keeper at the villa of Silvio Berlusconi in Arcore in the 1970s, and is known as "The Stable Keeper of Arcore" (lo stalliere di Arcore). Berlusconi later became Prime Minister of Italy.

== Revelations during Maxi Trial in Palermo ==
During the Maxi Trial in the mid-1980s, the Mafia turncoats (pentiti) Tommaso Buscetta and Salvatore Contorno said that Mangano was a uomo d'onore (man of honour) of Cosa Nostra and a member of the Porta Nuova family that was headed by Giuseppe Calò. Buscetta himself was a member of this family.

== Hired to work in Arcore at Berlusconi's villa ==
From 1973 to 1975, Mangano was hired as a stable keeper at the Villa San Martino owned by Silvio Berlusconi in Arcore, a small town near Milan. Mangano's real job is alleged to have been to deter kidnappers from targeting the tycoon's children. It was Berlusconi's right-hand man Marcello Dell'Utri who advised to take Mangano for the job. Mangano took care of the villa's security and sometimes took Berlusconi's children to school.

According to pentito Antonino Giuffrè, Mangano served as a go-between for the Mafia boss Stefano Bontade. He said: "When Vittorio Mangano got the job in the Arcore villa, boss Stefano Bontade and some of his close aides used to meet Berlusconi using visits to Mangano as an excuse." Giuffrè told the Palermo court that despite Berlusconi's assertions to the contrary, Mangano's Mafia identity was known when he was hired at the villa.

=== Mangano's criminal record ===
Berlusconi kept Mangano as an employee despite his criminal record dating back to the 1960s. He never dismissed him even when, during his time as an employee in the Villa, he was imprisoned because of convictions and suspected of arranging the kidnapping of a friend of Berlusconi. Mangano left spontaneously in late 1975, concerned about Berlusconi's reputation when many newspapers started making a scandal about his stay at Arcore. Berlusconi later stated that he was absolutely unaware of who Mangano really was when he hired him.

Public prosecutor Paolo Borsellino named Mangano in his last interview on 19 May 1992 with the reporters Jean Pierre Moscardo and Fabrizio Calvi. Borsellino spoke about the relations and connections of the Mafia with business and politics. According to Borsellino, Mangano was the link between the Sicilian Mafia and its interests in Northern Italy. Borsellino was killed two months after this interview by a car bomb in Via D'Amelio.

The pentito Salvatore Cancemi disclosed that Berlusconi's company Fininvest, through Dell'Utri and Mangano, had paid Cosa Nostra ₤200 million (€100,000) annually. According to Cancemi, the alleged contacts led to legislation favourable to Cosa Nostra, particularly the harsh article 41-bis prison regime. The underlying premise was that Cosa Nostra would support Berlusconi's Forza Italia party in return for political favours.

=== Murder of Giuseppe Pecoraro and Giovambattista Romano ===
Mangano was sentenced to life imprisonment on 19 July 2000 for the murder of Giuseppe Pecoraro and Giovambattista Romano in January 1995. Moreover, he was suspected to be responsible for the kidnapping of Luigi D'Angerio after a dinner in the Berlusconi's villa on 7 December 1974.

==== Death in prison ====
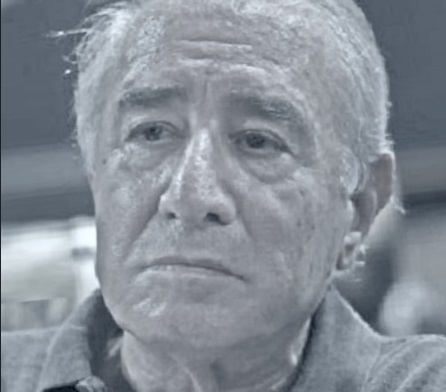
Dell'Utri, who described Mangano as a great man

Mangano died a few days after the verdict on 23 July 2000 in jail. He had been imprisoned five years before because of other crimes, such as drug trade and extortion. He died of a cancer. The epigraph of his tombstone reads: "He refused to barter his dignity for freedom" (Rifiutò di barattare la sua dignità con la libertà).

During an interview on 8 April 2008, Dell'Utri described Mangano as a great man who went to prison because he refused to say false things against Berlusconi. During a show on television channel La7 the following day, Berlusconi supported that declaration by saying that "Marcello Dell'Utri is right: Mangano was a hero because he never said anything about me".

=== Arrest of Cinzia Mangano ===
On 24 September 2013, Mangano's daughter and son-in-law, Cinzia Mangano and Enrico Di Grusa, were arrested by Italian police forces during a round-up within a Mafia probe into money laundering.

== See also ==
- Organized crime
- Organized crime in Italy
- Gaspare Spatuzza

== Bibliography ==
- Travaglio, Marco; Veltri, Elio (2001). L'odore dei soldi. Origini e misteri delle fortune di Silvio Berlusconi (in Italian). Rome: Editori Riuniti ISBN 88-359-5007-4.
