= Amedeo Matacena =

Italian politician (1963–2022)

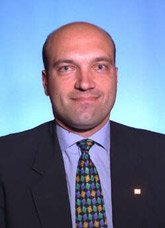

Member of the Chamber of Deputies
- In office 15 April 1994 – 29 June 2001
- Constituency: Calabria (Reggio Calabria–Villa San Giovanni)

Personal details
- Born: Amedeo Gennaro Raniero Matacena; 5 September 1963 Catania, Italy
- Died: 16 September 2022 (aged 59) Dubai, United Arab Emirates
- Party: Forza Italia
- Spouse(s): Chiara Rizzo; Maria Pia Tropepi
- Children: 2
- Occupation: Entrepreneur, politician

Amedeo Matacena
- Status: Fugitive (never served his sentence, died in 2022)
- Convictions: External complicity in mafia association (in Italian: concorso esterno in associazione mafiosa), ex Art. 416 § 1, 4, and 6 c.p
- Criminal charges: External complicity in mafia association (in Italian: concorso esterno in associazione mafiosa), ex Art. 416 § 1, 4, and 6 c.p
- Penalty: Five years' imprisonment (2012); Three years' imprisonment (2014)

Amedeo Matacena (15 September 1963 – 16 September 2022) was an Italian politician. Born in Catania, Sicily, into a family of shipowners with Calabrian ancestry, he was the owner of a maritime company, among the others family companies he inherited from his father.

Active in politics since the 1980s with the Italian Liberal Party, Matacena served as a Forza Italia member of the Chamber of Deputies from 1994 to 2001; he was elected through the constituency of Reggio Calabria, the city he became most associated with, and was known as "The King of the Strait".

During his life and career, Matacena underwent several trials and investigations, which ended his political career. His conviction for external complicity in mafia association was confirmed by Italy's Supreme Court of Cassation in 2013. Since then, Matacena had been a fugitive, and lived in Dubai until his death.

== Early life and family ==
Matacena was born in Catania. He was the son of the shipowner of the same name, who was known for having started ferrying in the Strait of Messina with the Caronte company in the 1960s, and later in the 1970s for having been president of Reggina, and who died in August 2003, and of Raffaella De Carolis, the 1962 Miss Italy, who died in June 2022.

Matacena obtained a liceo scientifico diploma and did not go to university. An entrepreneur, he was the owner of the maritime transport company Amadeus spa. Since the death of his father, Matacena presided over the family companies and carried out other entrepreneurial activities supported by the assets inherited from his father, consisting of €50 million.

Matacena was engaged to the television announcer Alessandra Canale, with whom he had a son. After a first marriage to Chiara Rizzo, with whom he had another son, Matacena later remarried to the former model and surgeon Maria Pia Tropepi, who was pregnant with two twins in 2022.

== Political career ==
Matacena began his political career in the 1980s with the Italian Liberal Party. He was first elected a municipal councilor of Scilla, Calabria, in 1988, then was elected for the municipality of Reggio Calabria in 1989, and became a regional councilor in 1990. From 1994 to 2001, Matacena was a member of the Chamber of Deputies for Forza Italia, the political party founded and led by Silvio Berlusconi.

In the 1994 Italian general election, which led to the establishment of the first Berlusconi government, Matacena was elected a deputy in the constituency of Villa San Giovanni within the Pole of Good Government electoral list, and as part of the Union of the Centre, the successor of the Italian Liberal Party who had joined with the centre-right coalition and later merged with Forza Italia. Matacena himself became a member of Forza Italia two years later.

In 1995, Matacena was one of three deputies who voted against the law that established the Article 41-bis, a hard prison regime for the bosses of Cosa Nostra, 'Ndrangheta, and Camorra. Confirmed as a member of the Forza Italia party's list and successfully re-elected in the 1996 Italian general election, he was a member of the Defence Commission until 2001. In the 2001 Italian general election, he was not renominated by Forza Italia for re-election. Since then, he ceased all national and local political activity.

== Later life and death ==
During his life, Matacena was associated with the cities of Reggio Calabria, where he was known as the "King of the Strait", and Rome, where his family lived, and Monte Carlo, where he resided alongside his family, before his move to Dubai. A fugitive, Matacena lived in Dubai, in the United Arab Emirates, since August 2013. He rejected the label of fugitive and defined himself as a refugee.

Matacena died in Dubai from a heart attack on 16 September 2022, the day after his 59th birthday. After the news of his death was rumoured that afternoon in Reggio Calabria, Matacena's death was confirmed by his lawyers. Matacena had been admitted to a hospital in the days preceding his death because he was experiencing gallbladder problems. After a few days of hospitalization, he was discharged and returned to his home in the centre of Dubai. In the late morning on 22 September, he had begun to feel painful pangs in his chest, and died while he was in the ambulance, shortly before he arrived at the hospital emergency room. The Reggio Calabria Prosecutor's Office asked Italy's Ministry of Justice to investigate the death of Matacena, including that of his mother, which it considered to be suspicious. After Matacena's death, a dispute arose between his two sons, Athos and Amedeo, who had asked for the body to be returned to Italy for the celebration of the funeral and burial, refusing to authorize the cremation, and his wife, according to whom the will of Matacena, in the event of his death (both in Italy and abroad), included the request to be cremated.

Matacena was remembered by former Reggio Calabria senator Renato Meduri, Reggio Calabria lawyer Luigi Tuccio, and Brothers of Italy member Filippo Marra. For his supporters, Matacena was a victim of judicial persecuation and miscarriage of justice, criticizing his mafia-related conviction after having been previously acquitted three times by two mixed courts. In 2014, Matacena's lawyers had proposed an extraordinary appeal to the European Court of Human Rights, (Note: According to the Italian law, which has three degrees of judgment and follows the "presumption of innocence" principle, a defendant is "not guilty" until the sentence "becomes final". A defendant has the right to all three levels of judgment (Court, Court of Appeal, and Supreme Court of Cassation) and to advance, in any level, a request for a constitutional complaint. They also have the right to go to supranational courts, such as the Court of Justice of the European Union and the European Court of Human Rights, to stand up for their reasons. See "Presunzione di non colpevolezza". Treccani (in Italian). 2013.) arguing that "the proceedings that led to the final sentence of Amedeo Matacena to five years of imprisonment present numerous violations of the rights recognized by the European Convention on Human Rights and by the additional protocols signed by Italy."

== Legal issues ==
=== External complicity in mafia association ===
In the early 1990s, Matacena was involved in the Olimpia maxi investigation, when the District Anti-Mafia Directorate of Reggio Calabria reconstructed some events of a criminal nature, including around a hundred murders, as well as the relationships between the 'Ndrangheta and politics, starting from the early 1980s. On 14 July 1995, Matacena was summoned by the Public Prosecutor of Catanzaro as part of an investigation that accused him of having contributed, supported, and facilitated the complex and multiple activities and criminal purposes of the 'Ndrangheta, a mafia association present in the Calabrian and national territory. Among the charges were that Matacena had offered and delivered a sum of money to a local affiliate of Scilla during the 1988 Italian local elections, requested and obtained electoral consensus from members of numerous gangs in favour of a candidate for the Chamber of Deputies in 1992, and used the intimidating force of the gangs of the Gioia Tauro plain. The Public Prosecutor's Office of Catanzaro requested a precautionary detention order for Matacena; the investigating judge of Catanzaro, citing a lack of conditions of the "serious indications of guilt", did not accept the request. The investigation was then transferred to the Prosecutor's Office of Reggio Calabria. In March 1998, Matacena was interrogated, and the Reggio Calabria Prosecutor's Office requested his indictment.

On 14 July 1998, the preliminary hearing judge of Reggio Calabria ordered the trial of Matacena, with the first hearing scheduled for 16 November 1998 before the Court of Assizes of Reggio Calabria. In that hearing, the Court of Assizes of Reggio Calabria declared Matacena, who was absent due to parliamentary commitments, in absentia. The trial concluded on 13 March 2001 with a sentence in absentia of 5 years and 4 months, with perpetual disqualification from holding public office, against Matacena, who was also sentenced to compensation for damages in favour of the civil parties and the municipality and province of Reggio Calabria. Matacena appealed to the sentence. In December 2003, the Court of Assizes of Appeal of Reggio Calabria annulled the first instance conviction and the entire first degree judgment, observing that the declaration of default issued in the judgment before the Court of Assizes of Reggio Calabria was illegitimate, as was ascertained by the Constitutional Court of Italy. The trial returned to the Court of Assizes of Reggio Calabria for a new judgement.

Lasting over two years from 2003 to March 2006, the new trial saw the participation of 15 collaborators of justice and over 100 witnesses, including the hearing of the then Chamber of Deputies president Pierferdinando Casini and numerous parliamentarians. In his testimony, Matacena told the judges that he was not involved in the facts, explaining that both he and his father were protected for several years by the Carabinieri as they were considered at risk of kidnapping. On 16 March 2006, the Court of Assizes of Reggio Calabria acquitted Matacena of the crime ascribed to him "because the fact does not exist". In their 200-pages motivating sentence, the judges explained the reasons for the overturning of the first degree sentence. In particular, regarding some contacts, which were mostly mediated, between Matacena and some criminals (who at the time of the facts were not under investigation for mafia crimes) during the 1994 Italian general election, there would have been no evidence of the crime of external competition in the mafia association because no help had been demonstrated, and there was no evidence of any commitment made by Matacena in favour of the gangs. In May 2009, the Fifth Criminal Section of the Supreme Court of Cassation ordered the transmission of the documents to the Court of Assizes of Appeal of Reggio Calabria for the second degree judgment, which according to the legal team of Matacena came "after a brief investigation limited only to the hearing of the witness Munaò Umberto (in relation to an extortion request that would not have been followed up)" with the sentence of 11 May 2010 that confirmed its acquittal.

In September 2010, after the Assize Court of Appeal of Reggio Calabria had acquitted Matacena, the state advocate general Francesco Scuderi appealed to Italy's Supreme Court of Cassation, so that "the 'seriousness and concreteness' of the commitments allegedly undertaken by the accused towards the criminal association 'Rosmini gang' was once again ascertained and evaluated." Accepting the appeal, the Supreme Court of Cassation ordered the referral to another panel. Matacena was accused of having requested the electoral support of the 'Ndrangheta from the Rosmini family; this was supported by the friendly interactions he had with the children of the Sinopoli boss Carmine Alvaro, who was known as "u cupertuni". On 18 July 2012, the Assize Court of Appeal of Reggio Calabria sentenced Matacena to five years in prison for the crime of external complicity in a mafia association. The sentence of 12 July 2012 was confirmed by the fifth criminal section of the Supreme Court of Cassation on 16 August 2013. In justifying their decision, the judges of the Supreme Court of Cassation argued that "evidently one cannot enter into an 'agreement' with a mafia structure without having full awareness of its existence and its modus operandi." On 21 June 2014, the First Criminal Section of the Supreme Court of Cassation ruled on the extraordinary appeal presented by Matacena's lawyers, re-determining the sentence imposed the previous year and reducing it from five to three years of imprisonment, accepting only the part of the appeal relating to the fact that the crime had been committed when the expected punishment had not yet been modified and made more severe. Former minister of economic development Claudio Scajola, a personal friend of Matacena since 1994, was also involved in the Matacena case, and was arrested by the Anti-Mafia Directorate of Reggio Calabria on charges of wanting to help Matacena, by then a convicted fugitive, to escape to Lebanon after his conviction, which also precluded him from holding any political offices.

=== Other proceedings ===
As part of an investigation into pressure exerted on some magistrates of the District Prosecutor's Office of Reggio Calabria, a precautionary detention order was issued on 9 November 2004 against Matacena and those of former deputy Paolo Romeo. The pressure was aimed at influencing the investigations that were taking place into collusions between political circles and the mafia Reggio Calabria. The investigation was conducted by the District Prosecutor's Office of Catanzaro and the request for the issuing of precautionary custody orders was signed by the Catanzaro prosecutor Mariano Lombardi and the deputy prosecutors Mario Spagnuolo and Luigi de Magistris. After a few days, the Court of Review of Catanzaro ordered his release from prison and the Supreme Court of Cassation confirmed the outcome in favour of Matacena in the trial. The preliminary hearing judge, with a sentence that had already become final, acquitted Matachena because he was not involved in the facts charged against him.

On 9 October 2012, as part of the Mozart trial, Matacena was sentenced by Olga Tarzia, Filippo Aragona, and Barbara Bennato, the judges of the Collegiate Court of Reggio Calabria, in the first instance trial to 4 years of imprisonment. The trial arose from an investigation into a corruption case; Matacena had allegedly promised €200,000 to Luigi Passanisi, the former president of the Reggio Calabria section of the Regional Administrative Court Luigi who was also sentenced by the Collegiate Court of Reggio Calabria to three years and six months of imprisonment, to win an appeal before the Regional Administrative Court and obtain authorizations for the boarding ramps at the port of Reggio Calabria for his company. On 31 March 2015, the conviction of Matacena in the Mozart trial was upheld by the second instance trial. On 5 November 2016, the Sixth Criminal Section of the Supreme Court of Cassation extinguished the conviction against Matacena related to the Mozart case due to the statute of limitations.

=== Fugitive and arrest in Dubai ===
On 28 August 2013, after about a month on the run that started after his June 2013 conviction, Matacena was arrested in Dubai, where he arrived from the Seychelles, by the Interpol and the arrest section of the investigative unit of the Carabinieri of Reggio Calabria. He was released by the authorities of the United Arab Emirates in October 2013, with a ban on leaving the country, and thus the extradition was denied. On 8 May 2014, Scajola was arrested by the Anti-Mafia Investigation Division of Reggio Calabria on charges of having favoured Matacena's fugitive status and of wanting to plan his transfer to Lebanon. The precautionary custody order in prison was also issued for his factotum Martino Politi; under a house arrest order were placed for his mother Raffaella De Carolis, his secretary Maria Grazia Fiordalisi, Scajola's secretary Roberta Sacco, and for Rizzo, Matacena's wife. Rizzo, who was unavailable at the time of the execution of the restrictive measure against her, was arrested in Nice on 11 May 2014; On 24 January 2020, Scajola and Rizzo were respectively sentenced to two and one years in the first instance trial; Scajola's sentence was suspended and the aggravating circumstance of having favoured the mafia was excluded, while one of Rizzo's charges was extinguished due to the statute of limitations. In motivating the sentence, the judges wrote that "an interest in helping Matacena to obtain political asylum in Lebanon emerged following a request from his wife Chiara Rizzo", and that Scajola's conduct "did not end in lawful aid to the fugitive" due to the existence of "undoubted and consolidated" relationships.

From Dubai, Matacena denied having attempted to move to Lebanon, stating that he was working as a maître d'hôtel in the United Arab Emirates, where there is no extradition. Although an extradition agreement was signed between the two countries in September 2015, Matacena was still at large in Dubai as of 2016; he would have been free by June 2023, when the statute of limitations would have extinguished his mafia-related conviction. In 2019, the Italian government reiterated its extradition request to the United Arab Emirates; this was not successful, and the several attempts of the Italian government and its Ministry of Justice to have Matacena extradited led to suspicions that he had received significant external help from someone who would not have wanted his return to Italy. Matacena had said in 2014 that he would return to Italy if his wife was released from jail but this did not materialize. Had he willingly chosen to collaborate with the justice system, Matacena could have revealed the connections between the 'Ndrangheta, Cosa Nostra, and other Italian mafias, with the criminal systems and with the invisible mafia, a term that refer to those deviant parts of Freemasonry, the Italian secret services, and high finance. As of 2022, the 'Ndrangheta held a predominant position compared to other criminal organizations due to its wealth (calculated to be around €100 billion per year) deriving from cocaine trafficking, and thus was identified as a true "parallel state", a sort of "super-association", as defined in a reconstruction contained in an information from the District Anti-Mafia Directorate of Reggio Calabria that ended up in the documents of the Breakfast trial also involving Matacena, where the 'Ndrangheta was ranked "on a par with other components of a gargantuan and deviant political-economic system".

=== Revocation of arrest warrant and seizure of assets ===
In August 2022, despite the "judgment of circumstantial gravity considered confirmed" and the opposition of the District Anti-Mafia Directorate, the Reggio Calabria judge for preliminary investigations ordered the revocation of the arrest warrant and the decree of seizure of the assets. The motivation for the revocations was that the lawful origin had been ascertained of the company assets seized from Matacena and the subject of the fictitious registrations contested in the Breakfast investigation, which involved the Matacena family, and saw him accused of fictitious registration with the mafia aggravating circumstance, given the long time that has passed since the date of commission of the contested crimes, and the exclusion in the precautionary phase of the aggravating mafia crime. Prior to his death a month later, Matacena was supposed to return to Reggio Calabria after the revocations.

== See also ==
- Marcello Dell'Utri
- Salvatore Cuffaro
