= Marcello Dell'Utri =

Italian politician (born 1941)

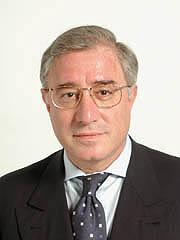
- Dell'Utri in 2008

Member of the Senate of the Republic
- In office 30 May 2001 – 19 January 2013
- Constituency: Lombardy

Member of the European Parliament for Italian Islands
- In office 14 June 1999 – 10 June 2004

Member of the Chamber of Deputies
- In office 9 May 1996 – 29 May 2001
- Constituency: Lombardy 3

Personal details
- Born: 11 September 1941 (age 85) Palermo, Italy
- Party: FI (1994–2009); PdL (2009–2013)
- Height: 1.65 m (5 ft 5 in)
- Spouse: Miranda Ratti (m. 1970)
- Children: Marco; Margherita
- Education: University of Milan
- Occupation: Manager, former politician
- Nickname(s): Marcellino; Il bibliofilo

Marcello Dell'Utri
- Status: Imprisoned (2014–2019), free since 3 December 2019
- Convictions: Complicity with the Mafia (in Italian: concorso esterno in associazione mafiosa), ex Art. 416 § 1, 4, and 6 c.p
- Criminal charges: Complicity with the Mafia (in Italian: concorso esterno in associazione mafiosa), ex Art. 416 § 1, 4, and 6
- Penalty: Seven years' imprisonment (2014)

Marcello Dell'Utri (born 11 September 1941) is a former Italian politician best known for being a senior advisor to former prime minister Silvio Berlusconi. Born in Palermo, he became Berlusconi's secretary in his early 20s and since the 1970s he worked for him at his many companies, including Publitalia '80 and Fininvest Rai. Dell'Utri's life and career have been marred by controversies and legal issues, including a conviction for external complicity in mafia association.

Formerly a member of the Italian Parliament from 1996 to 2013 and of the European Parliament from 1999 to 2004, Dell'Utri was found guilty of tax fraud, false accounting, and complicity in conspiracy with the Sicilian Mafia, also known as Cosa Nostra; the conviction for the last charge was upheld on 9 May 2014 by the Supreme Court of Cassation, the highest judicial court in Italy, which sentenced Dell'Utri to seven years in prison. The conviction is final and cannot be further appealed; it also ruled that Dell'Utri was the mediator between Berlusconi and Cosa Nostra.

In 1974, Dell'Utri introduced Vittorio Mangano, already charged for Mafia crimes, to Berlusconi at the Villa San Martino owned by Berlusconi in Arcore, a small town near Milan. Dell'Utri and Berlusconi denied that they knew of Mangano's links to the Mafia and claimed that he was employed as a gardener and stable keeper to deter kidnappers from targeting Berlusconi's children. Dell'Utri's Mafia conviction sentence stated that Mangano was employed precisely due to his Mafia past.

The Third Criminal Section of Palermo's Appellate Court declared Dell'Utri a fugitive in May 2014, when it was discovered he had fled the country ahead of the final court decision. After being detained in Lebanon, Dell'Utri was extradited to Italy on 13 June 2014. In Italy, he served 4 years of imprisonment and 1 year of house arrest. He was further sentenced in April 2018 to 12 years due to the State-Mafia Pact. This conviction was overturned on appeal in September 2021 for not having committed the facts. In July 2023, he inherited €30 million from Berlusconi's will.

== Early life and education ==
Dell'Utri was born in Palermo in 1941. After obtaining his liceo classico high-school diploma in his native city, he went to Milan to study law at university in 1961. It was during his student years at the University of Milan that he met Silvio Berlusconi. In 1964, at the age of 23, he worked as secretary for Berlusconi, who with his Edilnord company sponsored Torrescalla, a small student category football team linked to the Rui Foundation, of which Dell'Utri was coach.

== Relations with Silvio Berlusconi ==
In 1965, Dell'Utri moved to Rome, where for a couple of years he directed the ELIS Sports Group in the Tiburtino-Casal Bruciato district at the International Centre for Working Youth, an apostolic initiative of the Catholic Church that the Pope entrusted to Opus Dei. In 1967, he returned to Palermo at the Athletic Club Bacigalupo; during this experience, as admitted by Dell'Utri himself, he met Vittorio Mangano and Antonino Cinà, two mafiosi belonging to Cosa Nostra. In 1970, he worked for the Savings Bank of the Sicilian Provinces in Catania. In 1971, he was transferred to the Belmonte Mezzagno branch. In 1973, he was promoted to the general management of Sicilcassa in Palermo, an agricultural credit service. By that same year, he was also back in Milan, where he began to work for Silvio Berlusconi's building firm Edilnord at the request of Berlusconi, for whom he also acted as secretary; in particular, he followed the renovation work on the villa in Arcore after Berlusconi purchased it from the marquis Annamaria Casati Stampa, of whom Cesare Previti was among the legal guardians.

Later in the 1970s, Dell'Utri went to work at Bresciano Costruzioni. In 1980, he was called by Berlusconi and worked for Publitalia '80, the advertising sales wing of Fininvest's television division, first as a manager and later as the company's chairman and chief executive. On 29 June 1993, alongside Berlusconi, Previti, and the likes of Gianfranco Ciaurro, Antonio Martino, Antonio Tajani, Giuliano Urbani, and Mario Valducci Dell'Utri was one of the founders of Forza Italia! Association for Good Governance. In 1994, Dell'Utri was one of the founders of Forza Italia, together with Berlusconi, Previti, Tajani, and others; Forza Italia was a big-tent centre-right party, with liberal conservative (the right-wing of the Italian Liberal Party), Christian democratic (the right-wing of Christian Democracy), and social-democratic (the right-wing of the Italian Socialist Party) factions, whose aim was to collect all the votes of the disbanded Pentapartito, the governing centrist coalition that was dissolved after the Tangentopoli scandal, or in the words of Berlusconi, "not yet another party or faction born to divide, but a force born with the opposite objective". In 1990, Silvio Berlusconi Editore was founded at the proposal of Dell'Utri, who personally followed its production until 1993.

In 1995, Dell'Utri left Publitalia '80, the advertising company owned by Berlusconi. He was elected to Italy's Chamber of Deputies (the lower house of the Italian Parliament) in 1996. In 1999, he was elected to the European Parliament, of which he stayed member until 2004. Dell'Utri was elected as a member of the Senate of the Republic in 2001, and was re-elected in 2006 and 2008, taking several parliamentary roles. In March 2013, the Appellate Court of Palermo recognized Dell'Utri as a mediator between Berlusconi and Cosa Nostra; he was also deemed by the Supreme Court of Cassation in 2014 as socially dangerous, decisive in Berlusconi's pact with the Mafia, and as having empowered Cosa Nostra; in the words of the final sentence, Dell'Utri's role was of "significant importance for both parties: the Mafia association, which drew a constant channel of significant enrichment; [and] the entrepreneur Berlusconi, interested in preserving his sphere of personal security and economical". In May 2014, Berlusconi's former lawyer Vittorio Dotti stated that Dell'Utri and Fedele Confalonieri were Berlusconi's only true friends. When Berlusconi died in June 2023, Dell'Utri was one of the beneficiaries of Berlusconi's estate by will, from whom he inherited €30 million as a legacy. Between 2021 and 2023, he also received from Berlusconi €900,000 through payments with ten transfers of €90,000 each. In an interview to La Stampa in July 2023 about Berlusconi's will, Dell'Utri stated that Berlusconi "did not buy [his] silence" and that they were "a gesture of affection". Dell'Utri further said: "When I heard about the legacy, I started to cry. In 60 years of friendship, we have given each other everything; it would be vulgar to reduce it to an economic calculation."

== Collusion with the Mafia ==
Mugshot of La Cosa Nostra member Vittorio Mangano. From 1973 to 1975, Mangano was hired as stable keeper at the Villa San Martino owned by Berlusconi in Arcore. During an interview on 8 April 2008, Dell'Utri described Mangano as a "hero".

On 7 July 1974, Dell'Utri brought Vittorio Mangano to Silvio Berlusconi's villa in Arcore who, according to the Court of Palermo, was hired by Berlusconi as "responsible" to prevent the entrepreneur's family members from being victims of kidnapping and not as a groom as was stated. A young mafioso who later became a leading exponent of the Porta Nuova clan in Palermo, Mangano was arrested 3 times, some of which ended up with convictions. Numerous other unsubstiated complaints were made against Mangano and was already considered a "dangerous person" by authorities since 1967. After Mangano's final arrest, both Dell'Utri and Berlusconi declared to the police that they had not been aware of his criminal activities. The Court of Palermo's sentence stated that Dell'Utri knew Mangano's "criminal depth"; referring to the hidden task of personal protection of Berlusconi and his family following explicit death threats received by them if he did not follow up on the Mafia's requests, the Court of Palermo ruled that he had chosen him precisely for this quality. On 24 October 1976, Dell'Utri was together with Mangano and other mafiosi at the birthday party of the Catania boss Antonino Calderone held at the Le Colline Pistoiesi restaurant in Milan.

In 1977, having been made redundant by Edilnord, Dell'Utri was contacted by Filippo Alberto Rapisarda, who had relationships with prominent Mafia figures, such as Vito Ciancimino, Francesco Paolo Alamia, and the Cuntrera-Caruana Mafia clan. Dell'Utri was hired by Rapisarda due to their mutual knowledge since childhood at his construction company; the employment relationship with INIM ended when he was fired on the grounds that he had diverted funds from the company's coffers. In a 1981 Criminalpol report, INISM was defined, together with its sister company RACA, as "a commercial company managed by the Mafia which the Mafia uses to launder dirty money derived from illicit crimes". Dell'Utri then took on the role of managing director of Bresciano Costruzioni, which also ended up in bankruptcy after a few years. Dell'Utri was indicted for fraudulent bankruptcy, although he was at large and once again without a job, while Rapisarda fled as a fugitive to Venezuela, using a passport registered in the name of Dell'Utri's brother. On 19 April 1980, he was in London, where he attended the wedding of Girolamo Maria Fauci, more commonly called Jimmy Fauci, a Mafia boss who managed international drug trafficking between Italy, Great Britain, and Canada.

In 1982, Dell'Utri began his activity in Publitalia '80, the Fininvest advertising collection company founded in 1979 by Berlusconi, from whom he received the appointment of director. In 1983, as part of a blitz of arrests carried out in Milan against the casino mafia, he was found in the residence of the Catania mafia boss Gaetano Corallo. Despite this, he requested and obtained the appointment as managing director of the Fininvest group in 1984. In early 1992, Vincenzo Garraffa, a former senator from the Italian Republican Party and president of Trapani's basketball team, received a visit from the Trapani boss Vincenzo Virga, then a fugitive and murder convict who later went in prison. Virga, who came to collect an alleged illegal loan claimed by Dell'Utri, said that "Dell'Utri sent me. The episode, reported by Garraffa, was ascertained by the Court of Milan, which in May 2004 sentenced Dell'Utri and Virga to two years for attempted extortion in first degree. In 2007, the sentence was confirmed on appeal. Dell'Utri was acquitted by the Supreme Court of Cassation on the grounds that the president of Trapani's basketball team also knew the Virga boss and did not perceive him as a Mafia threat. The sentence stated that Dell'Utri had "mobilized [two] mafiosi of the caliber of Virga and Buffa" to "convince" the Garraffa "to respect the commitment", a refund of money as part of a sponsorship, and he was acquitted because there was not enough evidence that the visit of the two to Garaffa was "capable of instilling fear".

In 1996, the Mafia pentito (justice collaborator) Salvatore Cancemi declared that both Dell'Utri and Berlusconi were in direct contact with Mafia boss Salvatore Riina. According to Cancemi, the alleged contacts were to lead to legislation favourable to Cosa Nostra, in particular the harsh Article 41-bis prison regime. The underlying premise was that Cosa Nostra would support Berlusconi's Forza Italia party in return for political favours. After a two-year investigation, magistrates closed the inquiry without charges. They did not find evidence to corroborate Cancemi's allegations. Similarly, a two-year investigation, also launched on evidence from Cancemi, into Berlusconi's alleged association with the Mafia was closed in 1996. Cancemi disclosed that Fininvest, through Dell'Utri and Mangano, had paid Cosa Nostra ₤200 million (€100,000) annually. According to Antonino Giuffrè, a justice collaborator who was arrested on 16 April 2002, the Mafia turned to Berlusconi's Forza Italia party to look after the Mafia's interests after the decline in the early 1990s of the ruling Christian Democracy party, whose leaders in Sicily looked after the Mafia's interests in Rome. The Mafia's fall out with Christian Democracy became clear when Salvatore Lima, their strong man in Sicily, was killed in March 1992. Giuffrè told the court: "The Lima murder marked the end of an era. A new era opened with a new political force on the horizon which provided the guarantees that the Christian Democrats were no longer able to deliver. To be clear, that party was Forza Italia." If true, the allegations might explain the Berlusconi coalition's clean sweep of Sicily's 61 parliamentary seats in the 2001 Italian general election. According to Giuffrè, Dell'Utri was the go-between on a range of legislative efforts to ease pressure on mafiosi in exchange for electoral support. He said that "Dell'Utri was very close to Cosa Nostra and a very good contact point for Berlusconi." Mafia boss Bernardo Provenzano told Giuffrè that they "were in good hands" with Dell'Utri, whom he described as a "serious and trustworthy person". Dell'Utri's lawyer Enrico Trantino dismissed Giuffrè's allegations as an "anthology of hearsay". He said Giuffrè had perpetuated the trend that every new turncoat would attack Dell'Utri and the former Christian Democracy prime minister Giulio Andreotti in order to earn money and judicial privileges.

== Political career ==
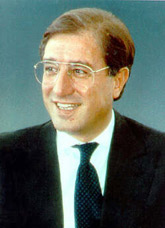
Dell'Utri in 1996, the year he was elected a deputy. In 2010, Dell'Utri stated that he entered politics to defend himself from his legal issues.

In 1993, together with Silvio Berlusconi and others, Dell'Utri founded Forza Italia! Association for Good Governance, and left the position of president of Publitalia '80. In 1995, he was arrested in Turin on charges of having contaminated the evidence in the investigation into the Publitalia '80 black funds. In the 1996 Italian general election, Dell'Utri was elected a deputy, a position he held until 2001. He was also a member of the European Parliament from 1999 to 2004, and was a member of the Senate of the Republic from 2001 to 2013. In January 1996, while he was charged in Turin for false invoices and tax fraud and under investigation in Palermo for Mafia association, Dell'Utri became a Forza Italia deputy in the Italian Parliament. As he later said in an interview, Dell'Utri chose a career in politics as a way to avoid prosecution, arguing that the judges were persecuting him. In the five years of activity in the Chamber of Deputies, he presented only two law degrees: a reform of the legislation on the dairy industry and changes on the protection of minor victims of abuse or violence. In 1999, he entered a plea bargain and agreed to a sentence of two years and three months in prison for the crimes of tax fraud and false invoices. In the 1999 European Parliament election in Italy, he was elected within the Forza Italia list. In the five years as a member of the European Parliament, he was a co-signatory of three proposed resolutions and nine parliamentary questions, of which in only one case he was the first signatory.

In 2001 Italian general election, Dell'Utri was elected a member of the Senate of the Republic in the first constituency of Milan. As a senator, among several other positions, he held the that of president of the Senate Library Commission. He was re-elected in the 2006 Italian general election. In 2007, he was the most absent senator, with 673 absences out of 1,637 (41.1%). For the 2008 Italian general election, he was re-nominated for the Senate of the Republic and was elected in Forza Italia's successor party, The People of Freedom, despite his conviction for Mafia association at the first-instance trial. In ten years of senatorial activity, he never presented a bill as the first signatory. He was member and later president of the Library and Historical Archive Commission, member of the 7th Permanent Commission (Public Education and Cultural Heritage), member of the 13th Permanent Commission (Territory, Environment, and Environmental Heritage), substitute member of the Italian Parliamentary Delegation to the Assembly of the Council of Europe, and substitute member of the Italian Parliamentary Delegation to the Assembly of the Western European Union. Dell'Utri also founded Biblioteca di via Senato, l'Erasmo. Trimestrale della civiltà europea, and Il Domenicale, and became president of the cultural association Il Circolo Giovani.

On 10 February 2010, Dell'Utri stated that he used politics to defend himself from his legal troubles. He also reiterated that he would not resign even following a conviction on appeal. He said: "I am a politician for self-defense. I don't care about politics. I defend myself with politics, I'm forced. I ran in 1996 to protect myself. In fact, immediately afterwards I received the arrest warrant ... I also defend myself outside [Parliament], but I'm not an idiot. They'll arrest me." On 19 January 2013, after the attorney general of Palermo requested seven years in prison for Dell'Utri, he declared his intention to withdraw from politics ahead of the then upcoming 2013 Italian general election; he said that although it was his decision, the call was made by Berlusconi. This was due the difficult negotiations with Berlusconi, took a hard line on the list of candidates, and the messages also sent to the press regarding his re-election, after the promise of clean lists made by the then People of Freedom secretary Angelino Alfano. If Dell'Utri were convicted of Mafia charges in Palermo, the parliamentary immunity would not prevent him from going to prison. On 9 July 2015, over a year since he had been jailed after his final conviction for Mafia association, Dell'Utri's annuity was revoked, together with nine other former deputies and eight former senators.

== Other activities ==
Dell'Utri is president of the Fondazione Biblioteca di via Senato and founder of the Circolo Dell'Utri, which is named after himself. In November 2005, the Circolo Dell'Utri was insolvent and subjected to an injunction for over €600,000 in unpaid bills. The facts were reported by the Neapolitan provincial newspaper Metropolis in relation to the costs of organizing a convention for the party's under 40s. Earlier in 2002, he had accessed public funds for publishing with Il Domenicale, of which he was editor until it closed its activities in 2009.

On 8 February 2007, the then Milan mayor Letizia Moratti appointed him director art of the Teatro Lirico. His appointment was criticized by the opposition and several councilors, as well as Vittorio Sgarbi, while Moratti defended him. On 10 September 2007, he joined the board of directors of E Polis, which at the time was the publisher of 15 free-press newspapers throughout Italy, including the Circolo Dell'Utri, and became president of the advertising agency Publiepolis spa. On 8 February 2008, he resigned from both positions. In February 2010, Dell'Utri declared that he had read a missing chapter of Petrolio, the last and unfinished novel by Pier Paolo Pasolini that was stolen after his death, announcing its exhibition at the 21st ancient book exhibition in Milan. The chapter was never presented at the exhibition.

== Legal issues ==
During his life and career, Dell'Utri underwent at least 12 proceedings. The investigations into Dell'Utri began in 1994, the year he entered politics, with the first revelations coming together in file 6031/94 of the Palermo Prosecutor's Office. Out of the 12 proceedings, Dell'Utri was acquitted four times at the Supreme Court of Cassation (attempted extortion, incitement to multi-aggravated slander, embezzlement, and the State-Mafia Pact); he was acquitted once for not proceeding due to an error by the Prosecutor's Office (tax fraud while he had been acquitted for bankruptcy); he once agreed to a plea bargain (false invoices and tax fraud); he received a definitive sentence of conviction twice (7 years of imprisonment for external complicity in a Mafia association, serving 4 years in prison and more than 1 year under house arrest, and 8 months for building abuse); he was once sent to trial but this was covered by the statute of limitations (the case related to the refoundation of Propaganda Due, or P2, through the P3); he was twice given a dismissal (corruption and receiving stolen goods); and still had a pending investigation for extortion of Berlusconi before the latter died in June 2023.

On 11 April 2014, the Appellate Court of Palermo declared Dell'Utri a fugitive. He had already been unavailable starting from the second half of March 2014 based on what was declared by the Anti-Mafia Investigation Directorate of Palermo, to which the notification of the precautionary custody order in prison issued against him had been delegated by the Third Criminal Section of the Appellate of Palermo. Once his fugitive status was established, an international arrest warrant was extended by the Italian police forces to Interpol. With the coordination of the services of the Anti-Mafia Investigative Directorate and through the cross-referencing of information relating to telephone records and the results of a credit card in his possession used for payments and consequently arrested inside a hotel in Beirut, Lebanon, Dell'Utri was located on Lebanese territory on 12 April 2014. The operation was conducted locally by the Lebanese intelligence who stopped Dell'Utri at interior of the Intercontinental Phenicia hotel. According to information released by the Anti-Mafia Investigative Directorate of Palermo, Dell'Utri had left Italy and remained untraceable "since the second half of March", and on 24 March 2014 had boarded a flight to Beirut in Lebanon in transit from France. At the time of his arrest, he was in possession of two passports, one of which was diplomatic (expired), and a suitcase full of cash for a total of €30,000 in small denomination banknotes.

Following the capture, the activation of the extradition procedure was ordered. On 9 May 2014, the Supreme Court of Cassation, after four hours of deliberation, definitively confirmed the appeal sentence that had sentenced Dell'Utri for Mafia association to 7 years in prison. Following the ruling of the Supreme Court of Cassation, the General Prosecutor's Office notified the imprisonment order in execution of the sentence for the crimes charged against Dell'Utri and completed the documentation sent to the Lebanese judicial authority for the purposes of extraditing him to Italy. On 24 May 2014, the then Lebanese president Michel Suleiman, on the last day of his mandate, signed the extradition to Italy for Dell'Utri. On 13 June 2014, he was extradited to Italy and sent to a Parma prison. Six months later, he enrolled in the History Faculty of the University of Bologna. After being moved to Rome in a Rebibbia prison in May 2016 and granted house arrests in July 2018, he returned a free man in December 2019. In his first words as a free man, Dell'Utri said: "I would like to send a warm greeting to all my fellow prisoners who remained inside." He did not mention Berlusconi and to the reporters who asked him if Vittorio Mangano, the Mafia groom who served for more than two years at the Arcore villa, was still his hero, he responded: "You are still talking about Mangano..." Encouraged by the reporters, he uttered a sentence against the Mafia, before leaving in the car, saying: "It sucks."

=== Conviction for Mafia collusion (2004) ===
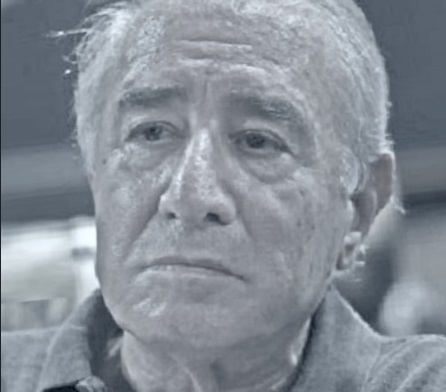
Dell'Utri during his trial for Mafia association. He was convicted and sentenced to 7 years in prison, plus a life ban from public office, ex Art. 416 § 1, 4, and 6 c.p.

In December 2004, after seven years and 256 hearings and the examination of 270 pentiti, witnesses, and consultants, Dell'Utri was convicted in the first-instance trial for complicity in conspiracy with the Mafia (Italian: concorso esterno in associazione mafiosa) and sentenced to 9 years. According to the motivation of the first-instance sentence, (Note: According to the Italian law, which has three degrees of judgment and follows the "presumption of innocence" principle, a defendant is "not guilty" until the sentence "becomes final". A defendant has the right to all three levels of judgment (Court, Court of Appeal, and Supreme Court of Cassation) and to advance, in any level, a request for a constitutional complaint. They also have the right to go to supranational courts, such as the Court of Justice of the European Union and the European Court of Human Rights, to stand up for their reasons. See "Presunzione di non colpevolezza". Treccani (in Italian). 2013.) Dell'Utri provided "a concrete, voluntary, conscious, specific and precious contribution to the illicit goals of Cosa Nostra, both economically and politically". The judges described him as a bridge enabling Cosa Nostra "to come in contact with important economic and financial circles". Dell'Utri described the judges' deposition as "an uncritical endorsement of the arguments of the prosecution ... 1,800 uselessly repetitive pages".

=== Conviction in appeal (2012) ===
Dell'Utri appealed the 2004 sentence, and the appeals trial began in 2006. The Appellate Court of Palermo sentenced Dell'Utri to seven years of detention for collusion with the Mafia for up to year 1992 having been acting as a liaison among Mafia bosses Salvatore Riina, Stefano Bontade, and Bernardo Provenzano, and being an intermediary between the criminal organizations in Sicily and Berlusconi. One of the incriminating circumstances being the employment of the mafia member Vittorio Mangano under the disguise of a stable keeper at Berlusconi's villa in Arcore. The appellate court ascertained that Dell'Utri was an intermediary and advisor to Bontade up to the year 1980 and later up to year 1992 to Riina and Provenzano for direct investments in Milan, Lombardy, and Northern Italy aimed at laundering illicit profits coming from mafia criminal activities and drug trafficking by means of financial operations in companies based in Northern Italy.

Dell'Utri appealed to the Supreme Court of Cassation. In May 2013, after the inconclusive 2013 Italian general election had led to the establishment of a grand coalition between the Democratic Party, The People of Freedom (Berlusconi's successor party, of which Dell'Utri was a member), and other minor parties, the centre-right coalition's senator Giacomo Caliendo proposed a law that would reduce the maximum possible jail sentence for the crime of external complicity in Mafia association, of which Dell'Utri had been convicted, from a maximum 12 years to five. The bill would have also removed the possibility of prison sentences being handed to those found guilty of aiding individuals involved in a Mafia association if no financial advantage was gained from this assistance, and the draft legislation would have further prevented prosecutors from wiretapping the conversations of people suspected of doing this. This attracted strong criticism from the centre-left coalition. The then Democratic Party deputy Laura Garavini commented: "It's a question of decency. The proposal simply aims to remove any possibility of uncovering who's helping the mafia from the outside." The then Democratic Party senator Nicola Latorre accused The People of Freedom of using the bill to create discord in the grand coalition led by Enrico Letta, a moderate member of the Democratic Party. Latorre stated: "The sense is that [The People of Freedom] is issuing proposals that they know will profoundly divide the two parties. I hope this isn't the case."

=== Supreme Court of Cassation conviction (2014) ===
The Supreme Court of Cassation definitively sentenced Dell'Utri to seven years in prison. The Third Criminal Section of the Appellate Court of Palermo declared Dell'Utri a fugitive when it was discovered he had left the country shortly ahead of the impending final sentence. At the moment the sentence was read in Italy, Dell'Utri was already being detained in Lebanon being swiftly captured in Beirut in a joint police operation led by Interpol and Lebanese police forces. Investigators tracked him down to a luxury hotel in Beirut, where he was arrested by police. The Supreme Court of Cassation convicted Dell'Utri of acting as a go-between for the Sicilian Mafia and the Milan business elite, including Berlusconi's companies, from 1974 to 1992.

=== Escape attempt, arrest, and extradition ===
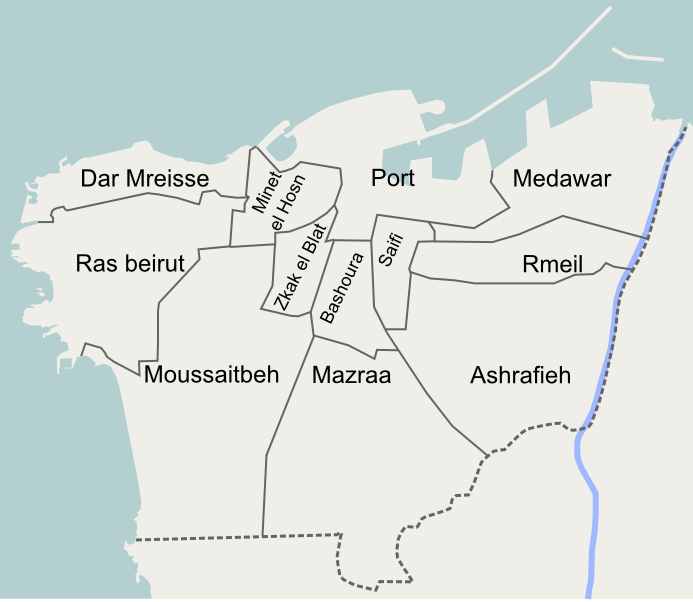
A map of Beirut, Lebanon. Dell'Utri was located and arrested there on 12 April 2014 by a joint operation led by Interpol and Lebanese forces.

On 11 April 2014, the Third Criminal Section of the Appellate Court of Palermo issued an arrest warrant for Dell'Utri at the request of the national anti-mafia investigation department, which said it had obtained information that he might flee ahead of his hearing at Italy's highest appellate court in Rome on 15 April 2014. Following the issue of a European Arrest Warrant and an international Red Notice by Interpol, Dell'Utri was located and arrested in Beirut, Lebanon, in a joint operation involving Lebanese intelligence and the Italian anti-mafia investigation department. Dell'Utri was traced down to the five-star Hotel Phoenicia through the use of his credit card and mobile phone records. Dell'Utri was alone at the moment of his arrest and was found in possession of a large amount of cash.

The procedure to extradite the detained Dell'Utri from Lebanon to Italy had been initiated by Italy's Ministry of Justice to the Lebanese authorities following his arrest in Lebanon on 12 April 2014. Dell'Utri remained detained in custody by Lebanese authorities until the completion of the extradition procedure. Throughout the entire procedure, the Lebanese prosecution office was in contact with the Italian authorities over the issue via the official diplomatic channels and the Interpol offices in Beirut. On 13 June 2014, Dell'Utri was extradited to Italy and booked into a prison in Parma, where he began serving his seven years sentence under a high-security regime. On 8 May 2016, his request for transfer to a prison in Rebibbia, Rome, was accepted. In July 2018, he was moved to house arrest in Milan due to health issues; he suffered from heart disease, a severe form of diabetes, and prostatic adenocarcinoma. On 3 December 2019, benefitting from an early release according to the law that reduced the 7 years sentence to 5 years and three months, the then 77-years-old Dell'Utri returned a free man, with two more years under special surveillance, to be subjected to a judicial decision if deemed to be socially dangerous.

=== Other proceedings ===
In 1999, the Supreme Court of Cassation sentenced Dell'Utri to 2 years and 3 months for tax fraud and false accounting. That same year, he was elected as a member of the European Parliament, and in 2001 was appointed a senator in Italy. The Italian legal system standing at the time allowed the statute of limitations to continue to run during the course of legal trial, thus nullifying the fact of the pending charge. A transcript of a tapped phone conversation became public in April 2006. The conversation was between the fugitive Vito Roberto Palazzolo, a notorious Mafia banker linked to Bernardo Provenzano, and his sister in Milan. Palazzolo, convicted in Switzerland for laundering drug money, absconded to South Africa in 1986. Italy was seeking his extradition from South Africa. In the tapped phone conversation, Palazzolo urged his sister to pressure Dell'Utri to disrupt the extradition attempts and offered to cut him in on construction deals in Angola. Implying that Dell'Utri was a link to the Mafia, Palazzolo said: "Don't worry, you don't have to convert him, he's already been converted." On 15 May 2007, the Appeal Court of Milan sentenced Dell'Utri and Mafia boss Vincenzo Virga to two years each for attempted extortion of Trapani Basket Ball team by Publitalia, the Fininvest concessionaire. On 20 May 2011, the Appeal Court in Milan nullified the sentence and acquitted Dell'Utri and Virga because there was no substance to the fact.

In October 2009, Gaspare Spatuzza, a mafioso turned pentito in 2008, confirmed Giuffrè's statements. Spatuzza testified that his boss Giuseppe Graviano had told him in 1994 that future prime minister Silvio Berlusconi was bargaining with the Mafia, concerning a political-electoral agreement between Cosa Nostra and Berlusconi's party Forza Italia. Spatuzza said Graviano disclosed the information to him during a conversation in a bar Graviano owned in the upscale via Veneto district of the Italian capital Rome. According to Spatuzza, Dell'Utri was the intermediary. Dell'Utri dismissed Spatuzza's allegations as "nonsense". Spatuzza's allegations were included in the prosecution of Dell'Utri's Mafia collusion appeal and Spatuzza repeated his allegations at the appeal trial. Prosecutors argued that the Mafia spread panic with a campaign of terrorist bombings in mainland Italy in 1993, such as the via dei Georgofili bombing, so that Forza Italia could step onto the political stage in the guise of national saviour. The bombings stopped after Berlusconi first won power in 1994.

On 29 June 2010, the Appellate Court of Palermo reduced the 2004 nine-year sentence for collusion with the Mafia to seven years. The judges took six days to consider their decision, an extraordinary long time for deliberations. In reviewing the previous sentence, the appeals court said that the conviction stood for acts committed by Dell'Utri prior to 1992, while he was acquitted for charges after that year. The prosecution had asked that the sentence be increased to 11 years. After the appeals court ruling, Dell'Utri expressed his admiration for the late Vittorio Mangano, a convicted mafioso who up to his death in prison denied that any link existed between Cosa Nostra and Dell'Utri and Berlusconi. Dell'Utri said: "He was a sick inmate who was asked to testify against me and Berlusconi and always refused to do so. If he had, anything he would have said would have been believed. But he preferred to stay in prison, and die there, rather than to make unjust accusations. He was my hero. I don't know if I could have resisted as much as he did."

On 31 October 2017, Dell'Utri was enrolled in the register of people involved in underground negotiations between corrupted representatives of the Italian government and the mafia organizations in sicily (State-Mafia Pact) upon request of the public prosecutor, having the prosecutor's office obtained new relevant informations coming from the transcripts of telephone conversation in Palermo by Graviano involving Dell'Utri together with other people implicated in the negotiations. On 20 April 2018, he was sentenced to a further 12 years in prison. On 23 September 2019, the Appellate Court of Palermo acquitted Dell'Utri of the charge for not having committed the facts ascribed to him. According to the sentence, issued after three days of deliberation, the State-Mafia Pact was real but was not a crime, and thus Dell'Utri and other defendants were acquitted; the Mafia bosses were convicted for extortion.

== Controversies ==
In addition to his Mafia-related conviction and proceedings, Dell'Utri attracted controversies for several claims and statements. In 2007, Dell'Utri claimed to have located a number of Mussolini diaries, which had been allegedly lost; these were later discovered to be forgeries. On 11 February 2007, Dell'Utri announced that he had received from the children of a deceased partisan (whose name he refused to reveal) five alleged diaries handwritten by Benito Mussolini, containing notes from 1935 to 1939. Some historians, such as Francesco Perfetti, initially showed themselves to be possibilists; others, such as Giovanni Sabbatucci, Valerio Castronovo, Emilio Gentile, Luciano Canfora, and Denis Mack Smith were sceptical. L'Espresso subsequently reported that a study had denied the authenticity of the diaries, which had already been exposed as fakes by The Times in 1980 and Sotheby's in the 1990s. After several months of studies conducted by Gentile and the Italian graphologists president Roberto Travaglini, macroscopic historical discrepancies and handwriting that cannot be traced back to Mussolini were found. Significant inconsistencies, anachronisms, and errors were found to characterize the content of Mussolini diaries and showed it to be forgeries. According to the scholar Mimmo Franzinelli, the person who kept the diaries was Aldo Pianta, a merchant from Domodossola and son of an Italian partisan.

A few days before the 2008 Italian general election, in an interview given to journalist Klaus Davi, he stated that Vittorio Mangano was "a hero, in his own way" because, according to him, while Mangano was in prison for multiple crimes (from 1995 to 2000, the year of his death), he would have refused to make statements against him and Berlusconi in exchange for release even in the last months of his life, when he was terminally ill with cancer. In the press conference held following his conviction for external complicity in a mafia association on 29 June 2010, Dell'Utri stated: "Mangano remains my hero: I don't know if, finding myself in his place in prison, I would be able to resist without naming names." Ezio Cartotto, who was Dell'Utri's collaborator, stated before the judges of Caltanissetta and Palermo: "Every now and then [Dell'Utri] would blurt out against Berlusconi, and once he told me 'Silvio doesn't understand that he has to thank me, because if I were to open my mouth I...'" These words were interpreted by some journalists, including Marco Travaglio, Daniele Luttazzi, and Carlo Freccero, who were acquitted from the charges of forgery and slander for what they stated during the 2001 interview with Travaglio at Satyricon, as a sort of threat towards Berlusconi to urge him to find legislative solutions before the Supreme Court of Cassation ruling. Over the years, Dell'Utri attracted controversies over his statements about the Italian Resistance and Fascist Italy, which had been criticized as showing sympathy for Italian fascism and Mussolini. In April 2008, Dell'Utri stated his intention to start the revision of history books he claimed were "conditioned by the rhetoric of the Resistance". In May 2009, he argued: "Mussolini lost the war because he was too good. He was not at all a ruthless and bloodthirsty dictator like Stalin."

== See also ==
- Tommaso Buscetta
- Giuseppe Calò
- Salvatore Contorno
- Salvatore Cuffaro
- Amedeo Matacena

== Notes ==
Italian Senate
Preceded by Title jointly held	Member of the Senate of the Republic; Legislatures; XIV, XV, XVI; 2001–2013	Succeeded by Title jointly held
Italian Chamber of Deputies
Preceded by Title jointly held	Member of the Chamber of Deputies; Legislatures; XIII; 1996–2001	Succeeded by Title jointly held
