= Christoph Deutschmann =

German sociologist

Christoph Deutschmann (born 1946 in Stuttgart) is a German sociologist and Professor of Sociology at the University of Tübingen, where he has been Professor Emeritus since 2010.

Deutschmann studied sociology as his major, with economics and political science as minors, at Goethe University Frankfurt, where he graduated with a Diplom degree in 1973 and earned his doctorate in 1975. From 1976 to 1984, he worked as a research assistant at the Institute for Social Research, the institutional home of the Frankfurt School and Critical Theory. From 1984 to 1986, he spent as a research fellow at Tohoku University in Sendai in a project on working hours in Japan. In 1986, he joined the Science Center for Social Research (Wissenschaftszentrum Berlin für Sozialforschung, WZB) in West Berlin, where he worked as a researcher for three years. In 1987, he completed his habilitation in Sociology at Goethe University in Frankfurt. Since 1989, he has been professor of Sociology in Tübingen and a member of the Research Institute for Work, Technology and Culture (Forschungsinstitut für Arbeit, Technik und Kultur, F.A.T.K.) in Tübingen.

His research focuses on Economic Sociology, Industrial Relations and Social Theory. A central theme of his work is the role of money in capitalist development and economic growth. He conceptualizes money as a new, secularized religion of modern society. To address and overcome capitalism's imperative for continuous economic growth, he advocates reforms of private property rights.
