= Emilio Gentile =

Italian historian and professor (born 1946)

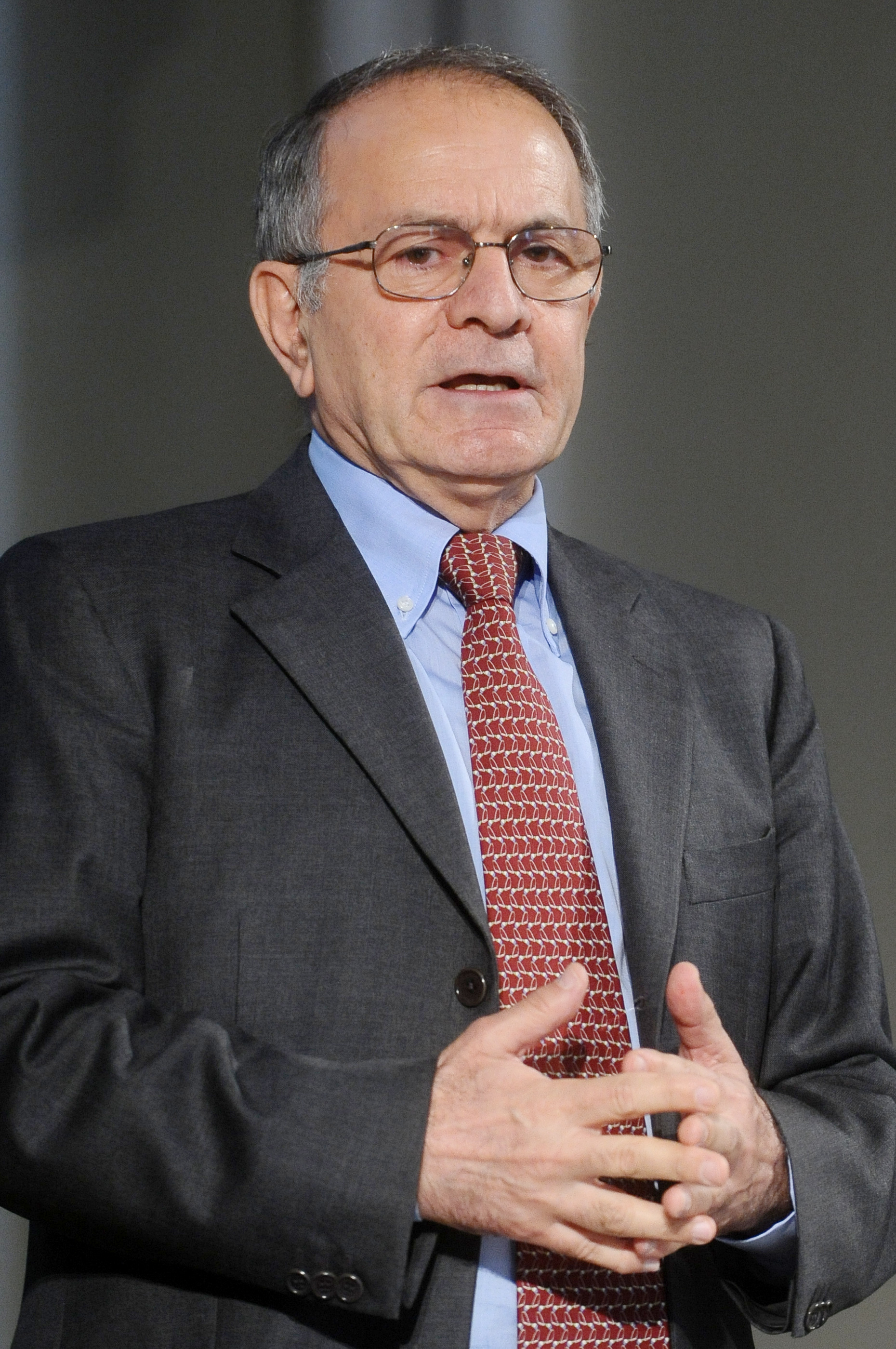
Gentile in 2014

Emilio Gentile (born 1946) is an Italian historian and professor, specializing in the history, ideology, and culture of Italian fascism. Born in Bojano, Gentile is considered one of Italy's foremost cultural historians of Fascist Italy and its ideology. He studied under the renowned Italian historian Renzo De Felice and wrote a book about him.

Gentile serves as Professor of History at the Sapienza University of Rome. He considers fascism a form of political religion. He also applied the theory of political religion to the United States in the essay Politics as Religion (2006) regarding the sacralization of politics in the aftermath of the September 11 attacks. In 2003, Gentile was awarded the Hans Sigrist Prize.

== Works ==
- Storia del partito fascista. 1919-1922. Movimento e milizia. 1989
- Il culto del littorio. La sacralizzazione della politica nell'Italia fascista. Rome/Bari. 1993
  - English translation: The Sacralization of Politics in Fascist Italy, 1996, Harvard University Press, hup.harvard.edu
- Le religioni della politica. Fra democrazie e totalitarismi. Laterza, Rome 2001
  - English translation: Politics as Religion. Princeton University Press. 2006.
- Fascismo. Storia e interpretazione. Rome/Bari. 2002
- Il mito dello Stato nuovo. Dal radicalismo nazionale al fascismo. 2002
- Le origini dell'Italia contemporanea. L'età giolittiana. 2003
- Renzo De Felice. Lo storico e il personaggio. 2003
- Il fascismo in tre capitoli. 2006
- La Grande Italia. Il mito della nazione nel XX secolo. 2006
  - English translation: La Grande Italia: The Myth of the Nation in the Twentieth Century. University of Wisconsin Press. 2009.
- La democrazia di Dio. La religione americana nell'era dell'impero e del terrore, Roma-Bari, Laterza, 2006. ISBN 88-420-8051-9.
  - English translation: God's Democracy: American Religion After September 11. Greenwood Press. 2008.
- Il fascino del persecutore. George Mosse e i totalitarismi. Carocci. 2007
- L'apocalisse della modernità. La grande guerra per l'uomo nuovo. Mondadori. 2008
- Contro Cesare. Cristianesimo e totalitarismo nell'epoca dei fascismi, Milano, Feltrinelli, 2010. ISBN 978-88-07-11107-5.
- Né stato né nazione. Italiani senza meta, Roma-Bari, Laterza, 2010. ISBN 978-88-420-9321-3.
- Italiani senza padri. Intervista sul Risorgimento, Roma-Bari, Laterza, 2011. ISBN 978-88-420-9499-9.
- E fu subito regime. Il fascismo e la marcia su Roma, Roma-Bari, Laterza, 2012. ISBN 978-88-420-9577-4.
