= Iraq–Italy relations =

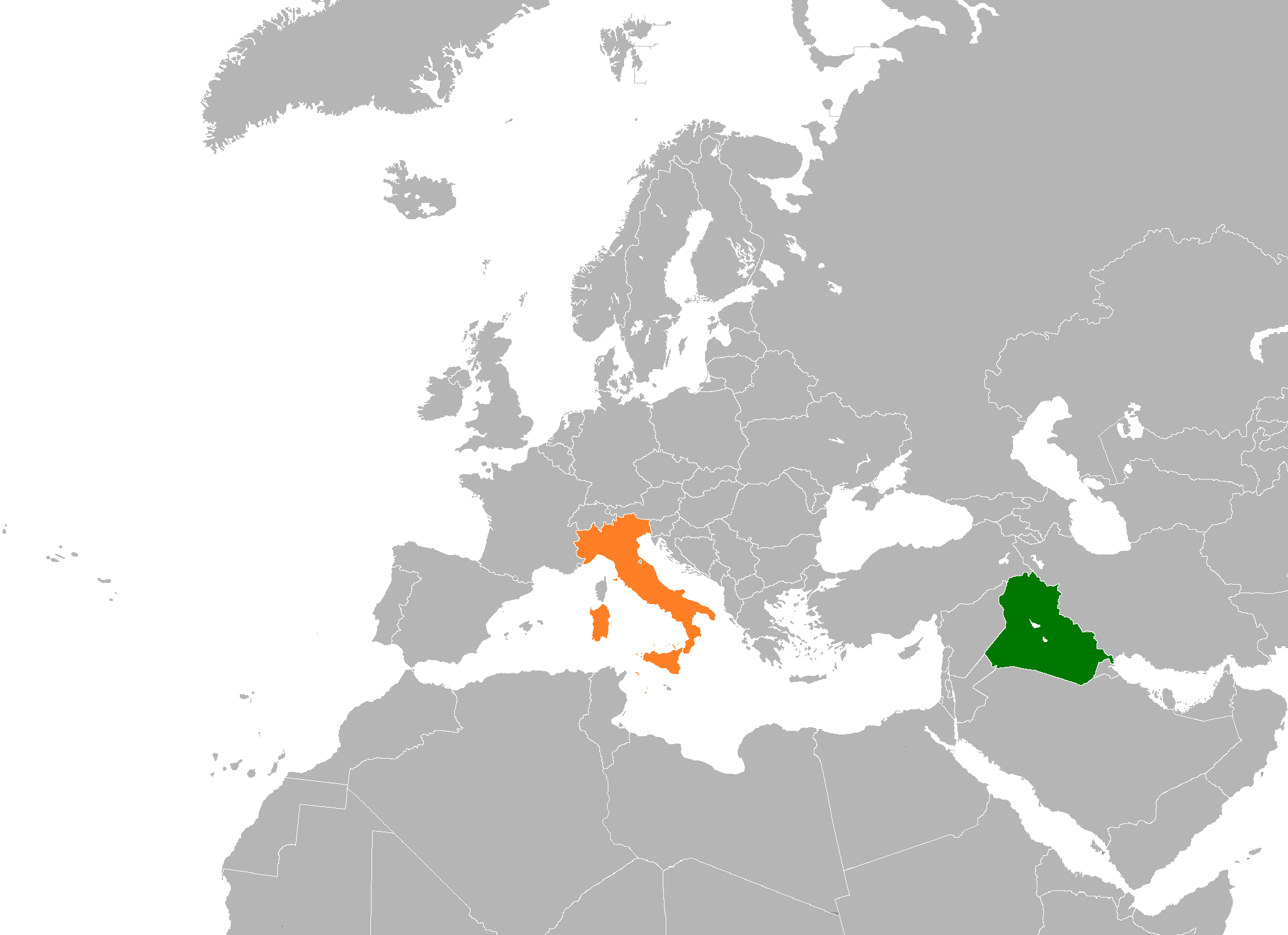
- Iraq: Italy

Iraq–Italy relations are the interstate ties relations between Iraq and Italy. Iraq has an embassy in Rome and Italy had an embassy in Baghdad and a consulate-general in Erbil.

== History ==
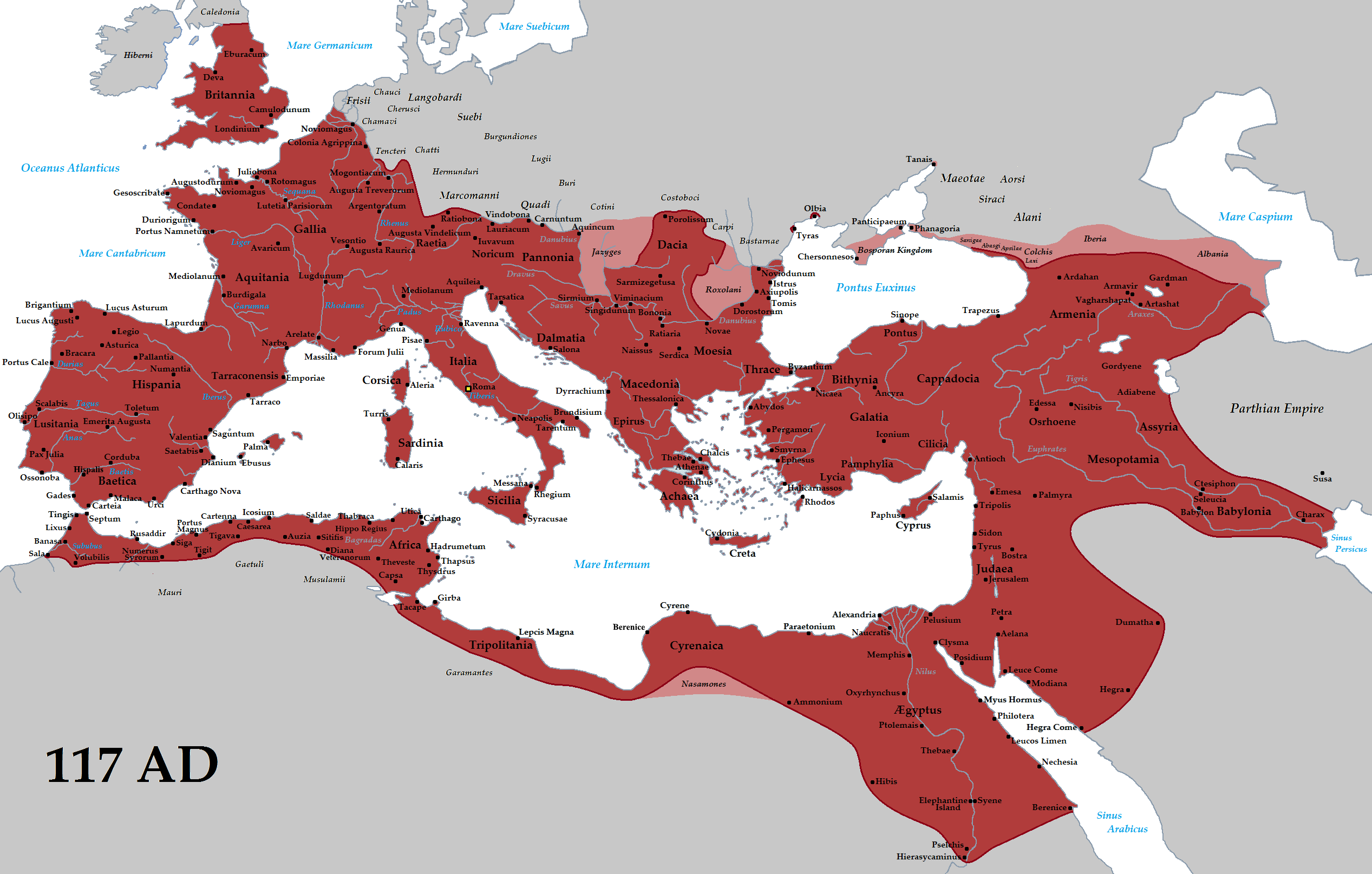
Large areas of Arabia came under the Roman Empire

=== From Iraq's independence (1932) to the Ba'ath revolution (1968) ===
In June 1940, when Fascist Italy joined the second world war, on the side of Germany, the British-siding Iraqi government did not break off diplomatic relations, as they had done with Germany. Thus the Italian Legation in Baghdad became the chief centre for Axis propaganda and for fomenting anti-British feeling. In this they were aided by Mohammad Amin al-Husayni, the Grand Mufti of Jerusalem. The Grand Mufti had fled from Palestine shortly before the outbreak of war and later received asylum in Baghdad.

Following the 1941 Iraqi coup d'état, the immediate plans of Iraq's new leaders were to refuse further concessions to the United Kingdom, to retain diplomatic links with Fascist Italy, and to expel most prominent pro-British politicians from the country.

In the aftermath of the Anglo-Iraqi War, Rashid Ali and the Mufti of Jerusalem fled to Persia, then to Turkey, then to Italy, and finally to Berlin, Germany, where Ali was welcomed by Hitler as head of the Iraqi government-in-exile. In propaganda broadcasts from Berlin, the Mufti continued to call on Arabs to rise up against the British and aid German and Italian forces. He also helped recruit Muslim volunteers in the Balkans for the Waffen SS.

=== Iran–Iraq war ===
Relations between the two strengthened when Italy sent economic and naval assistance to Saddam Hussein in the Iran–Iraq War in the 1980s.

Italy provided substantial supplies to Iraq during the Iran–Iraq War. Its greatest impact, however, was financial, with the U.S. branch of the state-owned, largest bank, Banca Nazionale del Lavoro (BNL) in Italy providing several billion dollars in funding for Iraqi military procurement. Italy also was a primary supplier to the Iraqi nuclear program, although that was not of direct effect on the Iran–Iraq War.

With respect to conventional military supplies, Italy provided land and sea mines to both Iraq and Iran. Iraq had ordered naval vessels and helicopters from Italy, although the ships were seized under the embargo.

In 1990 Roberto Formigoni garnered attention when he was involved in a mission to Iraq which successfully concluded with the freeing of some Italian technicians who were held hostages of the local government.

=== The 1991 Gulf War ===
Italy, along with other European and non-aligned states, supported the January 1991 French proposal of a UN resolution calling for "a rapid and massive withdrawal" from Kuwait along with a statement to Iraq that Council members would bring their "active contribution" to a settlement of other problems of the region, "in particular, of the Arab-Israeli conflict and in particular to the Palestinian problem by convening, at an appropriate moment, an international conference" to assure "the security, stability and development of this region of the world.". The U.S. and Britain rejected it (along with the Soviet Union, irrelevantly).

Italy then joined the multinational coalition for Operation Desert Shield and Operation Desert Storm.

=== Saddam Hussein's last period (1991–2003) ===
Iraq and Italy agreed to enhance parliamentary relations during a meeting in mid-2000, between acting Iraqi National Assembly (parliament) Speaker Hamid Rashid Al-Rawee and a visiting Italian parliamentary delegation. Al-Rawee reviewed Iraq's relations with Italy and expressed hope of expanding them in all fields, the official Iraqi News Agency reported. Rocco Buttiglione, head of the Italian delegation, confirmed the necessity to promote parliamentary relations with Iraq, and expressed solidarity with the Iraqi people in confronting the decade-old U.N. sanctions.

Roberto Formigoni was later involved in the Oil-for-food scandal, when he bought 1,000,000 oil barrels (160,000 m3).

=== The involvement of Italy in the 2003 invasion of Iraq ===
In January 2003, activists of the Italian Radical Party tried to broker an agreement (Free Iraq campaign) that would lead to the exile of Saddam Hussein and to a peaceful transition in Iraq, thus stopping the invasion. The Italian Parliament had mandated the government, who had accepted, to pursue the Free Iraq aim, as an alternative to war. The move was stopped by US and UK governments' unwillingness to achieve it, although Italy had secured Saddam's acceptance through contacts with Muammar al-Gaddafi. The Radicals later strongly opposed the execution of Saddam Hussein and of Tariq Aziz.

The Berlusconi government then totally backed the United States in their attempt to obtain a UN mandate for the 2003 invasion of Iraq. In February 2003, US Secretary of State Colin Powell addressed the United Nations General Assembly, continuing US efforts to gain UN authorization for an invasion. Powell presented evidence alleging that Iraq was actively producing chemical and biological weapons and had ties to al-Qaeda. As a follow-up to Powell's presentation, the United States, United Kingdom, Poland, Italy, Australia, Denmark, Japan, and Spain proposed a resolution authorizing the use of force in Iraq, but NATO members like Canada, France, and Germany, together with Russia, strongly urged continued diplomacy. Facing a losing vote as well as a likely veto from France and Russia, the US, UK, Spain, Poland, Denmark, Italy, Japan, and Australia eventually withdrew their resolution.

In March 2003, the United States, United Kingdom, Spain, Australia, Poland, Denmark, and Italy began preparing for the invasion of Iraq, with a host of public relations and military moves. In his March 17, 2003 address to the nation, Bush demanded that Hussein and his two sons, Uday and Qusay, surrender and leave Iraq, giving them a 48-hour deadline. But the US began the bombing of Iraq on the day before the deadline expired. On March 18, 2003, the bombing of Iraq by the United States, the United Kingdom, Spain, Poland, Australia, and Denmark began. Unlike the first Gulf War or the war in Afghanistan (2001–2021), this war had no explicit UN authorisation.

Due to the 2003 Iraq war many historical artifacts have either been stolen or damaged; however, over 40 ivory pieces were restored in Rome, in the workshops of the Istituto Centrale per il Restauro (Central Institute for Restoration). Baghdad's Iraqi National Museum owns the greatest collection of Assyrian ivories in the world. Over the last fifteen years, this collection, both the pieces held in the vaults of the Iraqi Central Bank and those still held in the Museum, has suffered as a result both of the war and of poor conservation conditions. Some of the most precious objects were restored by the Istituto Centrale per il Restauro team in 2004, immediately after the installation of a new restoration workshop provided by the Italian Ministry of Culture.

The 2003 Nasiriyah bombing was a suicide attack on the Italian military police headquarters in Nasiriyah, Iraq, south of Baghdad on November 12, 2003. At least 28 people were killed, including 17 Italian carabinieri, two Italian civilians, and nine Iraqi civilians. More than 100 people were injured, including 19 Italian soldiers. The attack was the worst incident involving Italian soldiers since Operation Restore Hope in Somalia and the highest loss of Italian soldiers since World War II.

The Rescue of Giuliana Sgrena was a covert operation by the Italian military secret service, SISMI, to rescue Italian journalist Giuliana Sgrena from kidnappers in Iraq. After the successful retrieval of Ms Sgrena, on March 4, 2005, the car with her and two secret agents came under friendly fire by US Army troops along the Baghdad airport road; secret agent Nicola Calipari was killed by US Army Specialist Mario Lozano. The incident created tension between the two countries, and arguably increased public hostility in the Italian public towards the United States of America.

Italian troops pulled out of Iraq in 2006, following the establishment of the Prodi government in Italy.

== Iraqi diaspora in Italy ==
The current population of Iraqis in Italy stands at around 17,300; however one source claims there to be 56,300, which is approximately 50 families. Most of these are priests, nuns and seminarians who have come to pursue their studies in Italy. The majority are residents of Rome.

== Resident diplomatic missions ==
- Iraq has an embassy in Rome.
- Italy has an embassy in Baghdad.

== See also ==
- Foreign relations of Iraq
- Foreign relations of Italy
- Anglo-Iraqi War
- Italian support for Iraq during the Iran–Iraq war
- Iraq–EU relations
