= Franco Frattini =

Italian politician (1957–2022)

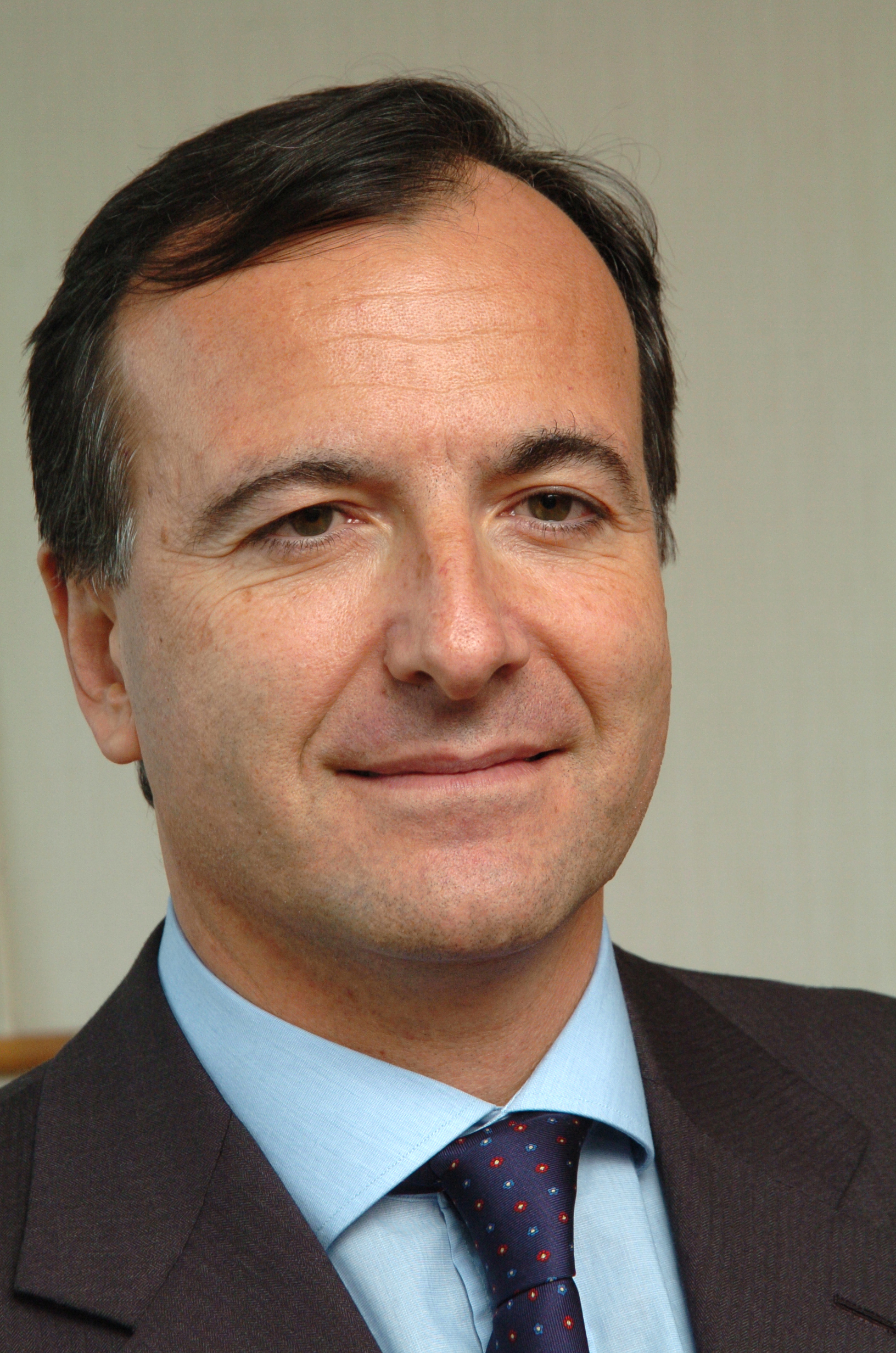
- Frattini in 2001

President of the Council of State
- In office 28 January 2022 – 24 December 2022
- Preceded by: Filippo Patroni Griffi
- Succeeded by: Luigi Maruotti

Minister of Foreign Affairs
- In office 8 May 2008 – 16 November 2011
- Prime Minister: Silvio Berlusconi
- Preceded by: Massimo D'Alema
- Succeeded by: Giulio Terzi di Sant'Agata
- In office 14 November 2002 – 18 November 2004
- Prime Minister: Silvio Berlusconi
- Preceded by: Silvio Berlusconi (Acting)
- Succeeded by: Gianfranco Fini

European Commissioner for Justice, Freedom and Security
- In office 22 November 2004 – 8 May 2008
- President: José Manuel Barroso
- Preceded by: António Vitorino
- Succeeded by: Jacques Barrot

Minister of Public Function
- In office 11 June 2001 – 14 November 2002
- Prime Minister: Silvio Berlusconi
- Preceded by: Franco Bassanini
- Succeeded by: Luigi Mazzella
- In office 17 January 1995 – 22 March 1996
- Prime Minister: Lamberto Dini
- Preceded by: Giuliano Urbani
- Succeeded by: Giovanni Motzo

Member of the Chamber of Deputies
- In office 29 April 2008 – 14 March 2013
- Constituency: Friuli-Venezia Giulia
- In office 9 May 1996 – 22 November 2004
- Constituency: Bolzano (1996–2001); Veneto (2001–2004)

Personal details
- Born: 14 March 1957 Rome, Italy
- Died: 24 December 2022 (aged 65) Rome, Italy
- Party: PSI (before 1994); Forza Italia (1996–2009); PdL (2009–2012); Independent (2012–2022)
- Height: 1.78 m (5 ft 10 in)
- Spouse: Stella Coppi (m. 2010)
- Children: 1
- Education: Sapienza University
- Occupation: Magistrate, politician

Franco Frattini (14 March 1957 – 24 December 2022) was an Italian politician and magistrate. He served as the President of the Council of State from January to December 2022.

Frattini previously served as Minister of Foreign Affairs from 2002 to 2004 and from 2008 to 2011 in the governments of Silvio Berlusconi as well as Minister of Public Function from 1995 to 1996 and from 2001 to 2002, in the government of Lamberto Dini and Silvio Berlusconi. From 2004 to 2008, he was also the European Commissioner for Justice, Freedom and Security in the first Barroso Commission.

== Education and career ==
Frattini was born in Rome in 1957. He attended the "Giulio Cesare" Classical High School in Rome and graduated in law in 1979 at the Sapienza University.

From 1984 he was State Attorney and magistrate of the Regional Administrative Court (TAR) in Piedmont. In 1986, Frattini was named member of the Italian Council of State and legal adviser of the Treasury Ministry. During these years, he served as secretary of the Federation of Young Italian Socialists (FGSI) and member of the Italian Socialist Party (PSI).

In 1990 and 1991, he worked as a legal adviser to the deputy secretary of the PSI, Claudio Martelli, in the Andreotti VI Cabinet.

== Early political career ==
In 1994, Frattini was appointed Secretary General to the Presidency of the Council of Ministers during the first government of Silvio Berlusconi. However, in January 1995, the government lost its majority in the parliament and Lamberto Dini, an independent technocrat who was serving as Minister of Treasury, became the new Prime Minister. Frattini was appointed Minister for Public Function.

In 1996, he joined Berlusconi's Forza Italia (FI) and was candidated in the upcoming election within the Pole for Freedoms, the electoral coalition between FI, National Alliance and other minor conservative parties. He was elected in the northern constituency of Bolzano–Laives. However, the centre-left coalition of Romano Prodi won the election and from 1996 to 2001, Frattini served as chairman of the parliamentary committee for the supervision of intelligence (COPACO). Moreover, from November 1997 until August 2000 he was also a City Councillor in Rome.

== Minister in Berlusconi's cabinets (2001–2004) ==
=== Minister of Public Function ===
In 2001, Frattini was a candidate for the Chamber of Deputies in the constituency of Bolzano, supported by House of Freedom. From 2001, he took part in the Berlusconi II Cabinet as Minister for Public Administration. The so-called Frattini Act, namely Law no. 215/2004, on "Rules on conflicts of interest", approved by Parliament on 13 July 2004, received criticism from the Council of Europe's Venice Commission on its compatibility with international standards on freedom of expression and pluralism of the media.

=== Minister of Foreign Affairs ===
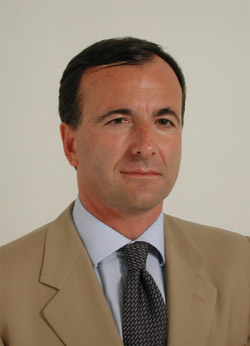
Franco Frattini in 2001

From 14 November 2002 to 18 November 2004, Frattini served as Italian Minister of Foreign Affairs: the appointment of Frattini followed ten months of interim by Berlusconi himself, after the resignation of the former minister Renato Ruggiero due to his contrasts with the foreign policies of the government.

During his ministerial tenure, Italy supported the invasion of Iraq by the United States led by president George W. Bush; Frattini called it a "legitimate intervention" even in the absence of a United Nations mandate. Frattini authorized the overflight and the use of Italian military bases by the Anglo-American coalition. Frattini later sent an Italian military and police contingent to Iraq, in what he called a "humanitarian emergency intervention," of about 3,200 men. This force made Italy the 3rd largest participant in the Coalition of the willing after the United States and the United Kingdom.

Italian forces took part in Operation Ancient Babylon which began in July 2003 together with British forces in the southern Dhi Qar province, centered in the town of Nassiriya; the Italian Barbara Contini was charged with civilian administration by the Coalition Provisional Administration. A suicide attack there killed 19 Italians, among military and civilians.

During the Italian military presence in the south of Iraq, eight Italians were kidnapped, of whom two were later murdered: the mercenary Fabrizio Quattrocchi and the journalist Enzo Baldoni, in addition to the SISMI agent Nicola Calipari, killed by U.S. soldiers during the liberation of kidnapped journalist Giuliana Sgrena. It remains unclear whether Italy offered a ransom for the release of the other six hostages. The killing of Quattrocchi was reported live on the late night Italian television program Porta a Porta, at the time of which Frattini was a guest in the studio, which raised criticism of Frattini for the lack of tact in not informing the victim's family in advance. Frattini was later also criticized for saying Quattrocchi "died bravely, I would say as a hero".

In 2004, Frattini had to leave office at the Ministry of Foreign Affairs, which passed to Gianfranco Fini following a government reshuffle. Italy's participation in the post-war occupation of Iraq remained unpopular within the Italian public opinion. At the beginning of 2006, the Berlusconi III government announced its intention to withdraw the Italian contingent from Iraq by the end of the year, a decision confirmed by the new government of Romano Prodi that succeeded it.

== Vice President of the European Commission and European Commissioner (2004–2008) ==
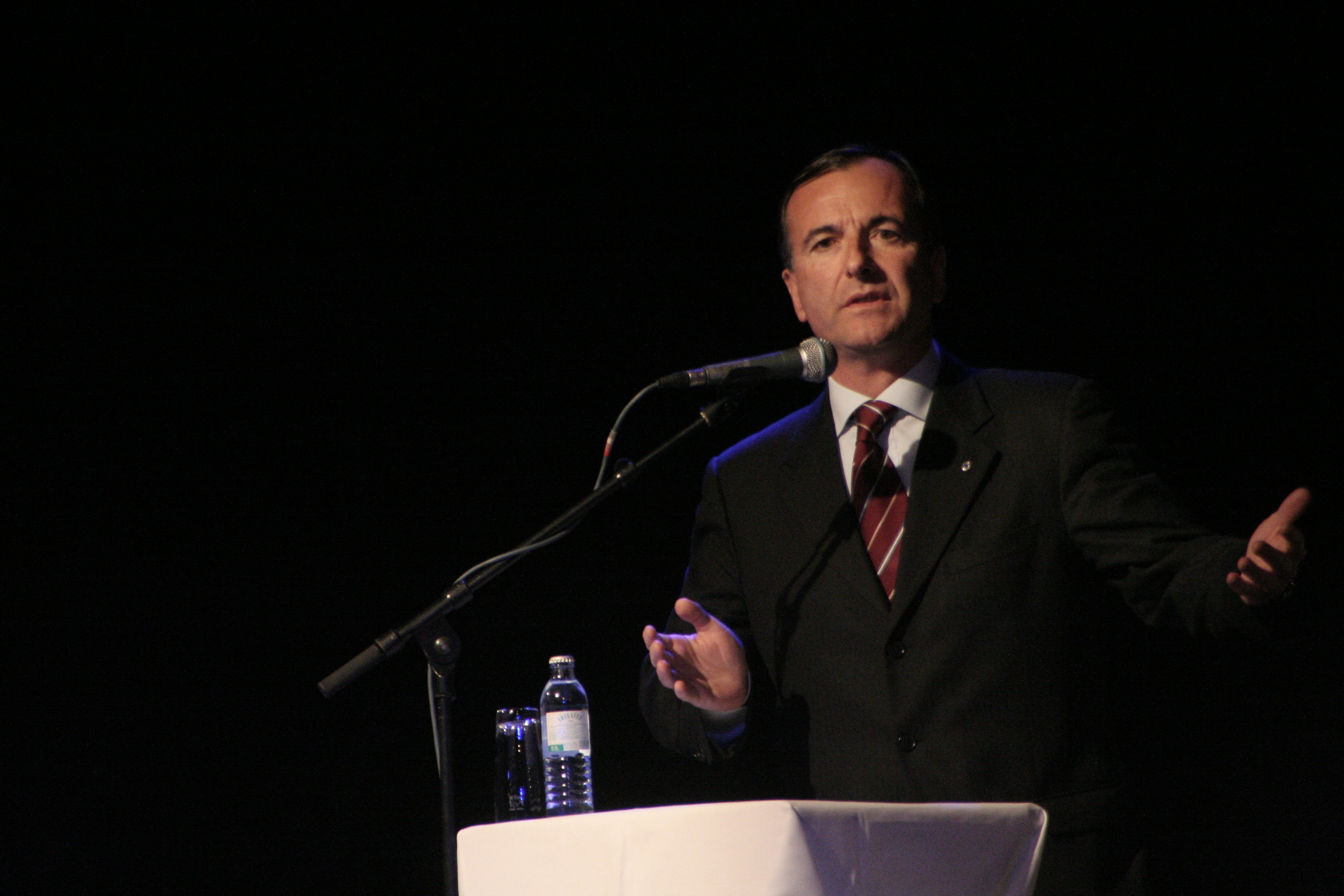
Frattini giving a speech at the European Youth Parliament in 2007

On 4 November 2004, Frattini was named by Berlusconi to take up the Justice and security portfolio in the European Commission, replacing the controversial Rocco Buttiglione, whose appointment had been rejected by the European Parliament. The appointment of Frattini as European Commissioner for Justice, Freedom, and Security raised concerns from the British Liberal Democrat MEP Sarah Ludford, due to accusations of belonging to Freemasonry, raised by Buttiglione himself towards Frattini and denied by the latter. Frattini was also afforded one of the five seats as vice-president of the European Commission.

In February 2006, during the Danish cartoons row, Frattini defended the media's freedom of speech, though he did express disagreement with subject of the cartoons. In November 2006, the commissioner's concern for child welfare extended to video games, calling for tougher controls; anything relating to stricter self-regulation to an outright ban. In 2007, Frattini called for a ban on the horror title Rule of Rose, and criticised the EU-endorsed PEGI system for granting the game a 16-years-or-over age rating. Reports on GameSpot showed he was seeking a Europe-wide ban on violent videogames. On 6 February 2007, during the Safer Internet Day 2007, Frattini recalled the need to protect children's rights, saying: "I am deeply concerned at this potential harm by the internet to children. This could involve people preying on them or children accessing racist, cruel or violent material."

At the start of 2007, Frattini backed an Italian push for EU support of a worldwide ban on the death penalty, while in April 2007, he asked for more powers to be given to Eurojust, advocating the power to initiate prosecutions with a European Public Prosecutor. Moreover, following the 2007 Glasgow International Airport attack, he criticised the handling of Islam by member-states and called for a "European Islam". Interviewed by Reuters he declared his intention to promote online communications monitoring and censorship of "dangerous words" like "bomb, kill, genocide or terrorism".

As European Commissioner, he promoted a "visa facilitation agreement between the European Community and the Russian Federation" (2007/340/EC: Council Decision of 19 April 2007), which however led to the expulsion of countless citizens Europeans domiciled for a long time in Russia on the basis of annual visas, which due to the introduction by the agreement of a limit of stay in the territory of maximum 90 days out of 180 were forced to leave the country, not being able to reside on the spot on the basis of unlimited annual visas as happened in the past. Article 5 of the law of the Russian Federation 25 July 2002 n.115, provides in fact the limit of 90 days of stay only to those who are not subject to the visa regime, but the agreement drawn up by Frattini extends this limit to all the citizens of the Union.

In 2008, Frattini joined the newly formed People of Freedom (PdL) and left on unpaid leave as Commissioner to run for election in Italy. He did not directly resign from his Commissioner post, to avoid that his successor be appointed by the out-going Prodi II Cabinet. He only resigned as Commissioner after taking up the position of Foreign Minister in the Berlusconi IV government. The role of European Commissioner from Italy was then assigned to Antonio Tajani, another member of PdL, with responsibility for transports rather than for justice. Frattini was the second ever European Commissioner from Italy to choose Italian over European politics, after the resignation of Franco Maria Malfatti in 1972.

During his term as European Commissioner, Frattini was also appointed by Prime Minister Berlusconi to the coordinate assistance from the government for the conduct of the Winter Olympics in Turin 2006.

== Minister of Foreign Affairs (2008–2011) ==
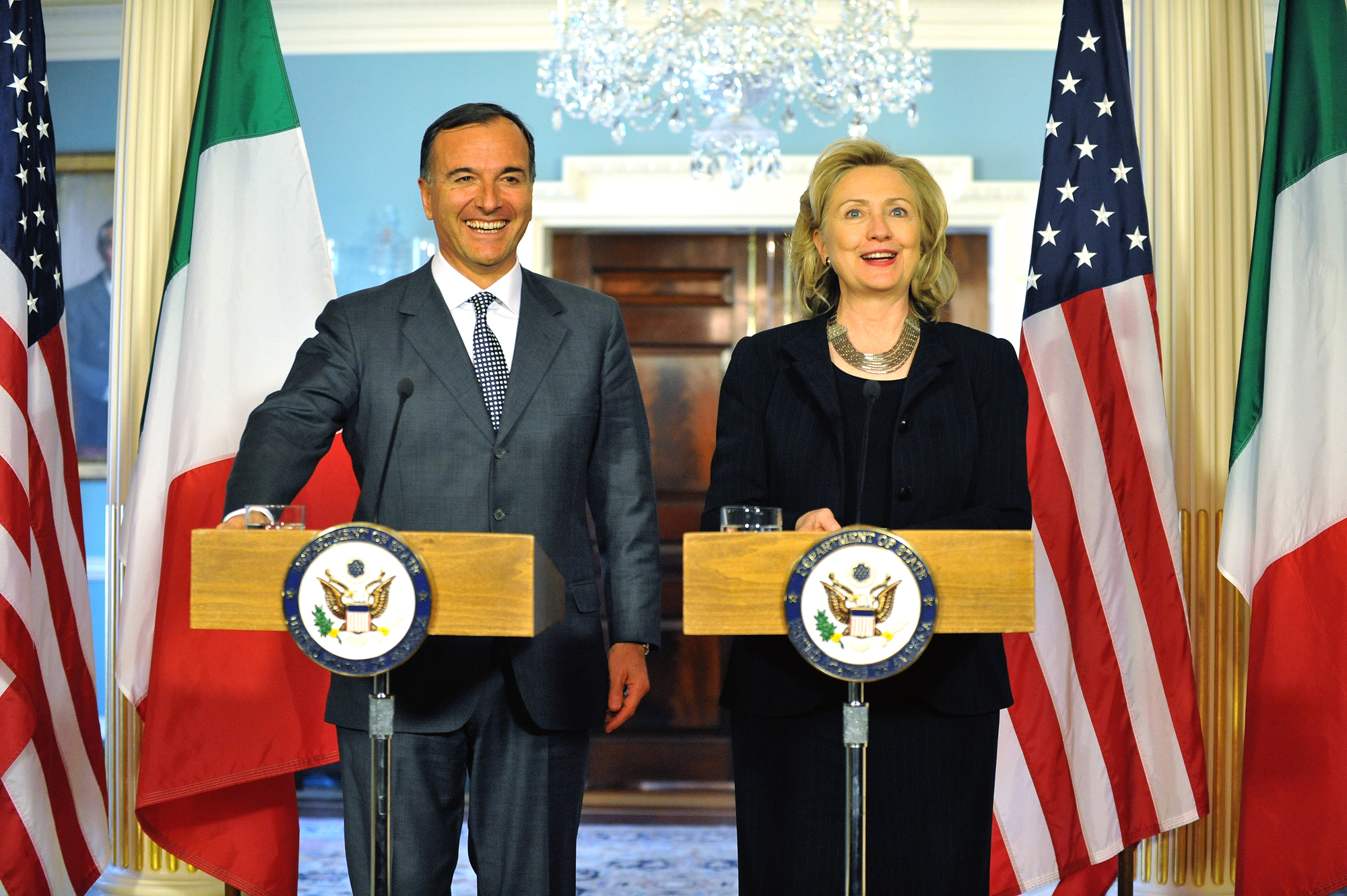
Franco Frattini with U.S. Secretary of State Hillary Clinton, in 2011

At the 2008 snap election Frattini ran in north-eastern constituency of Friuli-Venezia Giulia and was elected to the Chamber of Deputies. From 2008 to 2011, Frattini once again served as foreign minister.

=== Benghazi Treaty and migration policy ===
During the first summer of his second foreign ministry the "Treaty of friendship between Italy and Libya" was signed (so-called Benghazi agreement); with this treaty, Libya under Muammar Gaddafi agreed to repatriate the boats of sub-Saharan migrants from the Libyan coast to Italy. Cooperation between the two coast guards started in May 2009, with protests from international groups for the protection of human rights, which criticized the return of migrants – including eligible asylum seekers – to Libya, which had not ratified the UN Convention on Refugees; the policy was subsequently suspended but not officially repudiated. Frattini had openly supported the policy of respingimenti, contrary to the international humanitarian law principle of non-refoulement, describing such policy as a "due application of European rules", and stamping as "unworthy" the 2010 report by Amnesty International that highlighted the critical nature of this policy in light of international and European law.

In September 2010, on the occasion of the second visit of Gaddafi to Rome, Frattini declared "We have blocked the trafficking of illegal immigrants", despite the figures showing the continuation of migratory flows, and despite being mainly people entitled to forms of international protection. In February 2011, in a set-up changed by the Arab spring uprisings, Frattini claimed to want to "mobilize the Mediterranean countries" and the EU, through the Frontex agency, for patrols and refoulements. However following the fall of the governments of Zine El Abidine Ben Ali in Tunisia and Gaddafi in Libya, the number of migrants attempting to reach Italy and Europe surged. Italy's response to these migrants has been criticized by organizations including Amnesty International and the United Nations High Commissioner for Refugees.

The European Court of Human Rights, in the Hirsi v. Italy ruling of 23 February 2012, condemned Italy for breach of the convention, in particular with regard to Article 3 (prohibition of torture and inhuman and degrading treatment) and Article 4 of Protocol IV (prohibition of collective expulsions); in this case, 200 Somali and Eritrean migrants had been rejected in Libya under the Benghazi agreement, without having the possibility of applying for asylum in Europe.

=== Foreign policy ===
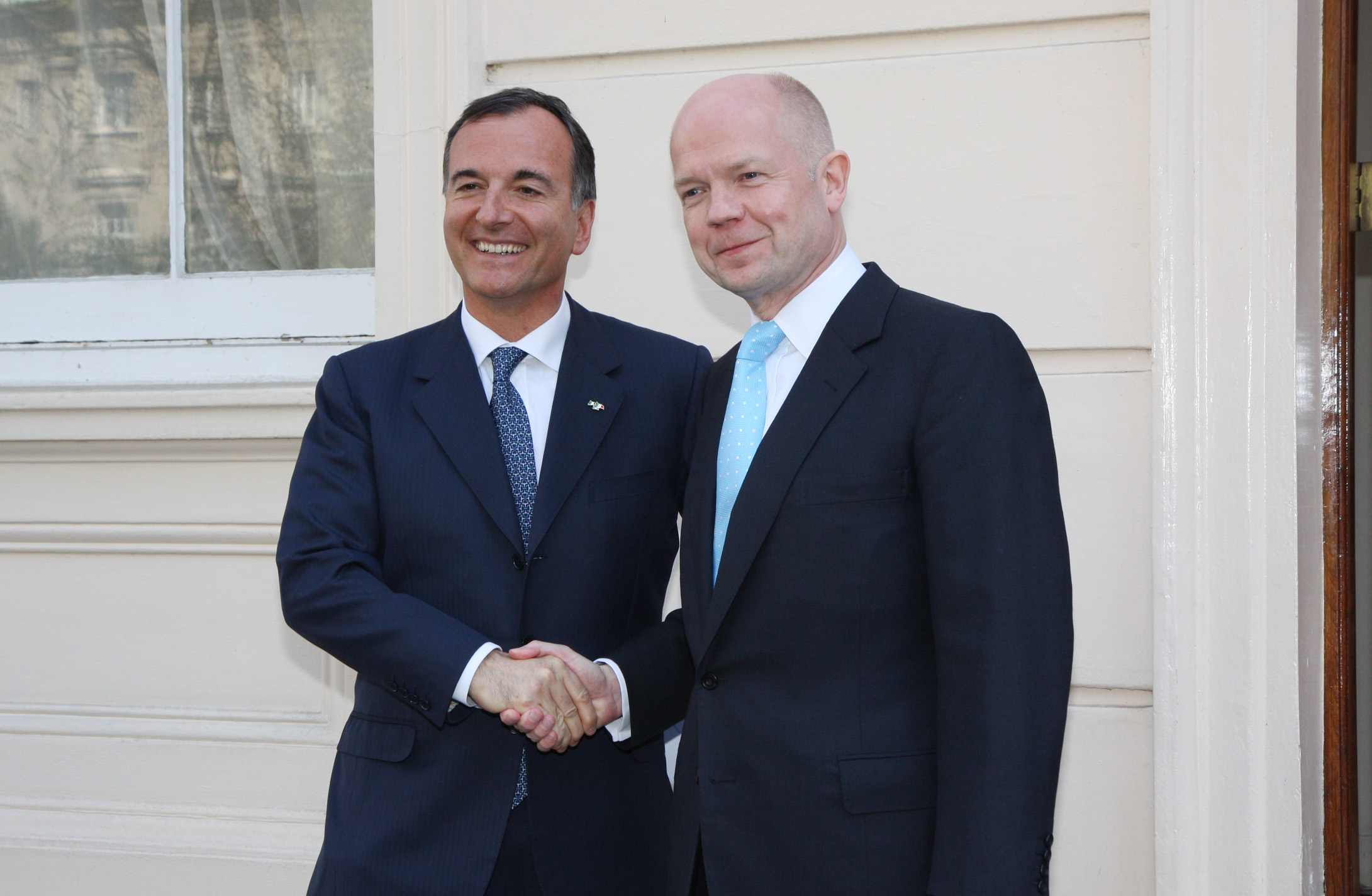
Frattini with the UK Foreign Secretary, William Hague, in 2011

The reaction of Italian diplomacy, led by Frattini, to the revolts of the Arab spring and the Libyan civil war was defined as "reactive" and "unrealistic" by the ISPI-IAI 2012 report edited by Alessandro Colombo and Ettore Greco.

Like other Western countries, Italy was completely taken aback by the Arab uprisings, and after a first moment at a loss for words it tried to frame the phenomenon in the reassuring discourse of democratization, reassured by the absence of Islamist symbols or anti-Western slogans. If the initial hesitations and the abrupt U-turn on the Qaddafi regime can constitute an element in common with other countries, Italy is the only international actor who long sought to "cling to its own imaginary role of mediator ", for which however lacked both power and necessary authority. With the evolution of the conflict, Frattini and Italian diplomacy resorted to the "usual option to follow the stronger allies", facilitated in this by the "dilution of Franco-British unilateralism in the multilateral framework of NATO" and by the guarantee of U.S. participation.

As far as European politics is concerned, according to Colombo and Greco, the reaction capacity of the Berlusconi IV government proved to be "totally insufficient", in the absence of a coherent long-term and vulnerable strategy to the internal divisions of the majority and to a "persistent underestimation of risks ". According to Colombo and Greco, the attitude of the Berlusconi IV government over the EU was "particularly erratic", pointing to the Union from time to time as a mandatory external constraint, the cause of national evils, or the only source of salvation. This volatility led to the projection of an image of an unreliable Italy in Europe. Frattini and Italian diplomacy also lost the initiative in proposing themselves in Europe as an engine or co-star of pro-integration coalitions, dealing with Europe only in an "occasional and distracted" manner, and rather caring for important bilateral relations (with Russia and Turkey, for example), regardless of the international and European context, according to a "small cabotage" policy. All of this, coupled with the Merkel-Sarkozy duo's inclination to leave other actors out, led to Italy's exclusion from the main European policy initiatives. This deficit of attention to the European Union, resulting in a growing isolation, has also had implications in other areas of foreign policy: the difficulties in relations with the United States, for example, are traced by Colombo and Greco to the widespread overseas perception of a growing marginalization of Italy in the European context.

=== Controversies ===
During the Russian invasion of Georgia in the summer of 2008, Frattini was on vacation in the Maldives. The representation of Italy during the urgent meetings of EU foreign ministers was ensured by the undersecretary Vincenzo Scotti. While at the end of December 2008, during Israel's war on Gaza (Operation Cast Lead), Frattini was on holiday again. Frattini's live interview with TG1 in a skiing suit raised controversy over inappropriate and disrespectful clothing.

In November 2010, Frattini dubbed the WikiLeaks revelations as the "September 11 of diplomacy" and stated that Julian Assange "wants to destroy the world". The U.S. ambassador in Italy, Ronald Spogli, informed Washington, in a confidential cable distributed by WikiLeaks, of how Berlusconi "constantly refuses the strategic advice of his Foreign Ministry, demoralized, devoid of resources and increasingly irrelevant". Frattini's weakness was detected by the United States particularly with regard to Italian-Russian relations.

== Later activities ==
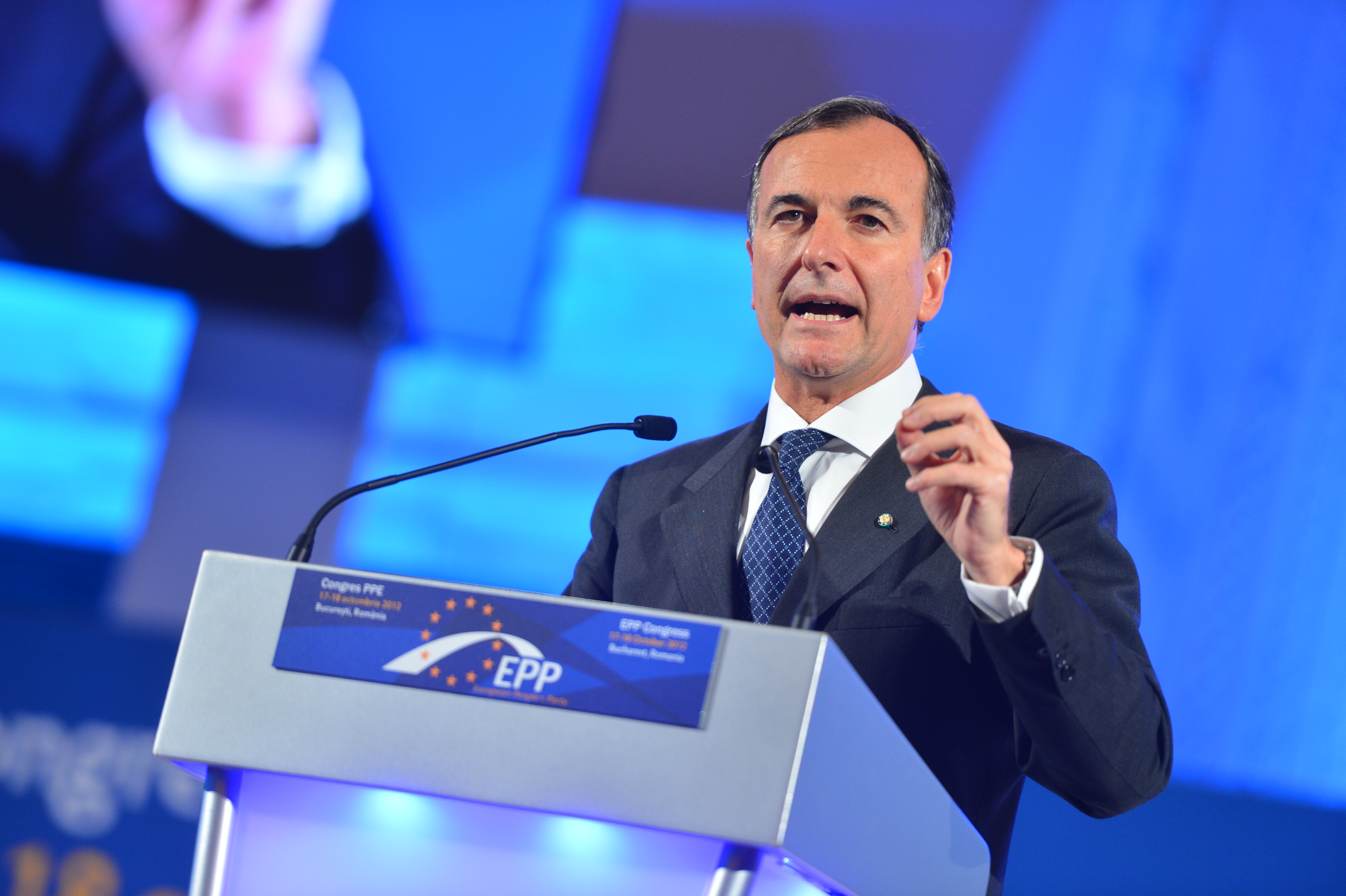
Frattini speaking at an EPP summit in 2012

In 2011 Frattini was briefly president of the Alcide De Gasperi Foundation and from 2011 he was president of the Italian Society for International Organization (SIOI), an emanation of the Italian Ministry of Foreign Affairs. Frattini was the first politician to hold SIOI chairmanship, until then reserved for diplomats and academics of the highest level. He later joined the "Institute of Eurasian Studies" and served as its president.

In December 2012, Frattini left the PdL, later defining the leadership of the new party, Forza Italia, as "extremists". In 2012, Frattini received the honorary citizenship of the city of Tirana.

Frattini did not run for the 2013 Italian general election, while supporting the "Agenda Monti" and Scelta Civica. Frattini later recovered his position as a member of the judiciary and Chamber President of the Italian Council of State.

Since 2013, Frattini was a consultant to the Serbian government of Aleksandar Vučić for the European integration of Serbia, succeeding Dominique Strauss-Kahn and Alfred Gusenbauer.

Since 2014, Frattini was a member of the high court of sports justice of CONI, a court of last resort of the Italian sports system. He exercised his function as judge for the Parma case, decreeing in May 2014 that the Emilian soccer team could not play in the Europa League.

In May 2014, Frattini was awarded an honorary degree from the Diplomatic Academy of the Ministry of Foreign Affairs of the Russian Federation for his commitment to the development of “mutual understanding and relations” between Italy and Russia.

Frattini was a candidate to succeed Anders Fogh Rasmussen for the post of NATO's secretary general in October 2014, but the post was given to Jens Stoltenberg.

In 2018, on the occasion of the Italian presidency of the OSCE, Foreign Minister Angelino Alfano appointed Frattini as "Special representative of the OSCE presidency for the process of resolving the conflict in Transnistria". Among his credentials, Frattini said: "I have excellent relations with the Russian authorities, which undoubtedly played a fundamental role in the resolution [of the conflict] in Transnistria," in addition to reminding all of his own role in starting the process of liberalization of Schengen visas for Moldova.

In 2020, while holding a sport judge position in the trial of the doping case of PRC swimmer Sun Yang, it was revealed that Frattimi had made comments about dog meat eating in China and used derogatory terms against the Chinese people on social media over a number of years. Concerns over his anti-China bias persuaded the federal court that Frattini should not have presided over banning the PRC swimmer.

Franco Frattini was an honorary professor at the Diplomatic Academy of the Russian Foreign Ministry. As of September 2020, he was a member of the Italian Aspen Institute.

== Positions ==
Interviewed by Reuters in 2007, Frattini said it was his intention to investigate technical possibilities for implementing internet monitoring of "dangerous words" such as "bombs", "killing", "genocide", and "terrorism". The project did not see the light of day.

In 2007, Frattini was censured by the European Parliament for his statements against the freedom of movement of people in the EU. In the interview granted and published on 2 November 2007, Frattini stressed that, to respond to the security problem, "what is to be done is simple: you go to a nomad camp in Rome, for example on the Christopher Columbus, and to those who are there you ask" what's your life? If all year 'I do not know', you take it and send it back to Romania. This is how the European directive works: simple and without escape." The motion of censure, presented by the European left, was voted to a large extent: 306 yes, 86 no, and 37 abstentions.

In March 2009, Frattini condemned the 2009 Durban Review Conference, terming the final document unacceptable, since it included positions that emerged in the 2001 conference, which qualified Zionism as a form of racism.

Frattini later made declarations against multiculturalism, but in favour of the administrative vote for regular migrants, and pleaded for a common European policy on migration.

In November 2009, he called "suggestive" Roberto Castelli's proposal for a constitutional amendment to include a cross in the Italian flag: "For now we wish to defend the right to keep the crucifix in our [school] classes, later we'll see if we can do more." He added: "There are nine European countries that have the cross in their flag, it's an absolutely normal proposal."

On 22 October 2010, he declared to the Osservatore Romano that Judaism, Christianity, and Islam should ally to fight atheism, which he defined, in the same interview, as a "perverse phenomenon" on a par with extremism. These statements raised criticisms of numerous commentators and members of UAAR, who requested his resignation. Frattini reiterated in 2017 that relativism is the third threat to Europe after religious extremism and militant secularism.

In November 2010, he defined the revelations of WikiLeaks as "the 9/11 of world diplomacy", and said that Julian Assange "wants to destroy the world".

== Personal life and death ==
Frattini died of cancer on 24 December 2022, at the age of 65.

== Electoral history ==
| Election | House | Constituency | Party | Votes | Result |
|---|---|---|---|---|---|
| 1996 | Chamber of Deputies | Bolzano | FI | 36,510 | Elected |
| 2001 | Chamber of Deputies | Bolzano | FI | 32,171 | Not elected |
| 2001 | Chamber of Deputies | Veneto 2 | FI | – (Note: Elected in a closed list proportional representation system.) | Elected |
| 2008 | Chamber of Deputies | Friuli-Venezia Giulia | PdL | – | Elected |

=== First-past-the-post elections ===
1996 general election (C): Bolzano
| Candidate | Coalition or Party | Votes | % |
|---|---|---|---|
| Franco Frattini | Pole of Freedoms | 36,510 | 46.8 |
| Ennio Chiodi | The Olive Tree | 34,914 | 44.8 |
| Others | | 6,531 | 8.4 |
| Total | | 77,955 | 100.0 |

2001 general election (C): Bolzano
| Candidate | Coalition or Party | Votes | % |
|---|---|---|---|
| Claudio Bressa | The Olive Tree–SVP | 37,577 | 49.0 |
| Franco Frattini | House of Freedoms | 32,171 | 42.0 |
| Cristina Zanella | Italy of Values | 4,003 | 5.2 |
| Achille Chiomento | Bonino List–Pannella List | 2,922 | 3.8 |
| Total | | 76,673 | 100.0 |

== Honors ==
Frattini received Medaglia Teresiana at University of Pavia in 2008.

=== Foreign honours ===
- Malaysia: Honorary Grand Commander of the Order of Loyalty to the Crown of Malaysia (2003)
- Uruguay: Grand Officer of the Medal of the Oriental Republic of Uruguay (2003)
- Russia: honorary degree from the Diplomatic Academy of the Ministry of Foreign Affairs of the Russian Federation for his commitment to the development of “mutual understanding and relations” between Italy and Russia (May 2014).

Political offices
| Preceded by Giuliano Urbani | Minister of Civil Service and Regional Affairs; 1995–1996 | Succeeded by Franco Bassanini |
| Preceded by Piero Barucci | Minister of Public Function; 2001–2002 | Succeeded by Mario Baccini |
| Preceded by Silvio Berlusconi; Acting | Minister of Foreign Affairs; 2002–2004 | Succeeded by Gianfranco Fini |
| Preceded by Mario Monti | Italian European Commissioner; 2004–2008 | Succeeded by Antonio Tajani |
| Preceded by Romano Prodi | Italian European Commissioner; 2004–2008 | Succeeded by Antonio Tajani |
| Preceded by António Vitorino | European Commissioner for Justice; 2004–2008 | Succeeded by Jacques Barrot |
| Preceded by Massimo D'Alema | Minister of Foreign Affairs; 2008–2011 | Succeeded by Giulio Terzi di Sant'Agata |
Legal offices
| Preceded by Filippo Patroni Griffi | President of the Italian Council of State; 2022 | Succeeded by Luigi Maruotti |
