= Fabrizio Quattrocchi =

Italian security officer (1968–2004)

- Born: 9 May 1968; Catania, Italy
- Died: 14 April 2004 (aged 35); Iraq
- Cause of death: Execution by shooting
- Occupation: Security officer

Fabrizio Quattrocchi (9 May 1968 – 14 April 2004) was an Italian security operator taken hostage and subsequently killed by insurgents in the Iraq War.

== Hostage taking ==
Quattrocchi was taken hostage together with three fellow Italians, Umberto Cupertino, Maurizio Agliana and Salvatore Stefio. They had been working in Iraq as security contractors under contract with DTS Security LLC, a security company incorporated in the U.S. state of Nevada, run by Paolo Simeone (a former Italian Marine and French Legionnaire) and an Italian lawyer, Valeria Castellani. Quattrocchi's kidnappers forced him to dig his own grave and kneel beside it wearing a hood as they prepared to film his death, but he defied them by trying to pull off the hood and shouting "Vi faccio vedere come muore un italiano!" - "I'll show you how an Italian dies!" He was then shot in the back of the neck.

Cupertino, Agliana and Stefio would later be freed in a bloodless raid by U.S. troops, which Italian prime minister Silvio Berlusconi said he had approved beforehand.

== Honours ==
On 20 March 2006, Quattrocchi was posthumously honored by the Italian president Carlo Azeglio Ciampi with the Gold Medal for Civil Valour, after a proposal by the Home Secretary Giuseppe Pisanu. For the Gold Medal for Civil Valour to be awarded, a specific act of valor is required, and Quattrocchi's defiance towards his captors was judged deserving of the award.

== Political implications ==
Quattrocchi's death became a highly divisive issue among the Italian public, which, despite widespread loathing of both Saddam Hussein's late regime and Islamist fundamentalism was mostly averse to participation in the Iraq war. The relatives of the victims of the 2003 Nasiriyah bombing (in which 17 Italian servicemen and two Italian civilians were killed by a truck bomb) complained that while Quattrocchi was awarded the Gold Medal, those Italian soldiers were awarded with the "Croce d'Onore" ("Cross of Honour"), as posthumous honour, even though they were in service as regular soldiers, unlike Quattrocchi. For this reason, according to them, the victims of the Nasiriyah attack deserved such an honour more than Quattrocchi.

Giuliana Sgrena, an Italian left-wing journalist who was also kidnapped in Iraq, complained that no similar honour had been awarded to Nicola Calipari, an Italian intelligence agent killed by American friendly fire during the rescue of Giuliana Sgrena. Similarly, Sgrena remarked, neither was Enzo Baldoni, another Italian journalist kidnapped and killed in Iraq, awarded any honour. As the leftist side was not enthusiastic about the award, the rightist parties Alleanza Nazionale and Forza Italia (Silvio Berlusconi's movement at that time), insisted in their PR campaigns that Quattrocchi was a hero.
