= Rocco Buttiglione =

Italian politician (born 1948)

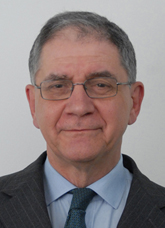

Minister of Culture and Tourism
- In office 23 April 2005 – 17 May 2006
- Prime Minister: Silvio Berlusconi
- Deputy: Antonio Martusciello
- Preceded by: Giuliano Urbani
- Succeeded by: Francesco Rutelli

Minister of European Affairs
- In office 11 June 2001 – 23 April 2005
- Prime Minister: Silvio Berlusconi
- Preceded by: Gianni Francesco Mattioli
- Succeeded by: Giorgio La Malfa

Personal details
- Born: Rocco Buttiglione; 6 June 1948 (age 78) Gallipoli, Italy
- Party: DC (before 1994); PPI (1994–1995); CDU 1995–2002); UDC (since 2002)
- Height: 1.80 m (5 ft 11 in)
- Spouse: Maria Pia Corbò
- Occupation: Politician

Rocco Buttiglione (Italian: [ˈrɔkko buttiʎˈʎoːne]; born 6 June 1948) is an Italian Union of Christian and Centre Democrats politician and an academic. Buttiglione's nomination for a post as European Commissioner with a portfolio that was to include civil liberties, resulted in controversy as some political groups opposed him for his conservative Catholic views on homosexuality, despite his assurances that these were only his personal convictions and would not dictate his administration.

Buttiglione is a Professor of political science at Saint Pius V University in Rome, and member of the Pontifical Academy of Social Sciences. He served as a minister for EU policies (from 2001 to 2005) and then as Minister for Cultural Assets and Activities (from 2005 to 2006) in Silvio Berlusconi's governments. In 2005 Buttiglione received an honorary doctoral degree from Guatemalan Francisco Marroquín University for "his commitment to the ideas of liberty". In May 2006, he unsuccessfully ran for mayor of Turin.

== Early career ==
Rocco Buttiglione was born in Gallipoli, Apulia, on the "heel" of Italy. He studied law in Turin and Rome and became a Professor of political science at Saint Pius V University in Rome. He was also a professor of philosophy and acting rector at the International Academy for Philosophy in Liechtenstein.

Rocco Buttiglione first attained attention on the Italian political stage when in 1994 he became secretary of the Italian People's Party, the largest of the parties that emerged from the collapse of Christian Democracy, formerly the largest party in Italy since the Second World War, after the Tangentopoli corruption scandals. The People's Party had presented itself along with Patto Segni in the centrist alliance Pact for Italy, in which it came third after Silvio Berlusconi's centre-right Pole of Freedoms/Pole of Good Government and the centre-left Alliance of Progressives.

Buttiglione eventually joined forces with Berlusconi and the Northern League, led by Umberto Bossi, to win the 2001 election. Buttiglione was elected a Parliamentary Deputy for Milan in May 2001, and joined Berlusconi's new government as the European Union Policy Minister. From 2005-06 Buttiglione was Minister for Cultural Assets and Activities.

== Nominee for the European Commission ==
=== Background to the nomination ===
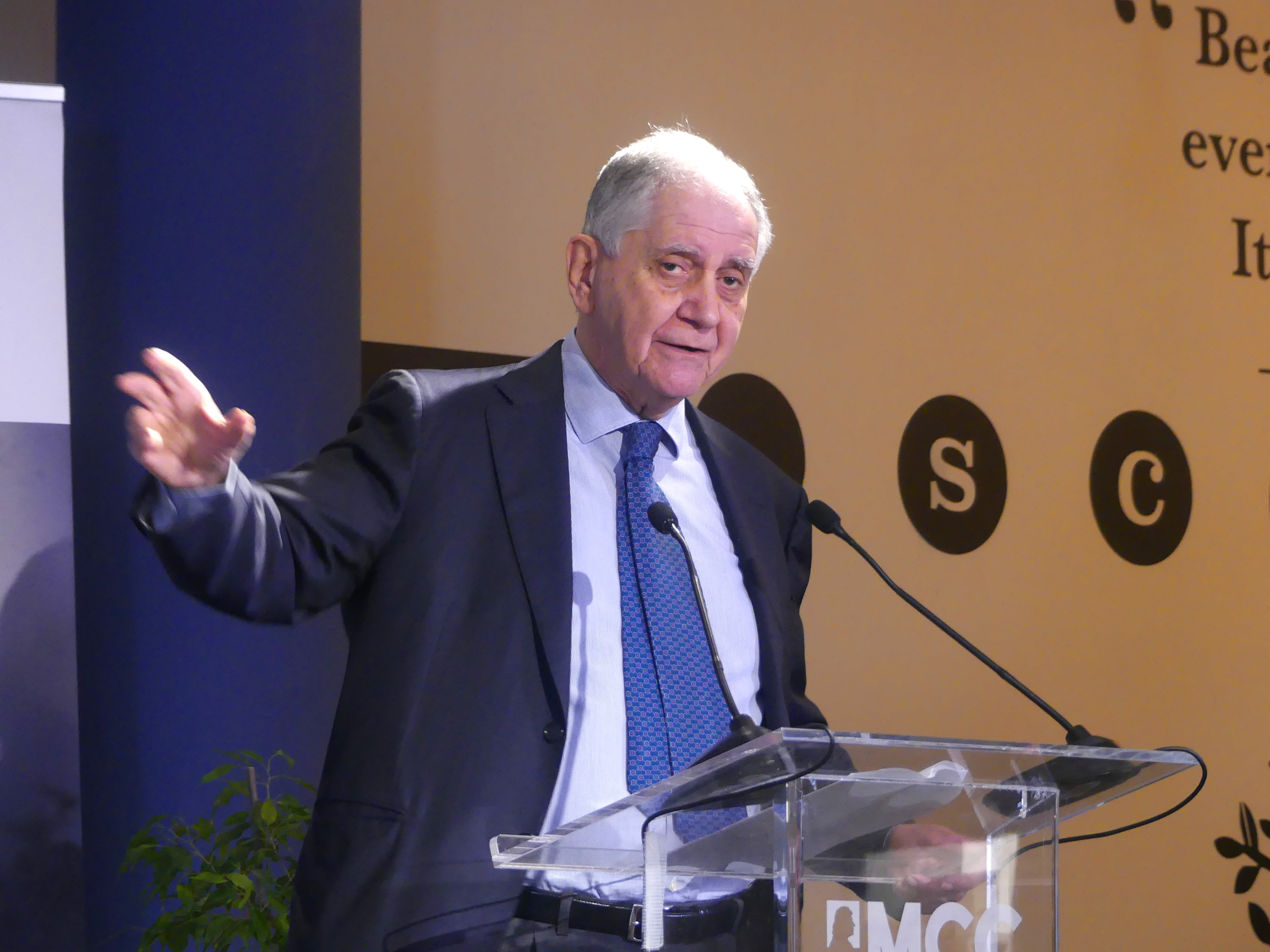
Rocco Buttiglione at Mathias Corvinus Collegium (Budapest)

Following an increase of popular support for his socially conservative Catholic political party, the Union of Christian and Centre Democrats (UDC), at a time of political difficulty for Silvio Berlusconi's government, the UDC leader, Marco Follini, asked for more influence in the government. At this point the UDC was lobbying against the powerful Economy Minister Giulio Tremonti, supported by Umberto Bossi's Northern League; Subsequently, Tremonti was ousted from office and replaced with the politically more neutral Domenico Siniscalco.

The new balance of power inside the ruling coalition effectively entitled the UDC to ask for even more and it was therefore decided that Rocco Buttiglione, already a minister in the government, would become Italy's member of the European Commission. As a result, his place in the Italian government was granted to another member of the UDC. Buttiglione's apparent qualifications included speaking foreign languages, including English, German, French, Portuguese, Spanish and Polish. In 2004, José Manuel Barroso included him on his list of nominees for the European Commission, with a designated portfolio of Justice, Freedom and Security.

=== Controversy ===
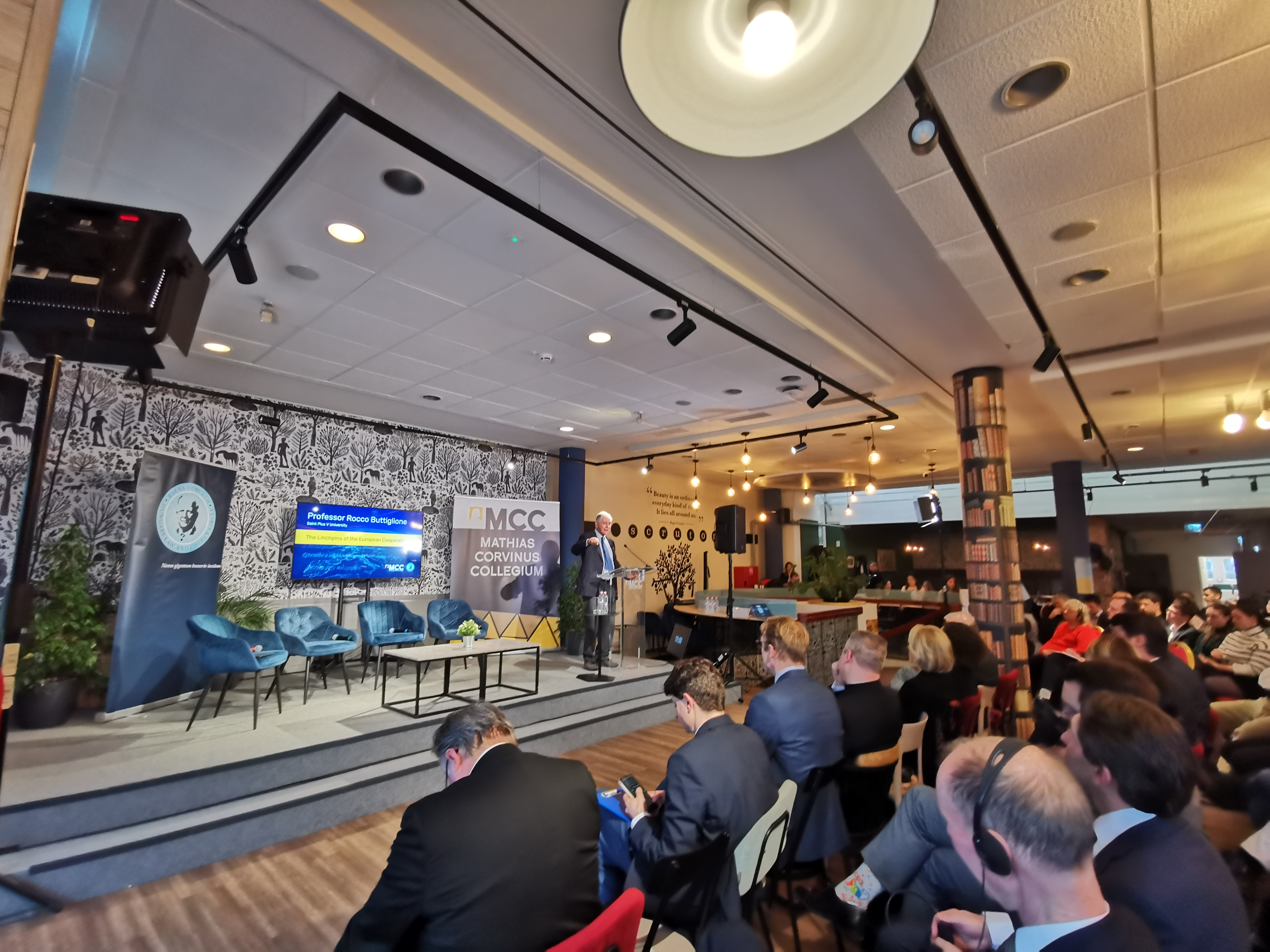
Buttiglione: The Linchpins of the European Cooperation

The nomination resulted in controversy. During his hearing before the European Parliament's Committee on Civil Liberties, Justice And Home Affairs, Buttiglione - a Catholic - was asked about his stance on homosexuality and women. Buttiglione responded that while he considered homosexuality a sin, his personal opinion would not prevent him from moving against discrimination of homosexuals. He also stated his belief that the family "exists in order to allow women to have children and to have the protection of a male who takes care of them".

The PES, ALDE, and Green/EFA groups expressed reservations regarding Buttiglione's ability to take positive political action in the area of civil rights, particularly in regards combating discrimination, and threatened to reject the entire proposed Commission. On 11 October the committee voted by 27-26 not to endorse the nomination. After it became clear that a vote on 27 October in the European Parliament, to approve the Commission, would not succeed, José Manuel Barroso withdrew his proposed Commission. Italian conservative and Catholic politicians and church leaders rallied to defend Buttiglione's views. "This decision shows the real face of Europe, a face which we don't like. It's fundamentalist, which is absolutely not on", said Justice Minister Roberto Castelli.

On 21 October José Manuel Barroso attempted to defuse the row by indicating that civil liberties, human rights and discrimination issues would be handled by a special panel that would include Buttiglione but that Barroso himself would chair it. "The new Commission will be absolutely opposed to any kind of discrimination based on sexual orientation, gender, or religious beliefs", he stated. On 30 October Prime Minister Silvio Berlusconi's government withdrew Buttiglione's nomination, keeping him in his office of minister in the Italian government. "The new soft totalitarianism that is advancing on the left wants to have a state religion. It is an atheist, nihilistic religion - but it is a religion that is obligatory for all", Buttiglione subsequently commented.

Foreign minister Franco Frattini was later indicated as a possible alternative, with the implicit promise that his ministry would then go to Gianfranco Fini, whose party had recently increased its influence in the government coalition. However, there were still rumors that Giulio Tremonti, supported by the Northern League, might be picked for the job, but eventually Frattini was nominated and appointed. In response to the veto of Buttiglione's candidature, a collection of Christian personalities in 2008 (with Buttiglione himself as Founding Patron) formed the Dignitatis Humanae Institute to oversee the creation of a network of parliamentary working groups on human dignity across a diverse number of legislatures, with the aim of protecting the integrity of Christians serving in public life.

== Turin mayoral election ==
Rocco Buttiglione ran as the candidate for his coalition, the House of Freedoms, for the office of Mayor in Turin. His opponent was the incumbent Sergio Chiamparino, member of The Union. Turin had been a left-wing stronghold in the previous general elections and the city hosted successfully the 2006 Winter Olympics, making Buttiglione's challenge very difficult. Adding to that, some wondered why such a hard-line conservative, who had never lived in Turin before, was proposed for the office, calling Buttiglione's move as a political suicide. After a poor campaign results were disastrous; Sergio Chiamparino, who had been elected in the previous elections with 52.8% of the votes, scored 66.6% of the votes against Buttiglione, and became the first Turin mayor to be elected at the first turn.

== Financial investigations ==
It has also emerged that Buttiglione was investigated by the authorities in Monaco in 2002 over possible illegal money laundering in favour of his political party. At the end no evidence was found that a crime had been committed. Giampiero Catone, a senior aide of Buttiglione, has been charged with "fraudulent bankruptcy" in Italy; and faces inquiries into the disappearance of millions of Euros of Italian and EU funds.

== Views on abortion ==
In an interview with Corriere della Sera, Italy's leading daily newspaper, Buttiglione was quoted as saying that he is opposed to efforts to create binding legal protections for the unborn in Italy. He later told the Catholic Family and Human Rights Institute that he had been misquoted and clarified that he meant it was unlikely that Italy would ban abortion given its political situation. He also stated that anti-abortion advocates should focus on reducing the demand for abortions by providing alternatives to mothers.

== Publications ==
- Dialettica e nostalgia (1978)
- La crisi dell’economia marxista: Gli inizi della scuola di Francoforte (1979)
- Il pensiero di Karol Wojtyla (1982)
- Ethik der Leistung (1988; co-edited with Hans Thomas)
- La crisi della morale (1991)
- Die Verantwortung des Menschen in einem globalen Weltzeitalter (1996; co-edited with Rocco Buttiglione, Radim Palouš, Josef Seifert)
- Wie erkennt man Naturrecht? (1998; co-edited with Josef Seifert)
- Karol Wojtyla: The Thought of the Man Who Became Pope John Paul II (1997)
- The moral mandate for freedom: Reflections on Centesimus Annus (1997)

Political offices
Preceded by Gianni Francesco Mattioli	Minister of European Affairs; 2001–2005	Succeeded by Giorgio La Malfa
Preceded by Giuliano Urbani	Minister of Culture and Tourism; 2005–2006	Succeeded by Francesco Rutelli
Party political offices
New office	Leader of the Union of Christian and Centre Democrats; 2002–present	Incumbent
