= Giuliano Urbani =

Italian journalist and politician (born 1937)

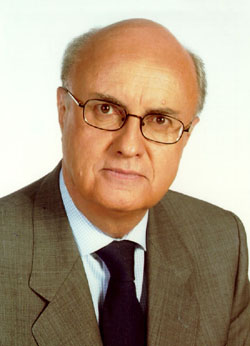

Minister of Cultural Heritage
- In office 11 June 2001 – 23 April 2005
- Prime Minister: Silvio Berlusconi
- Preceded by: Giovanna Melandri
- Succeeded by: Rocco Buttiglione

Minister for Public Administration and Regional Affairs
- In office 11 May 1994 – 17 January 1995
- Prime Minister: Silvio Berlusconi
- Preceded by: Livio Paladin; Sabino Cassese
- Succeeded by: Franco Frattini

Member of the Chamber of Deputies
- In office 15 April 1994 – 3 October 2005
- Constituency: Lombardy (1994–1996); Umbria (1996–2001); Vimercate (2001–2005)

Personal details
- Born: 9 June 1937 (age 89) Perugia, Italy
- Party: Forza Italia
- Education: University of Turin

Giuliano Urbani (born 9 June 1937) is an Italian academic and politician. He was the Minister of Cultural Heritage from 2001 to 2005.

== Early life ==
Urbani was born in Perugia, Umbria, on 9 June 1937.

=== Career and activities ===
Urbani is an academic by profession. He taught political sciences at Bocconi University in Milan until 1994. He was also a collaborator of Fininvest.

He is the cofounder and a leading member of the Forza Italia led by Silvio Berlusconi. He contributed to the development of the party's ideology. From 11 May 1994 to 17 January 1995 he served as state minister for public administration and regional affairs in the first cabinet of Berlusconi. Urbani was appointed minister of cultural heritage to the second cabinet of Prime Minister Berlusconi on 10 June 2001. Urbani was in office until 23 April 2005, when he was replaced by Rocco Buttiglione in the post.

In addition, he served at the Italian Parliament for three successive terms from 1996 to 2005. He was elected from Lombardia with the Forza Italia in all terms. As of September 2020, he was a member of the Italian Aspen Institute.

== Electoral history ==
Election	House	Constituency	Party	Votes	Result
1994	Chamber of Deputies	Lombardy 2	FI	– (Note: Elected in a closed list proportional representation system)	Elected
1996	Chamber of Deputies	Umbria at-large	FI	–	Elected
2001	Chamber of Deputies	Vimercate	FI	43,922	Elected

Political offices
Preceded by Giovanna Melandri	Italian Minister of Cultural Heritage; 2001–2005	Succeeded by Rocco Buttiglione
