= Mario Lozano =

United States Army specialist

Mario Lozano (born 1969/70) is a United States Army specialist, best known for once being indicted by an Italian court for his role in the death of Italian Secret Service officer Nicola Calipari in a supposed incident on Route Irish, immediately following the rescue of Giuliana Sgrena. Lozano was not the only American soldier involved in this incident, but received much more attention because he was the one who fired the machine gun killing Calipari. He was assigned to the 1st Battalion of the 69th Infantry Regiment, 42nd Infantry Division of the New York Army National Guard, based in Manhattan.

In 2007, a superior Italian court decided that Italy had no jurisdiction in this case—though renewed, this motivation has been since dubbed as wrong by the High Jury Italian court in 2008.

== Early life ==
Lozano is largely of Puerto Rican ancestry, although he has a paternal grandfather who was half Sicilian ancestry. He is a native of the Bronx borough of New York City, New York.

== Career ==
=== Involvement in the death of Nicola Calipari ===
Lozano shot and killed Secret Service agent Nicola Calipari in Baghdad during a disputed incident at BP 541, a blocking position (a loose term indicating a mobile roadblock that allows no traffic to pass) located behind a ninety-degree turn on the ramp joining Route Vernon to Route Irish. (The road was between the heavily fortified Green Zone and Baghdad International Airport.) Calipari was returning from a successful rescue mission to liberate Giuliana Sgrena, an Italian independent journalist, detained by Iraqi insurgents. Both Sgrena and a colleague of Calipari, Andrea Carpani, were wounded in the shooting.

Lozano and members of his squad had been directed to set up the blocking position as part of security measures for Ambassador John Negroponte's convoy from the city to the airport. Although the ambassador's convoy had already passed twenty minutes earlier, a communications failure with the dispatching unit (which had just deployed to Iraq, and was on the job for the first time), meant that Lozano's squad had been in place for more than eighty minutes, sixty-five minutes over the customary length.

An internal U.S. Army investigation cleared Lozano of any wrongdoing and concluded that he acted within the standing rules of engagement. It was pointed out during the Army investigation that Calipari, who had previously been in contact with the United States Embassy in Baghdad and had previously been sharing information and working with US Coalition forces in order to free Sgrena, did not share information about the rescue attempt with the embassy. In addition, two members of Lozano's unit were killed two days previously in a car bombing very near to where the incident occurred. While 58 bullets were missing from his M-240B machine gun, forensic evidence showed that the vehicle had been struck only a total of 11 times by the 7.62mm bullets, and that 2 had entered through the windshield. Lozano told investigators that he had fired the remaining bullets while test-firing his weapon and while attempting to walk the bullets up to the speeding car to warn it of the impending danger from the blocking position.

A related report and issued by Italian authorities, rather than accusing Lozano of being the sole culprit, pointed to the inappropriate placement of the blocking position (at the end of a one-way ramp between two highways) and lack of proper warning signals and/or concertina wire. The Italian report stated that because of the short span of visible road from the BP, Lozano, being in charge of both the searchlight used to warn incoming vehicles and of the machine gun, had only seconds to react, point the searchlight, warn the vehicle, assess it was not halting, man the weapon, aim, shoot warning shots, and then disabling shots.

==== Video ====
On May 8, 2007, the Italian television channel Canale 5 broadcast a video of the first moments after the shooting. In this video, Calipari's car is seen stopped on the road after the shooting, with the door open, the lights switched on, and apparently more than 50 meters away from the US Army Armored Humvee. This video contradicts claims by the US that the car was traveling with its lights switched off and was fired upon by Lozano when it was less than 50 meters from his position.

==== Political implications ====
Calipari's death caused a major international incident, since Calipari, a highly decorated SISMI agent, had become a national hero in Italy. As a result, there was significant pressure on the Italian government to publicly support another investigation into the shooting, this time being conducted by Italian prosecutors.

Italian Prime Minister Silvio Berlusconi indicated in Parliament on May 5, 2005, that the government remained fully committed to supporting the ongoing judicial investigation into Calipari's death. One of the most prominent leaders of the opposition in the lower house of parliament, Piero Fassino, called for the United States to facilitate cooperation with the investigation, indicating that they believed the U.S. Army should produce Lozano for questioning by the prosecuting magistrates.

Alfonso Pecoraro Scanio, head of the Italian Federation of the Greens, indicated that should the United States fail to cooperate with this investigation by allowing Lozano to be questioned, he would push for a hearing at the International Court of Justice.

The non-Italian media had been reporting that it was unlikely that Italy would seek to try Lozano in absentia were the U.S. to not render him to Italian custody. Despite the Italian government's desire to maintain a firm alliance with the United States an Italian judge has decided to try Lozano in absentia.

==== Judicial investigation ====
Italian prosecutors actively sought to interview Lozano as part of their criminal investigation into Calipari's death. On December 22, 2005, the special prosecutors of the Magistrate's service of Rome announced that they were considering charging Lozano with voluntary manslaughter.

On January 18, 2006, it was reported that the prosecutors had decided to charge Lozano with murder. The prosecutors indicated that despite making over twenty formal requests to the U.S., the U.S. refused to formally identify Lozano. After confirming Lozano's identity, the Magistrate service appointed an attorney to represent Lozano during the charging process.

In June 2006, the Italian government announced that prosecutors had formally charged Lozano with murder, and were considering an extradition request. The Italian government carried through with its request, which was subsequently denied by the U.S. government. Afterwards, the Italian authorities considered putting Lozano on trial in absentia.

Putting foreigners on trial in absentia is a relatively uncommon practice in Italy, but exceptions are made for cases of "political murder". Prosecutors in Italy announced that the case against Lozano qualified as a "political murder" case, and was thus eligible for trial in absentia.

In the meantime, newspapers in the United States quoted soldiers in Lozano's unit who said that he had been "devastated" when he learned that he had killed an Italian officer and wounded a female civilian, and that he was unable to sleep for days afterward.

On April 10, 2007, Lozano gave an interview to CBS Television in which he appeared deeply concerned about the legal proceeding in Italy, and very sorry about the "pain he'd provoked to the family of Nicola Calipari". He also reconfirmed the version he and his superiors already gave of the incident in Iraq, and provided a new insight: contrasting the opinion of Mrs. Sgrena's life partner Pier Scolari that he'd shot "300- or 400- rounds into and around the car", Lozano stated that this would have been impossible as he would have needed to reload his machine gun at least once or twice to fire that many rounds.

Lozano's trial in absentia began on April 17, 2007. On October 25, 2007, an Italian court dismissed the charges against Lozano after determining that multinational forces in Iraq were under the exclusive jurisdiction of the country that sent them.
