= Rescue of Giuliana Sgrena =

Covert operation by SISMI

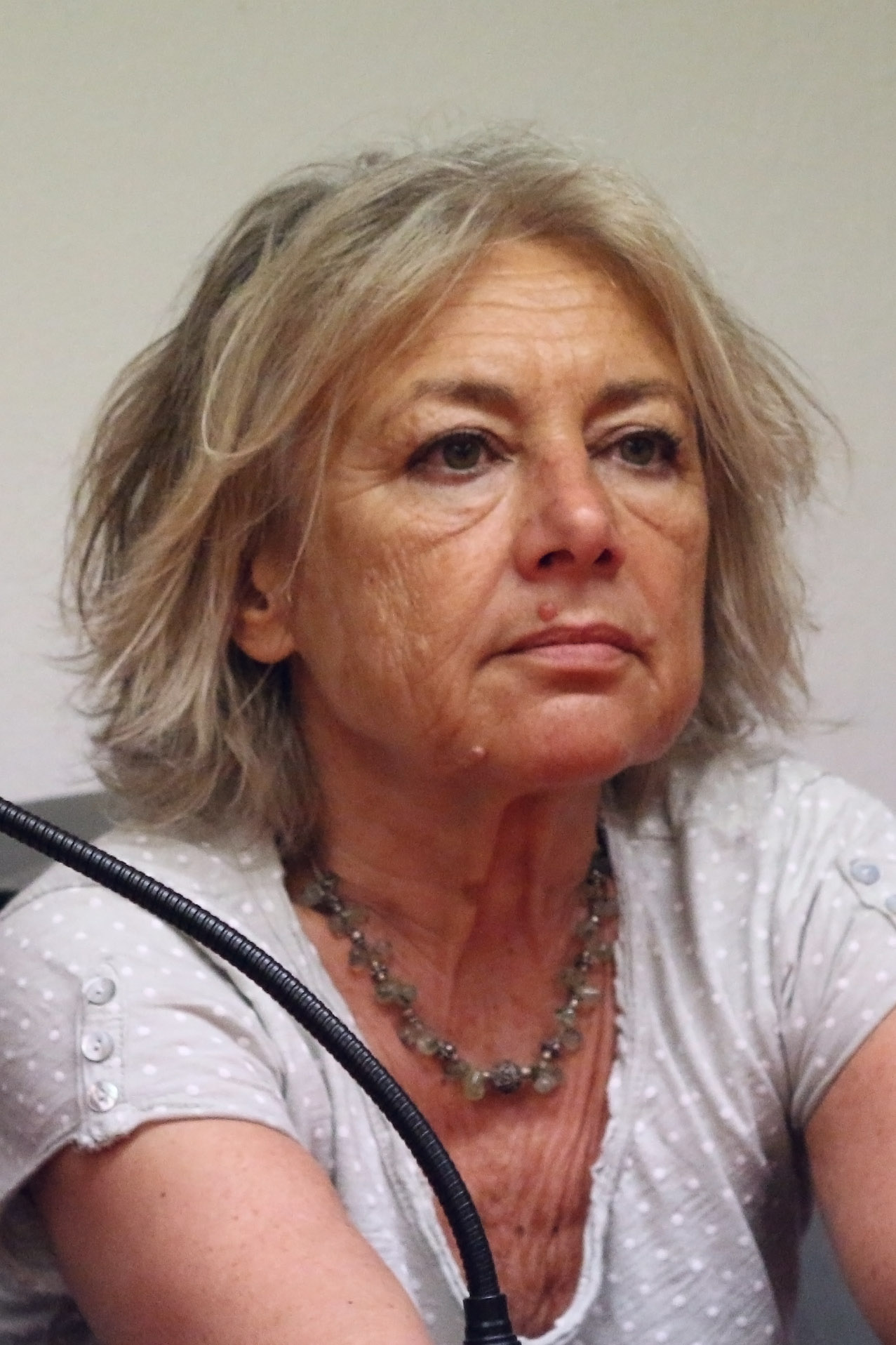
Giuliana Sgrena

On 4 March 2005, the Italian military secret service, SISMI, conducted a covert operation to rescue Italian journalist Giuliana Sgrena from kidnappers in Iraq. After the successful retrieval of Sgrena, the car with her and two secret agents came under friendly fire by US Army troops along the Baghdad airport road; secret agent Nicola Calipari was killed by US Army Specialist Mario Lozano. The incident created tension between the two countries, and arguably increased the Italian public's hostility towards the United States.

== Background ==
Giuliana Sgrena had been kidnapped a month earlier, on 4 February, while working as a non-embedded journalist in Iraq for the Italian communist newspaper Il Manifesto. Some have argued she was overconfident because she thought kidnappers would only target pro-American journalists, but others counter she was fully aware of the risks.

== Rescue and incident ==
=== Sgrena's rescue ===
Sgrena was rescued in circumstances yet unclear by Italian secret-service agents from SISMI, the Italian Military Intelligence service, on 4 March 2005. One of the agents was Nicola Calipari, the other was Andrea Carpani. One unconfirmed allegation is that the Italian government paid a ransom in the range of millions of US dollars. The agents and Sgrena left by car, heading for Baghdad International Airport. The route from downtown Baghdad to the airport has been widely described as the most dangerous road in Iraq.

=== The shooting of the car ===
At around 20:55, the car Sgrena was riding in was fired upon by U.S. troops while on the way to the airport. Nicola Calipari, who had negotiated her release, was killed while allegedly protecting Giuliana Sgrena with his body. Giuliana Sgrena was hit in the shoulder.

Autopsy of Calipari's body allegedly showed that he was struck by a single bullet in the temple. Sgrena and Carpani were wounded. Sgrena was treated by US Army medics on the scene and medivaced to a US Army field hospital shortly after the incident. US Army medics also treated the injured officer on the scene, but he refused a medical evacuation for further assistance. Sgrena underwent surgery to extract shrapnel from her shoulder. The US military did not disclose their whereabouts later. Sgrena arrived in Rome a day after the fatal incident.

== Reactions ==
The incident prompted criticism from Italian government officials:

- The Italian Prime Minister at the time, Silvio Berlusconi, said: "I believe we must have an explanation for such a serious incident, for which someone must take the responsibility." Berlusconi had long been a close ally of George W. Bush. Having summoned the US ambassador to Italy, he declared "It is a pity. This was a joyful moment which made all our compatriots happy, which has been transformed into profound pain by the death of a person who behaved so bravely."
- Roberto Calderoli, the Italian Minister of Reforms, stated that several incidents had already occurred in the liberation of Giuliana Sgrena, the shooting being only the last of them.
- Mirko Tremaglia, Italian undersecretary for Foreign Affairs, said to the Italian press agency ANSA: "The Americans must be firmly reminded to respect human and civil rules."
- Gianni Alemanno, the minister of Agriculture, said: "We want the culprits to be punished, and we demand an explanation from the Americans." He added "We are faithful allies, but we must not let anyone think that we are subordinates."
- Carlo Giovanardi, Minister for the Relations with the Parliament, said he did not believe one word of the version presented by the US Army.

In response, White House press secretary Scott McClellan offered condolences stating that "we regret the loss of life" and added that "details are still unclear", and that an investigation would be conducted.

Leading figures of the Italian left-wing opposition renewed criticism of Italy's participation in the occupation of Iraq, also with support from some members of the right-wing ruling coalition:

- Romano Prodi, future Prime Minister and at the time leader of Italy's opposition coalition, stated "57 millions Italians united in waiting for Giuliana Sgrena's liberation have a right to know what happened."
- Fausto Bertinotti, leader of the Communist Refoundation Party, said that "After the extremely grave fact of Nicola Calipari's death, pulling [Italian] troops out of Iraq is an act of public sanity."
- Piero Fassino, leader of the Democrats of the Left, said that "It's not fate that pulls the trigger of a machine gun."
- Raffaele Costa, member of Parliament in Forza Italia, said on 6 March that the Parliament, due to debate an extension to the mission on 14 March, should set a clear date for withdrawal.

Tens of thousands of Italian citizens paid their respects to Calipari before the state funeral on March 8, 2005, at Santa Maria degli Angeli e dei Martiri in Rome.

The resulting strain on the political relationship between Italy and the United States is the most significant since the Cavalese cable car disaster of 1998. The case, which saw a hostage being released unharmed by Iraqi kidnappers and almost killed by American troops, strengthened the already widespread opposition to the presence of Italian troops in Iraq.

== Accounts of the incident ==
Due to the conditions in which the facts unraveled, and due to a mutually suspicious attitude of some of the involved parties, widely different accounts of the incident have been proposed.

=== Speculations on assassination attempt ===
On 6 March, Sgrena claimed that she might have been deliberately targeted, a consequence of the United States' disapproval of the means of her liberation. "The fact is that they do everything to prevent the adoption of this practice to save the lives of people held hostages, everybody knows that. So I do not see why I should rule out that I could have been the target", she told Sky TG24. The White House responded to this, denying that US troops would specifically target civilians, and stating that the zone is "a dangerous road, and it is a combat zone that our coalition forces are in. Often, they have to make split-second decisions to protect their own security". Pier Scolari said "I hope the Italian government does something because either this was an ambush, as I think, or we are dealing with imbeciles or terrorized kids who shoot at anyone".

=== American version ===
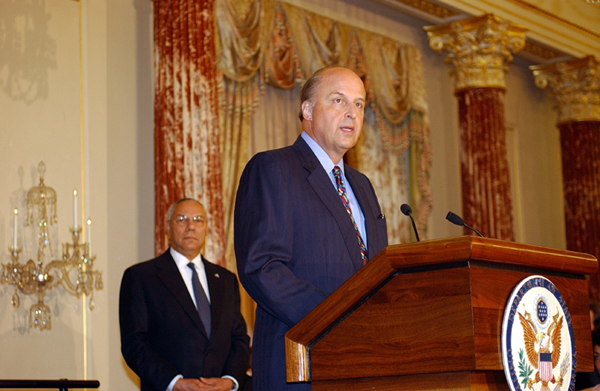
John Negroponte, then US ambassador in Iraq. His car convoy was the reason for the placement of blocking point 541.

According to initial statements from a senior U.S. military official, the car was traveling at speeds of more than 150 km/h (about 100 mph). He said that troops manning the checkpoint also claimed that car almost lost control several times before the shooting as the car hydroplaned through large puddles.

In the first few days following the incident, US spokesmen said that the Italian vehicle had been fired upon when it approached U.S. Checkpoint 504 (Camp Victory) at excessive speed, and did not slow down or stop after US troops used hand gestures, flashing lights and fired warning shots. The U.S. troops were then allegedly forced to disable the vehicle by firing into the engine block. Checkpoint 504 is a permanent roadblock.

Within the first week after the incident the version of events acknowledged by US spokesmen was significantly modified. In the second version of events, extra security patrols had recently been added to the airport route because a "senior diplomatic VIP" was going to use the road that evening; the shooting occurred at a temporary "blocking position" (not a "checkpoint"). The "senior diplomatic VIP" was later acknowledged to have been Ambassador John Negroponte, who was unable to have used helicopter transport due to bad weather.

=== Italian version ===
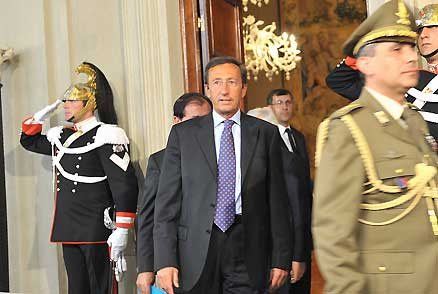
The then Italian minister of foreign affairs, Gianfranco Fini

This version of the events contrasts markedly with a version subsequently referred to the Italian Parliament by the minister of foreign affairs Gianfranco Fini.

Speaking in the Camera dei Deputati on 8 March 2005, Fini stated that there had been no roadblock, that no warning was given, that the car "was not over 40 km/h, and was illuminated from inside to facilitate control and allow phone calls to be made", that "[w]hen a strong source of light, like a projector, was turned on a few tens of meters from the car, it slowed down until it was almost stopped, and the shooting began", and that Calipari, described as one of Italy's most experienced intelligence agents with a history of successful operations in Iraq, not only had previously made "all necessary contacts" with US authorities in Baghdad and had obtained all the necessary clearances, but had also spoken to US and Italian authorities from his mobile phone just minutes before the attack.

Fini asserted that photographs taken of the car established that it was not shot at from the front (or into the engine block), as one would expect if it were approaching a checkpoint, but rather that it was shot at from the right side, with the bullets entering through that side. Fini's version of the events was also based on the testimony of a second Italian intelligence agent, who was driving the car.

He also said that the theory of a deliberate attack against Sgrena was "totally unfounded;" he finally repeated his wish that Calipari's death would not induce "unnecessary anti-US feelings" in the Italian public opinion.

=== American rebuttal ===
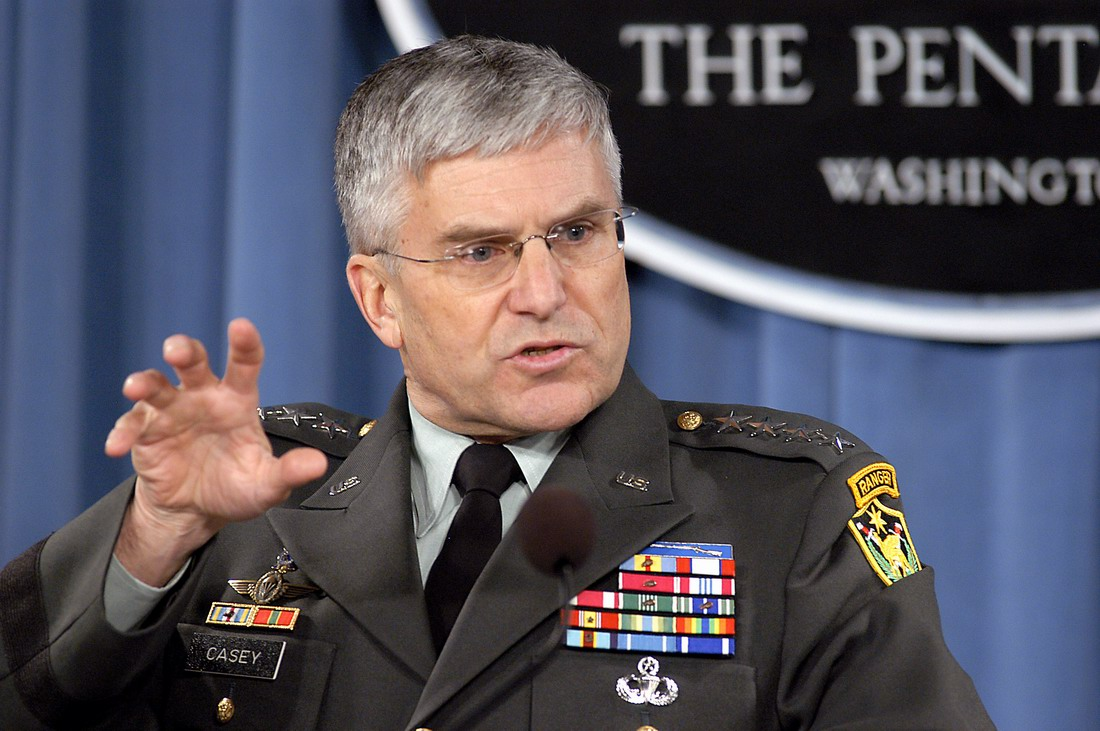
General George Casey, commander of US forces in Iraq.

The Italian version in contrast with the statements of General George Casey, commander of US forces in Iraq, who said that the Italian government had not given the US advance warning about the convoy carrying Ms Sgrena. "I personally do not have any indication of that, even on a preliminary basis", General Casey said.

General George Casey's statements are backed by General Mario Marioli, Italy's top military commander in Iraq. Marioli informed US officials that Calipari and the other Italian officer were there, but gave no information about the specifics of Calipari's operation. However, the Italian investigators' report, released 2 May 2005, claims that the American authorities were informed that Calipari was due to return to the Baghdad airport with a hostage on the night of the shooting.

Giuliana Sgrena's version of the events also only mentions the contact between Calipari and the Italian authorities, but says nothing about any contact with the American authorities whilst she was with him. US forces confiscated cell and satellite phones from the car's occupants in the immediate aftermath of the shooting, and according to the US Army's official report, gave them back before the Italians were taken from the scene. The official report also notes that "both HMMWVs involved in the blocking position were moved to transport Ms Sgrena to the Combat Support Hospital in the International Zone. Further, the scene was not deemed to be a crime scene, and efforts were made to clear the roadway." The report further concluded that the vehicle was shot while it was traveling towards the road block, not from a point perpendicular to the road, as Gianfranco Fini has insisted.

== Military reports ==
Approximate map of the incident, according to information the US and Italian reports agree upon.

Two military reports were produced, one by the US Army and one by the Italian government.

=== Release of classified information in US report ===
The Multinational Force In Iraq released an official report that was posted on its website. Classified information (such as the name of the other Sismi agent, the names of the soldiers involved, and coalition troop movements) in the report was redacted but the report was accidentally published in a form that allowed the redacted information to be easily retrieved.

The report was published in the PDF file format, and the classified sentences were covered by a black bar. However, the text below it had not been erased, and was present in the file. A copy-and-paste from the PDF reader to a word processor was sufficient to make the lines reappear.

The ability to read the complete report was quickly discovered by a Greek exchange student in Bologna, who preferred to maintain anonymous, and by Gianluca Neri, who posted the versions on his blog, Macchianera. There has been some argument about who was first out, but as Neri himself wrote, it was such a simple task that more people could well have noticed in a short time independently of each other.

=== Content of the US report ===
The US report cleared the soldiers of the 69th Infantry of any wrongdoing, claiming the unit followed proper procedures and defending the decision by one soldier, Spc. Mario Lozano, to open fire after flashing a light and firing warning shots.

The report indicated that the soldiers had already turned away about 15–30 cars before the incident, and were alert because of two warnings (BOLOs, Be On LookOut) about two possible VBIEDs (Vehicle-Borne Improvised Explosive Device), a black and a white car. The blocking position had been maintained for longer time than planned due to faulty communications procedure, which was caused by a failure of the VOIP system used by US Army; whereas FM was available, it was not used.

The spotlight and the green laser used by the US soldiers had proven effective at halting and making the previous cars turn around. Specialist Mario Lozano had first maneuvered the spotlight, and then switched to the machine gun to shoot the Italian's vehicle.

The car was estimated to travel at 50 mph (80 km/h), and it did not brake until fired upon. Eleven rounds were shot on the car, of which five hit the front.

A series of unrelated events were registered as contributing to the tragedy:

- The travel of ambassador Negroponte by car instead of by helicopter, because of bad weather;
- Communications failure between the blocking point and their headquarters;
- The daily delay of Ms Sgrena's rescue for several days;
- The Italians were not aware of the roadblock;
- The soldiers were not aware of the arrival of the Italians.

The US report did note that the unit involved in the incident had received inadequate training on how to deploy armored vehicles in blocking position before a roadblock before leaving for Iraq, and for only 10 days with another unit once it arrived.

Only one US officer, Captain Green, knew of the fact that Ms. Sgrena was being rescued, after Italian General Mario Marioli mentioned it to him. However, since Marioli added "it is best if no one knows", Green took it as an order not to pass the information on to others.

=== Italian report ===
A report by the Italian government was published by 2 May. The Italian investigators disagreed on the subjects of the speed of the car, the signaling (or lack of it) before the Americans opened fire, and the question of whether the Americans were aware of Calipari's presence and activities in Baghdad. The Italian report also noted that the Italian investigators claim that "senior US officers who arrived on the scene of the shooting had criticized the checkpoint for being poorly illuminated, inadequately signaled and badly positioned."

The Italians point that, whereas the US forces were unaware of Calipari's objectives, they were surely aware of his presence, as Calipari and Carpani were given ID badges and obtained sleeping quarters at Camp Victory. Furthermore, they claimed that the knowledge of the operation could in no way have avoided the incident, since there was no predetermined itinerary, due to the mission's nature.

It was pointed out that the officer responsible for the blocking point had not properly laid out signs and obstacles, even if the blocking point duty, after a while, clearly would not have been a short one. This left the proper functioning of the blocking point entirely on the shoulders of the two gunners, who already had with other duties, as operating the spotlight. The Americans had claimed that, since such signs are usually in Arabic and English, they would have been useless to the Italians because they would not have understood them; the Italian report considers these allegations "mildly put absurd", because words like "STOP" and "DANGER" are internationally recognized. In fact, stop signs on Italian roads have "STOP", as in English, written on them, and are identical to those used in the United States.

The "alert line" and the "warning line" were all at smaller distances that prescribed practice; the "stop line" was absent altogether. All these were approximately known to the soldiers, but there was no sign for incoming vehicles. In particular, the Alert line was just 120 m from the first military vehicle, instead of the prescribed 200–400 m. This, combined with the lack of signalling, would have forced the gunners to be alert and not get distracted for a single second throughout the 80-minute-long mission.

The only signals used were the spotlight and the green laser. The Italian report indicates that they both rely on the quick reactions of the crew operating them, and the laser is especially difficult to point on a moving target in a short time. A distraction on the gunner's side would easily transform a vehicle in a threat to be stopped by force.

The Italian report also noted the fact that the soldiers who guarded the checkpoint had placed no signs or traffic cones on the roadway indicating the presence of a checkpoint ahead, despite the fact that they were positioned around a nearly 90 degree bend in the road, which obscured the checkpoint from approaching cars: "No signs warning traffic of the presence of a US roadblock—one of the most basic precautionary measures. One of the most important rules was not respected by the soldiers manning the checkpoint."

The report also indicated that the idea behind the blocking point was inherently dangerous, as approaching vehicles were forced to turn around on a one-way highway.

The Italian investigators also faulted the US soldiers for not stringing a concertina wire barrier which could have stopped the car before reaching the roadblock, but the soldiers "didn't like to use concertina wire at night because of the danger posed by cars getting tangled up in it and requiring assistance."

Conversely, the US Army's report downplayed the absence of signs or other indicators of the roadblock's presence, arguing that they were not effective at night. However, the US Army report indicated that the roadblock unit reportedly had no signs to deploy, since at the time of "the 69th's signs—reading—'Stop or you will be shot!' were still in the shop, awaiting a technician to cover up the 'or you will be shot' phrase, deemed offensive, with tape." It is unclear whether these signs would have been used had they been available.

The Italian report specifically accuses the US forces of tampering with the crime scene, in an attempt to make a proper investigation impossible. Also, it pointed that estimates of the speed of Sgrena's car varied from 50 mph (80 km/h) to 80 mph (130 km/h), a strangely spread measurement considering that two soldiers were experienced policemen.

The Italian report also claimed that only three seconds elapsed between the warning signals from the mobile checkpoint and the time when the soldiers opened fire. They add that, despite the fact that the car was only travelling at 40 to 50 km/h, this three-second interval did not give the driver enough time to stop the car.

== Sgrena's account ==
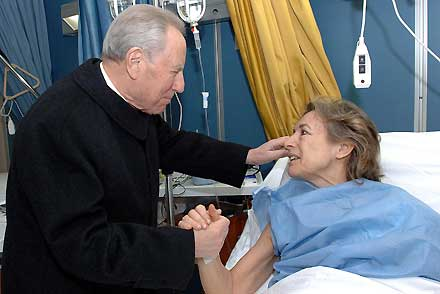
Giuliana Sgrena, still in hospital, visited by President of the Italian Republic Carlo Azeglio Ciampi on March 7.

"The shooting was not justified by the speed of the vehicle", said Giuliana Sgrena to the Italian news agency Ansa. "Our vehicle rode a normal speed which should not have induced misunderstanding", she told Il Manifesto. "It was not a checkpoint, but a patrol that fired upon us, right after having illuminated us with a projector", according to Giuliana Sgrena. The Italian agent driving the car also denied that the car was traveling at an excessive speed and refused to stop at a checkpoint: "We were driving normally. It was a patrol, in an armoured vehicle, that fired without warning."

In English-language press, claims appeared about Sgrena claiming that US soldiers and a US tank had fired on the vehicle 300 to 400 times. The 300 to 400 figure was given by Sgrena's companion in Italy, Pier Scolari, who had only talked with her on the phone. The Italian word for "tank", carro armato, did not appear in most of the Italian accounts; the term "tank" may be an erroneous translation of blindato, which means "armoured vehicle" or a HMMWV.

A fellow journalist at Il Manifesto claimed that the theory that this was murder attempt by the US forces in order to discourage further hostage-rescue attempts could not be dismissed out of hand. Sgrena claimed that her kidnappers, just before releasing her, had warned her that the American forces would be a danger to her.

Independent reporter Naomi Klein, in an interview with Amy Goodman on Democracy Now (Friday, March 25, 2005), indicated firstly that Giuliana Sgrena's injuries were too severe for her to speak, since she still had fluid in her lungs from her gunshot injuries.

Sgrena told Klein that her car was not traveling on a public road, but rather on a secured road reserved for officials, connecting the green zone directly to the airport. By virtue of being on that road, Sgrena also indicated that she must have already passed through checkpoints to enter the green zone from whence the road emerged, and that her car was driving slowly with its lights on to make it more visible and identifiable. Klein indicated that Sgrena believes that US soldiers with whom her car checked in may not have radioed ahead to mobile checkpoints to indicate that they were coming, but that they were moving away from the military unit that fired upon them, pointing that the driver, who sat in the front, is alive.

In the interview, Naomi Klein also reported that Sgrena also said that she was very disoriented while in captivity, and that her captors didn't want independent journalists in Iraq talking to the Iraqi people.

Pier Scolari, Sgrena's life partner, stated that "Giuliana had information and the US military did not want her alive". "The Americans and the Italians knew that the car was arriving." He claims that Sgrena had detailed information about the use of banned weapons during the recent operations in Fallujah (see Operation Phantom Fury). Sgrena has written about alleged use of napalm in Fallujah. Scolari went on to speculate that they were at 700 metres from the airport, which implies that they had crossed all the checkpoints. "The whole shooting was heard live by the Presidency of the Council, who was on the phone with one of the agents. Then the US military confiscated and turned off the phones", said Scolari, who was then at the Palazzo Chigi. General Casey claimed that Sgrena and Calipari's vehicle had not gone through any prior checkpoints.

== Specific findings ==
=== The checkpoint ===
The checkpoint was said to be guarded by the U.S. 10th Mountain Division, a light infantry unit, but later revealed to be a unit of the New York National Guard, which arrived in Iraq four months before the shooting and in Baghdad only one month before. The identity of the soldier who fired remained unknown until it was revealed by a Greek student at the University of Bologna, who recovered access to the censored portions of the report by saving the redacted pdf file as a text file. The soldier who fired the fatal bullet was apparently Mario Lozano, a US National Guardsman. The US is not a member of the International Criminal Court. The soldier will not be tried in a non-US court if he should face a trial. However, the fact that the soldier's name was revealed enables the Italian Investigating Magistrates (in Rome) to indict him in absentia.

The standards of US troops at checkpoints has been criticized in the past by human rights associations, and is now under scrutiny.

=== Satellite footage ===
On 28 April, CBS News released a report based on the Pentagon's analysis of an alleged time-stamped satellite footage of the incident. By measuring the distance the car traveled at 91 yards (83 m) and the time elapsed (less than three seconds), the Pentagon concluded that vehicle had to be going in excess of 60 mph (100 km/h).

However, since the Pentagon has not published the alleged footage, no independent analysis of it has been possible. The Pentagon analysts have not spoken to any news organization besides CBS News. Additionally, the definitive report, later released by the US Army, did not mention any satellite images (not even in the confidential parts, that were accidentally made available), raising questions in the Italian media about whether this footage existed at all.

While satellite coverage of Route Irish would be justified, as ambassador Negroponte was traveling on it, the Italian report claimed that weather conditions were so bad that no image could be acquired by satellites. The Italians also reported having asked for such imagery, and being told that the closest pictures available were for 2 and March, due to bad weather. The adverse weather condition was in actuality the reason why ambassador Negroponte moved by car convoy and not by helicopter, which was in turn the reason for the establishment of the blocking point, according to the US report.

=== Ballistics evidence ===
Ballistics experts commissioned by the Investigating Magistrates in Rome responsible for a criminal inquiry who examined the car in Rome came to the conclusion that the car was travelling no faster than 45 mph (60 km/h).
