= Enzo Baldoni =

Italian journalist (1948-2004)

Enzo G. Baldoni
- Born: 8 October 1948; Città di Castello, Umbria, Italy
- Disappeared: 19 August 2004 (aged 55); Najaf, Iraq
- Died: 26 August 2004 (aged 55)
- Cause of death: Execution
- Occupation: Journalist
- Employer: Diario
- Spouse: Married
- Children: Two children

Enzo G. Baldoni (8 October 1948 – 26 August 2004) was an Italian journalist working freelance and for the Italian news magazine Diario before being kidnapped and killed in captivity as captured on video by his captors. Baldoni was one of two Italians kidnapped in Iraq.

== Personal life ==
Baldoni was born in Città di Castello, Umbria. He had arrived in Baghdad a few weeks before his kidnapping and death, and also served there as a Red Cross volunteer. He was married with two children.

== Career ==
Baldoni had started his career in diverse jobs including working as a mason (in Belgium), a gymnastics professor, photographer, interpreter and laboratory technician. He then moved into advertising, working for the advertising agency Le balene colpiscono ancora ("The whales strike again"). Finally, he became a freelance journalist. He was also a translator, and was responsible for the Italian translation of Doonesbury comic strips.

== Kidnapping and death ==
He was kidnapped near Najaf, Iraq, 19 August 2004 by the Islamic Army in Iraq, an Iraqi insurgent group, allegedly linked with Al-Qaeda. His driver-interpreter was killed during the abduction. The Islamic Army released a videotape, aired on 24 August by Al Jazeera, in which it threatened to kill Baldoni unless Italian troops were withdrawn from Iraq within 48 hours. On 26 August, Al Jazeera came into possession of a videotape depicting Baldoni's murder. This videotape was not aired because of its gruesome nature. The existence of this tape is based on claims made by Al Jazeera only. Other sources claim it is only a video frame or a still shot taken with a digital camera.

Al-Jazeera did not elaborate on how or where Baldoni was killed.

== See also ==
- List of kidnappings
