= Nicola Calipari =

Italian major general and SISMI military intelligence officer (1953–2005)

- Born: June 23, 1953; Reggio Calabria, Italy
- Died: March 4, 2005 (aged 51); Route Irish, Iraq
- Spouse: 1 wife
- Relatives: 2 children
- Military career
- Allegiance: Italy
- Branch: SISMI
- Rank: Major general (generale di divisione)
- Conflicts: Rescue of Giuliana Sgrena
- Awards: Gold Medal of Military Valor

Nicola Calipari (June 23, 1953 – March 4, 2005) was an Italian major general and SISMI military intelligence officer. Calipari was accidentally killed in Iraq by American soldiers while escorting a recently released Italian hostage, journalist Giuliana Sgrena, to Baghdad International Airport.

During the 1990s, Calipari was involved in several rescues of people kidnapped by 'Ndrangheta and other criminal organizations in Italy. He had spent most of his career in the Italian police, rising to a senior position, before joining the Italian military Security and Intelligence Service (SISMI) two years before his death.

Calipari's death sparked one of the most serious diplomatic incidents between the U.S. and Italy since the end of World War II. Calipari is one of only five US or European general officers to be injured or killed during combat operations in Iraq and Afghanistan.

== Personal life ==
Calipari was born in Reggio Calabria on June 23, 1953. He is survived by his wife and two children.

== Career ==
=== Rescue of Giuliana Sgrena ===
Calipari, along with Andrea Carpani, rescued Giuliana Sgrena from her captors, in undisclosed circumstances. On the way back to Baghdad International Airport, the Toyota Corolla they were travelling in came under fire, in disputed conditions, by American soldiers that had set up a blocking position to protect the convoy transporting the American ambassador, John Negroponte.

According to the reconstruction of Giuliana Sgrena, Calipari threw himself on her, and shortly after died after being shot in his temple. A coalition report later identified the soldier who shot Calipari as New York State National Guardsman Mario Lozano, a member of the 1st Battalion of the 69th Infantry Regiment (of the Third Infantry Division).

== Death ==
=== Reactions in Italy ===
Sorrow over Calipari's death united the nation, and tens of thousands of Italians paid their respects to Calipari, who had become a national hero, at the state funeral on March 8, 2005, at Santa Maria degli Angeli e dei Martiri in Rome.

He was posthumously awarded the Gold Medal of Military Valor by President of the Italian Republic Carlo Azeglio Ciampi on March 22, 2005.

=== Video ===
On May 8, 2007, the Italian T.V. channel Canale 5 broadcast a video of the very first moments after the shooting. In this video, Calipari's car lights are switched on (while American officials said the car was travelling with lights switched off), and the car is at least 50 meters from the U.S. Army vehicle. This means that Lozano shot while the car was more than 50 meters from the vehicle, in contradiction with what Lozano said.

=== Judicial investigation ===
Italian prosecutors sought to interview Lozano as part of their criminal investigation into Calipari's death.

On December 22, 2005, the special prosecutors of the Magistrate's Service of Rome announced that they were considering charging Lozano with voluntary manslaughter.

On January 18, 2006, it was reported that the prosecutors had decided to charge Lozano with murder. The prosecutors indicated that despite making over twenty formal requests to the United States, they refused to formally identify Lozano. After confirming Lozano's identity, the Magistrate service appointed an attorney to represent Lozano during the charging process, with Lozano facing trial in absentia in the event of a failure to accept service of process and non-appearance at trial.

On February 7, 2007, it was reported that Judge Sante Spinaci had agreed to allow the trial in absentia to move forward, with the trial beginning on April 17.

On October 25, 2007, an Italian court dismissed the charges against Lozano after determining that coalition forces in Iraq were under the exclusive jurisdiction of the country that sent them.

=== Political implications ===
Calipari's death sparked one of the most serious diplomatic incidents between the U.S. and Italy since the end of World War II. Other such incidents include the Sigonella crisis, the Cavalese cable car disaster in 1998, the Gladio scandal and the abduction of Islamic cleric Hassan Mustafa Osama Nasr in 2003 (Abu Omar case).

Calipari, a highly decorated SISMI agent, had become a national hero in Italy. As a result, there was significant pressure on the Italian government to publicly support another investigation into the shooting, this time being conducted by prosecutors.

Italy's Prime Minister Silvio Berlusconi indicated in Parliament on May 5, 2005, that the government remains fully committed to supporting the ongoing judicial investigation into Calipari's death. One of the most prominent leaders of the opposition in the lower house of parliament, Piero Fassino, called for the United States to facilitate cooperation with the investigation, indicating that they believe the U.S. Army should produce Lozano for questioning by the magistrates.

Alfonso Pecoraro Scanio, head of the Italian Federation of the Greens, indicated that should the United States fail to cooperate with this investigation by allowing Lozano to be questioned, he would push for a hearing at the International Court of Justice.
