= Giuliana Sgrena =

Italian journalist (born 1948)

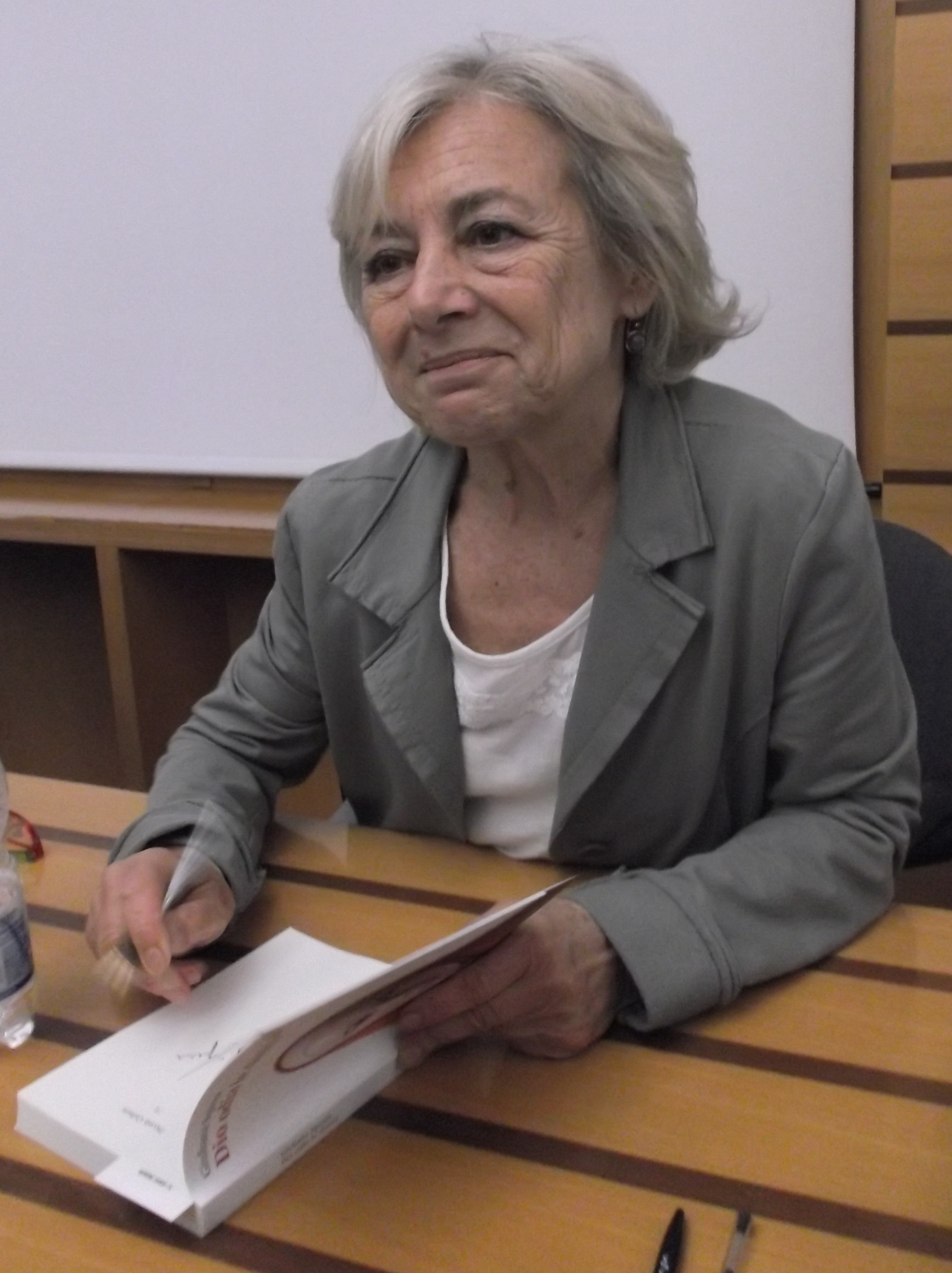
- Sgrena in 2016
- Born: December 20, 1948 (age 77); Masera, Province of Verbano-Cusio-Ossola, Italy

Giuliana Sgrena (born 20 December 1948) is an Italian journalist who works for the Italian communist newspaper il manifesto and the German weekly Die Zeit. While working in Iraq, she was kidnapped by insurgents on 4 February 2005. After her release on 4 March, Sgrena and the two Italian intelligence officers who had helped secure her release came under fire from U.S. forces while on their way to Baghdad International Airport. Nicola Calipari, a major general in the Italian Military Intelligence and Security Service (SISMI) was killed, and Sgrena and Andrea Carpani, the other Italian officer taking her to the airport, were wounded in the incident. The event caused an international outcry.

== Background and career ==
Giuliana Sgrena was born and raised in Masera, Province of Verbano-Cusio-Ossola, a town of fewer than 1,000 people that had seen intense fighting during World War II between Italian partisans and German soldiers. Her father, Franco Sgrena, was a noted partisan during the war and later became an activist in the communist railway union.

Sgrena studied in Milan where she became involved in leftist politics. She became a professed pacifist and from 1980 worked for Guerra e Pace, a weekly publication edited by Michelangelo Notarianni. In 1988, she joined the communist paper Il Manifesto and, as a war correspondent, has since covered conflicts such as the Algerian Civil War, the Somali and the Afghanistan conflicts. During her travels, she reported extensively on topics from the Horn of Africa, the Maghreb and the Middle East.

As a campaigner for women's rights, she has been particularly concerned with the conditions of women under Islam. About this topic she wrote Alla scuola dei Taleban ("At the Taliban's school"). She opposed the 2003 invasion of Iraq. At the start of the war, she went to Baghdad to cover the bombing of that city, for which work she was awarded the title Cavaliere del Lavoro on her return to Italy.

== Kidnapping ==
Sgrena was kidnapped outside Baghdad University by gunmen in February 2005. In an article from March 2003 she had spoken openly about her concern for the security situation in Baghdad and her fear of being kidnapped. Anti-globalization activist Naomi Klein reported that Sgrena was "fully aware" of but willing to take "tremendous risks" in order to document the war.

Sgrena defended her decision to risk being kidnapping as a necessary part of working as an unembedded reporter in a warzone. She points to her reporting on such critical incidents as the Second Battle of Fallujah, where, she argues, only unembedded reporters were able to report the level of destruction in the city and the ferocity of urban warfare, which according to her included the use of napalm.

She was later shown in a video pleading that the demands of her kidnappers, the withdrawal of Italian troops from Iraq, be fulfilled. Her release was subsequently negotiated and she was freed on 4 March 2005. Italy allegedly paid $US6 million in ransom for her release.

=== Rescue ===
After being rescued by Nicola Calipari and another SISMI agent, Sgrena was being transported by car to Baghdad International Airport. However, a roadblock, put in place to protect John Negroponte's car convoy, fired on the vehicle, causing the death of Calipari, and wounding Sgrena and the other agent, Andrea Carpani. Sgrena testified that US forces fired on the car without warning, and this incident caused strain in diplomatic relations between Italy and the United States. The U.S. soldiers claimed that they were duped into firing on the vehicle by an Al-Qaeda agent's false lead that a bomb was in the vehicle carrying Sgrena.

Sgrena has contradicted the US claims and has insisted that no warnings were given before the soldiers shot at their car. Sgrena said that out of 58 bullets fired at the car, 57 were fired at the passenger and only the last bullet was fired at the engine, which shows that the intention was not to stop the car.

== Aftermath ==
Sgrena was awarded the Stuttgart peace prize in 2005. In a November 2005 RAI documentary, Fallujah, The Hidden Massacre, Sgrena declared that the U.S. had used white phosphorus and napalm in Fallujah during Operation Phantom Fury.

On 26 June 2006, Sgrena offered to meet with Mario Lozano, the US National Guardsman who had shot at her car.

== Selected works ==
- "Alla scuola dei taleban", Editore Manifestolibri (collana Talpa di biblioteca), 2002.
- "Il fronte Iraq. Diario di una guerra permanente", Editore Manifestolibri (collana Talpa di biblioteca), 2004.
- "Fuoco amico", Editore Feltrinelli (collana Serie bianca), 2005.
- "Il prezzo del velo. La guerra dell'Islam contro le donne", Editore Feltrinelli (collana Serie bianca) 2008.
