= Francesco Amirante =

Italian magistrate (1933–2024)

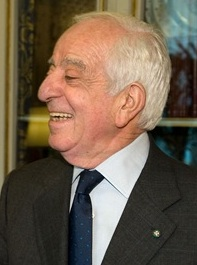
- Amirante in 2010

President of the Constitutional Court
- In office 25 February 2009 – 7 December 2010
- Preceded by: Giovanni Maria Flick
- Succeeded by: Ugo De Siervo

Judge of the Constitutional Court
- In office 7 December 2001 – 7 December 2010
- Preceded by: Fernando Santosuosso
- Succeeded by: Giorgio Lattanzi

Personal details
- Born: 16 April 1933 Naples, Italy
- Died: 6 January 2024 (aged 90) Naples, Italy
- Education: University of Naples Federico II
- Occupation: Magistrate

Francesco Amirante (16 April 1933 – 6 January 2024) was an Italian magistrate. He served on the Constitutional Court from 2001 to 2010 and was its President from 2009 to 2010.

Amirante died in Naples on 6 January 2024, at the age of 90.
