= Mario Rosario Morelli =

Italian judge (born 1941)

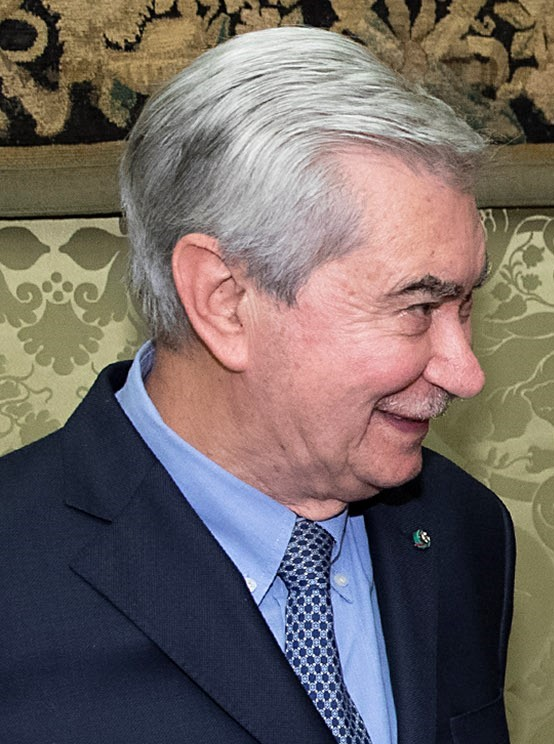

President of the Constitutional Court of Italy
- In office 16 September 2020 – 12 December 2020
- Preceded by: Marta Cartabia
- Succeeded by: Giancarlo Coraggio

Vice President of the Constitutional Court of Italy
- In office 8 March 2018 – 16 September 2020
- President: Giorgio Lattanzi; Marta Cartabia

Judge of the Constitutional Court of Italy
- In office 12 December 2011 – 12 December 2020
- Appointed by: Court of Cassation

Personal details
- Born: 15 May 1941 (age 85) Rome, Italy
- Education: University of Naples Federico II
- Profession: Magistrate

Mario Rosario Morelli (born 15 May 1941) is an Italian judge. He was Judge of the Constitutional Court of Italy between 12 December 2011 and 12 December 2020, and served as its president from 16 September 2020.

== Career ==
Morelli was born in Rome on 15 May 1941. He was a President of Section of the Court of Cassation before being appointed to the Constitutional Court by the Court of Cassation on 18 November 2011. He was sworn in on 12 December 2011.

When Giorgio Lattanzi became President of the Court on 8 March 2018, he named Morelli Vice President. He was confirmed in this position by President Marta Cartabia on 11 December 2019. On 16 September 2020, Morelli became president; he was elected in the second round of voting with nine votes, while Giancarlo Coraggio obtained five and Giuliano Amato received one. As first act in office he made both Coraggio and Amato Vice President. His term in office ended on 12 December 2020.

Legal offices
Preceded by Marta Cartabia	President of the Constitutional Court of Italy; 2020	Succeeded by Giancarlo Coraggio
