= Cesare Ruperto =

Italian judge (1925–2026)

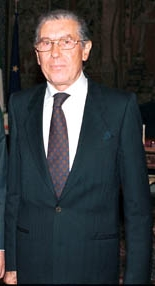
- Ruperto in 2001

President of the Constitutional Court of Italy
- In office 5 January 2001 – 2 December 2002
- Preceded by: Cesare Mirabelli
- Succeeded by: Riccardo Chieppa

Justice of the Constitutional Court of Italy
- In office 2 December 1993 – 2 December 2002
- Preceded by: Francesco Greco
- Succeeded by: Alfio Finocchiaro

Personal details
- Born: 28 May 1925 Filadelfia, Kingdom of Italy
- Died: 5 February 2026 (aged 100) Rome, Italy
- Education: Sapienza University of Rome
- Occupation: Judge

Cesare Ruperto (28 May 1925 – 5 February 2026) was an Italian judge who served as a member of the Constitutional Court from 1993 to 2002 and was its president from 2001 to 2002.

Ruperto died in Rome on 5 February 2026, at the age of 100.
