= Annibale Marini =

Italian judge (1940–2025)

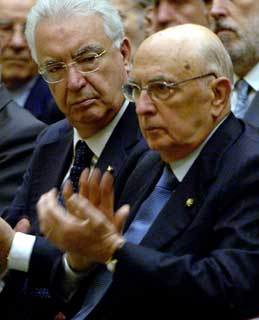
- Marini (left) with Italian President Giorgio Napolitano

President of the Constitutional Court of Italy
- In office 10 November 2005 – 9 July 2006
- Preceded by: Piero Alberto Capotosti
- Succeeded by: Franco Bile

Judge of the Constitutional Court of Italy
- In office 9 July 1997 – 9 July 2006

Member of the High Council of the Judiciary
- In office 31 July 2010 – 25 September 2014

Personal details
- Born: 5 December 1940 Catanzaro, Italy
- Died: 5 November 2025 (aged 84) Rome, Italy
- Political party: Independent
- Children: Francesco Saverio Marini
- Education: Sapienza University of Rome
- Occupation: Judge

Annibale Marini (5 December 1940 – 5 November 2025) was an Italian judge. He served as a member and president of the Constitutional Court from 1997 to 2006 and 2005 to 2006, respectively.

Marini died in Rome on 5 November 2025, at the age of 84.
