= Giuseppe Tesauro =

Italian jurist (1942–2021)

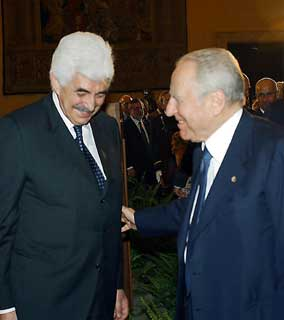
- Tesauro (left) with Italian President Ciampi in 2003

President of the Constitutional Court of Italy
- In office 30 July 2014 – 8 November 2014
- Preceded by: Gaetano Silvestri
- Succeeded by: Alessandro Criscuolo

Judge of the Constitutional Court of Italy
- In office 9 November 2005 – 8 November 2014
- Appointed by: President of Italy

President of the Italian Competition Authority
- In office 12 March 1998 – 16 February 2005
- Preceded by: Giuliano Amato
- Succeeded by: Antonio Catricalà

Advocate General of the European Court of Justice
- In office 7 October 1988 – 4 March 1998

Personal details
- Born: 15 November 1942 Naples, Italy
- Died: 7 July 2021 (aged 78) Naples, Italy
- Resting place: Campo Verano
- Education: University of Naples Federico II

Giuseppe Tesauro (15 November 1942 – 7 July 2021) was an Italian jurist. He served as Advocate General at the European Court of Justice from 1988 until 1998. Tesauro was President of the Italian Competition Authority between 1998 and 2005. He subsequently was a judge at the Constitutional Court of Italy from 2005 until 2014, serving as its President from July 2014 until the end of his term.

== Career ==
Tesauro was born in Naples. He graduated with a degree in law from the University of Naples Federico II in 1964. He became qualified to work as a lawyer and worked for the legal service of the Ministry of Foreign Affairs. Tesauro was named a lecturer of international law at the University of Messina in 1969. He became professor international law in 1972 and continued until 1975. He then held the same position at the University of Naples Federico II from 1975 to 1981. From 1982 until 1994 he led the international law department of the Sapienza University of Rome.

Tesauro served as Advocate General at the European Court of Justice from 7 October 1988 until 4 March 1998. He was subsequently appointed President of the Italian Competition Authority. He held this office from 12 March 1998 until 16 February 2005.

Tesauro was appointed to the Constitutional Court by Italian President Carlo Azeglio Ciampi on 4 November 2005, and he was sworn in on 9 November 2005. Tesauro was elected President of the Constitutional Court on 30 July 2014, receiving 7 votes in favour and 6 votes against. He served until 8 November 2014.

From 31 March 2016 to 2018 he was the Chairman of Banca Carige.

Tesauro died on 7 July 2021 at the age of 78.
