= Alfonso Quaranta =

Italian magistrate (1936–2023)

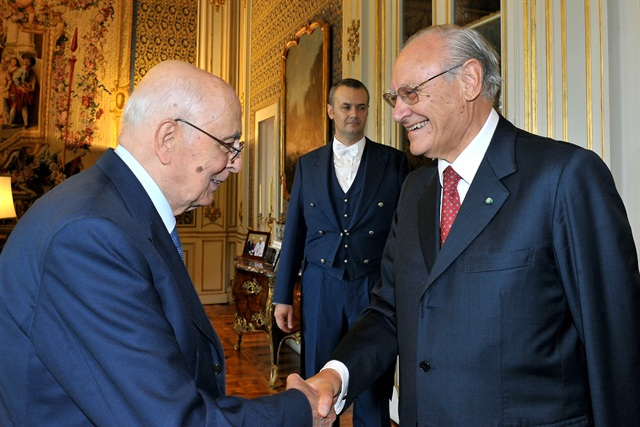
- Quaranta (right) in 2011

President of the Constitutional Court of Italy
- In office 6 June 2011 – 27 January 2013
- Preceded by: Ugo De Siervo
- Succeeded by: Franco Gallo

Judge of the Constitutional Court of Italy
- In office 27 January 2004 – 27 January 2013
- Preceded by: Riccardo Chieppa
- Succeeded by: Giancarlo Coraggio

Personal details
- Born: 2 January 1936 Naples, Italy
- Died: 6 March 2023 (aged 87) Rome, Italy
- Education: University of Naples Federico II
- Occupation: Magistrate

Alfonso Quaranta (2 January 1936 – 6 March 2023) was an Italian magistrate. He served as President of the Constitutional Court of Italy from 2011 to 2013.

Quaranta died in Rome on 6 March 2023, at the age of 87.
