= Marta Cartabia =

Italian judge (born 1963)

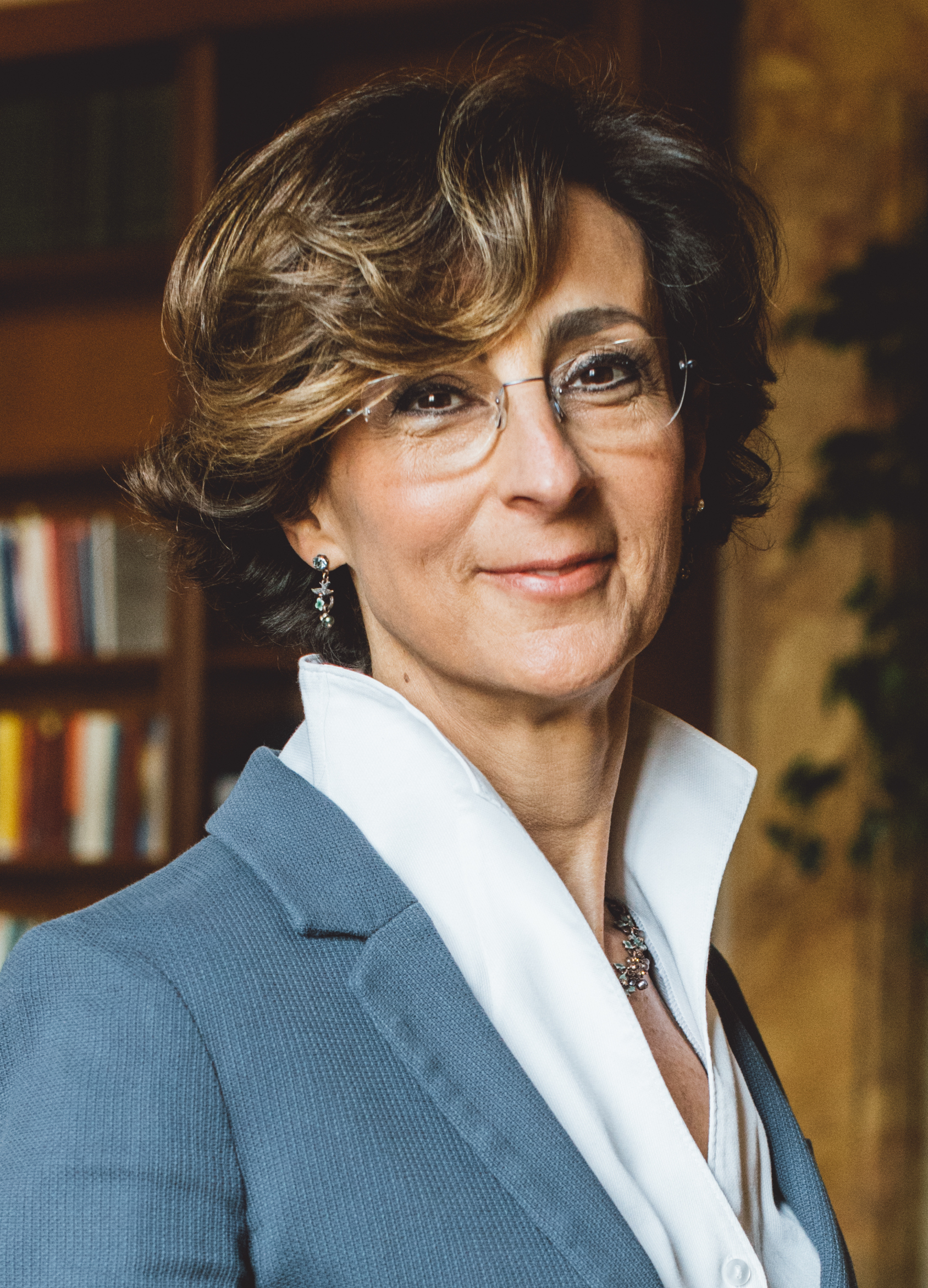
- Cartabia in 2017

Minister of Justice
- In office 13 February 2021 – 22 October 2022
- Prime Minister: Mario Draghi
- Preceded by: Alfonso Bonafede
- Succeeded by: Carlo Nordio

President of the Constitutional Court
- In office 11 December 2019 – 13 September 2020
- Preceded by: Giorgio Lattanzi
- Succeeded by: Mario Rosario Morelli

Judge of the Constitutional Court
- In office 13 September 2011 – 13 September 2020
- Appointed by: Giorgio Napolitano
- Preceded by: Maria Rita Saulle
- Succeeded by: Emanuela Navarretta

Personal details
- Born: 14 May 1963 (age 63) San Giorgio su Legnano, Italy
- Party: Independent
- Education: University of Milan; European University Institute; Aix-Marseille University

Marta Cartabia (Italian pronunciation: [ˈmarta karˈtaːbja]; born 14 May 1963) is an Italian jurist and academic who served as Minister of Justice in the national unity government of Prime Minister Mario Draghi. Cartabia previously was Judge of the Constitutional Court of Italy between 2011 and 2020, Vice President from 12 November 2014 to 11 December 2019 and President from 11 December 2019 to 13 September 2020.

The Cartabia Reform of Italy's criminal justice, approved in November 2021, is named after her. She is a professor of constitutional law. She was the first woman to hold the office of President of the Constitutional Court and became President of Council of Europe's Venice Commission in December 2025.

== Early life and education ==
Cartabia was born in San Giorgio su Legnano, near Milan, in 1963. In 1987, she graduated with honours at the University of Milan, with the thesis "Does a European Constitution exist?" with professor Valerio Onida as her supervisor. She obtained a Ph.D. in law from the European University Institute in Florence in 1993.

== Career ==
Cartabia worked at the Constitutional Court of Italy as a clerk between 1993 and 1996. In 2005, she was employed by the University of Milano-Bicocca as professor of the Jean Monnet Course of European Constitutional Law. Between 2006 and 2010, she worked as an independent expert for the European Union Agency for Fundamental Rights (FRA) in Vienna. For the academic year 2009–2010 Cartabia was a Straus Fellow at "The Straus Institute for the Advanced Study of Law & Justice" in New York City.

=== Constitutional Judge ===
Cartabia was appointed as judge on the Constitutional Court by Italian President Giorgio Napolitano on 2 September 2011, and sworn into office on 13 September 2011. At the time of her appointment, she was one of the youngest appointees ever, and only the third woman in history. Cartabia succeeded Maria Rita Saulle, who had died in office. She was appointed Vice President of the Court on 12 November 2014.

In December 2017, Cartabia was appointed as a substitute member for Italy to the European Commission for Democracy through Law of the Council of Europe, also known as Venice Commission. On 11 December 2019, Cartabia succeeded Giorgio Lattanzi as President of the Constitutional Court, becoming the first woman to hold the position. Cartabia received all 14 votes. Cartabia's term in office ended on 13 September 2020. She was succeeded as president by Mario Rosario Morelli and as Judge by Emanuela Navarretta.

=== Minister of Justice ===
On 13 February 2021, Cartabia became Minister of Justice in the Draghi government, succeeding Alfonso Bonafede. Cartabia was the third woman after Paola Severino and Annamaria Cancellieri to hold this position. On 28 April, she obtained the extradition to Italy of seven former left-wing terrorists of the Years of Lead who had found protection in France due to the Mitterrand doctrine. On 8 July 2021, the Council of Ministers launched the reform of the criminal justice system, spearheaded by Cartabia herself, in collaboration with commission of experts chaired by the former President of the Constitutional Court Giorgio Lattanzi. In November 2021, the reform of the Italian civil procedure was also approved by Parliament. These reforms were important in order to obtain European post-COVID-19 recovery funds (Next Generation EU). As Minister of Justice, she was in favour of the implementation of alternatives to imprisonment, such as semi-release, home detention, community service, and fines for those given a sentence up to four years.

=== Other activities ===
On 11 September 2021, Cartabia was appointed by Pope Francis as an ordinary member of the Pontifical Academy of Social Sciences. She was later appointed as a member of the Section for fundamental questions of the Dicastery for Evangelization. Starting in April 2023, she became a member of the board of directors of the Agnelli Foundation. She is also a member of the Ethic and Integrity Research Commission in the National Research Council. In December 2025, Cartabia was elected as president of Venice Commission of the Council of Europe.

== Recognition ==
Cartabia was made Knight Grand Cross in the Order of Merit of the Italian Republic on 24 October 2011.

== Writings ==
- Marta Cartabia; Andrea Simoncini (2015). Pope Benedict XVI's legal thought : a dialogue on the foundation of law. New York: Cambridge University Press. doi:10.1017/CBO9781316106303. ISBN 9781316106303. OCLC 1008627286.
- Marta Cartabia; Andrea Simoncini (2013). La legge di re Salomone : ragione e diritto nei discorsi di Benedetto XVI. Biblioteca Universale Rizzoli Saggi (in Italian). Milan. p. 256. ISBN 9788817069878. OCLC 856902230.
- Marta Cartabia; Andrea Simoncini (2009). La sostenibilità della democrazia nel XXI secolo. Percorsi (in Italian). Bologna: Il Mulino. p. 351. ISBN 978-8815133724. OCLC 515405613. Archived from the original on 18 December 2019.
- Aldo Bardusco; Marta Cartabia; Micaela Frulli (8–9 February 2007). Immunità costituzionali e crimini internazionali : atti del convegno (in Italian). Vol. 1 vol. Milan: Giuffrè. pp. X-295. ISBN 978-8814140389. OCLC 690390197.
- * Marta Cartabia; Marilena Gennusa (2008). La fonti europee e il diritto italiano. Costituzione e società. Poteri (in Italian). Turino: Giappichelli. p. 121. ISBN 978-8834896808. OCLC 868542938.

Legal offices
| Preceded by Maria Rita Saulle | Judge of the Constitutional Court of Italy; 2011–2020 | Succeeded by Emanuela Navarretta |
| Preceded by Giorgio Lattanzi | President of the Constitutional Court of Italy; 2019–2020 | Succeeded by Mario Rosario Morelli |
Political offices
| Preceded by Alfonso Bonafede | Minister of Justice; 2021–2022 | Succeeded by Carlo Nordio |
