= Stefano Petitti =

Italian judge

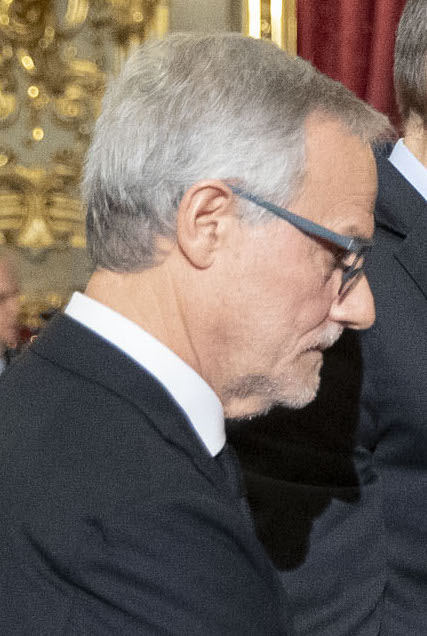

Judge of the Constitutional Court of Italy
- Incumbent
- Assumed office 10 December 2019
- Appointed by: Court of Cassation
- Preceded by: Giorgio Lattanzi

Personal details
- Born: 2 September 1953 (age 73) Rome, Italy
- Education: Sapienza University of Rome
- Profession: Judge

Stefano Petitti (born 2 September 1953) is an Italian judge. He has been a Judge of the Constitutional Court of Italy since 10 December 2019.

Petitti was born in Rome. He was elected to the Constitutional Court by the Court of Cassation on 28 November 2019, having won the election against advocate general Luigi Salvato. At the time of his election, Petitti served as president of the second civil section of the Court of Cassation. He succeeded Giorgio Lattanzi as judge on the Constitutional Court. Petitti was sworn in on 10 December 2019.
