= Chieppa =

Chieppa is an Italian surname. Notable people with the surname include:

- Riccardo Chieppa (1926–2025), Italian magistrate
- Stefania Chieppa (born 1983), Italian tennis player
