= Paciotti =

Paciotti is an Italian surname. Notable people with the surname include:

- Cesare Paciotti (1958–2025), Italian shoe designer
- Elena Ornella Paciotti (born 1941), Italian politician and magistrate
- Larry Paciotti (born 1959), American director
