= Caianiello =

Caianiello is an Italian surname. Notable people with the surname include:

- Vincenzo Caianiello (1932–2002), Italian jurist
- Eduardo R. Caianiello (1921–1993), Italian physicist
- Andrea Caianiello (born 1987) Italian rower
