= Vladimiro Zagrebelsky =

Italian jurist (1940–2025)

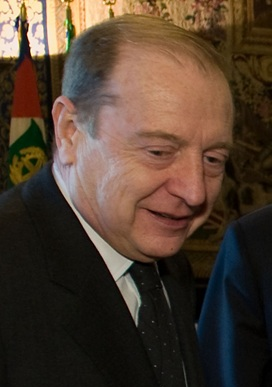
- Zagrebelsky in 2011

Justice of the European Court of Human Rights
- In office 25 April 2001 – 1 May 2010

Councilor of the High Council of the Judiciary
- In office 1994–1998
- In office 1981–1985

Personal details
- Born: 25 March 1940 Turin, Italy
- Died: 5 August 2025 (aged 85) Gressoney-La-Trinité, Italy
- Party: Independent
- Education: University of Turin
- Occupation: Jurist

Vladimiro Zagrebelsky (25 March 1940 – 5 August 2025) was an Italian jurist. The brother of Gustavo Zagrebelsky, he served on the High Council of the Judiciary from 1981 to 1985 and again from 1994 to 1998 and was a justice of the European Court of Human Rights from 2001 to 2010.

Zagrebelsky died in Gressoney-La-Trinité on 5 August 2025, at the age of 85.
