= Paolo Grossi =

Paolo Grossi may refer to

- Paolo Grossi (judge) (1933–2022), Italian judge
- Paolo Grossi (footballer) (born 1981), Italian footballer
