= Antonella Sciarrone Alibrandi =

Italian jurist and magistrate (born 1965)

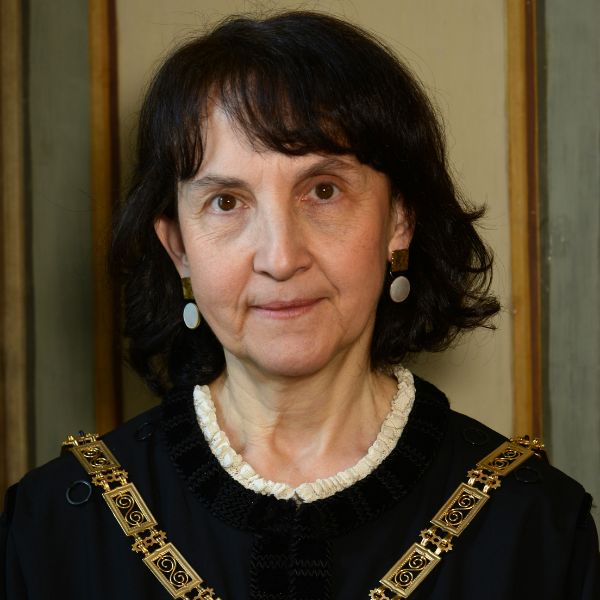

Judge of the Constitutional Court of Italy
- Incumbent
- Assumed office 14 November 2023
- Appointed by: President of Italy

Under-Secretary of the Dicastery for Culture and Education
- In office 25 November 2022 – 14 November 2023

Personal details
- Born: 2 May 1965 (age 61) Milan, Italy
- Party: Independent
- Children: 3
- Education: Università Cattolica del Sacro Cuore; University of Ferrara

Antonella Sciarrone Alibrandi (born 2 May 1965) is an Italian jurist, professor and magistrate. She has been judge of the Constitutional Court of Italy since 2023 and previously served at the Dicastery for Culture and Education of the Holy See.

== Early life and education ==
Sciarrone Alibrando was born on 2 May 1965 in Milan, Italy. She got a degree in law in 1987 and got a PhD in civil law from the University of Ferrara in 1992.

== Career ==
In 1992, she began her academic career at the Università Cattolica del Sacro Cuore, where she has been a professor of economic law since 2002 and has also served as vice-rector between 2017 and 2022 and head of department. Between 1992 and 2002, she was a lecturer at the University of Bologna. In addition, Sciarrone Alibrandi practised as a lawyer, served as a member of the Bank of Italy’s Banking and Financial Arbitration Board and at the National Observatory against Extortion and Usury, established within the Ministry of the Interior, and has acted as an expert witness in national and international litigation concerning banking and financial law.

She has also participated in national and international bodies relating to banking and financial law and financial innovation, including the European Commission, the European Banking Institute and the Vatican’s Supervisory and Financial Information Authority, where was named in June 2020 by Pope Francis. She was also member of the Pontifical Council for Culture. Between 2022 and 2023 Sciarrone Alibrande served as under-secretary of the Dicastery for Culture and Education, and was appointed consultant to that dicastery in March 2024.

By a decree dated 6 November 2023, published on the 10 November, the President of Italy, Sergio Mattarella, appointed her, alongside Giovanni Pitruzzella, as a judge of the Constitutional Court of Italy; she was sworn in on 14 November at the Quirinal Palace by president Mattarella.

== Personal life ==
She is married and has three children.
