= Giancarlo Coraggio =

Italian judge

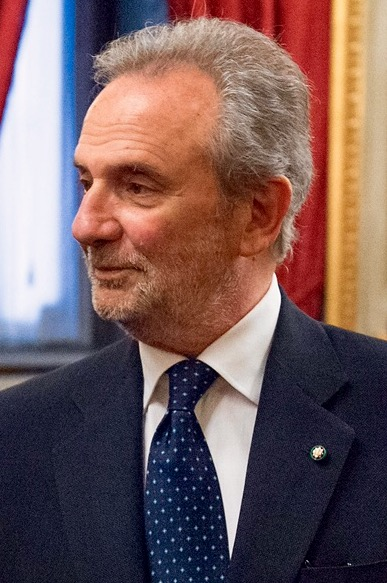
- Giancarlo Coraggio

President of the Constitutional Court of Italy
- In office 18 December 2020 – 28 January 2022
- Preceded by: Mario Rosario Morelli
- Succeeded by: Giuliano Amato

Vice President of the Constitutional Court
- In office 16 September 2020 – 18 December 2020
- President: Mario Rosario Morelli

Judge of the Constitutional Court of Italy
- In office 28 January 2013 – 28 January 2022
- Appointed by: Italian Council of State

President of the Italian Council of State
- In office 7 February 2012 – 27 January 2013
- Preceded by: Pasquale De Lise
- Succeeded by: Giorgio Giovannini

Personal details
- Born: 16 December 1940 (age 85) Naples, Italy

Giancarlo Coraggio (born 16 December 1940) is an Italian magistrate. He has been Judge of the Constitutional Court of Italy from 28 January 2013 to 28 January 2022 and President of the Constitutional Court from 18 December 2020 to 28 January 2022. Previously he served as President of the Italian Council of State.

== Career ==
Coraggio was born in Naples. Coraggio worked as a magistrate between 1965 and 1969, and served as an assistant general prosecutor for the Court of Auditors between 1969 and 1975. He later became President of the Regional Administrative Court of first Marche and later Campania. Coraggio also served as section president on the Italian Council of State. He was appointed by the Sports Justice Commission as president of the Federal Justice Court on 16 October 2007.

Coraggio was President of the Italian Council of State between 7 February 2012 and 27 January 2013. He was appointed to the Constitutional Court by the Council of State on 29 November 2012. He was sworn in on 23 January 2013. After the end of term of Marta Cartabia as President of the Constitutional Court, Coraggio ran for the position. He was defeated by Mario Rosario Morelli, who after two rounds of voting obtained nine votes, while Coraggio received five and Giuliano Amato received one. Morelli subsequently named Coraggio Vice President on 16 September 2020. On 18 December 2020, after Morelli's term in office ended, Coraggio was elected President of the Italian Constitutional Court, receiving the unanimity of votes by the member judges. He will hold this position until 22 January 2022. As his first act, Coraggio confirmed Amato in the role of vice president of the court.

Coraggio was made Knight Grand Cross in the Order of Merit of the Italian Republic on 27 December 1996.

Legal offices
Preceded by Pasquale De Lise	President of the Italian Council of State; 2012–2013	Succeeded by Giorgio Giovannini
Preceded by Mario Rosario Morelli	President of the Italian Constitutional Court; 2020–2022	Succeeded by Giuliano Amato
