= Gustavo Zagrebelsky =

Italian judge and constitutionalist (born 1943)

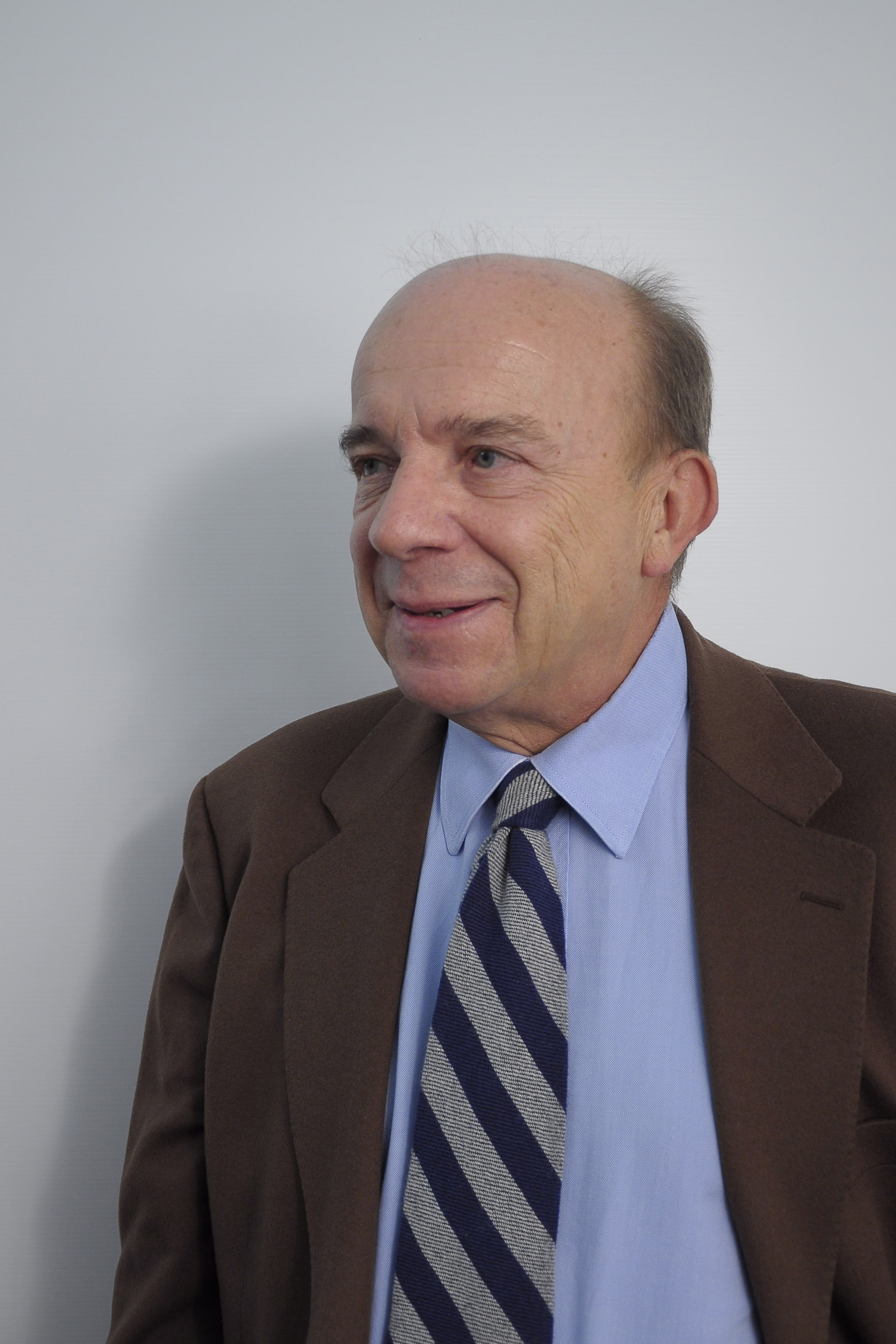

President of the Constitutional Court of Italy
- In office 28 January 2004 – 13 September 2004
- Preceded by: Riccardo Chieppa
- Succeeded by: Valerio Onida

Judge of the Constitutional Court of Italy
- In office 13 September 1995 – 13 September 2004
- Appointed by: Oscar Luigi Scalfaro

Personal details
- Born: 1 June 1943 (age 83) San Germano Chisone, Kingdom of Italy
- Education: University of Turin

Gustavo Zagrebelsky (Italian pronunciation: [ɡuˈstaːvo ddzaɡreˈbɛlski]; born 1 June 1943) is an Italian judge and constitutionalist.

Zagrebelsky was born in San Germano Chisone, brother of Vladimiro Zagrebelsky, judge at the European Court of Human Rights. He was appointed as a judge on Constitutional Court of Italy by the President of Italy on 9 September 1995, swearing on his honour on 13 September 1995. He was elected President of the Italian Constitutional Court on 28 January 2004 and ceased his President office on 13 September of the same year.
