= Maria Rosaria San Giorgio =

Italian magistrate (born 1952)

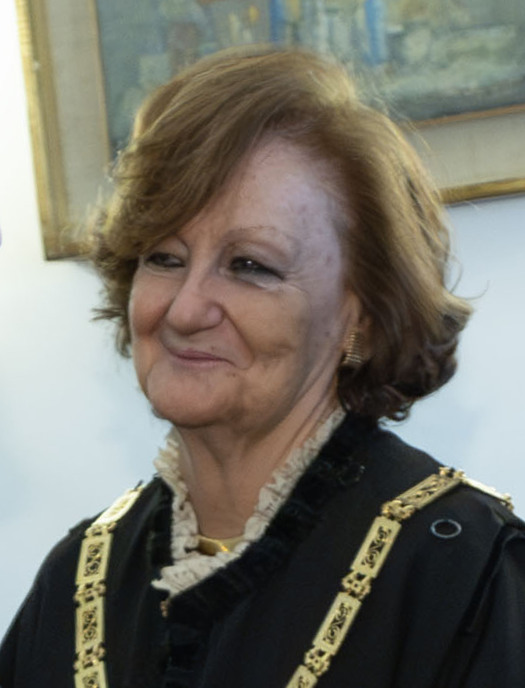

Judge of the Constitutional Court of Italy
- Incumbent
- Assumed office 17 December 2020
- Appointed by: Court of Cassation

Member of the High Council of the Judiciary
- In office 30 September 2014 – 27 September 2018

Personal details
- Born: 16 July 1952 (age 74) Naples, Italy
- Party: Independent
- Education: University of Naples Federico II
- Profession: Magistrate

Maria Rosaria San Giorgio (born 16 July 1952) is an Italian magistrate, Judge of the Constitutional Court of Italy since 2020.

== Biography ==
Graduated with a thesis in constitutional law in 1974, San Giorgio was councilor of the prefecture for five years, then moved on to the Government Commissariat for the region Emilia-Romagna. She was appointed as a judicial auditor in 1981 and subsequently served as a prosecutor. Not long after, she was a study assistant at the Constitutional Court of Italy.

She was a member of the board of directors of the Supreme Court of Cassation from 2008 to 2012, of the Board of Arbitrators of the National Association of Magistrates, of the commission for the reform of the Code of Ethics of the Judiciary, as well as of the Board of Directors of the Specialization School for the legal professions at the LUMSA University.

She taught civil law at the Graduate School of Legal Professions at La Sapienza University of Rome and collaborated with the chair of criminal procedure at the LUISS Guido Carli.

She was the only woman magistrate in the 2014-2018 council of the High Council of the Judiciary. As a member of the Unicost current, she is considered a conservative magistrate.

On 16 December, San Giorgio was appointed Judge of the Constitutional Court of Italy by the Supreme Court of Cassation. She is the first woman to be chosen as a Judge of the Constitutional Court of Italy as a magistrate of a higher jurisdiction by the Court of Cassation.
