= Emanuela Navarretta =

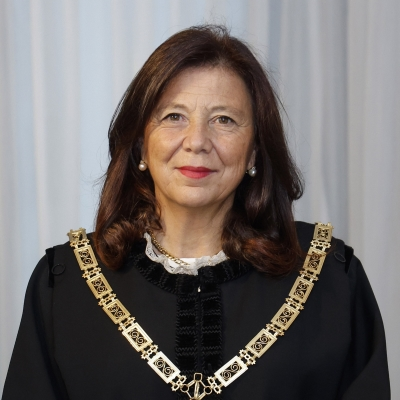

Judge of the Constitutional Court of Italy
- Incumbent
- Assumed office 15 September 2020
- Appointed by: Sergio Mattarella
- Preceded by: Marta Cartabia

Personal details
- Born: 3 January 1966 (age 60) Campobasso, Italy
- Education: Sant'Anna School of Advanced Studies; University of Pisa
- Profession: Academic, lawyer

Emanuela Navarretta (born 3 January 1966) is an Italian jurist, Judge of the Constitutional Court of Italy since 2020.

== Biography ==
Born in Campobasso, Navarretta lived in Rome until 1984, when she won the national competition for admission to the Sant'Anna School of Advanced Studies in Pisa, where she moved to attend, at the same time as Sant'Anna, the law degree course at the University of the same city. In 1989 she graduated from the Sant'Anna School of Advanced Studies and in 1990 she graduated in law with full marks and honors from the University of Pisa. In 1992, she obtained with full marks and honors the PhD at the Sant'Anna School of Advanced Studies.

From 1994 to 1999 she was a researcher in private law at the Sant'Anna School of Advanced Studies and, since 1999, an associate professor of private law at the same school. From 2001 to 2020, Navarretta has been professor of private law and European private law at the Department of Law of the University of Pisa.

Among the various academic positions, she was director of the Department of Law of the University of Pisa from 2016 to 2020 and, in 2020, she was elected director of the Doctorate in Legal Sciences of the same university, for which he had already coordinated the private sector curriculum for many years.

In 2013, she was rapporteur at the Justice Commission of the Chamber of Deputies on the reform project regarding personal injury and in 2020 she has been deputy director of the Higher School of the Judiciary and member of the related Steering Committee following appointment by the High Council of the Judiciary.

On 9 September 2020, in view of the expiry of the mandate of Marta Cartabia, Navarretta was appointed by the President of the Republic Sergio Mattarella as judge of the Constitutional Court of Italy and sworn in on 15 September 2020.

Legal offices
Preceded by Marta Cartabia	Judge of the Constitutional Court of Italy; 2020–present	Incumbent
