= Institute of the Italian Encyclopaedia =

Italian publishing house

Treccani
- Institute Giovanni Treccani for the publication of the Italian Encyclopedia
- Istituto della Enciclopedia Italiana - Treccani (Italian)
- Named after: Giovanni Treccani
- Formation: 1925
- Founders: Giovanni Treccani and Giovanni Gentile
- Headquarters: Rome, Italy
- Owner: Istituto della Enciclopedia Italiana fondata da Giovanni Treccani S.p.A.
- President: Franco Gallo
- General Manager: Massimo Bray
- Website: www.treccani.it/istituto/

Institute of the Italian Encyclopaedia (Italian: Istituto della Enciclopedia Italiana), also known as Treccani Institute, is a publishing house and a cultural institution of national interest, founded in Rome in 1925. Its founders were Giovanni Treccani and philosopher Giovanni Gentile, along with the involvement of other prominent figures such as Marshal of Italy Luigi Cadorna and admiral Paolo Thaon di Revel, historians Gaetano De Sanctis and Francesco Salata, economists Luigi Einaudi and Angelo Sraffa, painter Vittorio Grassi, physician Ettore Marchiafava, jurist Silvio Longhi, journalist Ugo Ojetti, and President of the Italian Senate Tommaso Tittoni. It is known for publishing the first edition and the subsequent ten supplements of the Italian Encyclopaedia of Science, Literature and Arts (Italian: Enciclopedia Italiana di scienze, lettere ed arti).

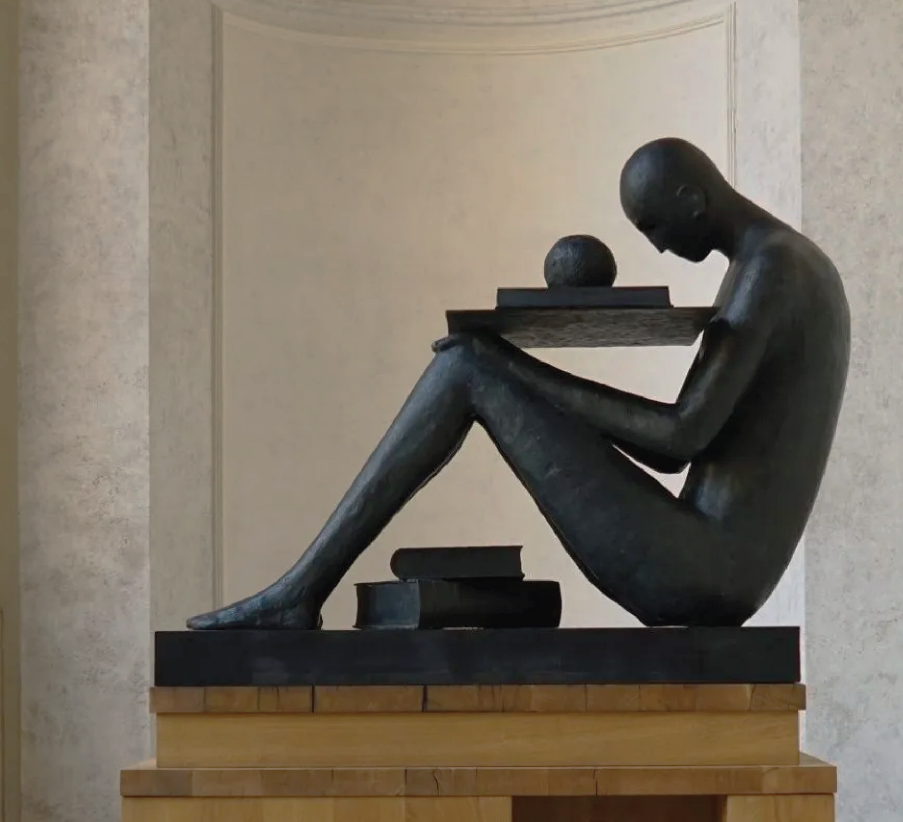
La Conoscenza ("The Knowledge") by Mimmo Paladino at the Institute of the Italian Encyclopedia

== History ==
The Institute of the Italian Encyclopaedia was founded in Rome in 1925 by Giovanni Treccani, with the philosopher Giovanni Gentile as editor-in-chief. In addition to the founder, who was also its president, and philosopher Gentile, who was its first scientific director, its members included publisher Calogero Tumminelli as editorial director, the linguist Antonino Pagliaro as editor-in-chief, Gian Alberto Blanc, Pietro Bonfante, Luigi Cadorna, Alberto De Stefani, Gaetano De Sanctis, Luigi Einaudi, Vittorio Grassi, Ettore Marchiafava, Silvio Longhi, Ferdinando Martini, Ugo Ojetti, Francesco Salata, Vittorio Scialoja, Angelo Sraffa, Paolo Thaon di Revel, and Tommaso Tittoni.

The first publication by the Institute was the Enciclopedia Italiana di Scienze, Lettere e Arti (lit. 'Italian Encyclopaedia of Science, Letters, and Arts'), which was completed in 1939, and consisted of 36 volumes. Best known as Enciclopedia Italiana or the Great Encyclopaedia, it is an Italian-language encyclopaedia and is regarded as one of the great encyclopaedias, being international in scope, alongside Encyclopædia Britannica and others.

Since the 1990s, Treccani has played a leading role arts publishing and facsimile editions, reproducing many medieval manuscripts from the notable Italian and European libraries. Alongside these activities, it has gained a consistent presence in digital publishing, publishing e-books, apps, and the Treccani.it portal, which had over 80 million unique users in 2022.

== Publishing and works ==
=== Italian Encyclopaedia ===
The first edition of the Great Encyclopaedia was published serially between 1929 and 1937. The encyclopaedia's 35 volumes (plus one index volume) included 60,000 articles and 50 million words. Each volume is approximately 1,015 pages, and supplementary volumes were published between 1938 and 2020.

=== 10th Appendix ===
An update to the Great Encyclopaedia, the 10th Appendix is a reflection by Treccani on contemporaneity. Its challenges and problematic issues are analyzed through over 350 keywords assigned to authors of the highest scientific profile and to young scholars who have now established themselves at the international level.

=== Biographical Dictionary of the Italians ===
This work is a monumental national biography constructed from over forty thousand biographies of Italians who have contributed to the artistic, cultural, political, scientific, religious, literary and economic history of the country, from the fall of the Western Roman Empire to the present day.

=== Vocabolario Treccani ===
The Treccani Vocabulary is an extensive, encyclopedic-level dictionary of the Italian language, comprising over 800,000 entries, with an illustrative apparatus of drawings and plates. Each word includes its own etymology, all its meanings and definitions, and is accompanied by quotations from classical and modern authors.

The first edition with the title Vocabolario della lingua italiana ("Vocabulary of the Italian Language") was published between 1986 and 1994 in 4 volumes, the third of which in two tomes, under the direction of Aldo Duro. In 1997, the work was reissued, as a second edition, in 5 volumes, with the title Il Vocabolario Treccani. The same year, a short volume of Addenda was released with a CD-ROM of the dictionary. It was followed in 2003 by a volume of Sinonimi e contrari ("Synonyms and Antonyms", also available on CD-ROM) and, in 2008, by another volume of Neologismi ("Neologisms"). Additionally, Il Conciso was published in 1998, and Il Visuale (also available on CD-ROM) in 2003.

Since 2009, an online version of the Treccani Vocabulary has been freely accessible.

=== Contemporary art ===
This is a work in 4 volumes, edited by Vincenzo Trione and Valeria Della Valle, supported by an international scientific committee: a survey of the art of our time, with the aim of documenting, in the broadest and most inclusive perspective, the various components that make up the system of art throughout the world. The work catalogues not only the artists themselves, but also art historians, critics and curators, gallerists, merchants and dealers.

=== Italian Enterprise ===
In two volumes, edited by Franco Amatori and Marco D'Alberti, this work recounts the most significant entrepreneurial, technological and scientific developments in the history of Italy. "The Stories", with its wide selection of biographies of the most representative industrial enterprises, aims to provide a picture of Italian companies in their variety of size, territory, sector, and governance. "The Context" frames thematic essays that recount the history of Italian enterprise in its complex operating context, in its relationship with institutions and politics, and in the competitive scene of globalization.

=== Facsimile reproductions ===
Facsimile reproductions of illuminated manuscripts kept in the most important European libraries contribute to the conservation and diffusion of an immense common artistic and literary heritage. The latest publications are those of the magnificent code preserved in Florence in the Laurentian Library, with the signature Plut. 6.23, an 11th–12th-century Gospel book, accompanied by a systematic illustrative apparatus. The 237 folios contain 285 illustrations. As Tania Velmans defines it in the essay published in the volume accompanying the facsimile (Il Tetravangelo della Laurenziana, Florence, Laur. Plut. 6.23, 2020), it is "an almost unique specimen for the abundance of his illustrations, fidelity to the evangelical texts, the will to reconstruct the evangelical story through the image, in an almost integral way" (p. 36).

== See also ==
- Lists of encyclopedias
