= Francesco Saverio Marini =

Italian jurist (born 1973)

Judge of the Constitutional Court
- Incumbent
- Assumed office 19 February 2025
- Appointed by: Italian Parliament

Personal details
- Born: 28 April 1973 (age 53) Rome, Italy
- Party: Brothers of Italy
- Parent: Annibale Marini (father)
- Education: University of Rome Tor Vergata
- Profession: Lawyer, university professor

Francesco Saverio Marini (born 28 April 1973) is an Italian jurist and professor of the University of Rome Tor Vergata who was elected judge of the Constitutional Court in 2025. He is the son of Annibale Marini, former judge and president of the Constitutional Court.

== Biography ==
The son of Annibale Marini, former judge and president of the Constitutional Court of Italy, he graduated in law from the University of Rome Tor Vergata.

Actively engaged in teaching at his alma mater, where he has taught since 2004, he is a full professor of “Institutions of Public Law.”

A member of the Rome Bar Association since 2004, he has been actively practising as a case lawyer since 2005.
