= Giovanni Amoroso =

Italian judge

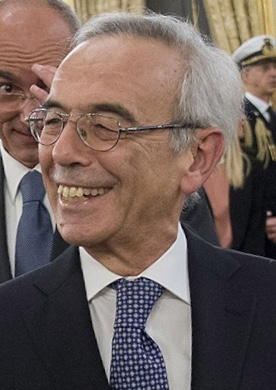

President of the Constitutional Court of Italy
- In office 21 January 2025 – 13 November 2026
- Preceded by: Augusto Barbera
- Succeeded by: Francesco Viganò

Judge of the Constitutional Court of Italy
- In office 13 November 2017 – 13 November 2026
- Appointed by: Court of Cassation
- Preceded by: Alessandro Criscuolo
- Succeeded by: Alberto Giusti (Elect)

Personal details
- Born: 30 March 1949 (age 77) Mercato San Severino, Italy
- Education: Sapienza University of Rome
- Profession: Judge

Giovanni Amoroso (born 30 March 1949) is an Italian judge. He has been Judge of the Constitutional Court of Italy from 13 November 2017 to 13 November 2026 and its President since 21 January 2025.

Amoroso was born in Mercato San Severino on 30 March 1949.

He was elected to the Constitutional Court by the Court of Cassation on 26 October 2017. He won 210 votes, with his competitor Renato Rordorf obtaining 11. At the time of his election Amoroso served as president of the labour section of the Court of Cassation. He was sworn in on 13 November 2017. Amoroso succeeded Alessandro Criscuolo.

On 21 January 2025, he was unanimously elected as President of the Constitutional Court.

== Biography ==
He has been a magistrate of the Court of cassation, president of the labor section (since 2016), a member of the United Civil Sections (since 2006), and director of the Office of the Supreme and Roll. He was also a cassation counselor at the third criminal section and at the labor section.

He was also previously a university lecturer in civil law at the University of Macerata and in constitutional law at the Libera Università Mediterranea of Casamassima.

He is the author of numerous publications on labor law, constitutional justice, civil law and civil procedure.

On Oct. 26, 2017, he was elected a constitutional judge, where he had already been a longtime study assistant, by the judges of the Supreme Court in a runoff vote. He was sworn in and thus officially took office on November 13. On Dec. 12, 2023, he was appointed vice president of the Constitutional Court by newly elected President Augusto Antonio Barbera.

On May 16, 2018, he visited the Institute of Technical and Vocational High School Education in Verres (Aosta) as part of the “Trip to Schools.” In response to a student's question, he expressed his opposition to the introduction of dissenting opinions in the Italian legal system, including those of constitutional judges.

On January 21, 2025, he was unanimously elected president of the List of presidents of the Constitutional Court of Italy.

== Honour ==
- Italy: Knight Grand Cross of the Order of Merit of the Italian Republic (29 November 2018)

Legal offices
Preceded by Alessandro Criscuolo	Judge of the Constitutional Court of Italy; 2017-2026	Succeeded by Alberto Giusti
Preceded by Augusto Barbera	President of the Constitutional Court of Italy; 2025-2026	Succeeded by Francesco Viganò
