= List of presidents of the Constitutional Court of Italy =

President of the Constitutional Court of Italy
- Presidente della Corte Costituzionale della Repubblica Italiana
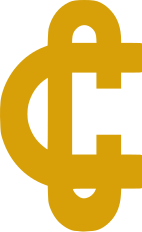

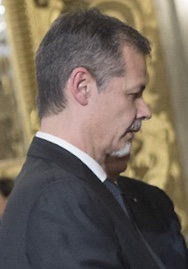
- Incumbent; Francesco Viganò since 14 November 2026
- Member of: Constitutional Court of Italy
- Appointer: Judges of the Constitutional Court
- Term length: Three years or less
- Constituting instrument: Constitution of Italy
- Inaugural holder: Enrico De Nicola
- Formation: 23 January 1956; 70 years ago
- Website: cortecostituzionale.it

The president of the Constitutional Court of Italy (Italian: Presidente della Corte costituzionale della Repubblica Italiana) holds the fifth-ranking public office of the Italian Republic.

== List of presidents ==
Portrait	Name	Term of office			Term as Judge	Ref.
Portrait	Name	Took office	Left office	Time in office	Term as Judge	Ref.
	Enrico De Nicola (1877–1959)	23 January 1956	26 March 1957	1 year, 62 days	1955–1957	
	Gaetano Azzariti (1881–1961)	6 April 1957	5 January 1961	3 years, 274 days	1955–1961†	
	Giuseppe Cappi (1883–1963)	4 March 1961	10 October 1962	1 year, 220 days	1955–1963†	
	Gaspare Ambrosini (1886–1985)	20 October 1962	15 December 1967	5 years, 56 days	1955–1967	
	Aldo Sandulli (1915–1984)	16 January 1968	4 April 1969	1 year, 78 days	1957–1969	
	Giuseppe Branca (1907–1987)	10 May 1969	9 July 1971	2 years, 60 days	1959–1971	
	Giuseppe Chiarelli (1904–1978)	22 November 1971	16 February 1973	1 year, 86 days	1961–1973	
	Francesco Paolo Bonifacio (1923–1989)	23 February 1973	25 October 1975	2 years, 244 days	1963–1975	
	Paolo Rossi (1900–1985)	18 December 1975	9 May 1978	2 years, 142 days	1969–1979	
	Leonetto Amadei (1911–1997)	5 March 1979	28 June 1981	2 years, 115 days	1972–1981	
	Leopoldo Elia (1925–2008)	21 September 1981	7 May 1985	3 years, 228 days	1976–1985	
	Livio Paladin (1933–2000)	3 July 1985	1 July 1986	363 days	1977–1986	
	Antonio La Pergola (1931–2007)	2 July 1986	14 June 1987	347 days	1978–1987	
	Francesco Saja (1915–1994)	15 June 1987	22 October 1990	3 years, 129 days	1981–1990	
	Giovanni Conso (1922–2015)	23 October 1990	3 February 1991	103 days	1982–1991	
	Ettore Gallo (1914–2001)	4 February 1991	14 July 1991	160 days	1982–1991	
	Aldo Corasaniti (1922–2011)	15 July 1991	14 November 1992	1 year, 122 days	1983–1992	
	Francesco Paolo Casavola (1931–2026)	15 November 1992	25 February 1995	2 years, 102 days	1986–1995	
	Antonio Baldassarre (born 1940)	26 February 1995	8 September 1995	194 days	1986–1995	
	Vincenzo Caianiello (1932–2002)	9 September 1995	23 October 1995	75 days	1986–1995	
	Mauro Ferri (1920–2015)	24 October 1995	3 November 1996	1 year, 10 days	1987–1996	
	Renato Granata (1926–2017)	4 November 1996	4 November 1999	3 years, 0 days	1990–1999	
	Giuliano Vassalli (1915–2009)	11 November 1999	13 February 2000	94 days	1991–2000	
	Cesare Mirabelli (born 1942)	23 February 2000	21 November 2000	272 days	1991–2000	
	Cesare Ruperto (1925–2026)	5 January 2001	2 December 2002	1 year, 331 days	1993–2002	
	Riccardo Chieppa (1926–2025)	5 December 2002	23 January 2004	1 year, 49 days	1995–2004	
	Gustavo Zagrebelsky (born 1943)	28 January 2004	13 September 2004	229 days	1995–2004	
	Valerio Onida (1936–2022)	22 September 2004	30 January 2005	130 days	1996–2005	
	Piero Alberto Capotosti (1942–2014)	10 March 2005	6 November 2005	241 days	1996–2005	
	Annibale Marini (1940–2025)	10 November 2005	9 July 2006	241 days	1997–2006	
	Franco Bile (1929–2022)	11 July 2006	8 November 2008	2 years, 120 days	1999–2008	
	Giovanni Maria Flick (born 1940)	14 November 2008	18 February 2009	96 days	2000–2009	
	Francesco Amirante (1933–2024)	25 February 2009	7 December 2010	1 year, 285 days	2001–2010	
	Ugo De Siervo (born 1942)	10 December 2010	29 April 2011	140 days	2002–2011	
	Alfonso Quaranta (1936–2023)	6 June 2011	27 January 2013	1 year, 235 days	2004–2013	
	Franco Gallo (born 1937)	29 January 2013	16 September 2013	230 days	2004–2013	
	Gaetano Silvestri (born 1944)	18 September 2013	28 June 2014	283 days	2005–2014	
	Giuseppe Tesauro (1942–2021)	30 July 2014	9 November 2014	102 days	2005–2014	
	Alessandro Criscuolo (1937–2020)	12 November 2014	24 February 2016	1 year, 104 days	2008–2017	
	Paolo Grossi (1933–2022)	24 February 2016	8 March 2018	2 years, 12 days	2009–2018	
	Giorgio Lattanzi (born 1939)	8 March 2018	9 December 2019	1 year, 276 days	2010–2019	
	Marta Cartabia (born 1963)	11 December 2019	13 September 2020	277 days	2011–2020	
	Mario Rosario Morelli (born 1941)	16 September 2020	18 December 2020	93 days	2011–2020	
	Giancarlo Coraggio (born 1940)	18 December 2020	28 January 2022	1 year, 41 days	2013–2022	
	Giuliano Amato (born 1938)	29 January 2022	18 September 2022	232 days	2013–2022	
	Silvana Sciarra (born 1948)	20 September 2022	11 November 2023	1 year, 52 days	2014–2023	
	Augusto Antonio Barbera (born 1938)	12 December 2023	21 December 2024	1 year, 9 days	2015–2024	
	Giovanni Amoroso (born 1949)	21 January 2025	13 November 2026	1 year, 296 days	2017–2026	
	Francesco Viganò (born 1966)	14 November 2026	Incumbent	1 day	2018–2027	
