= Maria Alessandra Sandulli =

Italian jurist and magistrate (born 1956)

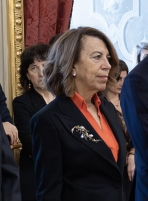
- Sandulli in 2025

Judge of the Constitutional Court of Italy
- Incumbent
- Assumed office 19 February 2025
- Appointed by: Parliament of Italy

Personal details
- Born: 1956 (age 69–70) Naples, Italy
- Party: Independent
- Parent: Aldo Mazzini Sandulli (father)
- Education: Sapienza University of Rome

Maria Alessandra Sandulli (born 1956) is an Italian lawyer, professor and magistrate. She has been judge of the Constitutional Court of Italy since 2025.

== Early life and education ==
Sandulli was born in 1956 in Naples, Italy as the daughter of Aldo Mazzini Sandulli who served as president of the Constitutional Court of Italy. She got a degree in law from the Sapienza University of Rome in 1977, specialising in administrative law in 1978.

== Career ==
She has been a legal prosecutor since 1979 and as lawyer in Rome since 1984 at her own office and has been authorised to practise before the Italian Court of Cassation since 1985. Sandulli began her academic career at the Sapienza University of Rome and was appointed to the chair of administrative law in 1987. Since 2001, she has been a full professor of administrative law in the department of law at Roma Tre University, where she has taught administrative law and administrative justice, as well as health law between 2017 and 2020. She has also served as a visiting lecturer at the University of Paris 1 Panthéon-Sorbonne.

Sandulli has served on national committees responsible for drafting major legislative reforms, such as the Code of Administrative Procedure and the Public Contracts Code, as well as on working groups on differentiated autonomy and public health.

In November 2014, prime minister Matteo Renzi proposed her as a magistrate of the Constitutional Court, but following a controversy she was not approved. On 13 February 2025 the Parliament of Italy elected Sandulli, alongside three new judges, as the new judge of the Constitutional Court. She was sworn in on 19 February at the Quirinal Palace by Italian president Sergio Mattarella.
