= Vincenza Bono Parrino =

Italian jurist and politician (born 1942)

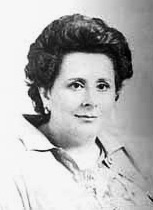

Minister of Cultural and Environmental Heritage
- In office 13 April 1988 – 21 July 1989
- Prime Minister: Ciriaco De Mita

Personal details
- Born: 29 October 1942 (age 83) Alcamo, Kingdom of Italy
- Party: Italian Democratic Socialist Party

Vincenza Bono Parrino (born 1942) is a retired Italian teacher and politician. She served as the Minister of cultural and environmental heritage in the cabinet led by Prime Minister Ciriaco De Mita from 1988 to 1989. She was a member of the Italian Democratic Socialist Party.

== Biography ==
Bono Parrino was born in Alcamo on 29 October 1942. She is a literature and history teacher and a high school administrator by profession. She served as a city councilor in Alcamo. She was a member of the Italian Senate for two terms, legislatures X (1987–1992) and XI (1992–1994) representing Sicily for the Italian Democratic Socialist Party. She was elected to the Senate after her husband died while serving as a senator. During her term in the senate Bono Parrino was the president of the Italian Democratic Socialist Party being the first Italian woman to hold this post.

She was appointed Minister of cultural and environmental heritage on 13 April 1988 in the cabinet headed by Ciriaco De Mita and held the post until 21 July 1989.
