= Maria Rita Saulle =

Italian judge

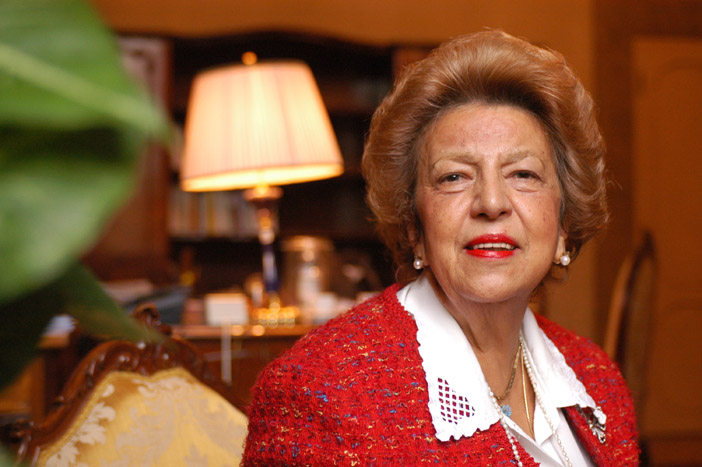
Maria Rita Saulle

Maria Rita Saulle was a professor of law and a judge in the Italian Constitutional Court from November 2005 until her death on 7 July 2011.

== Career ==
Saulle was Full Professor of International Law and Human Rights in the Faculty of Political Sciences at the Sapienza University of Rome. She was director of the master's course on International Protection of Human Rights and founded a PhD in International Order and Human Rights. She was appointed judge of the Constitutional Court by the President of Italy on 4 November 2005.

From 1981 to 1983 and from 1989 to 1990 she taught as full professor at the Faculty of Maritime Economy in Napíes, holding chairs in International Law, International Navigation Law and European Communities Law and heading the Institute of Public Law. In accordance with the wishes of United Nations High Commissioner for Refugees (UNHCR), in 1992 she created the first course at the University of Rome on the rights of migrants and refugees. This class is attended by 200 students annually.

From 1983 to 1986 she taught European Community Law regularly at the Scuola Superiore della Pubblica Amministrazione (School of Public Administration). She lectured at conferences and meetings at Italian and foreign universities (including Milan, Turin, Trieste, Napíes, Salerno, Messina, Catania, Palermo, Rio de Janeiro, Oslo, Bonn, Luxembourg and Strasbourg) and international bodies (including the Council of Europe and the European Parliament).

She served as chair of the Communication Committee of the UNESCO National Commission from 1990 to 2000 and as chair of the Human Rights Committee from 2000. She was a member of: the Interministerial Committee for Human Rights at the Ministry of Foreign Affairs; the Committee for Constitutional Culture at the Ministry of Public Education; the Observatory on Disability until 1994; the National Commission for Gender Equality at the Prime Minister's Office from 1984 to 1992.

She served as expert advisor to the Minister for Community Policies from 1991 to 1993. She was the Italian delegate to working group charged with drafting the UN Convention on the Rights of the Child (1986–1989). She was a member of the Italian delegation to the UN World Conference on "Equality, Development and Peace", where in 1987 she presented the Italian proposal to draft a world convention on the rights of disabled persons, which took effect on 3 May 2008. She was a member of the Italian delegation to the 1985 UN World Conference on Women in Nairobi. She was a member of the Italian delegation to the UN Generai Assembly in 1987–91 and 1999. She was head of the Italian delegation to the 1987 Council of Europe Colloquy on Violence within the Family. She was deputy chair of the 1987 UNESCO World Conference on "Women from Education to Work". She was a member of the Italian delegation to the 1993 United Nations Conference on Human Rights. She represented Italy in the fields of communications and human rights at the UNESCO Conferences from 1981 to 2005. She participated as one of the 25 UN world experts in the 1987 UN Conference in Stockholm. She represented Italy in negotiating the "standard rules" approved by the UN Generai Assembly in 1992.

In 1996 the president of the European Court of Human Rights in Strasbourg appointed her president of the Commission for the restitution of real property to refugees and displaced persons (CRPC) envisaged by Annex VII to the Dayton Agreement. She served on that Commission until 31 December 2003.

She was editor of the series "Scienze del Diritto e dell'Economia" (Legal and Economic Sciences), published by Edizioni Scientifiche Italiane.

== Books published ==
- L'errore negli atti giuridici internazionali, Milan, 1963
- Le avarie comuni nel diritto internazionale privato marittimo ed aereo, 1970
- Appunti di storia e di diritto dei trattati, 1972
- Nato and its activities (New York), 1979
- The Disabled Persons and the International Organizations, New York, 1981
- Diritto comunitario e diritto internazionale privato, 1984
- Saggi di diritto e di organizzazione internazionale, 1986
- Saggi di diritto comunitario e di diritto internazionale privato, 1986
- Codice del movimento dei capitali normativa comunitaria e nazionale (parte comunitaria), 1989
- L'Europa ad una svolta: problemi economici e giuridici, 1990
- II riconoscimento dei titoli di studio in Europa, 1992
- Codice internazionale dei diritti del minore, 1992
- Insegnamento e ricerche sui diritti fondamentali in Italia (vol. 1), 1990–1991
- Lezioni di organizzazione internazionale: vol. I Le organizzazioni a carattere universale e regionale; vol. II Le organizzazioni internazionali e i diritti umani, 1998
- L'azione delle Nazioni Unite e degli enti regionali favore dei disabili, Ministry of Health, 1989
- La Convenzione delle Nazioni Unite sui diritti del minore e l'ordinamento italiano, 1994
- Minori, Bioetica e norme standard, 1995
- Asilo, migrazione e lavoro, 1995
- Il trattato di Maastricht, 1995
- The Rights of the Child, New York, 1995
- Le nuove norme di diritto internazionale privato, 1995
- Lezioni di diritto internazionale, Naples, 2001
- I cinquant'anni dell'UNESCO: democrazia e informazione, 1996
- Le norme standard sulle pari opportunità dei disabili, 1998
- Dalla tutela giuridica all'esercizio dei diritti, 1999+
- Gli accordi di Dayton a oltre cinque anni dalla conclusione, Rome, 2001
- Lezioni di Organizzazione internazionale, vol. I, 2nd ed., Naples, 2002
- La Convenzione di Ginevra sullo status dei rifugiati, Rome, 2002
- Lezioni di Organizzazione internazionale, vol. II, 2nd ed, Naples, 2003
- Le organizzazioni internazionali e i diritti umani, vol. II, 2nd ed., Naples, 2003
- L'Europa tra Costituzione, Asilo e Migrazione, Naples, 2004
- La Corte costituzionale compie 50 anni, Rome, 2006
- Migrazione e terrorismo: due fenomeni impropriamente abbinati, Naples, 2006
- L'integrazione dei cittadini di Paesi terzi nell'Europa allargata, Naples, 2006
- La Convenzione delle Nazioni Unite sui diritti delle persone con disabilità, translation edited by Maria Rita Saulle, Ministry of Foreign Affairs – Interministerial Committee on Human Rights, Rome, March 2007
- Relazioni Internazionali e Diritti fondamentali 1981–2005. Cronache e opinioni, Aracne editrice, Rome, December 2007

== Decoration ==
Order of Merit of the Italian Republic
