= Valerio Onida =

Italian jurist and professor (1936–2022)

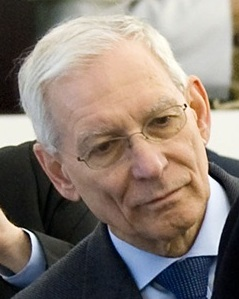

President of the Constitutional Court of Italy
- In office 22 September 2004 – 30 January 2005
- Preceded by: Gustavo Zagrebelsky
- Succeeded by: Piero Alberto Capotosti

Judge of the Constitutional Court of Italy
- In office 30 January 1996 – 30 January 2005
- Appointed by: Italian Parliament

Personal details
- Born: 30 March 1936 Milan, Italy
- Died: 14 May 2022 (aged 86) Milan, Italy
- Children: 5
- Education: University of Milan

Valerio Onida (30 March 1936 – 14 May 2022) was an Italian jurist, and constitutional law professor, Judge of the Constitutional Court of Italy and President of the Court from September 2004 to January 2005.

== Biography ==
Professor of Constitutional Law at the University of Milan from 1983 to 2009, in January 1996, Onida was elected Judge of the Constitutional Court of Italy by the Parliament. He remained in office for nine years, until January 2005. In the last four months, Onida has also been President of the Constitutional Court.

In 2010, Onida was a candidate for the center-left primary elections for the Mayor of Milan, and he ranked third: the winner was Giuliano Pisapia, who was later elected Mayor.

Onida was very critical of the 2016 constitutional referendum proposed by Prime Minister Matteo Renzi and appealed against it, since, according to him, too many questions were presented in the referendum. Onida's appeal was rejected and he announced that on 4 December he would have voted "No".
