= Marco D'Alberti =

Italian jurist

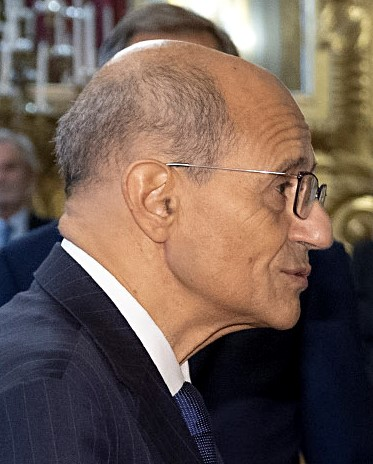

Judge of the Constitutional Court of Italy
- Incumbent
- Assumed office 20 September 2022
- Appointed by: Sergio Mattarella
- Preceded by: Giuliano Amato

Personal details
- Born: 10 August 1948 (age 78) Rome, Italy
- Education: Sapienza University of Rome
- Profession: Academic, lawyer

Marco D'Alberti (born 10 August 1948) is an Italian jurist who has served as a Judge of the Constitutional Court of Italy since 2022.

== Biography ==
Graduated in law at the Sapienza University of Rome, D'Alberti began his career as assistant in administrative law to Massimo Severo Giannini, a chair that he was later to assume from 1985 as full professor.

In addition to the Roman university, he also taught at the Universities of Camerino, Urbino and LUISS. He has researched and taught several times at foreign universities, including Cambridge, Harvard, Yale, Panthéon-Assas in Paris and Columbia University.

D'Alberti was also a member of the National Council for Economics and Labour from 1995 to 1997 and, in the same period, a member of the Scientific Committee of the CONSOB. From 1997 to 2004 he was a member of the Italian Competition Authority.

On 15 September 2022, in view of the expiry of the mandate of Giuliano Amato, D'Alberti was appointed by the President of the Republic Sergio Mattarella as judge of the Constitutional Court of Italy.

Legal offices
Preceded by Giuliano Amato	Judge of the Constitutional Court of Italy; 2022–present	Incumbent
