= Italian Competition Authority =

Italian administrative authority

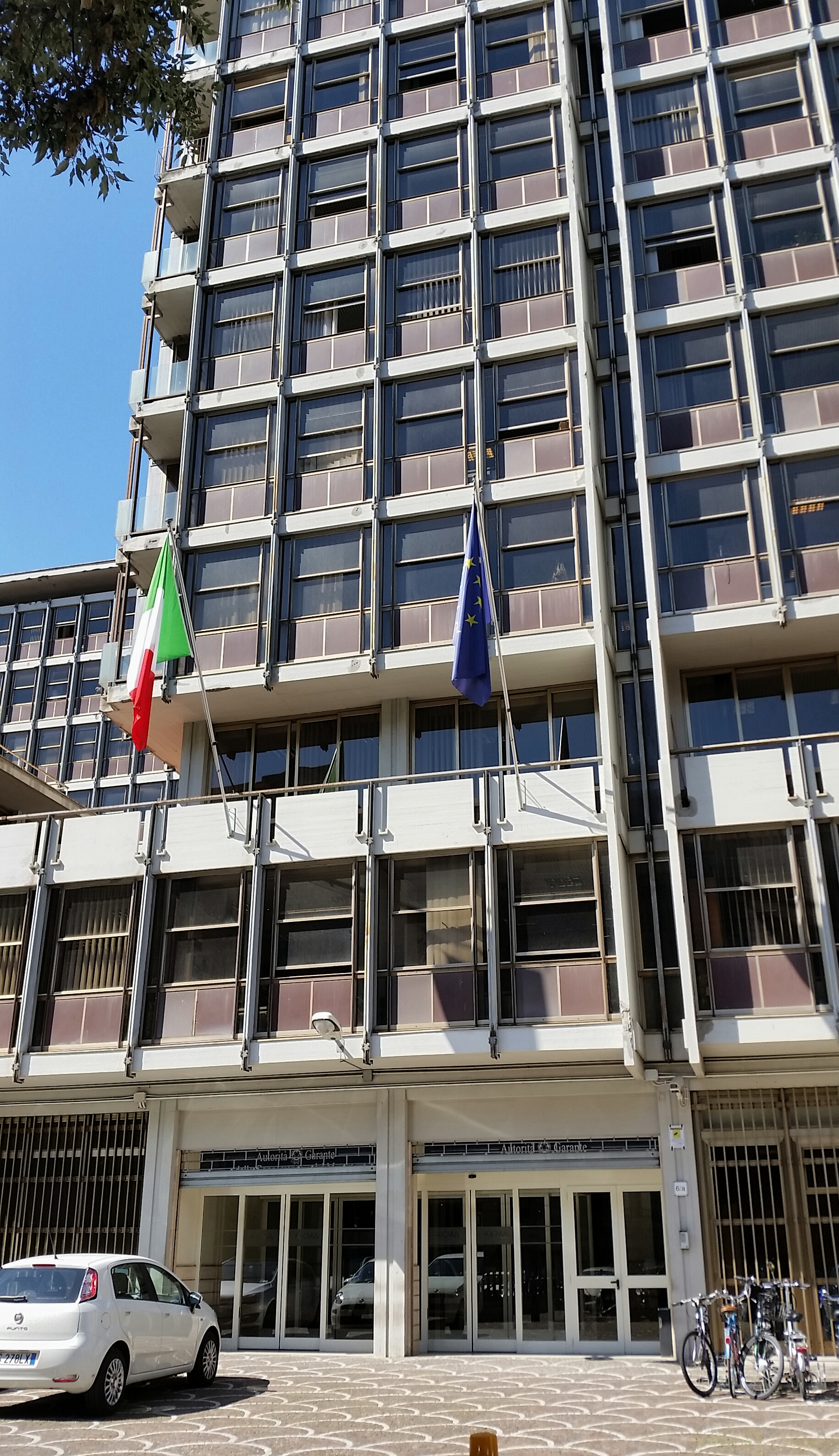
The seat of the AGCM, Rome

The Italian Competition Authority (Italian: Autorità Garante della Concorrenza e del Mercato, AGCM) is the competition regulator in Italy. It is an Italian quasi-autonomous non-governmental organization established on the basis of Law №287 of 10 October 1990.

As of 2004, the Italian Competition Authority has also been in charge of enforcing laws against conflicts of interest for Holders of Public Office.

As the Italian competition regulator, the Authority has the task of enforcing both Italian and European consumer protection laws.

It is financed by annual allocations through a special chapter of the Ministry of Economic Development's budget. The Financial Law of 2006 introduced partial self-financing: AGCM has full control over the management of these funds for its own operations.

An annual report is presented to the President of the Council of Ministers of Italy.

== Duties ==
The main duties of the authority are:

- Vigilance against abuses from market dominance.
- Vigilance against cartels that may prejudice or restrict fair competition (Anti-competitive practices).
- Vigilance on takeovers to check concentration ratio and verify market impact.
- Consumer protection, against unfair trade practices and false advertising.
- Supervise and penalize the cases of conflict of interest regarding members of Government of Italy.

== Powers ==
The Authority in such cases may conduct investigations or hearings, even with the Guardia di Finanza at his disposal, which may result in a warning or an administrative penalty.

== Notable cases ==
- In 2021, the Authority fined Amazon 1.13 billion euros ($1.28 billion) for alleged abuse of market dominance in intermediation services on marketplaces to favour the adoption of its own logistics service - Fulfilment by Amazon (FBA) - by sellers active on Amazon.it.
- In 2022, the Authority fined Xiaomi around 3.2 million Euros (21.76 million Yuan), for refusing to repair phones still under warranty.
- In 2025, the Authority fined Apple Inc. 98 million Euros ($115 million), for violating privacy regulations for third-party developers.
- In 2025, the Authority fined Ryanair 255 million Euros ($300 million), for abusing its market position to hinder travel agencies from combining Ryanair flights with other services from 2023 to 2025.

== Presidents ==
The Italian Competition Authority is led by a Presidents. In its history the following individuals have held this function:

- Francesco Saja (7 November 1990 – 31 July 1994)
- Giuliano Amato (11 November 1994 – 31 December 1997)
- Giuseppe Tesauro (12 March 1998 – 16 February 2005)
- Antonio Catricalà (1 March 2005 – 16 November 2011)
- Giovanni Pitruzzella (29 November 2011 – 30 September 2018)
- Roberto Rustichelli (since 2018)

== Codacons ==
The Competition Authority works sometimes with the Coordinamento delle associazioni per la difesa dell'ambiente e dei diritti degli utenti e dei consumatori, known in English as the Codacons. It is an organisation with the competence to protect with all legitimate means the rights and dignity of consumers and users. However in a case against Ryanair in 2022, the authority also sanction the Codacons for approving the terms and conditions of Ryanair which the authority found unfair.
