= Riccardo Chieppa =

Italian magistrate (1926–2025)

President of the Constitutional Court
- In office 5 December 2002 – 23 January 2004
- Preceded by: Cesare Ruperto
- Succeeded by: Gustavo Zagrebelsky

Judge of the Constitutional Court of Italy
- In office 23 January 1995 – 23 January 2004
- Preceded by: Gabriele Pescatore
- Succeeded by: Alfonso Quaranta

Personal details
- Born: 24 May 1926 Rome, Italy
- Died: 18 January 2025 (aged 98) Rome, Italy
- Education: Sapienza University of Rome
- Occupation: Magistrate

Riccardo Chieppa (24 May 1926 – 18 January 2025) was an Italian magistrate. He served as a judge of the Constitutional Court from 1995 to 2004 and served as its President from 2002 to 2004.

Chieppa died in Rome on 18 January 2025, at the age of 98.
