= Alfonso Bonafede =

Italian lawyer and politician

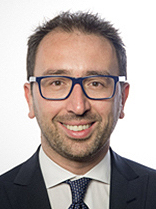

Minister of Justice
- In office 1 June 2018 – 13 February 2021
- Prime Minister: Giuseppe Conte
- Preceded by: Andrea Orlando
- Succeeded by: Marta Cartabia

Member of the Chamber of Deputies
- In office 15 March 2013 – 12 October 2022
- Constituency: XII Tuscany

Personal details
- Born: 2 July 1976 (age 49) Mazara del Vallo, Sicily, Italy
- Party: Five Star Movement
- Education: University of Florence; University of Pisa (PhD)
- Profession: Lawyer

Alfonso Bonafede (born 2 July 1976) is an Italian lawyer and politician who has served as the Italian Minister of Justice since 1 June 2018. A lawyer by profession, Bonafede has also served as a member of the Chamber of Deputies from 15 March 2013 until 12 October 2022.

== Early life ==
Born in Mazara del Vallo, a town in Sicily, Bonafede studied law at the University of Florence and the University of Pisa; in 2006, he earned a PhD from the University of Pisa.

== Political career ==
Bonafede was first introduced to politics by Beppe Grillo, standing as the Five Star Movement's candidate for Mayor of Florence in 2009, garnering 1.82% of the vote.

In the Italian general election in 2013, he was elected to the Chamber of Deputies as a member of the Five Star Movement, representing the XII district of Tuscany; Bonafede was reelected in the Italian general election of 2018.

During the formation of government following the 2018 election, his name was put forth as a possible prime minister.

Instead, Bonafede was sworn in as Minister of Justice on 1 June 2018, as a member of the Conte Cabinet, and again on 5 September 2019, as a member of the second Conte Cabinet.

== See also ==
- Conte I Cabinet
