= Alessandro Criscuolo =

Italian judge (1937–2020)

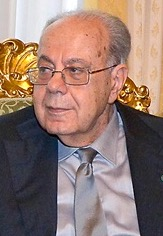

President of the Constitutional Court of Italy
- In office 12 November 2014 – 24 February 2016
- Preceded by: Giuseppe Tesauro
- Succeeded by: Paolo Grossi

Judge of the Constitutional Court of Italy
- In office 11 November 2008 – 11 November 2017

Personal details
- Born: 15 July 1937 Naples, Italy
- Died: 10 March 2020 (aged 82) Naples, Italy

Alessandro Criscuolo (15 July 1937 – 10 March 2020) was an Italian judge. He was President of the Constitutional Court of Italy between 12 November 2014 and 24 February 2016. He served as a Judge on the Court, between 2008 and 2017.

== Career ==
Criscuolo was born in Naples. He was elected to the Constitutional Court by the Court of Cassation on 28 October 2008, and he was sworn in on 11 November 2008. Criscuolo was elected President of the Constitutional Court on 12 November 2014. He was elected with eight votes. He served as President until 24 February 2016. His term as Judge ended on 11 November 2017.

Criscuolo died on 10 March 2020 in Naples.
