= Francesco Viganò =

Italian judge and criminal law professor

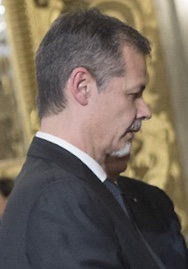

President of the Constitutional Court of Italy
- Incumbent
- Assumed office 14 November 2026
- Preceded by: Giovanni Amoroso

Judge of the Constitutional Court of Italy
- Incumbent
- Assumed office 8 March 2018
- Appointed by: Sergio Mattarella
- Preceded by: Paolo Grossi

Personal details
- Born: 1 March 1966 (age 60) Milan, Italy
- Education: University of Milan
- Profession: University professor

Francesco Viganò (born 1 March 1966) is an Italian judge and criminal law professor at the Bocconi University in Milan. He was appointed Judge of the Constitutional Court of Italy by president Sergio Mattarella, and sworn in on 8 March 2018.

== Biography ==
Viganò graduated in 1989 at the University of Milan, and after having stayed at LMU Munich from 1991 to 1993, in 1998 he obtained a research PhD from the University of Pavia.

A researcher since 1995 at the University of Brescia, in 2001 he became an associate professor at the same university teaching Comparative Penal Law. From 2004 to 2016, he taught Advanced Criminal Law and European Criminal Law at the University of Milan. From November 2016, he has taught Criminal Law and Transnational Criminal Law at the Bocconi University.

On 24 February 2018, he was appointed Judge of the Constitutional Court of Italy by president Sergio Mattarella as replacement of Paolo Grossi.

Legal offices
Preceded by Paolo Grossi	Judge of the Constitutional Court of Italy; 2018–present	Incumbent
Preceded by Giovanni Amoroso	President of the Constitutional Court of Italy; 2026–present	Incumbent
Order of precedence
Preceded by Giorgia Meloni as Prime Minister	Order of precedence of Italy; President of the Constitutional Court	Succeeded by Gian Marco Centinaio as Vice President of the Senate
