= Cesare Mirabelli =

Italian jurist

General Councilor of the Pontifical Commission for Vatican City State
- In office March 16, 2005 – August 1, 2023
- President: Edmund Szoka; Giovanni Lajolo; Giuseppe Bertello; Fernando Vérgez Alzaga
- Preceded by: Giulio Sacchetti
- Succeeded by: Vincenzo Buonuomo

Presidents of the Constitutional Court
- In office February 23, 2000 – November 21, 2000
- Preceded by: Giuliano Vassalli
- Succeeded by: Giuliano Vassalli

Judge of the Constitutional Court of the Italian Republic
- In office November 14, 1991 – November 21, 2000

Vice President of the High Council of the Judiciary
- In office March 6, 1986 – July 24, 1990
- Preceded by: Giancarlo De Carolis
- Succeeded by: Giovanni Galloni

Personal details
- Born: December 29, 1942 (age 83) Gimigliano, Kingdom of Italy
- Occupation: Jurist

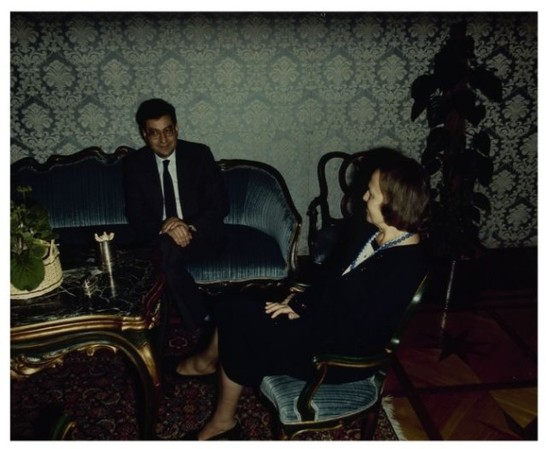
The President of the Chamber of Deputies, Nilde Lotti, meets Cesare Mirabelli, Vice President of the Superior Council of the Judiciary

Cesare Mirabelli (born December 29, 1942) is an Italian jurist. He served as the president of the Constitutional Court from February 23 to November 21, 2000 and the General Counselor of the Pontifical Commission for the State of Vatican City.

== Biography ==
A student of Pietro Gismondi, he has served as a magistrate, lawyer, and full professor of canon law at the Universities of Parma, Naples, and, since its foundation, at Roma Tor Vergata. He has also been a professor of constitutional law at the Pontifical Lateran University in Rome, as well as at the European University of Rome.

He was vice president of the High Council of the Judiciary from 1986 to 1990.

Elected constitutional judge by Parliament in joint session on November 14, 1991, he sworn in on November 21, 1991. He is elected president of the Constitutional Court on February 23, 2000. He ceased to hold the position of president on November 21, 2000.

Since 2006, he has been a member of the Board of Governors of the Bank of Italy.

He holds the position of general councilor of the Pontifical Commission for the Vatican City State.

He holds the position, within the Federazione Italiana Giuoco Calcio, as a member of the sports justice guarantee commission, chaired by Pasquale De Lise.

== Awards ==
- Knight of the Grand Cross of the Order of Merit of the Italian Republic (December 12, 1986)

== See also ==
- Constitutional Court of Italy
