= Paolo Grossi (judge) =

Italian judge (1933–2022)

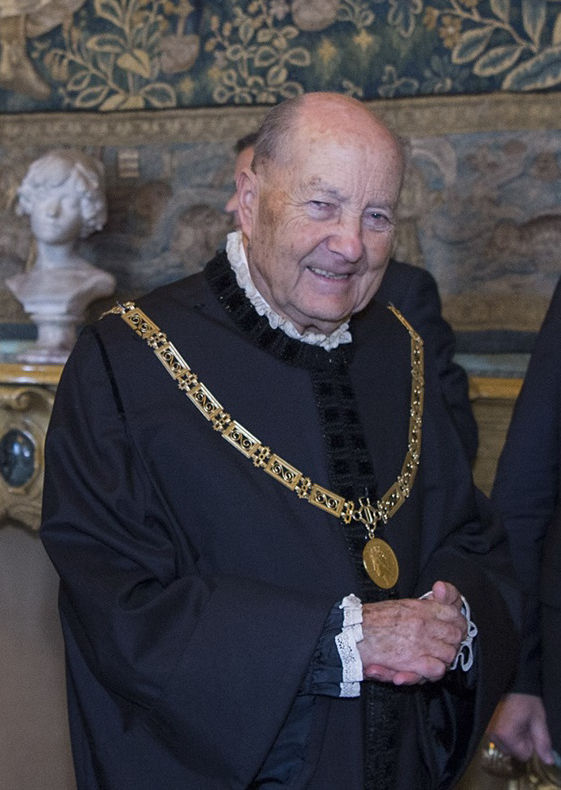

President of the Constitutional Court of Italy
- In office 24 February 2016 – 23 February 2018
- Preceded by: Alessandro Criscuolo
- Succeeded by: Giorgio Lattanzi

Judge of the Constitutional Court of Italy
- In office 23 February 2009 – 23 February 2018
- Appointed by: Giorgio Napolitano
- Preceded by: Giovanni Maria Flick
- Succeeded by: Francesco Viganò

Personal details
- Born: 29 January 1933 Florence, Italy
- Died: 4 July 2022 (aged 89) Florence, Italy

Paolo Grossi (29 January 1933 – 4 July 2022) was an Italian judge. He was President of the Constitutional Court of Italy between 24 February 2016 and 23 February 2018. Grossi served as Judge on the Court from 23 February 2009 to 23 February 2018.

== Career ==
Grossi was born in Florence. He was a law professor before he was appointed to the Constitutional Court by the President of Italy, Giorgio Napolitano, on 17 February 2009. Grossi was sworn in on 23 February 2009.

At the University of Florence he worked as a professor of History of Medieval and Modern Law.

Grossi was presented with the golden medal of the Italian Order of Merit for Culture and Art on 28 June 1985 and made Knight Grand Cross in the Order of Merit of the Italian Republic on 25 February 2009.

He was an Honorary Editor of the University of Bologna Law Review, a general student-edited law journal published by the Department of Legal Studies of the University of Bologna.

== Works ==
- Italian Civil Lawyers: An Historical Profile (2002)
- Law between Power and the Judicial System (2005)
- Society, Law, State: A Recovery for Law (2007)
- The Medieval Judicial System (2008)
- First Lesson on Law (2008)

Legal offices
| Preceded by Giovanni Maria Flick | Judge of the Constitutional Court of Italy; 2009–2018 | Succeeded by Francesco Viganò |
| Preceded by Alessandro Criscuolo | President of the Constitutional Court of Italy; 2016–2018 | Succeeded by Giorgio Lattanzi |
