= Luca Antonini (jurist) =

Italian lawyer and judge (born 1963)

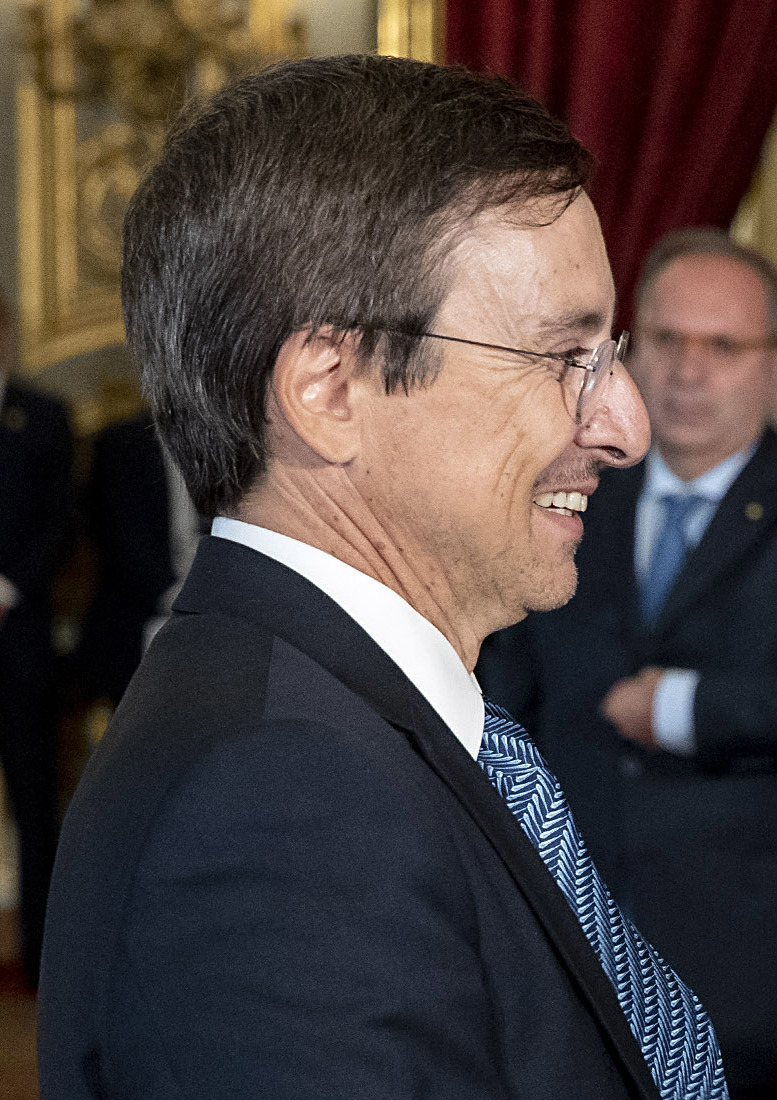

Judge of the Constitutional Court of Italy
- Incumbent
- Assumed office 26 July 2018
- Appointed by: Italian Parliament

Personal details
- Born: 27 May 1963 (age 63) Gallarate, Italy
- Education: University of Milan

Luca Antonini (born 27 May 1963) is an Italian lawyer, jurist, and constitutional law professor at the University of Padua. He is Judge of the Constitutional Court of Italy since 26 July 2018.

== Biography ==
Graduated in 1988 at the University of Milan, Antonini has been since 2001 professor of Constitutional Law at the University of Padua. Antonini is a lawyer as well and authorized to practice at the Supreme Court of Cassation.

Antonini was a member of the group of experts who dealt, on behalf of the Veneto Region, with the Italian government for the recognition of more forms of autonomy.

He also represented the Veneto Region in front the Constitutional Court in trying to overturn Italy's legislation on compulsory vaccination for children, embracing the stances of the Italian no-vaccine movement. On 22 June 2018 he reaffirmed his anti-vaccines beliefs in a message on Twitter, where he wondered on Twitter why the tetanus vaccine would need to be compulsory if tetanus itself is non-contagious.

On 19 July 2018 Antonini was elected by the Parliament as the judge of the Constitutional Court of Italy, with the votes of the Northern League, the Five Stars Movement, Forza Italia and Brothers of Italy. He sworn on 26 July 2018.

Antonini was among the signers of a petition to stop the Italian Parliament from approving the 2016 same-sex civil unions legislation, on the ground that the law would grant same-sex couples rights similar to marriage, that it would facilitate same-sex couples in having their children officially recognized as such, and that it would foster surrogacy for same-sex couples.

== Honour ==
- Italy: Knight Grand Cross of the Order of Merit of the Italian Republic (29 november 2018)
