= Giovanni Galloni =

Italian jurist and politician (1927–2018)

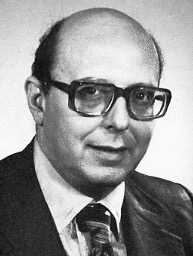

Vice-President of the High Council of Judiciary
- In office 29 July 1990 – 26 July 1994
- Preceded by: Cesare Mirabelli
- Succeeded by: Piero Alberto Capotosti

Minister of Public Education
- In office 28 July 1987 – 22 July 1989
- Prime Minister: Giovanni Goria; Ciriaco De Mita
- Preceded by: Franca Falcucci
- Succeeded by: Sergio Mattarella

Member of the Chamber of Deputies
- In office 5 June 1968 – 20 July 1990
- Constituency: Rome

Personal details
- Born: 16 June 1927 Paternò, Italy
- Died: 23 April 2018 (aged 90) Rome, Italy
- Party: Christian Democracy
- Occupation: Lawyer, politician, academic

Giovanni Galloni (16 June 1927 – 23 April 2018) was an Italian politician, Minister of Education and vice president of the High Council of the Judiciary.

== Biography ==
Born in Paternò, Sicily, Galloni graduated in law from the University of Bologna and taught Agricultural Law at the University of Naples Federico II, the University of Florence and the University of Rome Tor Vergata.

A member of the left-wing Christian Democracy Party, Galloni was elected to the Chamber of Deputies from 1968 to 1987 and was appointed Minister of Education in the Goria Cabinet and the following De Mita Cabinet.

In July 1990, Galloni left his seat at parliament after he was elected vice president of the CSM (High Council of the Judiciary, Italy) where he remained in office until 1994. During Galloni's term as vice president of the CSM, President Francesco Cossiga implemented several restrictions on the jurisdiction of the office of vice president. These restrictions were subsequently removed by his successor, President Oscar Luigi Scalfaro.

In 2002, the Faculty of Law of the University of Rome Tor Vergata (edited by Prof. Brunetto Guido Carpino ) dedicated to him the Scritti in onore di Giovanni Galloni with contributions from many of the students who trained under his teaching and from jurist friends.

Galloni died in Rome on 23 April 2018, at the age of 90.

== Electoral history ==
Election	House	Constituency	Party	Votes	Result
1963	Chamber of Deputies	Rome–Viterbo–Latina–Frosinone	DC	32,914	Not elected
1968	Chamber of Deputies	Rome–Viterbo–Latina–Frosinone	DC	66,363	Elected
1972	Chamber of Deputies	Rome–Viterbo–Latina–Frosinone	DC	75,805	Elected
1976	Chamber of Deputies	Rome–Viterbo–Latina–Frosinone	DC	74,029	Elected
1979	Chamber of Deputies	Rome–Viterbo–Latina–Frosinone	DC	74,386	Elected
1983	Chamber of Deputies	Rome–Viterbo–Latina–Frosinone	DC	68,916	Elected
1987	Chamber of Deputies	Rome–Viterbo–Latina–Frosinone	DC	74,732	Elected
