= Giovanni Maria Flick =

Italian judge (born 1940)

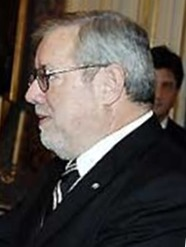

Minister of Justice
- In office 17 May 1996 – 21 October 1998
- Prime Minister: Romano Prodi
- Preceded by: Vincenzo Caianiello
- Succeeded by: Oliviero Diliberto

President of the Constitutional Court
- In office 14 November 2008 – 18 February 2009
- Preceded by: Franco Bile
- Succeeded by: Francesco Amirante

Judge of the Constitutional Court
- In office 18 February 2000 – 18 February 2009
- Appointed by: Carlo Azeglio Ciampi
- Preceded by: Giuliano Vassalli
- Succeeded by: Paolo Grossi

Personal details
- Born: 7 November 1940 (age 86) Cirié, Italy
- Party: Democratic Centre (2013–present)
- Other political affiliations: Independent (1996–2013)
- Education: Catholic University of Milan
- Profession: Jurist

Giovanni Maria Flick (born 7 November 1940) is an Italian journalist, politician, and jurist.

== Career ==
Flick was born in Cirié, Piedmont, to a Catholic, half-ethnic German family, as the fifth of seven children.

He began his education at the Jesuit liceo, and gained a diploma in law at the Università Cattolica del Sacro Cuore in Milan. He then practiced (1964–1975) at the Rome tribunal, as a judge, then as a prosecutor, was a professor at the University of Perugia, the University of Messina, and, from 1980, the LUISS University of Rome, and also started a career as a lawyer. He contributed editorials to Il Sole 24 Ore and La Stampa.

He was Minister of Justice in Romano Prodi's cabinet in 1996–1998, and presented the Italian Parliament with projects of organic laws meant to implement major judicial reforms which were almost entirely adopted by 1999 (including laws that made sentencing easier for misdemeanors). His experience as Minister got him named Italian representative to the European Commission of Human Rights, during the second Massimo D'Alema cabinet. In 2000, he was chosen by President Carlo Azeglio Ciampi to the office of judge in the Constitutional Court of Italy.
