= Vittorio Bachelet =

Italian academic and politician (1926–1980)

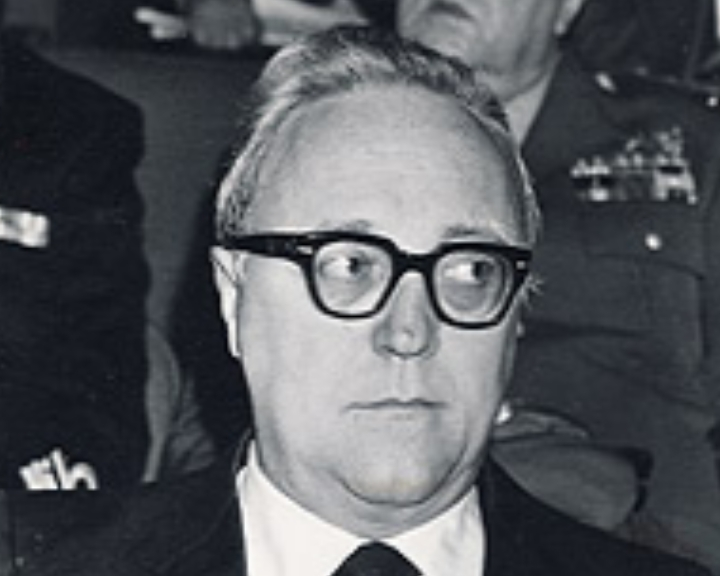

Vice-President of the Superior Council of Magistracy
- In office 21 December 1976 – 12 February 1980
- President: Giovanni Leone; Sandro Pertini
- Preceded by: Giacinto Bosco
- Succeeded by: Ugo Ziletti

Personal details
- Born: 20 February 1926 Rome, Italy
- Died: 12 February 1980 (aged 53) Rome, Italy
- Cause of death: Murder by shooting
- Party: Christian Democracy
- Occupation: Academic, politician

Vittorio Bachelet (Italian pronunciation: [vitˈtɔːrjo baʃʃeˈlɛ]; 20 February 1926 – 12 February 1980) was an Italian academic and politician, former vice president of the High Council of the Judiciary.

On 12 February 1980, he was ambushed and murdered by the Red Brigades.

== Biography ==
After having attended the Azione Cattolica association, Bachelet joined the Italian Catholic Federation of University Students and graduated in Law at the Sapienza University of Rome, where he later taught. He also taught in other Universities in Pavia and Trieste.

In 1959, Bachelet was appointed vice president of Azione Cattolica by Pope John XXIII, while in 1964 he was appointed President by Pope Paul VI.

Bachelet joined Christian Democracy, being very close to Aldo Moro, and in 1976 was elected vice president of the High Council of the Judiciary (elected by all the political parties in the Parliament), after having been for a few months a city councilor in Rome.

On 12 February 1980, at the end of a lesson, while talking with his assistant Rosy Bindi, Bachelet was shot and killed by an armed group of the Red Brigades, on the mezzanine of the staircase of the Faculty of Political Sciences of La Sapienza. His funeral took place two days later at the San Roberto Bellarmino Church and was attended by President Sandro Pertini and Prime minister Francesco Cossiga.

He was the father of Giovanni Battista Bachelet, teacher of Physics at La Sapienza and Deputy for the Democratic Party from 2008 to 2013.
