= Giuliano Vassalli =

Italian politician, lecturer, and lawyer (1915–2009)

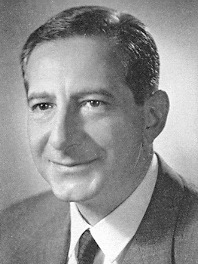

President of the Constitutional Court of Italy
- In office 11 November 1999 – 13 February 2000
- Preceded by: Renato Granata
- Succeeded by: Cesare Mirabelli

Minister of Justice
- In office 29 July 1987 – 2 February 1991
- Prime Minister: Giovanni Goria; Ciriaco De Mita; Giulio Andreotti
- Preceded by: Virginio Rognoni
- Succeeded by: Claudio Martelli

Member of the Senate of the Republic
- In office 12 July 1983 – 1 July 1987

Member of the Chamber of Deputies
- In office 5 June 1968 – 24 May 1972

Personal details
- Born: 25 April 1915 Perugia, Kingdom of Italy
- Died: 21 October 2009 (aged 94) Rome, Italy
- Party: Italian Socialist Party

Giuliano Vassalli (25 April 1915 – 21 October 2009) was an Italian politician, lecturer and lawyer.

== Life ==
He was born in Perugia, son of Filippo Vassalli, a famous lecturer and lawyer. During World War II, Vassalli was imprisoned by Nazi forces in Rome and subjected to torture in the prison of via Tasso. Pope Pius XII intervened personally on his behalf and was able to have his life spared.

=== Political career ===
After 1945, Vassalli joined the Italian Socialist Party (PSI). From 1968 to 1972, he was a member of the Chamber of Deputies, and then from 1983 to 1987 a member of the Senate of the Republic for the PSI. In 1987, Giovanni Goria named him Italian Minister of Justice; he was confirmed along with Ciriaco De Mita and Giulio Andreotti. During this time, he approved a new proceeding criminal code.

President Francesco Cossiga appointed him to the Constitutional Court of Italy on 4 February 1991 and was swore in nine days after. He was vice-president of the court from 1996 to 1999 under Renato Granata, and president of the Constitutional Court of Italy from 11 November 1999 to 13 February 2000.

=== Retirement ===
Although in his later years Vassalli retired from public life, he was sometimes asked for his advice. In December 2001, together with Vincenzo Caianiello, Vassalli issued a legal opinion opposing the proposed framework decision on the European Arrest Warrant, arguing that it was incompatible with the Italian constitutional order.
