= Giorgio Lattanzi =

Italian judge (born 1939)

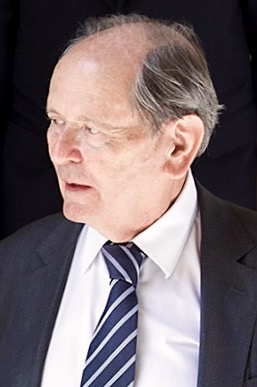

President of the Constitutional Court of Italy
- In office 8 March 2018 – 9 December 2019
- Preceded by: Paolo Grossi
- Succeeded by: Marta Cartabia

Vice President of the Constitutional Court of Italy
- In office 12 November 2014 – 8 March 2018

Judge of the Constitutional Court of Italy
- In office 9 December 2010 – 9 December 2019
- Appointed by: Court of Cassation

Personal details
- Born: 26 January 1939 (age 87) Rome, Italy

Giorgio Lattanzi (born 26 January 1939) is an Italian judge. He was judge of the Constitutional Court of Italy from 9 December 2010 to 9 December 2019 and president from 8 March 2018 until the end of his mandate.

== Career ==
Lattanzi was born in Rome on 26 January 1939. Under Minister Giuliano Vassalli Lattanzi was tasked with leading the commission working on the new Italian Code of Criminal Procedure.

Before his appointment to the Constitutional Court Lattanzi served as President of Section of the Court of Cassation. He was appointed by the Court of Cassation to the Constitutional Court on 19 November 2010, and sworn into office on 9 December 2010. He was elected vice president of the court on 12 November 2014. On 8 March 2018 Lattanzi was elected president, he received 12 votes in favour and one blank. In October 2019 the Constitutional Court received severe criticism from political leaders Matteo Salvini and Nicola Zingaretti for a ruling regarding the rights of Mafia-related convicts sentenced to life imprisonment. Lattanzi indicated that the criticism reached unacceptable levels, stating that "criticism is one thing, an attack is another." On 9 December 2019 Lattanzi's term in the Constitutional Court ended and he was succeeded as president by Marta Cartabia.

Lattanzi was made Knight Grand Cross in the Order of Merit of the Italian Republic on 24 October 2011.

Legal offices
Preceded by Paolo Grossi	President of the Constitutional Court of Italy; 2018–2019	Succeeded by Marta Cartabia
