= Giuliano Amato =

Italian politician (born 1938)

Giuliano Amato OMRI GCMG
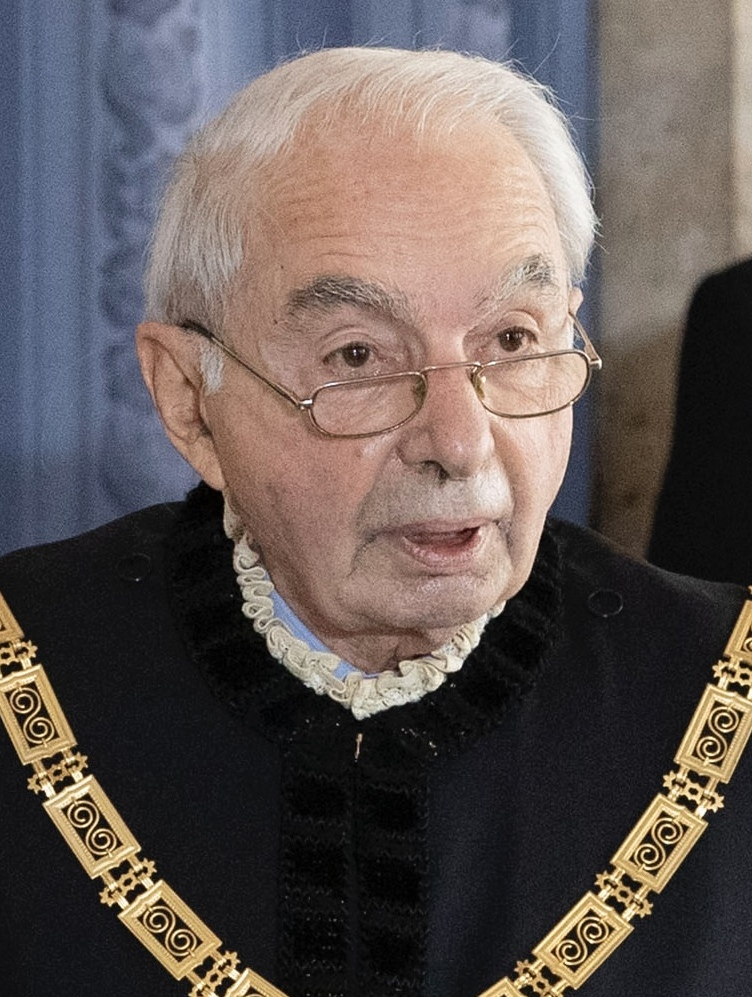
- Giuliano Amato in 2022

Prime Minister of Italy
- In office 26 April 2000 – 11 June 2001
- President: Carlo Azeglio Ciampi
- Preceded by: Massimo D'Alema
- Succeeded by: Silvio Berlusconi
- In office 28 June 1992 – 29 April 1993
- President: Oscar Luigi Scalfaro
- Preceded by: Giulio Andreotti
- Succeeded by: Carlo Azeglio Ciampi

Deputy Prime Minister of Italy
- In office 29 July 1987 – 13 April 1988
- Prime Minister: Giovanni Goria
- Preceded by: Arnaldo Forlani
- Succeeded by: Gianni De Michelis
Judiciary offices
President of the Constitutional Court of Italy
In office 29 January 2022 – 18 September 2022
| Preceded by | Giancarlo Coraggio |
| Succeeded by | Silvana Sciarra |
Judge of the Constitutional Court of Italy
In office 18 September 2013 – 18 September 2022
| Appointed by | Giorgio Napolitano |
| Preceded by | Franco Gallo |
| Succeeded by | Marco D'Alberti |
Ministerial offices
Minister of the Interior
In office 17 May 2006 – 8 May 2008
| Prime Minister | Romano Prodi |
| Preceded by | Giuseppe Pisanu |
| Succeeded by | Roberto Maroni |
Minister of Treasury, Budget and Economic Programming
In office 13 May 1999 – 26 April 2000
| Prime Minister | Massimo D'Alema |
| Preceded by | Carlo Azeglio Ciampi |
| Succeeded by | Vincenzo Visco |
Minister for Institutional Reforms
In office 21 October 1998 – 13 May 1999
| Prime Minister | Massimo D'Alema |
| Preceded by | Franco Bassanini |
| Succeeded by | Antonio Maccanico |
Minister of Treasury
In office 29 July 1987 – 23 July 1989
| Prime Minister | Giovanni Goria; Ciriaco De Mita |
| Preceded by | Giovanni Goria |
| Succeeded by | Guido Carli |
Secretary of the Council of Ministers
In office 4 August 1983 – 18 April 1987
| Prime Minister | Bettino Craxi |
| Preceded by | Bruno Orsini |
| Succeeded by | Mauro Bubbico |
Parliamentary offices
Member of the Chamber of Deputies
In office 28 April 2006 – 28 April 2008
| Constituency | Tuscany |
In office 12 July 1983 – 14 April 1994
| Constituency | Turin (1983–1992); Siena (1992–1994) |
Member of the Senate of the Republic
In office 30 May 2001 – 27 April 2006
| Constituency | Grosseto |

Personal details
- Born: 13 May 1938 (age 88) Turin, Piedmont, Kingdom of Italy
- Party: PSI (before 1964; 1972–1994); PSIUP (1964–1972); Independent (1994–2007; since 2008); PD (2007–2008)
- Height: 1.68 m (5 ft 6 in)
- Spouse: Diana Vincenzi
- Children: 2
- Education: University of Pisa; Sant'Anna School of Advanced Studies; Columbia University

Giuliano Amato OMRI (Italian pronunciation: [dʒuˈljaːno aˈmaːto]; born 13 May 1938) is an Italian politician who twice served as Prime Minister of Italy, first from 1992 to 1993 and again from 2000 to 2001. Upon Arnaldo Forlani's death in July 2023, Amato became the country's earliest-serving surviving Prime Minister.

Later, he was Vice President of the Convention on the Future of Europe that drafted the European Constitution and headed the Amato Group. He is commonly nicknamed dottor Sottile, which means "Doctor Subtilis", the sobriquet of the Scottish Medieval philosopher John Duns Scotus, a reference to his political subtlety. From 2006 to 2008, he was the Minister of the Interior in Romano Prodi's government. He served on the Constitutional Court of Italy from September 2013 to September 2022, to which he was appointed by President Giorgio Napolitano. He also served as President of the Court from 29 January 2022 to 18 September 2022.

== Biography ==
Born in Turin into a Sicilian family, Amato grew up in Tuscany. He received a first degree in law from the University of Pisa in 1960 while attending the prestigious Collegio Medico-Giuridico of the Scuola Normale Superiore, which today is the Sant'Anna School of Advanced Studies. As a Fulbright grantee, he received a master's degree in comparative law from Columbia Law School in 1963. After teaching at the Universities of Modena, Perugia and Florence, he worked as professor of Italian and Comparative Constitutional Law at the University of Rome La Sapienza from 1975 to 1997.

Amato began his political career in 1958 when he joined the Italian Socialist Party (PSI). He opposed the party's decision in 1963 to form a government with the Christian Democrats and break with the Italian Communist Party, thus choosing to join the left-wing breakaway that became the Italian Socialist Party of Proletarian Unity (PSIUP), led by historical figures of the socialist left.

With the dissolution of the PSIUP in 1972, Amato rejoined the PSI and aligned with members of the party's internal left wing and Marxist formation, such as Antonio Giolitti and Giorgio Ruffolo. In 1983, he was elected for the PSI to the Chamber of Deputies, serving until 1994. He was Undersecretary of State to the Prime Minister's office from 1983 to 1987, Deputy Prime Minister from 1987 to 1988, and Minister for the Treasury from 1987 to 1989.

From June 1992 to April 1993, Amato served as Prime Minister. During those ten months, a series of corruption scandals rocked Italy and swept away almost an entire class of political leaders. Amato himself was never implicated, notwithstanding how close he was to Bettino Craxi, a central figure in the corruption system. As Prime Minister, Amato responded effectively to two devaluations of the lira in the wake of currency speculation that led Italy to be expelled from the European Monetary System by cutting the budget deficit drastically, thus taking the first steps in the road that would bring Italy to adopt the Euro.

At one point, his government was harshly criticised because of a decree that suddenly moved the competence for corruption investigations into the hands of the police, which, being controlled directly by the government, would not have been independent. Fearing that the new system would have effectively blocked investigations of political corruption, Italians took to the streets in massive, spontaneous rallies. President Oscar Luigi Scalfaro refused to sign the decree, deeming it blatantly unconstitutional. While his Justice Minister Giovanni Conso took the blame, it has been disputed whether Amato was a victim of circumstances or whether he wanted to save the corruption-ridden system.

At the end of his period as Prime Minister, Amato gave a speech to the Parliament in which he solemnly promised that at the end of his term, he would retire from politics, stressing that his was a true commitment and that he would not break this promise as some politicians (whom he characterized as "mandarins") used to do. However, this promise was short-lived; Amato has regularly come under criticism for having made such a solemn commitment and failing to keep it.

Amato was President of the Italian antitrust authority from November 1994 to December 1997, Minister for Institutional Reforms in Massimo D'Alema's first government from October 1998 to May 1999, and, once again, Treasury Minister in D'Alema's second government from December 1999 to April 2000. Amato was nearly nominated for the Presidency of the Republic and was a close contender to replace Michel Camdessus as head of the International Monetary Fund.

Amato served as Prime Minister again from April 2000 to May 2001. He promoted economic competitiveness as well as social protection. In addition to economic reforms, he pushed ahead with political and institutional reforms, trying to deal with a weak executive and fragmented legislature.

In December 2001, European Union leaders at the European Council in Laeken appointed Amato and former Belgian Prime Minister Jean-Luc Dehaene to be Vice Presidents of the Convention on the Future of Europe to assist former French President Valéry Giscard d'Estaing in the drafting of the new European Constitution. He was elected a Foreign Honorary Member of the American Academy of Arts and Sciences in 2002.

Amato was a Member of the Senate representing the constituency of Grosseto in Tuscany from 2001 to 2006. In 2006, he was elected to the Chamber of Deputies for the Olive Tree list, and he was named Minister of the Interior in Romano Prodi's centre-left government.

Since 2010, he has also led advanced seminar classes at the Master in International Public Affairs of the LUISS School of Government.

On 12 September 2013, President Giorgio Napolitano appointed Amato as judge on the Constitutional Court of Italy, where he has served since then. On 16 September 2020 Amato ran for the position of President of the Constitutional Court, but lost in the second round of voting against Mario Rosario Morelli who obtained nine votes, while Giancarlo Coraggio obtained five and Amato received one. He was subsequently made Vice President by Morelli. He was confirmed in this position by Coraggio who became president in December 2020.

Amato is married to Diana Vincenzi, a professor of Family Law at the University of Rome. They have two children, Elisa and Lorenzo, and five grandchildren, Giulia, Marco, Simone, Elena and Irene. As of September 2020, Amato is a member of the Italian Aspen Institute.

== World Justice Project ==
Giuliano Amato serves as an Honorary Co-chair for the World Justice Project. The World Justice Project works to lead a global, multidisciplinary effort to strengthen the Rule of Law for the development of communities of opportunity and equity.

== President of Sant'Anna School of Advanced Studies ==
In 2012 Giuliano Amato was appointed President of the Sant'Anna School of Advanced Studies. As alumnus of Sant'Anna School of Advanced Studies (attending the prestigious Collegio Medico-Giuridico of the Scuola Normale Superiore di Pisa, which today is Sant'Anna School of Advanced Studies), he guarded close contact with the university, previously heading Sant'Anna Alumni Association.

He was appointed President of the Sant'Anna School of Advanced Studies on 21 February 2012 by the Academic Senate of Sant'Anna School of Advanced Studies and by a Decree of the Minister Francesco Profumo of the Ministry of Education, Universities and Research (Italy). He resigned from his post at the Sant'Anna School of Advanced Studies after being appointed to the Constitutional Court in September 2013.

== Personal views ==
In 2011, Amato declared that Italian creativity is not supported by adequate efficiency in organising its public and private entities. He believes it had a role in the lost hope in the future and in the sense of a common national identity, as well as it had not yet been perfected as a whole in a way that was congruent with its essence. That loss had favoured the flourishing of xenophobia and purported regional identities, such as the Lega Nord movement.

Amato thinks that the brigandage in Southern Italy after 1861 was an unfair and unlawful movement that cannot be seen as a form of anti-national rebellion; however, the soldiers and the officials of the Borbonic Army who joined the movement cannot be defined as betrayers of the ongoing Italy. It is also not credible that the Expedition of the Thousand could have caused the annexation of the Southern Italy to the Kingdom of Sardinia by itself, while the main political and cultural foundations had been thrown by the works of intellectuals like Francesco Mario Pagano and Vincenzo Cuoco produced in the 1790s. If he did not believe the national identity is always something more important than sub-national or sovereign-national ones, Amato believes in the multi-layer identities model proposed by Alberto Banti, in a way that the European identity strengthens the Italian identity even when they live and work in a foreign country. According to him, the Italian identity is kept alive in any country in which they have gone.

== Electoral history ==
| Election | House | Constituency | Party | Votes | Result |
|---|---|---|---|---|---|
| 1983 | Chamber of Deputies | Turin–Novara–Vercelli | PSI | 32,525 | Elected |
| 1987 | Chamber of Deputies | Turin–Novara–Vercelli | PSI | 50,816 | Elected |
| 1992 | Chamber of Deputies | Siena–Arezzo–Grosseto | PSI | 32,961 | Elected |
| 2001 | Senate of the Republic | Grosseto | Ulivo | 83,805 | Elected |
| 2006 | Chamber of Deputies | Tuscany | Ulivo | – (Note: Elected in a closed list proportional representation system.) | Elected |

=== First-past-the-post elections ===
2001 general election (S): Tuscany — Grosseto
| Candidate | Coalition | Votes | % |
|---|---|---|---|
| Giuliano Amato | The Olive Tree | 83,805 | 48.1 |
| Franco Mugnai | House of Freedoms | 73,921 | 42.4 |
| Others | | 16,437 | 9.5 |
| Total | | 174,163 | 100.0 |

== Honour ==
- Italy: Knight Grand Cross of the Order of Merit of the Italian Republic (23 December 2011)

Political offices
| Preceded by Bruno Orsini | Secretary of the Council of Ministers; 1983–1987 | Succeeded by Mauro Bubbico |
| Preceded by Arnaldo Forlani | Deputy Prime Minister of Italy; 1987–1988 | Succeeded by Gianni De Michelis |
| Preceded by Giovanni Goria | Minister of Treasury; 1987–1989 | Succeeded by Guido Carli |
| Preceded by Giulio Andreotti | Prime Minister of Italy; 1992–1993 | Succeeded by Carlo Azeglio Ciampi |
| Preceded by Franco Bassanini | Minister for Institutional Reforms; 1998–1999 | Succeeded by Antonio Maccanico |
| Preceded by Carlo Azeglio Ciampi | Minister of Treasury, Budget and Economic Programming; 1999–2000 | Succeeded by Vincenzo Visco |
| Preceded by Massimo D'Alema | Prime Minister of Italy; 2000–2001 | Succeeded by Silvio Berlusconi |
| Preceded by Giuseppe Pisanu | Minister of the Interior; 2006–2008 | Succeeded by Roberto Maroni |
Legal offices
| Preceded by Franco Gallo | Judge of the Constitutional Court of Italy; 2013–2022 | Succeeded by Marco D'Alberti |
| Preceded by Giancarlo Coraggio | President of the Constitutional Court of Italy; 2022 | Succeeded by Silvana Sciarra |
