= Giovanni Pitruzzella =

Italian jurist

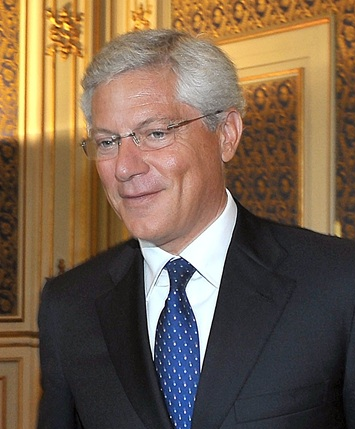
- Pitruzzella in 2011

Judge of the Constitutional Court of Italy
- Incumbent
- Assumed office 14 November 2023
- Appointed by: Sergio Mattarella

Advocate General at the European Court of Justice
- Incumbent
- Assumed office 8 October 2018

Personal details
- Born: 15 July 1959 (age 67) Palermo, Italy
- Education: University of Palermo
- Profession: Academic, lawyer

Giovanni Pitruzzella (born 15 July 1959) is an Italian jurist and academic who has served as a Judge of the Constitutional Court of Italy since 14 November 2023. He concurrently serves as an Advocate General at the Court of Justice of the European Union (CJEU), a position he has held since October 2018.

== Biography ==
Pitruzzella graduated in law from the University of Palermo in March 1982.

Between 1986 and 1994 he was a professor associate of public law institutions in the Faculty of Political Sciences of the University of Cagliari and from 1994 to 1997 full professor of constitutional law in the Faculty of Law of the same university. Since 1998, he has been a full professor of constitutional law at the University of Palermo as well as a professor in the School of Specialization in European law.

He works as a cassation lawyer. Expert in public procurement law, constitutional justice, regional public law, and public economic law, he has held numerous positions including that of legal consultant both at the Presidency of the Council of Ministers, the President of the Sicily, and the Sicilian Regional Assembly. Between 1998 and 2002, he was president of the "Joint Commission for the determination of the implementation rules of the Sicilian special statute".

On 18 November 2011, he was president of the Italian Competition Authority to replace Antonio Catricalà, who resigned following his appointment as undersecretary to the Presidency of the Council of the Monti government. Pitruzzella took office on 29 November 1011 and remained in office until 30 September 2018.

Pitruzzella was appointed as the Advocate General at the European Court of Justice on 8 October 2018 for a six-year term. He was reappointed for a second term in 2023 which will end on 6 October 2030.

On 10 November 2023, President of the Republic Sergio Mattarella appointed him, together with Antonella Sciarrone Alibrandi, as a Judge of the Constitutional Court. He was sworn in on 14 November 2023.

== See also ==
- List of members of the European Court of Justice

Legal offices
Preceded by TBD	Judge of the Constitutional Court of Italy; 2023–present	Incumbent
