= Vincenzo Caianiello =

Italian politician

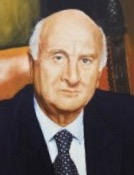

Minister of Justice
- In office February 16, 1996 – May 17, 1996
- Prime Minister: Lamberto Dini
- Preceded by: Lamberto Dini
- Succeeded by: Giovanni Maria Flick

Personal details
- Born: 2 October 1932 Caserta, Italy
- Died: 26 April 2002 (aged 69) Rome, Italy
- Profession: Jurist; Politician

Vincenzo Caianiello (2 October 1932 – 26 April 2002) was an Italian jurist, member of the Constitutional Court of Italy from October 23, 1986, to October 23, 1995.

Born in Aversa, Campania, he was the president of the Constitutional Court from September 9, 1995, to the end of his term in office. His term was the shortest of any president of the Court. In January 1996 he became Minister of Justice in Lamberto Dini's government and resigned from office in May of same year. He was awarded the Knight Grand Cross of the Order of Merit of the Italian Republic in 1982.

After resigning, he taught Administrative Law at Luiss University. Caianiello died in Rome in 2002.

== Biography ==
A law Jurisprudence, he worked at a very young age as an official in the Ministry of the Interior (Italy) in the 1950s. He was later the winner of the competition for ordinary magistracy, serving in the Court of Udine. From the ordinary judiciary he passed by competition to the Court of Auditors in 1963.

He was then first runner-up in the 1965 competition as a referendary to the Council of state. As an administrative magistrate he was a member of the Plenary Assembly of the Council of State and president of the Regional Administrative Tribunal of Umbria, Tuscany and the second external section of the Lazio Regional Administrative Tribunal.

In the late 1970s he was chief of staff to Ministers Bucalossi, Gava and La Malfa and directed the Legislative Office of the Presidency of the Council of Ministers (Italy) in the first and Second Spadolini government.

He returned to the Council of state and assumed the chairmanship of the 6th Jurisdictional Section.

He was elected judge of the Constitutional Court of Italy by the full Italian Parliament on Oct. 9, 1986, and sworn in the following Oct. 23; he was elected president on September 8, 1995, and held office from the next day. He ceased to hold office just one month later due to expiration of his term as a judge, on October 23, 1995.

After leaving the judiciary, he devoted himself to university teaching (full professor of Administrative Law at Luiss University) and academic activity, also registering as a lawyer but not accepting defense assignments in court, feeling that he was basically a judge.

Shortly after the end of his term on the Constitutional Court, he was appointed minister of grace and justice in the Dini government, following a no-confidence vote against Filippo Mancuso and an interim by Lamberto Dini himself. He held the post briefly, until after the 1996 Italian general election.

He died while still in the midst of work, from a short and sudden illness in 2002. The state funeral was held at St. Clare Parish, officiated by Fr. Gianni Todescato, with the participation of the President of the Republic.

Political offices
Preceded by Lamberto Dini	Italian Minister of Justice; 1996	Succeeded by Giovanni Maria Flick
