= High Council of the Judiciary (Italy) =

Italian institution

Coordinates: 41.9045°N 12.5032°E

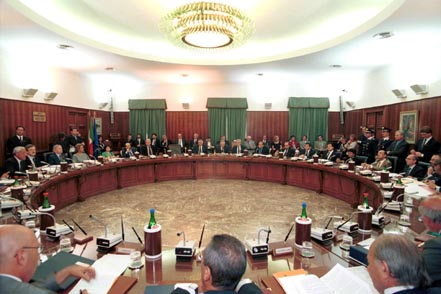
Chamber of the High Council of the Judiciary

The High Council of the Judiciary (Italian: Consiglio superiore della magistratura, or CSM) is an Italian institution of constitutional importance, entrusted to preside over the organisation of the Italian Judiciary. The High Council sits in the Palazzo dei Marescialli, Piazza Indipendenza 6, Rome.

== History ==
The origins of the Council can be traced back to the enactment of Law no. 511 in 1907. Article 4 of this legislation mandated the establishment of the Council, concurrent with the formation of the Ministry of Justice. Primarily envisioned as a consultative body, the Council was tasked with significant administrative responsibilities, notably in appointing key personnel within the judiciary. Several months subsequent to the initial legislation, the government under Giovanni Giolitti enacted Law no. 689 of 1907, which delineated the structure and function of the new council. Ostensibly established to administer the judiciary on behalf of the King of Italy, the arrangement of the Council's members indicated a clear dependency on the government.

The operational scope of the Council remained predominantly consistent until the adoption of the Constitution of the Italian Republic in 1948. The constitutional change marked the shift from an administrative organe, with consultative attributions, from the current self-governing institution of the Italian judiciary, entrusted with constitutional attributions.

== Status ==
The High Council is a self-governing institution in order to insure the autonomy and independence of the judiciary from the other branches of the state, particularly the executive, according to the principle of the separation of powers expressed in the Italian Constitution. The Council is an "Institution of constitutional importance" (Organi di rilievo costituzionale) as confirmed by the Constitutional Court, since it is referred to by the Italian Constitution.

For many years it was disputed as to whether the High Council was a "Constitutional Institution" or merely an "Institution of Constitutional Importance" and the identification of specific problems with the Council was very problematic. In fact, the performance of some powers and functions by the Council, which are not explicitly mentioned in the Constitution, has often caused political tensions. These include the "functions of representation of the judicial power in interactions with other powers", like, for example, making proposals to the Minister of Justice on matters under his or her control, giving opinions on the drafting of laws relating to the judiciary and generally pronouncing its opinion on any matter relating to the functioning of the judiciary.

== Functions ==
Article 110 of the Constitution assigns the task of "the organisation and the running of services relating to the judiciary" to the Ministry of Justice, notwithstanding the powers of the High Council. However, article 101.2 guarantees the full autonomy and independence of judges from all other powers, saying that they "are subject only to the laws." The High Council is the institution which ensures the autonomy of the judiciary, with responsibility for the Criminal and Civil branches of the Ordinary Judiciary.

The Council has competence in matters relating to the criminal and civil judges (judges in the administrative, auditing and military courts have their own governing institutions, which are distinct from the High Council). These matters are:

- appointment of magistrates (always through a public examination);
- assignment of magistrates to a specific role;
- promotions;
- transfers;
- subsidies for magistrates and their families;
- appointment of magistrates to the Supreme Court of Cassation
- appointment and removal of honorary magistrates.

The law establishing the Council allows the Minister of Justice to make requests and observations on matters under the Council's control; the minister can participate in sessions of the Council when asked by the President or when the minister considers it appropriate to communicate with it. The minister also has the power to present information to the heads of the courts about the functioning of the judiciary and to express agreement on the nominations of heads of judicial offices. Although the minister of Justice can suggest disciplinary action, it is up to the Council to decide whether to follow the suggestions of the minister.

At the prompting of the minister of Justice, the Council has the power to identify disadvantaged locations in order to consider the transfer of judges to those locations. This means that the transfer may not have been requested by the judge (although they may have indicated their agreement or availability) and that the Council determines the disposition of magistrates in disadvantaged locations. The transfer must involve a change of Region and the new location must be more than a hundred and fifty kilometres from the location where the judge was trained or worked previously. The judicial offices considered to be "disadvantaged" are those of Basilicata, Calabria, Sicily, and Sardinia, where there has been a failure to fill the places available by examination, more than 50% of staff positions are unfilled, there is a high crime rate (especially related to organised crime), and a high rate of civil cases for the district's size and the number of staff.

Appeal against these decisions can be made to the Regional Administrative Tribunal of Lazio in the first instance and the Council of State in the second instance. Appeal against disciplinary sanctions is through a separate process which includes eventual appeal to the court of cassation.

== Political role ==
There is often controversy when the Council intervenes in the political sphere, on the grounds of protecting the independence and autonomy of the judiciary from external attacks, and when the Council passes regulatory acts. There have been political attempts to limit the Council's ability to make regulations, such as the constitutional reform proposals of Massimo D'Alema (which were never approved).

The Council has no right to make political pronouncements and therefore has no political role, strictly speaking, and does not establish or pursue any political objectives. However, under the constitution, the Council does have the role of governing the judiciary and protecting its autonomy and independence. Thus the Council has been accused by some politicians of playing a role which the constitution does not give it, extending its powers in order to conflict with those of Parliament and the Government.

Criticism focusses on two types of activity of the Council:

- The so-called "Papers for Protection" (pratiche a tutela) with which the Council intervenes to defend magistrates experiencing criticism for their judicial activities which it considers unfair;
- The "Opinions" (pareri) on draft laws being considered by the Italian Parliament, produced without request.

Especially when these express critical views of legislative activity, the reactions of the government and parliamentarians is very lively. In particular it is claimed that such activities are unconstitutional and indicate the Council's desire to make itself a "third chamber" (terza camera) of Parliament.

Individual members of the Council and the National Association of Magistrates often speak in defence of the Council's actions in these situations.

Defence of the "Papers for Protection" claims that citizens' right to discuss and criticise judicial decisions should not extend to the delegitimisation of the judge who has issued the decision and that the autonomous governing institution of the judiciary ought to intervene to protect the autonomy and independence of the judiciary as a whole in these instances. The internal regulations of the Council, signed by the President of Italy in his role as President of the Council, explicitly permit the "papers for protection."

With respect to the "Opinions", the law which established the Council expressly states that the Council "should give opinions to the Minister on draft laws concerning the arrangement of the judiciary, the administration of justice and anything else relating to the aforementioned in any way." Proponents argue that the Council ought therefore to express its opinions to the Minister of Justice so that they may take account of them in their discussions in Parliament. Critics argue that the "opinions" violate the separation of powers by intervening in the legislative process.

== Composition ==
Under the Constitution of the Italian Republic, the High Council of the Judiciary is presided by the President of the Republic. The First President of and the Prosecutor General at the Supreme Court of Cassation also possess a constitutional right to sit to the institution.

The remaining offices at the High Council of the Judiciary are elective. Whilst the Constitution does not specify the number of members who may partake in the council, it requires two-thirds of the members to be chosen amongst the judiciary (the so-called "togate members") and the other one-third to be designated by the Parliament, summoned in joint session, amongst university professors in law or lawyers registered with the bar for at least fourteen years (the so-called "lay members"). The elections of lay members is conceived as a check and balance mechanism, thereby ensuring that the judiciary abides by the best interests of the Italian people.

Likewise, the President of the Italian Republic presides over the Council's meeting, even though this role is more symbolic than endowed with substantive attributions. For carrying out the constitutional and legal attributions, the members of the High Council elect a vice-president among the lay members who is entrusted with all prerogatives of a chief councilor.

Since the Constitution does not resolve the number of members in the High Council of the Judiciary, this matter is regulated by ordinary law. Currently, there are sixteen togate members (of whom two are judges at the Court of Cassation, four are prosecutors, ten are trial judges), whereas lay members are eight, for a total of twenty-four elected members. Each elective member serves a four-year term and, upon ending term, they cannot be re-enter office immediately. Lay members cannot combine the functions of national or regional political representative with councilorship to High Council of the Judiciary.

== Current councilors ==
In its current composition, the High Council of the Judiciary is formed by twenty-four elective councilors (of whom eight lay members and sixteen togate members) plus three councilors with a constitutional right, namely, the President of the Italian Republic, the First President of and the Prosecutor General at the Court of Cassation. In total, twenty-seven councilors sit to the High Council of the Judiciary. Fabio Pinelli serves as the High Council of the Judiciary's vice-president.

Current lay members were elected by the Parliament, summoned in joint session, as from 17 January 2023.

- Ex Officio Members: President of the Italian Republic, Sergio Mattarella; First President of the Court of Cassation, Margherita Cassano; Prosecutor General at the Court of Cassation, Luigi Salvato.
- Lay Members: Isabella Bertolini; Daniela Bianchini (FdI); Rosanna Natoli (FdI); Felice Giuffrè (FdI); Fabio Pinelli (LSP); Claudia Eccher (LSP); Enrico Aimi (FI); Roberto Romboli (PD); Michele Papa (M5S); Ernesto Carbone (A-IV-RE).

Ordinary magistrates cast their ballots, for the election of togate members, on 18 and 19 September 2022.

- Councilors chosen among judges serving within the Supreme Court of Cassation: Paola d'Ovidio; Antonello Cosentino.
- Councilors chosen among public prosecutors serving within the Supreme Court of Cassation: Eligio Paolini; Roberto Fontana; Dario Scaletta; Marco Bisogni; Maurizio Carbone.
- Councilors chosen among trial and appellate judges and prosecutors: Andrea Mirenda; Marcello Basilico; Maria Vittoria Marchianò; Genantonio Chiarelli; Bernadette Nicotra; Tullio Morello; Maria Luisa Mazzola; Edoardo Cilenti; Domenica Miele; Michele Forziati; Mariafrancesca Abenavoli; Roberto D'Auria; Antonino Laganà.

== List of vice presidents ==
- 1959–1963 Michele De Pietro
- 1963–1967 Ercole Rocchetti
- 1967–1968 Adolfo Salminci
- 1968–1972 Alfredo Amatucci
- 1972–1976 Giacinto Bosco
- 1976–1980 Vittorio Bachelet
- 1980–1981 Ugo Zilletti
- 1981 Giovanni Conso
- 1981–1986 Giancarlo De Carolis
- 1986–1990 Cesare Mirabelli
- 1990–1994 Giovanni Galloni
- 1994–1996 Piero Alberto Capotosti
- 1996–1998 Carlo Federico Grosso
- 1998–2002 Giovanni Verde
- 2002–2006 Virginio Rognoni
- 2006–2010 Nicola Mancino
- 2010–2014 Michele Vietti
- 2014–2018 Giovanni Legnini
- 2018–2023 David Ermini
- Since 2023 Fabio Pinelli

== See also ==
- Italian referendums, 1987
- Italian referendum, 2000

== Bibliography ==
- Paolo Caretti and Ugo De Siervo Istituzioni di diritto pubblico Giappichelli Editore, 1996
- Edmondo Bruti Liberati, Livio Pepino, Autogoverno o controllo della magistratura? Il modello italiano di Consiglio superiore, Feltrinelli, Milano, 1998
- Elena Paciotti, Sui magistrati. La questione della giustizia in Italia, Laterza, Roma-Bari, 1999
- Stefano Livadiotti, Magistrati. L'ultracasta. Bompiani editore, 2009.
- Massimo Martinelli, La palude. Gremese Editore, 2008.
- Giancarlo Caselli, Assalto alla giustizia, Melampo, Milano, 2011
- Sergio Bartole, Il potere giudiziario, il Mulino, Bologna, 2012
- Giuseppe Di Federico (ed.), Ordinamento giudiziario: uffici giudiziari, CSM e governo della magistratura, Cedam, Padova, 2012
- Livia Pomodoro, Manuale di ordinamento giudiziario, Giappichelli, Torino, 2012
