= Elena Ornella Paciotti =

Italian politician

The Honourable Elena Ornella Paciotti
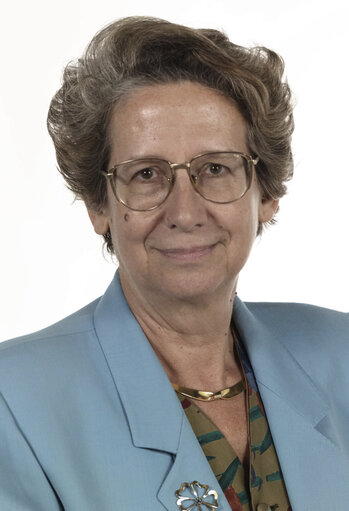

President of the Lelio and Lisli Basso Foundation for the Study of Contemporary Society
- Incumbent
- Assumed office 1999

President of Magistrates National Association
- In office 1994–1995

President of Magistrates National Association
- In office 1997–1998

Member of the European Parliament
- In office 13 June 1999 – 2004

Personal details
- Born: 9 January 1941 (age 85) Rome, Italy
- Party: Democratic Party of the Left (1999–present)
- Profession: magistrate; politician

Elena Paciotti (born Elena Ornella, 9 January 1941) is an Italian politician and magistrate. She was twice president of Magistrates National Association and a Member of the European Parliament for the Democratic Party of the Left.

Since 1999 she has also been a president of the Lelio and Lisli Basso Foundation for the Study of Contemporary Society.
