= Constitutional Court of Italy =

Highest court of Italy

Coordinates: 41.8991°N 12.4875°E

Constitutional Court

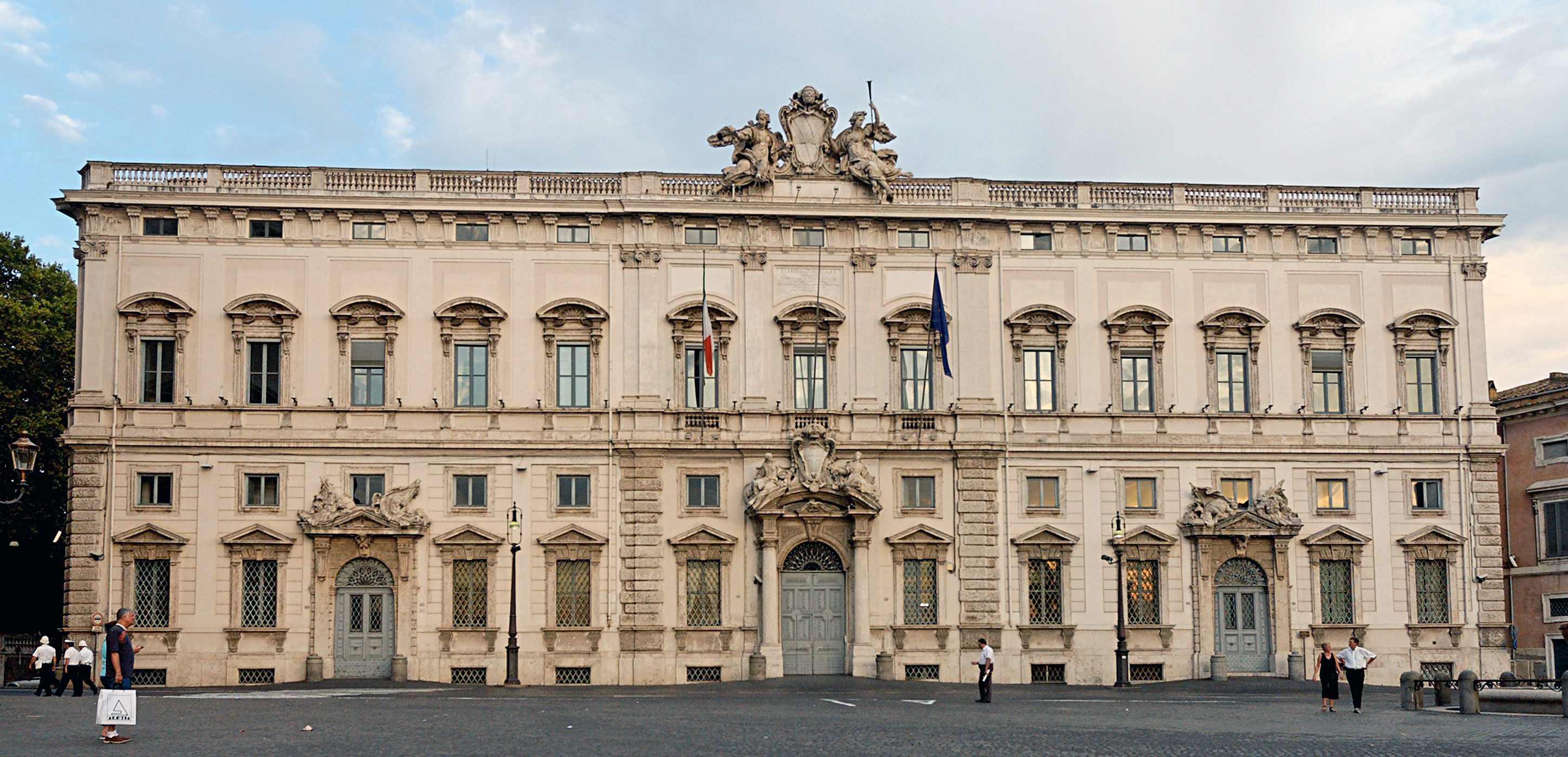
- Interactive map of Constitutional Court
- Established: 1948 (in the Constitution); 1955 (effective)
- Jurisdiction: Italy
- Location: Rome, Italy
- Composition method: Elected/appointed in equal portions by Italian Parliament, President of the Italian Republic, and highest Italian courts
- Authorised by: Constitution of Italy
- Judge term length: 9 years (not renewable)
- Number of positions: 15
- Website: Official website

President of the Court
- Currently: Giovanni Amoroso
- Since: 21 January 2025

The Constitutional Court of the Italian Republic (Italian: Corte costituzionale della Repubblica Italiana) is the highest court of Italy in matters of constitutional law. Sometimes, the name Consulta is used as a metonym for it, because its sessions are held in Palazzo della Consulta in Rome.

== History ==
The court is a post-World War II innovation, established by the republican Constitution of Italy in 1948, but it became operative only in 1955 after the enactment of the Constitutional Law n. 1 of 1953 and the Law n. 87 of 1953. It held its first hearing in 1956.

== Powers ==
According to Article 134 of the Italian Constitution, the Court shall pass judgement on:

- controversies on the constitutional legitimacy of laws issued by the State and Regions and when the Court declares a law unconstitutional, the law ceases to have effect the day after the publication of the ruling;
- conflicts arising from allocation of powers of the State and those powers allocated to State and Regions, and between Regions;
- charges brought against the President.

Additionally, a handful of constitutional laws were promulgated to regulate the powers and functionality of the Court during the years. The most important being constitutional law n. 1/1953, which, among other things, extends the power of reviewing and approving referendum's requests to the Court. (Art. 2)

The Constitutional Court passes on the constitutionality of laws with no right of appeal, as the Court is the highest court in relation to constitutional matters in Italy.

Since 12 October 2007, when the reform of the Italian intelligence agencies approved in August 2007 came into force, the pretext of state secret cannot be used to deny access to documents by the Court.

== Composition ==
The Constitutional Court is composed of 15 judges for the term of service of nine years: 5 appointed by the President of Italy, 5 elected by the Parliament of Italy and 5 elected by the ordinary and administrative supreme courts. Of those elected by the supreme courts, 3 are elected by the Supreme Court of Cassation of Italy (penal and civil justice), one is elected by the Court of Auditors of Italy, and one by the Council of State of Italy (supreme administrative court). Candidates need to be either lawyers with twenty years or more experience, full professors of law, or (even former) judges of the Supreme Administrative, Civil and Criminal tribunals. The members then elect the President of the Court. The President is elected from among its members in a secret ballot, by an absolute majority (8 votes in the case of a full court). If no person gets a majority, a runoff election between the two judges with the most votes occurs. The President of the Court appoints one or more vice-presidents to stand in for him in the event of his absence for any reason.

== Current membership ==
Appointed by

President of Italy Courts of Italy Parliament of Italy

Portrait	Name	Profession	Appointed by	Appointed on	Date sworn in	End of term	Type of membership
	Francesco Viganò (1966– )	University professor, lawyer	President (Sergio Mattarella)	24 February 2018	8 March 2018	8 March 2027	President (since 14 November 2026)
	Luca Antonini (1963– )	University professor, lawyer	Parliament (18th Legislature)	19 July 2018	26 July 2018	26 July 2027	Vice president (since 21 January 2025)
	Stefano Petitti (1953–)	Magistrate	Courts (Court of Cassation)	28 November 2019	10 December 2019	10 December 2028	Judge
	Angelo Buscema (1952– )	Magistrate	Courts (Court of Audit)	12 July 2020	15 September 2020	15 September 2029	Judge
	Emanuela Navarretta (1966– )	University professor	President (Sergio Mattarella)	9 September 2020	15 September 2020	15 September 2029	Judge
	Maria Rosaria San Giorgio (1952– )	Magistrate	Courts (Court of Cassation)	16 December 2020	17 December 2020	17 December 2029	Judge
	Filippo Patroni Griffi (1955– )	Magistrate	Courts (Council of State)	15 December 2021	29 January 2022	29 January 2031	Judge
	Marco D'Alberti (1948– )	University professor	President (Sergio Mattarella)	15 September 2022	20 September 2022	20 September 2031	Judge
	Giovanni Pitruzzella (1959– )	University professor, lawyer	President (Sergio Mattarella)	10 November 2023	14 November 2023	14 November 2032	Judge
	Antonella Sciarrone Alibrandi (1965– )	University professor	President (Sergio Mattarella)	10 November 2023	14 November 2023	14 November 2032	Judge
	Roberto Cassinelli (1956– )	Lawyer	Parliament (19th Legislature)	13 February 2025	19 February 2025	19 February 2034	Judge
	Massimo Luciani (1952– )	University professor, lawyer	Parliament (19th Legislature)	13 February 2025	19 February 2025	19 February 2034	Judge
	Francesco Saverio Marini (1973– )	University professor, lawyer	Parliament (19th Legislature)	13 February 2025	19 February 2025	19 February 2034	Judge
	Maria Alessandra Sandulli (1956– )	University professor, lawyer	Parliament (19th Legislature)	13 February 2025	19 February 2025	19 February 2034	Judge
Appointed judges
	Alberto Giusti (1961– )	Magistrate	Courts (Court of Cassation)	26 October 2026	16 November 2026	16 November 2035	Judge

== See also ==
- List of presidents of the Constitutional Court of Italy
- List of judges of the Constitutional Court of Italy
