= Order of precedence in Italy =

Relative preeminence of officials for ceremonial purposes

The Italian order of precedence is fixed by Decree of the President of the Council of Ministers (D.P.C.M.) of April 14, 2006 and of April 16, 2008. It is a hierarchy of officials in the Italian Republic used to direct protocol. The President, being head of state, is first, and the Prime Minister (President of the Council of Ministers), the head of government, is fifth.

1. The President of the Republic (Sergio Mattarella)
2. (Cardinals and princes of reigning dynasties - these officers cannot preside over the ceremony)
3. The President of the Senate of the Republic (Ignazio La Russa)
4. The President of the Chamber of Deputies (Lorenzo Fontana)
5. The President of the Council of Ministers (Prime-Minister) (Giorgia Meloni)
6. The President of the Constitutional Court (Giovanni Amoroso)
7. Former President of the Republic (None living)
8. Vice Presidents of the Senate of the Republic
  1. Anna Rossomando
  2. Gian Marco Centinaio
  3. Maria Domenica Castellone
  4. Licia Ronzulli
9. Vice Presidents of the Chamber of Deputies
  1. Sergio Costa
  2. Fabio Rampelli
  3. Giorgio Mulé
  4. Anna Ascani
10. Vice Presidents of the Council of Ministers
  1. Antonio Tajani
  2. Matteo Salvini
11. Vice Presidents of the Constitutional Court
  1. Franco Modugno
  2. Giulio Prosperetti
12. Ministers of the Republic
13. Judges of the Constitutional Court
14. Presidents of Regions
15. The First President of the Supreme Court of Cassation (Margherita Cassano)
16. The President of the National Council for Economics and Labour (Renato Brunetta)
17. Deputy Ministers of the Republic
18. Quaestors of the Senate and Chamber of Deputies, in order of seniority
19. Presidents of Parliamentary Commissions
20. The President of the Council of State (Luigi Maruotti)
21. The President of the Court of Accounts (Guido Carlino)
22. The Governor of the Central Bank of Italy (Fabio Panetta)
23. The General Prosecutor of the Supreme Court of Cassation (Luigi Salvato)
24. The Attorney General of the Republic (Gabriella Palmieri Sandulli)
25. The Chief of the Defence Staff
26. Senators and Deputies, in order of appointment
27. The President of the Accademia dei Lincei (Roberto Antonelli)
28. The President of the National Research Council (Maria Chiara Carrozza)
29. The President of the Superior Court of Public Waters
30. The Vice President of the Council of Military Courts
31. The Vice President of the High Council of the Judiciary
32. The Presidents of the Autonomous Provinces of Trentino and South Tyrol
33. The Deputy President of the Supreme Court of Cassation
34. Prefects, in their provinces
35. Mayors, in their cities
36. Presidents and General Prosecutors of the Court of Appeals
37. Presidents of Provinces, in their cities
38. Catholic Bishops, in their dioceses
39. The Chief of the Army Staff (Amm. Giuseppe Cavo Dragone)
40. The Chief of the Navy Staff (Amm. Sq. Enrico Credendino)
41. The Chief of the Air Staff (Gen. S.A. Luca Goretti)
42. The President of the Permanent conference of Rectors (Dr. Giovanna Iannantuoni, PhD)
43. Ambassadors, in order of establishment of diplomatic relations with their countries
