= Vito Cozzoli =

Italian business executive

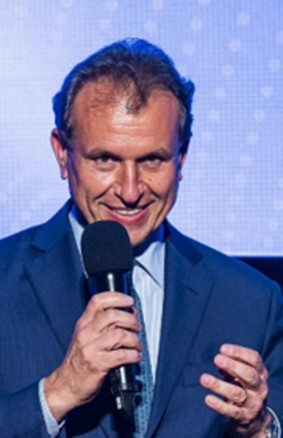
- Vito Cozzoli
- Born: 1964 (age 61–62)
- Education: Sapienza University of Rome
- Occupation: Business executive

Vito Cozzoli (born 1964, in Bari, Italy) is an Italian business executive. He has been chief executive officer of Autostrade dello Stato since April 2024. Previously, he served as president and CEO of Sport and Salute S.p.A. from March 2020 to August 2023.

== Biography ==
Vito Cozzoli obtained his Law degree from the La Sapienza University of Rome in 1988. His thesis was completed under the guidance of Professor Leopoldo Elia. In 1991, he succeeded in the public competition for the position of Parliamentary Official in the general professional category at the Chamber of Deputies. In 1992, he obtained his legal qualification from the Rome Bar Association and was registered in the Special List of Lawyers of the Chamber of Deputies. Subsequently, he commenced his professional career in the Chamber as a Parliamentary Official, where he contributed to various Commissions, including Constitutional Affairs, Transport, Post and Telecommunications, Justice, and Finance.

Since 1999, Vito Cozzoli has served as the Chief Service Official for the Secretary General, Ugo Zampetti. In 2006, he was appointed as Head of the Office of the Legal Counsel. Additionally, from 2014 to 2016, he held the position of Head of Cabinet of the Minister of Economic Development. Following his role as Head of the Security Service upon returning to work in the Chamber of Deputies, he was once again appointed as the Head of Cabinet for both the Minister of Economic Development and the Minister of Labor and Welfare Policies in 2018.

In 2020, Vito Cozzoli assumed the position of President and chief executive officer of Sport e Salute S.p.A., an Italian public company dedicated to the development and promotion of sports and healthy lifestyles. The company is also responsible for organizing major sporting events at the Foro Italico and the Stadio Olimpico in Rome. During his tenure, he spearheaded numerous socially impactful initiatives, including the Scuola Attiva, Sport di Tutti Quartieri, Inclusione, Carceri e Parchi, and Spazi Civici - Play District projects, contributing to Italy's rise as one of the least sedentary countries in Europe by 2023, compared to the data recorded in 2019.

== Additional roles and responsibilities ==
Vito Cozzoli currently holds the following positions:

- Member of the Steering Committee of the LUISS Master of Science in law, Digital Innovation and Sustainability
- Member of the Scientific Committee of the LUISS Center for Parliamentary Studies
- Member of the Scientific Committee of LUISS @LawLab - Laboratory on Digital Law
- Member of the Technical-Scientific Committee of the University Center of Excellence for Innovation and Creativity – BaLab, University of Bari

He has also held the following positions:

- President of the “Amerigo International Cultural Exchanges Programs Alumni” Association at the Embassy of the United States of America in Rome from 2013 to 2020. This association brings together Italian participants in cultural exchange programs sponsored by the American Government
- Member of the Board of Directors of the Center for Higher American Studies
- Honorary member of the Foreign Policy Association in New York
- Ordinary Member of ISLE (Institute for Documentation and Legislative Studies)
- Member of the commission established in 2015 at the Ministry of Justice for the reform of bankruptcy procedures
- Member of the Organizing Committee of the 2022 Ryder Cup golf competition in Rome
- Member of the Strategic Committee of the Italian Professional Football League – LegaPro
- President of the Second Instance Committee for UEFA Licensing at the Italian Football Federation from 2015 to 2020

== Honours ==
Grand Officer of the Order of Merit of the Italian Republic - ribbon for ordinary uniform

Grand Officer of the Order of Merit of the Italian Republic
— 2018

Commander of the Order of Merit of the Italian Republic - ribbon for ordinary uniform

Commander of the Order of Merit of the Italian Republic
— 2012

Officer of the Order of Merit of the Italian Republic - ribbon for ordinary uniform

Officer of the Order of Merit of the Italian Republic
— 2008

Knight of the Order of Merit of the Italian Republic - ribbon for ordinary uniform

Knight of the Order of Merit of the Italian Republic
— 2005

== Awards ==
In 2017, Vito Cozzoli was honored with the Silver and then with the Bronze Star for Sports Merit by CONI (Italian National Olympic Committee), followed by the Silver Star in 2018. Additionally, he was bestowed with the Grand Cross pro Merito Melitensi of the Sovereign Order of Malta, and he holds the title of Commander of the Equestrian Order of Saint Agatha of San Marino. He was also awarded the honorary title of Officier of the Guardia di Finanza by the National Association of Customs Officers of Italy.

== Publications ==
- Vito Cozzoli (2002). I gruppi parlamentari nella transizione del sistema politico-istituzionale. Le riforme regolamentari della Camera dei Deputati nella XIII legislatura. Giuffrè. ISBN 881409733X.
- Vito Cozzoli (2004). Procedure di privatizzazione: la dismissione di Telecom Italia. Giuffrè.
- Vito Cozzoli (2017). Sviluppo e innovazione: idee esperienze e policy per la competitività del Paese. Jovene. ISBN 978-8824324519.
- Albanese, Luca; Cozzoli, Vito; Sgaravato, Ermanno (2018). Amministrazione straordinaria delle grandi imprese in crisi. Manuale operativo. Jovene. ISBN 9788824325257.
- Vito Cozzoli (2025). L'anima sociale e industriale dello sport. Piemme.

== See also ==
- Ryder Cup
