= Augusto Antonio Barbera =

Italian politician

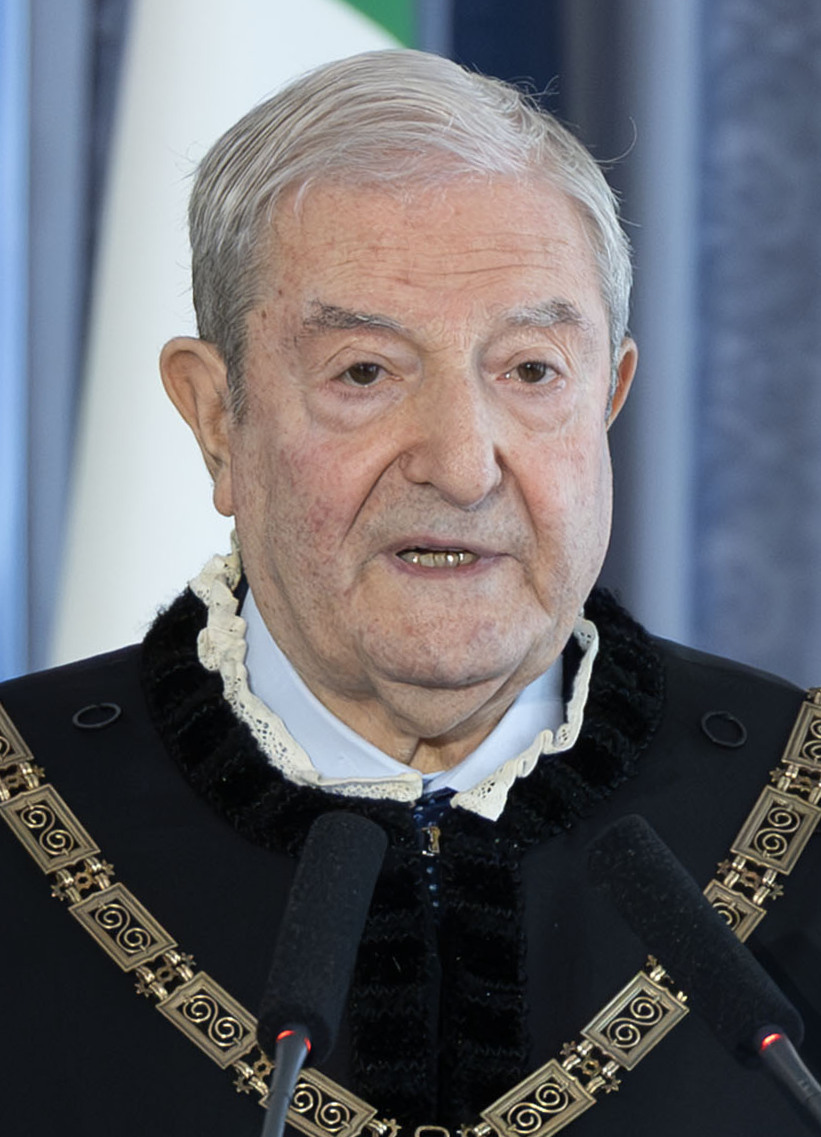

President of the Constitutional Court of Italy
- In office 12 December 2023 – 21 December 2024
- Preceded by: Silvana Sciarra
- Succeeded by: Giovanni Amoroso

Judge of the Constitutional Court of Italy
- In office 21 December 2015 – 21 December 2024
- Appointed by: Italian Parliament

Minister for Parliamentary Relations
- In office 29 April 1993 – 4 May 1993
- Prime Minister: Carlo Azeglio Ciampi
- Preceded by: Egidio Sterpa
- Succeeded by: Paolo Barile

Member of the Chamber of Deputies
- In office 30 June 1982 – 14 April 1994
- Constituency: Bologna
- In office 5 July 1976 – 19 June 1979
- Constituency: Bologna

Personal details
- Born: 25 June 1938 (age 88) Aidone, Italy
- Party: PCI (until 1991); PDS (1991-1998); DS (1998-2007); PD (2007-2015)
- Education: University of Catania
- Profession: University professor

Augusto Antonio Barbera (born 25 June 1938) is an Italian judge and former constitutional law professor at the University of Bologna. In his political career he was member of the Chamber of Deputies between 1976 and 1994 for the Italian Communist Party and later the Democratic Party of the Left. In 1993 he served shortly as Minister without portfolio for relations with Parliament in the government of Prime Minister Carlo Azeglio Ciampi. Barbera was Judge of the Constitutional Court of Italy between 21 December 2015 and 21 December 2024 and its President between 12 December 2023 and 21 December 2024.

== Career ==
Barbera was born in Aidone on 25 June 1938. He obtained a degree in Jurisprudence with a specialization in constitutional law. Between 1967 and 1969 he worked abroad as a researcher at the universities of Karlsruhe and Heidelberg.

Barbera was a lecturer of constitutional law at the University of Catania from 1969 to 1970. He then took up similar position at the University of Ferrara, where he would remain until 1977. In that latter year he started working at the Institute of Public Law of the faculty of political science of the University of Bologna. He stopped working there in 1994. He was a professor of constitutional law at the University of Bologna. He took up emeritus status in 2014.

In 2013 Barbera was named as one of 35 academics in a commission on constitutional reform under Prime Minister Enrico Letta.

Barbera is a corresponding academic of the Academy of Sciences of the Institute of Bologna in the section of law, economics, and finance.

== Political career ==
Barbera took up political office in 1976, when he was elected to the Chamber of Deputies for the Italian Communist Party. He would stay member of the Chamber until 1994. When the Communist Party dissolved in 1991, he stayed member of its successor party, the Democratic Party of the Left. From 1987 to 1992 Barbera served as president of the parliamentary committee on regional questions.

On 29 April 1993 Barbera was one of three former Communist Party politicians named in the new Ciampi Cabinet; the other two were Vincenzo Visco and Luigi Berlinguer. Barbera was made Minister without portfolio for relations with Parliament. It was the first time in 46 years that former Communist Party politicians were made part of the cabinet. Several hours after being officially named in the government, a rupture broke in the coalition over the handling of charges in Parliament against former Prime Minister Bettino Craxi. The Ministers of the Democratic Party of the Left, to which Barbera belonged, resigned. His replacement, Paolo Barile, took office on 4 May.

On 16 December 2015, the Italian Parliament elected three candidates to the Constitutional Court of Italy: Franco Modugno, Giulio Prosperetti and Barbera. The election was realized after 31 previous failed attempts. Barbera was the candidate of the Democratic Party, he obtained 581 votes in favor. He was sworn in five days after his election.

== Electoral history ==
Election	House	Constituency	Party	Votes	Result
1976	Chamber of Deputies	Bologna–Ferrara–Ravenna–Forlì	PCI	13,642	Elected
1979	Chamber of Deputies	Bologna–Ferrara–Ravenna–Forlì	PCI	10,280	Not elected
1980	Legislative Assembly of Emilia-Romagna	Bologna	PCI	4,085	Elected
1983	Chamber of Deputies	Bologna–Ferrara–Ravenna–Forlì	PCI	16,011	Elected
1987	Chamber of Deputies	Bologna–Ferrara–Ravenna–Forlì	PCI	10,817	Elected
1992	Chamber of Deputies	Bologna–Ferrara–Ravenna–Forlì	PDS	8,705	Elected

== Honour ==
- Italy: Knight Grand Cross of the Order of Merit of the Italian Republic (31 May 2017)

Political offices
Preceded by Egidio Sterpa	Minister for Parliamentary Relations; 1993	Succeeded by Paolo Barile
Legal offices
Preceded by Sergio Mattarella	Judge of the Constitutional Court of Italy; 2015–2024	Succeeded by TBE
Preceded by Silvana Sciarra	President of the Constitutional Court of Italy; 2023–2024	Succeeded by Giovanni Amoroso
