= Egidio Sterpa =

Italian journalist and politician (1926–2010)

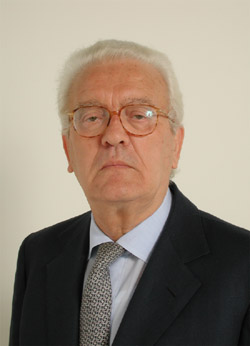

Minister for Parliamentary Relations
- In office 23 July 1989 – 28 June 1992
- Prime Minister: Giulio Andreotti
- Preceded by: Sergio Mattarella
- Succeeded by: Augusto Barbera

Member of the Chamber of Deputies
- In office 20 June 1979 – 14 April 1994
- In office 30 May 2001 – 27 April 2006

Member of the Senate of the Republic
- In office 27 April 2006 – 28 April 2008

Personal details
- Born: 22 September 1926 Vejano, Kingdom of Italy
- Died: 1 July 2010 (aged 83) Milan, Italy
- Party: PLI (till 1994); FI (1994–2009)
- Occupation: Journalist; politician

Egidio Sterpa (22 September 1926 – 1 July 2010) was an Italian journalist and politician.

== Biography ==
=== Journalistic career ===
In 1948, Sterpa founded, along with Pino Rauti and Enzo Erra, La Sfida (The Challenge), the political-cultural magazine of the youth of the Italian Social Movement. The magazine came out on newsstands from 1948 to 1950. In June 1951, Sterpa was arrested and accused of fascist apology; he was released the following month.

He began his professional career in journalism as reporter for Il Tempo, and in 1951, at the age of 25, became editor-in-chief. He later began editor-in-chief for Il Giornale d'Italia until 1958, when he started working for Corriere della Sera. He left the Corriere in 1972, when it began supporting the entry of the Italian Communist Party in the Italian government.

In 1974, he joined Indro Montanelli in the creation of Il Giornale and wrote articles in Montanelli's newspaper since the first issue, until April 2008. From May 2008 to August 2009, Sterpa worked for Libero.

=== Political career ===
He has been elected to the Chamber of Deputies with the Italian Liberal Party from 1979 to 1994. He was a member of the right-wing of the party and became Renato Altissimo's Deputy Secretary. From 1989 to 1992, he has been appointed Minister for Parliamentary Relations in the last two cabinets led by Giulio Andreotti.

In 1994, Sterpa is one of the first to join Silvio Berlusconi's Forza Italia, with which he is elected once again Deputy in 2001 and Senator in 2006.

Sterpa has died in Milan on 1 July 2010, at the age of 83.
