= Giulio Prosperetti =

Italian judge

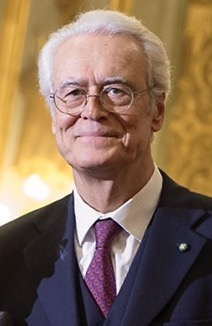

Judge of the Constitutional Court of Italy
- In office 21 December 2015 – 21 December 2024
- Appointed by: Italian Parliament

Personal details
- Born: 7 December 1946 (age 79) Perugia, Italy

Giulio Prosperetti (born 7 December 1946) is an Italian judge and labour law professor at the University of Rome Tor Vergata. He has been Judge of the Constitutional Court of Italy since 21 December 2015.

== Career ==
Prosperetti was born in Perugia on 7 December 1946. In 1971 he obtained a degree in Jurisprudence under Giuseppe Guarino. He worked as a professor of labour law between 1985 and 1994 at the University of Cassino and Southern Lazio. Since 1994 he has been a professor of labour law at the University of Rome Tor Vergata. Prosperetti has been a judge at the Court of Appeal of Vatican City for more than twenty years.

On 16 December 2015, the Italian Parliament elected three candidates to the Constitutional Court of Italy: Augusto Barbera, Franco Modugno and Prosperetti. The election was realized after 31 previous failed attempts. Properetti was the candidate of centrist politicians, he obtained 585 votes in favor. He was sworn in five days after his election.

Prosperetti was made a Grand Officer in the Order of Merit of the Italian Republic on 27 December 1997.
