= Sergio Mattarella =

President of Italy since 2015

Sergio Mattarella OMRI OMCA
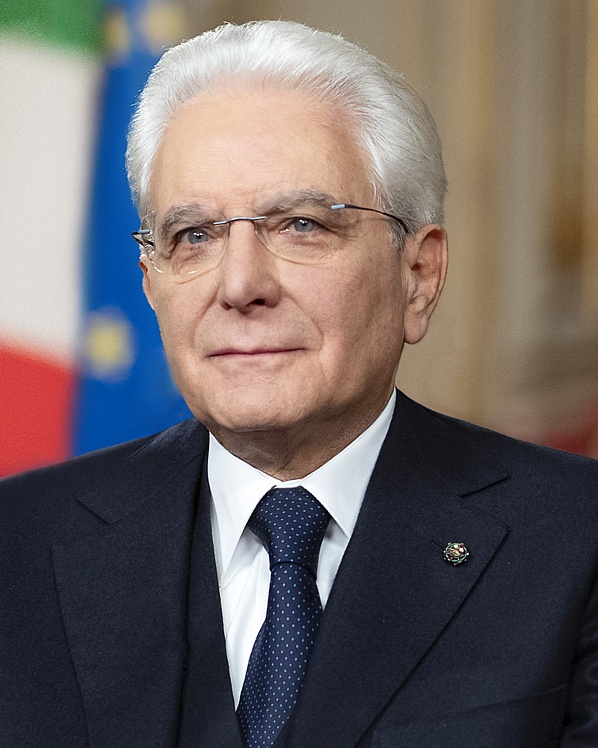
- Official portrait, 2022

President of Italy
- Incumbent
- Assumed office 3 February 2015
- Prime Minister: Matteo Renzi; Paolo Gentiloni; Giuseppe Conte; Mario Draghi; Giorgia Meloni
- Preceded by: Giorgio Napolitano

Judge of the Constitutional Court of Italy
- In office 11 October 2011 – 2 February 2015
- Appointed by: Italian Parliament
- Preceded by: Ugo De Siervo
- Succeeded by: Augusto Antonio Barbera

Minister of Defence
- In office 22 December 1999 – 11 June 2001
- Prime Minister: Massimo D'Alema; Giuliano Amato
- Preceded by: Carlo Scognamiglio
- Succeeded by: Antonio Martino

Deputy Prime Minister of Italy
- In office 21 October 1998 – 22 December 1999
- Prime Minister: Massimo D'Alema
- Preceded by: Walter Veltroni
- Succeeded by: Gianfranco Fini

Minister of Public Education
- In office 23 July 1989 – 27 July 1990
- Prime Minister: Giulio Andreotti
- Preceded by: Giovanni Galloni
- Succeeded by: Gerardo Bianco

Minister for Parliamentary Relations
- In office 29 July 1987 – 23 July 1989
- Prime Minister: Giovanni Goria; Ciriaco De Mita
- Preceded by: Gaetano Gifuni
- Succeeded by: Egidio Sterpa

Member of the Chamber of Deputies
- In office 12 July 1983 – 28 April 2008
- Constituency: See list: Palermo (1983–1994) Sicily 1 (1994–2001; 2006–2008) Trentino-Alto Adige (2001–2006)

Personal details
- Born: 23 July 1941 (age 85) Palermo, Sicily, Kingdom of Italy
- Party: Independent (since 2009)
- Other political affiliations: DC (before 1994); PPI (1994–2002); DL (2002–2007); PD (2007–2009)
- Spouse: Marisa Chiazzese (m. 1966; died 2012)
- Children: 3, including Laura
- Parents: Bernardo Mattarella (father); Maria Buccellato (mother)
- Relatives: Piersanti Mattarella (brother)
- Education: Sapienza University of Rome

Sergio Mattarella (Note: Italian pronunciation: [ˈsɛrdʒo mattaˈrɛlla].) (born 23 July 1941) is an Italian politician who has been serving as the president of Italy since 2015. He is the longest-serving president in the history of the Italian Republic. Since Giorgio Napolitano died in 2023, Mattarella is the only living Italian president.

A Catholic leftist politician, Mattarella was a leading member of the Christian Democracy (DC) party from the early 1980s until its dissolution. He served as Minister for Parliamentary Relations from 1987 to 1989, and Minister of Education from 1989 to 1990. In 1994, Mattarella was among the founders of the Italian People's Party (PPI), serving as the Deputy Prime Minister of Italy from 1998 to 1999, and Minister of Defence from 1999 to 2001. He joined The Daisy (DL) in 2002 and was one of the founders of the Democratic Party (PD) in 2007, leaving it when he retired from politics in 2008. He also served as a judge of the Constitutional Court of Italy from 2011 to 2015.

On 31 January 2015, Mattarella was elected to the presidency on the fourth ballot, supported by the centre-left coalition majority led by the PD and centrist parties. Despite having initially ruled out a second term, he was re-elected on 29 January 2022, becoming the second Italian president to be re-elected, the first being Napolitano. As of 2025, five prime ministers have served under his presidency: Matteo Renzi, at that time the PD leader and the main sponsor of Mattarella's presidential candidacy; Paolo Gentiloni, a leading member of the PD who succeeded Renzi after his resignation in 2016; Giuseppe Conte, at that time an independent politician who governed both with right-wing and left-wing coalitions in two consecutive cabinets; Mario Draghi, a banker and former president of the European Central Bank who was appointed by Mattarella to lead a national unity government following Conte's resignation; and Giorgia Meloni, Italy's first ever female prime minister and the most right-wing since 1945 as leader of the coalition that won the general election in September 2022.

During his tenure, Italy faced the aftermath of the Great Recession and the severe 2015 European migrant crisis, both of which deeply marked Italian political, economic, and social life, bringing about the rise of populist parties. Moreover, Italy became one of the countries worst affected by the COVID-19 pandemic in 2020, being the first country in the Western world to implement a national lockdown to stop the spread of the disease. During his second term, he faced growing geopolitical tensions in Europe between NATO and Russia, consistently reaffirming his staunch pro-Europeanist positions. Like his predecessor Napolitano, Mattarella has been accused of wielding the largely ceremonial role of head of state in an executive manner; his successful opposition to the appointment of Paolo Savona as Minister of Economy and Finance led to a constitutional crisis and threats of impeachment, and he twice intervened in government formations by appointing his own candidates for prime minister (Gentiloni in 2016 and Draghi in 2021) in lieu of calling new elections. He has been praised for his political mediation skills and impartiality, and his presidency and personal popularity have consistently garnered high approval ratings.

== Early life ==
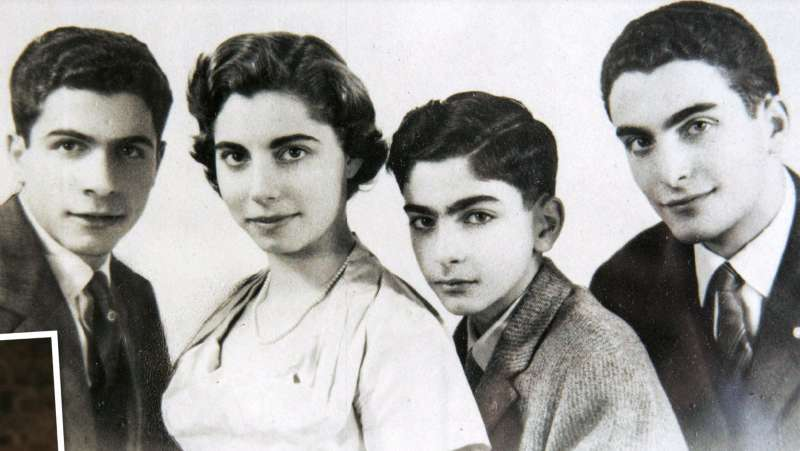
Sergio Mattarella (third from the left) and his siblings in the early 1950s; to the right is his brother Piersanti

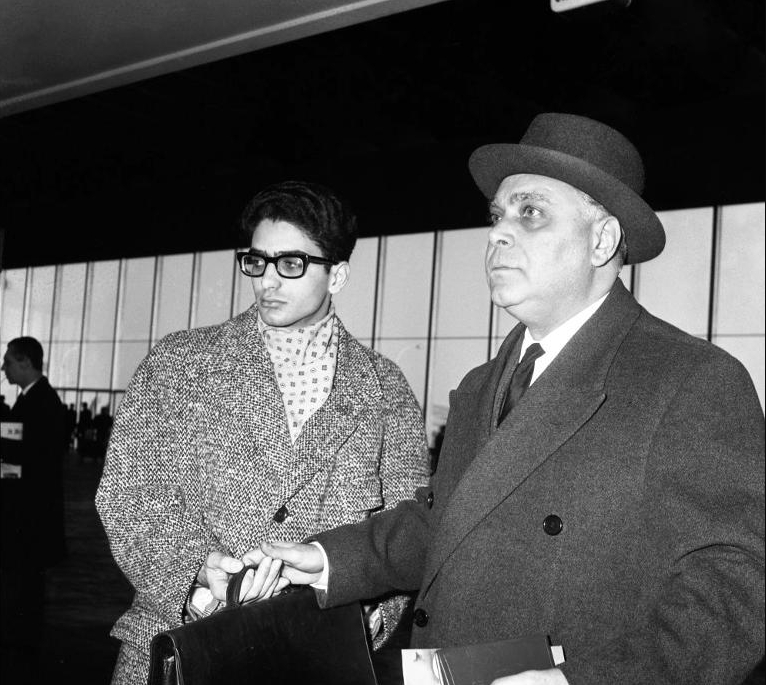
Mattarella with his father Bernardo in 1963

Mattarella was born in Palermo on 23 July 1941 into a prominent Sicilian family. His father Bernardo Mattarella was an anti-fascist who, alongside Alcide De Gasperi and other Catholic politicians, founded Christian Democracy (DC), which dominated the Italian political scene for almost fifty years, with Bernardo serving as a minister several times. Bernardo Mattarella has also been accused of being associated with the Sicilian Mafia; however, accusations were always rejected in court. His mother Maria Buccellato came from an upper-middle-class family of Trapani.

During his youth, Mattarella moved to Rome due to his father's commitments to politics. In Rome, he became a member of Azione Cattolica (AC), a large Catholic lay association, of which he became the regional chairman for Lazio from 1961 to 1964. After attending Istituto San Leone Magno, a classical lyceum (liceo classico) in Rome, he studied law at the Sapienza University of Rome, where he joined the Italian Catholic Federation of University Students (FUCI).

In 1964, Mattarella graduated with merit with the thesis The Function of Political Direction. In 1967, he became a lawyer in Palermo, becoming particularly involved in administrative law. After a few years, Mattarella started teaching parliamentary procedure at the University of Palermo, where he remained until 1983. His academic activity and publications during this period mainly concerned constitutional law topics, the intervention of Sicilian government in economy, bicameralism, legislative procedure, expropriation allowance, evolution of the Sicilian regional administration, and controls on local authorities.

In 1966, Mattarella married Marisa Chiazzese, daughter of Lauro Chiazzese, former rector of the University of Palermo, with whom he had three children: Laura, Francesco, and Bernardo. On 6 January 1980, his older brother Piersanti Mattarella, who was also a DC politician and president of Sicily since 1978, was killed by the Sicilian Mafia in Palermo. This event deeply changed Mattarella's life, and he left his academic career to enter politics.

== Political career ==
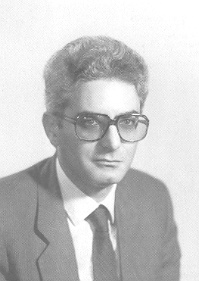
Mattarella's first portrait as a deputy in 1983

One of the first important positions that Mattarella held was the head of the board of arbitrators of the DC, quickly reconstituted at the end of 1981 following the Propaganda Due scandal and the establishment of the related parliamentary commission of inquiry, chaired by Tina Anselmi. The internal body of the party had been charged with identifying the militants registered in the Masonic lodge of Licio Gelli to expel or suspend them, having violated the statute of the party that prohibited registration to Masonic lodges. Mattarella's parliamentary career began in 1983, when he was elected member of the Chamber of Deputies with nearly 120,000 votes in the constituency of Palermo. As a deputy, Mattarella joined the left-leaning faction of the DC known as morotei. The faction, close to Aldo Moro, supported an agreement with the Italian Communist Party (PCI) led by Enrico Berlinguer, the Historic Compromise; his brother Piersanti Mattarella also supported it.

In 1982, Cosa Nostra killed the PCI regional secretary Pio La Torre and the prefect of Palermo Carlo Alberto dalla Chiesa. These tragic events shook the credibility of the regional political system dominated by DC. In the following year, Mattarella was entrusted by Ciriaco De Mita, the DC secretary, to "clean up" the Sicilian branch of the party from Mafia control, at a time when mafia made men like Salvo Lima and Vito Ciancimino were powerful political figures in the region. In 1985, he helped the young lawyer Leoluca Orlando, who had worked alongside his brother Piersanti during his governorship of Sicily, to become the new mayor of Palermo; the two men set out to break the Mafia's hold on the island, transferring budget authority from the corrupt regional government back to the cities and passing a law enforcing the same building standards used in the rest of Italy, thereby making the Mafia's building schemes illegal. In 1987, Mattarella was re-elected to the Chamber of Deputies with more than 143,000 votes, remaining close to the left-leaning faction of the party as well as to its secretary De Mita.

=== Minister and lawmaker ===
On 29 July 1987, Mattarella was appointed Italian Minister for Parliamentary Relations in the government led by the DC prime minister Giovanni Goria. The government lasted until April 1988, when De Mita was sworn in as new prime minister; however, Mattarella was confirmed as minister. In March 1989, a maxi-competition for professorships was held for the secondary school. Mattarella reorganized also the teaching programs of two-year high schools, completing the first steps of the "Brocca project", the educational system's revision program, undertaken under his predecessor Giovanni Galloni in 1988. Mattarella also oversaw the overall reform of the elementary school, which made the three teachers' module on two classes universal on 23 May 1990, leading to the overcoming of the traditional single teacher.

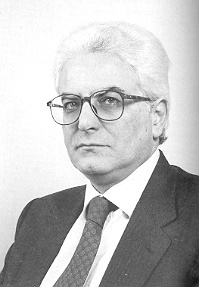
Mattarella in 1994

On 23 July 1989, Mattarella became Italian Minister of Education in the sixth cabinet of Giulio Andreotti. In January 1990, Mattarella led the first National School Conference, which discussed the renewal of the educational system and addressed the issue of school autonomy. At the end of June 1990, the "anti-drug law" was approved, which mandated health education to schools; the combination of the education system and preventive measures, not only in health matters, was part of the programmatic lines that the minister had drawn. On 27 July 1990, Mattarella resigned from his position, together with other ministers, upon the Italian Parliament's passing in 1990 of the Mammì Act, liberalising the media in Italy, which they saw as a favour to the media magnate Berlusconi.

In 1990, Mattarella was elected deputy secretary of the DC. He left the post two years later to become director of Il Popolo, the official newspaper of the party. Following the 1993 Italian referendum, he drafted the new electoral law nicknamed Mattarellum. The electoral law consisted in a parallel voting system, which act as a mixed system, with 75% of seats allocated using a first-past-the-post electoral system and 25% using proportional representation, with one round of voting.

During those years in the early 1990s, the whole Italian political system was shocked by the Tangentopoli corruption scandal; Mattarella was not directly involved in the scandal. In August 1993, he was among the recipients of an investigation's notification that followed the statements of a Sicilian real estate entrepreneur, who accused him. Mattarella resigned from all his posts and was thanked by Mino Martinazzoli, the then DC leader, who expressed his support to him. Martinazzoli's statement was publicly criticized by Francesco Cossiga because it was in contrast with what was done for other politicians involved in the scandal. Mattarella was later acquitted of the charge.

=== Minister within the centre-left coalitions ===
Mattarella was one of the protagonists of the renewal of the DC after Tangentopoli that would lead in January 1994 to the foundation of the Italian People's Party (PPI). In the ensuing 1994 Italian general election, in which the newly founded PPI fared poorly, Mattarella was again elected to the Chamber of Deputies. He soon found himself engaged in an internal dispute after the election of new party leader Rocco Buttiglione, who wished to steer the PPI towards an electoral alliance with Silvio Berlusconi's Forza Italia (FI). Following Buttiglione's appointment, Mattarella resigned as director of Il Popolo in opposition to this policy. In a 20 July 1994 interview with l'Unità, Mattarella considered the new political proposal that was taking shape for a new centre-left coalition interesting, "especially for those who are very nostalgic for Aldo Moro's political strategy." In 1995, at the height of the internal conflict within the PPI, he addressed Buttiglione, who was stubbornly seeking an alliance with the political right, as "el general coup leader Roquito Butillone" and defined "an irrational nightmare" the hypothesis that Berlusconi's FI could be accepted into the European People's Party.

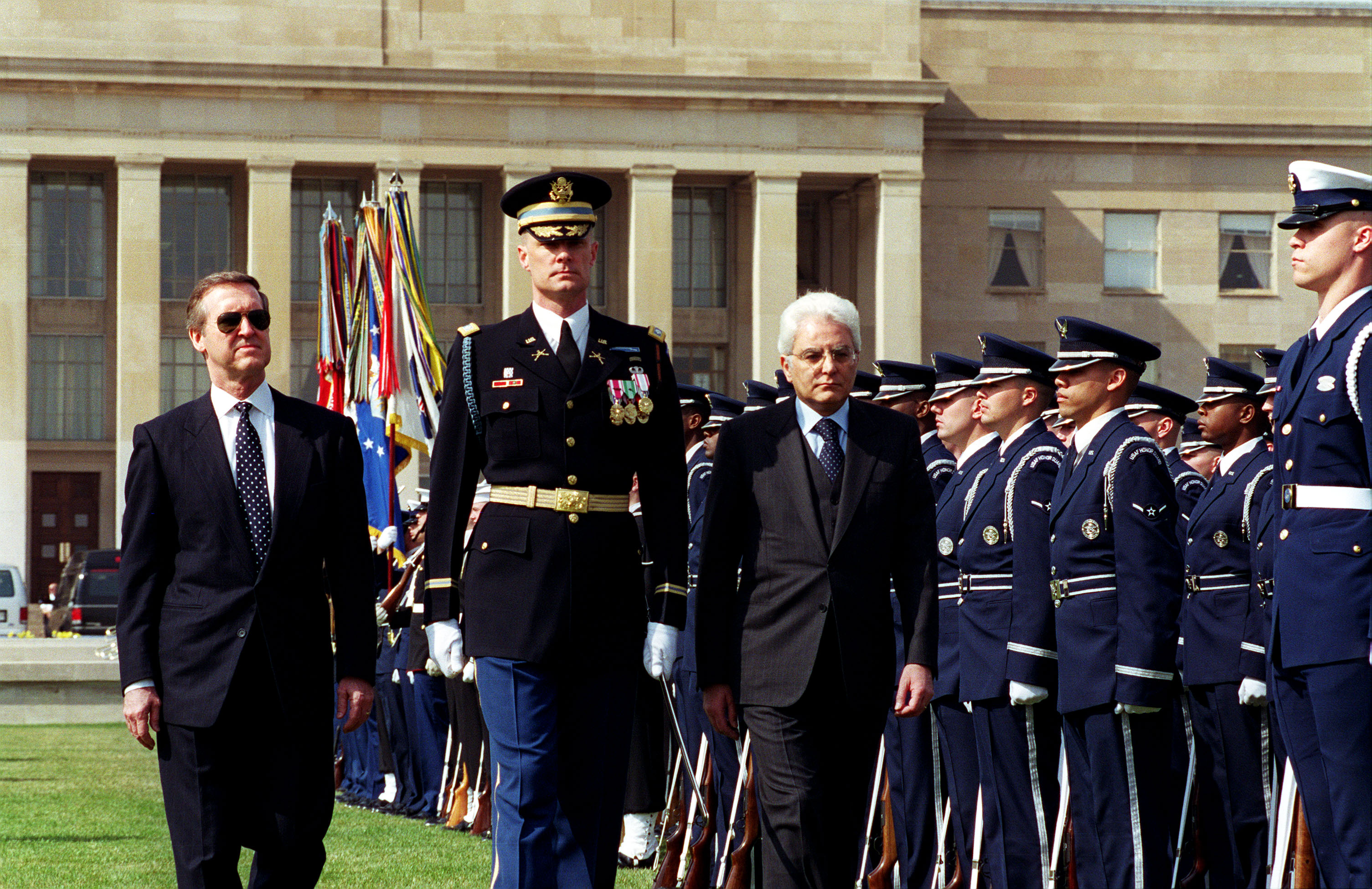
Mattarella with the U.S. Secretary of Defense William Cohen in March 2000

Mattarella was one of the first supporters of the economist Romano Prodi at the head of the centre-left coalition known as The Olive Tree in the 1996 Italian general election. After the electoral victory of the centre-left, Mattarella served as leader of the PPI's parliamentary group. Two years later, when the first Prodi government fell, Mattarella was appointed by Massimo D'Alema as Deputy Prime Minister of Italy with responsibility for the secret services, which he tried to reform. The reform of the secret services proposed by Mattarella collected the indications provided by the Jucci Commission, which had worked extensively on the subject, and aimed at strengthening the political control of the services by the prime minister of Italy, in coordination with the Digis (Government Department of Security Information), by removing power from the Interior Ministry and Defense. It was the basis for the 2007 reform of the secret services.

In December 1999, Mattarella was appointed Italian Minister of Defence in the second D'Alema government. As Minister of Defence, he supported the NATO bombing of Yugoslavia against the Serbian president Slobodan Milošević; he also approved a reform of the Italian Armed Forces which abolished conscription. After the resignation of D'Alema in 2000, Mattarella kept his position as Minister of Defence in the second Amato government. In October 2000, the PPI joined with other centrist parties to form an alliance called The Daisy (DL), later to merge into a single party in March 2002. Mattarella was re-elected to the Italian Parliament in the 2001 and 2006 general elections, standing as a candidate for The Daisy in two successive centre-left coalitions: The Olive Tree and The Union (L'Unione). In 2007, Mattarella was one of the founders of the Democratic Party (PD), a big tent centre-left party formed from a merger of left-wing and centrist parties that had been part of The Olive Tree, including The Daisy and the Democrats of the Left (heirs of the PCI).

=== Judge of the Constitutional Court ===
On 5 October 2011, Mattarella was elected by the Italian Parliament, as is custom, with 572 votes to be a judge of the Constitutional Court of Italy. He was sworn in on 11 October 2011 and served until he was sworn in as President of the Italian Republic in February 2015. As a constitutional judge, Mattarella was the rapporteur of thirty-nine sentences issued by the Court and was one of the judges who, on 4 December 2014, declared the Italian electoral law of 2005 unconstitutional due to an excessive majority bonus. He also signed the ruling of the Constitutional Court which concluded that the laws approved by the Sicilian Regional Assembly must now directly enter into force in Sicily, without the prior legitimacy control of the State Commissioner.

== Presidency (2015–present) ==
=== First term (2015–2022) ===
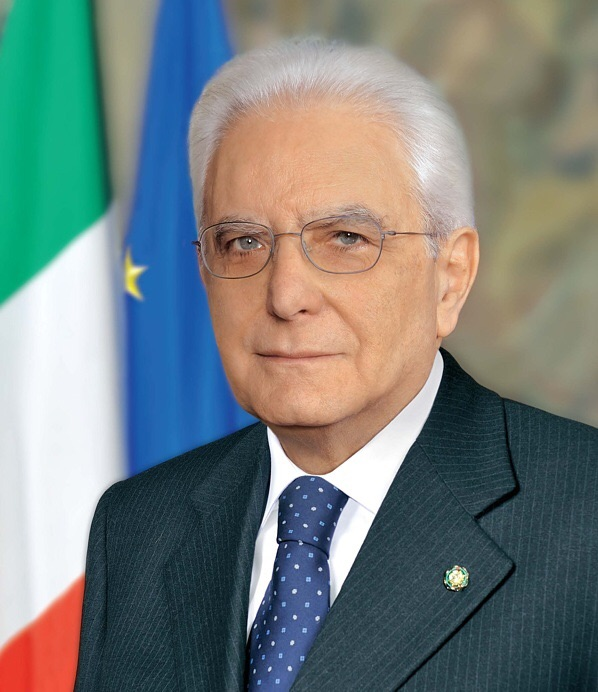
First term's official portrait

On 31 January 2015, Mattarella was elected the president of Italy at the fourth ballot with 665 votes out of 1,009, with support from the Democratic Party (PD), New Centre-Right, Civic Choice, Union of the Centre, and Left Ecology Freedom. Mattarella was officially endorsed by the PD after his name was put forward by Matteo Renzi, the prime minister of Italy at the time. He replaced Giorgio Napolitano, who had served for 8 years and 244 days, the longest presidency in the history of the Italian Republic; since Napolitano had resigned on 14 January, Senate president Pietro Grasso was the Acting President at the time of Mattarella's inauguration on 3 February. Mattarella's first statement as new president was thusly: "My thoughts go first and especially to the difficulties and hopes of our fellow citizens."

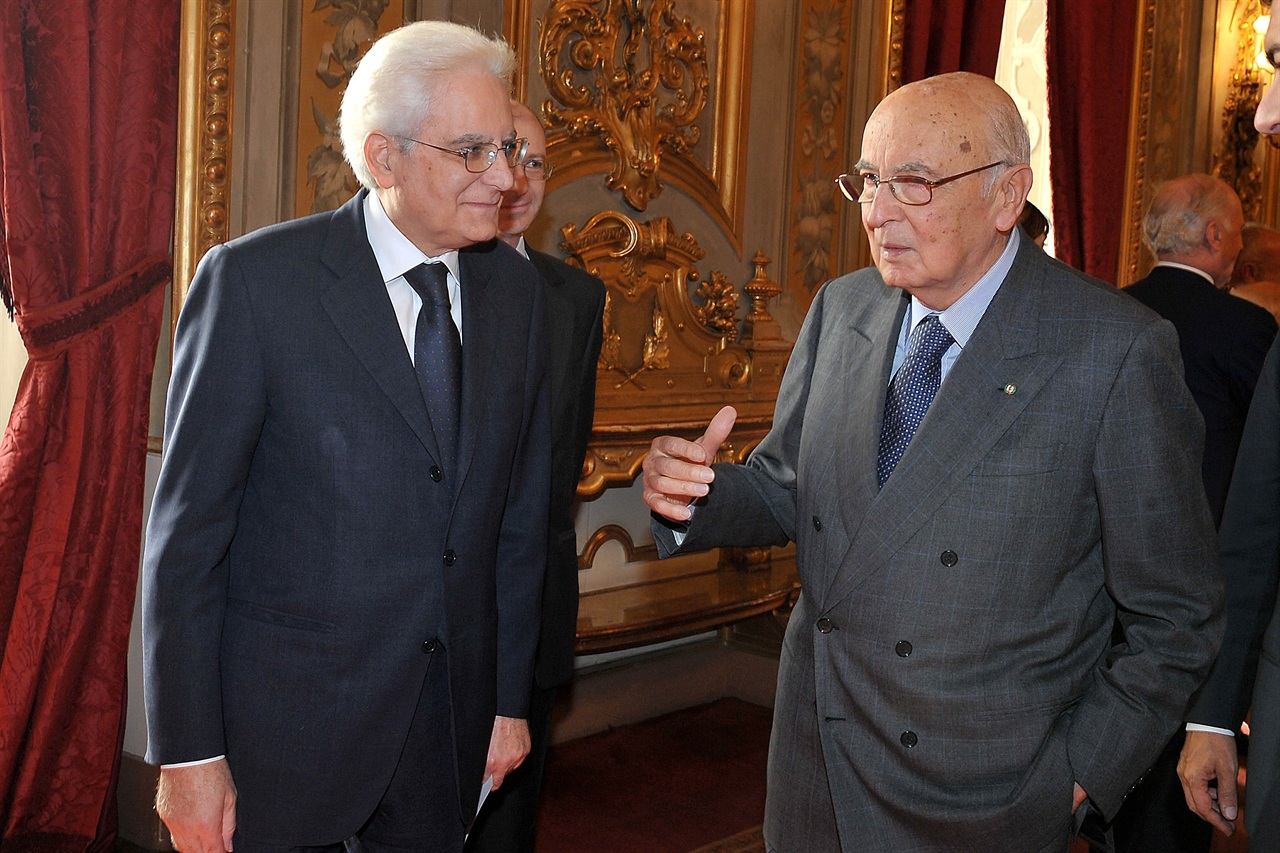
Mattarella with his predecessor Giorgio Napolitano

Mattarella's first presidential visit was on the day of his election, when he visited the Fosse Ardeatine, where during World War II in 1944 the German Nazi occupation troops killed 335 people as a reprisal for an Italian resistance movement attack. Mattarella stated that "Europe and the world must be united to defeat whoever wants to drag us into a new age of terror".

==== Appointments ====
On 13 February, Mattarella appointed Giovanni Grasso as his special counselor for press and communication. On 16 February, he appointed Ugo Zampetti as Secretary-General to the Presidency of the Republic, the head of the presidential secretariat. As of 2026, Grasso, a journalist and writer, and Zampetti, a civil servant with a long-time experience within Italian politics, are still holding their posts.

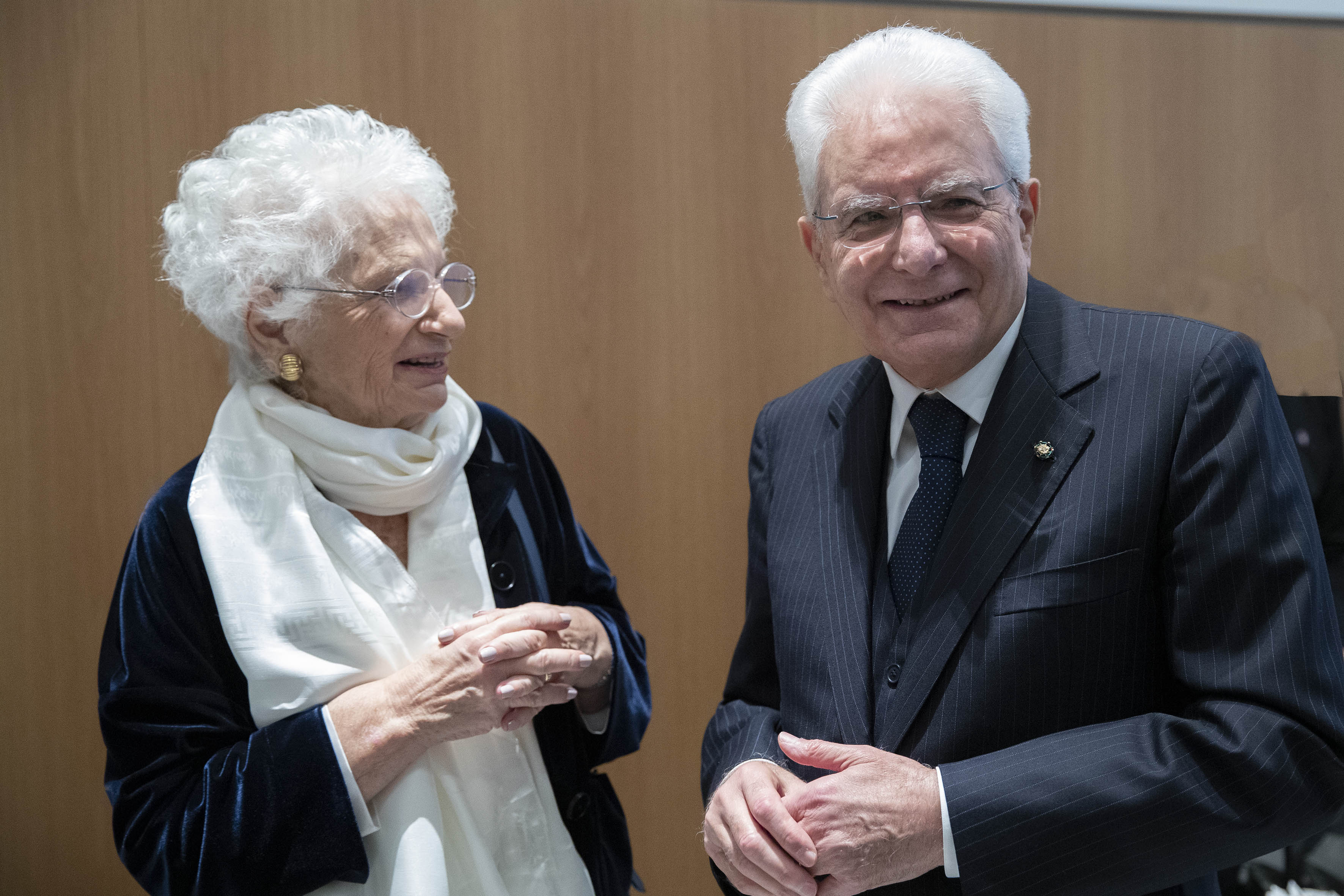
President Mattarella with Senator Liliana Segre in 2019

One of the most notable appointments of his first term was that of Liliana Segre, a Holocaust survivor and prominent witness of the Shoah, whom Mattarella appointed senator for life in 2018 for her outstanding merits in the social field and for her contribution to keeping the memory of the Holocaust alive. The appointment was widely regarded as a symbolic act reinforcing the constitutional values of antifascism and historical memory.

Mattarella also appointed several judges of the Constitutional Court, as provided by Article 135 of the Italian Constitution, which grants the President the power to appoint five of the fifteen constitutional judges. Among those appointed during his mandate were distinguished jurists and legal scholars, including Francesco Viganò in February 2018, Emanuela Navarretta and Marco D'Alberti in September 2020, Giovanni Pitruzzella in November 2023 and Antonella Sciarrone Alibrandi in November 2023. Overall, Mattarella's appointments were generally characterized by an emphasis on legal expertise, moral authority, and adherence to the values of the Italian Constitution, reinforcing the President’s role as a guarantor of institutional continuity and democratic balance.

==== 2016 political crisis ====
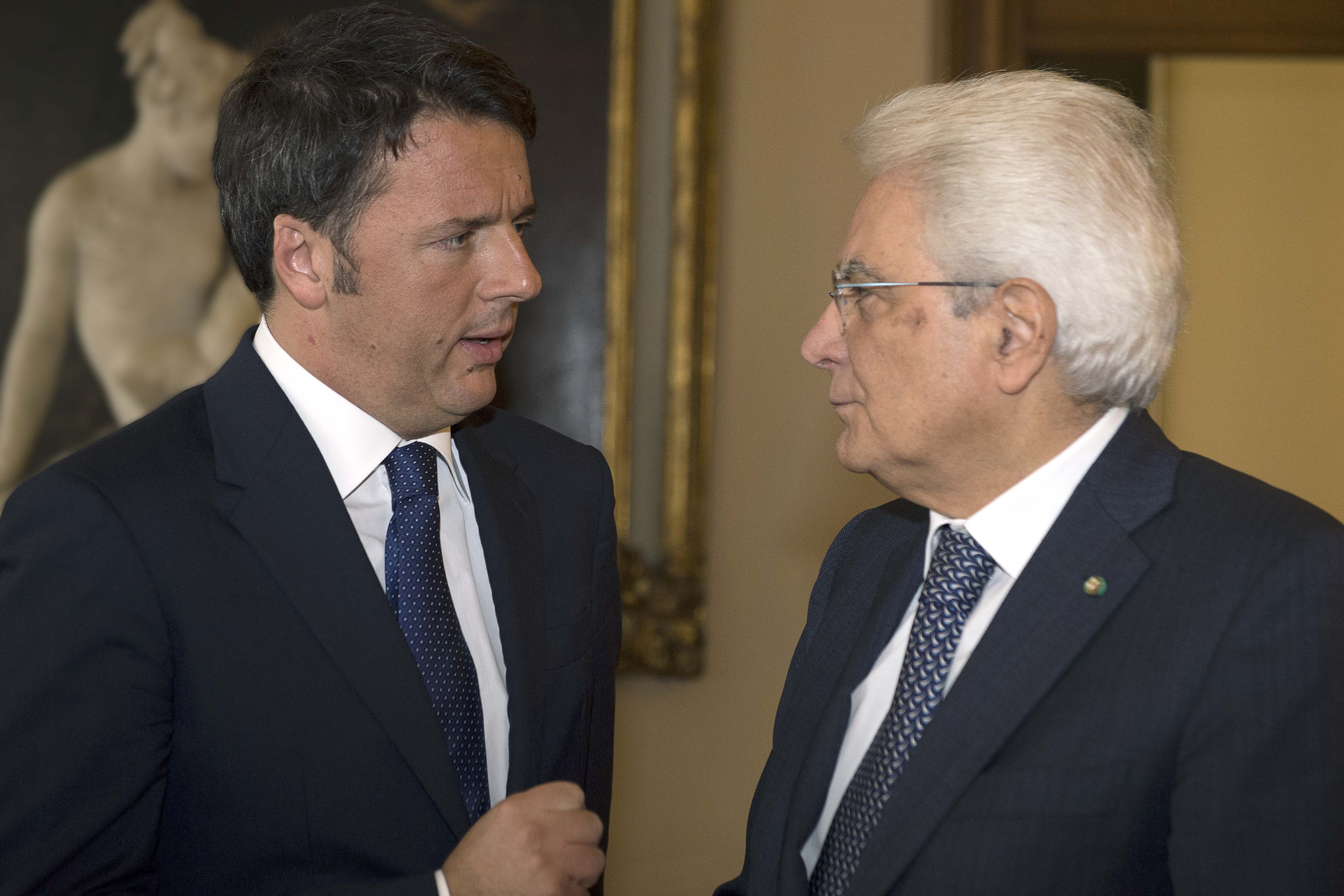
President Mattarella and Prime Minister Matteo Renzi in 2015

On 4 December 2016, a constitutional referendum was held in Italy. Voters were asked whether they approve a constitutional law that amends the Constitution of Italy to reform the composition and powers of the Parliament of Italy, as well as the division of powers between the state, the regions, and administrative entities. The bill, put forward by then-Prime Minister Matteo Renzi, and his centre-left Democratic Party, was first introduced by the government in the Senate on 8 April 2014. After several amendments were made to the proposed law by both the Senate and the Chamber of Deputies, the bill received its first approval on 13 October 2015 (Senate) and 11 January 2016 (Chamber of Deputies), and its second and final approval on 20 January (Senate) and 12 April (Chamber of Deputies).

In accordance with Article 138 of the Constitution of Italy, a referendum was called after the formal request of more than one-fifth of the members of both the Senate and the Chamber of Deputies, since the constitutional law had not been approved by a qualified majority of two-thirds in each house of parliament in the second vote. 59.11% of voters voted against the constitutional reform, meaning it did not come into effect. This was the third constitutional referendum in the history of the Italian Republic; the other two were in 2001, in which the amending law was approved, and in 2006, in which it was rejected.

Following the defeat, Prime Minister Renzi resigned. On 11 December, Mattarella appointed the incumbent Minister of Foreign Affairs Paolo Gentiloni as new head of the government. Gentiloni led a government composed by PD, NCD, and other minor centrist parties, the same majority of Renzi's. According to many political analysts and commentators, the appointment of Gentiloni caused tensions between Mattarella and Renzi, who asked the president to dissolve the parliament and call for a snap election in 2017. This version was later confirmed by Renzi during a press conference following the 2018 general election, in which he stated it was an error not to vote in 2017.

==== 2018 general election and government formation ====
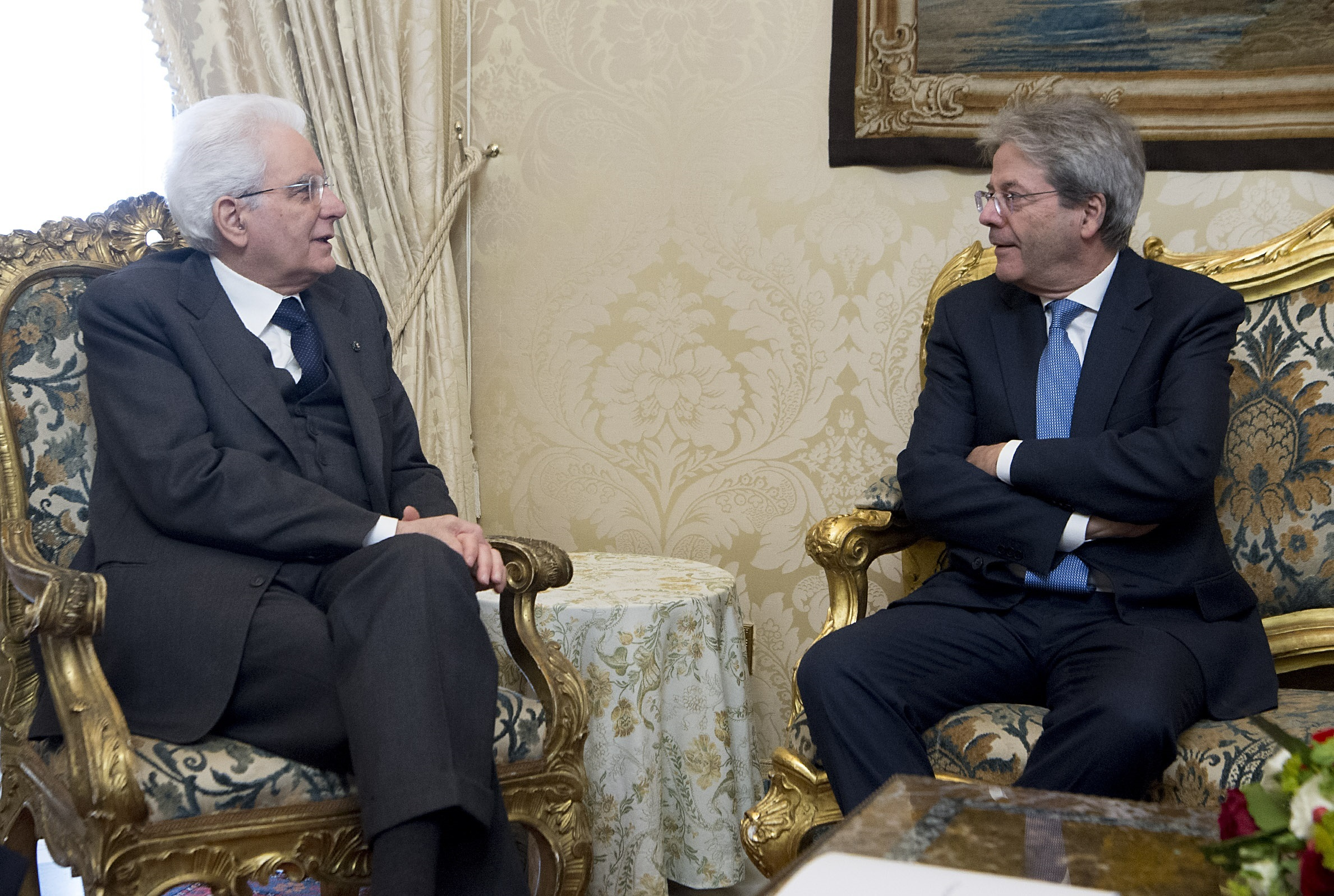
Mattarella with Prime Minister Paolo Gentiloni on 24 March 2018

The March 2018 election resulted in a hung parliament, with no coalitions able to form a majority of seats in both the Chamber of Deputies and the Senate. The election was seen as a backlash against the Establishment with the Five Star Movement (M5S) and the League becoming the two largest parties in the Parliament.

After the election's results were known, Luigi Di Maio, leader of the M5S, and Matteo Salvini, secretary of the League, each urged that Mattarella should give him the task of forming a new cabinet because he led the largest party or coalition, respectively. On 5 March, Matteo Renzi declared the PD to be in the opposition during this legislature and resigned as party leader when a new cabinet was formed. On 6 March, Salvini repeated his campaign message that his party would refuse any coalition with the M5S. On 14 March, Salvini offered to govern with the M5S, imposing the condition that League ally Forza Italia (FI), led by former prime minister Silvio Berlusconi, must also take part in any coalition. Di Maio rejected this proposal on the grounds that Salvini was "choosing restoration instead of revolution" because "Berlusconi represents the past". Moreover, Alessandro Di Battista, a prominent M5S leader, denied any possibility of an alliance with FI, describing Berlusconi as the "pure evil of our country".

The consultations between Mattarella and the major political parties in Italy on 4 and 5 April failed to result in a candidate for the prime minister, forcing Mattarella to hold another round of consultation between 11 and 12 April. On 18 April, Mattarella tasked the President of the Senate Elisabetta Casellati with trying to reconcile the issues between the centre-right coalition and the M5S in order to break the post-election political deadlock and form a fully functional new government; however, she failed to find a solution to the conflicts between the two groups, especially between FI and the M5S. On 23 April, after Casellati's failure, Mattarella gave an exploratory mandate to the President of the Chamber of Deputies Roberto Fico to try to create a political agreement between the Democratic Party (PD) and the M5S. On 30 April, following an interview of Renzi, the PD's former leader, in which he expressed his strong opposition to an alliance with the M5S, Di Maio called for new elections.

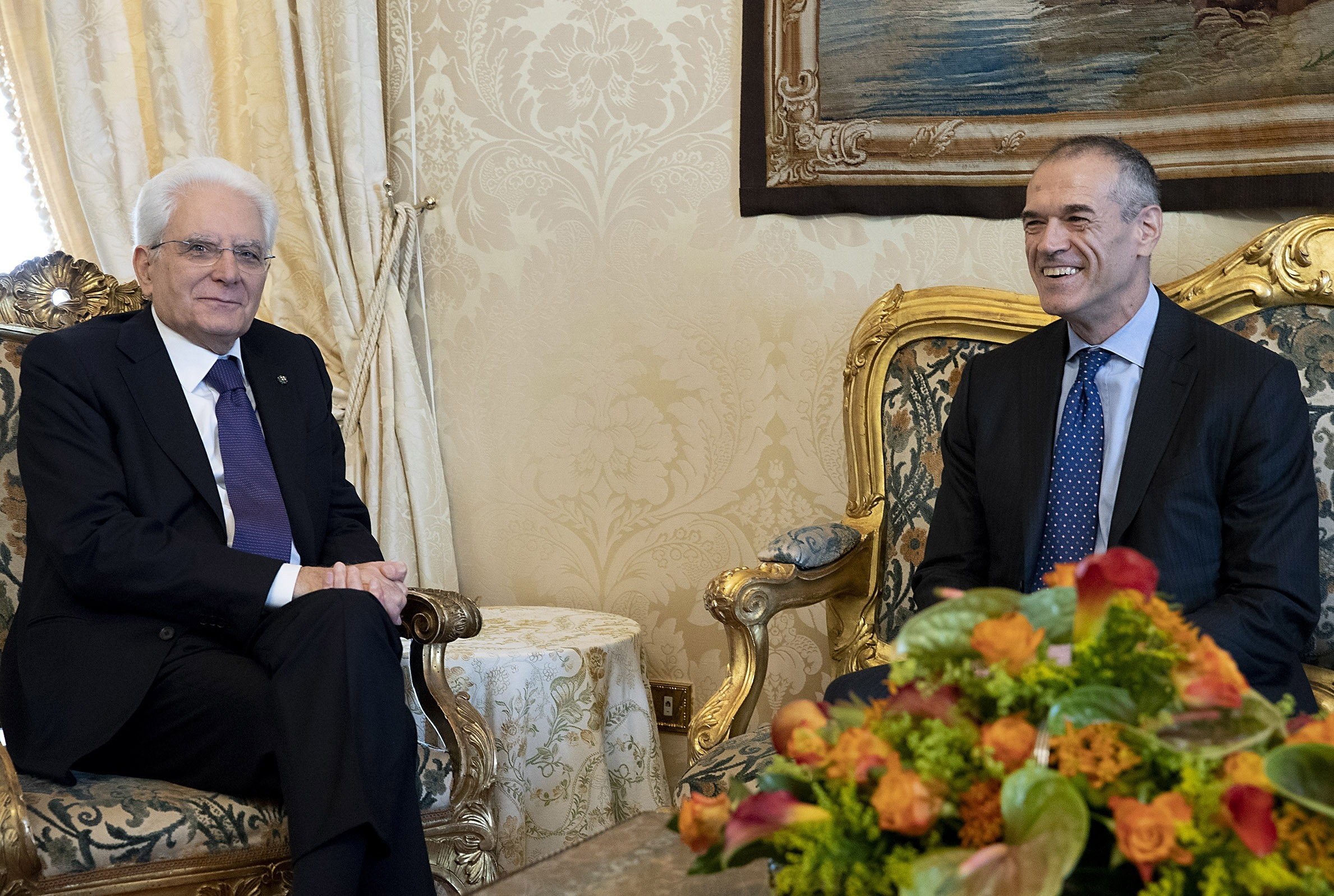
President Mattarella receiving Carlo Cottarelli in May 2018

On 7 May, Mattarella held a third round of government formation talks, after which he formally confirmed the lack of any possible majority (the M5S rejecting an alliance with the centre-right coalition, the PD rejecting an alliance with both M5S and the centre-right coalition, and the League's Salvini refusing to form a government with M5S unless it included Berlusconi's FI, whose presence in the government was explicitly vetoed by the M5S's leader Di Maio); as a result, he stated his intention to soon appoint a "neutral government" (ignoring the M5S and the League's refusal to support such an option) to take over from the Gentiloni government, which was considered unable to lead Italy into a second consecutive election, as it represented a majority from a past legislature, and suggested an early election in July, which would be the first summer general election in Italy, as an option in light of the ongoing deadlock. The League and the M5S agreed to hold new elections on 8 July, an option that was rejected by all other parties.

On 9 May, after a day of rumours, the M5S and the League officially asked Mattarella to give them 24 more hours to strike a coalition agreement between the two parties. Later that same day, Berlusconi stated that FI would not support an M5S–League government on a vote of confidence but would maintain the centre-right alliance, opening the door to a possible majority government between the two parties. On 13 May, the M5S and League reached an agreement in principle on a government program, clearing the way for the formation of a governing coalition between the two parties, but could not agree regarding the members of a government cabinet, most importantly the prime minister. The M5S and League leaders met with Mattarella on 14 May to guide the formation of a new government. At their meeting with Mattarella, both parties asked for an additional week of negotiations to agree on a detailed government program, as well as a prime minister to lead the joint government. Both the M5S and the League asked their respective members to vote on the government agreement by the weekend.

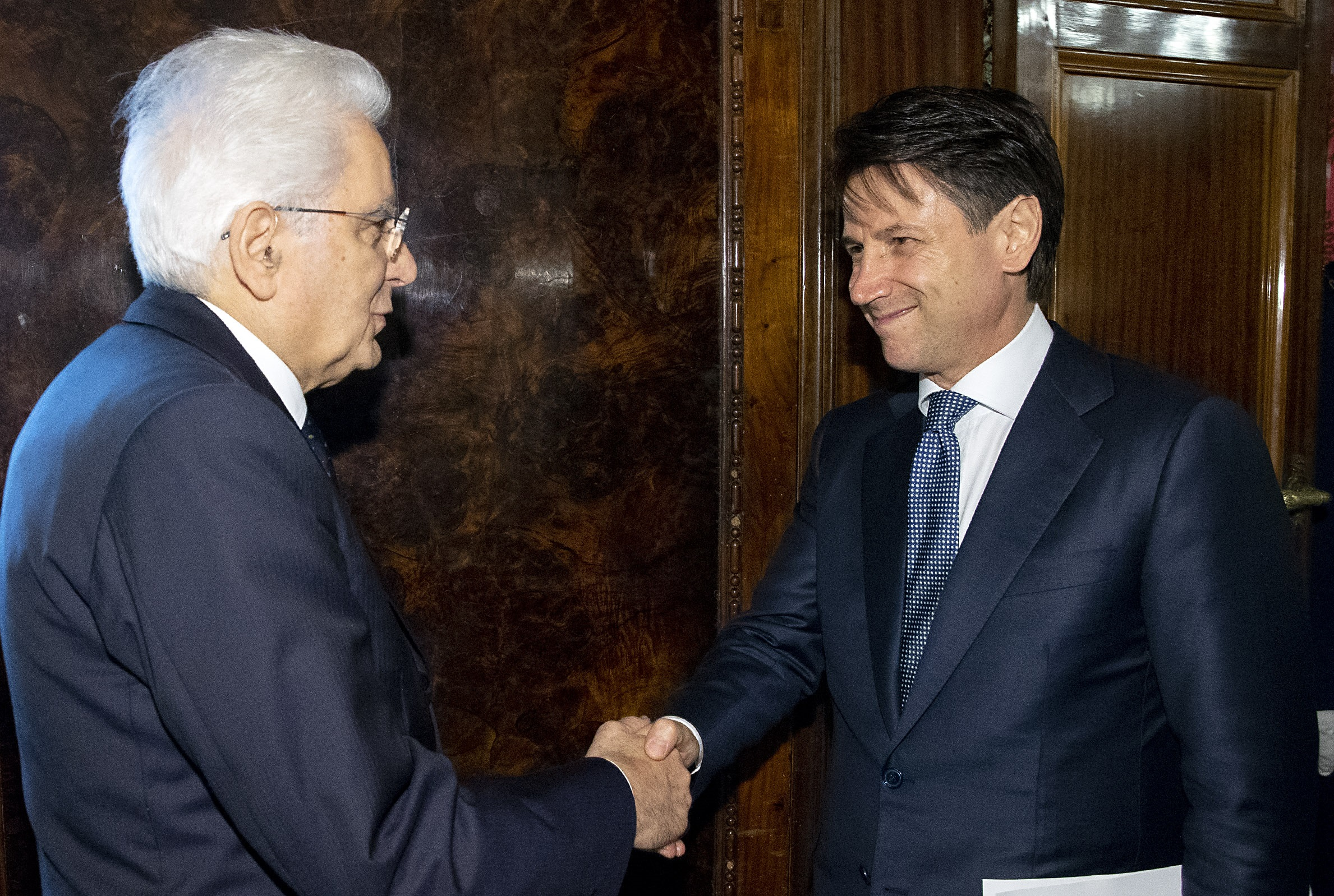
Mattarella with Giuseppe Conte at the Quirinal Palace

On 21 May, a private law professor, Giuseppe Conte, was proposed by Di Maio and Salvini for the role of Prime Minister of Italy. Despite reports in the Italian press suggesting that Mattarella still had significant reservations about the direction of the new government, Conte was invited to the Quirinal Palace on 23 May to receive the presidential mandate to form a new cabinet. In the traditional statement after the appointment, Conte said that he would be the "defense lawyer of Italian people".

On 27 May, Conte renounced his mandate due to conflicts between Salvini and Mattarella. Salvini had proposed university professor Paolo Savona as Italian Minister of Economy and Finances, but Mattarella strongly opposed the appointment, considering Savona too Eurosceptic. In his speech after Conte's resignation, Mattarella declared that the two parties wanted to bring Italy out of the eurozone and that, as the guarantor of the Italian constitution and the country's interest and stability, he could not allow this. Mattarella subsequently gave economist Carlo Cottarelli the presidential mandate to form a new government.

Mattarella's decision prompted furious reactions from the M5S, who called for Mattarella's impeachment, a move also supported by opposition party Brothers of Italy. The League did not support this action. Calls for impeachment were strongly criticized by Italian and international press. Luciano Fontana (editor of Corriere della Sera) defended Mattarella and said that "Di Maio and Salvini are responsible for this crisis", while Mario Calabresi (editor of la Repubblica) dismissed impeachment proposals as "delirious", and La Stampa called Di Maio and Meloni's proposal "extremely irresponsible". HuffPost editor Lucia Annunziata dismissed Di Maio and Salvini as "liars", while news magazine L'Espresso called them "subversive", and Le Monde praised Mattarella as an "intransigent guardian of the Constitution". The president was also defended by The Guardian, Libération, and Der Spiegel. German business newspaper Handelsblatt titled "Forza Mattarella!" ("Go Mattarella!") Marco Travaglio and Maurizio Belpietro (editors of Il Fatto Quotidiano and La Verità) criticized Mattarella's move as an abuse but recognized that it was not sufficient to start an impeachment procedure. After a few days, the M5S and the League agreed not to propose Savona as finance minister; on 31 May, Conte received again the presidential mandate to form the new cabinet. The new government was sworn in on 1 June.

==== Political crises of 2019 and 2021 ====
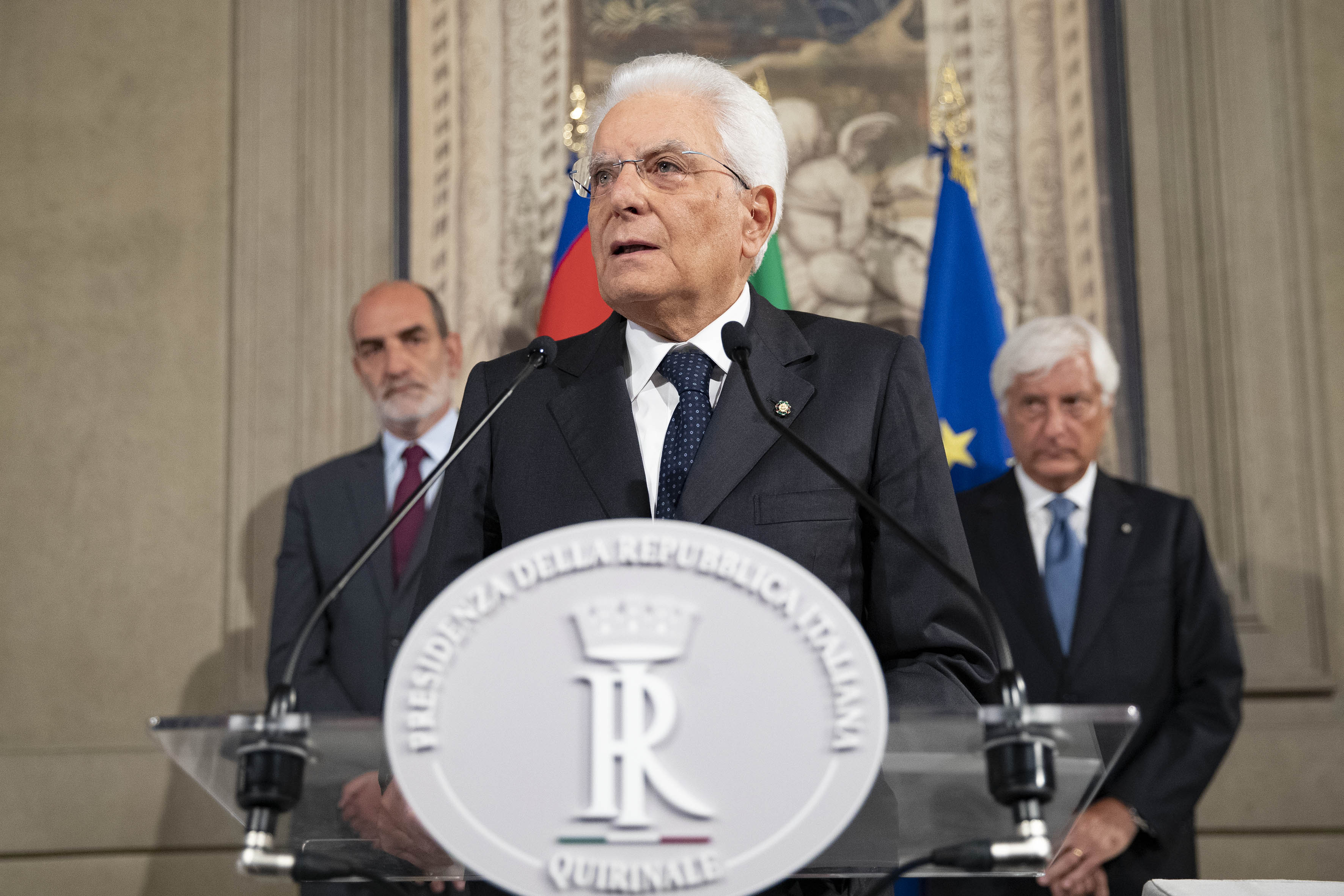
President Mattarella during the August 2019 consultations

In August 2019, Deputy Prime Minister Salvini launched a motion of no confidence against Conte, after growing tensions within the majority. Many political analysts believe the no-confidence motion was an attempt to force early elections to improve the League's standing in the Italian Parliament, ensuring that Salvini would become the next prime minister. On 20 August, following the parliamentary debate in which Conte accused Salvini of being a political opportunist who "had triggered the political crisis only to serve his personal interest", the prime minister resigned his post to President Mattarella. On the following day, Mattarella started the consultations with parliamentary groups.

During the round of consultations between Mattarella and the parliamentary groups, a possible new majority emerged, between the M5S and the Democratic Party (PD). On 28 August, the PD's leader Nicola Zingaretti favored keeping Conte at the head of the new government. On the following day, Mattarella received Conte to give him the task of forming a new cabinet. On 4 September, Conte introduced his new cabinet, which was sworn in at the Quirinal Palace on the following day. On 9 September 2019, the Chamber of Deputies expressed its confidence in the government with 343 votes in favour, 263 against, and 3 abstentions. On 10 September 2019, in the second vote of confidence in the Senate, 169 lawmakers voted in favour of the new government and 133 voted against.

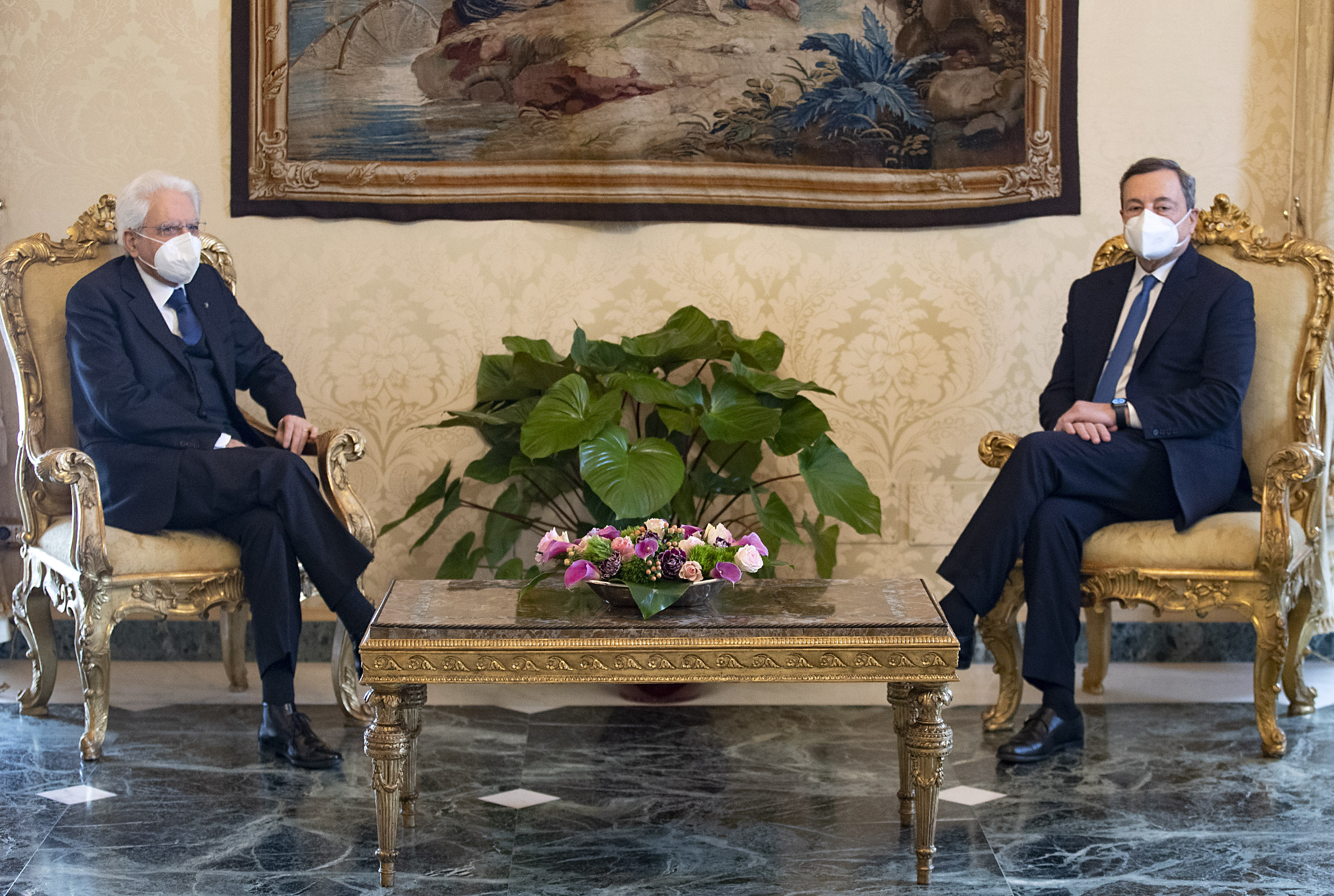
Mattarella and Mario Draghi at the Quirinal Palace in February 2021

In January 2021, Matteo Renzi, former prime minister and leader of Italia Viva (IV), who split from the PD in 2019, revoked his party's support to the government of Conte, who did not resign immediately. On 18 and 19 January, Renzi's party abstained and the government won the key confidence votes in the Chamber and in the Senate but failed in reaching an absolute majority in the Senate. On 26 January, Prime Minister Conte resigned from his office, prompting President Mattarella to start consultations for the formation of a new government.

In February, when the consultations for the formation of a Conte's third government failed, Mattarella gave Mario Draghi, former president of the European Central Bank, the task of forming a government of national unity. On 3 February, Draghi accepted with reservation the task of forming a new cabinet and started the consultations with the presidents of the two houses. After successful negotiations with parties including FI, the League, the M5S, and the PD, Draghi was sworn in as the prime minister on 13 February, pledging to oversee effective implementation of COVID-19 economic stimulus. Draghi's government has been described as a national unity government, as well as "president's government", a cabinet sponsored by and implemented by Mattarella.

==== COVID-19 pandemic ====
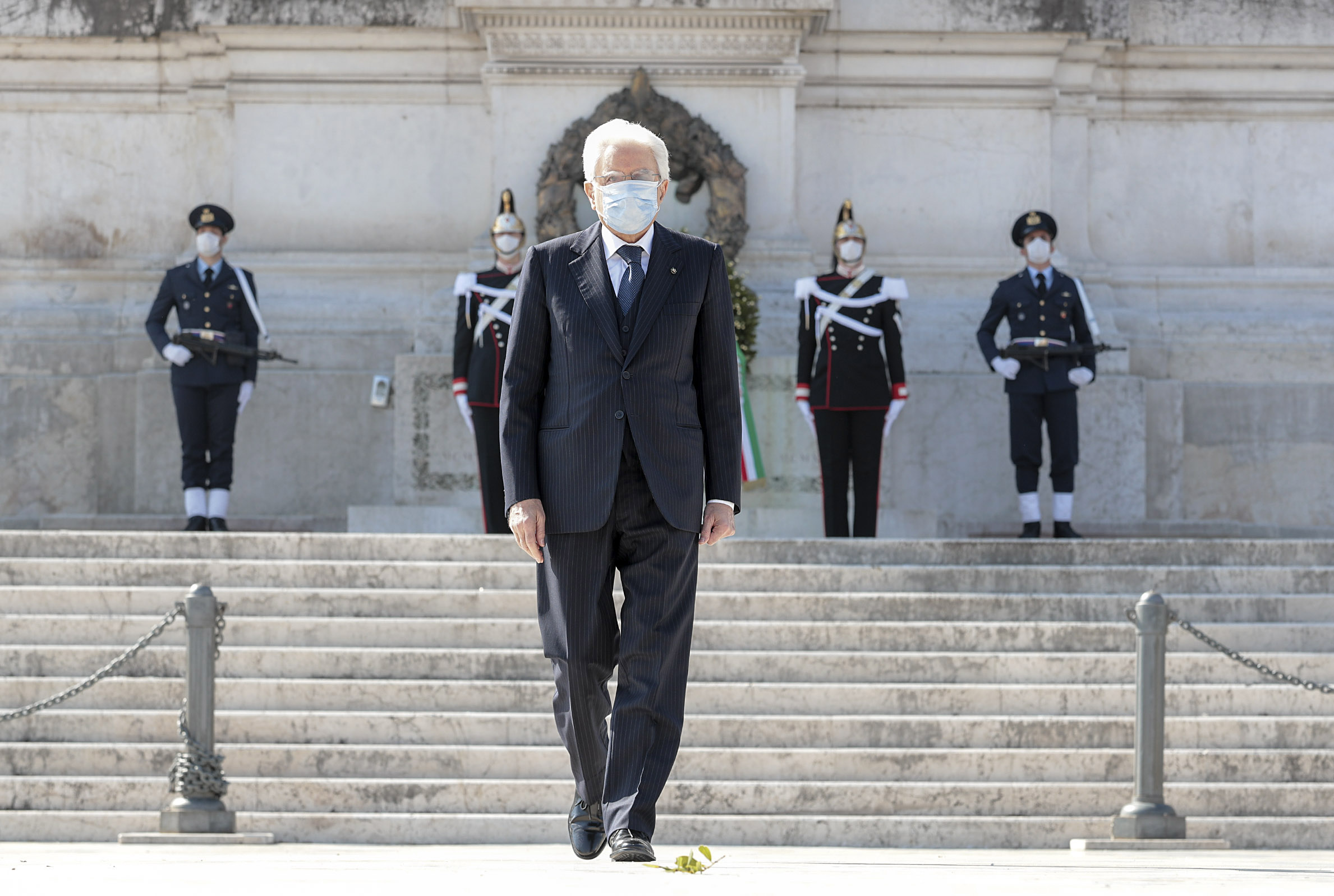
Mattarella wearing a protective mask at the Victor Emmanuel II Monument during the Liberation Day in April 2020

During Mattarella's presidency, Italy was hit by a major outbreak of the COVID-19 pandemic. In February 2020, Italy became one of the countries with the highest number of confirmed cases of COVID-19. As of January 2025, there have been more than 26 million COVID-19 cases confirmed and almost 200,000 deaths; although the pandemic mainly started in Lombardy, Emilia-Romagna, Piedmont, and Veneto, it then spread through the whole country.

On 22 February, the Council of Ministers introduced a bill to contain the COVID-19 outbreak, quarantining more than 50,000 people from 11 different municipalities in Northern Italy. After few days, schools and universities closed in the whole country. On 8 March, the Italian government extended the quarantine to the entire region of Lombardy and 14 other northern provinces, putting more than a quarter of the national population under pandemic lockdown. On the following day, the government extended the quarantine measures previously applied only in the "red zones" to the whole country, putting de facto 60 million people in lockdown. At the time of its application, this measure was described as the largest lockdown in human history. On 18 May, the lockdown officially ended and the government allowed the re-openings of bars, restaurants, barbers and gyms. The possibility to travel between different regions was restored on 3 June.

Starting from July, many countries in Europe, including Italy, witnessed a new rise in detected COVID-19 cases. On 7 October, the parliament postponed the end of the state of emergency to 31 January 2021, and Prime Minister Conte imposed the use of protection mask outdoors. On 13 October 2020, the Italian government reintroduced stricter rules to limit the spread of COVID-19. Demonstrations and gatherings of people were strictly forbidden. Regions and municipalities were given the power to only tighten but not release containment measures. On 25 October, the government introduced new restrictions, imposing the closing of gyms, swimming pools, theatres, and cinemas, as well as the closing of bars and restaurants by 6 pm. Restrictions were later confirmed until April 2021 by the new government led by Mario Draghi.

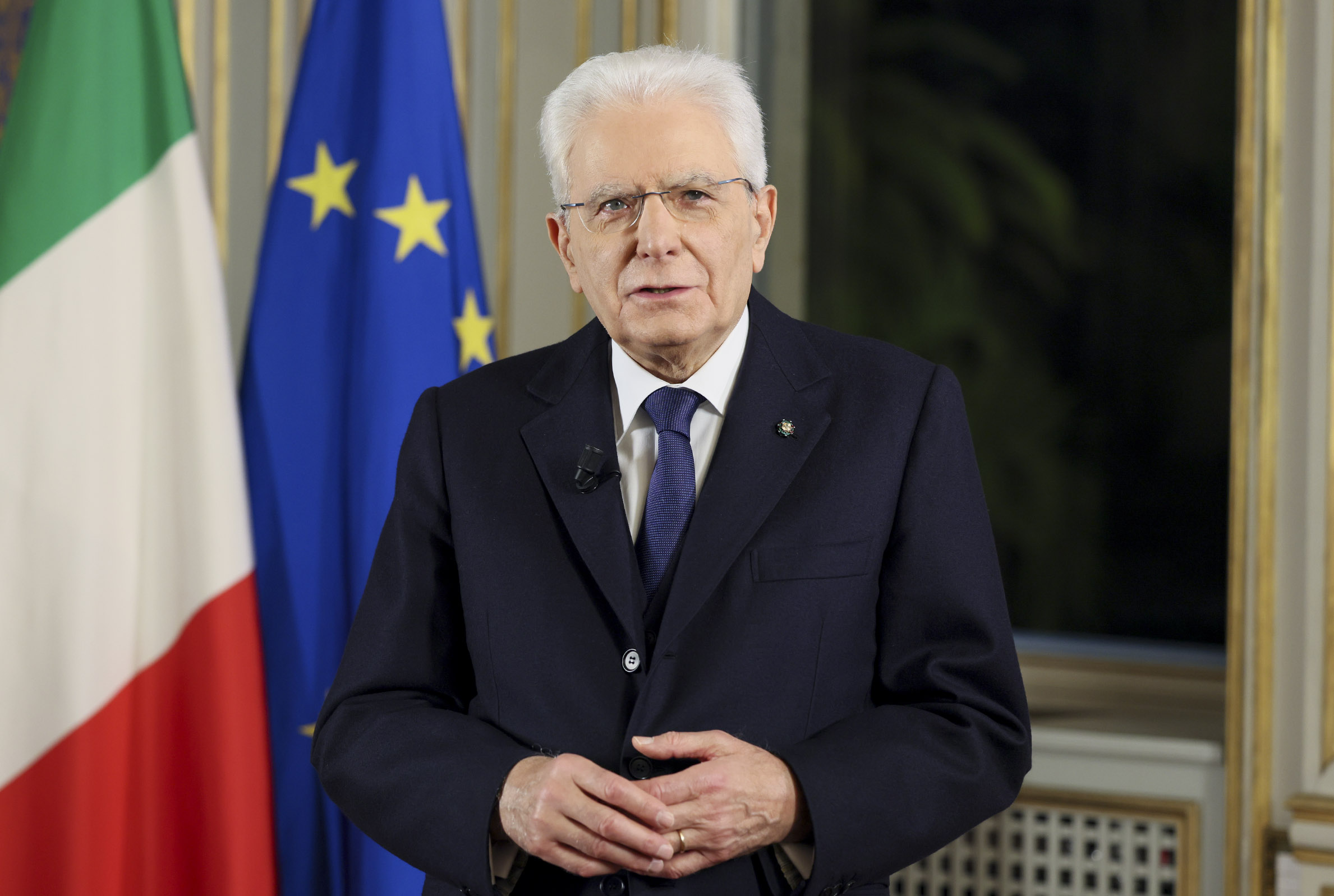
Mattarella on 31 December 2021 during the last speech of his first term as president

On 15 March 2021, Prime Minister Draghi placed the majority of Italy under "full lockdown" conditions, with non-essential businesses closing and travel restricted, in response to an increase in the transmission of COVID-19; unlike the 2020 lockdown, factories and some other workplaces were allowed to remain open. Draghi vowed that Italy would see its vaccination programme triple in April, reaching 500,000 people per day by that time.

In June 2021, the more contagious SARS-CoV-2 Delta variant became predominant in Italy. In August 2021, the government extended the requirement of the EU Digital COVID Certificate, also known as Green Pass, to the participation in sports events and music festivals but also to the access to indoor places like bars, restaurants and gyms, as well as to long-distance public transportation, in an attempt to contain the spread of new variants. On 15 October, Italy became the first country in the world to establish a mandatory COVID-19 vaccination certificate for the entire work force, public, and private.

On 31 December, during what was anticipated to be his last speech to the nation as president and within a dramatic increasing in COVID-19 cases, Mattarella thanked all the Italians who got vaccinated, stressing that "wasting vaccines was an offense to anyone who didn't have them". Mattarella also stated that during his seven-year term he never felt alone, thanking Italians to have shown "the best face of the country".

=== Second term (2022–present) ===
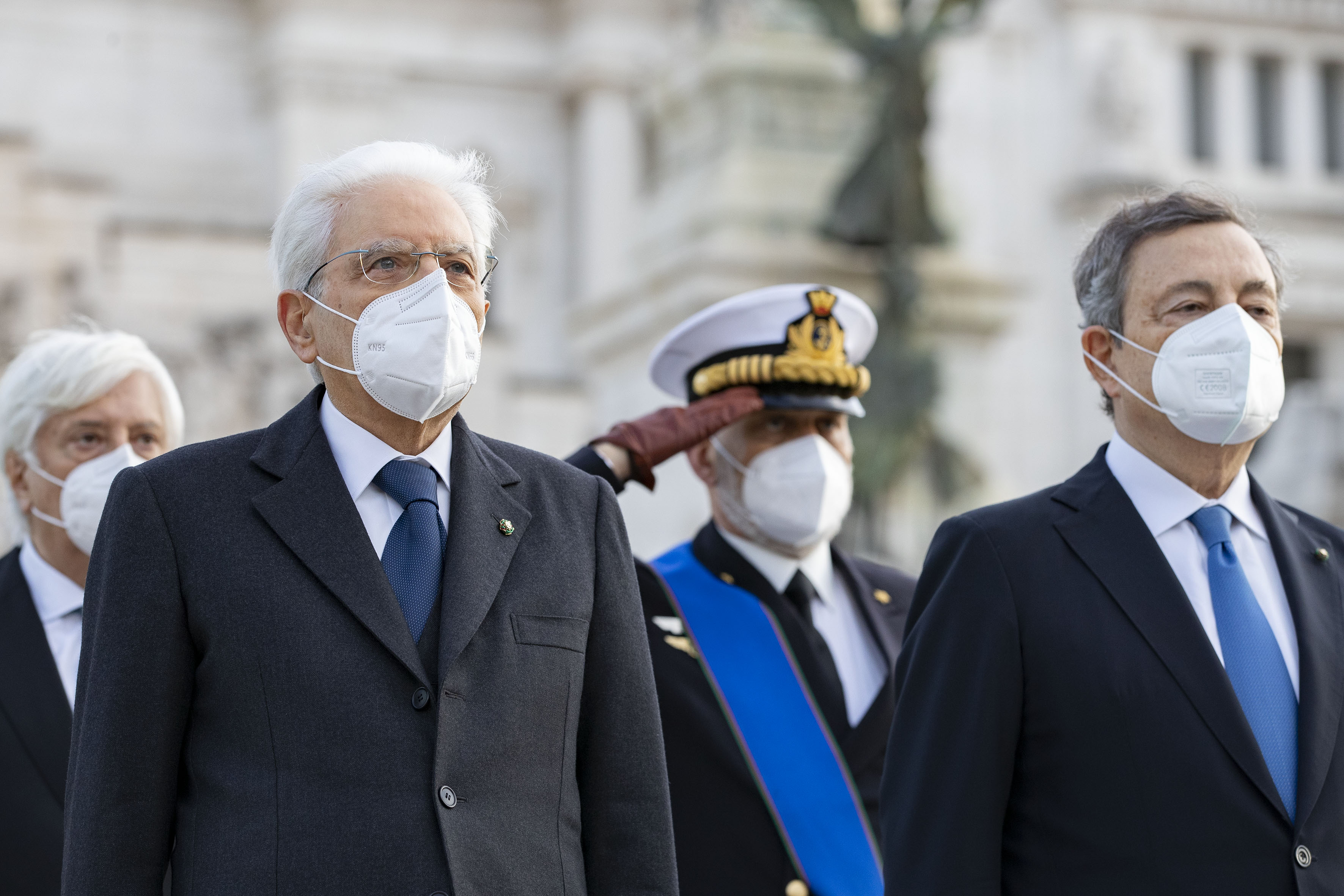
President Mattarella and Prime Minister Mario Draghi at the Victor Emmanuel II Monument on inauguration day

During 2021, despite high popularity amid the COVID-19 pandemic in Italy, President Mattarella refused to run for a second term despite various political forces asking him to do so, recalling similar remarks made by his predecessors Antonio Segni and Giovanni Leone. Despite his firm denial, Mattarella received several votes in the ballots, notably reaching 336 votes in the sixth ballot and 387 in the seventh one, even if no major party or coalition formally supported him as a candidate. On the morning of 29 January, after all other possible candidacies failed and the two major coalitions could not agree on a shared candidate, the re-election of incumbent president Mattarella became a serious alternative. On the same day, Mattarella agreed to serve a second term, and was re-elected with 759 votes, as most party leaders and Prime Minister Mario Draghi asked him to accept their joint nomination for another term.

On 3 February, President Mattarella was sworn in for his second term in front of a joint assembly of the parliament. He called for unity ("We still need to work together to strengthen Italy, beyond the current difficulties"), and also commented on the Russo-Ukrainian crisis, stating: "We cannot accept that now, without even the pretext of competition between different political and economic systems, the winds of confrontation are once again blowing across a continent that has experienced the tragedies of the First and Second World Wars." Mattarella added: "We must appeal to our resources and those of allied and friendly countries so that the displays of strength give way to mutual understanding so that no people should fear aggression from their neighbours." Following the 2022 Russian invasion of Ukraine, Mattarella strongly condemned Vladimir Putin's decision to attack Ukraine, describing the invasion as a "brutal war", and called it a "nineteenth-century-like attack that evoked frightening scenarios, with humanity as the protagonist of its own ruin".

==== 2022 government crisis ====
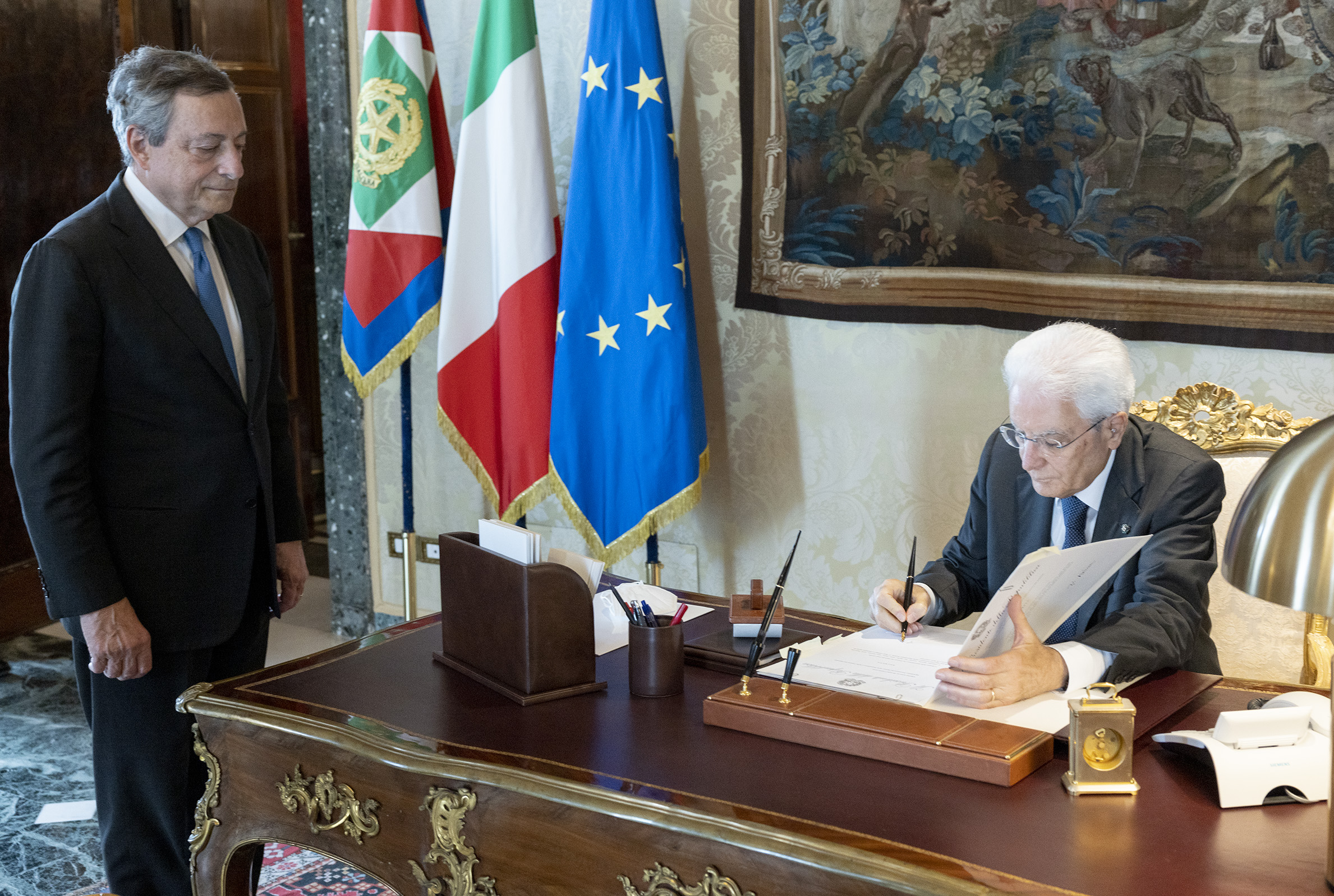
Mattarella dissolving the Parliament following Draghi's resignation

On 13 July 2022, the M5S abstained during the confidence vote on the decreto aiuti (English: aid decree), a bill that introduced stimulus to contrast the ongoing energy crisis. On the following day, the M5S left the Senate floor during the voting process, de facto opening a government crisis within the Draghi's cabinet. Following the M5S's abstention, Prime Minister Draghi consulted with President Mattarella about the crisis; after a few hours, he formally resigned as Prime Minister citing a lack of political trust and confidence within the government's majority. Mattarella rejected the resignation because the government had largely won the confidence vote in the Senate and invited the prime minister to address the parliament, explaining the political situation.

On 20 July, the government failed to reach the absolute majority in the confidence vote as the League, FI, and the M5S decided not to take part in the ballot, de facto causing the fall of the government. On the following day, after a speech in front of the Chamber of Deputies, Draghi officially resigned as prime minister. Mattarella accepted his resignation; Draghi remained in office as caretaker prime minister until the formation of the Meloni government following a snap election. On the same day, Mattarella summoned Draghi, Roberto Fico, and Elisabetta Casellati to the Quirinal Palace and then dissolved the parliament. In a brief speech to the nation, Mattarella stated: "Pauses are not possible at the moment we are going through: energy costs have consequences for families and businesses, economic difficulties must be addressed, there are many obligations to be closed in the interest of Italy."

==== 2022 general election, government formation, and geopolitical tensions ====
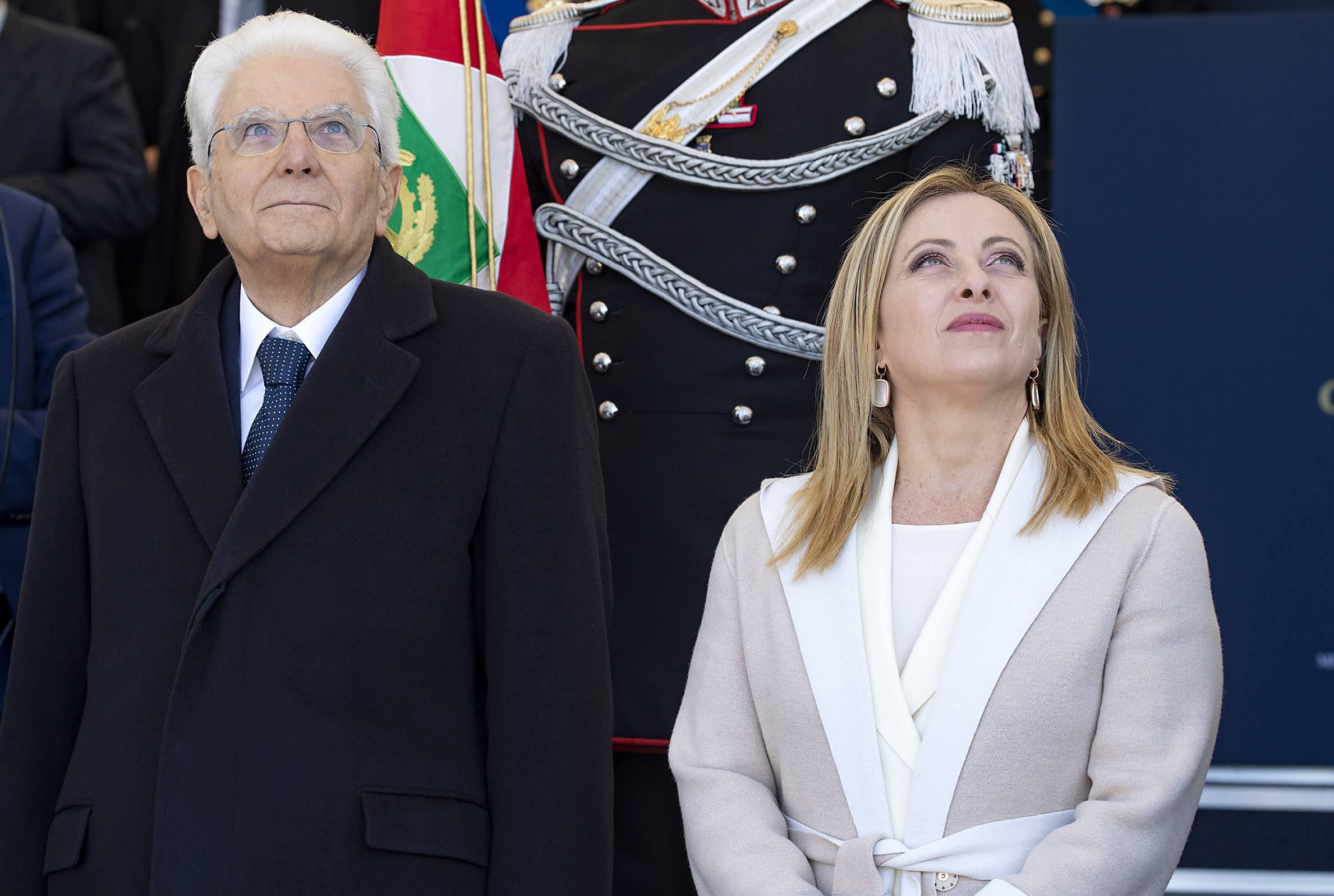
Mattarella with Giorgia Meloni during a military parade in 2023

The 2022 general election, held on 25 September, was characterized by a strong showing of the centre-right coalition led by Giorgia Meloni's Brothers of Italy (FdI), which won an absolute majority of seats in the Italian Parliament. On 20 October, a few days after the elections of the presidents of the two houses of Parliament, Ignazio La Russa of FdI on 13 October for the Senate of the Republic, and Lorenzo Fontana of the League on 14 October for the Chamber of Deputies, Mattarella officially launched consultations on the formation of a new cabinet.

On the following day, the centre-right coalition formally proposed Meloni as its candidate to the premiership. In the afternoon, Mattarella summoned Meloni to the Quirinal Palace and gave her the task of forming a new cabinet. The Cabinet was announced on 21 October and was officially sworn in on 22 October. It was one of the fastest government formations in the history of the Italian Republic. Meloni became the first woman to serve as Prime Minister of Italy.

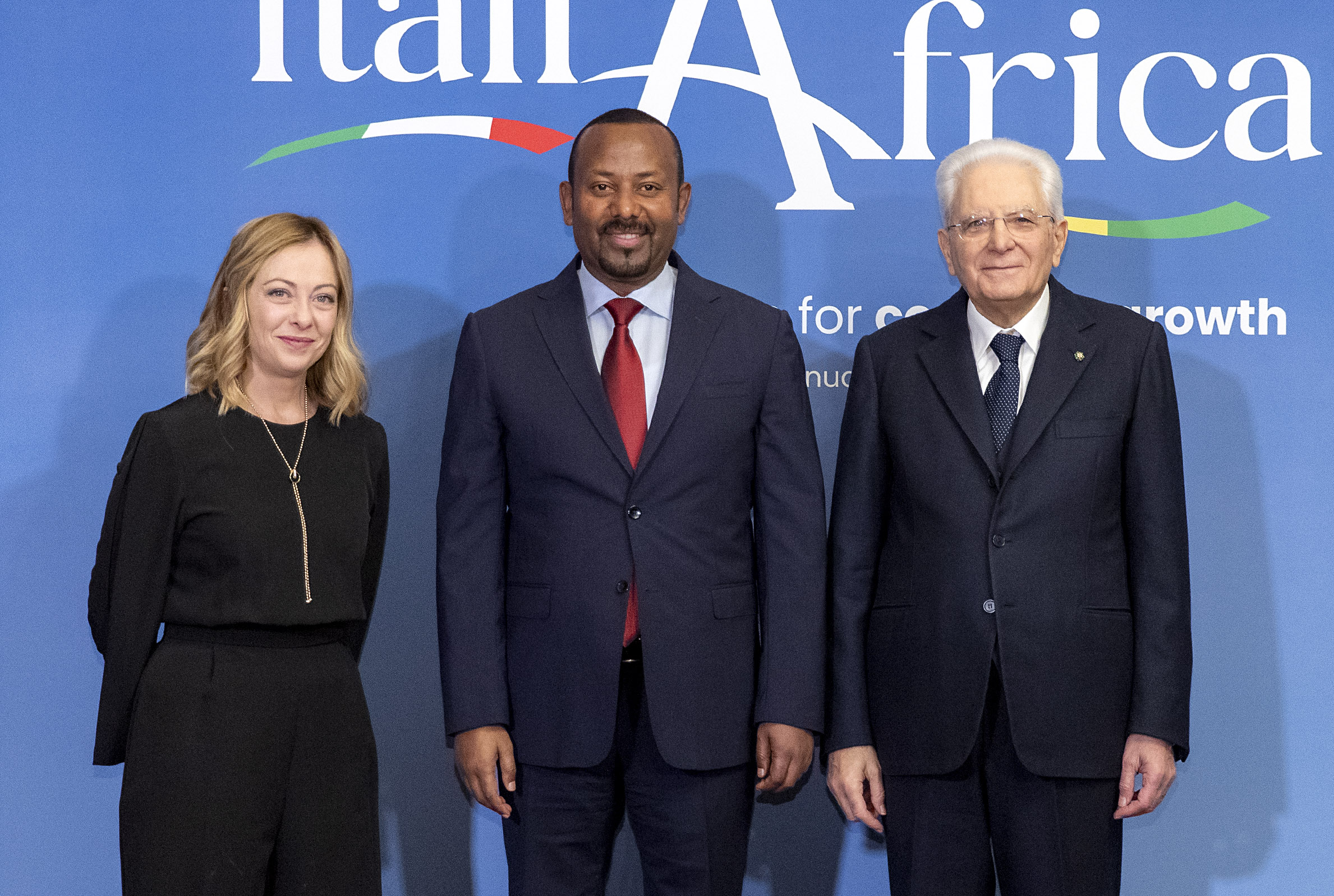
Mattarella and Giorgia Meloni with Ethiopian Prime Minister Abiy Ahmed at the 2024 Italy–Africa Summit in Rome

In February 2023, Mattarella officially asked the government to modify the law regarding beach concessions in Italy, which was considered against both the European law and the opinion of Italy's Council of State. He also criticised the Milleproroghe (English: Thousand extensions), a decree law promoted by the government aimed at resolving urgent provisions by the end of the current year and described by Mattarella as a "mere container of the most different regulatory interventions".

In February 2024, during a period of students' protests against both the Gaza war and the policies promoted by Meloni's government, often strongly repressed by the police, Mattarella criticized the use of the force and complained with the interior minister Matteo Piantedosi, stating that "the authority of the police force is not measured by truncheons but by its ability to ensure security while protecting, at the same time, the freedom to express opinions publicly". The president also added that with young people "using truncheons is a failure".

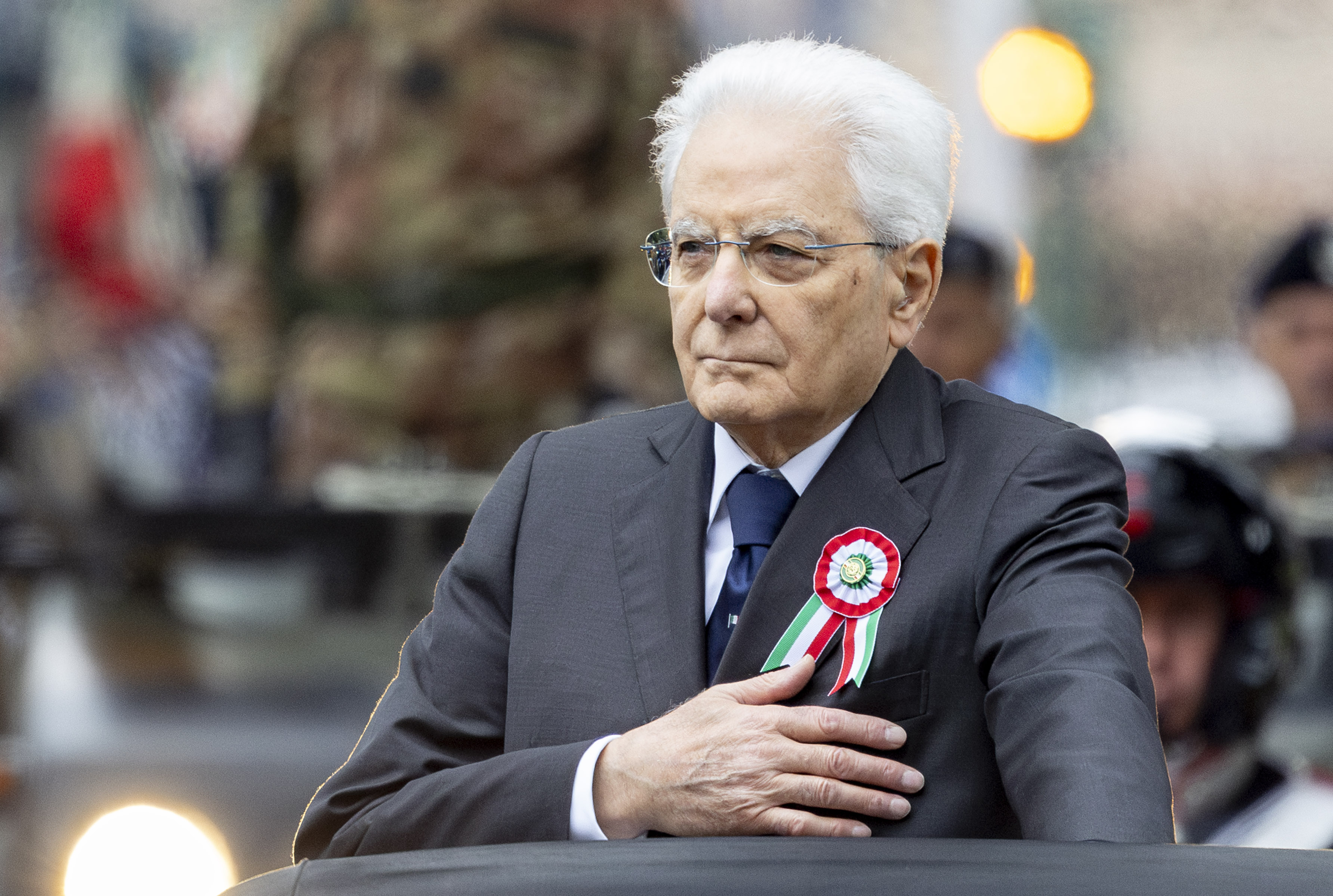
Mattarella during the 2024 Republic Day parade in Rome

Ahead of the 2024 European Parliament election in Italy held in May, Mattarella invited Italians to vote by stating that voting is "a civic duty and a precious opportunity to reflect together on the reasons that animate the life of our community. ... With other free peoples of the continent we decided to give life to a community of which in a few days we will celebrate its sovereignty through the election of the European Parliament." These words were deeply criticised by the League, especially by senator Claudio Borghi, who asked for the resignation of Mattarella, asserting that Italy must not cede sovereignty to the EU. After a few days, speaking during a Carabinieri ceremony, President Mattarella stated that "due to the historical moment that Italy and Europe are experiencing, we need loyalty to the Republic more than ever."

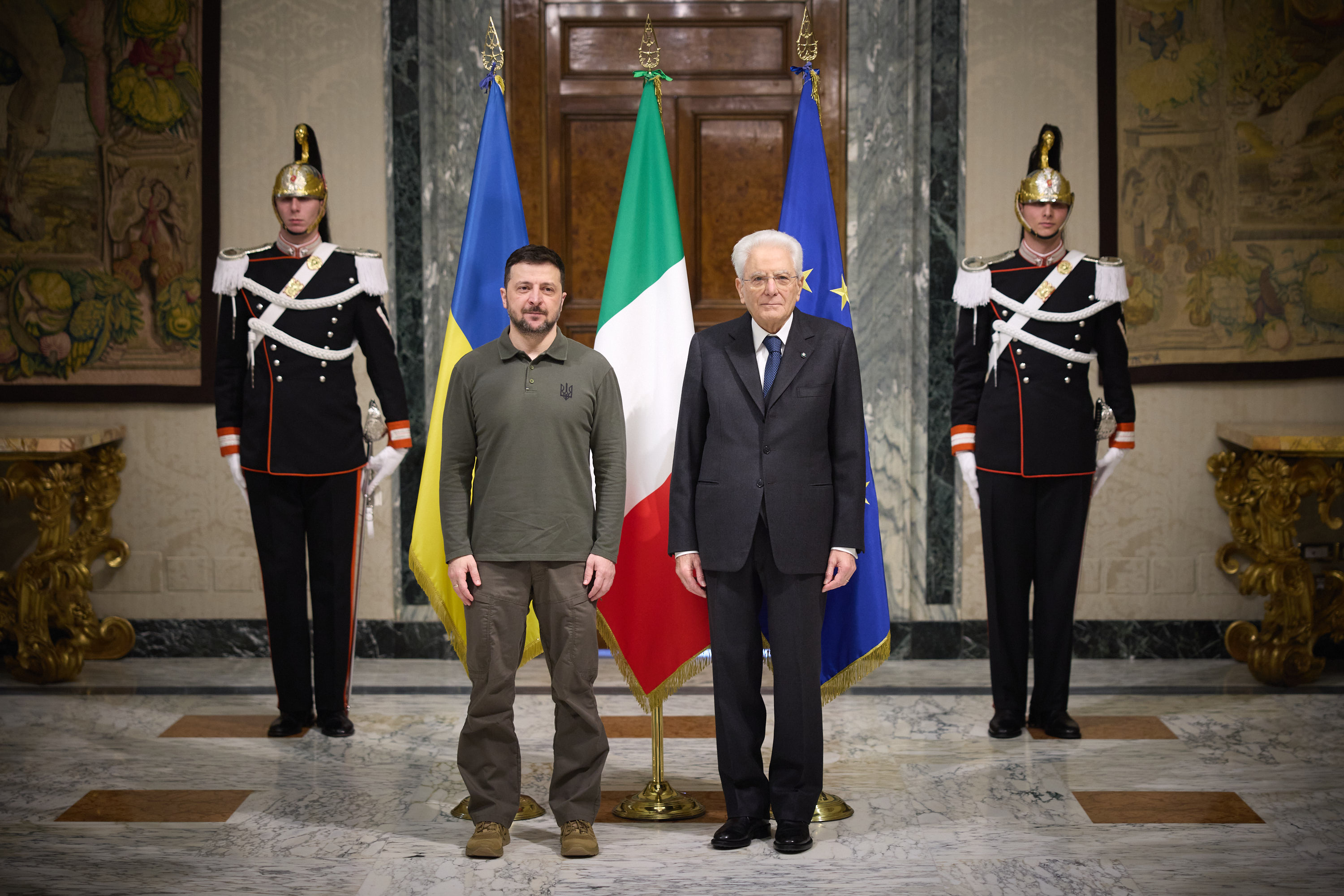
Mattarella with Ukrainian president Volodymyr Zelenskyy in 2025

In February 2025, intervening in Marseille regarding a possible new push in negotiations between Russia and Ukraine following the re-election of Donald Trump, Mattarella commented: "The appeasement policies adopted by European powers towards the proponents of aggressive foreign policies were a testimony to a futile attempt to contain destructive ambitions. [...] Firmness would, most likely, have prevented the war. Keeping in mind the current conflicts, can it work today?" After a few days, Russia's Ministry of Foreign Affairs labeled Mattarella's statement as "offensive and outrageous", having linkened Russia to Nazi Germany. After a few days, the Russian foreign ministry's spokesperson Maria Zakharova added that his words would have had consequences.

== Personal life and public image ==
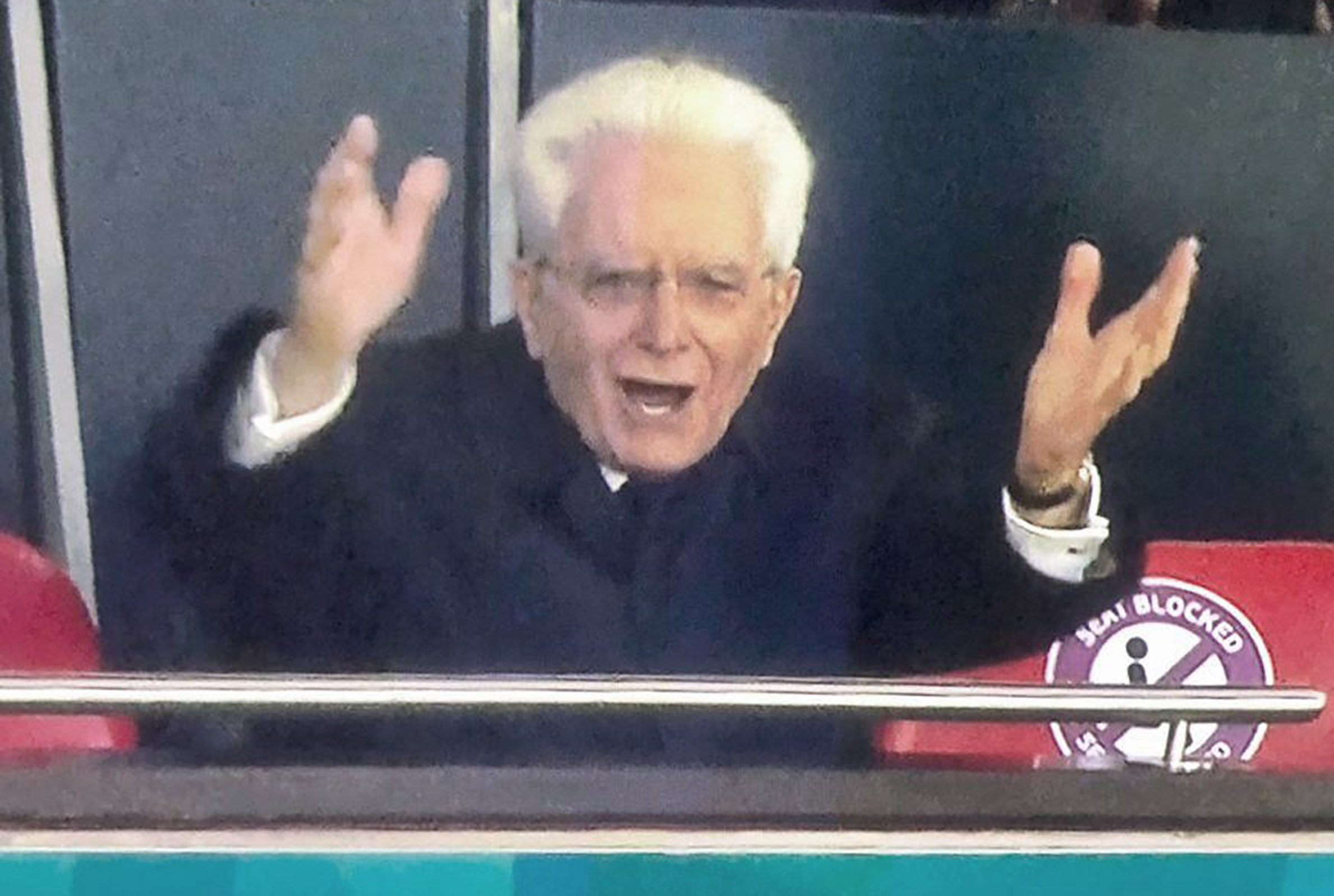
Mattarella celebrating during the UEFA Euro 2020 final

Mattarella married Marisa Chiazzese, daughter of Lauro Chiazzese, a professor of Roman law and rector of the University of Palermo, in 1966; his brother Piersanti was married to Marisa's sister Irma. Mattarella and his wife have three children: Laura (born 1967), Bernardo Giorgio (1968), and Francesco (1973). Marisa Chiazzese died from a tumour in 2012. Their daughter Laura has acted as de facto First Lady, accompanying her father on official trips outside Italy.

Mattarella is Catholic. Best known for its involvement in politics, Mattarella's family has held various national and regional offices spanning across two generations. His father Bernardo was a member of the Constituent Assembly and served as minister in various governments from 1953 until 1966. His brother Piersanti was murdered in 1980 in Sicily by Cosa Nostra while serving as president of the Regional Government of Sicily. Another brother, Antonio, was managing director of the Investment Banking division of Goldman Sachs from 2005 to 2017.

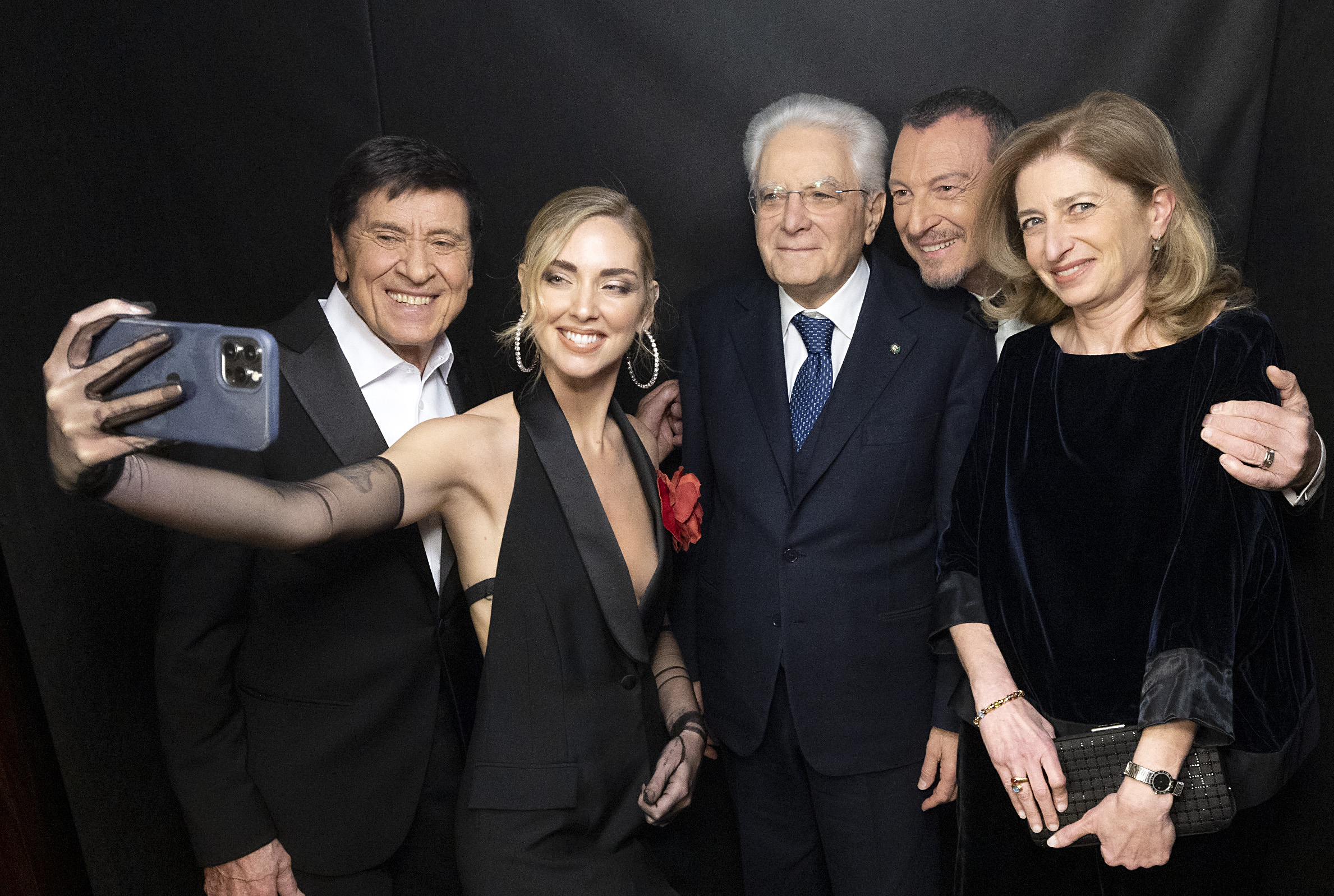
Mattarella taking a selfie with Gianni Morandi, Chiara Ferragni, Amadeus, and his daughter Laura, before Sanremo Music Festival 2023

Mattarella is an association football fan and a supporter of Inter Milan. As head of state, he attended the UEFA Euro 2020, which included Italy as one of the hosts, and the UEFA Euro 2020 final at Wembley Stadium on 11 July 2021, which Italy won, beating England on penalties following a 1–1 draw after extra time. On the following day, he hosted the national team at the Quirinal Palace to celebrate. On 6 February 2026, he opened the Winter Olympics in Milan, becoming the third president to do so. A pre-filmed video segment introduced Mattarella depicting him riding a tram in Milan driven by Valentino Rossi and entering San Siro stadium. In March, he also opened the Winter Paralympics in Verona.

At the end of his first term, Mattarella's approval rating was among the highest ever for an Italian president and the highest among Western world leaders. According to the polling firm Ixè, Mattarella's approval rating in December 2021 was at 77%, while it stood at 66% according to SWG, and 65% according to Quorum–YouTrend. In February 2023, one year after his re-election as president, his approval rating was still very high, remaining at 77% according to Ixè and 65% for Quorum–YouTrend. In February 2025, after ten years of presidency, his approval rating was still over 70%.

On 7 February 2023, Mattarella became the first president to attend the Sanremo Music Festival. On 15 April 2025, Mattarella underwent heart surgery to have a pacemaker fitted.

== Electoral history ==
Election	House	Constituency	Party	Votes	Result
1983	Chamber of Deputies	Palermo–Trapani–Agrigento–Caltanissetta	DC	119,969	Elected
1987	Chamber of Deputies	Palermo–Trapani–Agrigento–Caltanissetta	DC	143,935	Elected
1992	Chamber of Deputies	Palermo–Trapani–Agrigento–Caltanissetta	DC	50,280	Elected
1994	Chamber of Deputies	Sicily 1	PPI	– (Note: Elected in a closed list proportional representation system.)	Elected
1996	Chamber of Deputies	Sicily 1	PPI	–	Elected
2001	Chamber of Deputies	Trentino-Alto Adige/Südtirol	DL	–	Elected
2006	Chamber of Deputies	Sicily 1	DL	–	Elected

=== Presidential elections ===
2015 presidential election (4th ballot)
Candidate	Supported by	Votes	%
Sergio Mattarella	PD, NCD, SC, UDC, SEL	665	65.9
Ferdinando Imposimato	M5S	127	12.5
Others		85	8.4
Blank or invalid votes		118	11.6
Abstentions		14	1.3
Total		1,009	100.0

2022 presidential election (8th ballot)
Candidate	Supported by	Votes	%
Sergio Mattarella	M5S, Lega, PD, FI, IV, CI, LeU, Aut, Az, +Eu	759	75.2
Carlo Nordio	FdI	90	8.92
Nino Di Matteo	Alt	37	3.7
Others		59	5.8
Blank or invalid votes		38	3.8
Abstentions		26	2.6
Total		1,009	100.0

== Honours ==
=== National honours ===
- Italy: Head and Grand Cross with Collar of the Order of Merit of the Italian Republic (3 February 2015)
- Italy: Head of the Military Order of Italy (3 February 2015)
- Italy: Head of the Order of Merit for Labour (3 February 2015)
- Italy: Head of the Order of the Star of Italy (3 February 2015)
- Italy: Recipient (gold medal) of the Italian Order of Merit for Culture and Art (27 December 1991)
- Italy: Grand Cross of the Order of Merit of the Italian Red Cross (9 July 2019)

=== Foreign honours ===
- Algeria: Collar of the National Order of Merit (6 November 2021)
- Angola: Recipient of the Order of Agostinho Neto (25 May 2023)
- Argentina: Collar of the Order of the Liberator General San Martin (8 May 2017)
- Armenia: Grand Cross of the Order of Glory (30 July 2018)
- Austria: Grand Star of the Decoration of Honour for Services to the Republic of Austria (1 July 2019)
- Azerbaijan: Heydar Aliyev Order (18 July 2018)
- Belgium: Grand Cordon of the Order of Leopold (1 December 2021)
- Brazil: Grand Collar of the National Order of the Southern Cross (15 July 2024)
- Bulgaria: Grand Cross of the Order of the Balkan Mountains (12 September 2016)
- Cameroon: Grand Cross of the Order of Valour (11 March 2016)
- Cyprus: Grand Collar of the Order of Makarios III (26 February 2024)
- Estonia: Collar of the Order of the Cross of Terra Mariana (2 July 2018)
- Finland: Grand Cross with Collar of the Order of the White Rose (27 September 2017)
- France: Grand Cross of the Order of the National Order of the Legion of Honour (5 July 2021)
- Germany: Grand Cross Special Class of the Order of Merit of the Federal Republic of Germany (19 September 2019)
- Greece: Grand Cross of the Order of the Redeemer (26 November 2015)
- Ivory Coast: Grand Cross of the National Order of the Ivory Coast (4 April 2024)
- Kazakhstan: Member 1st Class of the Order of Friendship (29 September 2025)
- Latvia: Commander Grand Cross with Chain of the Order of the Three Stars (29 June 2018)
- Lithuania: Grand Cross with Golden Chain of the Order of Vytautas the Great (5 July 2018)
- Luxembourg: Knight of the Order of the Gold Lion of the House of Nassau (10 June 2025)
- Malta: Honorary Companion of Honour with Collar of the National Order of Merit (13 September 2017)
- Mexico: Collar of the Mexican Order of the Aztec Eagle (4 July 2016)
- Monaco: Knight Grand Cross of the Order of Saint-Charles (2 October 2026)
- Montenegro: Member 2sd class of the Order of the Republic of Montenegro (18 February 2025)
- Netherlands: Knight Grand Cross of the Order of the Netherlands Lion (20 June 2017)
- Norway: Grand Cross of the Royal Norwegian Order of Saint Olav (6 April 2016)
- Paraguay: Collar of the National Order of Merit (19 January 2023)
- Poland: Knight of the Order of the White Eagle (17 April 2023)
- Portugal: Grand Collar of the Order of Liberty (6 December 2017)
- Qatar: Recipient of the Sword of the Founder Sheikh Jassim bin Mohammed bin Thani (21 October 2024)
- Romania: Collar of the Order of the Star of Romania (11 June 2016)
- San Marino: Collar of the Order of San Marino (5 October 2021)
- Slovenia: Member of the Order for Exceptional Merits (21 October 2021)
- South Korea: Recipient of the Grand Order of Mugunghwa (7 October 2023)
- Sovereign Military Order of Malta: Collar of the Order pro Merito Melitensi (27 October 2016)
- Spain:
  - Knight of the Collar of the Royal Order of Isabella the Catholic (8 November 2021)
  - Knight of the Collar of the Royal and Distinguished Spanish Order of Charles III (11 December 2024)
- Sweden: Knight of the Royal Order of the Seraphim (13 November 2018)
- United Arab Emirates: Collar of the Order of Zayed (23 February 2025)
- United Kingdom:
  - Honorary Knight Grand Cross of the Most Honourable Order of the Bath (GCB) (8 April 2025)
  - Honorary Knight Commander of the Most Excellent Order of the British Empire (KBE) (as Minister of Defence) (16 October 2000)
- Vatican City:
  - Knight with the Collar of the Order of Pope Pius IX (17 April 2015)
  - Paul VI Prize (29 May 2023)

Political offices
Preceded by Gaetano Gifuni	Minister for Parliamentary Relations; 1987–1989	Succeeded by Egidio Sterpa
Preceded by Giovanni Galloni	Minister of Public Education; 1989–1990	Succeeded by Gerardo Bianco
Preceded by Walter Veltroni	Deputy Prime Minister of Italy; 1998–1999	Vacant Title next held by Gianfranco Fini
Preceded by Carlo Scognamiglio	Minister of Defence; 1999–2001	Succeeded by Antonio Martino
Preceded by Giorgio Napolitano	President of Italy; 2015–present	Incumbent
Legal offices
Preceded by Ugo De Siervo	Judge of the Constitutional Court; 2011–2015	Succeeded by Augusto Barbera
Order of precedence
First	Order of precedence of Italy; President of the Republic	Succeeded by Ignazio La Russa as President of the Senate
