= Paolo Barile =

Italian jurist and politician (1917–2000)

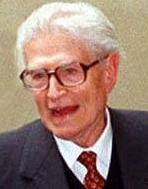

Minister for Parliamentary Relations
- In office 4 May 1993 – 11 May 1994
- Prime Minister: Carlo Azeglio Ciampi
- Preceded by: Augusto Antonio Barbera
- Succeeded by: Giuliano Ferrara

Personal details
- Born: 10 September 1917 Bologna, Kingdom of Italy
- Died: 1 June 2000 (aged 82) Florence, Italy
- Education: Sapienza University of Rome
- Profession: Jurist, lawyer, academic

Paolo Barile (10 September 1917 – 1 June 2000) was an Italian jurist, lawyer, politician, and academic. A leading scholar of constitutional law, he served as minister for Parliamentary Relations in the Ciampi Cabinet from 1993 to 1994. He was professor at the universities of Siena and Florence.
