= Silvana Sciarra =

Italian judge (born 1948)

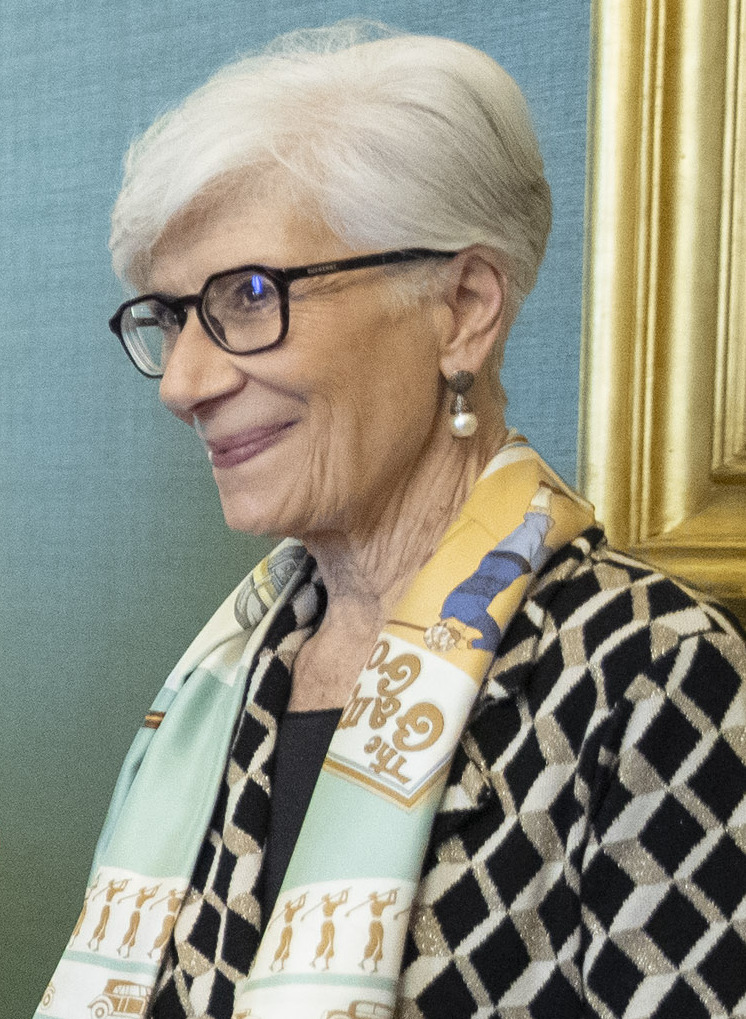
- Silvana Sciarra

President of the Constitutional Court of Italy
- In office 20 September 2022 – 11 November 2023
- Preceded by: Giuliano Amato
- Succeeded by: Augusto Barbera

Judge of the Constitutional Court of Italy
- In office 11 November 2014 – 11 November 2023
- Appointed by: Italian Parliament

Personal details
- Born: 24 July 1948 (age 78) Trani, Apulia, Italy
- Education: University of Bari
- Profession: University professor

Silvana Sciarra (born 24 July 1948) is an Italian jurist and academic. She served as a judge of the Constitutional Court of Italy from November 2014 to November 2023 and served as its president from 20 September 2022 to 11 November 2023.

== Career ==
Sciarra was born in Trani. She taught European Labour and Social Law at the European University Institute between 1994 and 2003. She was a professor of labour law at the University of Florence and the University of Siena before being appointed to the Constitutional Court by the Italian Parliament on 6 November 2014. In the parliamentary election she obtained 630 out of a necessary 570 votes. She was sworn in on 11 November 2014.

She is the first woman elected by the Italian Parliament as a judge of the Constitutional Court. Previously, she was a Harkness Fellow at UCLA and Harvard Law School (1974-1976). She was a Fulbright Fellow and visiting professor at several universities, among which Warwick (Leverhulme Professor), Columbia Law School (BNL Professor), Cambridge (where she held the Arthur Goodhart Chair in Legal Science 2006-2007), Stockholm, Lund, University College London. She holds a Ph.D. Honoris Causa in law at the universities of Stockholm (2006) and Hasselt (2012).

Legal offices
Preceded by Giuliano Amato	President of the Constitutional Court of Italy; 2022–2023	Succeeded by Augusto Antonio Barbera
