= Ugo Zampetti =

Italian civil servant

Ugo Zampetti OMRI
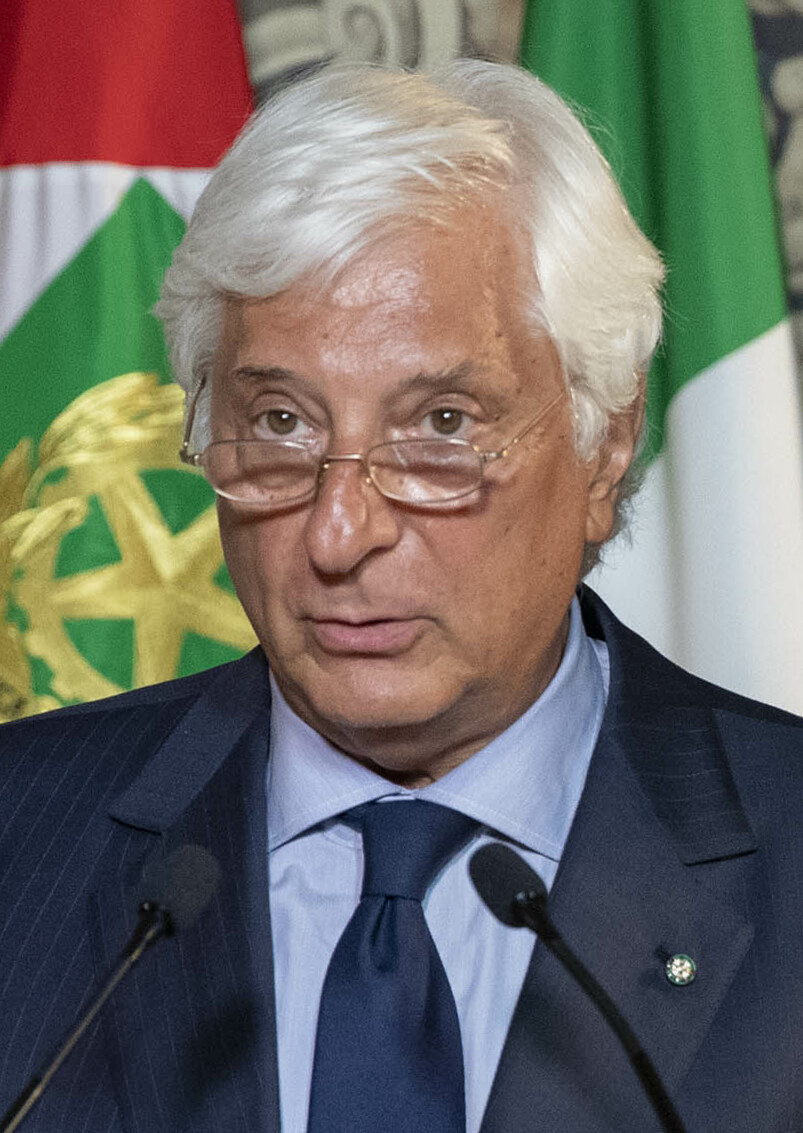
- Zampetti in 2019

Secretary General of the President of Italy
- Incumbent
- Assumed office 16 February 2015
- President: Sergio Mattarella
- Preceded by: Donato Marra

Secretary General of the Chamber of Deputies
- In office 11 November 1999 – 31 December 2014
- President: Luciano Violante; Pier Ferdinando Casini; Fausto Bertinotti; Gianfranco Fini; Laura Boldrini
- Preceded by: Mauro Zampini
- Succeeded by: Lucia Pagano

Personal details
- Born: 23 December 1949 (age 76) Rome, Italy
- Education: Sapienza University of Rome

Ugo Zampetti OMRI (Italian: [ˈuːɡо dzamˈpetti]; born 12 December 1949) is an Italian civil servant. Zampetti is serving as Secretary General of the President of Italy since 16 February 2015, appointed by President Sergio Mattarella. He also served as Secretary General of the Chamber of Deputies from 11 November 1999 until 31 December 2014.

== Biography ==
Zampetti was born in Rome, Lazio, in 1949. His father Enrico was a librarian and director of the Senate Library. Zampetti graduated in law in 1973 at the Sapienza University of Rome with a thesis on constitutional law. His supervisor was Leopoldo Elia, with whom Zampetti will collaborate after graduation. Zampetti is also the author of various publications and contributions on the legislative process, parliamentary law and the functions of parliamentary bureaucracies.

In 1976, he was employed in the Chamber of Deputies and, after an initial experience in the parliamentary reporting service, in 1979 he was appointed secretary of the Education and Arts Commission. From 1982 to 1990 he was secretary of the Constitutional Affairs Commission. From 1990 to 1991 he held the position of head of the institutional research and documentation office. From 1991 to 1994, he was the head of the General Secretariat's Office for Administrative Control. Subsequently, after a period at the direction of the legislative planning and coordination office, in September 1995, he was appointed head of the assembly service.

On 11 November 1999, he was appointed General Secretary of the Chamber of Deputies, collaborating with five different house presidents: Luciano Violante, Pier Ferdinando Casini, Fausto Bertinotti, Gianfranco Fini and Laura Boldrini. As secretary general, starting in 2000, he promoted the reorganization of the administrative structures of the Chamber, seeking to integrate various structures and to create opportunities for cooperation with the institutions and citizens.

In December 2014, he left his post as general secretary of the Chamber of Deputies having reached the age of 65.

On 16 February 2015, Zampetti was chosen by the President of the Republic Sergio Mattarella as General Secretary of the presidency of the Republic, replacing Donato Marra. On 3 February 2022, following Mattarella's re-election, he was re-confirmed.

Government offices
Preceded by Donato Marra	Secretary General of the President of Italy; 2015–present	Incumbent
