= Franco Modugno =

Italian judge

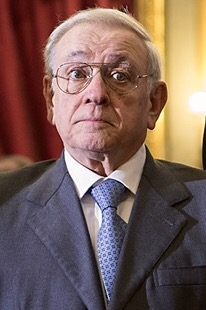

Judge of the Constitutional Court of Italy
- In office 21 December 2015 – 21 December 2024
- Appointed by: Italian Parliament

Personal details
- Born: 3 May 1938 (age 88) Rome, Italy
- Education: Sapienza University of Rome

Franco Modugno (born 3 May 1938) is an Italian judge and former law professor at the Sapienza University of Rome. He has been Judge of the Constitutional Court of Italy from 21 December 2015 to 21 December 2024.

== Career ==
Modugno was born in Rome on 3 May 1938. He obtained a degree in Jurisprudence from the Sapienza University of Rome in 1961. Six years later Modugno started as lecturer of constitutional law at the University of Teramo. He held similar positions at the University of Macerata from 1972 to 1973 and the University of Salerno from 1973 to 1975. In 1975 he started as a professor of Public Law at the Sapienza University and later also held a chair in constitutional law.

On 25 November, the Italian Parliament failed to elect three candidates to the Constitutional Court; Modugno obtained 140 votes, primarily coming from the Five Star Movement. Modugno was elected to the Constitutional Court by the Parliament on 16 December 2015, and he was sworn in five days later.

Modugno was made Knight in the Order of Merit of the Italian Republic on 27 December 1993. On 2 June 2013 he was made Commander in the same Order.
