= 2013 Five Star Movement presidential primary election =

Italian political primary

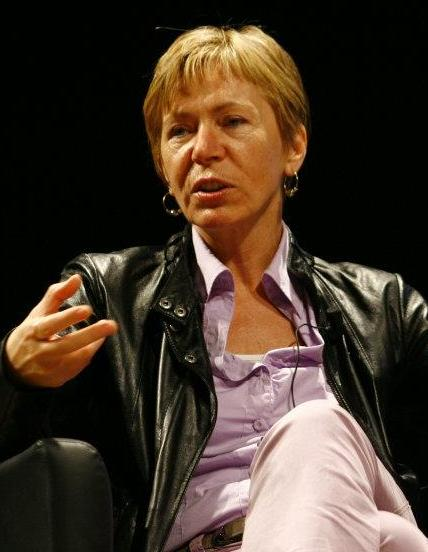

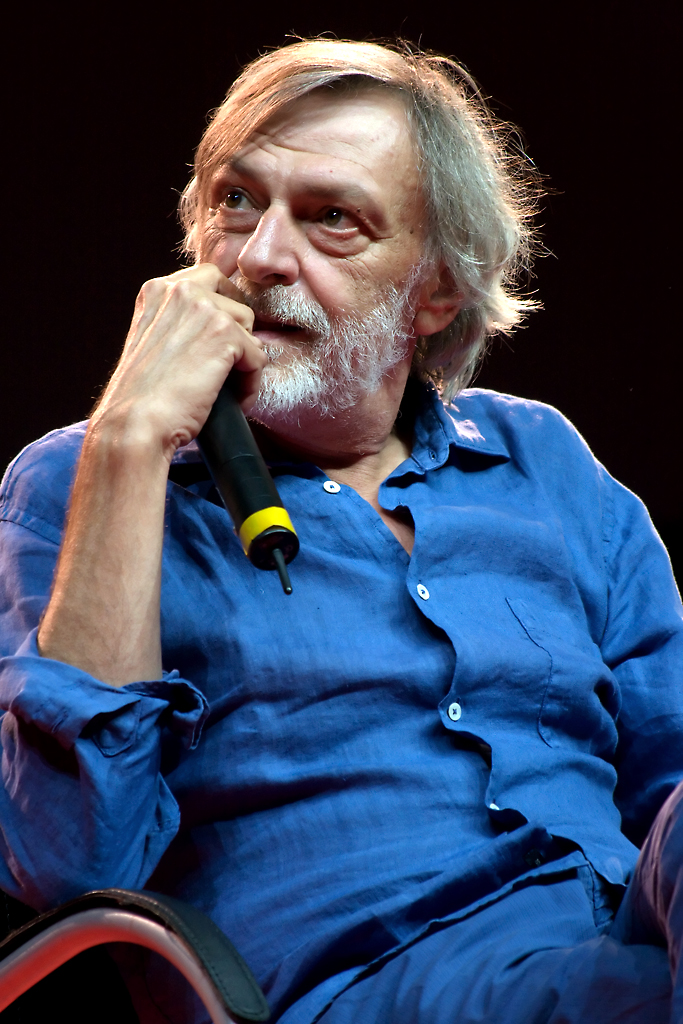

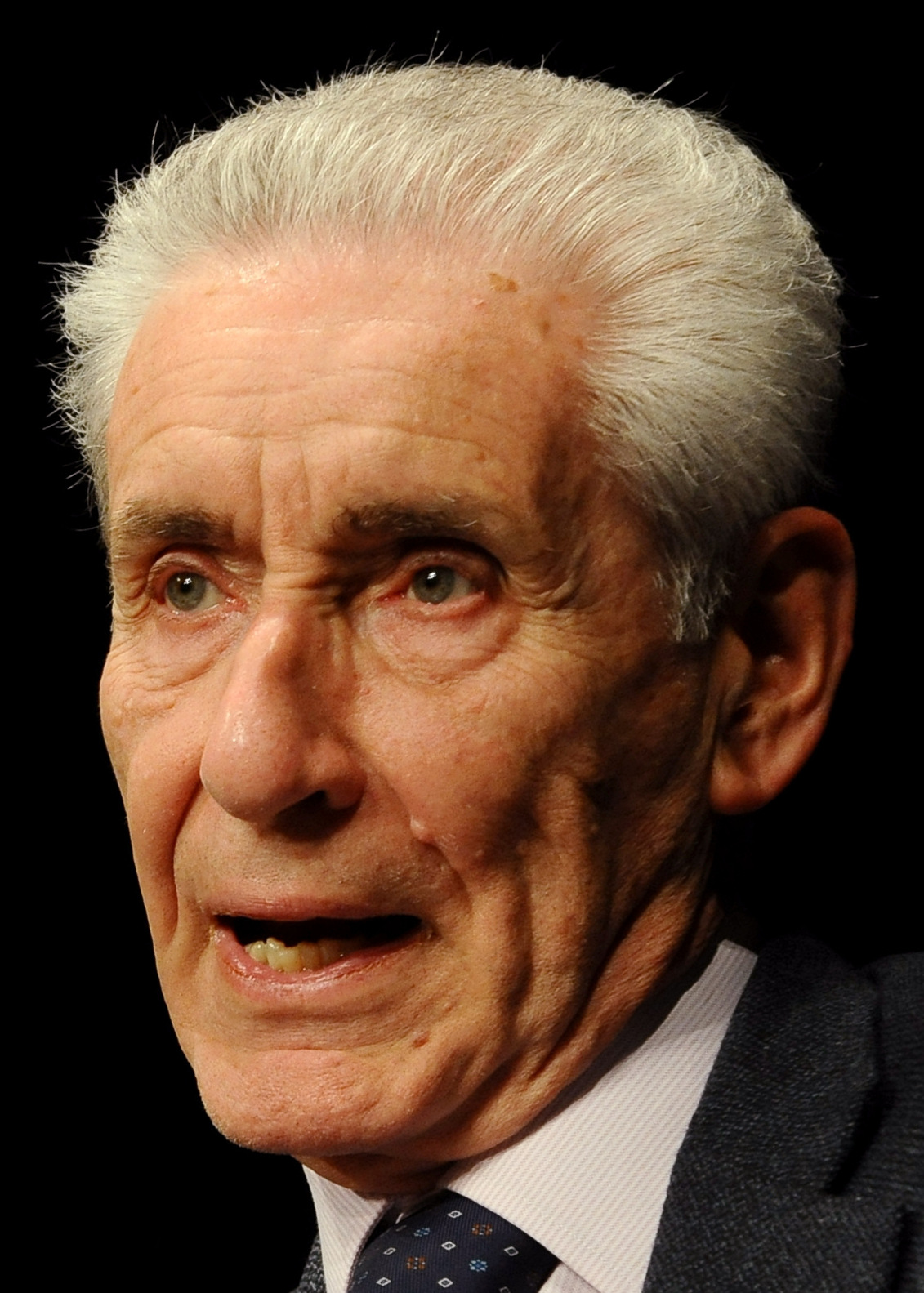
Candidate	Milena Gabanelli (declined to run)	Gino Strada (declined to run)	Stefano Rodotà
Party	Independent	Independent	Independent
Members' vote	5,796	4,938	4,667
Percentage	20.3%	17.3%	16.4%

The 2013 Five Star Movement presidential primary election was held online in April 2013 to choose the Five Star Movement candidate in the 2013 Italian presidential election.

After the two top-runners, journalist Milena Gabanelli and human rights activist Gino Strada, turned down the offer to run for president, former member of the Italian Parliament Stefano Rodotà, who had come in third, was chosen as the official candidate of the party.

Rodotà ended up losing the presidential election to Giorgio Napolitano, coming in second on the sixth ballot.

== Candidates ==
Portrait	Name	Offices held	Profession
	Milena Gabanelli (age 60)	N/A	Journalist
	Gino Strada (1948–2021)	N/A	Doctor of medicine
	Stefano Rodotà (1933–2017)	Vice President of the Chamber of Deputies (1992) Other positions: Member of the Chamber of Deputies (1979–1994); President of the Democrats of the Left (1991–1992); President of the Italian Data Protection Authority (1997–2005)	Jurist
	Gustavo Zagrebelsky (born 1943)	President of the Constitutional Court (2004) Other positions: Judge of the Constitutional Court (1995–2004)	Jurist
	Ferdinando Imposimato (1936–2018)	Member of the Senate (1987 – 1992; 1994 –1996) Other positions: Member of the Chamber of Deputies (1992–1994)	Magistrate
	Emma Bonino (1948–2026)	Ministers of Foreign Affairs (2013–2014) Other positions: Member of the Senate (2008 – 2013; 2018 – 2022); Vice president of the Senate (2008–2013); Minister of International Trade and European Affairs (2006–2008); European Commissioner for Health and Consumer Protection (1995–1999); Member of the European Parliament (1976–1978); Member of the Chamber of Deputies (1976–1978)	Career politician
ù	Gian Carlo Caselli (born 1939)	N/A	Magistrate
	Dario Fo (1926–2016)	N/A	Movie director

== Results ==
Candidate	Party	Votes	%	Notes
Milena Gabanelli	Independent	5,796	20.32%	Declined to run
Gino Strada	Independent	4,938	17.32%	Declined to run
Stefano Rodotà	Independent	4,667	16.37%	N/A
Gustavo Zagrebelsky	Independent	4,355	15.27%	N/A
Ferdinando Imposimato	Independent	2,476	8.68%	N/A
Emma Bonino	More Europe	2,200	7.71%	N/A
Gian Carlo Caselli	Independent	1,761	6.18%	N/A
Romano Prodi	Democratic Party	1,394	4.89%	N/A
Dario Fo	Independent	941	3.30%	N/A
Total		28,518	100	N/A

== Related pages ==
2015 Five Star Movement presidential primary election
