= 2015 Five Star Movement presidential primary election =

Italian political primary

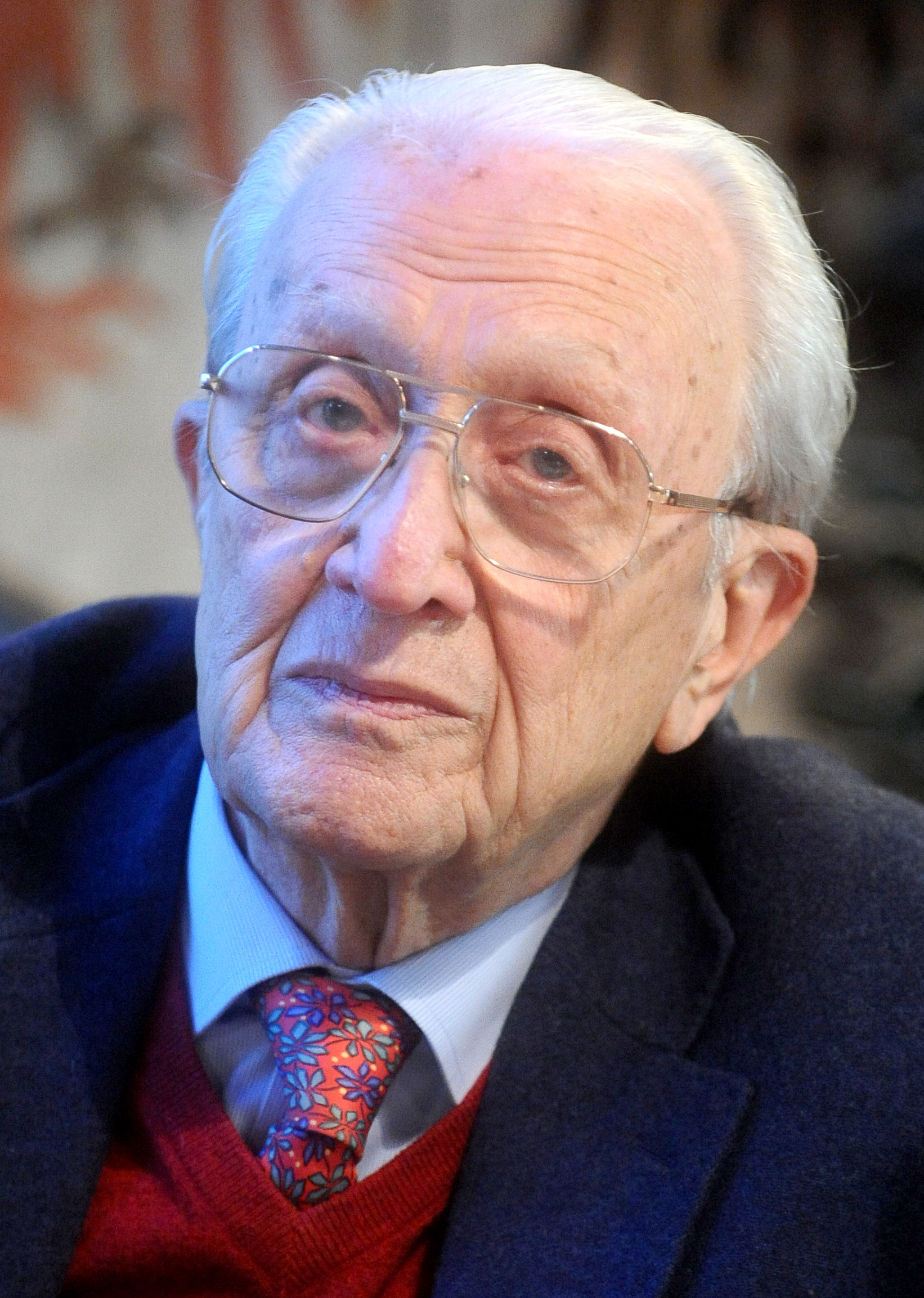

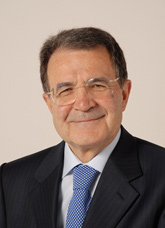
Candidate	Ferdinando Imposimato	Romano Prodi
Party	Independent	Democratic Party
Members' vote	16,635	10,288
Percentage	33.4%	21.3%

The 2015 Five Star Movement presidential primary election was held online in January 2015 to determine the Five Star Movement candidate in the 2015 Italian presidential election.

Ferdinando Imposimato, former Member of the Parliament and honorary president of Supreme Court of Cassation, won the primary with a plurality of the vote, but ultimately lost the presidential election to Sergio Mattarella, coming in second on the fourth ballot.

== Candidates ==
Portrait	Name	Office(s) held	Profession
	Ferdinando Imposimato (1936–2018)	Member of the Senate (1987 – 1992; 1994 –1996) Other positions: Member of the Chamber of Deputies (1992–1994)	Magistrate
	Romano Prodi (born 1939)	President of the European Commission (1999–2004) Other offices: President of the Democratic Party (2007–2009); Prime Minister of Italy (1996 – 1998; 2006 – 2008); Member of the Chamber of Deputies (1996–1999; 2006 – 2008); Minister of Industry, Commerce and Crafts (1978–1979)	University professor
	Nino Di Matteo (born 1961)	Member of the High Council of the Judiciary (2019 – present)	Magistrate
	Pierluigi Bersani (born 1951)	Secretary of the Democratic Party (Italy) (2009–2013) Other offices: Minister of Economic Development (2006–2008); Minister of Industry, Commerce and Crafts (1996–1999); President of Emilia-Romagna (1996–1998; 2006–2008); Member of the Chamber of Deputies (2006–2022); Member of the European Parliament (2004–2006)	Career politician
	Gustavo Zagrebelsky (born 1943)	President of the Constitutional Court (2004) Other positions: Judge of the Constitutional Court (1995–2004)	Jurist
	Raffaele Cantone (born 1963)	President of the National Anticorruption Authority (2014–2019)	Magistrate
	Elio Lannutti (born 1948)	Member of the Senate (2008–2013; 2018–2022)	Journalist
	Salvatore Settis (born 1941)	N/A	Rector
	Paolo Maddalena (born 1936)	Vice President of the Constitutional Court of Italy (2010–2011) Other offices Judge of the Constitutional Court of Italy (2002–2011)	Magistrate

== Results ==
Candidate	Party	Votes	%
Ferdinando Imposimato	Independent	16,635	34.45%
Romano Prodi	Democratic Party	10,288	21.31%
Nino Di Matteo	Independent	6,693	13.86%
Pierluigi Bersani	Democratic Party	5,787	11.99%
Gustavo Zagrebelsky	Independent	5,547	11.49%
Raffaele Cantone	Independent	3,341	6.92%
Elio Lannutti	Five Star Movement	1,528	3.16%
Salvatore Settis	Independent	1,517	3.14%
Paolo Maddalena	Independent	392	0.81%
Total		48,282	100.00

== See also ==
- 2013 Five Star Movement presidential primary election
