= 2013 Italian presidential election =

Election of the President of the Italian Republic

- 18–20 April 2013

1,007 voters (315 Senators, 4 Senators for life, 630 Deputies and 58 regional representatives) 672 (1st–3rd ballots) or 504 (4th ballot onwards) votes needed to win
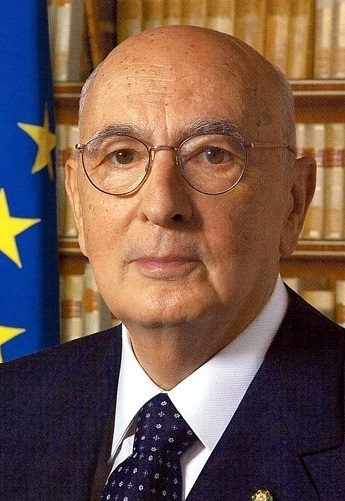

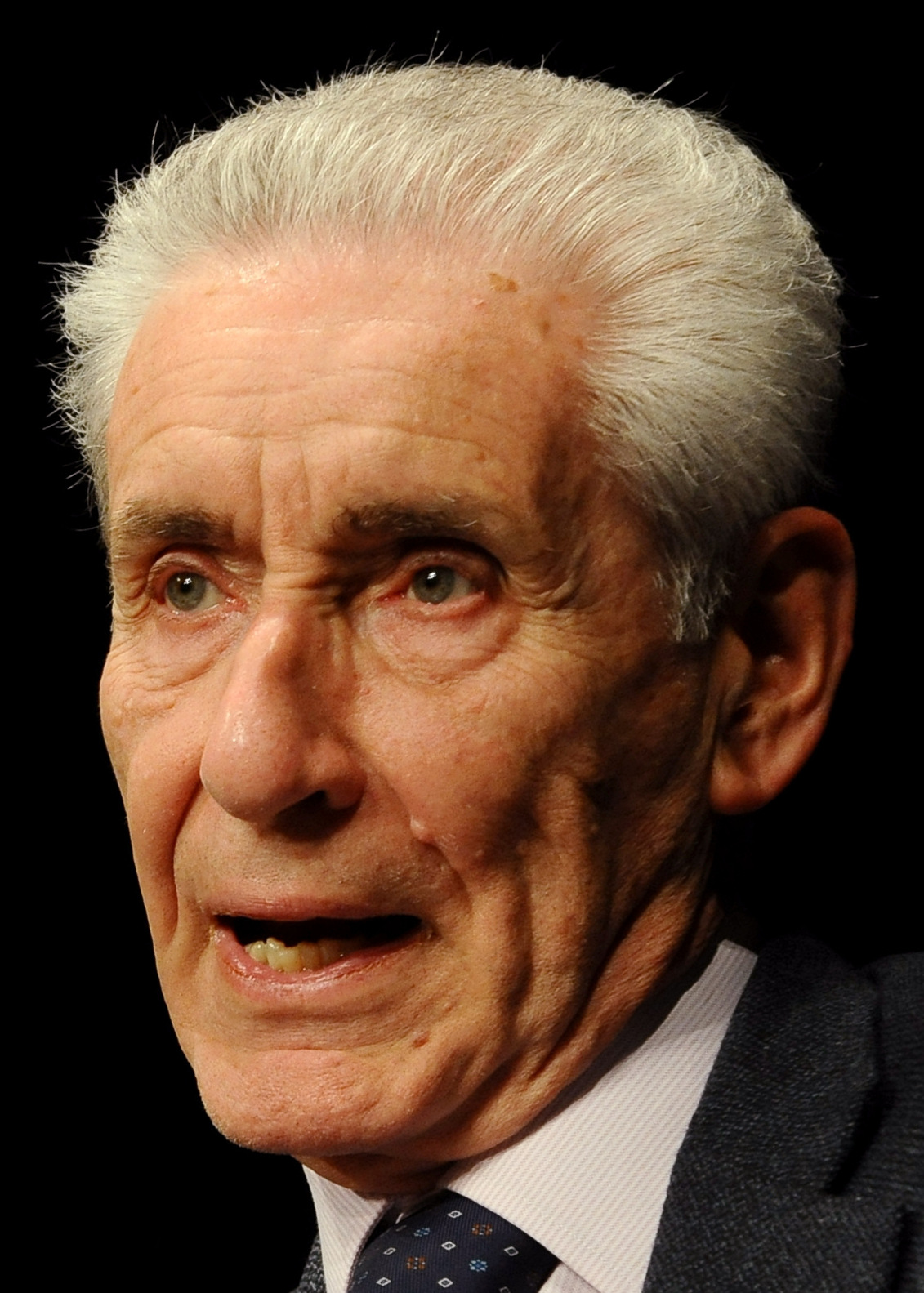
Nominee	Giorgio Napolitano	Stefano Rodotà
Party	Independent	Independent
Electoral vote	738	217
Percentage	73.3%	21.5%
- Result on the sixth ballot (20 April 2013) Napolitano 738 Rodotà 217; Others 20 Invalids, blanks, abstentions 32
President before election
Giorgio Napolitano
Independent
Elected President
Giorgio Napolitano
Independent

The 2013 Italian presidential election was held in Italy on 18–20 April 2013. The result was the re-election of Giorgio Napolitano, the first time a president had been elected for a second term.

Only members of Parliament and regional delegates were entitled to vote, most of these electors having been elected in the 2013 general election. As head of state of the Italian Republic, the president has a role of representation of national unity and guarantees that Italian politics comply with the Italian Constitution, in the framework of a parliamentary system.

== Procedure ==
In accordance with the Italian Constitution, the election was held in the form of a secret ballot, with the Senators, the Deputies and 58 regional representatives entitled to vote. The election was held in the Palazzo Montecitorio, home of the Chamber of Deputies, with the capacity of the building expanded for the purpose. The first three ballots required a two-thirds majority of the 1,007 voters in order to elect a president, or 672 votes. Starting from the fourth ballot, an absolute majority was required for candidates to be elected, or 504 votes. The presidential mandate lasts seven years. The term of the incumbent president, Giorgio Napolitano, was due to end on 15 May 2013.

The election was presided over by the President of the Chamber of Deputies Laura Boldrini, who proceeded to the public counting of the votes, and by the President of the Senate Pietro Grasso.

== Proposed candidates ==
These candidates were officially proposed as president and voted in at least one ballot, by parties, coalitions or parliamentary groups which took part in the election.

=== Elected president ===
Portrait	Name	Party	Office(s) held	Region of birth	Profession(s)	Supporting party or coalition	Ref.
Giorgio Napolitano	Giorgio Napolitano (1925–2023)	Independent	President of Italy (2006–2015) Other offices: Minister of the Interior (1996–1998); President of the Chamber of Deputies (1992–1994); Senator for life (2005–2006); Member of the European Parliament (1989–1992; 1999–2004); Member of the Chamber of Deputies (1953–1963; 1968–1996)	Campania	Jurist	PD • PdL; SC • LN • UdC	

=== Other candidates ===
Portrait	Name	Party	Office(s) held	Region of birth	Profession(s)	Supporting party or coalition	Ref.
Stefano Rodotà	Stefano Rodotà (1933–2017)	Independent	Vice President of the Chamber of Deputies (1992) Other offices: President of the Democratic Party of the Left (1991–1992); President of the Authority for the Protection of Personal Data (1997–2005); Member of the Chamber of Deputies (1979-1992)	Calabria	Jurist	M5S • SEL	

=== Withdrawn candidates ===
Portrait	Name	Party	Office(s) held	Region of birth	Profession(s)	Supporting party or coalition	Ref.
Annamaria Cancellieri	Annamaria Cancellieri (born 1943)	Independent	Minister of the Interior (2011–2013)	Lazio	Civil servant	SC	
	Franco Marini (1933–2021)	Democratic Party	President of the Senate (2006–2008) Other offices: Member of the Senate (2006–2013); Member of the Chamber of Deputies (1992–2006); Minister of Labour and Social Security (1991–1992); Secretary of the Italian People's Party (1997–1999); Secretary General of the Italian Confederation of Workers' Trade Unions (1985–1991)	Abruzzo	Trade unionist	PD • PdL • LN	
Romano Prodi	Romano Prodi (born 1939)	Democratic Party	President of the European Commission (1999–2004) Other offices: President of the Democratic Party (2007–2009); Prime Minister of Italy (1996–1998; 2006–2008); Member of the Chamber of Deputies (1996–1999; 2006–2008); Minister of Industry, Commerce and Crafts (1978–1979)	Emilia-Romagna	University professor	PD • SEL	

== Chronology ==
On 16 April 2013, the Five Star Movement (M5S), following an online vote from party members, announced its support for investigative journalist Milena Gabanelli, and the party's leader Beppe Grillo indicated that the party might be willing to form a coalition government with the centre-left coalition if she were elected president with the coalition's support. On 17 April, after Gabanelli and Gino Strada withdrew from consideration, the M5S announced its support for Stefano Rodotà, a former President of the Data Protection Authority, member of the Chamber of Deputies, Member of the European Parliament, and president of the Democratic Party of the Left (PDS).

On 17 April, Pier Luigi Bersani, leader of the Democratic Party (PD), put forward Franco Marini, a former leader of the Italian Confederation of Workers' Trade Unions (CISL), leader of the Italian People's Party (PPI) and President of the Italian Senate, as his party's candidate for president. Marini was selected having received the support of centre-right parties, notably The People of Freedom (PdL), Civic Choice (SC), Lega Nord (LN) and the Union of the Centre (UdC). However, Matteo Renzi, mayor of Florence and leader of a party minority, several Democratic Party lawmakers and Left Ecology Freedom (SEL) stated that they would not support Marini.

On 18 April, Marini received just 521 votes in the first ballot, short of the 672 needed, as more than 200 centre-left delegates rebelled. In the run-up of the second ballot Marini's candidacy was retired. The first two rounds' inconclusive results were interpreted as showing turmoil within the centre-left. As results of apparent jokes by electors, a number of implausible candidates, such as football manager Roberto Mancini and porn star Rocco Siffredi, received individual votes.

On 19 April, the PD and SEL selected Romano Prodi, a former Prime Minister and President of the European Commission, to be their candidate in the fourth ballot. Despite the fact that his candidacy had received unanimous support among the two parties' delegates, Prodi obtained only 395 votes in the fourth ballot as more than 100 centre-left electors did not vote for him. After the vote, Bersani announced his resignation from party secretary and Prodi pulled out of the race.

On 20 April, incumbent President Giorgio Napolitano, holder of the post since 2006, agreed to run for another term in an attempt to break the parliamentary deadlock with the aim of safeguarding the continuity of the country's institutions.

== Parties' voters ==
The number of seats per party was as follows:

Composition of the electoral college
Party	Members (total)	Members		Share
Party	Members (total)	MPs (Chamber and Senate)	Regional delegates	Share
Democratic Party (PD)	423	399	24	42.0%
The People of Freedom (PdL)	211	188	23	20.9%
Five Star Movement (M5S)	163	163	0	16.2%
Civic Choice/Union of the Centre (SC/UdC)	71	69	2	7.0%
Left Ecology Freedom (SEL)	44	43	1	4.4%
Lega Nord (LN)	38	34	4	3.8%
Others	57	52	5	5.7%
Total	1,007	949	58	100.0%

== Results ==
In the first three ballots the required majority was 672 votes. Further ballots require a simple majority of electors, in this case 504 votes.

Berlusconi and his coalition refused to support the PD's Fourth Round choice of Romano Prodi, claiming he was unacceptable as a compromise candidate. As a result, leaders from all political parties except for Beppe Grillo turned to Napolitano and held discussions with him in order to convince him to run again. Even though he had openly stated his refusal to consider running again in an interview a week before, Napolitano reluctantly agreed, and the party leaders subsequently urged electors to back him as a show of unity.

Napolitano was comfortably re-elected, having garnered the support of centre-left leader Pier Luigi Bersani, former Prime Minister and centre-right leader Silvio Berlusconi, and interim PM and centrist Mario Monti.

=== First ballot ===
Candidate	Party	Votes
Franco Marini	Democratic Party	521
Stefano Rodotà	Independent	240
Sergio Chiamparino	Democratic Party	41
Romano Prodi	Democratic Party	14
Emma Bonino	Italian Radicals	13
Massimo D'Alema	Democratic Party	12
Giorgio Napolitano	Independent	10
Anna Finocchiaro	Democratic Party	7
Annamaria Cancellieri	Independent	2
Mario Monti	Civic Choice	2
Others		18
Blank votes		104
Invalid votes		15

=== Second ballot ===
Candidate	Party	Votes
Stefano Rodotà	Independent	230
Sergio Chiamparino	Democratic Party	90
Massimo D'Alema	Democratic Party	38
Franco Marini	Democratic Party	15
Alessandra Mussolini	The People of Freedom	15
Romano Prodi	Democratic Party	13
Emma Bonino	Italian Radicals	10
Sergio Di Caprio	Independent	9
Cosimo Sibilia	The People of Freedom	7
Rosy Bindi	Democratic Party	6
Paola Severino	Independent	5
Silvio Berlusconi	The People of Freedom	4
Pier Luigi Bersani	Democratic Party	4
Anna Finocchiaro	Democratic Party	4
Giorgio Napolitano	Independent	4
Ricardo Antonio Merlo	MAIE	3
Pierluigi Castagnetti	Democratic Party	2
Michele Cucuzza	Independent	2
Arnaldo Forlani	Independent	2
Pietro Grasso	Democratic Party	2
Grazia Maniscalco	Independent	2
Antonio Palmieri	The People of Freedom	2
Claudio Sabelli Fioretti	Independent	2
Daniela Santanchè	The People of Freedom	2
Santo Versace	Act to Stop the Decline	2
Others		41
Blank votes		418
Invalid votes		14

=== Third ballot ===
Candidate	Party	Votes
Stefano Rodotà	Independent	250
Massimo D'Alema	Democratic Party	34
Romano Prodi	Democratic Party	22
Giorgio Napolitano	Independent	12
Annamaria Cancellieri	Independent	9
Claudio Sabelli Fioretti	Independent	8
Sergio Di Caprio	Independent	7
Franco Marini	Democratic Party	6
Alessandra Mussolini	The People of Freedom	5
Antonio Palmieri	The People of Freedom	5
Emma Bonino	Italian Radicals	4
Sergio Chiamparino	Democratic Party	4
Ricardo Antonio Merlo	MAIE	3
Ilaria Borletti Buitoni	Civic Choice	3
Gianroberto Casaleggio	Five Star Movement	3
Fabrizio Cicchitto	The People of Freedom	3
Gherardo Colombo	Independent	2
Ermanno Leo	Independent	2
Pierluigi Castagnetti	Democratic Party	2
Roberto Di Giovan Paolo	Democratic Party	2
Antonio Martino	The People of Freedom	2
Nicolò Pollari	Independent	2
Others		44
Blank votes		465
Invalid votes		47

=== Fourth ballot ===
Candidate	Party	Votes
Romano Prodi	Democratic Party	395
Stefano Rodotà	Independent	213
Annamaria Cancellieri	Independent	78
Massimo D'Alema	Democratic Party	15
Franco Marini	Democratic Party	3
Giorgio Napolitano	Independent	2
Others		7
Blank votes		15
Invalid votes		4

=== Fifth ballot ===
Candidate	Party	Votes
Stefano Rodotà	Independent	210
Giorgio Napolitano	Independent	20
Rosario Monteleone	Independent	15
Emma Bonino	Italian Radicals	9
Claudio Zin	MAIE	4
Annamaria Cancellieri	Independent	2
Massimo D'Alema	Democratic Party	2
Franco Marini	Democratic Party	2
Others		14
Blank votes		445
Invalid votes		17

=== Sixth ballot ===
Candidate	Party	Votes
Giorgio Napolitano	Independent	738
Stefano Rodotà	Independent	217
Sergio Di Caprio	Independent	8
Massimo D'Alema	Democratic Party	4
Others		6
Blank votes		10
Invalid votes		12

== Reactions ==
After the election results were announced, demonstrations took place outside Palazzo Montecitorio against the re-election of Napolitano. A sizable number of protesters were supporters of the Five Star Movement led by Beppe Grillo. Grillo himself condemned Napolitano's re-election, claiming this was a "coup d'état".

Pier Luigi Bersani promised to resign as leader of the PD in response to the lack of support within his coalition for Romano Prodi, the party's preference for president on the fourth ballot. Following his resignation, former trade union leader Guglielmo Epifani was elected in his place on 11 May 2013.
