= 2015 Italian presidential election =

Election of the President of the Italian Republic

- 29–31 January 2015

1,009 voters (321 senators, 630 deputies and 58 regional delegates) 673 (1st–3rd ballots) or 505 (4th ballot onwards) votes needed to win
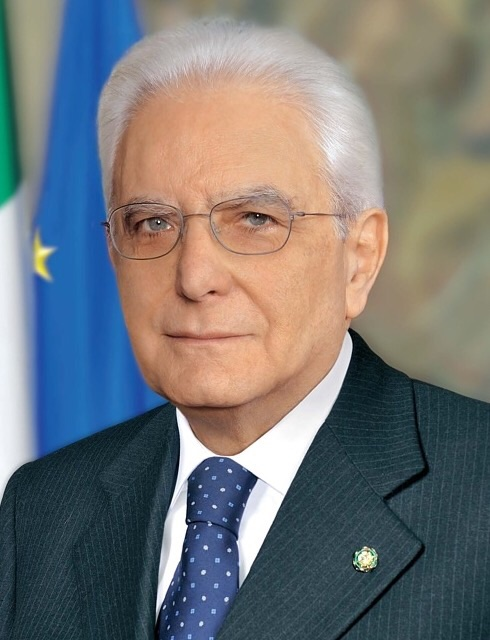

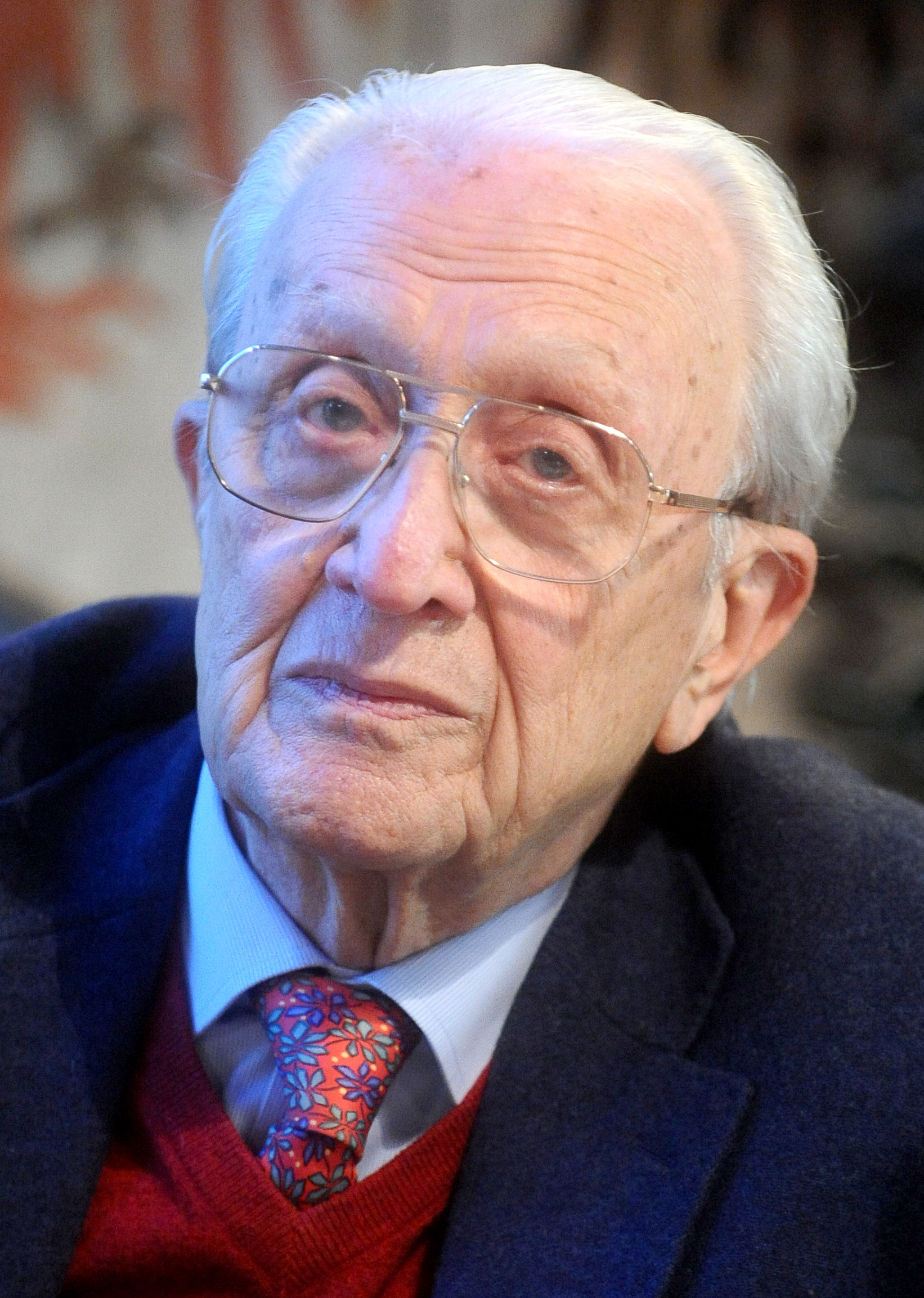
Nominee	Sergio Mattarella	Ferdinando Imposimato
Party	Independent	Independent
Electoral vote	665	127
Percentage	65.91%	12.58%
- Result on the fourth ballot (31 January 2015) Mattarella 665 Others 212 Invalids, blanks, abstentions 132
President before election
Giorgio Napolitano
Independent
Elected President
Sergio Mattarella
Independent

The 2015 Italian presidential election was held on 29–31 January, following the resignation of President Giorgio Napolitano on 14 January 2015. The office was held at the time of the election by Senate President Pietro Grasso in an acting capacity. Only members of Italian Parliament and regional delegates are entitled to vote. As head of state of the Italian Republic, the President has a role of representation of national unity and guarantees that Italian politics comply with the Italian Constitution, in the framework of a parliamentary system.

On 31 January, at the fourth round of voting, the Judge of the Constitutional Court and former Deputy Prime Minister Sergio Mattarella was elected President of the Italian Republic with 665 votes out of 1,009.

== Procedure ==
In accordance with the Italian Constitution, the election is held in the form of a secret ballot, with the Senators, the Deputies and 58 regional representatives entitled to vote. The election is held in the Palazzo Montecitorio, home of the Chamber of Deputies, with the capacity of the assembly room expanded for the purpose. The first three ballots require a two-thirds majority of the 1,009 voters in order to elect a President, or 673 votes. Starting from the fourth ballot, an absolute majority is required for candidates to be elected, or 505 votes. The presidential mandate lasts seven years.

The election was presided over by the President of the Chamber of Deputies Laura Boldrini, who proceeded to the public counting of the votes, and by the Acting President of the Senate Valeria Fedeli, instead of President Pietro Grasso who was serving as Acting President of the Republic since 14 January.

== Electoral college ==
Electors per parliamentary group (including the regional delegates) were divided as follows:

Composition of the electoral college
Party	Members (total)	Members		Share
Party	Members (total)	MPs (Chamber and Senate)	Regional delegates	Share
Democratic Party (PD)	445	415	30	44.1%
Forza Italia (FI)	143	130	13	14.1%
Five Star Movement (M5S)	129	128	1	12.8%
Popular Area (NCD/UdC)	74	70	4	7.3%
Lega Nord (LN)	38	35	3	3.8%
Left Ecology Freedom (SEL)	34	33	1	3.4%
Civic Choice (SC)	32	32	0	3.2%
Others	114	108	6	11.3%
Total	1,009	951	58	100.0%

== Proposed candidates ==
These candidates were officially proposed as president and voted in at least one ballot, by parties, coalitions or parliamentary groups which took part in the election.

=== Elected president ===
Portrait	Name	Party	Office(s) held	Region of birth	Profession(s)	Supporting party or coalition	Ref.
Sergio Mattarella	Sergio Mattarella (born 1941)	Independent	Judge of the Constitutional Court (2011–2015) Other offices: Minister of Defence (1999–2001); Deputy Prime Minister of Italy (1998–1999); Minister of Public Education (1989–1990); Minister for Parliamentary Relations (1987–1989); Member of the Chamber of Deputies (1983–2008)	Sicily	Jurist	PD • NCD; SC • CD • DemoS	

=== Other candidates ===
Portrait	Name	Party	Office(s) held	Region of birth	Profession(s)	Supporting party or coalition	Ref.
Luciana Castellina	Luciana Castellina (born 1929)	Left Ecology Freedom	Member of the European Parliament (1979–1999) Other offices: Member of the Chamber of Deputies (1976–1979; 1983–1984; 1992)	Lazio	Journalist	SEL	
Vittorio Feltri	Vittorio Feltri (born 1943)	Independent	None	Lombardy	Journalist	Lega • FdI	
Ferdinando Imposimato	Ferdinando Imposimato (1936–2018)	Independent	Member of the Senate (1987–1992; 1994–1996) Other offices: Member of the Chamber of Deputies (1992–1994)	Campania	Magistrate	M5S	

== Results ==
=== First ballot (29 January) ===
Candidate	Party	Votes
Ferdinando Imposimato	Independent	120
Vittorio Feltri	Independent	49
Luciana Castellina	Left Ecology Freedom	37
Emma Bonino	Italian Radicals	25
Stefano Rodotà	Independent	23
Gabriele Albertini	New Centre-Right	14
Claudio Sabelli Fioretti	Independent	11
Romano Prodi	Independent	9
Mauro Morelli	Independent	9
Massimo Caleo	Democratic Party	8
Marcello Gualdani	New Centre-Right	6
Pier Luigi Bersani	Democratic Party	5
Sergio Mattarella	Independent	5
Lucio Barani	New Italian Socialist Party	4
Giuseppe Scognamiglio	Independent	4
Agostino Marianetti	Independent	3
Antonio Martino	Forza Italia	3
Ricardo Antonio Merlo	MAIE	3
Ignazio Messina	Italy of Values	3
Paolo Mieli	Independent	3
Giuseppe Pagano	New Centre-Right	3
Antonello Zitelli	Independent	3
Dario Ballini D'Amato	Independent	2
Anna Finocchiaro	Democratic Party	2
Ezio Greggio	Independent	2
Others		48
Blank votes		538
Invalid votes		33

=== Second ballot (30 January) ===
Candidate	Party	Votes
Ferdinando Imposimato	Independent	123
Vittorio Feltri	Independent	51
Luciana Castellina	Left Ecology Freedom	34
Emma Bonino	Italian Radicals	23
Stefano Rodotà	Independent	22
Claudio Sabelli Fioretti	Independent	14
Marcello Gualdani	New Centre-Right	10
Giuseppe Pagano	New Centre-Right	7
Santo Versace	Independent	6
Romano Prodi	Independent	5
Paola Severino	Independent	5
Sergio Mattarella	Independent	4
Antonio Razzi	Forza Italia	4
Gian Carlo Sangalli	Democratic Party	4
Ezio Greggio	Independent	3
Mauro Guerra	Democratic Party	3
Ignazio Messina	Italy of Values	3
Lucio Barani	New Italian Socialist Party	2
Pier Luigi Bersani	Democratic Party	2
Luciano Cimmino	Civic Choice	2
Anna Finocchiaro	Democratic Party	2
Franco Frattini	Independent	2
Agostino Marianetti	Independent	2
Giuseppe Scognamiglio	Independent	2
Others		61
Blank votes		531
Invalid votes		26

=== Third ballot (30 January) ===
Candidate	Party	Votes
Ferdinando Imposimato	Independent	126
Vittorio Feltri	Independent	56
Luciana Castellina	Left Ecology Freedom	33
Emma Bonino	Italian Radicals	23
Stefano Rodotà	Independent	22
Lucio Barani	New Italian Socialist Party	21
Giuseppe Pagano	New Centre-Right	11
Claudio Sabelli Fioretti	Independent	8
Marcello Gualdani	New Centre-Right	7
Mauro Guerra	Democratic Party	5
Francesco Guccini	Independent	4
Luigi Manconi	Democratic Party	5
Sergio Mattarella	Independent	4
Giovanni Malagò	Independent	4
Ignazio Messina	Italy of Values	3
Antonio Palmieri	Forza Italia	3
Angelo Perrino	Independent	3
Romano Prodi	Independent	3
Ernesto Abaterusso	Democratic Party	2
Pier Ferdinando Casini	Union of the Centre	2
Michele Emiliano	Democratic Party	2
Franco Frattini	Independent	2
Ezio Greggio	Independent	2
Luigi Marino	Independent	2
Vincenzo Olita	Independent	2
Antonio Razzi	Forza Italia	2
Pasquale Sollo	Democratic Party	2
Andrea Vecchio	Civic Choice	2
Others		70
Blank votes		513
Invalid votes		27

=== Fourth ballot (31 January) ===
Candidate	Party	Votes
Sergio Mattarella	Independent	665
Ferdinando Imposimato	Independent	127
Vittorio Feltri	Independent	46
Stefano Rodotà	Independent	17
Emma Bonino	Italian Radicals	2
Antonio Martino	Forza Italia	2
Giorgio Napolitano	Independent	2
Romano Prodi	Independent	2
Others		14
Blank votes		105
Invalid votes		13

== See also ==
- 2015 Five Star Movement presidential primary election
