= Sigfrido Ranucci =

Italian journalist (born 1961)

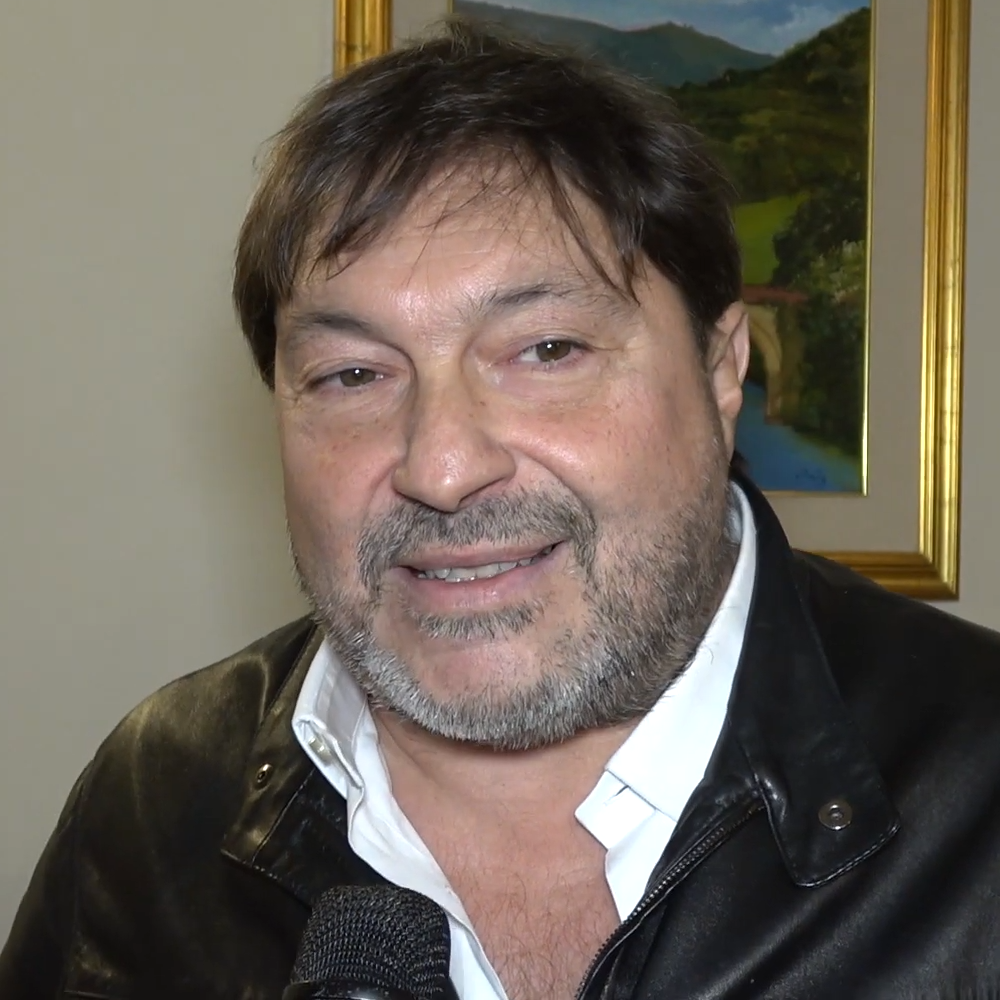
- Born: Sigfrido Ranucci; 24 August 1961 (age 65); Rome, Italy
- Education: Sapienza University of Rome
- Occupation: Journalist
- Height: 1.68 m (5 ft 6 in)
- Children: 3

Sigfrido Ranucci (born 24 August 1961) is an Italian journalist. He is best known for directing the documentary film Fallujah, The Hidden Massacre.

Ranucci hosts since 2017 the well-known Italian investigative TV series Report on public television RAI 3. The political magazine is according to Euronews "one of the few investigative programmes on Italian television and regularly breaks news involving prominent Italian politicians, business leaders and public figure."

In 2006 Ranucci became co-author of the Report, with Milena Gabanelli. In 2009 he published The story: from Ciancimino to Dell'Utri, the State-mafia negotiation newly told by an undercover agent.

Ranucci lives in the Roman suburb of Campo Ascolano close to the Mediterranean coast. In 2024 Ranucci found two bullets in front of his house, apparently left there as a threat. On the night of 16 October 2025, unknown perpetrators bombed Sigfrido Ranucci's car. Residents reported two consecutive, extremely loud explosions. The car was parked in front of Ranucci's house and burned completely. His daughter's car, which was parked next to it, was also destroyed. A Report editor colleague of Ranucci declared, that "the force of the explosion was so strong that it could have been fatal if someone had been passing by at that time". Authorities and the media believe it was a mafia attack.

The trade union Usigrai stated few hours after the attack, that in the month prior to the bombing they had denounced Rai for reducing the airtime available to Report and particularly the climate of hatred and intolerance towards the editorial staff's investigations. "In prime time on Rai1, the second highest office of the state even went so far as to describe Report staff as 'serial slanderers,' without either the presenter or the company distancing themselves. A hate campaign against investigative journalism that must end."

Sigfrido Ranucci is married to Marina and has three children; he is Roman Catholic.
