= Buscemi (disambiguation) =

Buscemi is a town in Sicily, Italy.

Buscemi may also refer to:

- Buscemi (DJ), nickname of the Belgian DJ Dirk Swartenbroekx
- Buscemi (surname), surname

== See also ==
- Buscema
