= Buscemi (surname) =

Buscemi is an Italian surname. Notable people with the surname include:

- Giusy Buscemi (born 1993), Italian actress and model
- Jon Buscemi (born 1975), American fashion designer
- Michael Buscemi (born 1960), American actor
- Ottavia Penna Buscemi (1907–1986), Italian politician
- Steve Buscemi (born 1957), American actor

== See also ==
- Buscemi (disambiguation)
- Buscema
