= Carosi =

Carosi is an Italian surname. Notable people with the surname include:

- Aldo Carosi (born 1951), Italian judge
- Angelo Carosi (born 1964), Italian long-distance runner
- Manuela Carosi (born 1965), Italian swimmer
