= Angelo Buscema =

Italian magistrate

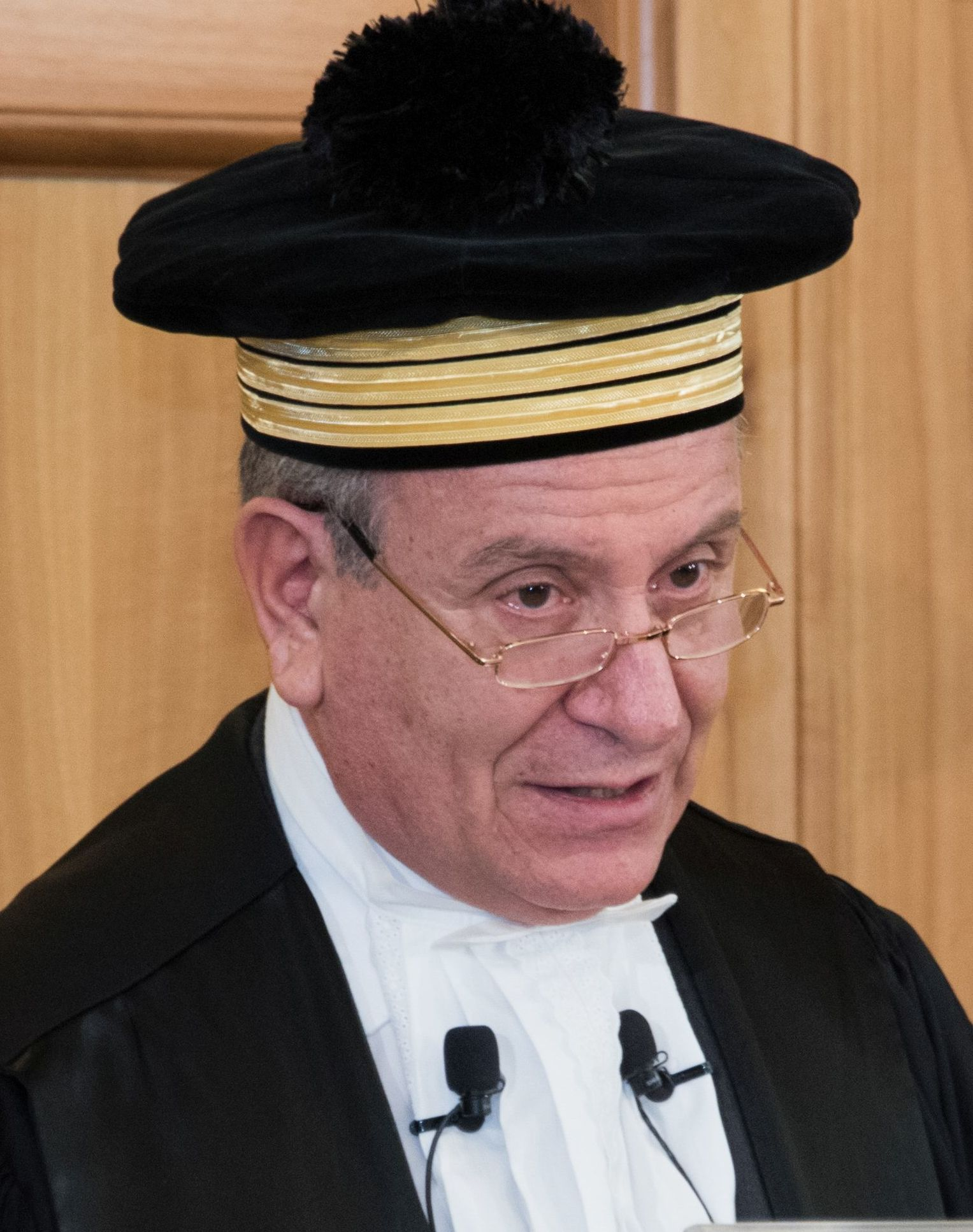

Judge of the Constitutional Court of Italy
- Incumbent
- Assumed office 15 September 2020
- Appointed by: Court of Audit
- Preceded by: Aldo Carosi

President of the Court of Audit
- In office 13 February 2018 – 11 September 2020
- Preceded by: Arturo Martucci di Scarfizzi
- Succeeded by: Guido Carlino

Personal details
- Born: 9 February 1952 (age 74) Rome, Italy
- Party: Independent
- Profession: Magistrate, academic

Angelo Buscema (born 9 February 1952) is an Italian magistrate and academic.

== Biography ==
Son of the Sicilian jurist Salvatore Buscema, Angelo Buscema graduated in law and qualified in 1978 to practice law.

In 1981, with a public competition, he entered the role of the judiciary of the Court of Audit, holding various positions in different areas of the Court. He coordinated the report on public finance for 2014, 2015, 2016, 2017, on the cost of public works in 2016, on the university system in 2017.

He taught at the Higher School of Public Administration of Naples, at the Higher School of Economics and Finance of Milan, at the Second University of Naples and at the University of Cassino. He has been president of the Magistrates' Association of the Court of Audit.

Buscema has been appointed President of the Court of Audit in December 2017 on the proposal of Prime Minister Paolo Gentiloni.

On 12 July 2020, Buscema was elected judge of the Constitutional Court of Italy with 147 votes; he thus replaced the judge Aldo Carosi at the end of his mandate and sworn in on 15 September 2020.

== Honours and awards ==
- Italy: Knight Grand Cross of the Order of Merit of the Italian Republic (2018)

Legal offices
Preceded by Aldo Carosi	Judge of the Constitutional Court of Italy; 2020–present	Incumbent
