= Aldo Carosi =

Italian judge

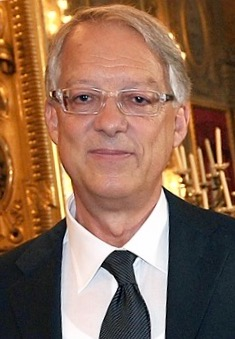
- Aldo Carosi

Vice President of the Constitutional Court of Italy
- In office 24 February 2016 – 13 September 2020

Judge of the Constitutional Court of Italy
- In office 13 September 2011 – 13 September 2020
- Appointed by: Court of Auditors
- Preceded by: Paolo Maddalena
- Succeeded by: Angelo Buscema

Personal details
- Born: 30 June 1951 (age 74) Viterbo, Italy

Aldo Carosi (born 30 June 1951) is an Italian judge. He has been a Judge of the Constitutional Court of Italy since 13 September 2011 and has served as one of its Vice Presidents since 24 February 2016.

== Career ==
Carosi was born in Viterbo. He was a judge on the Court of Auditors before being appointed to the Constitutional Court by the Court of Auditors on 17 July 2011. He was sworn in on 13 September 2011. When Paolo Grossi became President of the Court on 24 February 2016, he named Carosi Vice President. He was confirmed in this position by President Giorgio Lattanzi on 8 March 2018 and by President Marta Cartabia on 11 December 2019.

Carosi was made Knight Grand Cross in the Order of Merit of the Italian Republic on 24 October 2011.
