= Paolo Barnard =

Italian journalist and filmmaker

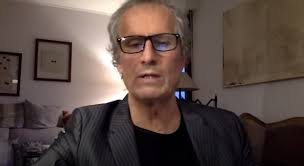
Paolo Barnard

Paolo Rossi-Barnard (born 2 January 1958) is an Italian journalist and documentary maker.

== Biography ==
Born in Bologna, Italy, he began his media career at RAI, for the Italian public television program Samarcanda, after his bachelor's degree in psychology. He later worked for the popular program Report for Rai 3, then moved to Rai Educational. He was correspondent for some main Italian newspapers such as la La Stampa, il manifesto, Corriere della Sera, Il Mattino, and La Repubblica. As an author he has written books on terrorism in the Middle East conflicts and the health system in Italy.

In 2011, Barnard was concerned with monetary fundamentals of the then unfolding economic crisis, especially in Italy. His opinions, published on Barnard's website, led to the organization of the first Italian meeting on Modern Money Theory, held on 25–27 February 2012 in Rimini. Since 2013 he has been taking part in the Italian economic and financial TV talk show La Gabbia hosted by Gianluigi Paragone, which aired on Italian TV channel La7.

He is interviewed in the documentary Piigs (2017), dubbed in English by actor Willem Dafoe.
