= National Anti-Corruption Authority (Italy) =

Italian National Anti-Corruption Authority
- Autorità Nazionale AntiCorruzione
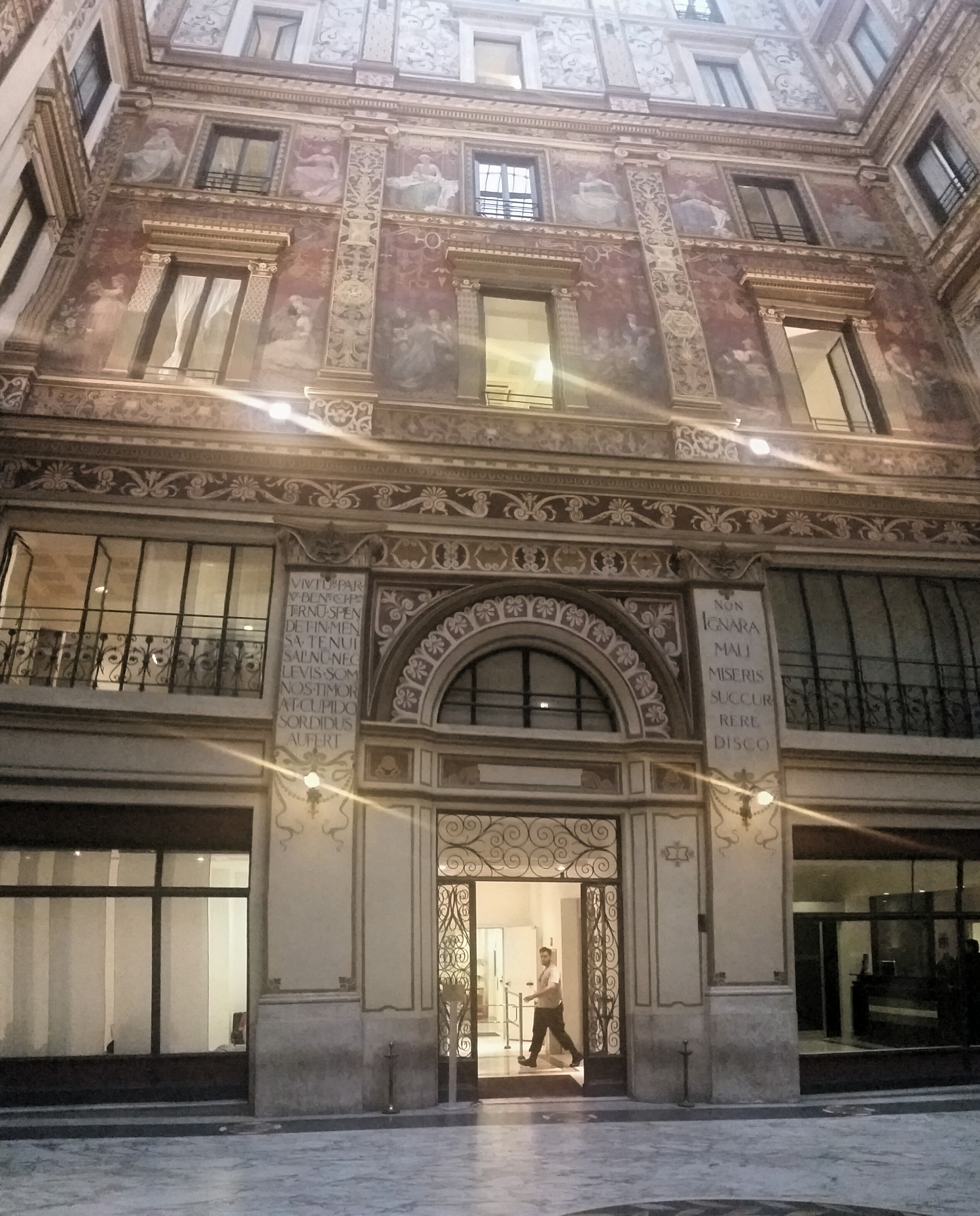
- Headquarters in Rome

Agency overview
- Formed: 2012
- Headquarters: Rome, Italy; 41°54′0″N 12°28′56″E
- Website: anticorruzione.it

The Italian National Anti-Corruption Authority (Italian: Autorità Nazionale AntiCorruzione) (ANAC) is an Italian independent administrative authority tasked with combating corruption in the country, safeguarding the integrity of public administration, combating illegality, preventing corruption, implementing transparency, and supervising public procurement.

== History ==
The ANAC was established by the Italian Anti-Corruption Law No. 190 of 6 November 2012, which gave the Commission for the Evaluation, Transparency and Integrity of Public Administrations (Commissione indipendente per la valutazione, la trasparenza e l'integrità delle amministrazioni pubbliche, CIVIT) National Anti-Corruption Authority function in 2014, pursuant to Decree-Law No. 90 of 24 June 2014, which merged CIVIT with the and incorporates the functions and personnel of the Authority for the Supervision of Public Works, Services and Supplies Contracts (Autorità per la vigilanza sui contratti pubblici di lavori, servizi e forniture, AVCP) that was abolished by the decree law No. 90/2014, converted into law No. 114/2014. This granted it jurisdiction over public procurement while removing its responsibilities concerning the measurement and evaluation of administrative performance, which were transferred to the Department of Public Administration of the Presidency of the Council of Ministers.

As the first president of ANAC, the Renzi government appointed magistrate Raffaele Cantone. On 23 October 2019 Cantone resigned, after announcing his intention to do so on 23 July 2019, due to disagreements with the Conte I Cabinet. The role of acting president was assumed, in accordance with the Authority's regulations, by the senior member by age, Francesco Merloni.

== Duties and function ==
The National Anti-Corruption Authority's function is the prevention of corruption within the Italian public administration, in its various participants and subsidiaries.

The Italian Anti-Corruption Law No. 190 of 6 November 2012 assigned the National Anti-Corruption Authority tasks related to combating corruption in accordance with international obligations undertaken under the Merida Convention. Decree-Law No. 101 of 31 August 2013, converted into Law No. 125 of 30 October 2013, changed its name to the National Anti-Corruption Authority and for the Evaluation and Transparency of Public Administrations.

Its task is the prevention of corruption including through the implementation of increased transparency in all management aspects, as well as through the supervisory activities within the public contracts, in any sector of public administration that potentially could develop corruption phenomena, while avoiding aggravating the procedures with negative effects on citizens and businesses, orienting the behaviors and the activities of civil servants, with interventions in an advisory and regulatory capacity.

Among the Authority's responsibilities, oversight of public procurement plays a prominent role, as it is one of the sectors most exposed to the risk of corruption. This is intended to ensure legality, competition and the prevention of corruption and waste of public resources. With the Italian public contracts code introduced by Legislative Decree No. 36 of 31 March 2023, ANAC lost the power to issue guidelines regulating the public procurement sector. Under the previous public contracts code introduced by Legislative Decree No. 50 of 18 April 2016, ANAC could issue two types of guidelines:

- binding guidelines, which were mandatory for public administrations and whose violation constituted a "violation of law";
- "non-binding" guidelines, from which contracting authorities could depart with justification. The effectiveness of these guidelines, sometimes referred to as "soft law", had been contested by part of the legal scholarship.

The 2023 public contracts code generally abolished this source of law, leaving ANAC the possibility of issuing "general acts" and specific guidelines only in the few cases expressly provided for. The content of the guidelines in force at the time the code was issued was incorporated into the annexes to the code itself.

However, ANAC's supervisory powers have been expanded, expressly extending oversight to the execution of contracts, and its sanctioning powers have also been strengthened, which had previously been excessively limited in relation to the breadth of its responsibilities. The corrective amendment to the public contracts code introduced by Legislative Decree No. 209 of 31 December 2024, which entered into force on 1 January 2025, did not modify ANAC's powers and responsibilities.

=== Digitalization of public contracts and database ===
Through the ANAC database, the Authority participates in the digital transformation of public procurement in Italy (the e-procurement system), which became mandatory on 1 January 2024. The entire life cycle of public contracts, from project planning to final execution, is digitized. Public administrations can acquire resources from the market (supplies, services and works) under the best conditions through a digital process that simplifies procedures, accelerates procurement and makes it easier to monitor, less costly and more effective.

Launched on a large scale in 2001 by Consip, e-procurement applied to all procurement processes will complete the digitalization of procedures that in the past slowed down or sometimes blocked the awarding and execution of works and the purchase of goods and services. It digitalizes all phases of the procurement process: planning, design, execution and access to information and tender documents. A key element of the national system will be interoperability between "certified" platforms.

=== Protection of whistleblowers ===
ANAC plays a key role in the management of reports and the protection of whistleblowers. In particular, this role was strengthened by Legislative Decree No. 24 of 10 March 2023, which introduced significant changes to whistleblowing legislation in Italy, implementing Directive (EU) 2019/1937. In application of this legislation, ANAC issued the resolution of 12 July 2023 No. 311, "Guidelines on the protection of persons who report breaches of European Union law and of persons who report breaches of national legal provisions. Procedures for submitting and managing external reports".

In this area, ANAC performs the following functions:

1. Management of external reports: ANAC is designated as the competent authority to receive and manage reports of wrongdoing, guaranteeing the confidentiality of the identity of reporting persons;
2. Adoption of guidelines governing the matter at secondary level: legislation requires ANAC to issue guidelines for the submission and management of reports, providing operational guidance for both public and private entities. In accordance with this provision, ANAC adopted Resolution No. 311 of 12 July 2023;
3. Monitoring and support activities: ANAC verifies the implementation of whistleblowing legislation and assists organizations in establishing reporting channels;
4. Sanctioning powers: the Authority may impose sanctions on entities that fail to comply with legal obligations, particularly with regard to the failure to establish reporting mechanisms and the failure to protect whistleblowers from retaliation.

=== Advisory role to Parliament and Government ===
Among the functions assigned to ANAC by law is the task of reporting to the Government and Parliament serious phenomena of "non-compliance in the awarding and execution of public contracts", as well as the effectiveness of corruption prevention tools. It advises the Government on possible amendments to existing legislation and presents annual reports to Parliament on its activities in the field of corruption prevention and on the effectiveness of relevant legislation.

To properly perform these functions, the Authority receives information on corruption and "misconduct" in the public sector from public prosecutors, administrative judges, local authorities, other authorities and members of the Council of State.

== Perceived corruption ==
The annual Transparency International report on perceived corruption worldwide, published each year at the end of January, indicates a clear improvement for Italy in recent years. Since the establishment of the National Anti-Corruption Authority in 2014, Italy has improved by 28 positions in the ranking of perceived corruption.

In 2014 Italy was ranked 69th in the global ranking of countries by perceived corruption levels. This position improved over the years, and the 2022 survey (published in January 2023) showed Italy rising to 41st place. Among the countries with the lowest perceived corruption levels, the top positions are held by Denmark, New Zealand and Finland. In 2023 (results published in January 2024), Italy maintained the same score as the previous year (56 points) but dropped one place to 42nd.

== Appointment and term ==
The procedures for appointing the president and the members of the Authority are specified in Article 13, paragraph 3 of Legislative Decree No. 150/2009. In particular, the president and the members are appointed by decree of the President of the Republic “following a resolution of the Council of Ministers, after a favourable opinion by the competent parliamentary committees expressed by a two-thirds majority of their members”.

The president is appointed on the proposal of the Minister for Public Administration and Simplification, in agreement with the Minister of Justice and the Minister of the Interior, while the members are appointed on the proposal of the Minister for Public Administration and Simplification.

Furthermore, “the members are appointed for a period of six years and may not be reappointed”.

== Structure ==
The ANAC established a special unit, EXPO 2015, tasked with controlling and supervising the fairness and transparency of the procedures related to implementation of the Expo 2015 event.

== Funding ==
Like CONSOB, since 2007 the funding of the ANAC has been based on contributions from the market over which ANAC exercises supervision.

== Composition ==
=== National Anti-Corruption Authority ===
Members for the 2020–2026 term (Presidential Decree of 11 September 2020):

- Giuseppe Busia – president
- Laura Valli
- Luca Forteleoni
- Paolo Giacomazzo
- Consuelo Del Balzo

Members for the 2014–2020 term (Presidential Decree of 11 July 2014):

- Raffaele Cantone – president until 23 October 2019
- Francesco Merloni – acting president from 24 October 2019 as the senior member
- Michele Corradino
- Ida Angela Nicotra
- Nicoletta Parisi

=== Arbitration chamber ===
Appointed on 10 February 2015 and composed of university professors of legal subjects:

- Ferruccio Auletta – president
- Ugo Draetta
- Giovanni Licata
- Alberto Massera
- Luca Mezzetti

== Bibliography ==
=== Legislative references ===
- Article 1, paragraphs 65–67 of "Law of 23 December 2005, No. 266 – Provisions for the formation of the annual and multiannual state budget (2006 finance law)"..
- "Legislative Decree of 27 October 2009, No. 150 – Implementation of Law No. 15 of 4 March 2009 on optimizing productivity in public work and the efficiency and transparency of public administrations"..
- "Law of 6 November 2012, No. 190 – Provisions for the prevention and repression of corruption and illegality in public administration"..
- "Legislative Decree of 8 April 2013, No. 39 – Provisions on ineligibility and incompatibility for appointments in public administrations and private entities under public control"..
- "Decree-Law of 24 June 2014, No. 90 – Urgent measures for administrative simplification and transparency and for the efficiency of judicial offices"..

== See also ==
- Corruption in Italy
- Politics of Italy
- Independent Administrative Authority (Italy)
- Authority for the Supervision of Public Works, Services and Supplies Contracts
- CIVIT
- Italian public contracts code
- Conflict of interest
- Pantouflage
