= Report (TV program) =

- Also known as: Professione Reporter (1994–1996)
- Genre: Investigative journalism
- Created by: Milena Gabanelli
- Presented by: Milena Gabanelli (1994–2016); Sigfrido Ranucci (2017–present)
- Country of origin: Italy
- Original language: Italian
- No. of seasons: 26
- No. of episodes: 453

Production
- Production company: RAI

Original release
- Network: Rai 2
- Release: 1994 – 1996
- Network: Rai 3
- Release: 1997 – present

Report is an independent investigative journalistic TV program in Italy, aired on Rai 3, a channel of the Italian State national network RAI for the first time in 1997. The first season were transmitted late in the night, but its increasing success made it possible to move it to prime time. It was inspired by a similar program, Professione Reporter (Profession: Reporter), aired from 1994 to 1996. Each episode is structured to touch a different topic: corporate crime, political corruption, criminal schemes, nutrition, health, science, economy, society or environment.

The author and anchorwoman was, since the beginning, the freelance journalist Milena Gabanelli. The other journalists and episode editors are: Giovanna Boursier, Michele Buono, Giovanna Corsetti, Giorgio Fornoni, Sabrina Giannini, Bernardo Iovene, Giuliano Marrucci, Paolo Mondani, Piero Riccardi e Stefania Rimini. Sigfrido Ranucci co-authored the show for ten years and in March 2017 he became Milena Gabanelli's successor. Chiara Baldassari was also part of the Report team until her death in 2005. Paolo Barnard, author of some of the most critical episodes about globalisation, Israel and economical organisations, decided to leave Report after internal disputes.

In 2016, the program won the Television Direction Award for Best Program of the Year. In 2021, the program was awarded a Flaiano awards, awards recognizing achievements in television, radio and journalism, for the Best TV Program.

== Episode list ==
=== Season 2 (1998–1999) ===
- "Enti Inutili," Aired 10/12/98 (Society - Useless and costly organisations)
- "Lo Stato Chiesa," Aired 10/12/98 (Society - Italian church)
- "Beneficenza," Aired 3/12/1998 (Society - Charity issues)
- "Acqua Pagata Acqua Regalata," Aired 12/11/1998 (Society - Water)
- "Idee, Invenzioni, Brevetti," Aired 5/11/1998 (Society - Patents)
- "La Follia," Aired 29/10/1998 (Society - Folly)
- "Il Virus Dell'Obbligo," Aired 15/10/1998 (Health - Vaccinations)
- "Non Solo Il Dente È Avvelenato," Aired 08/10/1998 (Health - Dentistry)
- "Carissima Salma," Aired 01/10/1998 (Society - Business on the dead)
- "Il Gene Sfigurato," Aired 24/09/1998 (Society - Genetics and agriculture)

=== Season 12 (2008–2009) ===
Season 12

- "L'Intesa" (Economy) - Survey on Alitalia case
- "Il Primario" (Health)
- "Gli Scoppiati" (Economy)
- "Il Sindacalista" (Society)
- "L'Eredità" (Environment) - About nuclear energy and pollution in Italy
- "Mare Nostrum" (Environment)
- "L’Oro di Roma" (Environment) - About waste crisis in Rome/Italy
- "Il Piatto È Servito" (Health/Food)
- "I Viceré" (Society)
- "Modulazione di Frequenze" (Society)
- "L'Inganno" (Environment)
- "Poveri Noi!" (Economy)
- "Come Tu M'Insegni" (Society)
- "La Cura" (Health)
- "Porte Girevoli" (Health)
- "Il Re È Nero" (Society)
- "Carne" (Health/Food)
- "Com'È Andata a Finire?" (Society)
- "Il Male Comune" (Society)
- "La Ricaduta" (Environment) - About Niger Oil and Italian Oil Company

== Trials ==
Due to its work, the survey journalists working on Report have been subject to a lot of intimidating legal action. Up until last season not one of these cases had been lost by Report. But during the 2009-2010 Italian television season Rai removed free legal assistance to their journalist.
