= Giuliano Marrucci =

Italian journalist

Giuliano Marrucci (born 24 December 1976) is an Italian investigative journalist.

== Biography ==
Marrucci was born in the town of Mirano and then moved to Pisa as a child in 1984. He earned a degree at the technical institute for social activities "Chiara Gambacorti". He is the son of Enrico Marrucci, who was an MP for the Italian Communist Party.

In the late '90s, while he was attending Physics at the University of Pisa, he began to produce reports as a freelance videojournalist in India, since his main intellectual interest was, and still is, the process of the "great return" on the global scene of the "Asian giants" India and China.

From 2001 to 2022, he was one of the authors of the investigative journalism programme Report on Rai 3. From 2010 to 2014 he has also been collaborating with the daily newspaper Il Fatto Quotidiano and from 2011 to 2015 with the newspaper Corriere della Sera.

In 2021, he was one of the founders of Ottolina TV, a web TV.

== Works ==
- Cemento rosso. Il secolo cinese mattone dopo mattone, 2017, Mimesis.
- L'economia geopolitica di Ottolina TV. Cronaca del fallimento della narrazione economica dominante, 2024, Poets&Sailors.

== Awards and honours ==
- "Elio Botti - come acqua saliente" prize, 2018. For the report "Goccia a goccia".
