= Paolo Maddalena =

Italian magistrate and academic

Vice President of the Constitutional Court
- In office 10 December 2010 – 30 July 2011
- President: Ugo De Siervo; Alfonso Quaranta
- Preceded by: Ugo De Siervo
- Succeeded by: Alfio Finocchiaro

Judge of the Constitutional Court
- In office 30 July 2002 – 30 July 2011
- Appointed by: Court of Audit
- Preceded by: Massimo Vari
- Succeeded by: Aldo Carosi

Personal details
- Born: 27 March 1936 (age 90) Naples, Kingdom of Italy
- Education: University of Naples Federico II
- Profession: Magistrate, academic

Paolo Maddalena (born 27 March 1936) is an Italian magistrate and academic, Judge of the Constitutional Court of Italy from 2002 to 2011.

== Biography ==
=== Academic career ===
After graduating in 1958, Maddalena began his academic activity in the field of Roman law, as an assistant to jurist Antonio Guarino. A free lecturer in Roman law institutions since 1971, after his entry into the judiciary, Maddalena shifted his interests towards administrative and constitutional law.

After having taught for some years at the University of Pavia, in parallel with his commitment as a magistrate, from 1991 to 1998 he was taught European Community Law for cultural and environmental heritage at the Tuscia University. In this period he has also dealt, in numerous writings, with the institutional and legal profiles of the European Union.

=== Legal career ===
Maddalena joined the Judiciary of the Court of Audit in 1971. After a long period spent at the Attorney General, in the last period, since 1995, he was the Lazio Regional Prosecutor of the accounting judiciary. He had the opportunity to apply the theses he proposed in the scientific context both by collaborating in the carrying out of numerous investigations, in particular on environmental issues, and by carrying out assignments of different nature. Among other things, he was part of the Ecology and Territory group set up at the Supreme Court of Cassation, and was Head of Cabinet of the Minister of Public Education Gerardo Bianco and Head of Legislative Office at the Ministry of the Environment.

==== Constitutional judge ====
After a long career in which he has combined study and research activities in the fields of Roman law, administrative and constitutional law and environmental law with the functions of magistrate, culminating in the appointment of section president of the Court of Auditors, on 17 July 2002 Maddalena was elected to the Constitutional Court and assumed his duties after being sworn in on 30 July. Subsequently, on 10 December 2010 he was appointed vice-president of the Court by the newly elected president Ugo De Siervo, a position in which he was reconfirmed on 6 June 2011 by the newly elected president Alfonso Quaranta. His mandate ended on 30 July 2011.

=== Later career ===
On 1 April 2014, Maddalena was appointed free expert by the Mayor of Messina Renato Accorinti, for the policies of constitutional jurisdiction for common goods.

In 2016, he expressed positions close to the No Cav movement, siding in favor of the protection of the Apuan Alps.

=== Candidate for President of Italy ===
In 2022, he was nominated as candidate for presidential election by Alternativa, the Communist Party, Italy of Values and Italexit. He obtained 36 votes on the first ballot, 39 votes on the second ballot and 61 votes on the third ballot.

== Honours and awards ==
- Italy: Knight Grand Cross of the Order of Merit of the Italian Republic (2002)

Legal offices
Preceded by Massimo Vari	Judge of the Constitutional Court of Italy; 2002–2011	Succeeded by Aldo Carosi
