= Buscema =

Buscema is an Italian surname. Notable people with the surname include:

- Angelo Buscema (born 1952), Italian magistrate and academic
- John Buscema (1927–2002), American comic book artist
- Sal Buscema (1936–2026), American comics artist

== See also ==
- Buscemi (surname)
