= Piigs =

2017 Italian documentary film by Adriano Cutraro, Federico Greco, and Mirko Melchiorre

- Directed by: Adriano Cutraro, Federico Greco, Mirko Melchiorre
- Written by: Adriano Cutraro, Federico Greco, Mirko Melchiorre
- Narrated by: Claudio Santamaria (Italian language version) Willem Dafoe (English language version)
- Edited by: Federico Greco, Mirko Melchiorre, Costantino Rover, Marco Bambina
- Music by: Paolo Baglio, Daniele Bertinelli, Antonio Genovino
- Production company: Studio Zabalik
- Distributed by: Fil Rouge Media
- Release date: 2017
- Running time: 76 min
- Country: Italy
- Language: Italian/English

Piigs is a 2017 documentary film by three Italian filmmakers which investigates the causes and the effects of austerity imposed by the European Union on its subject countries, especially in Southern Europe. The film suggests that austerity policies are aggravating the effects of the financial crisis, especially in those countries that economists have called the "PIIGS" (an acronym of Portugal, Ireland, Italy, Greece and Spain)—states that suffered high public debt and weak economies.

== Contributors ==
- Noam Chomsky
- Paolo Barnard
- Yanis Varoufakis
- Erri De Luca
- Stephanie Kelton
- Warren Mosler
- Paul De Grauwe
- Federico Rampini
- Claudia Bonfini
