= Jon Buscemi =

Italian-American fashion designer (born 1975)

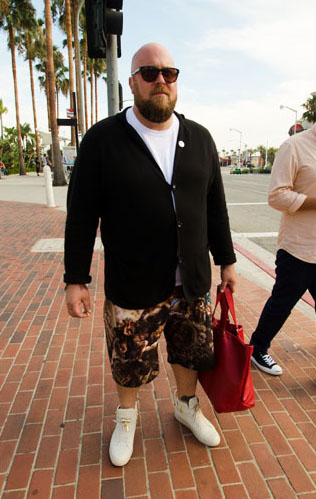
- Buscemi in 2013
- Labels: Buscemi; Greats Brand; Gourmet

Jon Buscemi (/buːˈsɛmi/ boo-SEM-ee, Italian: [buʃˈʃɛːmi]; born October 3, 1975) is an American fashion designer known for his work at Oliver Peoples, co-founding Gourmet, and his eponymous brand Buscemi. Jon Buscemi is a cousin of the actor Steve Buscemi.

== Career ==
After working on Wall Street, Buscemi began to accumulate a broad sneaker collection and soon took his hunt for exclusive and limited edition sneakers world-wide. Simultaneously, many of his skateboarding peers started their own brands in the street-wear and skate space. Through these industry connections, Buscemi was hired by skateboard footwear brand DC Shoe Co. USA to work on special projects.

In 2006, Buscemi and two partners launched the footwear brand Gourmet. During his tenure at Gourmet, the company raised controversy and fandom alike by releasing sneakers that took design cues from iconic sneaker silhouettes, such as the Air Jordan 7 and Air Jordan 11. After leaving Gourmet in January 2013, Buscemi launched the eponymous brand Buscemi at Capsule Show in Paris in June 2013.
