= Raffaele Cantone =

Italian magistrate (born 1963)

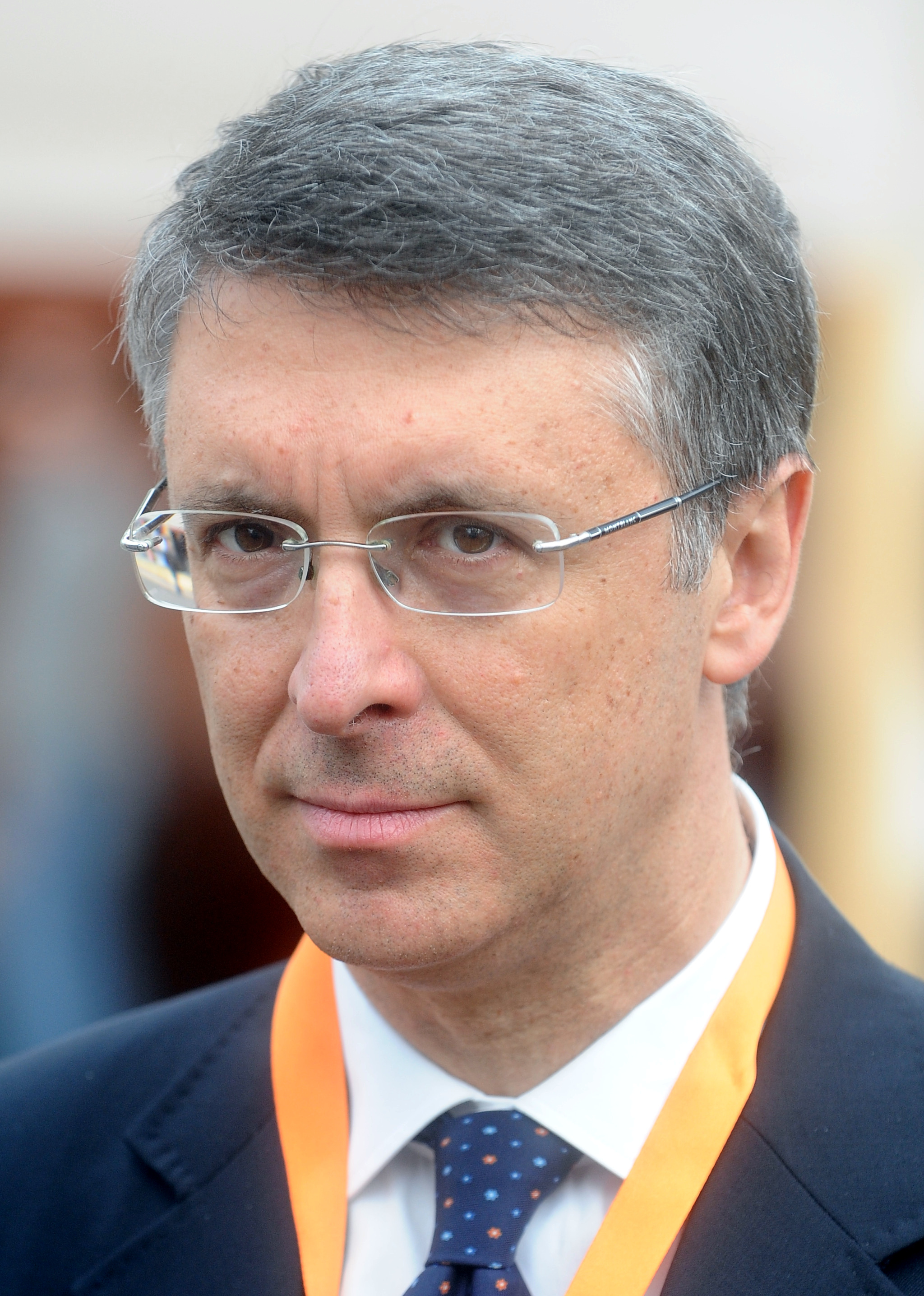
- Cantone in 2016

President of the National Anti-Corruption Authority
- In office 27 March 2014 – 23 October 2019
- Preceded by: Office established
- Succeeded by: Giuseppe Busia

Personal details
- Born: 24 November 1963 (age 62) Naples, Italy
- Spouse: Rosanna Cantone
- Children: 2
- Education: University of Naples Federico II
- Profession: Magistrate

Raffaele Cantone (born 24 November 1963) is an Italian magistrate and essayist who has served as chief prosecutor in Salerno since 27 April 2026.

From 27 March 2014 to 23 October 2019, he was president of the National Anti-Corruption Authority, having been appointed by the then Italian prime minister Matteo Renzi. From 17 June 2020 to March 2026 he served as chief prosecutor in Perugia, following his appointment by the High Council of the Judiciary.

Cantone has lived under police protection since 1999 and under armed escort since 2003, after authorities uncovered a plot by the Casalesi clan to kill him. He served for four parliamentary terms as a consultant to the Parliamentary Anti-Mafia Commission and contributed to its report on Camorra organised crime in Campania.

== Early life and education ==
Cantone was born in Naples, the son of a state official (his father) and a pharmacist (his mother), Mimmina Scialò, who died on 12 September 2019; he has two brothers, Michele and Bruno. He grew up in Giugliano in Campania. Cantone graduated in law at the University of Naples Federico II with the intention of becoming a lawyer and entered the Italian magistrature in 1991, participating in a competition for 160 posts on the advice to undertake this career provided by his uncle, Nicola Giovannone, a marshal major of the Guardia di Finanza.

== Career ==
Cantone was a deputy prosecutor at the court of Naples, where he mainly dealt with economic crime, until 1999, when he joined the District Anti-Mafia Directorate of the Naples Prosecutor's Office, of which he was part until 2007. Assigned to the Caserta area, he dealt with the investigations into the Casalesi clan, also reported in Roberto Saviano's best seller Gomorrah, and managed to obtain life sentences for the most important leaders of that group, including Francesco Schiavone (who was known as Sandokan), Francesco Bidognetti (who was known as Cicciotto 'e Mezzanott), Walter Schiavone (who was known as Walterino), Augusto La Torre, Mario Esposito, and numerous others. He also dealt with investigations into infiltrations in the waste sector and infiltrations of Caserta clans abroad, in particular in Scotland, where a real branch of the La Torre clan of Mondragone dedicated to reinvestment in entrepreneurial and commercial activities was identified of illicit proceeds, and in Germany, Romania, and Hungary, where members of the Schiavone clan had settled and purchased real estate and businesses while in hiding. He oversaw the line of investigations that concerned the investments of the Zagaria group in Parma and Milan, leading to the conviction of an important real estate developer from Parma for Camorra association.

In 2007, Cantone started working at the Office of the Maximar of Italy's Supreme Court of Cassation, where he coordinated the criminal sector. In November 2013, he expressed his desire to return to investigative activity, and presented to the High Council of the Judiciary the request for appointment as deputy prosecutor at the Prosecutor's Office of the newly created North Naples Court. In December 2011, Cantone was appointed by Filippo Patroni Griffi, the then Minister for Public Administration and Simplification, as a member of the commission that developed the first anti-corruption proposals of the Monti government, from which the Severino Law arose. He was awarded honorary citizenship of the municipality of Cortona on 24 March 2012 and obtained that of the municipality of Agerola on 15 October 2012. On 21 March 2013, during the Day of Memory and Commitment in Memory of the Victims of the Mafia, he was awarded honorary citizenship of the municipality of Sessa Aurunca. On 18 June 2013, he was appointed by the then Italian prime minister Enrico Letta as a member of the task force for the development of proposals on the fight against organized crime in Italy led by Reggio Calabria prosecutor Nicola Gratteri.

On 27 March 2014, Cantone was appointed president of the National Anti-Corruption Authority by the then Italian prime minister Matteo Renzi. He held the office until October 2019. During this period, he was on leave from the judiciary due to his role as president of the National Anti-Corruption Authority. His appointment was confirmed by the constitutional affairs commissions of the Chamber of Deputies and Senate of the Republic unanimously. After the second wave of arrests for the construction of Expo 2015, Cantone was entrusted by the Renzi government at the supervision of procurement to a government commissioner. On the initiative of Cantone, the institute of collaborative supervision was inaugurated on an experimental basis, i.e. the preliminary verification of the legitimacy of the tender procedures by the National Anti-Corruption Authority, with the aim of avoiding administrative disputes and reducing the risks of corruption. Recognized as an international best practice by the OECD, which dedicated a monographic publication to it, (Note: See Bonucci, Nicola; Cantone, Raffaele (16 March 2015). High-Level Principles for Integrity, Transparency and Effective Control of Major Events and Related Infrastructures (PDF). OECD.) the new Procurement Code institutionalized the collaborative supervision of the National Anti-Corruption Authority, which can be requested for particularly important contracts by the stations contracting parties subject to the stipulation of a specific memorandum of understanding; it was made into law on 19 April 2016.

In 2016, Cantone was appointed by Andrea Orlando, the then Minister of Justice, as coordinator of the technical table "Mafias, Corruption, and Public Administrations" within the General States of the Fight Against Mafias. He also participated in the work of the international consultancy on justice, corruption, organized crime, and mafias, which was established at the Dicastery for Promoting Integral Human Development in Vatican. In September 2016, Cantone testified as part of the Mafia Capitale investigation. He said that the National Anti-Corruption Authority "does not formulate hypotheses of crime but limits itself to reporting irregularities when there is a hint of criminal offence. To date, there have never been any cases of 416-bis [the charge for Mafia-type association]." In April 2017, he was appointed president of the arbitration panel for the provision through a solidarity fund of benefits in favour of the investors of the banks in liquidation Banca Etruria, Banca delle Marche, Cassa di Risparmio della Provincia di Chieti, and Cassa di Risparmio di Ferrara.

In July 2019, through an open letter published on the website of the National Anti-Corruption Authority, Cantone announced his intention to return to the judiciary "due to the emergence of a different cultural approach towards the [National Anti-Corruption Authority] and its role", as fellow magistrate Luca Palamara was accused of corruption. On 24 October 2019, he officially returned to the Office of the Magistrate of the Court of Cassation, where he had served before assuming the presidency of the National Anti-Corruption Authority. On 17 June 2020, during the session of the High Council of the Judiciary, with a vote of 12−8, it endorsed his appointment as the chief prosecutor of Perugia. On 24 June 2020, the Ministry of Justice, by then led by Alfonso Bonafede, authorized his early appointment at the Perugia headquarters, where he could take up service as early as 29 June 2020. In March 2024, Cantone was called to testify as part of the Antimafia Commission auditions related to the alleged illegal dossiers of many public figures and politicians. He spoke of "monstrous and disturbing numbers".

== Writings and awards ==
Cantone is the author of numerous articles published in the newspaper Il Mattino and numerous publications on legal matters. He collaborates with legal journals, such as Cassazione Penale, Rivista Penale, Archivio nuova procedura politica, and Gazzetta Forense. He was a contract professor for the chair of criminal law at the University of Naples Federico II the 2003−2004 academic year and was for five years until 2009−2010 a contract professor of administrative criminal law at the Guglielmo Marconi University in Rome. During his career, Cantone received a number of awards, including among others the Enzo Biagi Award (2008), Recanati Festival Award (2009), National Award for the Culture of Legality (2009), National Award for Judicial, Investigative, and Investigative Journalism "Domenico Calabrò" (2014), Don Diana National Award (2015), Guido Dorso Award (2015), 100 Italian Excellences Award (2016), International Award for Culture "City of Alcamo" (2017), Cimitile Award (2017), Rome Award (2017), Sepe Award (2017), International Carlo Pisacane Award (2017), Cosimo Fanzago Award (2017), Canova Prize for economic and financial literature (with Francesco Caringella) (2018), and Re Manfredi Award for Legality (2018). In 2008, he published Solo per giustizia for Mondadori, an autobiographical work in which he recalled his experience as a frontline magistrate. A similar work, Gattopardi, published in 2010 by Mondadori for the Strade blu series, which became a best seller. In April 2012, Operazione Penelope was published in the Frecce series by Mondadori; it was a book where Cantone addressed the topic of mafias by analyzing an answer to a question, which was contained in the subtitle of the text "Why the Fight Against Organized Crime and Criminal Activity Risks Never Ending". From the Homeric poem, where Penelope creates and undoes while waiting for Odysseus, Cantone took this metaphor as a model, analyzing the dynamics that revolve around the mafias and the possibilities of succeeding in the fight against them. In Football clan, which was published in 2012 by Rizzoli Libri, Cantone and Gianluca Di Feo attempted to reconstruct the relationship between the mafia and football.

Appointed in 2013 as teacher of the Tax Police School for courses for officers and non-commissioned officers of the Financial Police on the subject of anti-mafia legislation, Cantone carried out teaching activities at the National School of Administration, the Higher Police School, the Higher School of the Presidency of the Council of Ministers, the Technical Investigative Institute of the Carabinieri, and the Institute for Advanced Defense Studies. In the 2016−2017 academic year, he taught Administrative Responsibility and Anti-Corruption Legislation at the University of Cassino and Southern Lazio. As contract professor free of charge, he also taught Anti-Mafia Legislation: Substantive and Procedural Profiles" at the Suor Orsola Benincasa University of Naples and "Prevention of Corruption and Transparency in Public Administration" at the Department of Law from the University of Naples Federico II. In 2017, Cantone authored La corruzione spuzza, which was written together with Council of State member Francesco Caringella. Taking up a phrase pronounced by Pope Francis in Scampia, the book reviewed, as stated in its subtitle, "all the effects on our daily lives of the disease that risks killing Italy", from healthcare to education and from politics to procurement public. It also saw an event organized by the Italian Association of Young Lawyers that was attended, among others, by the then Confindustria Foggia president Gianni Rotice and former Puglia president Nichi Vendola. This was followed up by La corruzione spiegata ai ragazzi che hanno a cuore il futuro del loro Paese (2018), which was born from the suggestion made by numerous students and teachers during the presentation of the previous book in schools to create a text that was designed specifically for younger people. The book was presented in May 2018. In Corruzione. Prevenire e reprimere per una cultura della legalità, which was written for the Piccola biblioteca per un paese normale series and published in 2023 by Vita e pensiero, Cantone attempted to provide a complete picture of the mafia phenomenon, including definition, ways in which corruption manifests itself and how to measure it, combat it, and prevent it; it was accompanied by historical references, anthropological analyzes, and prospects for the future. He discussed the book in December 2023.

== Personal life ==
Cantone is married to Rosanna Cantone and they have two children, Enrico and Claudia. He lives under protection since 1999 and under guard since 2003 after the discovery of a plan to attack him organized by the Casalesi clan. For four legislatures, he was a consultant to the Antimafia Commission, also participating in the drafting of the report on Camorra-type organized crime in Campania. He is honorary president of Libera. Associazioni, nomi e numeri contro le mafie in Giugliano in Campania, which was dedicated to Filomena Morlando, a victim of the Camorra. He is a supporter of SSC Napoli.

== Works ==
=== Books ===
- Solo per giustizia. Vita di un magistrato contro la camorra, Milan, Mondadori, 2008, ISBN 978-88-04-58011-9.
- Il farmacista Mascolo, in La ferita. Racconti per le vittime innocenti di camorra, Naples, Ad est dell'equatore, 2009, ISBN 978-88-95797-10-6.
- I gattopardi. Uomini d'onore e colletti bianchi: la metamorfosi delle mafie nell'Italia di oggi, Milan, Mondadori, 2010, ISBN 978-88-04-60327-6.
- Operazione Penelope. Perché la lotta alla criminalità organizzata e al malaffare rischia di non finire mai, Milan, Mondadori, 2010, ISBN 978-88-04-62138-6.
- Football clan. Perché il calcio è diventato lo sport più amato dalle mafie, with Gianluca Di Feo, Milan, Rizzoli, 2012, ISBN 978-88-17-05900-8.
- I Casalesi. Nascita ed evoluzione, in Atlante delle mafie, Cosenza, Rubbettino Editore, 2012, ISBN 978-88-498-3424-6.
- Il collega che avrei voluto conoscere, in Dove Eravamo. Vent'anni dopo Capaci e via D'Amelio, Naples, Caracò Editore, 2012, ISBN 978-88-97567-08-0.
- Il male italiano. Liberarsi dalla corruzione per cambiare il paese, with Gianluca Di Feo, Milan, Rizzoli, 2015, ISBN 978-88-17-07426-1.
- La corruzione spuzza. Tutti gli effetti sulla nostra vita quotidiana della malattia che rischia di uccidere l'Italia, with Francesco Caringella, Milan, Mondadori, 2017, ISBN 978-88-04-67300-2.
- La corruzione spiegata ai ragazzi che hanno a cuore il futuro del loro paese, con Francesco Caringella, Milan, Mondadori, 2018. ISBN 88-04-68606-5, ISBN 978-88-04-68606-4.
- Corruzione e anticorruzione. Dieci lezioni, with Enrico Carloni, Feltrinelli, 2018. EAN 978-88-07-17344-8.
- La coscienza e la legge, with Vincenzo Paglia, Laterza, 2019. EAN 978-8-85-813522-8.
- Corruzione. Prevenire e reprimere per una cultura della legalità, Milan, Vita e Pensiero, 2023. EAN 978-88-34-34352-4.

=== Monographs ===
- 7. I delitti contro l'amministrazione della giustizia e i delitti contro il sentimento religioso e la pietà dei defunti, edited with Maria Grazia Rosa and Carmelo Sgroi, Milan, Giuffrè, 2000, ISBN 88-14-08232-4.
- Il giusto processo. Commento alla Legge 1º marzo 2001, n. 63 (attuazione della legge costituzionale di riforma dell'art. 3 Costituzione), Naples, Edizioni Giuridiche Simone, 2001, ISBN 88-244-9816-7.
- I reati fallimentari, Naples, Edizioni Giuridiche Simone, 2001, ISBN 88-244-9643-1.
- La prova documentale, Milan, Giuffré, 2004, ISBN 88-14-11234-7.
- La nuova Autorità nazionale anticorruzione, edited with Francesco Merloni, Turin, Giappichelli, 2015, ISBN 978-88-7524-231-2.
- Codice dell'anticorruzione e della trasparenza, with Francesco Merloni, Santarcangelo di Romagna, Maggioli, 2018, ISBN 978-88-916-3023-0.

=== Prefaces ===
- Raffaele Cantone, Associazione per delinquere di stampo mafioso; Voto di scambio; Postfazione, Rome, Castelvecchi Rx, in Dizionario enciclopedico delle mafie in Italia, 2013, ISBN 978-88-7615-864-3.
- Baldieri-Franzinelli, Il volto di Gomorra, Milan, Mondadori, 2011, ISBN 978-88-370-8459-2.
- Aa.Vv, Carta straccia. Economia dei diritti sospesi, Naples, Ad est dell'equatore, 2011, ISBN 978-88-95797-23-6.
- Corrado De Rosa, I medici della camorra, Rome, Castelvecchi editore, 2011, ISBN 978-88-7615-525-3.
- Aa.Vv, La ferita. Racconti per le vittime innocenti di camorra, Naples, Ad est dell'Equatore, 2009, ISBN 978-88-95797-10-6.
- Fabio Cutolo, Il tesoro di Federico, Naples, Flegrea, 2016, ISBN 978-88-941273-1-7.
- Andrea Franzoso, Il disobbediente, Rome, PaperFIRST, 2017, ISBN 978-88-997841-8-8.
