= Antonio Palmieri =

Italian politician (born 1961)

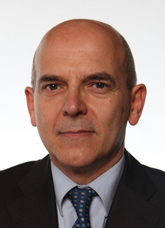
- Palmieri in 2013

Member of the Chamber of Deputies
- In office 30 May 2001 – 12 October 2022
- Preceded by: Paolo Colombo
- Constituency: Cantù (2001–2006); Lombardy 2 (2006–2018); Lombardy 2 – P02 (2018–2022)

Personal details
- Born: 14 February 1961 (age 65)
- Party: Forza Italia (since 2013)
- Other political affiliations: Forza Italia (1994–2009); The People of Freedom (2009–2013)

Antonio Palmieri (born 14 February 1961) is an Italian politician. From 2001 to 2022, he was a member of the Chamber of Deputies. From 1995 to 2022, he served as national internet manager of Forza Italia, The People of Freedom and Forza Italia.
