= Ferdinando Imposimato =

Italian magistrate (1936–2018)

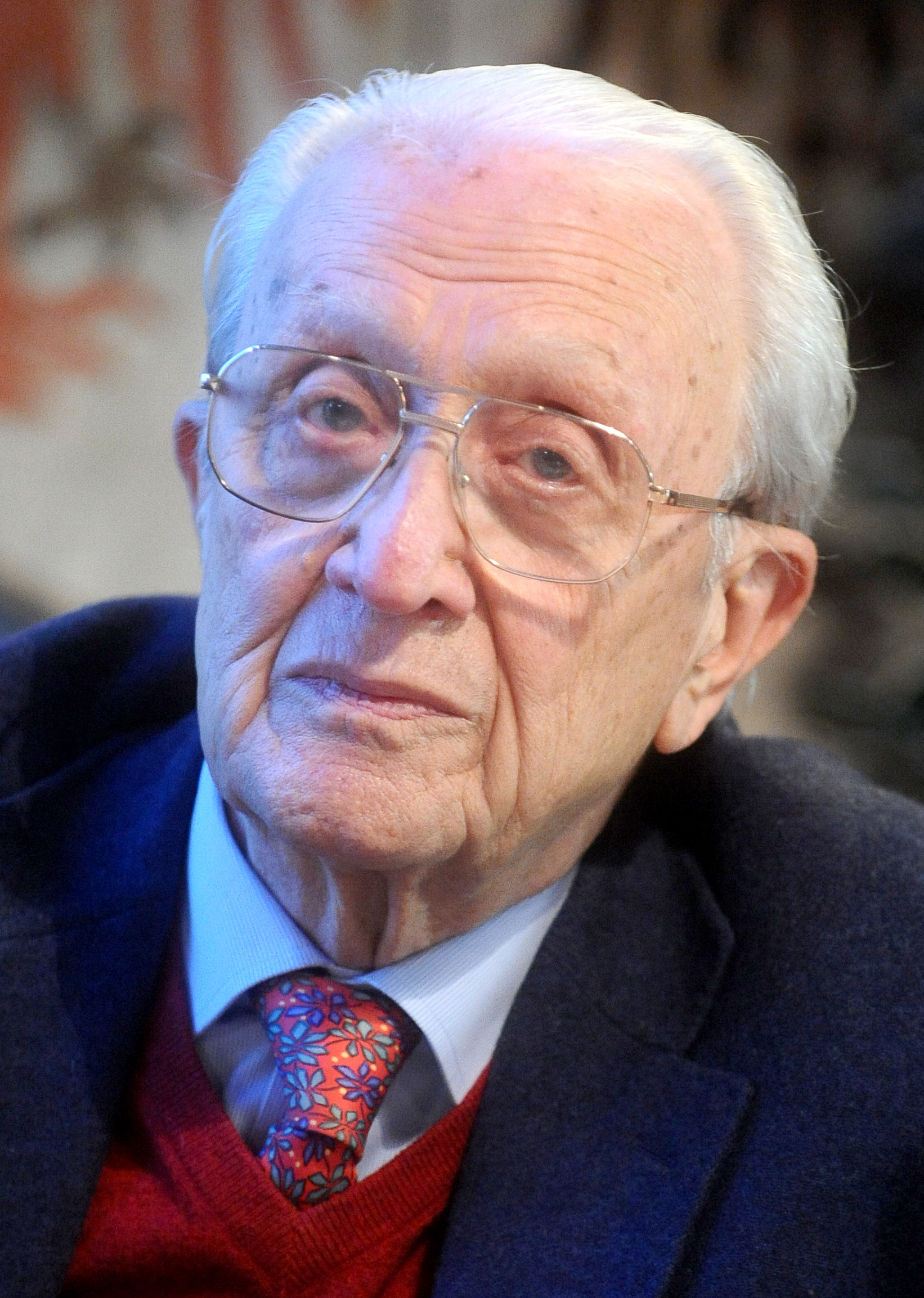
- Imposimato in 2016

Member of the Senate of the Republic
- In office 15 April 1994 – 8 May 1996
- Constituency: Campania
- In office 2 July 1987 – 22 April 1992
- Constituency: Campania

Member of the Chamber of Deputies
- In office 23 April 1992 – 14 April 1994
- Constituency: Campania

Personal details
- Born: 9 April 1936 Maddaloni, Italy
- Died: 2 January 2018 (aged 81) Rome, Italy
- Party: Independent
- Education: University of Naples

Ferdinando Imposimato (9 April 1936 – 2 January 2018) was an Italian magistrate and the honorary president of the Supreme Court of Italy.

== Biography ==
Imposimato was born at Maddaloni, in the province of Caserta, in 1936. He graduated in law at the University of Naples in 1959. After becoming police vice-commissar, he worked in Brescia and then in Forlì. After one year in Rome as a functionary of the Ministry of Treasury, he became a magistrate in 1964.

During his career as a prosecutor, Imposimato was in charge of the investigation for the kidnapping of Aldo Moro, Mehmet Ali Ağca's attempted assassination of Pope John Paul II, the assassination of banker Michele Sindona, and several Mafia trials. In 1981 he was in charge of the trial against the Banda della Magliana. Two years later, his brother Franco was killed in revenge and, after endless menaces against his family from organized crime, he left his work as judge in 1986, working as United Nations consultant against the drugs market. He also dealt with violations of human rights in South America.

In 1987, Imposimato was elected to the Italian Senate on the list of the Independent Left, associated with the Italian Communist Party. In 1992 he was re-elected to the Chamber of Deputies. He was a member of the Parliamentary Anti-Mafia Commission in three consecutive legislatures.

Imposimato believed that some top members of the CIA were aware of the presence of 9/11 terrorists in the United States but did not alert "the only agency competent to counter terrorism on US soil", the FBI. He suggested that the only possibility for achieving justice is to submit the case to the prosecutor of the International Criminal Court.

In January 2015, Imposimato was nominated by the Five Star Movement as its candidate for the 2015 Italian presidential election after an online survey by supporters of the movement, winning 32% of the votes.

Imposimato died on 2 January 2018 in Rome, at the age of 81.
