= Milena Gabanelli =

Italian journalist and television host (born 1954)

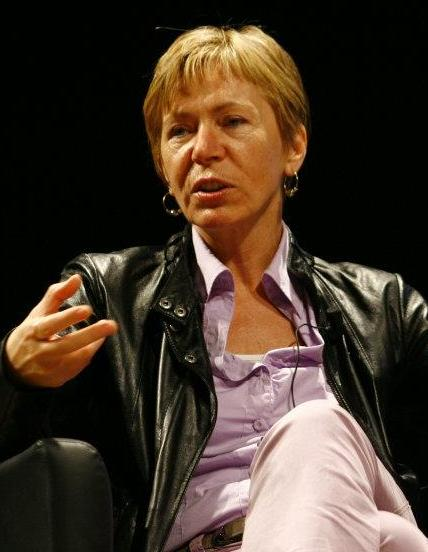
Milena Gabanelli

Milena Gabanelli (born 9 June 1954 in Nibbiano) is an Italian journalist and television host, better known in Italy for the investigative journalism Television program Report. The program is currently broadcast by the Italian public TV channel Rai 3.

Gabanelli declined a nomination as candidate in the 2013 Italian presidential election; she had been proposed by Beppe Grillo's Five Star Movement. Milena Gabanelli left RAI on November 15, 2017. She collaborates with Corriere della Sera and the private TV station La7.
