= Court of Audit (Italy) =

Italian supreme audit institution

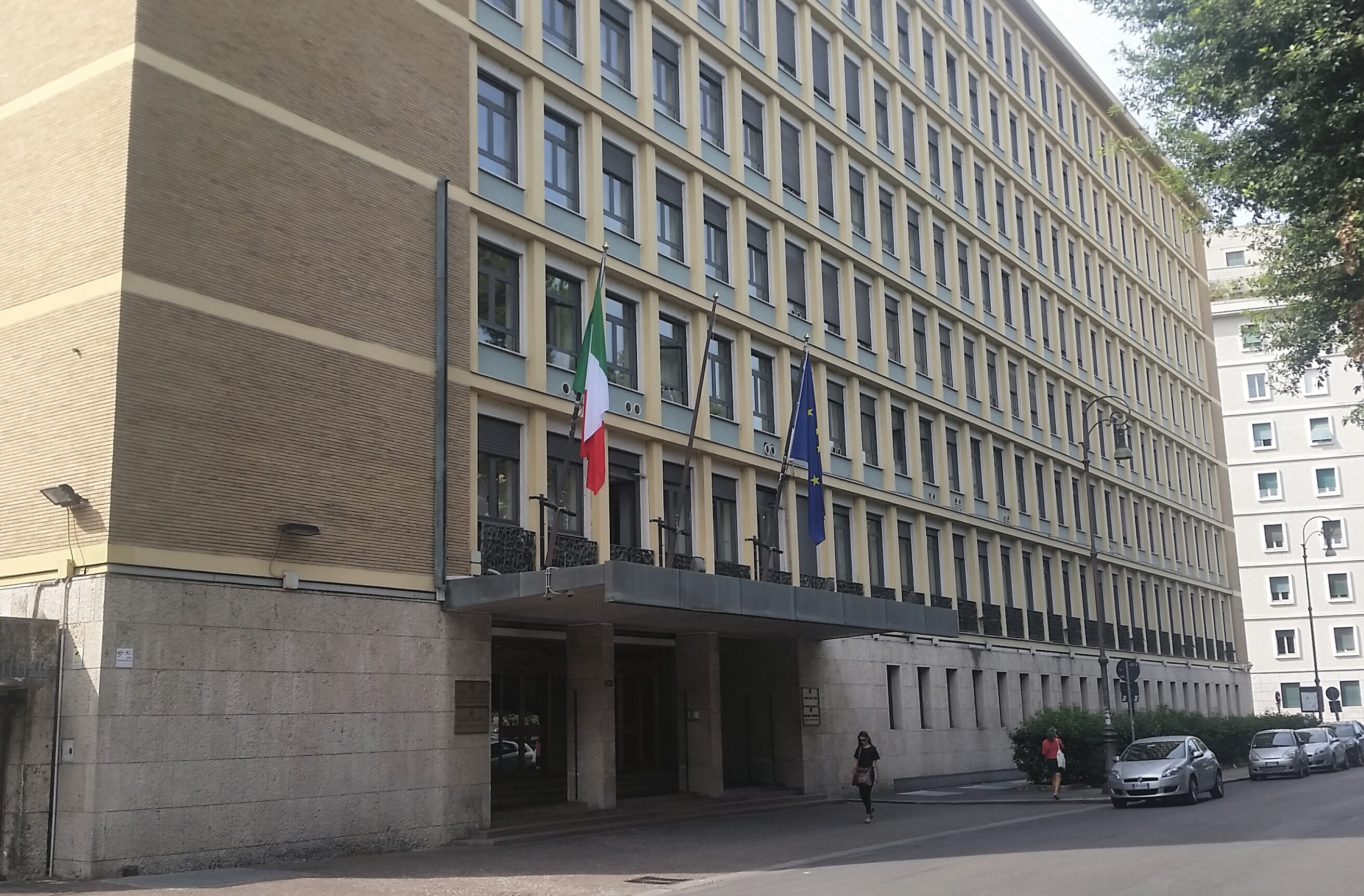
Court of Audit, main seat in Rome

The Court of Audit (Italian: Corte dei conti) is an Italian Court of Audit, an institution of constitutional importance, established by Articles 100 & 103 of the Constitution of Italy, which is among the supplementary institutions of the government. The Court of Audit has consultative, review, and jurisdictional functions.

== History ==
Although its organisation and powers have changed over time, the Court of Audit dates back to the early years of the Italian state. It was instituted by Law no.800 of 14 August 1862, in order to monitor the administration of the state, and was inaugurated at Turin on 10 October 1862.

The Court is the heir of institutions which monitored public finances before the Unification of Italy, such as the Chamber of Audit (Camera dei conti) of the Duchy of Savoy and then the kingdom of Sardinia, established in 1351 and replaced in 1859 by the Court of Audit (Corte dei conti) on which the Italian institution of 1862 was closely modelled. Other precursors include the Chamber of Audit (Camera dei conti) of the Kingdom of Lombardy–Venetia, established in 1771; the Regia Camera della Sommaria of the Kingdom of Naples, founded in 1444 and replaced by the Royal Court of Audit (Regia Corte dei Conti) in 1807. Auditing of accounts is also attested in Apostolic Camera of the Papal States as far back as the thirteenth century. In 1828 the Papal States instituted the Congregation for the Revision of Accounts and Affairs of Public Administration (Congregazione di revisione dei conti e degli affari di pubblica amministrazione) within the Apostolic Camera (which was subsequently replaced by the Council of State for Finance (Consulta di Stato per le Finanze) from 1850 until 1870), with the role of examining and reviewing the prospective and actual budgets of the state and providing opinions on financial matters.

The regulations governing the Court of Audit are complex. Particularly important is the testo unico of royal decree no.1214 of 12 July 1934, which was integrated into decree law no.452 of 15 November 1993 (converted, with revisions, into Law no.19 of 14 January 1994), Law no.20 of 14 January 1994, and Law no.639 of 20 December 1996. Revisions were also made by Law no.205 of 2000.

== Organisation ==
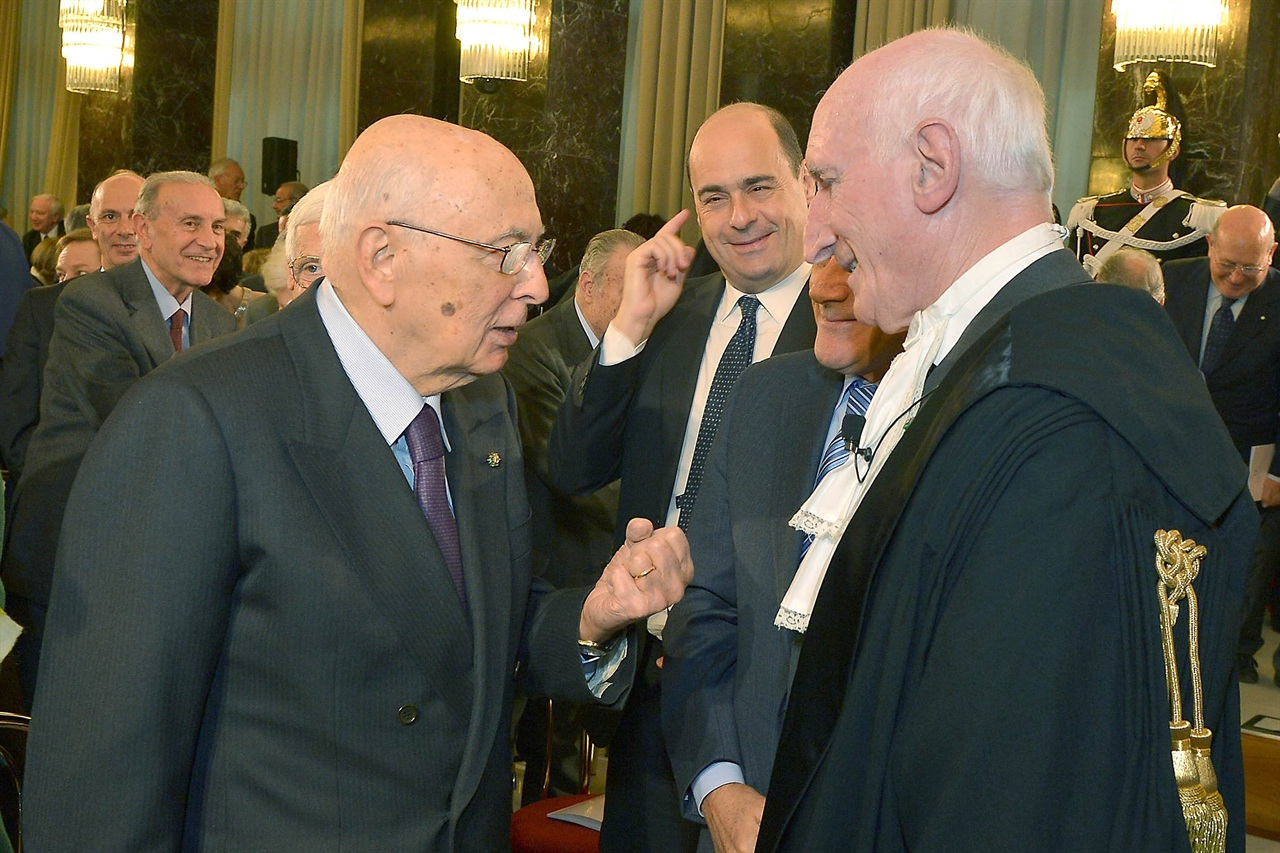
President Napolitano with Raffaele Squitieri, President of the Court of Audit.

The Court of Audit has central and regional offices. The court as a whole is headed by the President of the Court of Audit. The President chairs the Council of the President of the Court of Audit, which has little power, but is the equivalent for magistrates of the Court of Audit to the High Council of the Judiciary for the regular judiciary. The Council of the President of the Court of Audit is based in Rome. It consists of:

- the President of the Court of Audit (who presides over it),
- the Prosecutor-General of the Court of Audit,
- the Adjunct-President of the Court of Audit (or the oldest Departmental President),
- four elected citizens (two chosen by the Chamber of Deputies, two by the Senate by simple majority votes, who must be professors of jurisprudence or lawyers with twenty years of professional experience),
- four magistrates (distributed among different groups in proportion to their numbers on 1 January of the year when the council is formed).

The court is divided into jurisdictional and review divisions, both at the central and territorial levels. The divisions are not distributed uniformly over the national territory.

Alongside the Court of Audit at the central level is the Office of the Prosecutor General for Audits, headed by the Prosecutor General and twenty Deputy Prosecutors General. Peculiarly, the Office of the Prosecutor General in Jurisdictional Appeal divisions for the Region of Sicily is treated as the Sicilian branch office of the central Office of the Prosecutor General for Audits.

The Court of Audit has three central departments of jurisdictional appeal, based at Rome, near the Court of Audit, as well as the department of jurisdictional appeal for the Region of Sicily, which is based at Palermo.

There are also the Joint divisions of the Court of Audit, which decide questions of principle and of jurisdictional conflicts. These are based in Rome, but there are three special divisions for Sardinia (based at Cagliari), for Sicily (based at Palermo), and for Trentino-Alto Adige (based at Rome).

=== Regional divisions ===
There are jurisdictional divisions and review divisions, as well as a regional prosector's office, for each of the sixteen jurisdictional territories of audit: Piedmont, Lombardy, Venetia, Liguria, Emilia-Romagna, Tuscany, Latium, Marche, Umbria, Abruzzo, Molise, Campania, Apulia, Basilicata, Calabria and Aosta Valley.

There are other regions with a different arrangement. These are all regions with special status:

- Trentino-Alto Adige has a subdivision for each of the two autonomous provinces:
  - South Tyrol, with jurisdictional division, regional prosecutor's office, regional review division, and joint division, based in Rome
  - Trento, with jurisdictional division, regional prosecutor's office, local review division, and joint division, based in Rome
- Friuli-Venezia Giulia, with jurisdictional division, regional prosecutor's office, regional review division, and a branch office in Udine
- Sardinia, with jurisdictional division, regional prosecutor's office, regional review division, and joint division, based in Cagliari
- Sicily, with jurisdictional division, regional prosecutor's office, regional review division, jurisdictional appeal division and joint division, based in Palermo

=== Composition for jurisdictional functions ===
For its jurisdictional functions, the Court of Audit is divided into:

- Regional jurisdictional divisions, which judge in the first instance; they have a court in the capital city of each region (as well as the autonomous province of South Tyrol).
- Central jurisdictional divisions of appeal, which judge in the second instance; there are three of these, all based at the Court of Audit building in Rome (there is a separate jurisdictional division of appeal for Sicily, based in Palermo)
- Joint divisions, which resolve jurisdictional conflicts between the various regional and central divisions, and are summoned to determine "questions of principle" (when there is doubt or interpretative "conflict" between the different divisions) by the President of the Court of Audit or the Prosecutor General of the Court of Audit.

Alongside every regional jurisdictional division is a regional prosecutor's office, with the role of state prosecutor in cases of public administration. The state prosecutors are independent of and cannot be removed by the magistrates of the ordinary courts; their powers are defined by Art. 74 of the testo unico of Court of Audit and by Article 5.6 of Law 19/1994.

The Prosecutor General and the Deputy Prosecutors General have the role of state prosecutors in the central divisions of appeal and in the joint divisions. The Prosecutor General also has the role of co-ordinating the regional prosecutor's offices.

=== Composition for review functions ===
The divisions of the Court of Audit for reviews are:

- The State Review Division, which discharges its powers in accordance with Law no.20/1994 (modified by Law no.639/1996) and the criteria indicated by the Joint divisions, with two main principles: the review of legality and of economic efficiency/efficacy. This division is divided into four colleges: one for judgements on legislation, one for judgements on acquisition of revenue, and two for judgements on expenditures.
- The Division for Reviews on State Entities, which operates under Law no.259/1958. Since the privatisations of the 1990s, it also regulates the activities of public and private entities which receive state funding, detecting inequity in state contracts, state aid, and competitions.
- The Division for Reviews on Autonomy, which has control over territorial subdivisions and particularly over public works projects financed by the Cassa Depositi e Prestiti, projects co-financed by the European Union, parking financed under law no.122/1989, and the direct or indirect administration of some local public services by local entities (fishing, etc.).

The Audit Chamber for EU and International Affairs, newly established by Law no. 20/1994, which has power over national programmes which utilise EU funds. Since 2008, it has performed the role of "external auditor" for some international organisations (CERN, ITU, ICAO) and is a Member of UN External Auditor Panel and Technical Group.

The Joint Divisions have the power to define the general criteria for each half-year and co-ordinating guidelines for the investigation of the next state budget.

== Functions ==
The Court of Audit is a multi-functional institutions. Particularly important is the jurisdictional function in the realm of public administration. The Court of Audit is the special administrative judge mentioned in Article 103 of the Constitution. In this role it has jurisdiction over matters of public accounts and matters governed by the law. The Court of Audit is called upon to make decisions in cases of controversy concerning public accounts and in particular on actions of the administration relating to public employees and public administrators, as well as administrators and officials of societies under public control and controversies about pensions.

The Court of Audit makes preventative reviews of the legality of acts of the government and civil service, and a review of the final expenditures of the state, civil service, and entities to which the state contributes funds.

The review functions of the Court extend to the administrative subdivisions of the state (regions, provinces, and comuni) in order to ensure internal stability within Italy and between Italy and the European Union. The Court also carries out preventative review of the legality of the acts of administrative subdivisions and their expenditures. These functions are carried out by the regional divisions of the court. The Court also has advisory functions, presenting opinions and reports when it is required to report directly to Parliament on the results of its reviews.

The Court of Audit also watches over the civil service. In the course of reviews, it can modify, suspend, and annul the orders of other organs of state for having insufficient financial cover or for sub-optimal use of public resources, with the force of an executive title.

=== Judgment of responsibility ===
In the execution of its jurisdictional powers, the Court of Audit does not face the limitations of the ordinary judiciary in administrative matters. On the contrary, the Court determines both facts and law in a full and exclusive manner, as it is a special court. The Court of Audit has competence to judge matters of public accounts and especially the administrative responsibilities of public officials who are summoned to account for their activities in the event of economic loss to the state as a result of malicious or culpable behaviour. This competence has been recently extended to include organisations whose capital is controlled by the state or by other public entities.

Although the regulations are contained in special laws (R.D. 1038/1933), which belong to the Civil Procedure Rules, the procedure has many characteristics of a criminal process. Actions are initiated by a Prosecutor General and decisions are made by the jurisdictional division after a public hearing. Before the initiation of the action, the prosecutor must present an request for information (that is, to present documents or deductions within no less than 30 days) to the interested parties. The request for information has the characteristics of an investigation and grants on the right to a legal defence. After the period for the presentation of information has elapsed, the prosecutor has 120 days to take action (this period can be extended with the permission of the relevant division of the court). In this period, the prosecutor performs its investigative activities in order to determine wrongdoing. If the prosecutor decides to take action, it must submit a citation to the Court of Audit so that the president of the court can schedule a hearing. The act of citation must indicate the relevant facts and the foundation of the case.

The Court gives judgment on whether the conduct of the audited agent has conformed to legal and conventional norms. The audited agent is the subject who manages public assets for a civil service account (e.g. treasurer, steward, co-signatory, collection agent) They must present the account of their conduct to their own office; their office must then submit the account to the Court. When the submission reaches the secretary of the court, the agent is automatically placed under judgment (referred to as "necessary judgment" (giudizio necessario). This is different from the so-called "administrative" account (amministrativo), for which it is enough to present the account for which the subject carried out the conduct (e.g. an official exercising delegated power) to the administration. The judgment follows an investigation, conducted by the relevant magistrate. If everything is found to be in order, then the magistrate produces a ruling proposing the discharge of the agent and if the prosecutor agrees with the magistrate's finding, then the president of the division of the Court publishes an order for discharge, which closes the case. If the magistrate finds in favour of the prosecution, then the judgment must be affirmed by the entire division and the reason is recorded.

=== Pension judgments ===
A pension judgment (giudizio pensionistico) is a judgment which has been proposed by an individual who claims that their pension (which must be a public pension) has not been allocated correctly by the relevant body in terms of amount/value or who wishes to challenge the refusal of a pension which they have requested. Such judgments can concern war pensions, civil pensions, or military pensions (both ordinary and exceptional). The right to a pension is a subjective right and is not prescribed, nor is the possibility of presenting recourse prescribed, but the individual accruals of the pension are subject to prescription.

Unlike the judgment of responsibility, the prosecutor is not involved in this process. Cases are directed to the regional division after the organisation responsible for the pension has been notified. After this, the date of a hearing is established. The parties can present documents and testimony at any time up to ten days before the hearing.

=== Appeal ===
Any appeal must be filed within sixty days of the notification of the judgment or within a year of its publication. Thus the term within which the appeal must be made depends on the type of judgment. For pension judgments, notification must be made by the entity from which the pension is sought. In judgments of responsibility, the notification must be directed to the prosecutor general. Within thirty days of notification, the appeal must be submitted to the secretary of the central office of the Court of Audit, along with a copy of the decision which is being challenged.

Against the decisions of the jurisdictional divisions it is possible to make appeal to the central divisions. Pension judgments can be appealed only on matters of law, not on matters of fact regarding the situation which led to the pension.

Judgments of the central divisions of the Court of Audit can be appealed to the Supreme Court of Cassation only if they concern matters of jurisdiction. According to Article 111 of the Constitution, the other possible recourse is request for repeal of the judgment, which can be made to both the central and regional divisions.

== Primary Sources ==
- Constitution of the Republic of Italy
- "Law no.20 / 14 January 1994". Archived from the original on 15 November 2011.
- "Decree Law no.453 / 15 November 1993". Archived from the original on 16 November 2011.

== Bibliography ==
- Mario Alemanno, Manuale di diritto pubblico dell'economia, ed. Kappa, Roma 1995
- Paolo Caretti & Ugo De Siervo, Diritto costituzionale e pubblico, Torino, Giappichelli Editore, 2012. ISBN 978-88-348-28-328.
- Luisa Motolese, La Corte dei Conti nel nuovo ordinamento contabile, Vita e Pensiero, 2007
- V. Tenore, La nuova Corte dei Conti. Responsabilità, pensioni, controlli, Giuffrè, 2008
