= Stefano Rodotà =

Italian jurist and politician (1933–2017)

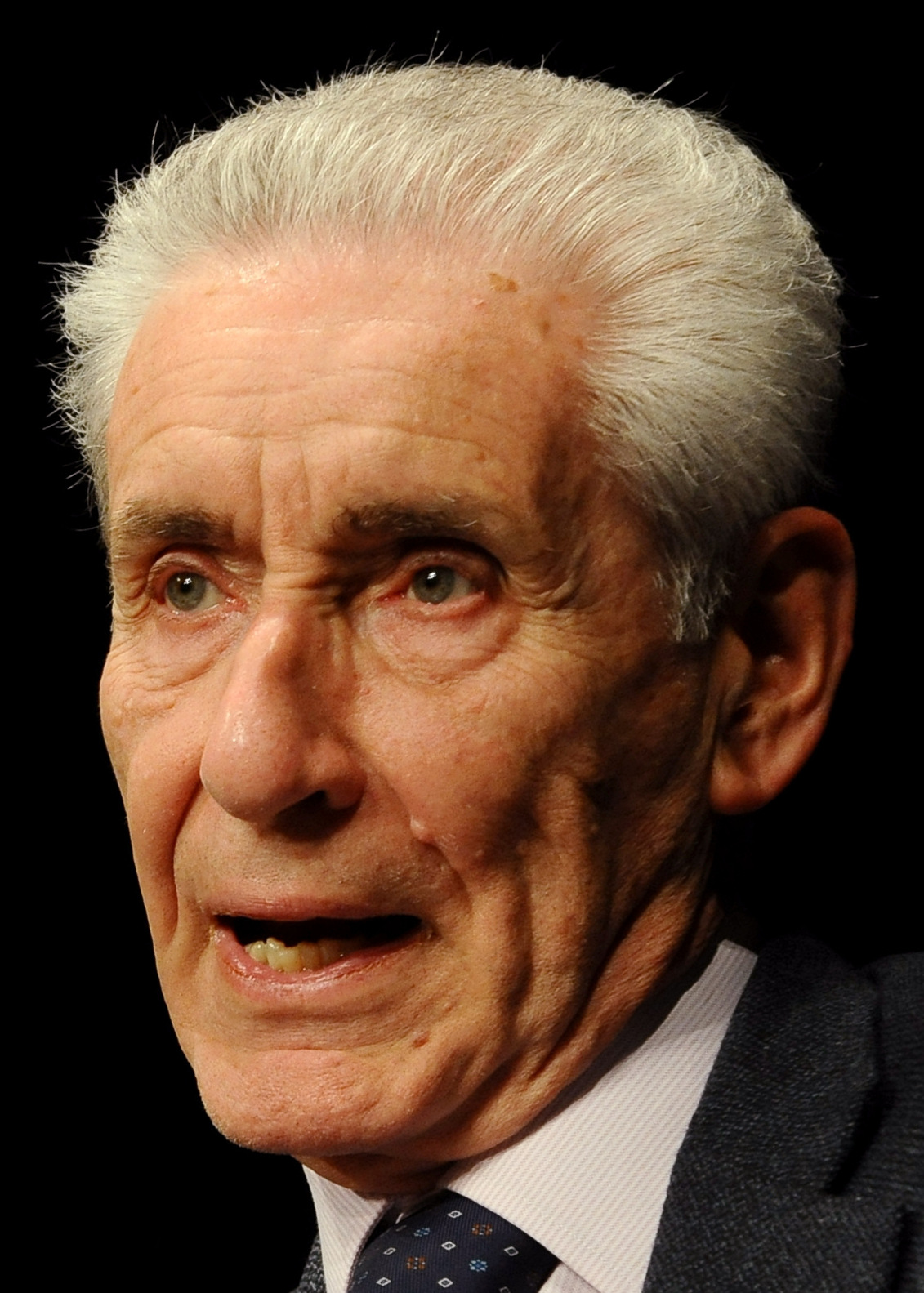
- Rodotà in 2013

Guarantor for the Protection of Personal Data
- In office 17 March 1997 – 18 April 2005
- Preceded by: Office established
- Succeeded by: Francesco Pizzetti

President of the Democratic Party of the Left
- In office 8 February 1991 – 30 April 1992
- Preceded by: Office established
- Succeeded by: Giglia Tedesco

Member of the Chamber of Deputies
- In office 20 June 1979 – 14 April 1994
- Constituency: Catanzaro (1979–1992); Florence (1992–1994)

Personal details
- Born: 30 May 1933 Cosenza, Italy
- Died: 23 June 2017 (aged 84) Rome, Italy
- Party: PR (before 1976); Independent Left (1976–1992); PDS (1992–1998); DS (1998–2007); Independent (2007–2017)
- Education: Sapienza University
- Occupation: University professor

Stefano Rodotà (30 May 1933 – 23 June 2017) was an Italian jurist and politician.

== Early life ==
Born in 1933 in Cosenza, to a middle-class family of Arbëreshë origin from San Benedetto Ullano, he attended Liceo classico Bernardino Telesio in his hometown and later the Sapienza University of Rome, where he graduated in 1955 under professor Emilio Betti, an Italian jurist, Roman Law scholar, philosopher and theologian, best known for his contributions to hermeneutics.

He was the brother of the engineer Antonio Rodotà and father of journalist Maria Laura Rodotà, a columnist for the daily newspaper Corriere della Sera.

== Academic career ==
Rodotà was accepted to Sapienza University of Rome's law school, where he graduated in 1955.

He then became Professor of Civil Law at the Sapienza University of Rome, where he was conferred the title of Emeritus.

As well as giving lectures and seminars at several universities in the United States, Canada, Australia, Latin America, and India, he was a visiting scholar at All Souls College in Oxford and Stanford Law School on a Fulbright grant. He later became a professor at the Pantheon-Sorbonne University Faculty of Law and collaborated with the Collège de France. Subsequently he was granted honorary degree by the Michel de Montaigne University Bordeaux 3 and the University of Macerata.

Rodotà was the Chairman of the Administrative Council of the International University College of Turin and also a committee member of the NEXA Center for Internet and Society a research center founded at the Department of Control and Computer Engineering of Polytechnic University of Turin.

== Political career ==
He joined the Radical Party led by Mario Pannunzio. In 1976 and in 1979 he refused to be a candidate for the Radical Party, then led by Marco Pannella. Instead, he was elected to the Parliament for the Independent Left, affiliated to the Italian Communist Party (PCI) becoming member of the Committee on Constitutional Affairs. He was re-elected in 1983 and elected as the president of the parliamentary group of the Independent Left.

He was selected as a Member of Parliament for the third time in 1987 and became a part of the first Bicameral Committee on institutional reform. In 1989 he became Shadow Minister of Justice in the Shadow Cabinet created by the Italian Communist Party led by Achille Occhetto. He joined Occhetto's Democratic Party of the Left (PDS) when it was formed and was proposed as their first presidential candidate.

In April 1992 he returned to Parliament for the fourth time, was elected as Vice President of the Chamber of Deputies and re-confirmed as a member of the new Bicameral Commission for institutional reforms. In May 1992 he stood in for Oscar Luigi Scalfaro as Speaker of the House during the last session of Parliament when it convened for the election of the Head of State, as Scalfaro was himself a candidate for the Quirinal Palace. At the end of the term in 1994, lasting only two years, Rodotà decided not to run again, preferring to return to university.

=== European Parliament ===
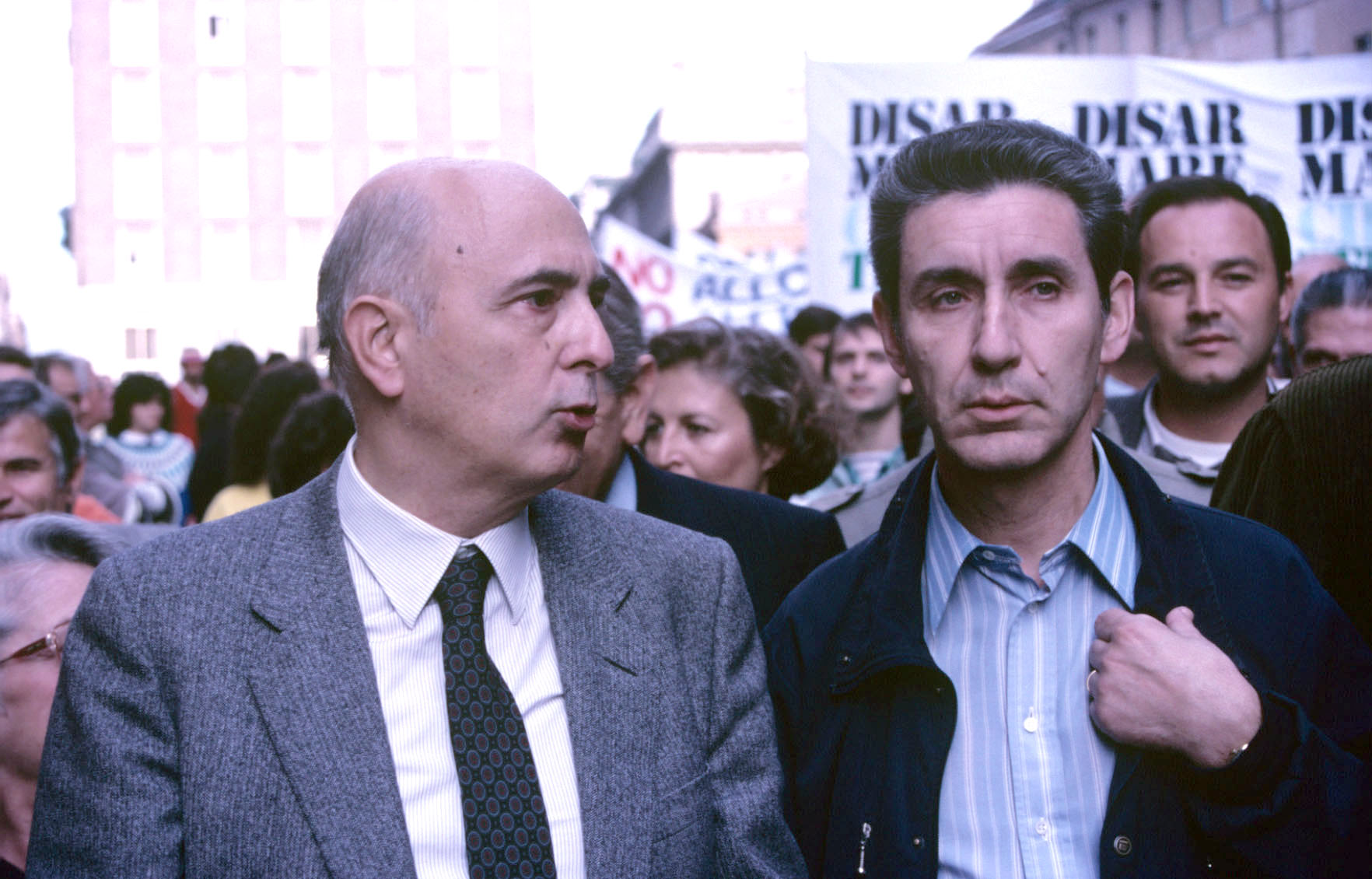
Rodotà with Giorgio Napolitano in 1986

From 1983 to 1994 he was a member of the Parliamentary Assembly of the Council of Europe, but it was only in 1989 that he was elected to the European Parliament. At this meeting, he participated in the writing of the Charter of Fundamental Rights of the European Union.

=== Bioethics institutions ===
He was a member of the "Group of Advisers on the Ethical Implications of Biotechnology" (from 1992 to 1997) and of the "European Group for Ethics in Science and New Technologies" (from 1997 to 2005), both appointed by the President of the European Commission. However his outstanding role in international bioethics never favoured his possible appointment as a member of the Italian National Bioethics Committee (CNB), owing to his lay position focused on the rights of self-determination and his criticism of the status of a committee as the CNB, appointed not by a pluralistic parliament, but by the government.

=== Italian institutions ===
From 1997 to 2005 he was the first President of the Italian Authority for the Protection of Personal data, while from 1998 to 2002 he chaired the Coordination Group of Trustees for the right to privacy of the European Union. He was also Chairman of the Article 29 Data Protection Working Party (2000-2004) and chairman of the scientific committee of the ' European Agency of Fundamental Rights (2007) and from 2008, he led the Law Festival in Piacenza.

In 2010, November 29 he presented to the Internet Governance Forum a proposal to bring in the Italian Constitutional Affairs Committee the adoption of new Article 21a. The article in question is as follows: "Everyone has an equal right to access the internet, on equal terms, in ways technologically appropriate, and remove all obstacles to economic and social order." In 2009 Rodotà drafted together with fellow jurists Alberto Lucarelli and Ugo Mattei the popular referendum to oppose water and other utilities privatisation. The referendum was overwhelmingly approved by over 26 million voters.

=== Candidate for President of Italy ===
In 2013 Rodotà became a candidate for the Presidency of the Republic, proposed by the Five Stars Movement and various appeals of civil society, also collected from several members of the Democratic Party and Left Ecology Freedom.

== University activities ==
Stefano Rodotà taught at the Universities of Macerata, Genoa and Rome, where he was professor of civil law and where he was awarded with the title of professor emeritus. He taught in many universities in Europe, in the United States of America, in Latin America, Canada, Australia and India. He was a visiting professor at the All Souls College in Oxford and Stanford School of Law. He taught at the Faculty of Law of the University Paris 1 Panthéon-Sorbonne and worked with the Collège de France. He received an honorary degree from Michel de Montaigne University of Bordeaux and the University of Macerata. He was chairman of the board of directors of the International University College of Turin. He was part of the Committee of the guarantors of the Democracy Biennial and the Nexa Center for Internet and Society of Politecnico di Torino.

=== Other offices and collaborations ===
He was an honorary member of the Association Hall Pass, which is responsible for the decriminalization of euthanasia. He was President of Lisli and Lelio Basso Foundation and in 2008 directed the Festival of Rights in Piacenza. In the publishing field, he directed "The right of agriculture" and the magazines "Politica del Diritto" (Politic of Right) and "Rivista critica del diritto privato" ("Magazine critique of private law"). He worked for several Italian newspapers and magazines, including Il Mondo, Nord e Sud, il Giorno, Panorama, Il Manifesto, L'Unità. He collaborated with the newspaper La Repubblica. In 2007 he was appointed by the Ministry of Justice of the last center-left Government to chair the Commission for the reform of the Italian Civil Code in the domain of public property. The commission, popularly known as Commissione Rodotà, is famous for its definition of the commons.

== Bibliography ==
Rodotà wrote many books and articles, which were translated into English, French, German, Spanish, and Portuguese.

- Il problema della responsabilità civile, Milano, Giuffrè, 1961; 1964.
- Le fonti di integrazione del contratto, Milano, Giuffrè, 1964; 1965; 1969.
- Il diritto privato nella società moderna, a cura di, Bologna, il Mulino, 1971; 1977.
- Elaboratori elettronici e controllo sociale, Bologna, il Mulino, 1973.
- Il controllo sociale delle attività private, a cura di, Bologna, il Mulino, 1977.
- Alla ricerca delle libertà, Bologna, il Mulino, 1978.
- Il terribile diritto. Studi sulla proprietà privata, Bologna, il Mulino, 1981; 1990. ISBN 88-15-02858-7.
- Repertorio di fine secolo, Roma-Bari, Laterza, 1992. ISBN 88-420-3913-6; 1999. ISBN 88-420-5859-9.
- Questioni di bioetica, a cura di, Roma-Bari, Laterza, 1993. ISBN 88-420-4304-4.
- Quale stato, Siena, Sisifo, 1994.
- Tecnologie e diritti, Bologna, il Mulino, 1995. ISBN 88-15-04855-3.
- Libertà e diritti in Italia. Dall'Unità ai giorni nostri, Roma, Donzelli, 1997. ISBN 88-7989-371-8.
- Tecnopolitica. La democrazia e le nuove tecnologie dell'informazione, Roma-Bari, Laterza, 1997. ISBN 88-420-5287-6; 2004. ISBN 88-420-7271-0.
- Intervista su privacy e libertà, Roma-Bari, Laterza, 2005. ISBN 88-420-7641-4.
- La vita e le regole. Tra diritto e non diritto, Milano, Feltrinelli, 2006. ISBN 88-07-10392-3; 2009. ISBN 978-88-07-72146-5.
- Ideologie e tecniche della riforma del diritto civile, Napoli, Editoriale scientifica, 2007. ISBN 978-88-95152-31-8.
- Dal soggetto alla persona, Napoli, Editoriale scientifica, 2007. ISBN 978-88-95152-54-7.
- Perché laico, Roma-Bari, Laterza, 2009. ISBN 978-88-420-8678-9; 2010. ISBN 978-88-420-9333-6.
- Che cos'è il corpo?, con CD, Roma, Sossella, 2010. ISBN 978-88-89829-63-9.
- Il nuovo habeas corpus: la persona costituzionalizzata e la sua autodeterminazione, in Trattato di biodiritto, I, Ambito e fonti del biodiritto, Milano, Giuffrè, 2010. ISBN 88-14-15909-2.
- Il corpo "giuridificato", in Trattato di biodiritto, Il governo del corpo, Milano, Giuffrè, 2011. ISBN 88-14-15902-5.
- Diritti e libertà nella storia d'Italia. Conquiste e conflitti 1861-2011, Roma, Donzelli, 2011. ISBN 978-88-6036-584-2.
- Elogio del moralismo, Roma-Bari, Laterza, 2011. ISBN 978-88-420-9889-8.
- Il diritto di avere diritti, Roma-Bari, Laterza, 2012. ISBN 978-88-420-9608-5.
- (presentation of) Democrazia senza partiti, Roma, Edizioni di Comunità, 2013 ISBN 978-88-98220-01-4.
- La rivoluzione della dignità, Napoli, La scuola di Pitagora, 2013. ISBN 978-88-6542-008-9.
- Il mondo nella rete. Quali i diritti, quali i vincoli., Roma-Bari, Laterza, 2014. ISBN 978-88-581-1165-9.
- Solidarietà. Un'utopia necessaria., Roma-Bari, Laterza, 2014. ISBN 978-88-581-1472-8.
- Diritto e giustizia: interroghiamo la Costituzione, introduzione di Franco Roberti, La scuola di Pitagora, 2015, ISBN 978-88-6542-433-9.
- Vivere la democrazia, Roma-Bari, Laterza, 2018. ISBN 978-88-581-3137-4.

Party political offices
Position established	President of the Democratic Party of the Left; 1991–1992	Succeeded by Giglia Tedesco Tatò
