= 2026 Italian constitutional referendum =

- 22–23 March 2026
- "Do you approve the text of the law revising Articles 87, paragraph 10, 102, paragraph 1, 104, 105, 106, paragraph 3, 107, paragraph 1, and 110 of the Constitution, approved by Parliament and published in the Official Gazette no. 253 of 30 October 2025 under the title Provisions Governing the Judicial System and the Establishment of the Disciplinary Court?"

Results
Choice	Votes	%
Yes	13,250,709	46.76%
No	15,085,410	53.24%
Valid votes	28,336,119	98.94%
Invalid or blank votes	304,104	1.06%
Total votes	28,640,223	100.00%
Eligible to vote/turnout	51,425,745	55.69%
- Results by province and diaspora

A constitutional referendum concerning the reform of the judicial system was held in Italy on 22 and 23 March 2026. Its purpose was to revise Title II and Title IV of Part II of the Italian constitution. It was the fifth constitutional referendum in the history of the Italian Republic.

Voters were asked whether they approved a constitutional law, often called the "Nordio Reform" (Riforma Nordio) after Minister of Justice Carlo Nordio, that would amend the Italian Constitution in various aspects, most notably by proposing the constitutional separation of career paths between judges and public prosecutors, the splitting of the High Council of the Judiciary (CSM) into two distinct bodies, and the selection of CSM members by sortition rather than traditional election, as well as the establishment of a High Disciplinary Court to oversee disciplinary proceedings.

The government-initiated constitutional bill was approved by the Senate of the Republic on 30 October 2025. Since it did not reach the qualified two-thirds majority in each chamber of the Italian Parliament during the parliamentary approval process, pursuant to Article 138 of the Italian Constitution, the necessary signatures were soon collected to request a confirmatory constitutional referendum.

In a higher-than-expected turnout and in contrast to late polls showing a close election, after earlier polls had initially shown a significant advantage for those in favour, voters rejected the constitutional reform 53.2% to 46.8%. This was seen as a significant blow to the Meloni government. A quorum was not required for the referendum to be valid, and the Nordio law submitted to referendum would have been promulgated if confirmed by a majority of valid votes.

== Background ==
=== Details of the reform ===
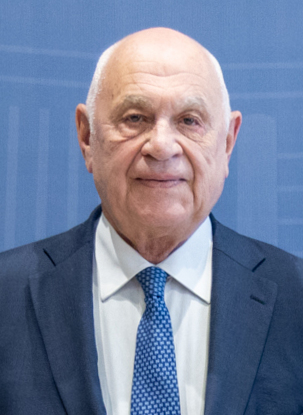
Carlo Nordio, the Minister of Justice after whom the reform was named

The constitutional law, published on 30 October 2025 in the General Series No. 253 of the Official Gazette (Gazzetta Ufficiale), pursuant to Article 138 of the Constitution, was subject to a constitutional referendum as it was approved without the required two-thirds majority; on 16 July 2025, the Senate of the Republic had approved the eight articles of the reform. The constitutional reform, promoted by the government of Giorgia Meloni, would have introduced structural amendments to Articles 87, 102, 104, 105, 106, 107, and 110 of the Constitution of the Italian Republic, with the complete replacement of Articles 104 and 105, and would have required the constitutional separation of the careers of judicial magistrates (judges) and prosecutorial magistrates (public prosecutors), as well as the division of the CSM (Consiglio Superiore della Magistratura), the self-governing body of the Italian judiciary, into a Judicial CSM and a Prosecutorial CSM, each responsible for the career management of judicial and prosecutorial magistrates respectively.

The reform would have replaced the elective system for selecting CSM members with a random selection mechanism for the members of the two councils according to two different procedures: the "lay members" (one third of the total) would have been drawn by lot from a list of full university professors in legal disciplines and lawyers with at least fifteen years of professional practice, compiled by the Italian Parliament in joint session through election; the judicial members (two thirds of the total) would have been drawn by lot from among judicial magistrates and prosecutorial magistrates. A subsequent ordinary law would have been entrusted with determining the number of members of the two Councils and the detailed procedures for the drawing of lots.

The reform would have established the High Disciplinary Court (Alta Corte Disciplinare), which would have assumed disciplinary jurisdiction over ordinary magistrates, removing this function from the disciplinary section of the CSM that exercises it. The High Disciplinary Court was to be composed of fifteen members: three appointed by the president of Italy from among full university professors in legal disciplines and lawyers with at least twenty years of professional practice; three drawn by lot from a list of individuals with the same qualifications compiled by Parliament in joint session through election; six judicial magistrates and three prosecutorial magistrates drawn by lot from among members of the respective categories with at least twenty years of judicial service who perform or have performed functions at the Supreme Court of Cassation level. The High Disciplinary Court would have elected its president from among the judges appointed by the president of the Republic or drawn from the list compiled by Parliament. Appeals against decisions of the High Disciplinary Court, including on the merits, would have been admissible solely before the same High Disciplinary Court. A subsequent ordinary law would have been tasked with defining disciplinary offenses and corresponding sanctions, specifying the composition of the panels, regulating the disciplinary procedure, and establishing the rules necessary for the functioning of the High Disciplinary Court.

=== Text of the referendum question and signatures collection ===
On 18 November 2025, the Central Referendum Office of the Supreme Court of Cassation, with an order notified on 19 November, admitted four requests for a constitutional referendum and set the question.

Approvate il testo della legge costituzionale concernente "Norme in materia di ordinamento giurisdizionale e di istituzione della Corte disciplinare" approvato dal Parlamento e pubblicato nella Gazzetta Ufficiale n. 253 del 30 ottobre 2025?

— Italian original of the referendum question

Do you approve the text of the constitutional law concerning "Provisions Governing the Judicial System and the Establishment of the Disciplinary Court", approved by Parliament and published in the Official Gazette no. 253 of 30 October 2025?

— English translation of the original referendum question

Ballot paper of the referendum

On 6 February 2026, the Supreme Court of Cassation granted the request for a question containing further details on the articles of the Italian Constitution affected by the reform being proposed in the referendum, initially promoted through a petition by a group of anonymous activists, called the Committee of 15 Citizens, represented by the lawyer Carlo Guglielmi, specialised in labour law and affiliated with the Unione Sindacale di Base (USB); the Committee of 15 Citizens had reached the 500,000 signatures necessary for the official filing of the request with the Supreme Court of Cassation on 15 January. Also on 6 February, the Central Referendum Office of the Supreme Court of Cassation, following the request for a referendum made by 546,343 voters, issued a special ordinance admitting the new text of the referendum question, which was then authorised by the Council of Ministers and by President Sergio Mattarella.

Approvate il testo della legge di revisione degli artt. 87, decimo comma, 102, primo comma, 104, 105, 106, terzo comma, 107, primo comma, e 110 della Costituzione approvata dal Parlamento e pubblicata nella Gazzetta Ufficiale del 30 ottobre 2025 con il titolo "Norme in materia di ordinamento giurisdizionale e di istituzione della Corte disciplinare"?

— Italian original of the modified referendum question

Do you approve the text of the law revising Articles 87, paragraph 10, 102, paragraph 1, 104, 105, 106, paragraph 3, 107, paragraph 1, and 110 of the Constitution, approved by Parliament and published in the Official Gazette no. 253 of 30 October 2025 under the title "Provisions Governing the Judicial System and the Establishment of the Disciplinary Court"?

— English translation of the modified referendum question

== Debate ==
=== Criticism ===
"This reorganisation of the office and role of the public prosecutor, partly planned for some time, would impact the independence of the entire judicial system, as the judge would be called upon to rule only on cases selected by the government. Those who rely solely on the text of the constitutional reform as a guarantee against the risks denounced by the 'Right to Say No' committee, without considering the aforementioned context, are reminiscent of a character from Manzoni's novel, Don Ferrante, who died of the plague, a disease he didn't believe in because it was incompatible with Aristotelian principles."

— Aniello Nappi

The reform and the referendum gave rise to a debate. Critics of the reform generally argued that it did not tackle the real issues of Italian justice, and would not make justice more efficient or just as claimed by some supporters, and that it was not democratic as it would eliminate the right of magistrates to freely elect their representatives in the CSM. They further argued that the public prosecutor would become a "super policeman" rather than an impartial one, who must seek the judicial truth and exculpatory evidence (Article 358 of the Italian Code of Criminal Procedure), that the separation of careers was irrelevant as they would account for less than one percent of all magistrates and that the Cartabia Reform already applied a separation of career, and that it would represent the end of the principle that "the law is the same for everyone" (la legge è uguale per tutti).

Critics, including among others Marco Travaglio, negatively compared the proposed reform to the United States justice system, arguing that the prosecutor, who is not "the prosecution's lawyer" but "the citizen's first defender" (a magistrate "with the obligation to seek the truth, just like a judge"), and that by transforming him into a separate figure, the new type of prosecutor under the reform "will inevitably be trained to be a policeman, that is, to accuse without considering whether someone is innocent or guilty", and that "our trial system risks becoming like that in the US, where the jury decides not who is guilty and who is innocent, but who has the best lawyer." Prominent judge and jurist Gustavo Zagrebelsky described the reform as "a retaliation by certain politicians against certain judiciaries to shift the constitutional balance in favour of the former's impunity and to the detriment of the latter's autonomy and independence".

Another argument, represented by the anti-mafia magistrate Raffaele Cantone, was that judges were at the same time accused of lacking independence from prosecutors and thus supporting the prosecution's arguments, and of excessive garantism when rejecting the prosecution, for example when releasing suspects. The latter criticism was shared by Gian Domenico Caiazza (chairman of a pro-reform committee) in reference to Matteo Salvini's public messaging in the aftermath of a clash between a minority of violent protesters and the police in Turin. Cantone also observed that criminal justice is on the one hand accused of lacking effectiveness, blaming magistrates for direct consequences for public safety, and on the other hand is accused of being too "invasive" with respect to politics. 2021 data showed that first-instance acquittals were equal to 50%, a percentage that rises to 69.7% for trials held following opposition to a criminal conviction by the prosecutor, with critics suggesting that sharing the same order does not impact or condition judicial decisions.

Critics, even among those in favour of the career separation, cited the lack of discussion between the government and the opposition in writing the reform, and those who voted against the reform in Parliament, such as Pier Ferdinando Casini, described it as "useless". Others also argued that the career separation was bad because the prosecutors should be trained as judges as in the Italian system the goal of both prosecutors and judges is to reach the judicial truth, with the prosecutors free to request the acquittal of the defendant; data showed that around 50% of the time judges acquit defendants in cases where the prosecutor had requested a trial. Additionally, the magistrate would no longer be able to appeal to the Supreme Court of Cassation against a decision by the High Disciplinary Court and would not be granted the three-degrees of judgement; instead the magistrate could only appeal the decision to the same High Disciplinary Court, albeit it would not be composed of the same judicial panel. Finally, critics cited the high cost of the reform when the same amount of spending could be used to hire more magistrates and digitalise the system, that no country use sortition and that it would be "a genuine humiliation of the democratic rules and constitutional principles on active and passive suffrage", citing the board of the Union of the Italian Criminal Chambers (UCPI) in 2019 but that was in favour of the 2025 reform, and also observed that there were unclear aspects due to the fact that part of the reform would require ordinary laws for its functioning, in particular the organisation of the new bodies.

Critics did not see the Nordio Reform as a justice reform but as a magistrature reform that the government was seeking to control politically, and it would lead towards illiberalism and authoritarianism, citing the abolition of the crime of abuse of office, the weakening of the Court of Audit and the crime of influence peddling, a de facto penal populism (giustizialismo) through various repressive decrees and laws establishing new crimes under the guise of "law and order" and security decrees, and the direct election of the prime minister (premierato). Critics also argued that the separation of career was part of a reform project that marked the history of the Italian Republic between the mid-1960s and the early 1980s, having already been envisaged in the "Democratic Rebirth Plan" drawn up by Licio Gelli and Propaganda Due (P2), a criminal Masonic lodge with far-right and neo-fascist links involved through Gelli as the instigator of the Bologna station massacre, and that in turn was consubstantial with the various attempts at subversion, such as the Borghese coup, the Piano Solo, and the "strategy of tension". Gelli's son, Maurizio Gelli, said that Meloni's government was implementing many of his father's ideas, including the separation of careers, psycho-aptitude tests for magistrates, and presidentialism.

=== Response ===
"It's shameful to forget that the idea of separating careers originated within the history of the Italian left ... Giuliano Vassalli, in presenting the 1988 accusatory reform of the code to the foreign press, explained that it was a wonderful reform, but that without revising the Constitution and the judicial system by dividing careers, it would be nullified. Unfortunately, he was a good prophet ... the Bicameral Commission chaired by Massimo D'Alema placed great emphasis on separating careers, and the Democratic Party, during Maurizio Martina's leadership, also shared the same opinion."

— Gian Domenico Caiazza

Supporters generally responded that the career separation is typical of liberal democracy, while the unitary system is typical of authoritarian regimes. They also argued that if de facto there already is a career separation with the Cartabia Reform, there should be no issue in making it de jure, and observed that the text of the reform would maintain the same wording about the autonomy and independence of the magistrature, that the public prosecutors would not be put under the executive and would still be bound by Article 358 of the Code of Criminal Procedure requiring the prosecutor to also seek evidence in favour of the defendant. Another line of argument was that the reform would make the judiciary more efficient and just, by providing a truly impartial judge and that the prosecutor would also be more impartial, and that by reducing political factionalism within the CSM, the reform would make the magistrature more independent. The argument was that judges are not truly independent because they are judged by a CSM with a strong presence of investigating magistrates (prosecutors), also citing 5,933 wrongful detentions from 2017 to 2024 that costed the state €254 million in compensation.

Supporters observed that the reform was different by the ones proposed by Gelli, former Prime Minister and Italian Socialist Party (PSI) leader Bettino Craxi, and Silvio Berlusconi, and that the career separation was proposed by the centre-left coalition in the 1990s under Massimo D'Alema and in the late 2010s during the secretary of Maurizio Martina, and that it would be in line with the 1988 reform of the Code of Criminal Procedure, which moved the Italian system from a traditionally inquisitorial system to a more adversial or accusatorial system and bore the name of the PSI jurist Giuliano Vassalli. Supporters of the reform criticised their opponents for engaging in what they saw as fearmongering by postulating that the reform would lead towards illiberalism and authoritarianism. They cited as evidence left-wing individuals who came out in support of the reform and publicly expressed their favourable vote in the referendum. Supporters of the reforms lamented that "blacklists" circulated in WhatsApp chats among magistrates opposed to the reform, criticising constitutionalists who came in favour of the reform.

Supporters, particularly those of the centre-right coalition and within the Meloni government, often claim a political bias or argue that the magistrature is politicised, an allegation dating back to the Berlusconi era, where he often adopted red-baiting rhetoric by attacking magistrates as "communists" or with the epithet "red robes" (toghe rosse), the latter an expression still used by the Italian right. In an official statement on 21 December 2024, in response to the sentences handed down by judges against senators Matteo Renzi and Salvini, the UCPI stated that there had been a "political use of the judicial system by the judiciary", that such use had "subversive overtones", and therefore hoped to "put an end to this trend through a comprehensive constitutional reform of the judiciary". In January 2026, the "Pannella Sciascia Tortora Committee", promoted by the Transnational Radical Party (PRT) to support the referendum on the separation of judicial careers, was reported to have filed a complaint against the leaders of the "Right to Say No" committee, accusing them of the misdemeanor offense under Article 656 of the Criminal Code ("publication or dissemination of false, exaggerated, or biased news, capable of disturbing public order") for promoting the dissemination of a propaganda poster reading: "Would you like judges who depend on politicians? No. With the Nordio law, politicians want to control the decisions of magistrates. VOTE NO IN THE REFERENDUM."

=== Concerns about the reform's effects ===
The view that the government sought to politically control the magistrature was notably held by historian Alessandro Barbero, who was criticised by fact-checkers for a number of misleading claims; while they found that he presented a fairly accurate summary of the Italian justice system, they found that the text of the reform did not reflect the issues presented by Barbero. In particular, they found that Barbero's criticism was essentially valid for past proposed judicial reforms such as that of Berlusconi but did not fit the Nordio reform. In turn, there was a controversy about censorship as his video was removed by Facebook. Fact-checkers denied that it was a censorship, stated that they verify the facts, not the opinions, and clarified that while Barbero's criticism was not factual, his view that the reform risks leading towards illiberalism or authoritarianism (through the political control of the magistrature) represented a legitimate political opinion that cannot be presently verified as it was a prediction about the reform's effects, and that the video should not have been removed by Facebook.

Others rejected the textualist argument adopted by fact-checkers and argued that context was important, and the perceived fearmongering was in fact legitimate or even justified, citing the statements by the government ministers, who appeared to suggest that the reason of the reform was to better control the magistrature, which it accused of an alleged political bias and interference, after courts rejected several of the government's key proposals. On 30 October 2025, Meloni, after denouncing "yet another act of invasion of jurisdiction over the decisions of the government and Parliament", stated that "the constitutional reform of the justice system and the reform of the Court of Auditors, soon to be approved by the Senate, are the most appropriate response to this intrusiveness, which will not halt the government's action." In a speech to the National Council of Lawyers, Alfredo Mantovano denounced "the courts' tendency to deny regulatory space to the legislature", which he said eroded the scope for direct expression of popular sovereignty, adding: "Today, there is a block on expulsions thanks to judicial decisions, there is a block on security, on industrial policy that seeks to achieve certain objectives—think of the Ilva steelworks—thanks to judicial decisions. This is an invasion of the field that must be addressed." On 22 November 2025, Salvini described the decision by the Juvenile Court of L'Aquila to remove six- and eight-year-old children from their parents in the "family in the woods" case as a "kidnapping". Nordio himself stated that the phenomenon of the alleged invasion of judicial power was not unique to Italy but also concerned other countries. In January 2026, Meloni made a statement on the April 2026 Hungarian parliamentary election, calling on Hungarian voters to confirm the government of Viktor Orbán; according to a European Union report, Orbán's government severely reduced the independence of judges, so much so that the European Commission decided to suspend funds destined for Hungary due to violations of the rule of law, including those related to the independence of the judiciary.

=== Carlo Nordio's statements ===
In support of their arguments, critics of the reform cited statements by Nordio himself that they say are a "confession" of the real intention behind the reform and that justifies their concerns. Cited statements by Nordio included that the reform would be useful for the opposition if they were to return to government ("It amazes me that an intelligent person like Elly Schlein doesn't understand that this reform would also benefit them, if they were to take office") and that just because Gelli supported the career separation, this did not entail that the reform was automatically bad ("I don't know P2's plan. I can say that if Mr. Licio Gelli's interpretation, or rather his opinion, was correct, there's no reason why it shouldn't be followed because he said so. Truths don't depend on who proclaims them, but on the objectivity they represent ... If Gelli said that Jesus died on the cross, that doesn't mean we should say he died of pneumonia, or that a broken clock tells the right time twice a day. Even if Gelli stumbled over the truth, that doesn't mean the truth is no longer the truth"), which was described as a gaffe. In February 2026, Nordio stated that the reform "will not and must not have political effects" and that if those in favour of the reform were to win the referendum, there would be a dialogue with the magistrature.

On 9 March 2026, the Ministry of Justice chief of staff Giusi Bartolozzi controversially called on voters to vote in favour of the reform "so we can get rid of the judiciary, which is [like] firing squads", and added that "I'm running away... I have an ongoing investigation. I'm running away from this country", if the reform was rejected, receiving criticism from the opposition, as well as the government; however, unlike the opposition, it refused to call for her resignation. Nordio apologised and later stated that Bartolozzi had already clarified that she was referring to "a small portion of politicised judges" and that she would "certainly have no difficulty apologising for words that I am sure don't reflect her thoughts and the esteem she has for the judiciary, of which, among other things, she herself is a part." Bartolazzi also explained that the comparison with firing squads was because it "alluded to the state of absolute prostration one finds oneself in when involved in a trial, especially if innocent. Effects that no acquittal can erase."

Simonetta Matone, a former magistrate and member of the Chamber of Deputies, criticised Nordio for causing the reform to lose support with "crazy statements", and said that he confused "what can be said in a living room with what can be said publicly". She added: "We all think the things he said, but they're things we can't say publicly because we've given the green light to a resurgence of the No front." In particular, she criticised the comparison made by Nordio between the CSM and "a para-mafia system", a statement he made a few days earlier.

=== Sensationalism and misleading claims ===
Both sides of the debate engaged in some form of sensationalism or made misleading claims. Notably, Naples public prosecutor Nicola Gratteri made misleading claims about anti-mafia magistrates Paolo Borsellino and Giovanni Falcone, citing quotes by Borsellino and Falcone in interviews that never took place and again citing a real quote by Falcone expressing opposition to the career separation but decontexualising it. Among the first to express doubts about the veridicity of the quotes was the journalist Damiano Aliprandi, who wrote for Il Dubbio an article about it, and in turn La Notizia, which had published an article in July 2025 reporting the quotes, issued a retraction. In response, Il Foglio journalist Luciano Capone said that Gratteri, whom he described as a "frontman of the 'No' vote in the referendum", had read "a fake interview with Giovanni Falcone against career separation: one of those memes circulating on Facebook and WhatsApp, sometimes on Il Fatto", and joked: "If he verifies the evidence like this as a prosecutor, we're screwed." As observed by Capone and as found by fact-checkers, the fake quotes dated back to the summer of 2025 and appeared in Facebook groups and were shared as meme.

On 13 November 2025, Il Fatto Quotidiano editor-in-chief Marco Travaglio issued a retraction, stating: "When we're wrong, unlike the hoaxers who deliberately tell twenty lies a day, we apologise to our readers. And we do so today for having accepted at face value two incorrect quotes from Falcone and Borsellino, taken from written and online publications." Former Turin prosecutor Armando Spataro shared Gratteri's views, stating that Falcone himself underwent a change of career by switching from judge to prosecutor. Fact-checkers observed that it was misleading to claim that Borsellino and Falcone were either for or against the career separation as the judicial system they worked in was significantly different, that Falcone did not discuss the career separation as a magistrate, and that he was a member of a Political faction within the CSM, narrowly losing the presidency by 13 votes. Among the other misleading claims was that the reform would avert cases of miscarriage of justice or so that as stated by Meloni from the stage of Atreju, calling for voting in favour of the justice reform, "there never will be another shameful case" like the Garlasco case, described by fact-checkers as "one of the most controversial legal cases of the last twenty years".

== Campaign ==
Unlike other types that are abrogative, the justice reform referendum was confirmatory, meaning that the law would come into force only if the popular vote was in favour, and thus there was no campaign in favour of abstention as parties ran a campaign to get out the vote.

=== Support ===
Although the majority centre-right coalition government in Parliament generally supported the reform, the governing parties did not organise a unified effort in favour of the reform. Meloni's Brothers of Italy (FdI) notably avoided using its party symbol in its promotional materials, unlike the League (Lega) and Forza Italia (FI), which maintained their traditional branding. Lega launched the campaign with the slogan "I Vote Yes – The Reform that Brings Justice". Us Moderates (NM) and the Associative Movement of Italians Abroad (MAIE) established the Committee for the Yes. FI leaders, such as Joseph William Catalano in Forlì, campaigned in honour of Berlusconi, stating that justice reform "precisely because it affects the citizen's identity and freedom, was for Silvio Berlusconi, and it is for us today, the reform of reforms" and that it would "finally realise Silvio Berlusconi's great dream", and called for an open debate "without ideological barriers".

The Liberal Democratic Party (PLD) of Luigi Marattin, a former member of the PD and Italia Viva (IV), became the first political party to formally establish a pro-reform committee named "Justice Yes". Action party leader Carlo Calenda also came out in support, describing it as a good reform. Other parties expressed their favourable vote in the referendum despite flaws in the reform, and criticism of Meloni's rhetoric, reflecting their liberal, libertarian, and garantist views, with some speculating about what prominent socialist figure Bettino Craxi would think of it. Similarly, on the opposite side, there were those who expressed criticism of the magistrature and Italian justice but nonetheless expressed their vote against the reform in the referendum, and those who generally agreed with the reform but would vote against it in the referendum as a political act against the Meloni government, as was also argued by Nordio.

Several independent committees emerged in support of the constitutional changes. The "Yes to the Reform" committee was chaired by constitutional judge Nicolò Zanon, with journalist Alessandro Sallusti serving as spokesperson. The group included individuals affiliated with or formerly involved in FdI, Lega, and FI. The Luigi Einaudi Foundation launched the committee "Yes to Separation", presided over by lawyer Gian Domenico Caiazza and supported by various figures, such as Matteo Hallissey, former magistrate Antonio Di Pietro, former senator Andrea Cangini, and historian Ernesto Galli della Loggia. In July 2025, the UCPI had already established its own committee to back the reform. Notably, some figures traditionally associated with the centre-left coalition endorsed the "Yes" campaign, including former Italian Communist Party deputy and Constitutional Court of Italy former president Augusto Barbera, as did Francesca Scopelliti, the partner of Enzo Tortora, who was a well-known victim of a miscarriage of justice, and other prominent constitutionalists, such as Giulio Prosperetti and Nicolò Zanon. The association Libertà Eguale formed the committee "The Left That Votes Yes" led by Barbera, the former PD deputy Stefano Ceccanti, and the former minister Cesare Salvi, who opposed the broader left-wing decision to campaign against the reform. Additionally, Fabrizio Cicchitto, together with former ministers Claudio Signorile and Salvo Andò, launched the "Giuliano Vassalli Committee for Yes". On 21 January 2026, the "Populars for Yes" committee was established, chaired by constitutional scholar Giulio Prosperetti, further expanding the network of organisations advocating in favour of the constitutional reform.

=== Opposition ===
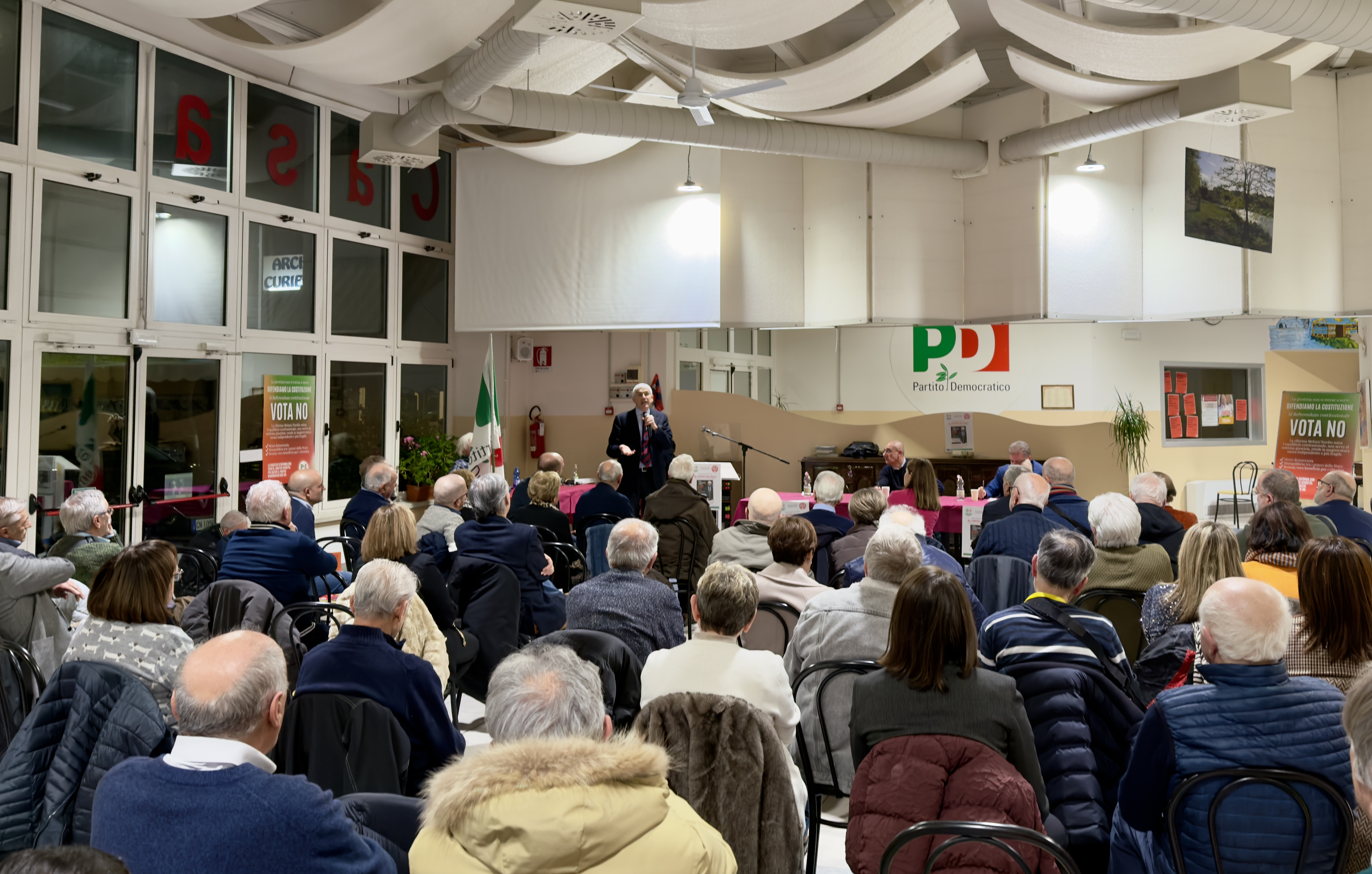
A "No" meeting in Bologna with senator Pier Ferdinando Casini

The Democratic Party (PD) officially launched its campaign in favour of a "No" vote in the constitutional referendum on 24 January 2026, adopting the slogan "Vote No to defend the Constitution". The Five Star Movement (M5S) similarly structured its opposition campaign around the slogan "Vote No to the Save-the-Political-Elite Referendum", portraying the reform as a measure designed to protect the Meloni government's powers. The Green and Left Alliance (AVS) also criticised the constitutional reform, accusing it of aiming to concentrate excessive powers in the hands of the government. Extra-parliamentary parties soon started collecting signatures to reach the goal of 500,000 in order to have a longer electoral campaign. Alongside political parties, several civil society groups and professional organisations formed committees to oppose the reform. On 18 November 2025, the "Right to Say No" committee began its campaign under the leadership of the National Association of Magistrates (ANM), with constitutional law professor Enrico Grosso as its head. This was followed on 10 December 2025 by the creation of "Lawyers for No", a committee launched by a group of attorneys and chaired by Franco Moretti.

On 10 January 2026, a broader coalition of organisations inaugurated the committee "Civil Society for No in the Constitutional Referendum" (bringing together "associations, jurists, and citizens to defend the Constitution, the autonomy of the judiciary, and oppose the Nordio Law, differentiated autonomy, and the premierate"), and Scientific Council of the "Civil Society Committee for the No" was established. In addition to joining the anti-reform committee, around 117 constitutional scholars joined its Scientific Committee, including three presidents emeritus of the Constitutional Court of Italy (Ugo De Siervo, Gaetano Silvestri, and Zagrebelsky) and a former vice president (Enzo Cheli). This group included among others the trade union CGIL, the anti-mafia association Libera, the National Association of Italian Partisans (ANPI), and the environmental organisation Legambiente. The committee was presided over by former deputy Giovanni Bachelet and supported by physicist and Nobel laureate Giorgio Parisi. In parallel with its campaigning activities, the committee also promoted a signature collection in support of the referendum process.

Several public intellectuals took positions in the debate. On 18 January 2026, Alessandro Barbero publicly announced his opposition to the reform in a video message explaining his reasons. On 23 January, the video was removed by Meta Platforms, prompting the PD to submit a parliamentary inquiry addressed to Prime Minister Meloni regarding the episode. Opposition to the reform was further expressed by local government representatives. More than 150 mayors signed an appeal promoted by Italian Local Autonomies and the Civil Society for No committee. Among the signatories were prominent city leaders such as Roberto Gualtieri of Rome, Gaetano Manfredi of Naples, Stefano Lo Russo of Turin, Matteo Lepore of Bologna, Sara Funaro of Florence, Silvia Salis of Genoa, Massimo Zedda of Cagliari, and Vittoria Ferdinandi of Perugia. In February 2026, after the neo-fascist CasaPound came out in support of the reform, the PD took advantage of this to further their defence of the anti-fascist Constitution, sparking criticism among its own ranks from those who supported the reform and are anti-fascists.

== Positions ==
=== Political parties ===
Choice	Political party	Political orientation	Leader	Ref.
Yes	Brothers of Italy (FdI)	National conservatism	Giorgia Meloni	
Yes	League (Lega)	Right-wing populism	Matteo Salvini	
Yes	Forza Italia (FI)	Liberal conservatism	Antonio Tajani	
Yes	Action (Az)	Liberalism	Carlo Calenda	
Yes	Us Moderates (NM)	Liberal conservatism	Maurizio Lupi	
Yes	National Future (FN)	Nationalism	Roberto Vannacci	
Yes	More Europe (+E)	Liberalism	Riccardo Magi	
Yes	Coraggio Italia (CI)	Liberal conservatism	Luigi Brugnaro	
Yes	Associative Movement Italians Abroad (MAIE)	Italians abroad interests	Ricardo Antonio Merlo	
Yes	Union of the Centre (UdC)	Christian democracy	Antonio De Poli	
Yes	Fassa Association (AF)	Christian democracy	Luca Guglielmi	
Yes	Christian Democracy (DC)	Christian democracy	Raffaele De Rosa	
Yes	Christian Democracy with Rotondi (DCR)	Christian democracy	Gianfranco Rotondi	
Yes	New Italian Socialist Party (NPSI)	Social democracy	Stefano Caldoro	
Yes	Liberal Democratic Party (PLD)	Liberalism	Luigi Marattin	
Yes	Italian Radicals (RI)	Liberalism	Filippo Blengino	
Yes	South calls North (ScN)	Regionalism	Cateno De Luca	
Yes	Valdostan Union (UV)	Regionalism	Joël Farcoz	(Note: While the party expressed its favourable vote in the referendum, it gave freedom of vote.)
Yes	Christian Democracy (DC)	Christian democracy	Gianpiero Samorì	
Yes	Movement for Autonomy (MpA)	Regionalism	Raffaele Lombardo	
Yes	Italian Socialist Party (PSI)	Social democracy	Enzo Maraio	
Yes	Die Freiheitlichen (dF)	Separatism	Roland Stauder	
Yes	JWA List	Separatism	Jürgen Wirth Anderlan	
Yes	Liga Veneta Repubblica (LVR)	Regionalism	Fabrizio Comencini	
Yes	Moderates	Liberalism	Giacomo Portas	
Yes	Popular Alternative (AP)	Conservatism	Stefano Bandecchi	
Yes	Sovereign Popular Democracy (DSP)	Populism	Marco Rizzo	
Yes	New Force (FN)	Neo-fascism	Roberto Fiore	
Yes	The People of the Family (PdF)	Social conservatism	Mario Adinolfi	
Yes	Independence	Ultraconservatism	Gianni Alemanno	
Yes	Now! (ORA!)	Radical centrism	Michele Boldrin	
Yes	Italian Liberal Party (PLI)	Liberalism	Stefano De Luca	
Yes	Italian Republican Party (PRI)	Liberalism	Corrado De Rinaldis Saponaro	
Yes	Social Democracy (SD)	Social democracy	Umberto Costi	
No official position	Italia Viva (IV)	Liberalism	Matteo Renzi	
No official position	South Tyrolean People's Party (SVP)	Regionalism	Dieter Steger	
No official position	South Tyrolean Freedom (STF)	Separatism	Sven Knoll	
No official position	Edelweiss (SA)	Regionalism	Ronny Bobey	
No	Democratic Party (PD)	Social democracy	Elly Schlein	
No	Five Star Movement (M5S)	Populism	Giuseppe Conte	
No	Green Europe (EV)	Green politics	Angelo Bonelli	
No	Italian Left (SI)	Democratic socialism	Nicola Fratoianni	
No	Campobase	Regionalism	Chiara Maule	
No	Centrists for Europe (CpE)	Christian democracy	Pier Ferdinando Casini	
No	Democratic Centre (CD)	Christian left	Bruno Tabacci	
No	Solidary Democracy (DemoS)	Christian left	Paolo Ciani	
No	Progressive Party (PP)	Progressivism	Massimo Zedda	
No	Greens of South Tyrol (Grüne)	Green politics	Luca Bertolini, Elide Mussner	
No	Team K (TK)	Liberalism	Paul Köllensperger	
No	Future Left (SF)	Democratic socialism	Luca Pizzuto	
No	Us of the Centre (NDC)	Christian democracy	Clemente Mastella	
No	Building Democracy (CD)	Regionalism	Massimo Romano	
No	Communist Refoundation Party (PRC)	Communism	Maurizio Acerbo	
No	Power to the People (PaP)	Left-wing populism	Marta Collot, Giuliano Granato	
No	Possible (Pos)	Social democracy	Francesca Druetti	
No	Volt Italy (Volt)	Eurofederalism	Daniela Patti	
No	Democracy and Autonomy (DemA)	Left-wing populism	Luigi de Magistris	
No	Communist Party (PC)	Communism	Alberto Lombardo	
No	Workers' Communist Party (PCL)	Communism	Marco Ferrando	
No	Italian Communist Party (PCI)	Communism	Mauro Alboresi	
No	Party of the South (PdS)	Meridionalism	Natale Cuccurese	

=== Trade unions ===
Choice	Trade union	Leader	Ref.
No official position	Italian Confederation of Trades Unions (CISL)	Daniela Fumarola	(Note: The CISL did not give any indication of vote and instead called for participation to the referendum.)
No	Italian General Confederation of Labour (CGIL)	Maurizio Landini	
No	Italian Labour Union (UIL)	Pierpaolo Bombardieri	

=== Organisations ===
Choice	Organisation	Type	Leader	Ref.
Yes	Unitary Body of the Italian Bar Association (OUA)	Bar association	Mirella Casiello	
Yes	Transnational Radical Party (PRT)	Political association	Maurizio Turco	
Yes	Hands Off Cain (NTC)	Anti-death penalty non-governmental organisation	Rita Bernardini	
Yes	Union of the Italian Criminal Chambers (UCPI)	Lawyers' union	Francesco Petrelli	
Yes	National Council of Lawyers (CNF)	Bar association	Francesco Greco	
Yes	Luigi Einaudi Foundation (FLE)	Research institute	Giuseppe Benedetto	
Yes	Enzo Tortora Foundation (FET)	Pro-civil rights and pro-judicial reform organisation	Francesca Scopelliti	
No	National Association of Magistrates (ANM)	Associative body of magistrates	Cesare Parodi	
No	Libera	Anti-mafia association	Luigi Ciotti, Francesca Rispoli	
No	National Association of Italian Partisans (ANPI)	Partisan veterans' association	Gianfranco Pagliarulo	
No	Italian Recreational and Cultural Association (ARCI)	Non-profit association	Walter Massa	
No	Christian Associations of Italian Workers (ACLI)	Lay Catholic association	Emiliano Manfredonia	
No	Pax Christi (PC)	Catholic peace movement	Giovanni Ricchiuti	
No	Legambiente	Pro-environmentalist association	Stefano Ciafani	
No	Articolo 21 (A21)	Pro-free speech advocacy group	Paolo Borrometi	
No	National Association of Democratic Jurists (GD)	Law collective	Aurora d'Agostino, Cesare Antetomaso, Roberto Lamacchia, Fabio Marcelli	
No	Freedom and Justice (LG)	Cultural political association	Daniela Padoan	
No	Federconsumatori	Pro-consumer rights association	Michele Carrus	
No	Auser	Voluntary association	Domenico Pantaleo	
No	Democratic Medicine (MD)	Pro-health rights political movement	Marco Caldiroli	
No	High School Students Network (RSM)	Students' union	Angela Verdecchia	
No	Students' Union (UDS)	Students' union	Alice Beccari, Tommaso Martelli	
No	Union of University Students (UDU)	Students' union	Alessandro Bruscella	

== Opinion polls ==
=== Polls aggregations ===
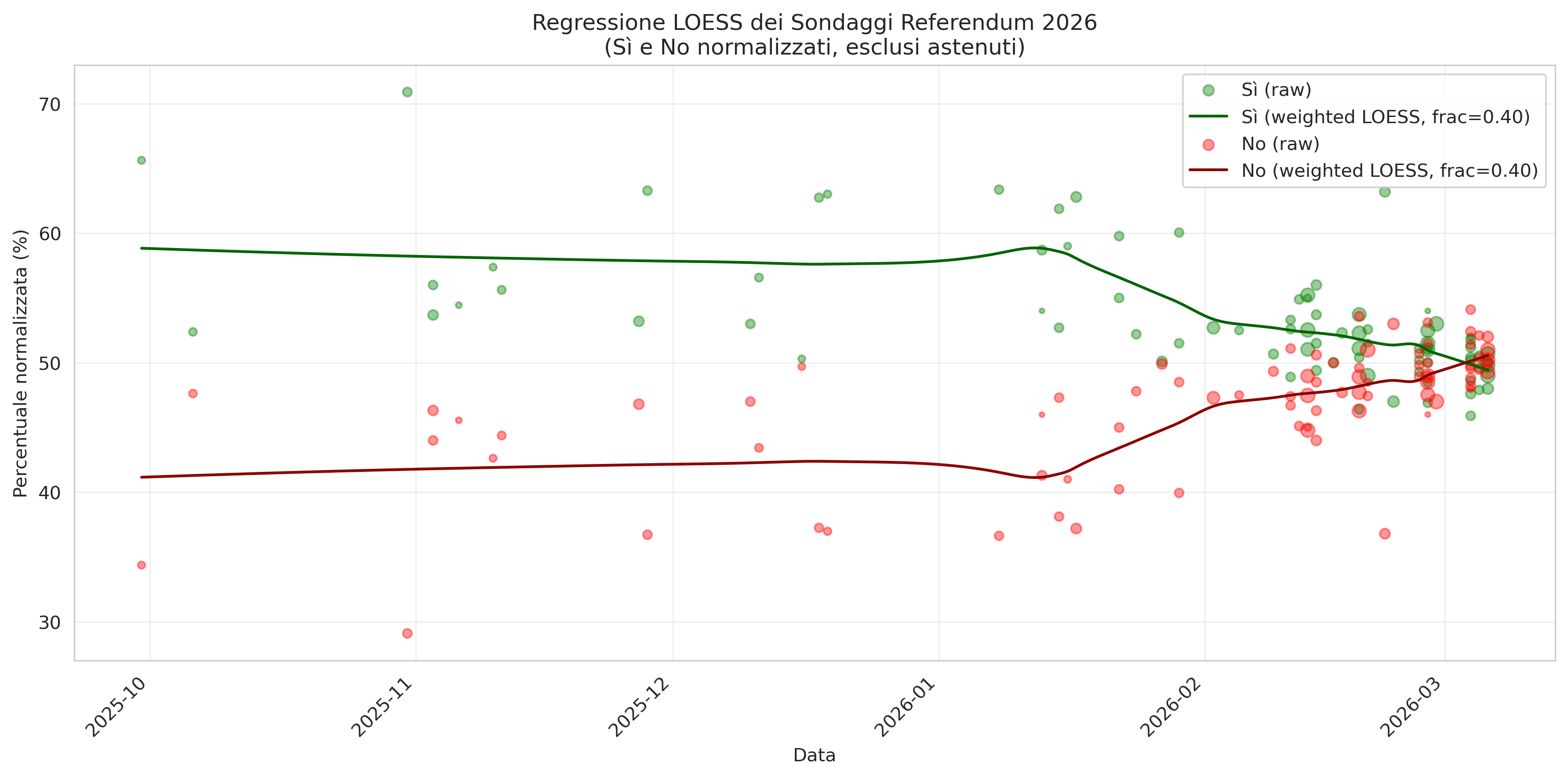
Weighted LOESS graph of polls on the constitutional referendum. Normalised "Yes/No" curves (excluding undecided voters), points weighted by sample size.

Date	Polling firm	Yes	No	Lead
7 Mar 2026	Cassandra	49.7	50.3	0.6
6 Mar 2026	YouTrend	50.1	49.9	0.2
6 Mar 2026	BiDiMedia	50.5	49.5	1.0
26 Feb 2026	BiDiMedia	52.3	47.7	4.6
26 Feb 2026	YouTrend	51.2	48.8	2.4
12 Feb 2026	YouTrend	53.0	47.0	6.0

=== All polls ===
Date	Polling firm	Yes	No	Lead
6 Mar 2026	BiDiMedia (Note: Excluding undecided voters, with turnout at 44%)	49.0	51.0	2.0
6 Mar 2026	BiDiMedia (Note: Excluding undecided voters, with turnout at 47%)	49.8	50.2	0.4
6 Mar 2026	BiDiMedia (Note: Excluding undecided voters, with turnout at 51%)	50.7	49.3	1.4
6 Mar 2026	EMG Different	42.4	42.6	0.2
6 Mar 2026	SWG	48.0	52.0	4.0
5 Mar 2026	Tecnè	51.5	48.5	3.0
23 Feb 2026	Ixè	47.2	52.8	5.6
23 Feb 2026	Tecnè	55.0	45,0	10.0
20 Feb 2026	Demopolis	49.0	51.0	2.0
17 Feb 2026	Only Numbers	52.3	47.7	4.6
11 Feb 2026	YouTrend	48.9	51.1	2.2
5 Feb 2026	Only Numbers	52.5	47.5	5.0
2 Feb 2026	Demopolis	39.0	35.0	4.0
29 Jan 2026	Eumetra	51.5	48.5	3.0
27 Jan 2026	Ixè	50.1	49.9	0.2
24 Jan 2026	Eumetra	52.2	47.8	4.4
22 Jan 2026	YouTrend	55.0	45.0	10.0
17 Jan 2026	Lab21	62.8	37.2	25.6
16 Jan 2026	Piepoli	59.0	41.0	18.0
15 Jan 2026	Eumetra	52.7	47.3	5.4
16 Dec 2025	Ipsos	50.3	49.7	0.6
11 Dec 2025	YouTrend	56.7	43.3	13.4
27 Nov 2025	Ixè	53.2	46.8	6.4
11 Nov 2025	YouTrend	56.1	43.9	12.2
31 Oct 2025	IZI	70.9	29.1	41.8
6 Oct 2025	BiDiMedia	33.0	30.0	3.0

== Outcome ==
=== Results ===
Choice	Votes	%
For	13,250,709	46.76
Against	15,085,410	53.24
Total	28,336,119	100.00
Valid votes	28,336,119	98.94
Invalid/blank votes	304,104	1.06
Total votes	28,640,223	100.00
Registered voters/turnout	51,425,745	55.69
Source: Ministry of the Interior

Popular vote
No	53.24%
Yes	46.76%

==== Results by region ====
Region	Yes	No	Turnout
Abruzzo	48.23%	51.77%	60.50%
Basilicata	39.97%	60.03%	53.26%
Calabria	42.74%	57.26%	48.39%
Campania	34.78%	65.22%	50.38%
Emilia-Romagna	42.75%	57.25%	66.67%
Friuli-Venezia Giulia	54.47%	45.53%	61.62%
Lazio	45.40%	54.60%	61.70%
Liguria	42.97%	57.03%	62.24%
Lombardy	53.56%	46.44%	63.76%
Marche	46.26%	53.74%	63.77%
Molise	45.30%	54.70%	54.01%
Piedmont	46.50%	53.50%	62.61%
Apulia	42.86%	57.14%	52.03%
Sardinia	40.56%	59.44%	52.85%
Sicily	39.02%	60.98%	46.13%
Trentino-Alto Adige/Südtirol	49.41%	50.59%	52.45%
Tuscany	41.84%	58.16%	66.27%
Umbria	48.32%	51.68%	65.05%
Aosta Valley	48.19%	51.81%	58.59%
Veneto	58.41%	41.59%	63.48%
Italy	46.26%	53.74%	58.93%
Europe	43.76%	56.24%	26.91%
South America	72.86%	27.14%	33.74%
North and Central America	57.64%	42.36%	22.45%
Africa, Asia, Oceania, and Antarctica	53.02%	46.98%	22.18%
Abroad	56.34%	43.66%	28.53%
Total (Italy+Abroad)	46.77%	53.23%	55.69%
Source: Ministry of Interior

=== Turnout ===
The electorate for the referendum consisted of 51,425,112 voters, from which 45,946,273 in Italy (registered in 61,533 sections) and 5,478,839 residing abroad (registered in 2,207 consular districts). By the end of the first day of voting, the turnout was reported at 46%, which was significantly higher than expected.

Turnout
Italy				Abroad	Total
Sunday			Monday	Abroad	Total
12:00	19:00	23:00	15:00	Abroad	Total
14.92%	38.89%	46.06%	58.93%	28.53%	55.69%

=== Electorate demographics ===
Sociology of the electorate
Demographic	Yes	No	Percentage
Total vote	46.2%	53.7%	55.7%
Sex
Men	48.5%	51.5%	48.5%
Women	44.1%	55.9%	51.5%
Age
18–34 years old	44.7%	55.3%	20.8%
35–49 years old	42.4%	57.6%	22.3%
50–64 years old	53.3%	46.7%	27.9%
65 or older	43.4%	56.6%	29.0%
Generation
Generation Z	41.5%	58.5%	13.1%
Millennials	45.2%	54.8%	21.5%
Generation X	48.3%	51.7%	29.4%
Baby Boomers & Silent	47.2%	52.8%	36.0%
Education
University	32.1%	67.9%	16.2%
High school	47.4%	52.6%	35.6%
Elementary/Middle school	51.4%	48.6%	48.2%
Economic condition
Upper	40.1%	59.9%	7.6%
Middle-upper	46.2%	53.8%	17.4%
Middle	48.6%	51.4%	32.2%
Middle-lower	46.8%	53.2%	30.4%
Lower	42.9%	57.1%	12.4%
Occupation
Manager/Entrepreneur	42.8%	57.2%	5.5%
Self-employed	46.1%	53.9%	6.7%
White-collar	46.5%	53.5%	18.3%
Blue-collar	50.4%	49.6%	17.8%
Unemployed	46.0%	54.0%	7.4%
Student	36.4%	63.6%	5.3%
Housewife	57.4%	42.6%	12.3%
Retired	43.0%	57.0%	26.7%
Religion
Regular practitioner	52.8%	47.2%	15.8%
Occasional practitioner	54.6%	45.4%	28.3%
Non-practitioner	50.9%	49.1%	17.1%
Others	47.9%	52.1%	5.4%
None	31.6%	68.4%	33.4%
Political position
Left-wing	5.8%	94.2%	11.7%
Centre-left	15.4%	84.6%	16.1%
Centre	50.9%	49.1%	8.4%
Centre-right	89.0%	11.0%	17.5%
Right-wing	93.3%	6.7%	10.7%
Independent	36.8%	63.2%	35.7%
Source: Ipsos Italia

=== Analysis ===
The victory of the "No" side was seen as a blow to the Meloni government and a boost to opposition parties ahead of the 2027 Italian general election, and ended a three-year period of relative calmness that was unusual in Italian politics. In an effort to restore credibility after the defeat, in addition to the resignations of Bartolozzi, the Ministry of Justice undersecretary Andrea Delmastro Delle Vedove, and the FI group leader Maurizio Gasparri, Meloni asked for Daniela Santanchè, the Minister of Tourism who is involved in legal proceedings related to fraud and false accounting, to step down.

=== Controversies ===
During a political event in Genzano di Lucania less than a week prior to the referendum, in a context where the "No" side was surging in polls, the FdI deputy Aldo Mattia called for the use of the "usual clientelist system" to get out the vote in favour of approving the government's constitutional reform, sparking an outcry from the opposition, which called on Meloni to condemn it. Mattia appeared to suggest the illegal practice of vote buying (voto di scambio), which was to be used to convince acquaintances to vote "Yes" once rational arguments had failed, using kinship ("Well, do me this favour because you're my cousin") or mutual favours ("because I've already done you so many") as leverage. The day before the referendum, Salvini (Deputy Prime Minister of Italy and Minister of Infrastructure and Transport) broke election silence by posting an image on X (formerly Twitter) with the word "SÌ" ("YES").

During the first day of the referendum, many parties, in particular the M5S and AVS, reported irregularities during the voting, such as a billboard with the word "YES!" in Genoa, police officers contesting the list representatives at the seats of the "No" committee for the legitimate use of the sign with the committee's logo and also preventing them from being admitted and therefore voting, and the presence of representatives of the FdI and Lega lists who gave voting instructions (for "Yes") at the polling stations (even with pins). FI members, such as Fulvio Martusciello, also reported the use of public transport in Naples to indicate to vote "No". A polling station in Sassari did not conclude the count of votes after the polls closed because there was a discrepancy between the number of ballots and votes. Ballots were sent for counting by the Provincial Office for the Referendum at the Court of Sassari; the ballots were tabled on official tally on 25 March 2026.

== See also ==
- Constitutional laws of Italy
- Judiciary of Italy
- List of constitutional referendums in Italy

== Bibliography ==
=== Articles ===
- Antonucci, Ermes (17 December 2025). "'I giudici devono essere liberi', dice Antonio Di Pietro sul caso di Milano svelato dal Foglio". Il Foglio (in Italian). Archived from the original on 8 February 2026.
- Bechis, Franco (19 November 2025). "Giovanni Falcone era sia pm che giudice allo stesso tempo. Ecco perché non ha senso oggi strumentalizzarlo per il referendum – Il video". Open (in Italian). Archived from the original on 14 February 2026.
- Bechis, Franco (21 January 2026). "L'infortunio di Barbero e il video che nessuno ha censurato. Ecco la vera storia del fact checking di Open sul referendum giustizia". Open (in Italian). Archived from the original on 7 February 2026.
- Berizzi, Paolo (3 February 2026). "CasaPound in campo per il referendum, attacca la 'giustizia progressista': 'Falli piangere, vota sì'". La Repubblica (in Italian). Archived from the original on 4 February 2026.
- Boezi, Francesco (24 January 2026). "Una lista di proscrizione nelle chat segrete del 'No'". Il Giornale (in Italian). Archived from the original on 9 February 2026.
- Bosco Bortolaso, Matteo (2 March 2026). "Venti giorni al referendum". RaiNews (in Italian).
- "Cambierà la data del referendum sulla giustizia?". Il Post (in Italian). 6 February 2026.
- Campigli, Virginia (12 December 2025). "Sull'Alta Corte disciplinare: un nuovo giudice speciale in violazione dell'art. 102 Costituzione?". Diario di Diritto Pubblico (in Italian). Archived from the original on 20 January 2026.
- Carlino, Riccardo (6 February 2026). "Caiazza frena Salvini: 'Infelice legare le scarcerazioni di Torino al referendum sulla giustizia'". Il Foglio (in Italian). Archived from the original on 8 February 2026.
- Cigna, Ygnazia (15 November 2025). "Gratteri e l'intervista fake di Falcone: «Il mio errore è stato strumentalizzato, lui la pensava davvero così»". Open (in Italian).
- "Conte per il No al referendum giustizia: 'È la fine del principio che la legge è uguale per tutti'". Il Fatto Quotidiano (in Italian). 11 January 2026. Archived from the original on 8 February 2026.
- Dardana, Cecilia (14 January 2026). "Sì, l'inchiesta su Garlasco fu fatta male. Ma non c'entra nulla con la riforma della giustizia. Ecco perché – Il video". Open (in Italian). Archived from the original on 8 February 2026.
- De Magistris, Luigi (20 November 2025). "Nordio loda il piano Gelli sulla giustizia: cosa significa per il referendum". Il Fatto Quotidiano (in Italian). Archived from the original on 24 January 2026.
- De Magistris, Luigi (18 December 2025). "Voterò No al referendum per i tanti giudici onesti ma dico: fuori i Giuda dalla magistratura". Il Fatto Quotidiano (in Italian). Archived from the original on 9 February 2026.
- Di Chio, Filippo; Romano, Alba (19 November 2025). "Riforma giustizia, la gaffe di Nordio sulla P2: «Gelli diceva anche cose vere». Poi il paragone con Gesù". Open (in Italian). Archived from the original on 11 December 2025.
- Fontana, Simone (26 January 2026). "Perché Non abbiamo limitato il video di Barbero su Facebook". Facta (in Italian). Archived from the original on 9 February 2026.
- "Giustizia: Noi Moderati-Maie, nasce il comitato per il Sì al referendum" (in Italian). Agenzia Nova. 29 November 2025. Archived from the original on 28 January 2026.
- "'Giusto dire no', al via le assemblee territoriali del Comitato in difesa della Costituzione". La Magistratura (in Italian). 18 November 2025. Archived from the original on 28 January 2026.
- "Il fact-checking di Barbero contro la riforma della giustizia". Pagella Politica (in Italian). 19 January 2026. Archived from the original on 7 February 2026.
- "La Cassazione: 'Cade il vecchio quesito del Referendum, se ne formula uno nuovo'" (in Italian). ANSA. 6 February 2026. Archived from the original on 6 February 2026.
- "La Cassazione modifica il quesito del referendum sulla giustizia: vince il no, rebus sulla data". La Repubblica (in Italian). 6 February 2026. Archived from the original on 6 February 2026.
- "La data del referendum sulla giustizia non cambia". Il Post (in Italian). 7 February 2026. Archived from the original on 8 February 2026.
- Logroscino, Adriana (12 January 2026). "La riforma della giustizia su cui si terrà il referendum a marzo, spiegata in 3 punti". Corriere della Sera (in Italian). Archived from the original on 12 January 2026.
- "Meta oscura il video in cui Barbero spiega perché voterà No al referendum, l'opposizione insorge". RaiNews (in Italian). 24 January 2026. Archived from the original on 25 January 2026.
- Milano, Ugo (15 November 2025). "Altro scivolone di Gratteri su Falcone: «Non voleva le carriere separate». Ma cita un discorso in cui dice l'esatto contrario". Open (in Italian). Archived from the original on 16 December 2025.
- Milano, Ugo (21 January 2026). "Nordio: «Molti all'opposizione sono pro riforma della Giustizia, ma votano 'no' per politica». Sul sito del ministero una foto a fumetti". Open (in Italian). Archived from the original on 16 February 2026.
- Milano, Ugo (9 March 2026b). "«Se vince il no, scappo. Col sì ci togliamo di mezzo la magistratura», la capa di gabinetto di Nordio in Tv sul referendum: scoppia la polemica – Il video". Open (in Italian).
- Miriami, Enza (24 November 2025). "Referendum giustizia, PDL lancia il comitato per il 'Sì'. Marattin: «Siamo il primo partito» e apre ad altre associazioni e partiti". Il Messaggero (in Italian). Archived from the original on 4 February 2026.
- Musacchio Vincenzo, Favorevole alla separazione delle carriere dei magistrati, ma al referendum confermativo voterò NO – Questione Giustizia, febbraio 2026 – Favorevole alla separazione delle carriere dei magistrati, ma al referendum confermativo voterò NO
- Nappi, Aniello (19 January 2026). "Il comitato per il no denunciato per diffusione di notizie false e tendenziose. Un'analisi critica tra testo e contesto della riforma". Questione Giustizia (in Italian).
- Lisi, Roberta (2 February 2026). "No al referendum, in campo 117 costituzionalisti". Collettiva (in Italian).
- "Nordio 'confessa': 'Con la riforma mai più invasioni di campo dei pm. Quando governerà il Pd servirà anche a loro'". Il Fatto Quotidiano (in Italian). 3 November 2025. Archived from the original on 22 March 2026.
- "Nordio: La riforma sulla giustizia non avrà e non deve avere effetti politici – Il video". Open (in Italian). 6 February 2026.
- "Nordio: 'La separazione delle carriere nel piano Gelli? Anche lui aveva idee giuste'". Il Fatto Quotidiano (in Italian). 18 November 2025. Archived from the original on 12 January 2026.
- Paolini, Danilo (16 November 2025). "Due Csm e sorteggio, che cosa cambia con le carriere separate". Avvenire (in Italian). Archived from the original on 9 December 2025.
- "Perché sono state raccolte le firme per indire un referendum già indetto". Il Post (in Italian). 15 January 2026. Archived from the original on 15 February 2026.
- Picariello, Angelo (1 January 2026). "«Csm demolito, riforma non condivisa. Perché si deve votare no al referendum»". Avvenire (in Italian). Archived from the original on 24 January 2026.
- Pipitone, Giuseppe (13 November 2025). "Separazione carriere, Armando Spataro: 'Falcone mai stato a favore: lui stesso passò da giudice a pm'". Il Fatto Quotidiano (in Italian).
- Puente, David (13 November 2025). "Le false citazioni di Falcone e Borsellino sulla separazione delle carriere: come si sono diffuse". Open (in Italian). Archived from the original on 31 December 2025.
- Puente, David (21 January 2026). "Referendum Giustizia, cosa dice davvero la riforma rispetto a quanto affermato da Barbero". Open (in Italian). Archived from the original on 7 February 2026.
- "Referendum, 150 sindaci firmano un appello per il No: 'La riforma non incide sulle vere emergenze della giustizia'". Il Fatto Quotidiano (in Italian). 24 January 2026. Archived from the original on 25 January 2026.
- "Referendum, Calenda: 'Voterò sì, è una riforma buona'" (in Italian). Adnkronos. 15 January 2026. Archived from the original on 16 January 2026.
- "Referendum giustizia, Bonelli: Votiamo no perché non affronta i veri problemi". Il Sole 24 Ore (in Italian). 24 January 2026. Archived from the original on 24 January 2026.
- "Referendum giustizia, CasaPound vota sì e Schlein attacca: polemiche per il post del Pd" (in Italian). Adnkronos. 4 February 2026. Archived from the original on 8 February 2026.
- "Referendum giustizia, gli ultimi sondaggi. Sì e no, chi si è schierato e cosa vota". Italia Oggi (in Italian). 6 February 2026.
- "Referendum giustizia, nasce il Comitato 'Popolari per il sì'". La Repubblica (in Italian). 21 January 2026. Archived from the original on 22 January 2026.
- "Referendum, Mattarella firma il decreto del governo: confermate le date del 22–23 marzo". RaiNews (in Italian). 6 February 2026. Archived from the original on 9 February 2026.
- "Referendum sulla giustizia, Forza Italia lancia la campagna per il Sì: 'Si apra il confronto, ma senza steccati ideologici'". ForlìToday (in Italian). 26 January 2026.
- "Referendum sulla giustizia, nasce a Como il comitato per il sì promosso da Alessandro Sallusti". QuiComo (in Italian). 26 January 2026. Archived from the original on 26 January 2026.
- Romanelli, Maurizio (20 February 2025). "La separazione delle carriere, tra ragioni apparenti e ragioni reali. I perché di un no". Sistema Penale (in Italian). Archived from the original on 15 January 2026.
- Sannino, Conchita (15 January 2026). "Referendum, raccolte oltre 500mila firme online. Nordio: 'Ricorso inutile ma aspettiamo il Tar'". La Repubblica (in Italian). Archived from the original on 16 January 2026.
- Sannino, Conchita (24 January 2026). "'Giustizia, basta bugie', campagna Pd per il no. Bufera sul caso Barbero". La Repubblica (in Italian).
- Sannino, Conchita (12 March 2026b). "Nordio blinda Bartolozzi e attacca le procure: "Sono più potenti del Papa"". la Repubblica (in Italian). Archived from the original on 13 March 2026.
- "Sì alla riforma sulla giustizia, ma senza simboli: Fratelli d'Italia si smarca da Lega e Forza Italia". Il Foglio (in Italian). 21 January 2026. Archived from the original on 22 January 2026.
- Valentinotti, Andrea (18 September 2025). "Davvero la separazione delle carriere sarà la soluzione a tutti i problemi della giustizia?". Questione Giustizia (in Italian). Archived from the original on 13 February 2026.

=== Debate ===
- Boato, Marco (18 January 2026). "Perché voterò no alla riforma della Giustizia, anche se sono favorevole alla separazione delle carriere". L'Unità (in Italian) – via Ristretti.
- "La riforma costituzionale della separazione delle carriere dei magistrati: le ragioni del sì e del no". Altalex (in Italian). 14 January 2026.
- Marattin, Luigi (30 October 2025). "La separazione delle carriere non guarirà la giustizia, ma serve uscire dallo status quo". Il Foglio (in Italian). Archived from the original on 15 January 2026.
- Occhipinti, Sara (28 January 2026). "Riforma della giustizia: il Manifesto degli Avvocati contrari". Altalex (in Italian).
- Occhipinti, Sara (28 January 2026). "Riforma della giustizia: il manifesto del Movimento Forense a favore del sì". Altalex (in Italian).
- Ottoni, Sibila (6 February 2026). "Il No di Cantone alla Riforma Nordio". Giustizia Insieme (in Italian). Archived from the original on 13 March 2026.
- "Perché No, la guida pratica al referendum di Marco Travaglio. Il primo video: come cambia la Costituzione? Cosa comporta la separazione delle carriere?". Il Fatto Quotidiano (in Italian). 31 January 2026.
- "'Perché No, guida al referendum su magistratura e politica': il nuovo libro di Travaglio coi contributi di Gratteri e Zagrebelsky". Il Fatto Quotidiano (in Italian). 30 January 2026. Archived from the original on 2 February 2026.
- "Perché No, Marco Travaglio: 'Come funziona oggi il processo e cosa cambierebbe se vincesse il Sì'". Il Fatto Quotidiano (in Italian). 7 February 2026. Archived from the original on 8 February 2026.
- Tanisi, Roberto (18 September 2024). "Il difficile mestiere del giudice e la Costituzione". BeeMagazine (in Italian). Archived from the original on 9 February 2026.

=== Documents ===
- "La riforma della magistratura". Dipartimento per il programma di Governo (in Italian). 30 October 2025. Archived from the original on 18 March 2026.
- Manna, Antonio; et al. (18 November 2025). "Ordinanza UCR 18 novembre 2025" (PDF). Sistema Penale (in Italian). Archived (PDF) from the original on 7 February 2026.
- "Referendum Giustizia. Si vota il 22 e 23 marzo". Il portale delle Prefetture (in Italian). 19 January 2026. Archived from the original on 12 February 2026.
- "Testo di legge costituzionale approvato in seconda votazione a maggioranza assoluta, ma inferiore ai due terzi dei membri di ciascuna Camera, recante: «Norme in materia di ordinamento giurisdizionale e di istituzione della Corte disciplinare»". Gazzetta Ufficiale (in Italian). 30 October 2025.

=== Parliamentary vote ===
- "Separazione delle carriere dei magistrati". OpenParlamento (in Italian). 16 September 2025. Archived from the original on 28 January 2026.

=== Party positions ===
- "25 domande e risposte" (PDF). ANPI (in Italian). 26 January 2026. Archived (PDF) from the original on 16 February 2026.
- Alicino, Riccardo (30 October 2025). "Giustizia: approvata riforma storica, mantenuto impegno con italiani". Fratelli d'Italia (in Italian). Archived from the original on 19 November 2025.
- Alicino, Riccardo (24 January 2026). "Referendum: da Comitato per il No liste proscrizione, solidarietà a giuristi coinvolti". Fratelli d'Italia (in Italian). Archived from the original on 27 January 2026.
- "Al referendum costituzionale del 22 e 23 marzo vota No". Partito Democratico (in Italian). 24 January 2026.
- "'Al referendum sulla giustizia voterò certamente sì': Marco Rizzo, ex di Rifondazione comunista e Pdci, non ha dubbi". Secolo d'Italia (in Italian). 10 November 2025. Archived from the original on 20 March 2026.
- Bozza, Claudio (9 January 2026). "Referendum giustizia, Renzi prende tempo: «La mia scelta sul voto la dirò 7 giorni prima»". Corriere della Sera (in Italian). Archived from the original on 28 January 2026.
- "Comitato Camere Penali per il sì". Camere Penali (in Italian). 16 July 2025. Archived from the original on 24 January 2026.
- "Giustizia: Casini, 'voterò contro riforma inutile'". L'Eco del Sannio (in Italian). 22 July 2025. Archived from the original on 7 February 2026.
- "Giustizia. Fratoianni (Avs), la controriforma della destra serve solo a colpire l'autonomia della magistratura. La cancelleremo con il referendum popolare". Alleanza Verdi Sinistra (in Italian). 16 January 2026.
- "Immaginaria riflessione di Bettino Craxi in merito alla riforma sulla giustizia Nordio". Lucio Barani (in Italian). 12 January 2026. Archived from the original on 28 January 2026.
- Labate, Tommaso (5 February 2026). 'Referendum sulla Giustizia: voterò convintamente sì'. Realpolitik (in Italian) – via Facebook.
- "Le ragioni del SÌ alla riforma" (PDF). Camere Penali (in Italian). 5 February 2026.
- "L'Union Valdôtaine invita a votare 'sì' al referendum sulla giustizia". Aosta Sera (in Italian). 24 January 2026. Archived from the original on 25 January 2026.
- "NO ai pieni poteri – il 22 e 23 marzo al referendum costituzionale vota no!". Sinistra Italiana (in Italian). 28 January 2026 – via Facebook.
- "Referendum Giustizia: Io Voto Sì". Lega Lombarda Salvini (in Italian). 27 January 2026. Archived from the original on 12 February 2026.
- "Referendum giustizia: perchè votiamo no". Potere al Popolo (in Italian). 17 November 2025.
- "Referendum giustizia, dal Sì di Previti e Dini al No di Pomicino: il grande ritorno delle «volpi» della politica". Corriere della Sera (in Italian). 25 January 2026. Archived from the original on 26 January 2026.
- "Referendum giustizia: Sì, ma meglio". ORA! (in Italian). 24 January 2026.
- "Referendum Giustizia. Un Sì 'ragionato' per un giudice terzo e imparziale e un pubblico ministero autonomo e indipendente". Partito Socialista Italiano (in Italian). 7 January 2026. Archived from the original on 14 January 2026.
- "Referendum: Magi, separazione giusta ma Meloni principale sponsor NO". Più Europa (in Italian). 10 January 2026.
- "Referendum, oltre 150 sindaci firmano per il No. Gualtieri: 'Non serve riscrivere la Costituzione'". La Repubblica (in Italian). 24 January 2026. Archived from the original on 25 January 2026.
- "Referendum, Rifondazione: 500.000 firme per difendere la Costituzione". Partito della Rifondazione Comunista (in Italian). 15 January 2026. Archived from the original on 18 January 2026.
- "Referendum sulla Giustizia, le posizioni dei partiti: chi si schiera per il «Sì», chi per il «No»". Corriere della Sera. 8 February 2026. Archived from the original on 8 February 2026.
- Sacchi, Paola (6 February 2026). "Chi da sinistra e da destra dirà Sì al referendum sulla giustizia". Startmag (in Italian).
- "Separazione delle carriere, sì a una riforma imperfetta ma giusta". Radicali Italiani (in Italian). 20 September 2025. Archived from the original on 16 February 2026.
- "Sì alla riforma della giustizia!". Unione di Centro (in Italian). 18 January 2026.
- "Referendum giustizia, vademecum per il No alla riforma della magistratura". CIGL (in Italian). 21 January 2026. Archived from the original on 14 February 2026.
- "Vademecum per il referendum costituzionale. Riforma della giustizia punto per punto. Le ragioni del Sì" (PDF). Forza Italia (in Italian). January 2026. Archived (PDF) from the original on 17 February 2026.
- "Vademecum per il Sì alla separazione delle carriere". Libertà Eguale (in Italian). 12 December 2025. Archived from the original on 28 January 2026.
- Vigoroso, Gianni (27 January 2026). "Alternativa popolare: adesione ai comitati per il SÌ referendum sulla giustizia". OttoPagine (in Italian). Archived from the original on 27 January 2026.
- "Vota No al Referendum Salva-Casta". Movimento 5 Stelle (in Italian). 20 January 2026. Archived from the original on 28 January 2026.
- "Votiamo NO al referendum costituzionale". Possibile (in Italian). 26 December 2025. Archived from the original on 23 January 2026.

=== Videos ===
- Barbero, Alessandro (18 January 2026). Anche Alessandro Barbero voterà NO al referendum sulla legge Nordio. E lo spiega così. Giusto dire No (video) (in Italian). Archived from the original on 31 January 2026 – via YouTube.
- Referendum – Le ragioni del si (video) (in Italian). Radio Radicale. 5 February 2026. Archived from the original on 8 February 2026 – via YouTube.
- Travaglio, Marco (30 January 2026). Perché No, la guida pratica al referendum di Marco Travaglio. Il Fatto Quotidiano (video) (in Italian). Archived from the original on 7 February 2026 – via YouTube.
- Travaglio, Marco (6 February 2026). Perché No. Marco Travaglio: 'Come funziona oggi il processo e cosa cambierebbe se vincesse il Sì'. Il Fatto Quotidiano (video) (in Italian). Archived from the original on 7 February 2026 – via YouTube.
