= Giuseppe Giulietti (politician) =

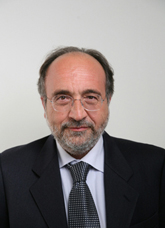
- Giuseppe (Beppe) Giulietti
- Born: October 19, 1953; Italy
- Occupations: Journalist, trade unionist, politician
- Employer: RAI (since 1979)
- Organizations: UsigRai (1982–1992), Articolo 21, Federazione Nazionale Stampa Italiana
- Known for: President of Federazione Nazionale Stampa Italiana, founder of Articolo 21
- Office: Member of the Italian Parliament (1994–2009)

Giuseppe Giulietti (born 19 October 1953) is an Italian journalist, trade unionist and politician.

Graduated in history of religions, Giulietti is a journalist at RAI since 1979, after being a reported for La domenica sportiva. He soon began a career in the trade union Federazione della Stampa, founding with other journalists a movement called "Fiesole Group". He became head of the RAI journalists' union (UsigRai) from 1982 to 1992 and was a member of their Watch Committee from 1990 to 1993.

He was first elected to the Italian Parliament in 1994 as an independent within the Progressives centre-left coalition. He was later re-elected as member of the Democratic Left Party, of the Democrats of the Left, and of Italy of Values (2008). He left the IoV group on 29 July 2009. He has been member of the committee on the public service broadcaster, and of the committee on Culture.

As an activist for freedom of the press, he founded the Articolo 21, liberi di... association, of which he was spokesperson. He collaborates with the daily Il Fatto Quotidiano.

Since 15 December 2015 he is the president of the Federazione Nazionale Stampa Italiana, the unitary trade union of Italian journalists.
