= Federazione Nazionale Stampa Italiana =

Trade union of Italy

FNSI
- Italian National Press Federation
- Federazione Nazionale Stampa Italiana
- Founded: 1908
- Headquarters: Rome
- Location: Italy
- Key people: Giuseppe Giulietti, President; Raffaele Lorusso, General Secretary
- Affiliations: International Federation of Journalists
- Website: FNSI.it

The Federazione Nazionale Stampa Italiana (Italian National Press Federation, FNSI) is the unitary trade union of the Italian journalists, which signs on their name the national collective agreement. Since 15 December 2015 it is chaired by Giuseppe Giulietti, replacing Santo Della Volpe after his death. The union secretary is Raffaele Lorusso.

== History ==
The first journalists' union in Italy was the Associazione della Stampa Periodica Italiana, founded in Rome on 16 December 1877 and first chaired by Francesco De Sanctis. It included both journalists and publishers.

The Press Federation was founded in 1908 by few regional associations of journalists, to unite the professional category and make it independent from political and economic powers. It was dissolved and replaced forcibly in 1925 by the Fascist Union of Journalists (Sindacato fascista dei giornalisti), created the year before. The FNSI was restored at the fall of fascism, with its first reunion on 27 July 1943. It restarted its activities at the end of the Nazi occupation of Rome, on 7 June 1944.

In 1974, it founded Casagit, the autonomous integration fund for journalists' healthcare.

FNSI today includes 19 regional press associations called Assostampa (the Campania one was expelled in March 2014), and three associations of Italian journalists abroad (in France, Germany, and the UK). It is member of the International Federation of Journalists (IFJ).

Its main aims are to be a guardian of press freedom, guarantee pluralism in the media, and protect the rights of journalists, also by promoting the professional value of the category.
