= David Sassoli =

President of the European Parliament from 2019 to 2022

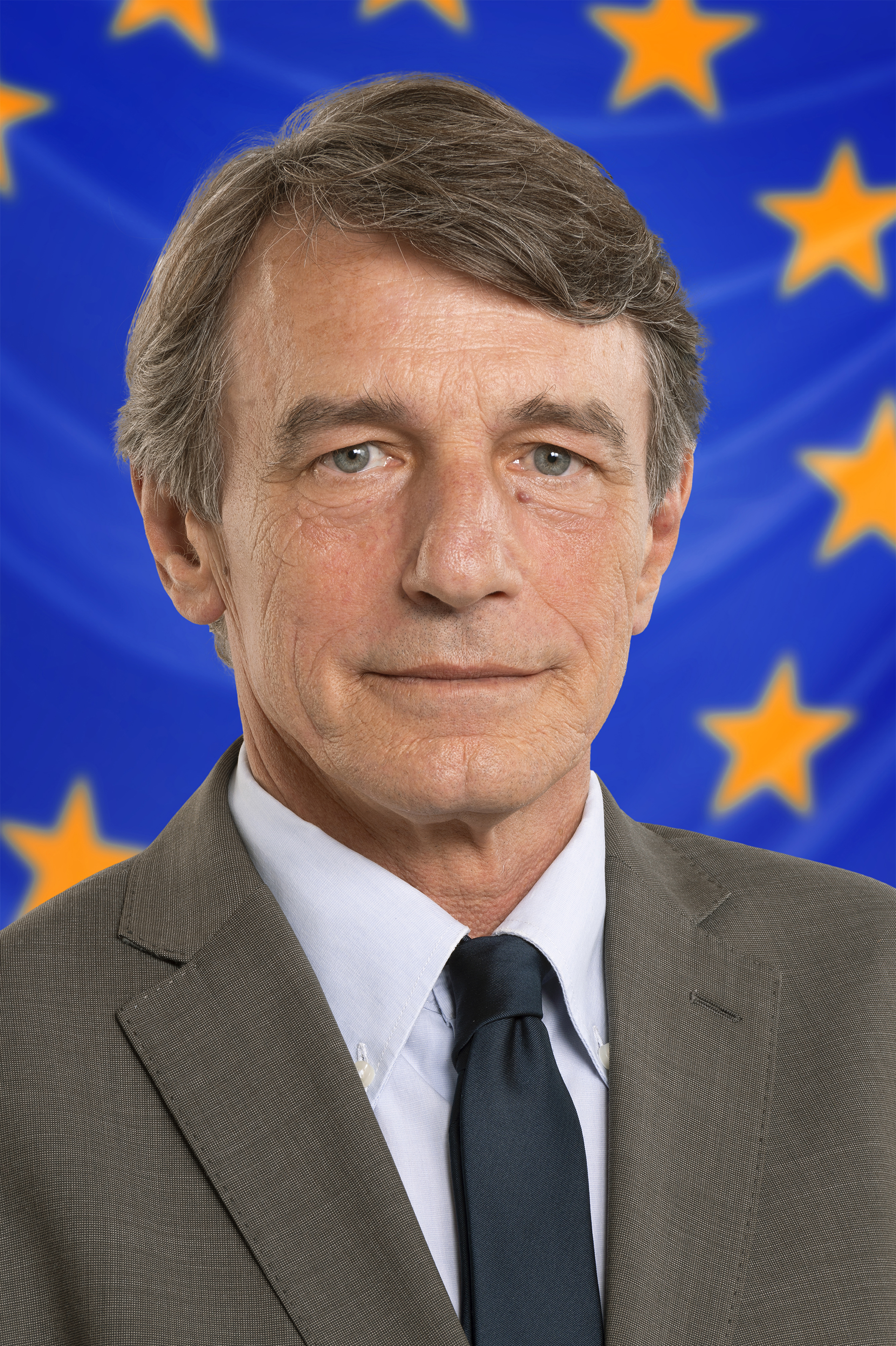
- Official portrait, 2019

President of the European Parliament
- In office 3 July 2019 – 11 January 2022
- Vice President: Mairead McGuinness; Roberta Metsola
- Preceded by: Antonio Tajani
- Succeeded by: Roberta Metsola

Member of the European Parliament for Central Italy
- In office 14 July 2009 – 11 January 2022
- Preceded by: Luisa Morgantini
- Succeeded by: Camilla Laureti

Personal details
- Born: David Maria Sassoli; 30 May 1956 Florence, Italy
- Died: 11 January 2022 (aged 65) Aviano, Italy
- Party: Democratic Party
- Other political affiliations: Progressive Alliance of Socialists and Democrats
- Spouse: Alessandra Vittorini
- Children: 2

David Maria Sassoli (Italian pronunciation: [ˈdaːvid maˈriːa sasˈsɔːli]; 30 May 1956 – 11 January 2022) was an Italian politician and journalist who served as the president of the European Parliament from 3 July 2019 until his death. Sassoli was first elected as a member of the European Parliament (MEP) in 2009.

== Early life and career ==
David Sassoli was born in Florence in 1956 to Tuscan parents from Florence and Prato. His name "David Maria" was chosen by his father in honour of David Maria Turoldo, an Italian presbyter and theologian. He studied at the department of political science at the Sapienza University of Rome.

He began his career as a journalist at the newspaper Il Tempo in Rome, before collaborating with various newspapers and the news agency ASCA. His first national premiere was in 1985, when he interviewed the escaped left-wing terrorist Oreste Scalzone at the Centre Pompidou in Paris. That year he moved to the Roman editorial office of the daily Il Giorno, where he followed the main political and news events for seven years. During this period, he was a direct witness to fundamental historical events, such as the fall of the Berlin Wall on 9 November 1989, being one of the many that brought the wall down physically. He was enrolled in the register of professional journalists from 3 July 1986 on.

In 1992, he became a reporter for television news program TG3, and in the same period he collaborated with Michele Santoro for some programs such as Il rosso e il nero (lit. 'The Red and the Black') and Tempo reale (lit. 'Real Time'). In 1996, he hosted the program Cronaca in diretta (lit. 'Live coverage'). After a few years, he was appointed anchorman of TG1, where he became one of the most notable and popular journalists in the country. In 2007, when Gianni Riotta was appointed the new director of TG1, Sassoli became his deputy director. Sassoli was also a supporter of Articolo 21, liberi di... (lit. 'Article 21, free to...'), an Italian association which includes journalists, writers, directors, and lawyers, with the aim of promoting freedom of expression.

== Political career (2009–2019) ==
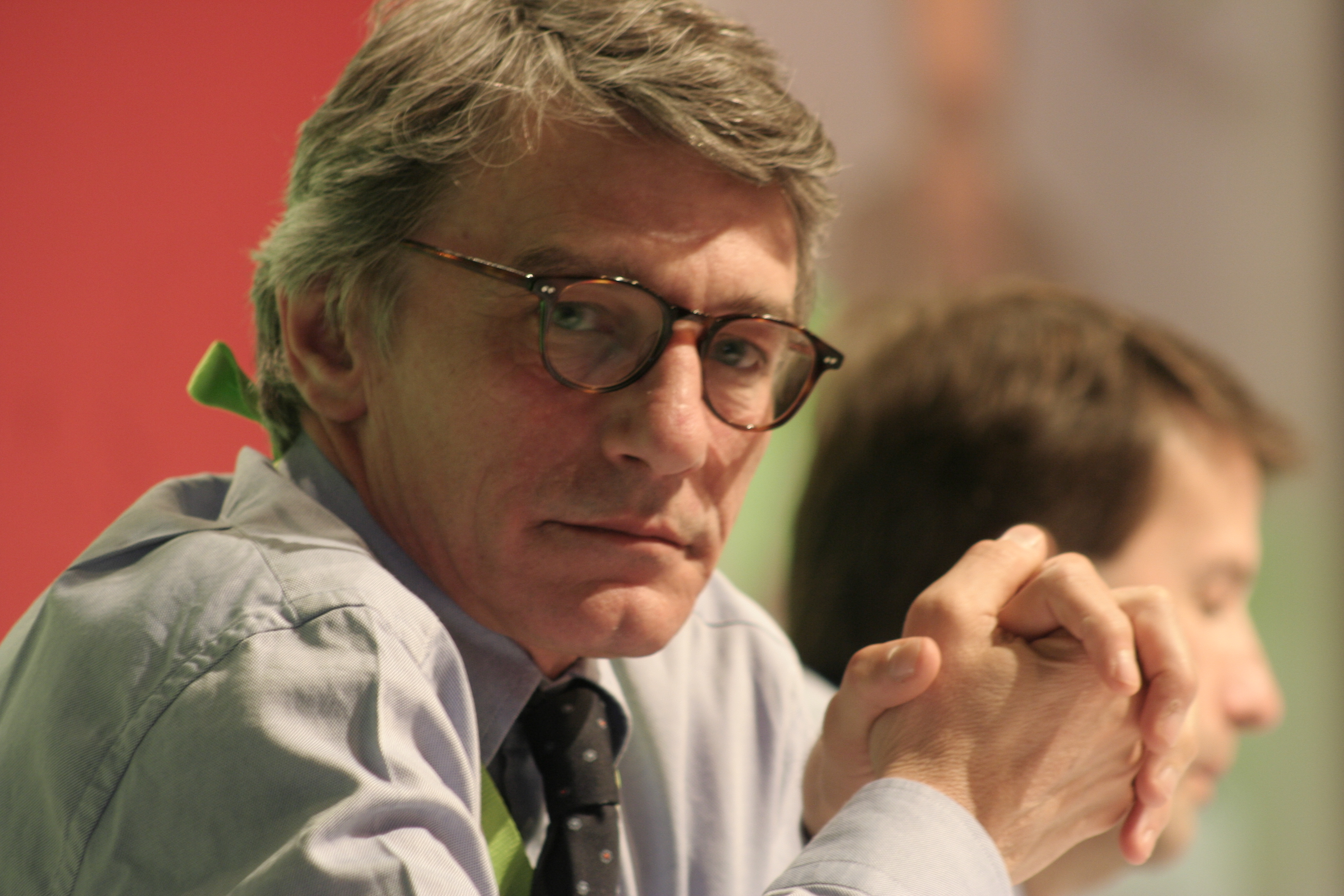
David Sassoli in 2010.

In 2009, Sassoli left his journalism career to enter politics, becoming a member of the centre-left Democratic Party (PD) and running in the 2009 European Parliament election, for the Central Italy district. On 7 June, he was elected member of the EP with 412,502 personal preferences, becoming the most voted for candidate in his constituency. From 2009 to 2014, he served as PD's delegation leader in the Parliament.

On 9 October 2012, Sassoli announced his candidacy in the primaries to become the centre-left's candidate as for the office of Mayor of Rome in the 2013 municipal election. He ended up in second place with 28 per cent of the vote, behind Senator Ignazio Marino, who received 55 per cent, and ahead of former minister of communications Paolo Gentiloni. Marino would be later elected mayor, defeating the right-wing incumbent, Gianni Alemanno.

In the European Parliament election of 2014, Sassoli was re-elected to the Parliament, with 206,170 preferences. The election was characterized by a strong showing of his Democratic Party, which received 41 per cent of votes.

On 1 July 2014 Sassoli was elected Vice-President of the European Parliament with 393 votes, making him the second most voted for Socialist candidate. In addition to his committee assignments, he was a member of the European Parliament Intergroup on Extreme Poverty and Human Rights.

== President of the European Parliament (2019–2022) ==
In the 2019 European Parliament election in Italy, Sassoli was re-elected to the European Parliament, with 128,533 votes. On 2 July 2019, he was proposed by the Progressive Alliance of Socialists and Democrats (S&D) as the new president of the European Parliament. On the following day, Sassoli was elected president by the assembly with 345 votes in favor, succeeding Antonio Tajani. He became the seventh Italian to hold the office.

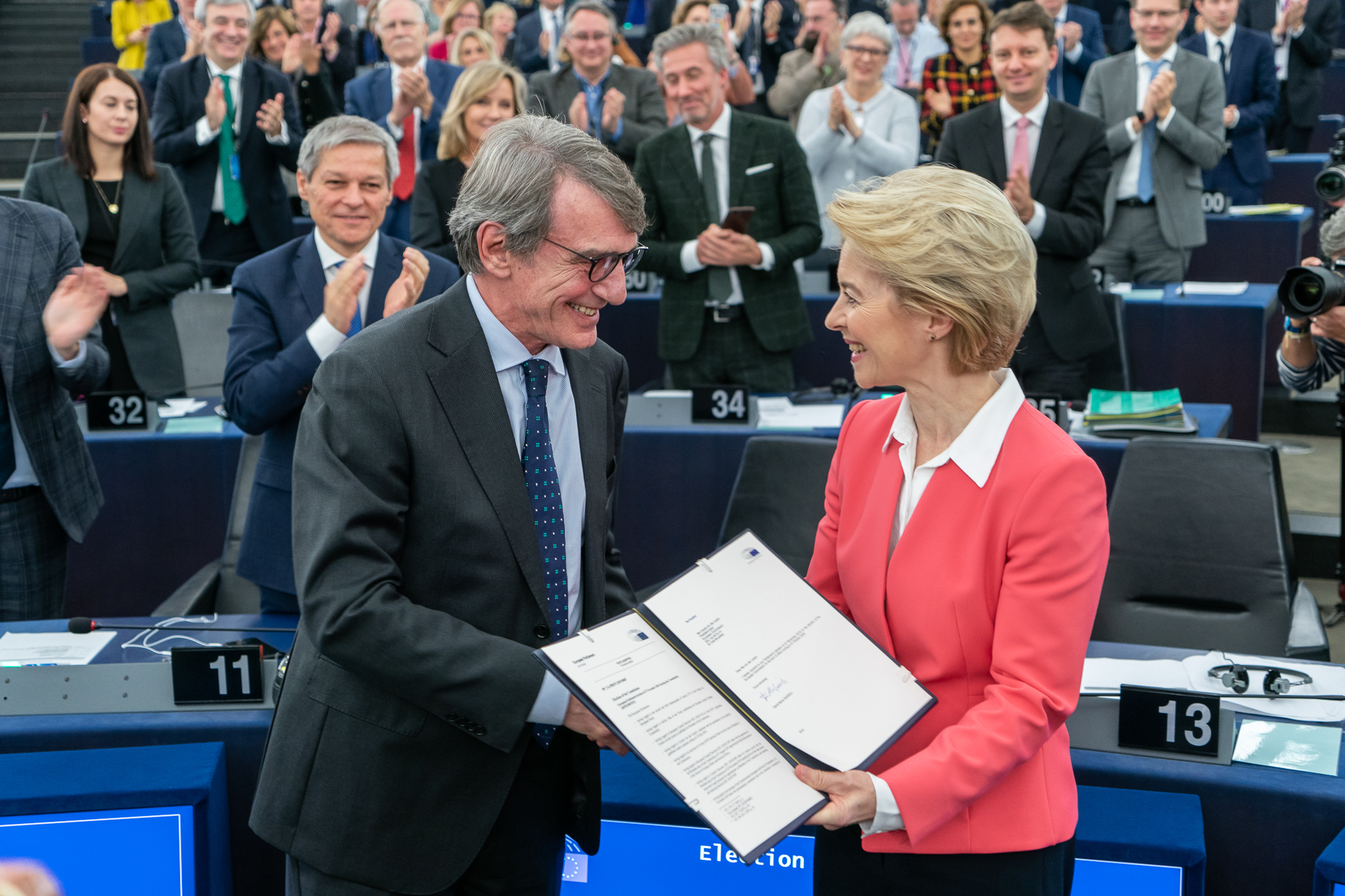
Sassoli with the newly elected President of the European Commission, Ursula von der Leyen

In his acceptance speech, Sassoli talked about the European project as a dream of peace and democracy. He said European citizens showed that they still believed in the project and talked about being proud of European diversity. He also added that "Europe will be stronger only with a Parliament which plays a more important role".

Moreover, in his first public act as the newly elected president, Sassoli decided to pay tribute to all the victims of terrorism in Europe, attending one of the sites of the 2016 Brussels bombings to commemorate the victims at Maalbeek/Maelbeek metro station. He said: "We must pay tribute to the victims in the capital of Europe. We must commemorate the European citizens who were victims of these attacks. This is a tribute to all the victims of terrorism. I wanted to start my time as President with this symbolic act."

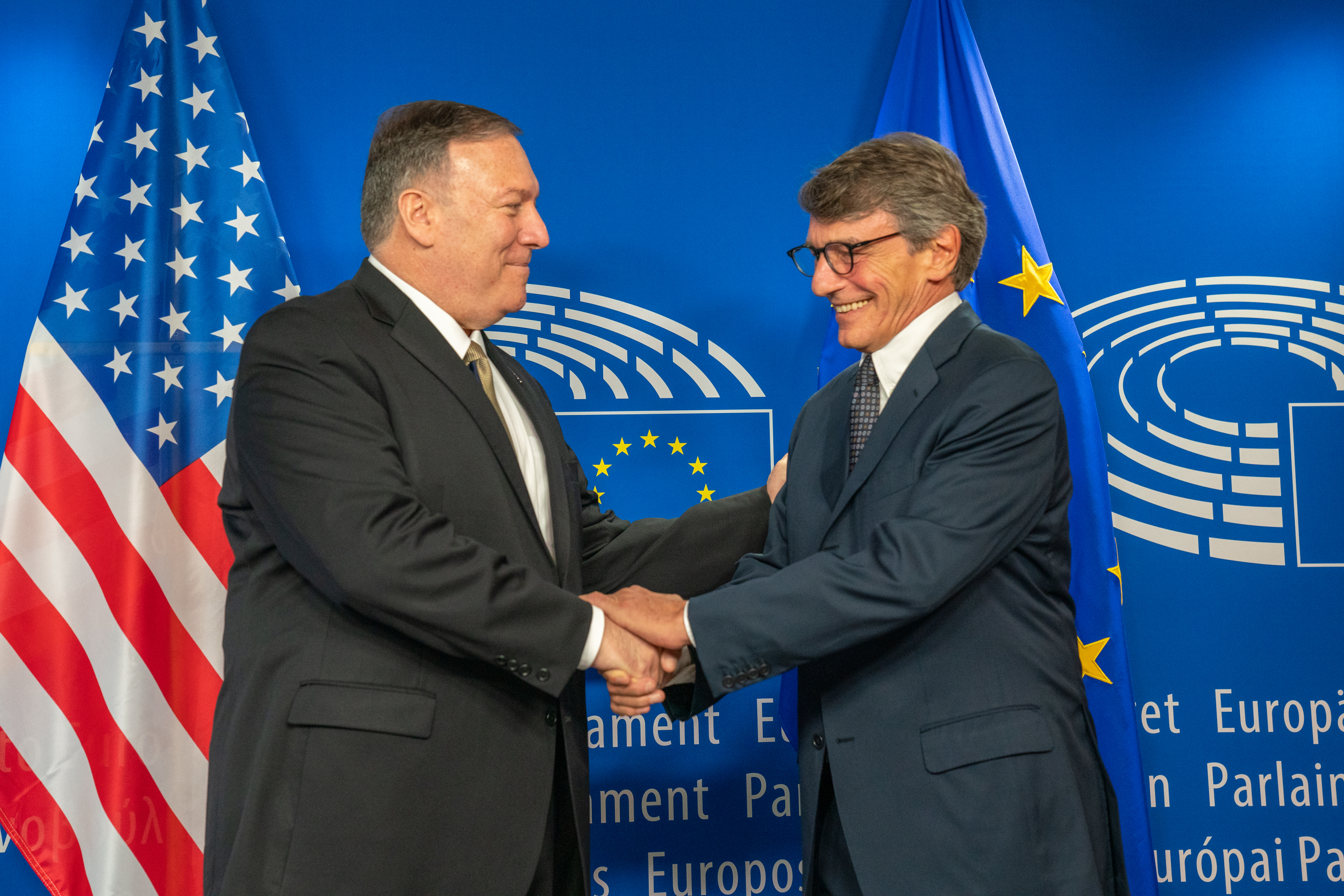
Sassoli with U.S. Secretary of State Mike Pompeo in Brussels, 3 September 2019

On 19 December 2019, Sassoli asked for the liberation of Oriol Junqueras, former vice president of Catalonia and recently elected MEP, who was imprisoned after the 2017 Spanish constitutional crisis. As a member of the European Parliament, Junqueras benefits from parliamentary immunity. Sassoli urged the Spanish authorities to comply with the European Parliament ruling.

In the midst of the COVID-19 outbreak that was beginning to deeply affect European countries, on 2 March 2020 Sassoli ordered the cancellation of visits to the European Parliament and the suspension of more than 100 events. On 10 March, he self-isolated in his Brussels residence after visiting Italy, as the Italian government ordered a national lockdown to deal with the spread of the virus. Following a videoconference with the leaders of the political groups, on 19 March he called an extraordinary session of Parliament for 26 March to approve new measures to address COVID-19 and for the first time a remote voting system would be used.

In June 2020, he signed the international appeal in favour of the so-called purple economy ("Towards a cultural renaissance of the economy"), published in Corriere della Sera, El País and Le Monde.

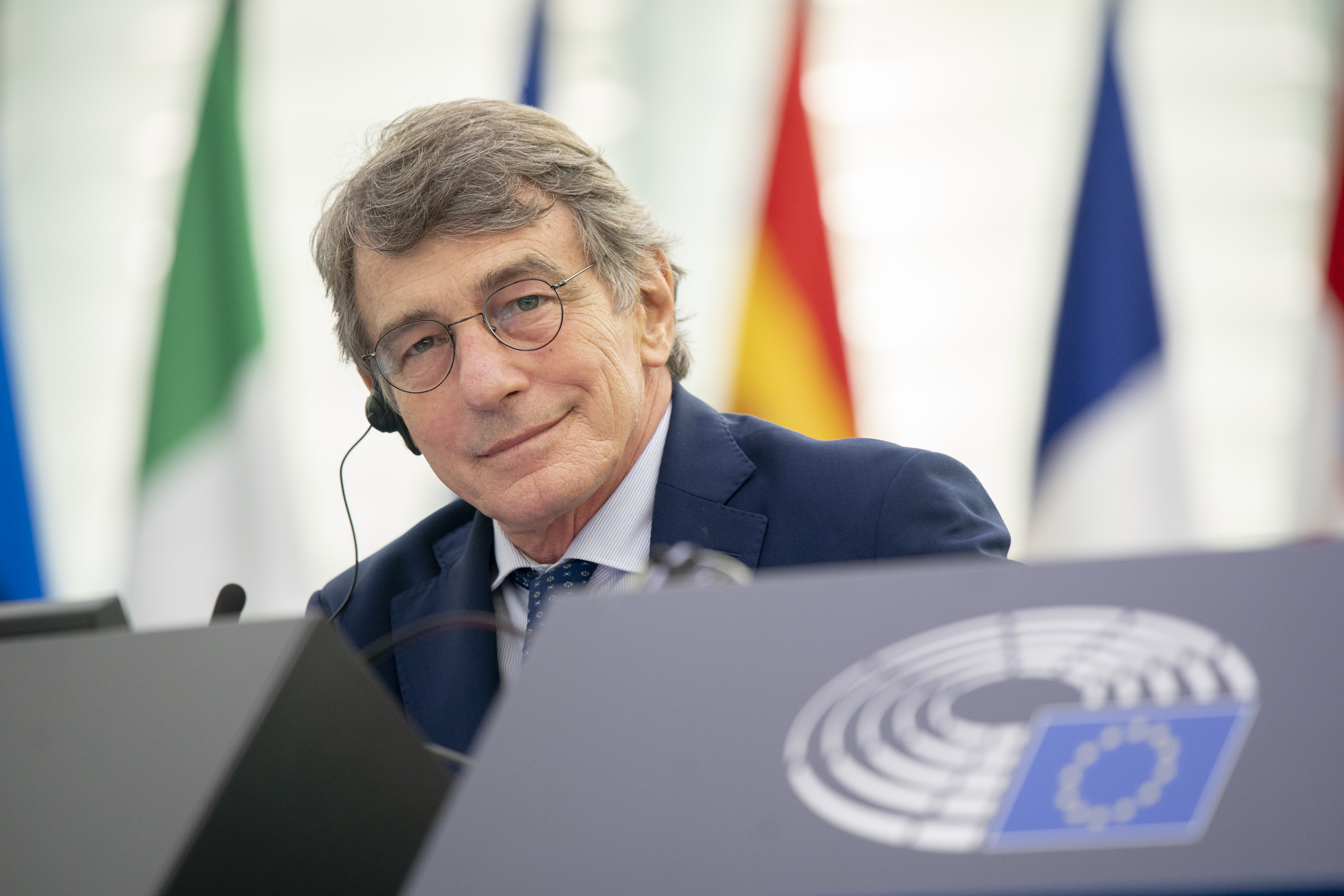
President David Sassoli at the European Parliament in 2021

In April 2021, Sassoli was included in a list of eight public officials that were banned by Russia's Ministry of Foreign Affairs from entering the country in retaliation for European Union sanctions on Russians.

After the Polish Constitutional Court ruled that parts of the Treaty on European Union were incompatible with its constitution, Sassoli said that "today's verdict in Poland cannot remain without consequences. The primacy of EU law must be undisputed. Violating it means challenging one of the founding principles of our union".

On 14 December 2021, it was announced that Sassoli informed S&D MEPs of his intention not to seek a second term of office as of January 2022, alleging that "we have done a lot to enlarge the majority of Ursula von der Leyen, […] I don’t want to destroy the European front. For that reason, I will not be available".

He was among the potential candidates of the Democratic Party to succeed Sergio Mattarella in the 2022 Italian presidential election.

== Personal life ==
Sassoli was married to Alessandra Vittorini with whom he had two children, Giulio and Livia. A leftist Catholic influenced by the ideas of Giorgio La Pira and don Lorenzo Milani, he was an active member of Articolo 21, liberi di... (lit. 'Article 21, free to...'), an Italian association founded on 27 February 2001 which includes journalists, writers, directors and lawyers and has the aim of promoting the constitutional principle of freedom of expression. Sassoli was a fan of classical music and of ACF Fiorentina, his hometown football team.

=== Death ===
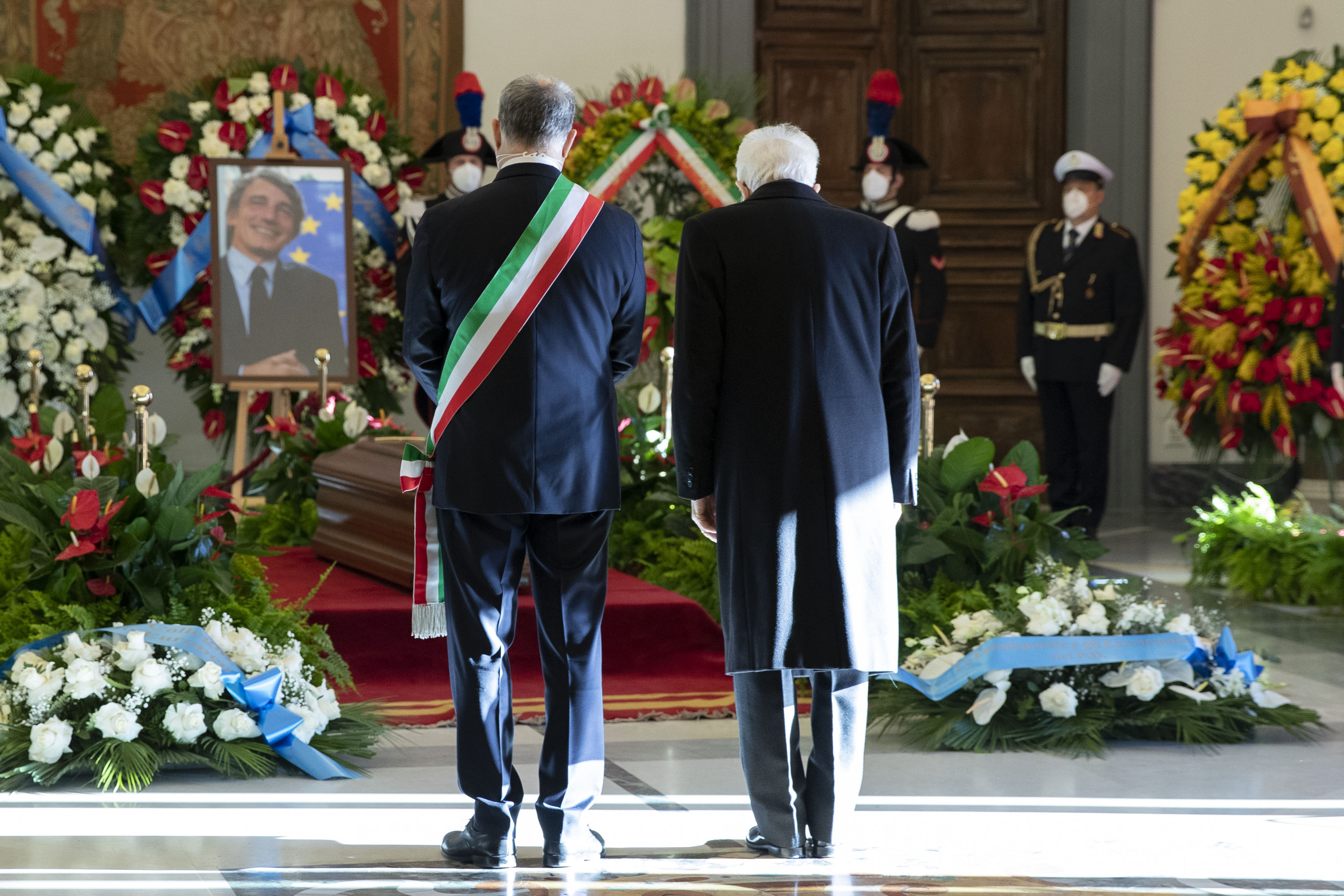
President Sergio Mattarella and mayor of Rome, Roberto Gualtieri, at Sassoli's funeral home

In September 2021, Sassoli was hospitalised in Strasbourg with a severe case of pneumonia caused by legionella. The illness meant he was unable to carry out his duties for more than two months including missing the EU's State of the Union. In December 2021, Sassoli was taken into hospital again, this time in Italy because of a "serious complication due to a dysfunction of the immune system" complicated by his multiple myeloma.

Sassoli died in the Oncology Referral Centre of Aviano on 11 January 2022, at the age of 65. A state funeral was proclaimed and celebrated on 14 January in Rome at the Basilica of St. Mary of the Angels and of the Martyrs. The ceremony was presided over by Cardinal Matteo Zuppi, archbishop of Bologna and close friend of Sassoli since adolescence. As per his will, Sassoli was buried in the cemetery of Sutri, a city near Viterbo where he often spent his free time with his family.

== Electoral history ==
Election	House	Constituency	Party	Votes	Result	Ref
2009	European Parliament	Central Italy	PD	405,967	Elected	
2014	European Parliament	Central Italy	PD	206,557	Elected	
2019	European Parliament	Central Italy	PD	128,572	Elected	

== Recognition and awards ==
- Premio Ischia Internazionale di Giornalismo as Best Television Reporter of the Year (1997).
- Honorary Membership of the National Association of Italian Authors (2018).
- Honorary President of the Accademia Cittadella Nicolaiana (2019).
- Key to the city of Florence (2019).
- Ventotene Key of Europe Award (2020)
- The EU Treaties Hall at the Palazzo della Farnesina was renamed in his honour (2022).
- The College of Europe named the 2022/23 promotion in his honour (2022)

Political offices
Preceded by Antonio Tajani	President of the European Parliament; 2019–2022	Succeeded by Roberta Metsola
