= Federico Orlando =

Italian politician and journalist

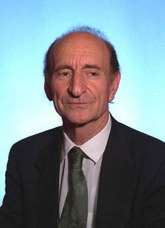
- Born: 13 October 1928
- Died: 8 August 2014 (aged 85)
- Occupations: Politician, journalist
- Years active: 1996–2001

Federico Orlando (13 October 1928 – 8 August 2014) was an Italian politician and journalist. He joined the newspaper, Il Giornale, in 1974, and eventually become co-editor. He served as a member of the Chamber of Deputies from 1996 to 2001. He co-founded the online newspaper Articolo 21, liberi di... in 2001.
