= Il Dubbio =

Newspaper in Rome, Italy

- Owner(s): Fai
- Founder(s): Piero Sansonetti
- Publisher: Edizioni Legge e Ragione SRL
- Editor-in-chief: Davide Varì
- Founded: 12 April 2016
- Language: Italian
- Headquarters: Rome
- Country: Italy

Il Dubbio (Italian: The Doubt) is an Italian newspaper which was launched by Piero Sansonetti in 2016. The first issue of the paper appeared on 12 April, and it is headquartered in Rome. Il Dubbio was started having 16 color pages and covers both political and legal news.

Piero Sansonetti was the founding editor-in-chief. In January 2021 Davide Varì was appointed the editor-in-chief of the paper replacing Carlo Fusi in the post. Carlo Fusi served in the post from 2 April 2019 when he replaced Piero Sansonetti as editor-in-chief. The owner of Il Dubbio is a foundation, Fai, the foundation of the National Bar Council. The paper is published by Edizioni Legge e Ragione SRL.
