= Articolo 21, liberi di... =

Articolo 21, liberi di... (Article 21, free to...) is an Italian advocacy group promoting freedom of expression. They also operate the online newspaper, Article21.info.

== History ==
Articolo 21, liberi di... was founded in 2002, by journalists Federico Orlando (collaborator of Indro Montanelli) and Sergio Lepri (former director of ANSA), together with the MP Giuseppe Giulietti and the lawyer Tommaso Fulfaro. Other members of the association include David Sassoli, Piero Marrazzo, Sandro Curzi, Giuliano Montaldo, Sergio Staino, Giovanna Melandri, Paolo Serventi Longhi, and Vincenzo Vita.

Its website, working as an information portal on media freedom and pluralism since May 2002, is directed by Giorgio Santelli and Stefano Corradino.
