= Nicolò Zanon =

Italian judge and law professor (born 1961)

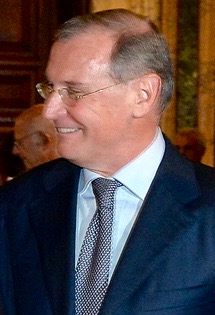

Judge of the Constitutional Court of Italy
- In office 11 November 2014 – 11 November 2023
- Appointed by: Giorgio Napolitano

Personal details
- Born: 27 March 1961 (age 65) Turin, Italy

Nicolò Zanon (Italian pronunciation: [nikoˈlɔ ddzaˈnon]; born 27 March 1961) is an Italian judge and law professor. He has been Judge of the Constitutional Court of Italy from 11 November 2014 to 11 November 2023. Previously he was a law professor at the University of Milan.

== Career ==
Zanon was born in Turin. He was a professor of Constitutional law at the University of Milan before being appointed to the Constitutional Court by the Italian President, Giorgio Napolitano, on 18 October 2014. Zanon had also worked at the University of Turin as a comparative constitutional law researcher and as an assistant to Valerio Onida, a judge on the Constitutional Court of Italy. Zanon was sworn in on 11 November 2014.

Zanon was made Knight Grand Cross in the Order of Merit of the Italian Republic on 31 May 2017.
