= Law collective =

A law collective is a non-hierarchical organization which provides legal aid to a community or communities in need. Such work ranges from traditional criminal defense, to advocacy on behalf of immigrants, to legal support at large and small protests, to "Know Your Rights" and other law-related workshops.

There were many law collectives in the 1970s. These collectives ran as worker-run, cooperative law firms. They often had revolutionary politics, and supported explicitly revolutionary groups and individuals. Lawyer and non-lawyer employees were paid the same wages, and had equal decision-making power. At some law collectives, workers supporting families were paid more. A handful of law collectives organized along those lines still exist - for example, the People's Law Office in Chicago, Illinois and the Portland Law Collective in Portland, Oregon.

Such law collectives' activities may have been covertly disrupted by government officials in order to diminish their effectiveness. For example, the Bar Sinister law collective in Los Angeles was allegedly burgled by the FBI in 1971.

Since the 1999 Seattle WTO protests, there has been a small movement of activist law collectives. These groups are usually non-lawyer centered, run along anarchist principles (even if they do not explicitly identify as anarchist), and work as part of the movement for social justice. These law collectives are made up mostly or entirely of non-lawyers. They are located in cities including Philadelphia; Washington, DC; New York; Madison; Portland; Oakland; and Montreal, Quebec, Ottawa, Ontario, and Toronto, Ontario in Canada. Also, since June 2009, the Minnesota Law Collective has been open in St. Paul, Minnesota.

This new generation of law collective works to assist people in providing their own legal support. They give "trainer trainings" so people can give "Know Your Rights" and other workshops to their communities; teach people to provide legal support for their affinity groups or for specific protests; and to explain the law in general and law collective work in particular.

Law collectives have been central in the defense of activists from criminal prosecution in such protests including the Seattle WTO protests in November 1999; the "A16" World Bank and International Monetary Fund protests in 2000; the Republican and Democratic convention protests, also in 2000; the Free Trade Area of the Americas (FTAA) protests in 2001 and 2004; protests by the Ontario Coalition Against Poverty; in protests around the US against the war in Iraq in 2003; in New York, Oakland, and Chicago during the Occupy movement in 2011; and in after unarmed black men were killed by police officers in Ferguson and Baltimore in 2014 and 2015.
