= Fondazione Luigi Einaudi =

Private foundation in Rome, Italy

Coordinates: 45.0665°N 7.6901°E

The Fondazione Luigi Einaudi (in English: Luigi Einaudi Foundation) is an Italian onlus (nonprofit organization) established in Rome in 1962 on the initiative of Giovanni Malagodi, the then secretary of the Italian Liberal Party (PLI), and the party was for decades useful cultural support despite their autonomy. Named after Luigi Einaudi, a prominent liberal politician, PLI member, and the second Italian president in the history of the Italian Republic.

It is an institution separate from the homonymous Luigi Einaudi Foundation in Turin, the latter founded directly by the heirs of Luigi Einaudi.

In 1984, the statute of the Luigi Einaudi Foundation was reformed by eliminating the presence of law of the secretary of the PLI by the governing board of the foundation in order to start a process totally independent, essentially aimed to study the new guidelines that faced in those years in Italy opening new horizons to the spread of liberal culture. With the dissolution of the PLI in 1994 in the collapse of the traditional parties of the First Italian Republic, the Luigi Einaudi Foundation came to represent the continuity of liberal culture, which was suddenly claimed by many as an essential element of new and old political parties as a two-party system developed in 1994.

The transition to the two-party system cut the liberal membership, and in fact those who were (in and out of PLI) recognised in the membership divided into the new system by choosing different political parties or none. In acknowledging this issue, the Luigi Einaudi Foundation decided to maintain and strengthen its choice, not of neutrality but of impartiality, not neutrality because it has its foundation and orientation in the liberal culture, and impartiality because the liberal culture, for the same characteristics that distinguish it, it does not lead to predetermined party options.

The Luigi Einaudi Foundation's choice of impartiality came during a time where liberal culture was a minority in the new political system, and thus required initiatives and tools that help to make it grow. To do this, the Luigi Einaudi Foundation advocates a debate and dialogue between different positions, presents any problem to a rational analysis and motivated schematics without preconceptions, and offers to those who want a place of freedom discussion to do so. The choices of those who intend to take an active part in liberal militant politics does not involve the Luigi Einaudi Foundation, returning them in the exercise of personal responsibility of each individual.

== Library ==
The library of the Luigi Einaudi Foundation in Rome is from the beginning the building block of its assets. It gradually formed around the first collection of books donated as a bequest from Alberto Giovannini, the secretary of the PLI in 1923. The library specializes in social sciences, modern and contemporary history, and political economy, with particular reference to the history of the PLI and the Italian liberal political, economic, and social thought. It is updated with the latest Italian and foreign production, and in particular with English-language publications. Since 2004, the library belongs to the national library system of Polo Capitoline.

== Archives and publications ==
The historical archives of the Luigi Einaudi Foundation specializes in the recovery and enhancement, through research, studies, and publications, of the sources to the history of the PLI during the years of the First Italian Republic (1943–1993) and has a significant documentary heritage consists primarily from the papers of Malagodi and his family and other significant liberal politicians within the PLI. The Luigi Einaudi Foundation holds seminars, study groups, and international conferences covering economics, the history of thought, and foreign affairs. Publications include an annals (Publicazioni della Fondazione Luigi Einaudi), a collection of studies (Studi), and a series on the classics of economic and political thought (Scrittori di politica, economia e storia).

== See also ==
- Liberalism and radicalism in Italy
