= Fatale =

Fatale may refer to:

- Fatale (Broadway Comics), a 1996 comic book series
- Fatale (film), an American thriller film
- Fatale (Image Comics), a supernatural noir comic book
- Fatale (Marvel Comics), a fictional antagonist of the X-Men
- Damage (1992 film) (French: Fatale), a British romance
- Natasha Fatale, a character in The Rocky and Bullwinkle Show animations
- Fatale, a 2009 vignette developed by Tale of Tales

== See also ==
- Fatal (disambiguation)
- Fatalis (disambiguation)
- Fatalism, a philosophical doctrine
- Fate (disambiguation)
- Femme fatale (disambiguation)
- Lethal (disambiguation)
