= Ludovicianum College =

The Ludovicianum College is a college located within the campus of the Università Cattolica del Sacro Cuore in Milan.

== History ==
This college was founded in 1921 together with the Augustinianum College. The Ludovicianum and Augustinianum were located in the same building in Via Necchi 5. The choice of name Ludovicianum is due to Ludovico Necchi, a central figure in the history of UCSC. In 1992 it became independent and it was decided to transfer the Augustinianum on a Necchi 1, in the structure that had previously hosted the women's Marianum College. The college is currently undergoing an expansion plan to allow for increased enrollment.

The members of the management of the college are personalities from academia. The chaplain is a priest belonging to the Pastoral Center. The logistics of the Ludovicianum College is exercised directly by the Università Cattolica del Sacro Cuore through EDUCatt, the foundation that aims to implement the right to education according to national and regional authorities.
