= Vita e pensiero (publishing) =

Italian publishing house

- Parent company: Università Cattolica del Sacro Cuore
- Founded: 1918
- Country of origin: Italy
- Headquarters location: Milan
- Publication types: Academic publishing
- Official website: www.vitaepensiero.it

Vita e pensiero is the publishing house of the Università Cattolica del Sacro Cuore.

== History ==
Vita e pensiero was founded in 1918 and the owner is Giuseppe Toniolo Institute for Advanced Studies. The name of university's publisher derives from the homonymous journal Vita e pensiero founded and directed by Agostino Gemelli and other Catholic intellectuals in 1914.

== Magazines ==
The publishing house publishes several research and cultural journals. The main magazine is Vita e pensiero, which is the official magazine of the University. In addition to it are published:

- Aegyptus
- Aevum
- Aevum Antiquum
- Annali di storia moderna e contemporanea
- Arte lombarda
- Bollettino dell'archivio per la storia del movimento sociale cattolico in Italia.
- Communicative business
- Comunicazioni sociali
- Comunicazioni sociali online
- Jus
- La rivista del clero italiano
- Politiche sociali e servizi
- Rivista d filosofia neo-scolastica
- Rivista di storia della chiesa in Italia
- Rivista internazionale di sciente sociali
- Statistica e applicazioni
- Studi di sociologia
