= Andrea Carlo Ferrari =

Italian Catholic cardinal (1850–1921)

Blessed Andrea Carlo Ferrari
- Cardinal, Archbishop of Milan
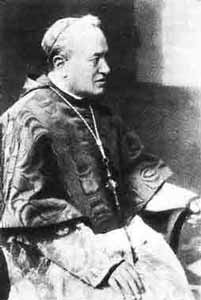
- Church: Catholic Church
- Archdiocese: Milan
- See: Milan
- Appointed: 21 May 1894
- Term ended: 2 February 1921
- Predecessor: Luigi Nazari di Calabiana
- Successor: Achille Ratti
- Other post: Cardinal-Priest of Santa Anastasia (1894–1921)
- Previous posts: Bishop of Guastalla (1890–1891); Bishop of Como (1891–1894)

Orders
- Ordination: 20 December 1873 by Domenico Maria Villa
- Consecration: 29 June 1890 by Lucido Maria Parocchi
- Created cardinal: 18 May 1894 by Pope Leo XIII
- Rank: Cardinal-Priest

Personal details
- Born: Andrea Ferrari; 13 August 1850 Lalatta (Palanzano), Province of Parma, Kingdom of Lombardy–Venetia
- Died: 2 February 1921 (aged 70) Milan, Lombardy, Kingdom of Italy
- Buried: Cathedral of Milan
- Parents: Giuseppe Ferrari & Maddalena Longarini
- Motto: Tu fortitudo mea ("You are my strength")
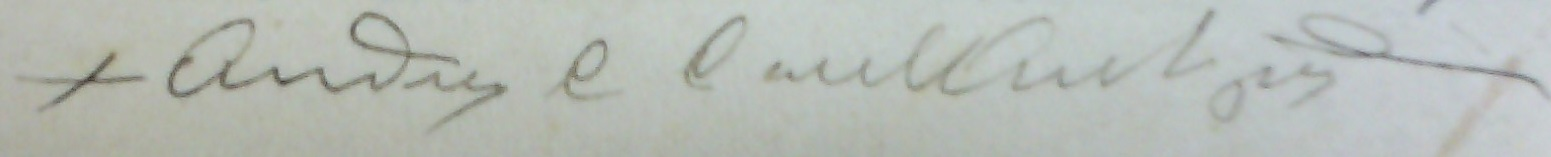
- Signature: Andrea Carlo Ferrari's signature

- Coat of arms: Andrea Carlo Ferrari's coat of arms

Sainthood
- Feast day: 1 February (Ambrosian Rite); 2 February (Roman Rite)
- Venerated in: Catholic Church
- Beatified: 10 May 1987; Saint Peter's Square, Vatican City by Pope John Paul II
- Attributes: Pastoral staff; Cardinal's attire; Crucifix
- Patronage: Archdiocese of Milan

Ordination history of Andrea Carlo Ferrari
History
Episcopal consecration
- Principal consecrator: Lucido Maria Parocchi
- Co-consecrators: Vincenzo Leone Sallua & Giovanni Maria Majoli
Cardinalate
- Elevated by: Pope Leo XIII
Episcopal succession
Bishops consecrated by Andrea Carlo Ferrari as principal consecrator
- Emilio Maria Miniati: 24 May 1894
- Angelo Maria Meraviglia Mantegazza: 24 May 1894
- Carlo Francesco Origo: 21 April 1895
- Giuseppe Salvatore Scatti: 27 February 1898
- Pasquale Morganti, O.Ss.C.A.: 22 June 1902
- Federico Domenico Sala: 15 February 1903
- Carlo Castelli, Obl.S.C.: 7 December 1904
- Giovanni Mauri: 7 December 1904
- Luigi Bignami: 14 January 1906
- Ernesto Maria Piovella, Obl. Rho.: 12 May 1907
- Leonida Mapelli: 6 January 1908
- Luigi Maria Marelli: 6 January 1908
- Dionisio Vismara, P.I.M.E.: 29 June 1909
- Giovanni Rosi: 29 June 1911
- Camillo Francesco Carrara, O.F.M. Cap.: 26 February 1911
- Eugenio Tosi, O.Ss.C.A.: 16 April 1911
- Cleto Cassani: 17 April 1911
- Giovanni Gamberoni: 25 May 1911
- Pompeo Ghezzi: 14 January 1912
- Carlo Pensa, O.Ss.C.A.: 8 September 1912
- Emilio Poletti: 29 September 1912
- Ludovico Antomelli, O.F.M.: 15 June 1913
- Pietro Calchi Novati: 7 February 1915
- Simone Pietro Grassi: 25 April 1915
- Carlo Dalmazio Minoretti: 16 January 1916

Andrea Ferrari (13 August 1850 – 2 February 1921) – later adopting the middle name "Carlo" – was an Italian Catholic prelate who served as a cardinal and as the Archbishop of Milan from 1894 until his death. Ferrari was a well-regarded pastor and theologian who led two dioceses before being appointed to the prestigious Milanese archdiocese which he led until his death. But he was later accused of Modernism, which led to a strained relationship with Pope Pius X, who finally reconciled with Ferrari in 1912.

The cause for his canonization opened after his death in 1963, and he was titled as a Servant of God. He was named Venerable in 1975, and Pope John Paul II beatified him in 1987.

== Life ==
=== Education and priesthood ===
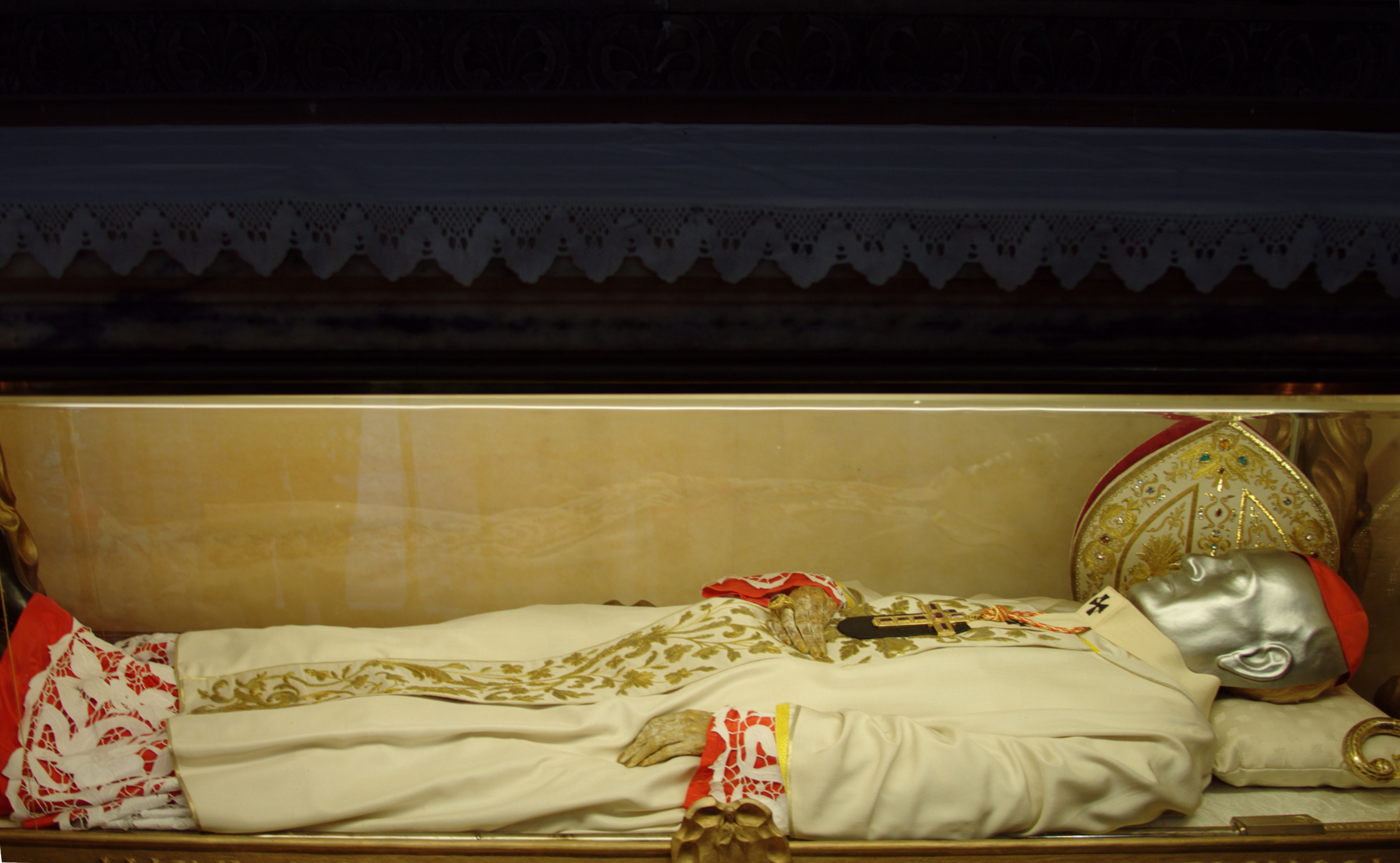
Cardinal Ferrari's remains housed in the Cathedral of Milan

Andrea Ferrari was born on 13 August 1850 in Lalatta (now Palanzano) in the Parma province as the eldest of four children to the shoemaker Giuseppe Ferrari and Maddalena Longarini; his baptism was celebrated on 14 August. His two paternal uncles, Abbondio and Pietro, were priests serving in Parma. He received his First Communion in 1860 from Father Giovanni Agostini and received his Confirmation in 1866.

He felt called to serve as a priest and was educated in Parma, where he was to obtain a doctorate in theological studies in 1883. Ferrari received the first two minor orders on 18 September 1869 and the other two on 23 September 1871. He received the subdiaconate on 21 September 1872 and the diaconate on 15 December 1872. He was ordained to the priesthood on 20 December 1873 for the Diocese of Parma, where he served from 1874 until 1890. He also served as the archpriest of Fornovo di Taro from 1874 until 1875, when he was made the vicar curate for the San Leonardo church.

Ferrari served as the Vice-Rector for seminarians in Parma and served also as a professor of mathematics and natural sciences in 1875, and later became its rector in 1877. He also served as a professor of theological fundamentals and ecclesial historical sciences, as well as educating them in moral theological subjects in 1878. It was later that he published the "Summula theologiae dogmaticae generalis" in 1885, which proved to be a respected work in the field at that time, and it was reprinted several times.

=== Episcopate ===
In mid-1890, he was appointed as the Bishop of Guastalla, and he received his episcopal consecration as a bishop on 29 June 1890 from Cardinal Lucido Parocchi in the church of the Sacred Heart of Jesus in Villa Lante. The co-consecrators were Vincenzo Leone Sallua and Giovanni Maria Majoli. He took possession of his new diocese on 3 October 1890 and was later transferred to the Diocese of Como in mid-1891 after a brief tenure in Guastalla. In Como, he was noted for his dedication to the people and made several pastoral visits to see all his parishes. In 1894, the newspaper Corriere della Sera noted his "meticulous visits" as proper diocesan management and attentiveness while noting that "he talks well with a good voice". In 1893, he supported the appointment of Giuseppe Melchiorre Sarto – future Pope Pius X – as Patriarch of Venice and was successful in securing the appointment.

=== Cardinalate ===
Ferrari was elevated to the cardinalate in 1894 and Pope Leo XIII named him as the Cardinal-Priest of Santa Anastasia (the title and red hat were conferred a week after the elevation). It was just a week after his elevation that he was transferred to the Archdiocese of Milan and was granted the pallium prior to his departure; he also took Carlo as a middle name in honour of Charles Borromeo who was a predecessor during the Counter-Reformation period. His private assistant while in Milan was Father Giovanni Rossi. Ferrari was a strong supporter and promoter of Rerum Novarum and espoused the core themes of social justice that the pope highlighted in that document. He also enlisted the aid of Giuseppe Toniolo to promote it and make it a theme of his professorship.

His main mission in Milan was to preserve the faith of the people through catechesis, and he made four pastoral visits as archbishop. He pushed for the publication of the Catechism of Pius X in Milan as a step towards this aim. He also visited all parishes in his archdiocese and was attentive to the social circumstances of each parish. In addition, Ferrari held several episcopal conferences to discuss matters of ecclesial life. In 1895, he held the Archdiocesan Eucharistic Congress from 1–5 September 1895.

Ferrari participated in the papal conclave in 1903 that elected Pope Pius X, and had been considered to be "papabile" for his pastoral qualities. Ferrari petitioned the cardinals to support a pastoral candidate to become pope and began casting his votes for his old colleague Sarto. He tried to persuade Sarto to accept the election if chosen, though the latter insisted that he should not be voted for and that he would not accept. But Ferrari insisted that the refusal could become harmful for the Church and painful for Sarto for the remainder of his life. But Francesco Satolli convinced Sarto of the ramifications of his refusal, which prompted Sarto's acceptance of the pontificate. Ferrari returned to Milan on 10 August and that month travelled to Cologne to meet with its archbishop Cardinal Anton Hubert Fischer.

In 1908, he was in London at Westminster for the nineteenth Eucharistic Congress held from 9–13 September. In 1910, he organized festivities for the third centennial of the canonization of Charles Borromeo. In 1918, he founded the Women's Youth for Azione Cattolica and entrusted its direction to Armida Barelli. During World War I, he formed a group that was dedicated to caring for soldiers and prisoners and was awarded in 1919 with the Grand Cross of the Order of Saints Maurizio and Lazzaro for his efforts.

Ferrari was accused of "Modernism" in 1907, which was an accusation that Pope Pius X had accepted. He was no Modernist and denounced them in a pastoral letter he issued in 1908. Despite this, the accusations put him in a negative position with Rome, and he decided to keep quiet so as not to attract the ire of Pius X. He had been accused of excessive liberalism and defended his archdiocese against misunderstandings that Rome held. However, this prompted a 1911 canonical investigation. In 1912, the pope realized the mistake he had made and received the cardinal after this matter was resolved for a reconciliation. In 1912, he promoted the establishment of the newspaper L'Italia, which replaced L'Unione. He also partook in the conclave in 1914 that elected Pope Benedict XV. Ferrari was on good terms with Angelo Giuseppe Roncalli, the future Pope John XXIII. The two knew the other well, and Roncalli was the one who celebrated his funeral. He was also close with Achille Ratti, who was his successor in Milan and the future Pope Pius XI. Ferrari ordained as priests the future cardinals Camillo Caccia Dominioni (1899) and Carlo Confalonieri (1916) in addition to Bishop Giorgio Giovanni Elli (1903) and Archbishop Mario Giardini (1904).

=== Death ===
Ferrari died in 1921 at 5:55 pm after he finished the recitation of one of the rosaries he himself started due to throat cancer, and was buried in the archdiocesan cathedral under the Sacred Heart altar. The first sign of his ailment around 1918 was simple hoarseness, later diagnosed as throat cancer. His old friend Roncalli referred to him later as an "authentic saint". In Legnano, a church was constructed from 1987 to 1989 and dedicated to him. Cardinal Carlo Maria Martini consecrated the church in 1991.

== Beatification ==
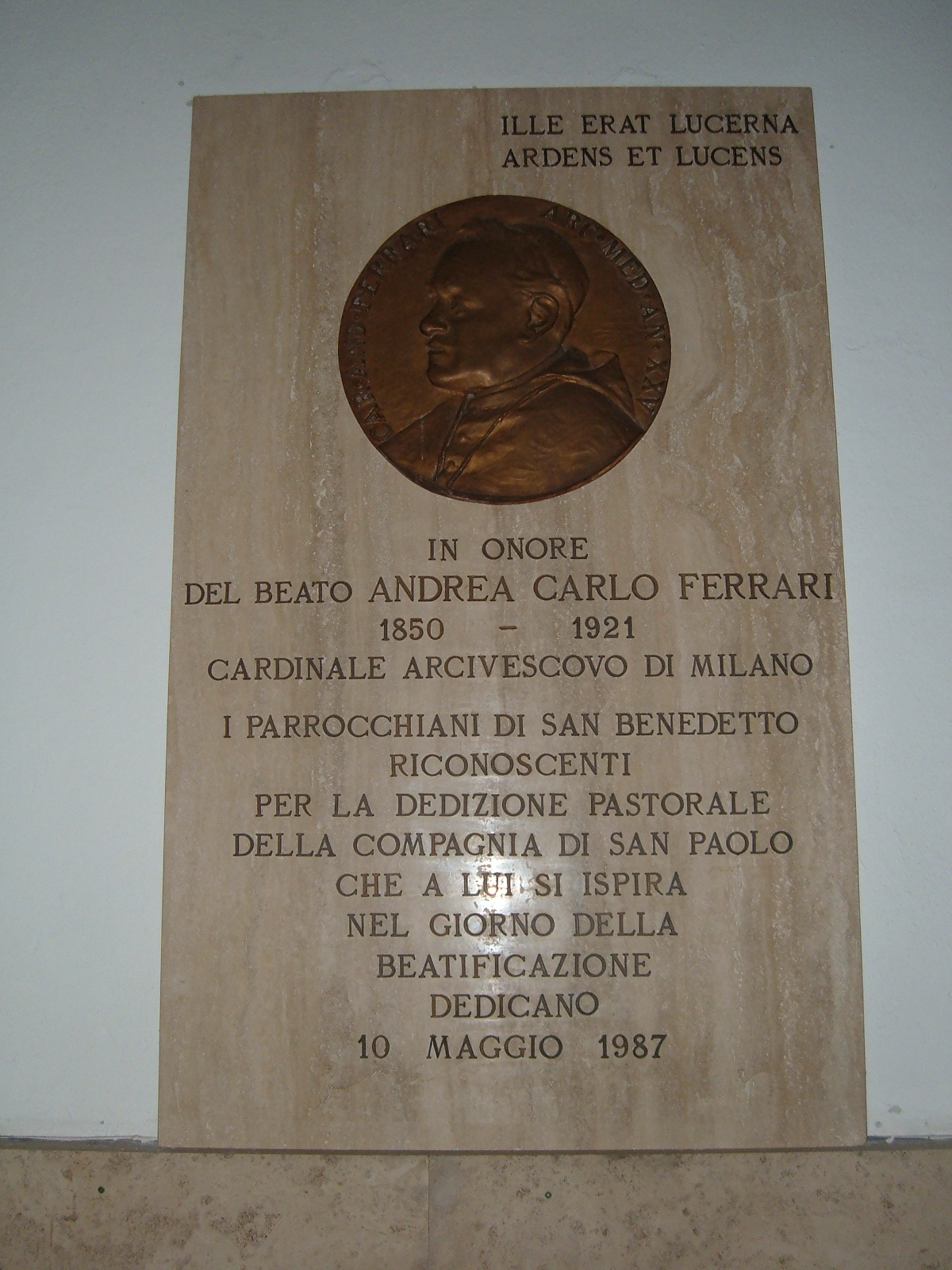
Plaque in honour of Ferrari, San Benedetto fuori Porta San Paolo, Rome

The Milanese came to revere Ferrari for his strong holiness, and his old friend Pope John XXIII opened his cause for canonization on 10 February 1963. This came after his Milanese successor Alfredo Ildefonso Schuster opened the informative phase of investigation for his beatification in 1951. Pope Paul VI (another Milanese successor) proclaimed him to be Venerable on 1 February 1975 in recognition of his life of heroic virtue. Pope John Paul II beatified Ferrari on 10 May 1987 in Saint Peter's Square.

The current postulator for this cause is the Franciscan priest Giovangiuseppe Califano.

Catholic Church titles
Preceded by Prospero Curti	Bishop of Guastalla; 23 June 1890-1 June 1891	Succeeded by Pietro Respighi
Preceded by Luigi Nicora	Bishop of Como; 1 June 1891-21 May 1894	Succeeded by Teodoro Valfrè di Bonzo
Preceded by Luigi Nazari di Calabiana	Archbishop of Milan; 21 May 1894–2 February 1921	Succeeded by Ambrogio Damiano Achille Ratti
Preceded by Carlo Laurenzi	Cardinal Priest of Sant'Anastasia; 21 May 1894–2 February 1921	Succeeded by Michael von Faulhaber
