= Università Cattolica del Sacro Cuore =

Private Catholic university in Italy

Catholic University of the Sacred Heart
- Università Cattolica del Sacro Cuore
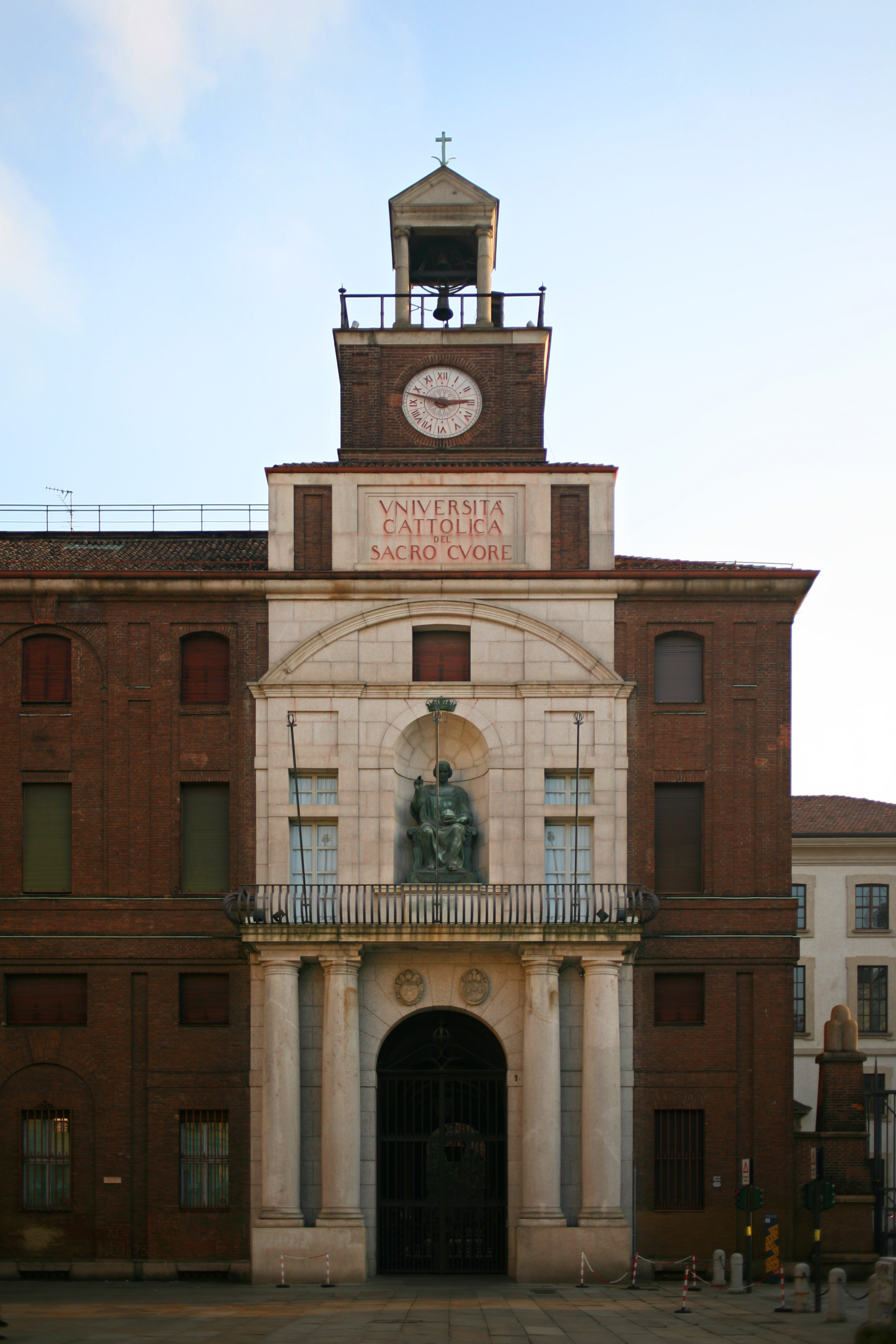
- Main entrance of the Milan campus
- Latin: Universitas Catholica Sacri Cordis Jesu Mediolanum
- Motto: Nel cuore della realtà (Italian)
- Motto in English: In the heart of reality
- Type: Private
- Established: 7 December 1921; 104 years ago
- Religious affiliation: Catholic Church
- Academic affiliations: IFCU
- Rector: Elena Beccalli
- Administrative staff: 1,214
- Students: 39,593 (2018)
- Location: Milan (main campus), Brescia, Cremona, Piacenza and Rome, Italy; 45°27′47″N 9°10′36″E
- Campus: Urban
- Newspaper: Vita e pensiero
- Colors: Blue and gold
- Sporting affiliations: CUS Milano
- Website: www.unicatt.it/en.html

The Università Cattolica del Sacro Cuore, (Note: Latin: Universitas Catholica Sacri Cordis Jesu; English: Catholic University of the Sacred Heart; abbreviated as UCSC or UNICATT) colloquially known as Catholic University of Milan or Cattolica, is a private Catholic research university based in Milan, Italy. It was founded in 1921. Its satellite campuses are located in Brescia, Piacenza, Cremona and Rome.

The university is organised into 12 faculties and 7 postgraduate schools. Cattolica provides undergraduate courses (bachelor's degree, which corresponds to Italian Laurea Triennale), postgraduate courses (master's degree, which corresponds to Laurea Magistrale, and specializing master) and PhD programs. In addition to these, the university runs several double degree programs with other institutions throughout the world. Degrees are offered both in Italian and in English.

Agostino Gemelli University Hospital serves as the teaching hospital for the medical school of the Università Cattolica del Sacro Cuore and owes its name to the university founder, the Franciscan friar, physician and psychologist Agostino Gemelli.

== History ==
=== The project ===
The embryonic project of a Catholic university began around 1870, guided by representatives of various Catholic cultural currents. In September 1918, when the First World War was ending, Giuseppe Toniolo, before dying, recommended to Father Agostino Gemelli and his staff to found the university, saying: "I will not see the end of the war, but you, when it is finished, do it, found the Università Cattolica".

=== The foundation and the establishment of faculties ===
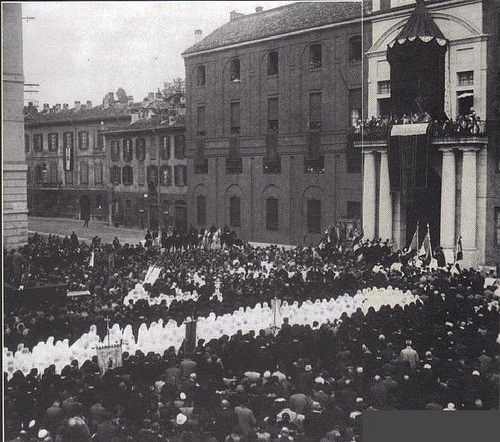
Inauguration of the headquarters of largo Gemelli in 1930

In 1919 Father Agostino Gemelli, Ludovico Necchi, Francesco Olgiati, Armida Barelli, and Ernesto Lombardo founded the Istituto Giuseppe Toniolo di Studi Superiori. On 24 June 1920, the institute was legally recognised with a decree signed by the Minister of Education, Benedetto Croce; at the same time, Pope Benedict XV officially recognised the university's ecclesiastical status.

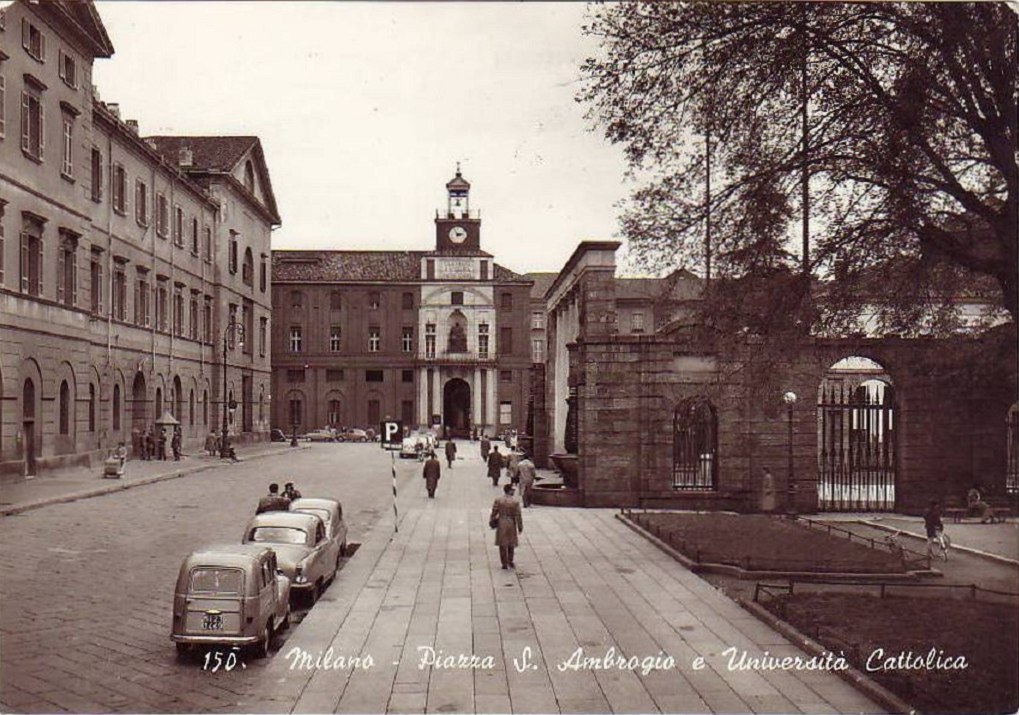
UCSC in 1950s

On 7 December 1921, the Università Cattolica del Sacro Cuore was officially inaugurated with a special Mass celebrated by Father Gemelli in the presence of Achille Ratti, the Cardinal and Archbishop of Milan, who three months later was elected Pope Pius XI. The first campus was in Palazzo del Canonica, at via Sant'Agnese 2. In October 1930, it was moved to the ancient St. Ambrose Monastery, where the main campus remains today. In 1921, 68 students enrolled in the university's 2 available programs, philosophy and social sciences. As of 2016, 14 programs were offered to 30,263 students distributed over the Milan, Brescia, Cremona, Piacenza and Rome campuses.

In 1924, following recognition from the Italian state, which allowed the awarding of legally-recognised degrees, the Humanities and Law Programs were inaugurated. The charter of the Università Cattolica was approved by Royal Decree on 2 October 1924, and published on 31 October on the Gazzetta Ufficiale. In 1923, the Istituto Superiore di Magistero was opened and in 1936 became an independent program, later evolving to become, in 1996, the School of Education Sciences.

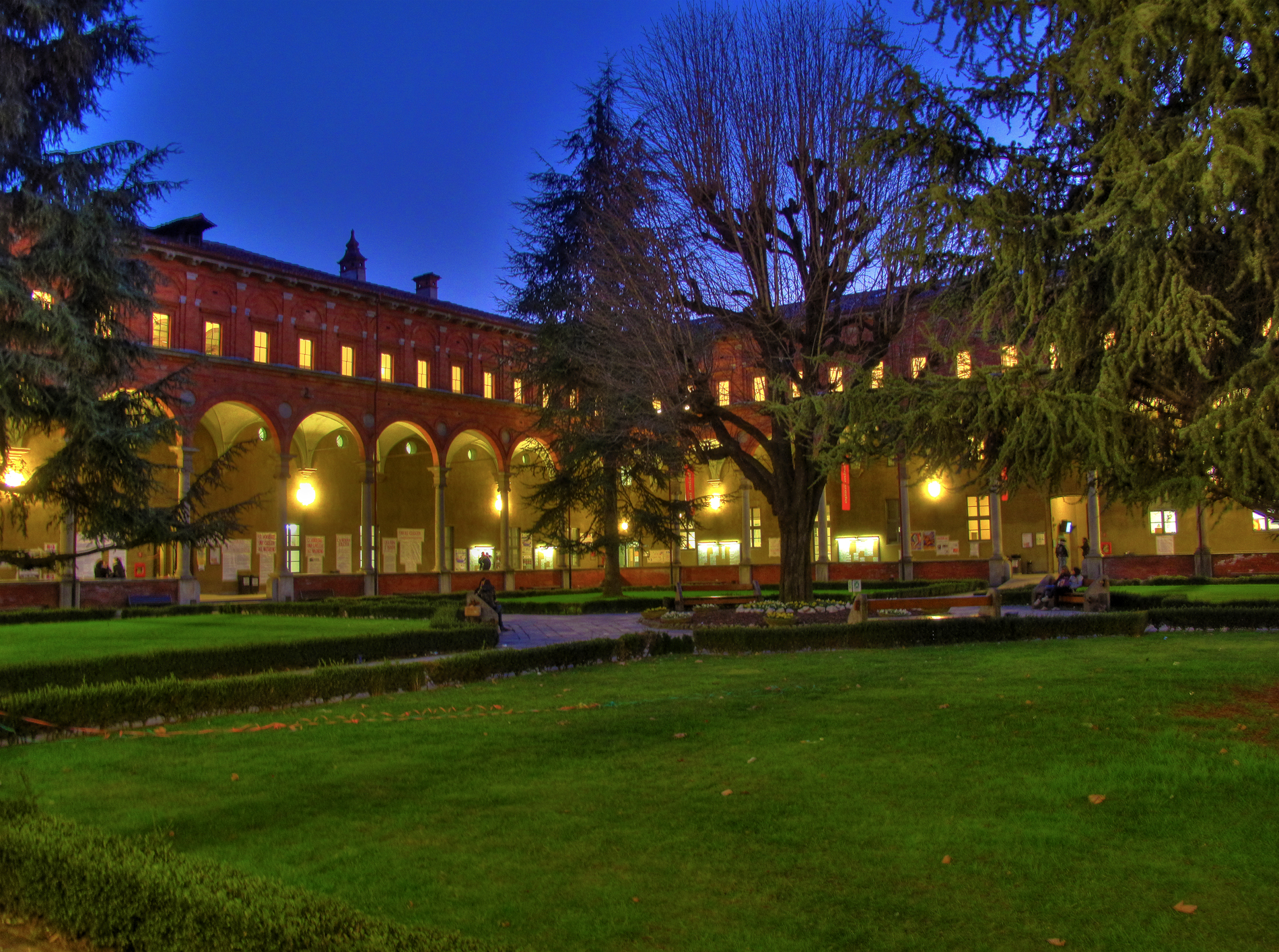
Milan's campus

In 1926, the economics and politics departments became independent from the School of Law and, in 1931, the autonomous Faculty of Political, Economic and Social Sciences was born, awarding also the university's business degrees until 1947. In 1936, the School of Political Science became independent. The work and efforts of the Università Cattolica continued throughout the post-war period with new campuses and programs opening. The School of Economics officially opened in 1947 with both day and night classes. On 30 October, in the presence of Italian President Luigi Einaudi, the first stone of the Piacenza campus was laid, with the official opening of the School of Agricultural Sciences taking place in November 1952.

On 4 August 1958, the official decree for the opening of a Medical School in Rome, which had been advocated by Father Gemelli, was approved. Enormous difficulties had made this long and complicated, and it was not until the end of the 1950s that the Biological Institutes and the Agostino Gemelli University Polyclinic were built in Rome. Construction began in 1959; in 1961 Pope John XXIII opened the Medical School, with the first medical doctors graduating in 1967. The school now offers both medical and dentistry programs.

In 1956, the Brescia campus of UCSC was inaugurated with the opening of the School of Teaching and Education. In 1971, at the initiative of important figures in the mathematical field, the School of Mathematics, Physics, and Natural Sciences was opened. During the 1990s, other schools were opened in Milan: the School of Banking, Finance, and Insurance Sciences (1990); the School of Foreign Languages and Literature (today the College of Linguistics) and Foreign Literature (1991); and the School of Psychology (1999). In 1997, in Piacenza, the School of Economics, once part of the Milan curriculum, opened independently, and the School of Law in 1995.

In 2000, thirteen Cultural Centres were opened across Italy. In these centres, through advanced satellite technology, distance-learning courses were activated in collaboration with the major university campuses. During the 2001–2002 academic year, the new School of Sociology, the fourteenth college of the Università Cattolica, was opened in Milan.

In 2012, two new schools were established: the School of Political and Social Science in Milan (from the union of the existing Faculty of Political Science and Sociology) and the School of Economics and Law in Piacenza-Cremona (from the union of the Faculty of Economics and Law Piacenza-Cremona).

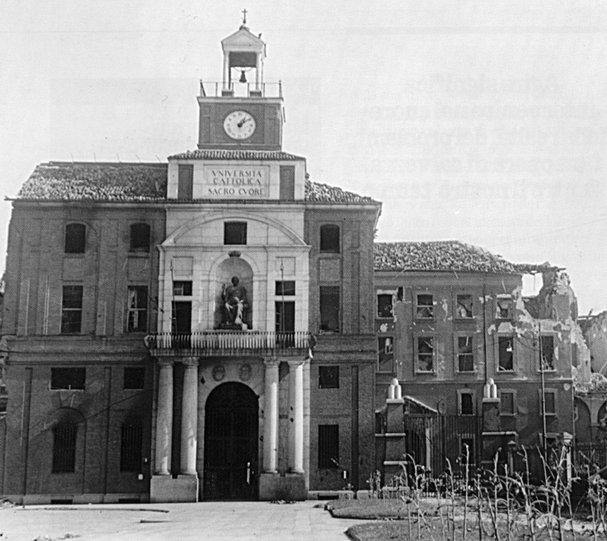
The Cattolica after the bombings

=== World War II ===
During World War II, Ezio Franceschini, who supported the Resistance, organised meetings of the Freedom Volunteer Corps (coordination structure of the partisans) in the university. Towards the end of the war, in 1944, the professor of medieval Latin letters hid, in the basement of Cattolica, a box containing documents and books on the Resistance and FRAMA group founded by Ezio Franceschini. The SS rummaged everywhere in UCSC to find those cards but, buried among the bones of fifty skeletons dead from an epidemic of plague in the sixteenth century, they remained there and emerged only after the war.

The Cattolica was partially destroyed by bombing on 15–16 August 1943, including several classrooms, an administration building, the office building, a cloister by Bramante, an ancient staircase, the hall of honour, and some colleges. The reconstruction work began immediately, moved by the words of Agostino Gemelli "rise again more beautiful and bigger than before".

=== Protests of 1968 ===
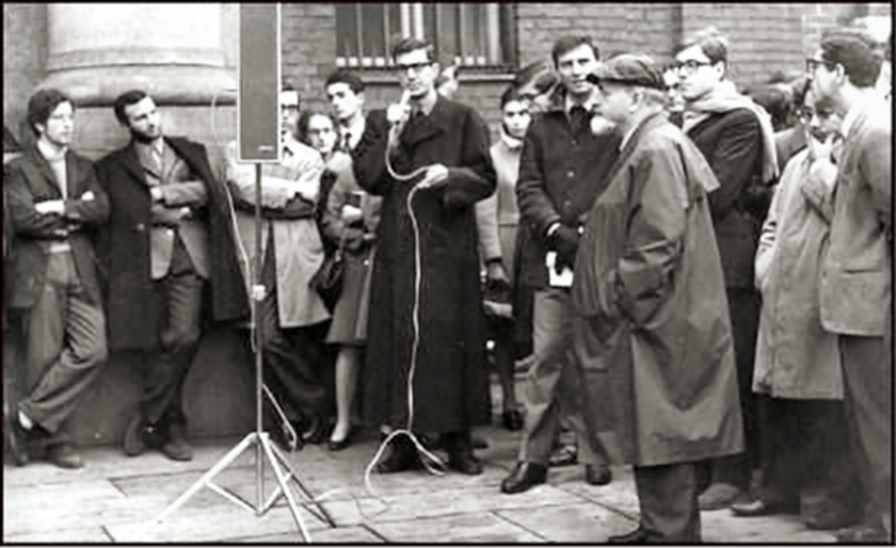
A speech by Mario Capanna in 1967. In the foreground, the rector at the time, Ezio Franceschini.

After the university increased tuition fees on 15 November 1968, protests began at UCSC, Milan, and spread throughout Italy. Students who occupied the university were expelled by the rector Ezio Franceschini with the help of the police led by Commissioner Luigi Calabresi. Three days later, 30,000 students marched through Milan to the archbishop's residence, and the protest spread to every major university in the country. On 21 March, the Cattolica was reoccupied by the police, after being evacuated and closed indefinitely. A few days later, on 25 March, there was the so-called "battle of Largo Gemelli", where thousands of students tried to reopen the university but were strongly repelled by the police. The leader of the protest was Mario Capanna, a student of philosophy at the Università Cattolica.

=== The Italian cabinet of 2011 ===
In November 2011, the Prime Minister Mario Monti appointed three professors as ministers. The rector Lorenzo Ornaghi was appointed minister for heritage and cultural activities; Renato Balduzzi, professor of constitutional law, was appointed minister of health; and Dino Piero Giarda, professor of public economics at the faculty of economics, became minister for relations with Parliament.

After the appointment of Professor Lorenzo Ornaghi as a minister, all the powers and functions belonging to the office of rector were entrusted to the vice-chancellor, Prof. Franco Anelli, for the term of Ornaghi's office.

== Rector ==
The Magnifico Rettore is the most senior post in this institution, elected every 4 years by the board of directors. The role of the Rector is to represent the university and to convene and chair the board of directors, the management committee, the academic senate, and the board of the Agostino Gemelli University Hospital.

== Organization ==
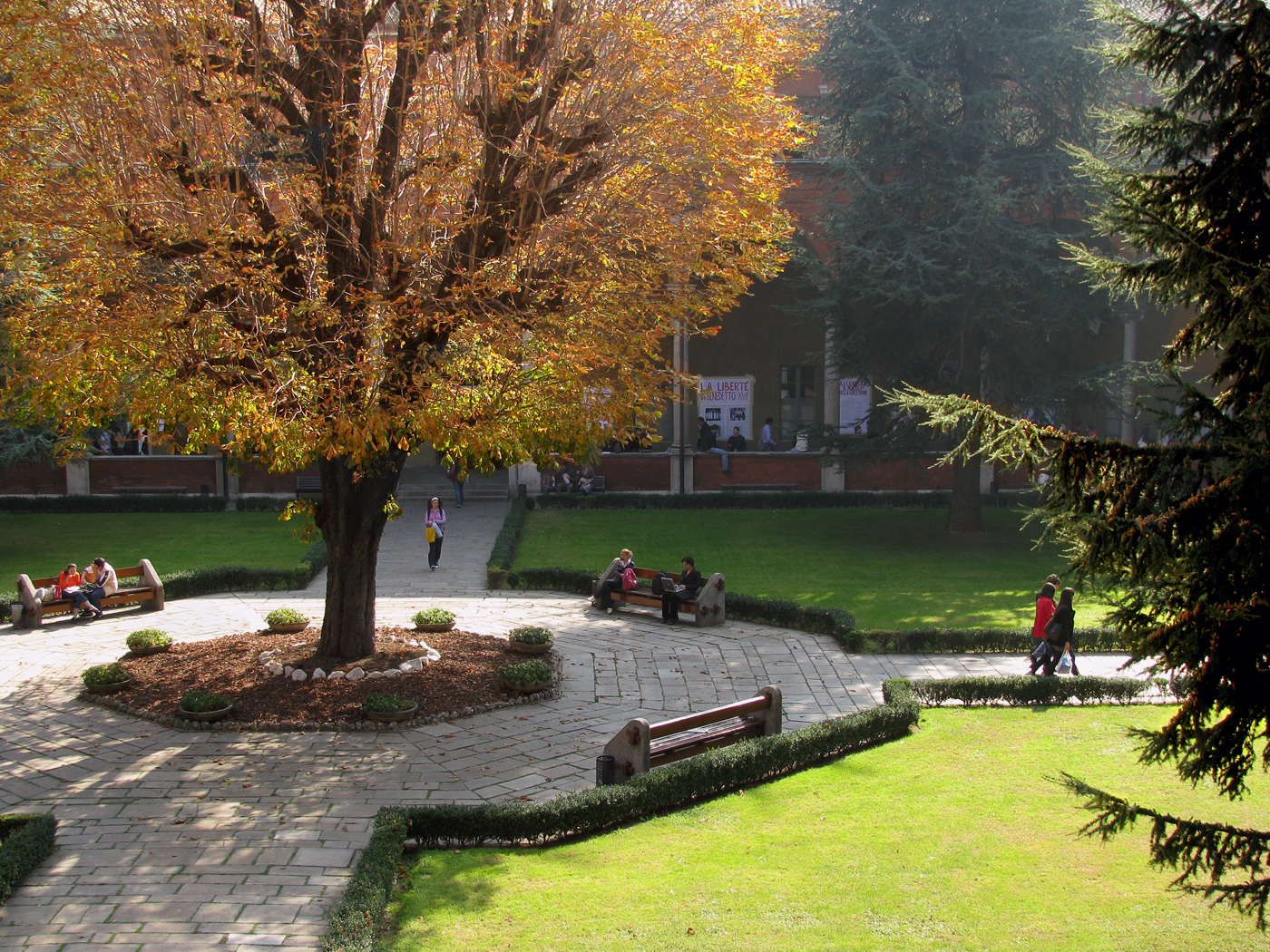
A cloister

=== Schools ===
The UCSC offers a wide range of degrees in 12 faculties.

- Faculty of Agricultural, Food and Environmental Sciences (1951) ‒ Piacenza-Cremona
- Faculty of Arts and Philosophy (1924) ‒ Milan, Brescia
- Faculty of Banking, Finance and Insurance Sciences (1990) ‒ Milan
- Faculty of Economics (1947) ‒ Milan, Rome
- Faculty of Economics and Law (2000) ‒ Piacenza-Cremona
- Faculty of Educational Sciences (1936) ‒ Milan, Brescia, Piacenza
- Faculty of Law (1924) ‒ Milan
- Faculty of Linguistic Sciences and Foreign Literatures (1991) ‒ Milan, Brescia
- Faculty of Mathematics, Physics and Natural Sciences (1968) ‒ Brescia
- Faculty of Medicine and Surgery (1958) ‒ Rome
- Faculty of Political and Social Sciences (1931) ‒ Milan, Brescia
- Faculty of Psychology (1999) ‒ Milan, Brescia

=== Postgraduate Schools ===
Postgraduate Schools (Alte Scuole) are centres of excellence in research and teaching.

- ALMED - Postgraduate School of Media Communications and Performing Arts (2002) ‒ Milan
- ALTIS - Postgraduate School Business & Society (2005) ‒ Milan
- ASA - Postgraduate School of Environmental Studies (2008) ‒ Brescia
- ASAG - Postgraduate School of Psychology Agostino Gemelli (2001) ‒ Milan
- ASERI - Postgraduate School of Economics and International Relations (1995) ‒ Milan
- ALTEMS - Postgraduate School of Health Economics and Management (2009) ‒ Rome
- SMEA - Postgraduate School of Agricultural and Food Economics (1984) ‒ Cremona

== Campuses ==
=== Milan campus ===
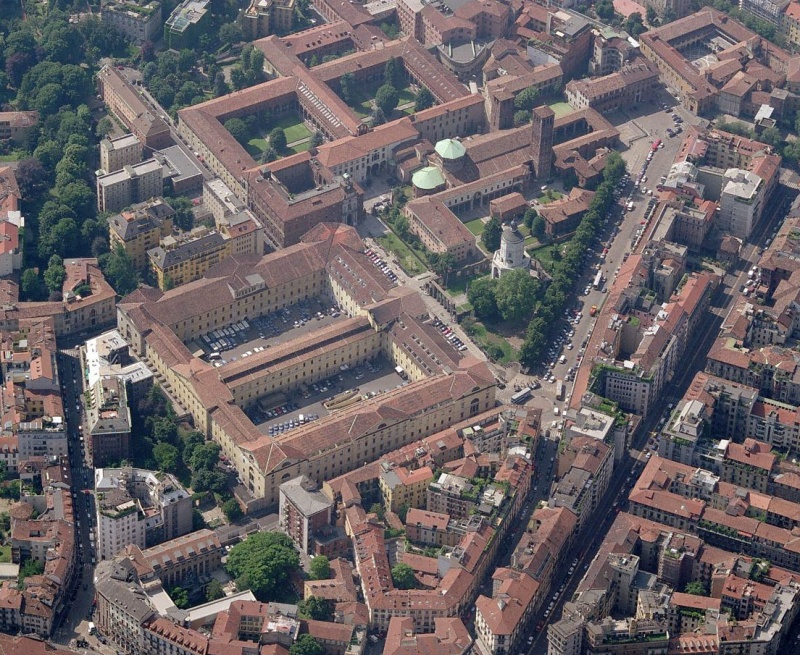
An aerial photograph of the UCSC campus

Cattolica has campuses in six Italian cities, with its seat in the historic Cistercian monastery near the Basilica of Sant'Ambrogio in the heart of Milan. Originally a monastery built by Benedictine monks in the 8th century, the UCSC Milan campus expanded under the care of Cistercian friars in the 15th century and from military and social developments both during the Napoleonic era and World War II.

The restructuring of the Benedictine monastery by Giovanni Muzio in collaboration with the engineer Pier Fausto Barelli began in 1929 and finished twenty years later.

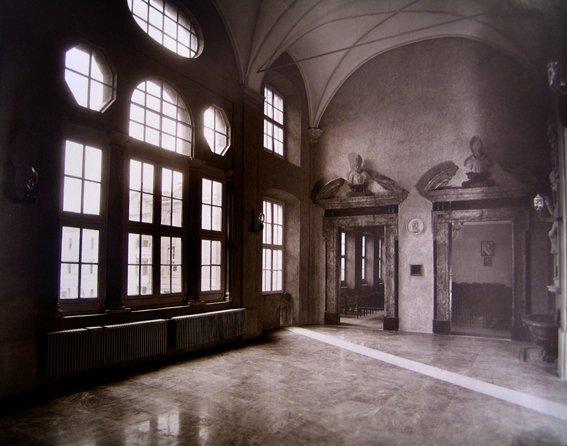
Atrium of the zodiac in 1932

The campus, nestled within the original city walls of Milan, features a façade by Giovanni Muzio, the Chapel of the Sacred Heart, the atrium of the zodiac, and the Great Hall (Aula Magna).

The main section of Gemelli consists of the following buildings: monumental with cloister by Bramante, offices, Gregorianum, Antonianum, Via Lanzone 18, Ambrosianum, Franciscanum, and Domenicanum.

Most of the buildings, colleges, and campus facilities are located in St. Ambrose district, within the city centre of Milan. The seat in Via Necchi 5/9 was the historic seat of the Augustinianum College, containing, in addition to classrooms and offices, the economic institutes, the department of economics and the department of linguistics, library, science, economics, mathematics and statistics, catering services for staff and students, and the Domus restaurant. The seat in Via Carducci 28/30 is located in the Palazzo Gonzaga and was built by Arpesani in a Lombard style, incorporating the existing cloister of St. Jerome. Here is the main office and the office of international relations. The historical site of St. Agnese Catholic is on route 2, consisting of the Palazzo del Canonica. ALMED is located in this building.

=== Satellite campuses ===
The Cattolica is based in Piacenza at the Palace Ghisalberti. The construction of the headquarters of Piacenza, which would house the Faculty of Agriculture, started in 1953 at the bidding of Agostino Gemelli. The headquarters of Piacenza has a sports centre of 8,000 m^{2} called San Martino. The students of UCSC of Piacenza and Cremona participate, under the ASUB student association (Associazione Sportiva University Piacenza), in football, volleyball, basketball, capoeira, and table tennis. The headquarters of Cremona was inaugurated on 19 November 1984, by the academic activities of the SMEA.

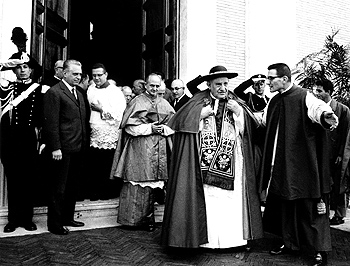
On November 5, 1961, Pope John XXIII solemnized with his presence the birth of the medical school in Rome.

The UCSC 37-hectare medical campus is situated in Rome. In 1934 Pope Pius XI granted Istituto Giuseppe Toniolo di Studi Superiori the property of Monte Mario to construct the buildings of the future Faculty of Medicine, followed by a speech by Pope Pius XII to start the execution phase of the project. In 1958, the Higher Council of Education approved the teaching and scientific project, and on June 18 of that year, with the decree of the President of the Republic, work began on the biological institutes, with classes beginning in November 1961. In 1961, construction began on Agostino Gemelli University Polyclinic, completed in 1964. The Rome campus has 2 faculties, 34 institutes, 18 research centres, and over 7,000 students (5,000 undergraduate and 2,000 graduate).

The Catholic University of Brescia has four facilities distributed in the historic centre of the city. The historic headquarters is located at Via Trieste 17, in the Palazzo Martinengo Cesaresco dell'Aquilone. These were added to the sixteenth-century complex of the Good Shepherd located in Via dei Musei 41, which accommodates classrooms and laboratories for the Faculty of Mathematical, Physical and Natural Sciences. Other venues are located in Contrada Santa Croce 17, Via Aleardo Aleardi 12, and Via San Martino della Battaglia 11, for a total of approximately 23,464 square meters. Some projects in 2007 included the extension of the university with a new headquarters in the northern district of Brescia, for a total of about 20,000 m^{2} of additional space. This includes 25 new classrooms, 16 laboratories, a library, a canteen, study halls, ample spaces for socialisation and sports activities as well as offices for administrative and teaching staff. The new complex should be available by the end of 2018 and will host the Faculty of Mathematics and Physics as well as other graduate courses.

On 19 March 1995 Pope John Paul II laid the foundation stone of the Center for High Technology Research and Education in Biomedical Sciences in Campobasso, which was inaugurated on 16 September 2002. The foundation was later renamed John Paul II Foundation for Research and Treatment. By 2010, the site had more than 700 students enrolled in the bachelor programs for the health professions.

== Academics ==
The programs of the university are accredited by various departments of the Italian Ministry of Education, Universities and Research.

=== Research ===
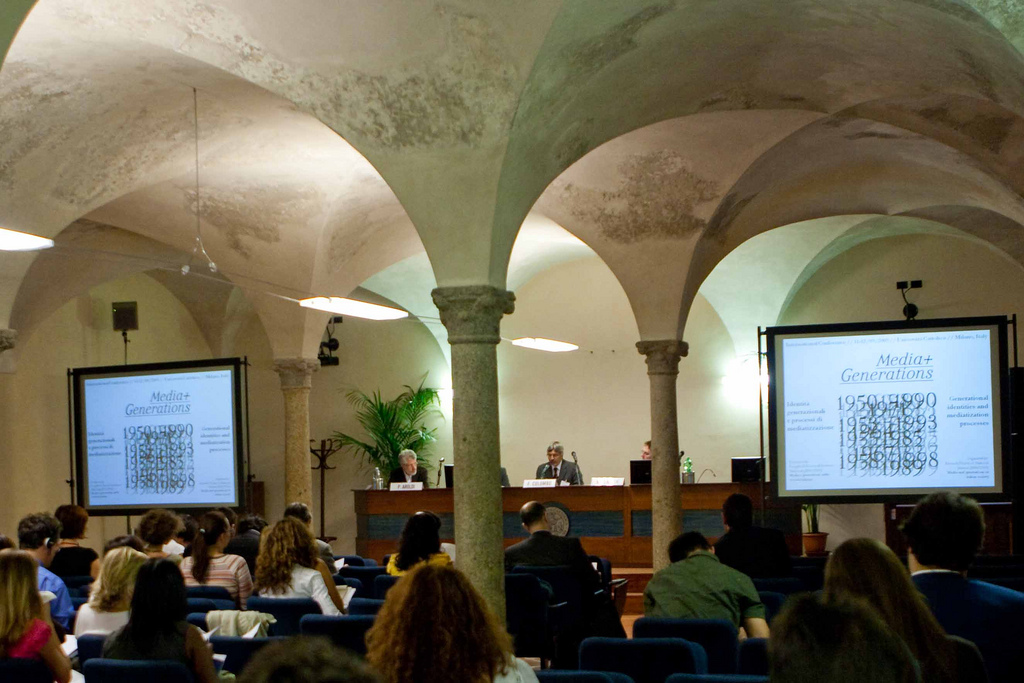
Lesson at UCSC

Research activities of the university included nearly 3,000 research projects underway in 2009 and 4,668 publications and 4 atheneum centres. The research is divided into 22 departments, 54 institutes, and 70 research centres. The 22 departments (if these are added to 16, which refer to the medical care area) are aimed at promoting and coordinating the activities of institutional research and contributing to the organisation of doctoral research (PhD). The atheneum centres were established in 2007 and have structures for the conception, development, and implementation of research projects and training on social issues. The specific fields of focus for the atheneum centres are bioethics, the family, social teaching, and international solidarity.

=== Admissions ===
All schools have a limited number of seats, and most of the schools require an admission test to enrol.

The admission test of the School of Medicine "Agostino Gemelli" is one of the most selective of the university. This test consists of a written test and/or an oral exam. In the admission test in 2017, which took place in Rome and Milan, there were 8907 candidates for 300 seats.

=== Libraries ===
The UCSC Library System works with numerous national and international bodies: IFLA - International Federation of Library Associations and Institutions, AIB; Associazione Italiana Biblioteche, AIDA; Associazione Italiana per la Documentazione Avanzata, NDLTD; Networked Digital Library of Theses and Dissertations, LIBER; Ligue des Bibliothèques Européennes de Recherche, LOCKSS; Lots of Copies Keep Stuff Safe, CLOCKSS; Controlled Lots of Copies Keep Stuff Safe, NEREUS e INNOVATIVE.

=== Rankings & Internationalization ===
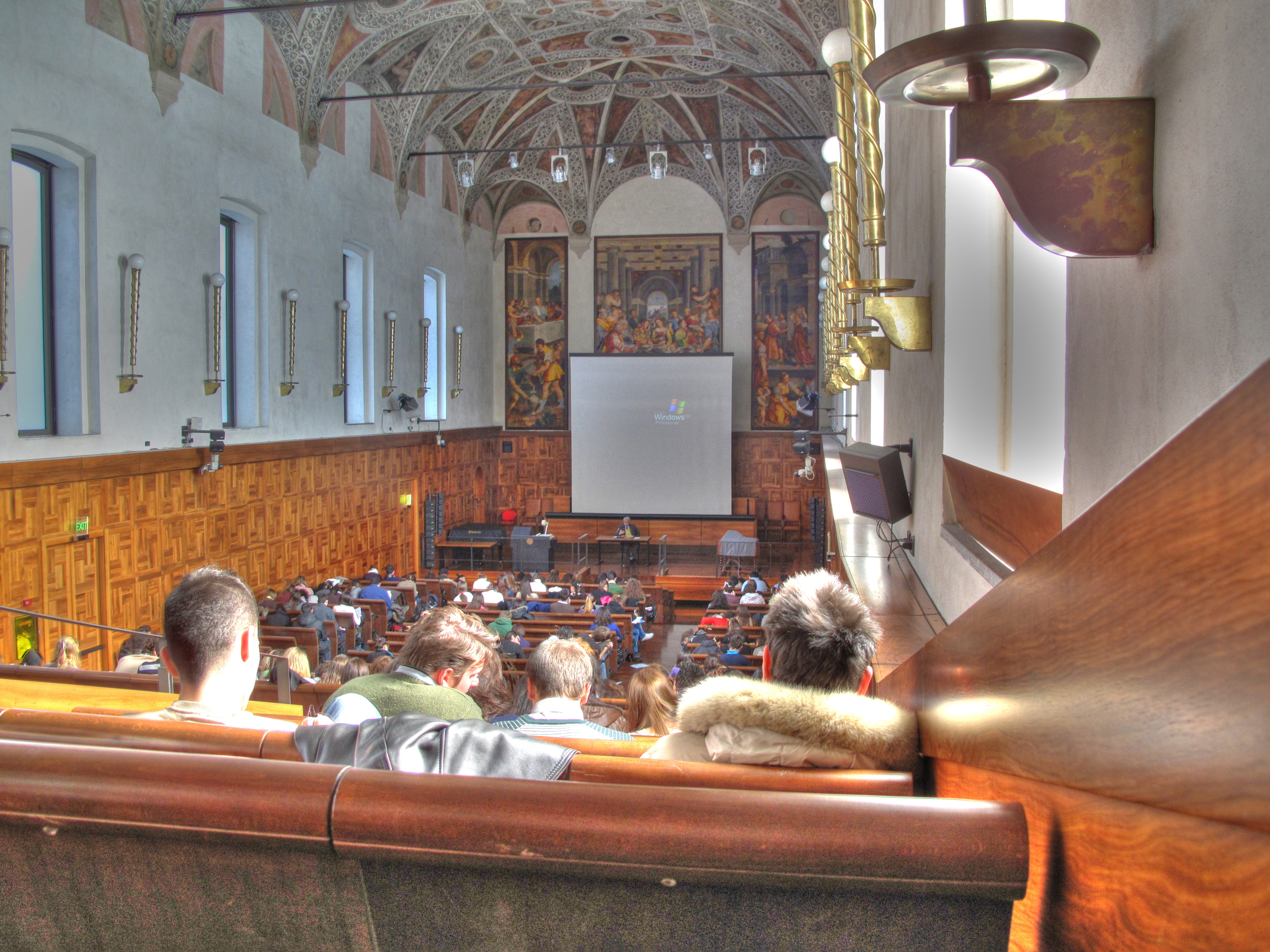
Great Hall

University rankings

Global – Overall
- ARWU World: 401–500 (2024)
- CWTS World: 376 by P (2024)
- QS World: 409 (2026)
- THE World: 301–350 (2025)

The Cattolica, according to a study of the International Student Barometer, a survey of a sample of 65 universities in Europe, is the second in Europe and fourth position at the international level among the most recommended universities by foreign students.

According to QS World University Rankings 2025, Cattolica is ranked 442 overall. Globally by subject, as of 2017, Cattolica is among the top 100 in law and legal studies, top 150 in economics and econometrics, top 180 in agriculture and forestry, top 200 in accounting and finance, top 250 in business and management, etc. In addition, the university is ranked between 81 and 90 in graduate employability. UCSC is a part of a series of international networks including: LLP – Erasmus Network, UCSC International Bilateral Agreements, ISEP Network, International Network of Universities (INU), Fédération des Universités Catholiques Européenes (FUCE), Fédération Internationale des Universités Catholiques (FIUC), and International Partnership of Business Schools (IPBS).

Programs of international mobility that UCSC has with other universities include: UCSC dual degree (London School of Economics, Thomas Jefferson University, Boston University, Bayes Business School, Paris-Sorbonne University, Fordham University, University of North Carolina at Charlotte, Dublin City University, Higher School of Economics), UCSC Exchange Programs (University of Geneva, Waseda University, Maastricht University, Pontifical Catholic University of Chile), Premier Scholars Program (University of California, Los Angeles, University of Chicago), LaTE (University College London, Columbia University), Focused Programs Abroad (Stanford University, Boston University), UCSC International Thesis Scholarship. The university offers internships abroad in cooperation with such institutions as The Intern Group and the Emerald Cultural Institute.

=== EDUCatt ===
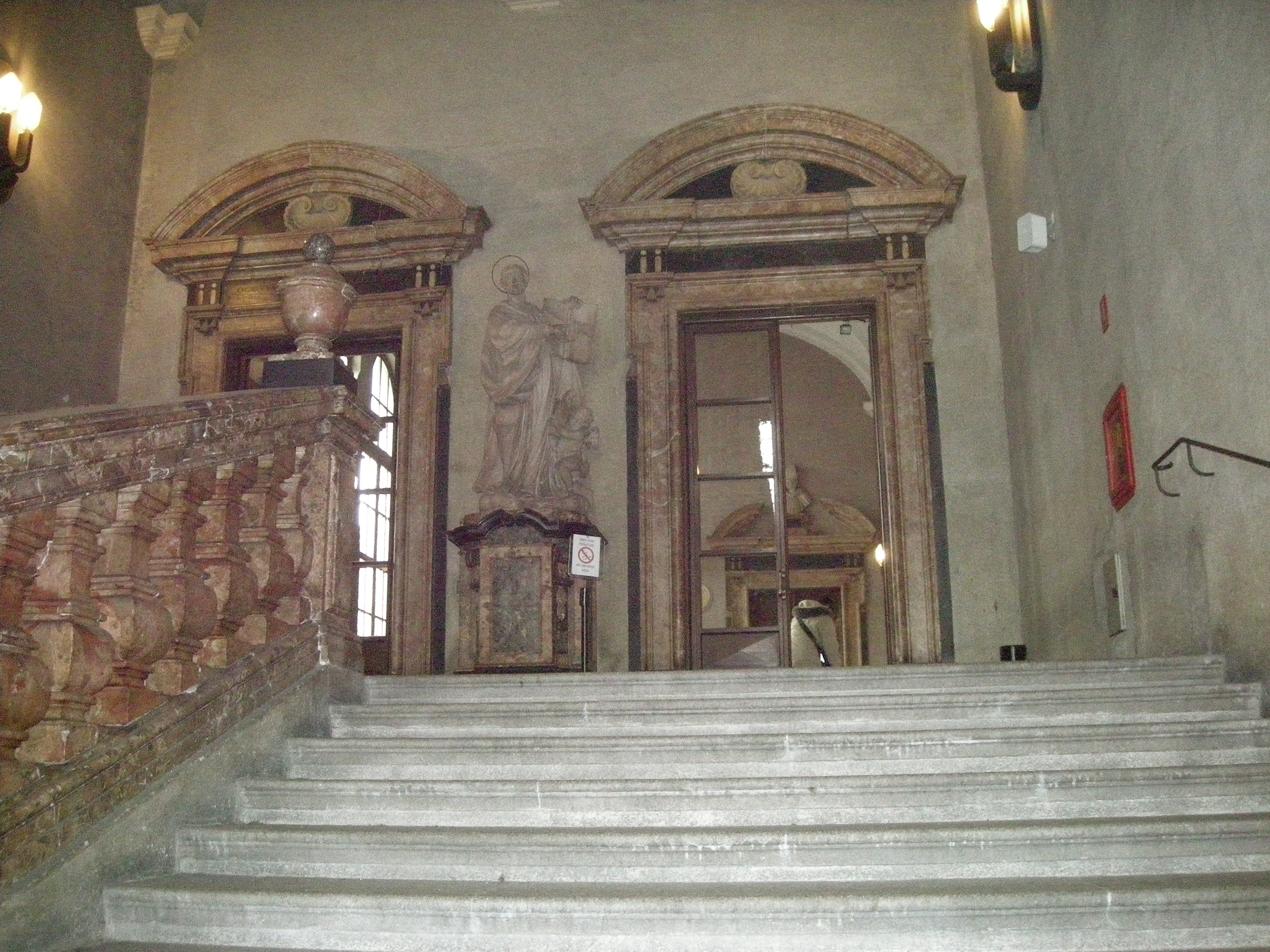
The grand staircase

EDUCatt is the foundation for the right to study at Cattolica University. The foundation focuses on students receiving financial aid and counselling, accommodation, catering, health care, psychological counselling, study trips and cultural activities. EDUCatt deals with the creation of books useful for the study, commissioned by the teachers, taking care of the editing, layout and graphics, to quality control and implementation, also depending on the demands and the type of publication.

== Media ==
The publishing house of UCSC is Vita e pensiero, founded in 1918. The owner is the Istituto Giuseppe Toniolo di Studi Superiori.

The following are the publications and magazines of the UCSC. Vita e pensiero, founded in 1914 by Agostino Gemelli, has been the official magazine of the Cattolica since its inception. Presenza is the UCSC in-house organ, examining topical issues and the latest news of the university. The magazine is divided into two main parts. The first covers services and current affairs, and the second is devoted to news from the headquarters of Cattolica (Milan, Brescia, Piacenza-Cremona and Rome). The magazine is distributed free to faculty, students, graduates, and opinion makers at the national level. Comunicare is a bimonthly magazine, founded in 1990, for the School of Medicine and Surgery of Rome and the Policlinico Agostino Gemelli.

Youcatt, the web TV of the UCSC (Brescia), debuted in September 2009 and is in charge of the university hosted events, foreign experiences of students, and topical issues. It also carries "Books in brief". In 2011 Youcatt won the award Teletopi for the best Italian web TV.

In UCSC, there are some student media like Radio Catt and TV Catt, which were founded in 2012.

== Student life ==
=== Residential colleges ===
Inside the UCSC campus there are some colleges: Augustinianum College (Milan), Marianum College (Milan), Ludovicianum College (Milan), Paolo VI College (Milan), Sant'Isidoro College (Piacenza), Ker Maria College (Rome), San Damiano College (Rome), Nuovo Joanneum College (Rome), San Luca - Armida Barelli College (Rome).

A short distance from the university there are other colleges located in urban areas: Orsoline (Milan), San Francesco (Milan), Stimmatine (Milan), Sacro Cuore Buonarroti (Milan), Franciscanum (Brescia), Sacro Cuore (Brescia), San Giorgio (Brescia), Villa Pace (Brescia), Morigi De Cesaris College (Piacenza), Orsoline (Piacenza), Capitanio (Rome), Renzi (Rome), Romitello (Rome), Sacra Famiglia (Rome).

Ex-alumni of the colleges of the Cattolica have formed associations: Agostini Semper (Augustinianum College) and Associazione Mea (Marianum College).

=== Code of ethics ===
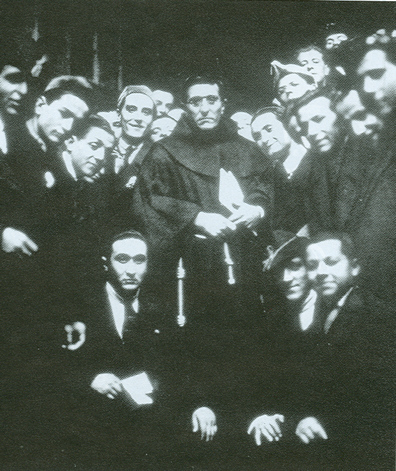
The university's founder, Agostino Gemelli, surrounded by some students.

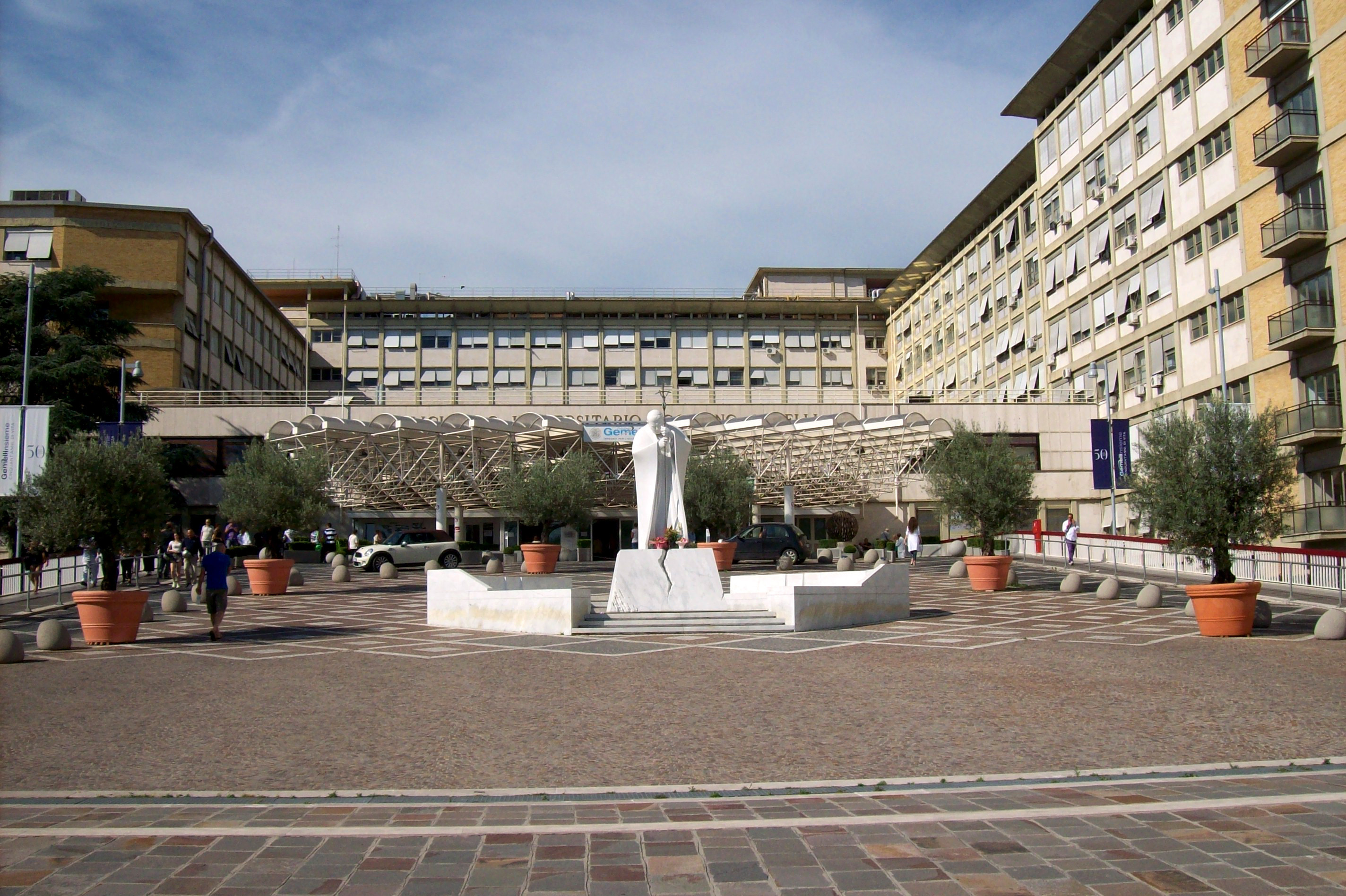
Main entrance to the Agostino Gemelli University Hospital: It serves as the teaching hospital for the medical school of the Università Cattolica del Sacro Cuore.

On 1 November 2011, the code of ethics was introduced. This document contains the values that characterise the Cattolica and the rules of conduct. Each student must sign the code before enrolling. The code is based on principles such as integrity, honesty, legality, solidarity, subsidiarity, hospitality, dialogue, excellence, dignity, the promotion of merit, and individual skills, as well as the prevention and rejection of any unjust discrimination, violence, abuse and improper treatment. The code is formulated to implement the Treaty of Lisbon.

=== Student associations ===
There are many student associations across the five campuses. They organise cultural activities and publish several magazines that are distributed free of charge within the university. Associations are also active, both dealing with intramural matters and looking at social issues.

=== IT services ===
I-Catt is the student home page which contains information about suspended classes, exam schedules, and teachers' notices. Cattolica uses Blackboard Inc. as the e-learning platform on which professors post teaching materials. The telecommunication stations UCPoint & InfoPoint, located on all campuses, perform clerical duties and provide information related to teaching and services. In each location, computer labs and wireless connections are available.

=== Sports ===
The university's sports and activities of the degree course in "Physical Education and Sports" are held in the UCSC sports centre "Rino Fenaroli" of Milan. As of 2011, the teams had won the Milan Collegiate Championships four of the previous five seasons.

The university hosted the IFIUS 2009 World Interuniversity Games in October 2009.

=== Traditions ===
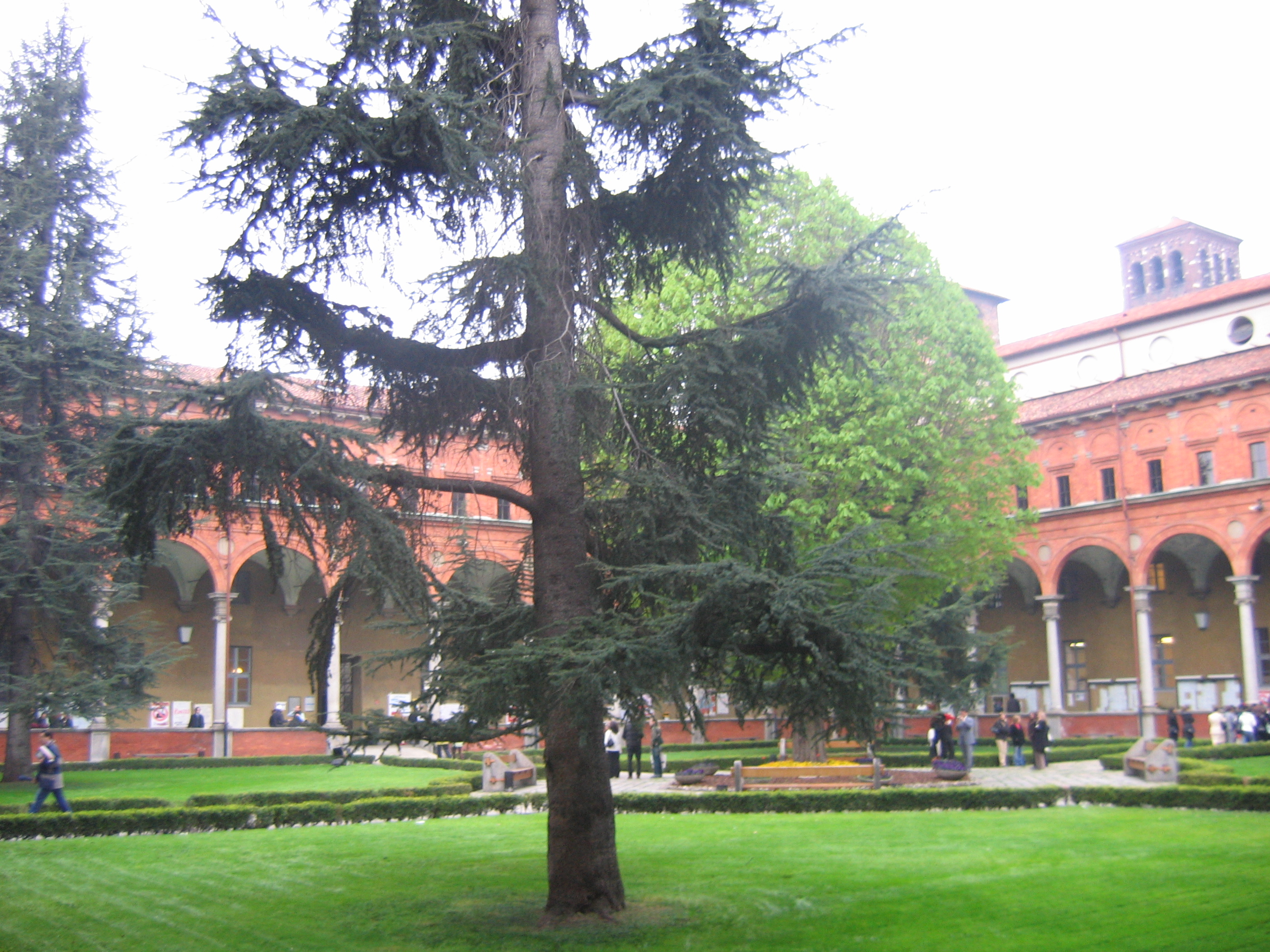
Inner yard

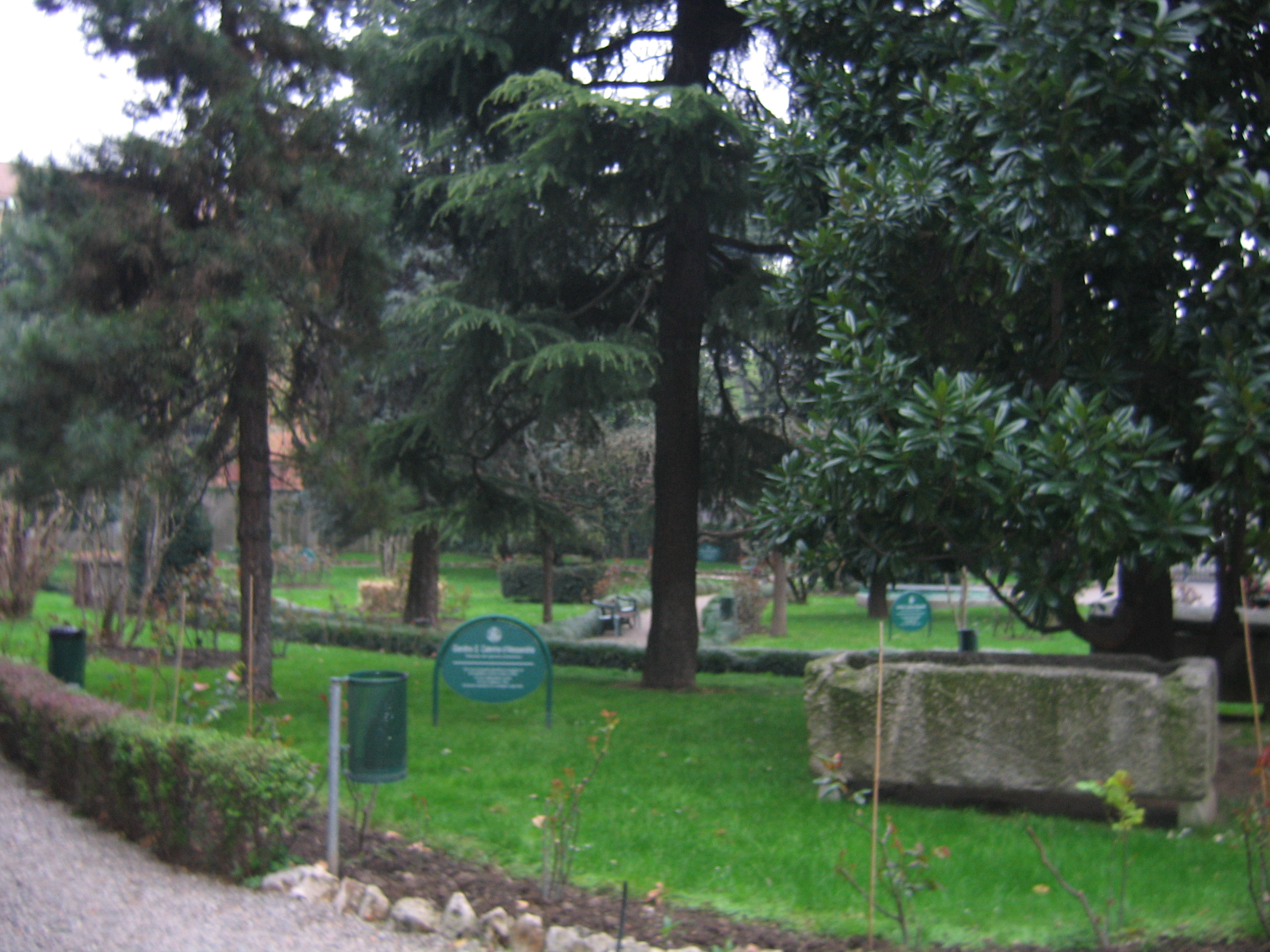
Virgins' garden

In the Milan campus, the garden of St. Catherine of Alexandria is open only to female students. For this reason it is nicknamed "The Virgins' Garden".

During May, the so-called party of the Cattolica Collegiate have a tradition of throwing buckets of water at the freshmen. This rite of passage that has been repeated for several decades is called "nicchiato". Another common tradition of UCSC colleges are the "processes" evenings, which help students let down their defenses and get to better know one another.

== Alumni Cattolica Ludovico Necchi Association ==
The Alumni Cattolica Ludovico Necchi Association was founded in Milan in 1930 and includes all the graduates in the various professional fields of the UCSC. Every year, the Association awards the Agostino Gemelli award, which consists of a medal and a diploma, to the best student of each school.

== Faculty and alumni ==
Cattolica has produced alumni distinguished in their respective fields. Among the best-known people who have attended Università Cattolica are Italian political leaders at Minister-level, such as Oscar Luigi Scalfaro, Ciriaco De Mita, Amintore Fanfani, Giovanni Maria Flick, Romano Prodi, Lorenzo Ornaghi, Cécile Kashetu Kyenge; Italy's first woman cabinet minister, Tina Anselmi; former Governor General of Canada and former Secretary-General of La Francophonie, Michaëlle Jean; banker Angelo Caloia; ENI founder Enrico Mattei; fashion designer Nicola Trussardi; post-Keynesian economist Luigi Pasinetti; religious leaders Paolo Sardi and Angelo Scola; singer Roberto Vecchioni; gymnast Igor Cassina and among its young alumni the internet entrepreneur Augusto Marietti.

Among its most famous faculty members are banker Giovanni Bazoli, archaeologist Valerio Massimo Manfredi, Communion and Liberation founder Luigi Giussani, international relations scholar Michael Cox, economist Massimo Beber, and theorist of international relations and United States foreign policy John Ikenberry. it also includes famous sport journalist Fabrizio Romano.

== In fiction and popular culture ==
In the Manzoni classroom, an advertisement for Pocket Coffee was filmed and broadcast on national networks for several years.

The mystery of Cattolica is the name of the famous unsolved murder of Simonetta Ferrero, which happened on 24 July 1971, at the Cattolica University of Milan. On 28 April 1999, the third episode of the second series of the television programme Blue was devoted to the mystery, by Carlo Lucarelli.

== See also ==
- List of Italian universities
- List of modern universities in Europe (1801–1945)
- Agostino Gemelli
- Cloisters of Sant'Ambrogio
- Murder of Simonetta Ferrero, 1971 unsolved murder on campus
