= SMEA =

SMEA may stand for:

- Small and Medium Enterprise Administration, a government agency in Taiwan.
- Graduate School of Agri-Food Management and Economics, a graduate school in Cremona, Italy.
- Standard Modern Eastern Armenian
- Sony Music Entertainment Australia
