= Fattal =

Fattal is a surname. Notable people with the surname include:

- Hubert Fattal (1970–2022), Lebanese businessman
- Isidore Fattal (1886–1961), Catholic bishop
- Joshua Fattal, US hiker detained by Iran in 2009
- Michel Fattal (born 1954), French-language author
- Simone Fattal (born 1942), Syrian-American artist
- Wahid El Fattal (born 1978), Lebanese football player and coach

== See also ==
- Fatal (disambiguation)
