= Antonia Mesina =

Italian murder victim and saint

Blessed Antonia Mesina
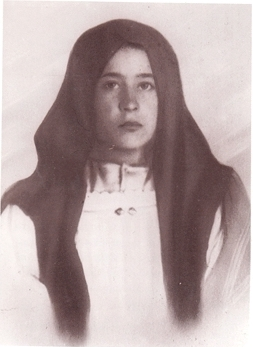

Virgin and martyr
- Born: 21 June 1919; Orgosolo, Sardinia
- Died: 17 May 1935 (aged 15); Orgosolo, Sardinia, Kingdom of Italy
- Venerated in: Catholic Church
- Beatified: 4 October 1987, Saint Peter's Square by Pope John Paul II
- Feast: 17 May

Antonia Mesina (21 June 1919 – 17 May 1935) was a 15 year old Italian Roman Catholic and part of Catholic Action. Mesina was murdered in mid-1935 after she attempted to fend off a would-be rapist and suffered 74 strikes with a stone before she died. She was beatified in 1987.

== Life ==
Antonia Mesina was born in Orgosolo on 21 June 1919 as the second of ten children born to the poor policeman Agostino Mesina and Grazia Rubanu. She was baptized in the local parish church of Saint Peter. She received her Confirmation on 10 November 1920 and received her First Communion in 1926 from the local bishop.

Once she completed her initial education - which spanned a brief period of time - she took over housekeeping at home in order to assist her bedridden mother who suffered from a heart condition. She took care of the household including the care of her siblings as well as cooking and cleaning and washing. Mesina joined Catholic Action movement in 1929 and became a noted recruiter. Mesina liked to be part of this movement and believed that it "helps one to be good".

Mesina set off for Mass one morning with a friend and after that went to gather firewood in mid-1935 when 19 year old Giovanni Ignazio Catigu (1916-1937) attacked her and tried to rape her. Her friend screamed and ran off to find help. Mesina managed to escape twice, but on her third attempt he knocked her down. Mesina defended herself and Catigu murdered because she resisted his violence, striking her with a rock. Mesina’s autopsy found seventy-four wounds, but no trace of rape. Catigu was soon apprehended and on 27 April 1937 sentenced to death; the firing squad executed him on the following 5 August.

On 5 October 1935 the Catholic Action member Armida Barelli, who had met Mesina once, met with Pope Pius XI and informed him of Mesina's activism and her murder.

== Beatification ==
The beatification process commenced in the Diocese of Nuoro on 17 April 1979 and closed it on 11 March 1985. Pope John Paul II approved the fact that Mesina had died "in defensum castitatis" on 8 May 1987 and therefore of approved her beatification. He beatified Mesina on 4 October 1987 in Saint Peter's Square.
