= Presenza =

Presenza is the house organ of Università Cattolica del Sacro Cuore.

== History ==
This magazine was founded in 1969 in Milan. Currently, this magazine is produced in collaboration with the School of Journalism of the University (ALMED - Postgraduate School of Media Communications and Performing Arts). The director of the magazine is Lorenzo Ornaghi.

== See also ==
- List of magazines in Italy
