= Fatal =

Fatal is to cause death. It may also refer to:

== Music ==
- Fatal (album), by Hussein Fatal, 2002
- "Fatal" (song), a song by Gemn (Kento Nakajima and Tatsuya Kitani), 2024
- "Fatal", a song by Motionless in White from Infamous, 2012
- "Fatal", a song by Pearl Jam from Lost Dogs, 2003
- Fatal Recordings, a record label founded by Hanin Elias

== People ==
- Hussein Fatal (1973–2015), American rapper
- Fatal, a rapper who collaborated with the band Therapy? on the song "Come and Die" from the Judgment Night film soundtrack

== Other uses ==
- F.A.T.A.L., a tabletop role-playing game released in 2003
- Fatal, a 2010 French film starring Michaël Youn and Stéphane Rousseau

== See also ==
- Fatale (disambiguation)
- Fatalis (disambiguation)
- Fatalism, a philosophical doctrine
- Fate (disambiguation)
- Fattal, a surname
- Lethal (disambiguation)
- Death, the foreboding of
