= Augustinianum College =

University housing

Coordinates: 45°27′47.25″N 9°10′38.34″E

The Augustinianum College (Italian: Collegio Augustinianum) is a college founded in Milan, Italy in 1933 (92 years ago) by Agostino Gemelli, in order to offer the opportunity to study at Università Cattolica del Sacro Cuore to the most capable among the resident students, providing a bed during their university studies.

== Notable alumni ==
- Giuseppe Dossetti
- Amintore Fanfani
- Giovanni Maria Flick
- Luigi Gui
- Mario Mauro
- Ciriaco De Mita
- Paolo Prodi
- Romano Prodi
