= Lethal (disambiguation) =

That which is lethal is capable of causing death.

Lethal may also refer to:

== Film ==
- Lethal (film), a 2004 action thriller

== Music ==
- DJ Lethal (born 1972), Latvian musician
- Lethal (American band), an American heavy metal band
- Lethal (Argentine band), an Argentine heavy metal band
- Lethal (UTFO album), 1987
- Lethal (Cockney Rejects album), 1990
- Lethal (Rico Nasty album), 2025

== People ==
- Jay Lethal (born 1985), American professional wrestler
- "Lethal" Larry Cameron (1952–1993) former American professional football player and wrestler
- Leigh Matthews (born 1952), Australian rules footballer known as "Lethal Leigh"

== See also ==
- Deadly (disambiguation)
- Fatal (disambiguation)
- Lethal Weapon (disambiguation)
