= Paolo VI College =

The Paolo VI College (Italian: Collegio Paolo VI) is a building of the Università Cattolica del Sacro Cuore, built in the 1960s with aid from the legacy of Pope Paul IV.

The building project was designed by Gio Ponti and is part of an architectural complex, that also includes the church of the parish "St. Francis of Assisi". Building started in 1961 and was completed in 1964. Initially the task was entrusted to Giovanni Muzio, who had already designed various structures of the Catholic University of Sacred Heart, but his plans were shelved.
