= Postgraduate School for Environmental Studies =

- Other names: ASA
- Type: Private
- Established: 2008
- Affiliations: Università Cattolica del Sacro Cuore
- Dean: Pierluigi Malavasi
- Location: Brescia, Lombardy, Italy
- Campus: Urban
- Website: asa.unicatt.it

The Postgraduate School for Environmental Studies (Italian: Alta Scuola per l'Ambiente, or ASA) is a high school education of the Università Cattolica del Sacro Cuore specializing in issues concerning environmental issues and the economic, cultural and social changes. The school, founded in 2008, is headquartered in Brescia.

== Master's degrees ==
ASA offers two master's degrees:

- Human Development and environment. Governance, Education, Scientific Knowledge
- Food management and green marketing
