= Michel Fattal =

French-language author

Michel Fattal (born in 1954 in Alexandria, Egypt) is a French-language author whose works are translated into Italian and Polish.

Michel Fattal treats statute of Logos (language, reason) in Greek Philosophy. The works of Heraclitus and Aristotle, of Parmenides, Plato, Chrysippus and Plotinus are also sources of inspiration to him. He is the author of several books on Plato, Plotinus and the neoplatonic tradition (Augustine, Farâbî).

Michel Fattal, professor (MCF, since 1994) authorized to direct research (HDR, since 2001) in ancient and medieval philosophy at the University of Grenoble Alpes, has been Professor Emeritus since September 1, 2023. The Emeritus was awarded to him by the research commission of the University of Grenoble Alpes.

He is also (since 2014) a permanent visiting professor (Permanent fellow) in ancient philosophy at the UNESCO "Archai" Chair promoting research on the origins of Western thought.

The Charles Lyon Caen Prize was awarded by the Academy of Moral and Political Sciences at the Institut de France (Paris) on November 17, 2014, for his work: Plato and Plotinus. Relation, Logos, Intuition, Paris, L'Harmattan, 2013

Since December 13, 2024, he has been a full member of the Academy of Sciences, Belles Lettres and Arts of Savoy.

== Bibliography ==
- For a new language of reason. Convergences between Orient and Occident, Preface of Pierre Aubenque, Paris, Beauchesne, Bibliothèque des Archives de Philosophie, 50, 1988.
- Per un nuovo linguaggio della ragione. Convergenze tra Oriente e Occidente, Italian translation, Cinesello Balsamo (Milano), San Paolo, Universo Filosofia, 1999.
- Logos. Miedzy Orientem A Zachodem, Polish translation, Warsaw, Wydawnctwo Ifis Pan (Institute of Philosophy and Sociology of the Polish Academy of Sciences), 2001.
- Logos and image in Plotinus, Paris-Montreal, L’Harmattan, 1998.
- Studies on Plotinus, Paris-Montreal, L’Harmattan, 2000.
- The Philosophy of Plato 1, Paris-Budapest-Turin, L’Harmattan, Ouverture Philosophique, 2001.
- Logos, Thought and Truth in Greek Philosophy, Paris-Montreal-Budapest-Turin, L’Harmattan, Ouverture Philosophique, 2003.
- Logos and language in Plotinus and before Plotinus, Paris, L’Harmattan, Ouverture Philosophique, 2003.
- The Philosophy of Plato 2, Paris-Budapest-Turin, L’Harmattan, « Ouverture Philosophique », 2005.
- Ricerche sul logos da Omero a Plotino, Italian translation, Milano, Vita e pensiero, Temi metafisici e problemi del pensiero antico. Studi e testi, 99, 2005.
- Plotinus in Augustine. Followed by Plotinus against the Gnostics, Paris-Budapest-Turin, L’Harmattan, Ouverture Philosophique, 2006.
- Plotinus in front of Plato. Followed by Plotinus in Augustine and Al-Farabi, Paris, L’Harmattan, Ouverture Philosophique, 2007.
- Plotino, gli Gnostici e Agostino, Italian translation of Plotinus in Front of Plato, Napoli, Loffredo Editore, Skepsis, 20, 2008.
- Aristote et Plotin dans la Philosophie Arabe, L'Harmattan, Paris, Ouverture Philosophique, 2008.
- Image, Mythe, Logos et Raison, L'Harmattan, Paris, Ouverture Philosophique, 2009.
- Le langage chez Platon. Autour du Sophiste, L'Harmattan, Paris, Ouverture Philosophique, 2009.
- Saint Paul face aux philosophes épicuriens et stoïciens, L'Harmattan, Paris, Ouverture Philosophique, 2010.
- Paroles et actes chez Héraclite. On the theoretical foundations of moral action, L'Harmattan, Paris, Ouverture Philosophique, 2011.
- Platon et Plotin. Relation, Logos, Intuition, L'Harmattan, Paris, Ouverture Philosophique, 2013
- Paul de Tarse et le Logos, Commentaire philosophique de 1 Corinthiens, 1, 17-2, 16, Paris, L'Harmattan, Ouverture Philosophique,2014, ISBN 978-2-343-03032-6.
- Du Logos de Plotin au Logos de saint Jean. Vers la solution d'un problème métaphysique ?, Paris, Editions du Cerf,"Alpha". 2014.ISBN 978-2-204-10311-4.
- Existence et Identité, Logos et technê chez Plotin, L'Harmattan, Paris, Ouverture Philosophique, 2015. (ISBN 978-2-343-04855-0).
- Du Bien et de la Crise, Platon, Parménide et Paul de Tarse, L'Harmattan, Ouverture Philosophique, 2016 (ISBN 978-2-343-08612-5).
- Augustin, Penseur de la Raison? (Lettre 120, à Consensius), L'Harmattan, Ouverture Philosophique, 2016 (ISBN 978-2-343-09931-6).
- Du Logos de Plotin au Logos de saint Jean : vers la solution d'un problème métaphysique ? Paris, Les Editions du Cerf, "Alpha", 2014; rééd. Paris, Les Editions du Cerf, "Cerf Patrimoines", 2016 (ISBN 978-2-204-10967-3)
- Conversion et Spiritualités dans l'Antiquité et au Moyen Âge L'Harmattan, Ouverture Philosophique, 2017 (ISBN 978-2-343-12582-4)
- Separation et Relation chez Platon et chez Plotin L'Harmattan, Ouverture Philosophique, 2022 (ISBN 9782343255071)
