= Femme Fatale =

Femme Fatale(s) may refer to:

- Femme fatale, an archetypal character of literature and art of a woman who is both seductive and dangerous

== Film and television ==
- Femme Fatale (1991 film), an American drama starring Colin Firth
- Femme Fatale (2002 film), a film directed by Brian De Palma
- Femme Fatale, Jang Hee-bin, a 1968 South Korean film
- Femme Fatale: Bae Jeong-ja, a 1973 South Korean film
- Femme Fatales (TV series), a 2011–2012 Cinemax anthology series
- Supermodel Me: Femme Fatale, season 4 of the Asian reality series Supermodel Me

== Literature ==
- Femme Fatales (comics), a group of Marvel Comics supervillains
- Femme Fatales (magazine), a 1992–2008 American men's magazine
- Femme Fatales, a 2009 Iron Man novel by Robert Greenberger

== Music ==
- Femme Fatale (band), an American hard rock band

=== Albums ===
- Femme Fatale (Akina Nakamori album), 1988
- Femme Fatale (Britney Spears album), 2011
  - Femme Fatale Tour, a 2011 concert tour
- Femme Fatale (Femme Fatale album), 1988
- Femme Fatale (Gábor Szabó album) or the title song, 1981
- Femme Fatale (Miki Howard album), 1992
- Femme Fatale (Mon Laferte album), 2025
  - Femme Fatale Vol. 2, 2026 followup
- Femme Fatale: The Aura Anthology, by Nico, 2003

=== Songs ===
- "Femme Fatale" (song), by The Velvet Underground, 1966
- "Femme Fatale", by Evdokia Kadi, Cyprus' entry at the 2008 Eurovision song contest
- "Femme Fatale", by G-Eazy featuring Coi Leray and Kaliii, 2024

== Other uses ==
- Femme fatale fireflies or Photuris, a genus of lampyrid beetle
- Femmes Fatales, an independent women's professional wrestling promotion
