= Murder of Simonetta Ferrero =

1971 unsolved murder case in Milan, Italy

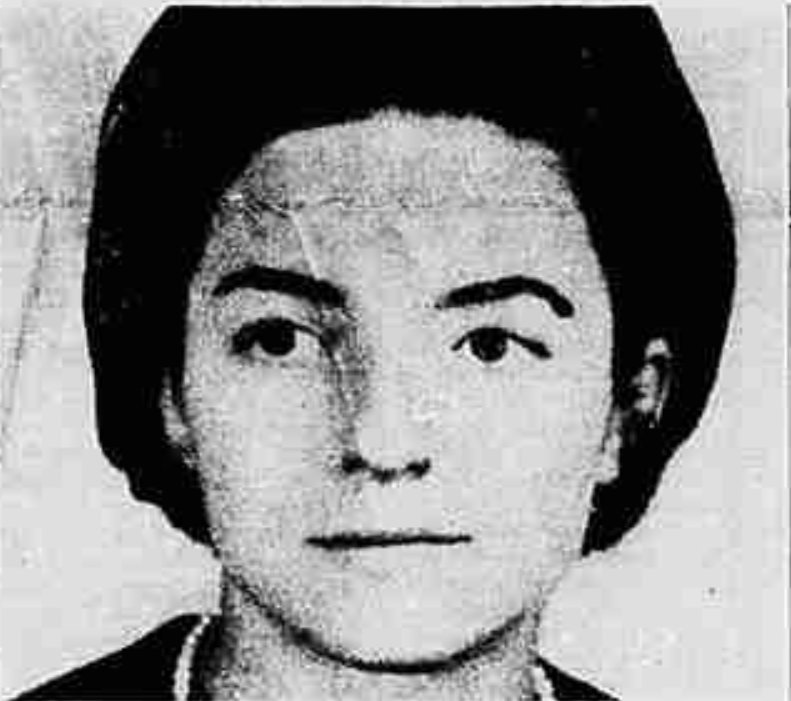
- Murder victim Simonetta Ferrero
- Location: Università Cattolica del Sacro Cuore
- Date: 24 July 1971
- Attack type: Murder
- Weapon: Blade

The murder of Simonetta Ferrero, also known as the Università Cattolica case, is an unsolved murder case that took place in 1971 in Milan, Italy. It refers to the yet unsolved murder of twenty-six year old Simonetta Ferrero, found lifeless in a women's bathroom at the Catholic University of Milan.

Despite various investigative hypotheses formulated by investigators (including that of a serial killer, acting in connection to other cases), the case remained unsolved.
