= Istituto Giuseppe Toniolo di Studi Superiori =

The Istituto Giuseppe Toniolo di Studi Superiori is the agency founder and promoter of the Università Cattolica del Sacro Cuore. The institute is situated in Milan, near the UCSC's campus; the name of the institute is dedicated to Giuseppe Toniolo, who conceived the idea of Cattolica University.

== History ==
In 1919 Father Agostino Gemelli, Ludovico Necchi, Francesco Olgiati, Armida Barelli, and Ernesto Lombardo founded the institute. On June 24, 1920, the institute was legally recognized with a decree signed by the Minister of Education, Benedetto Croce; at the same time, the Pope Benedict XV officially recognized the university's ecclesiastical status. On November 25, 1920, the Institute Toniolo received canonical recognition of the Cattolica, which was inaugurated in 1921.

== See also ==
- Giuseppe Toniolo
