= Postgraduate School of Psychology Agostino Gemelli =

- Alta Scuola di Psicologia Agostino Gemelli
- Other names: ASAG
- Type: Private
- Established: 2000
- Affiliations: Università Cattolica del Sacro Cuore
- Dean: Vittorio Cigoli
- Location: Milan, Lombardy, Italy
- Campus: Urban
- Website: asag.unicatt.it

The Postgraduate School of Psychology Agostino Gemelli (Italian: Alta Scuola di Psicologia Agostino Gemelli, or ASAG) is a specializing school of Università Cattolica del Sacro Cuore. Founded in 2000, the school is situated in Via Nirone 15 in Milan, on the campus of the University. On April 26, 2009, in celebration of the fiftieth anniversary of the death of the founder of the Catholic University, was made an exhibit in the school on the tools used by Agostino Gemelli.

== Master's degrees ==
The master's degrees offered by the school are:

- Qualitative Methods Applied to Social and Marketing Research
- Clinical Psychology in Medical Settings
- Clinical Master in the Relationship of the Couple
- Artistic Languages in Clinical Psychology
- Psychogeriatrics: Clinical and Community Perspective
- Family and Community Mediation
- Psychological Interventions at School
- Emergency Contest: the Relational Approach
