= Graduate School of Health Economics and Management =

- Alta Scuola di Economia e Management dei Sistemi Sanitari
- Other names: ALTEMS
- Type: Private
- Established: 2008
- Affiliations: Università Cattolica del Sacro Cuore
- Dean: Americo Cicchetti
- Location: Rome, Lazio, Italy
- Campus: Urban
- Website: altems.unicatt.it

The Graduate School of Health Economics and Management (Italian: Alta Scuola di Economia e Management dei Sistemi Sanitari, or ALTEMS) is a graduate school at the Università Cattolica del Sacro Cuore established in 2008 located in Italy.

== Master's degrees ==
The School offers master's degrees:

- Organizzazione e gestione delle aziende e dei servizi sanitari
- Valutazione e gestione delle tecnologie sanitarie
- Pharmacy management - Organizzazione e gestione della farmacia
- Esperto giuridico per l'azienda sanitaria
- Management delle impresse biomediche e biotecnologiche
- Competenze e servizi giuridici in sanità
