= Deadly =

Deadly may refer to:

- Deadliness, the ability to cause death

== Arts and entertainment ==
- Deadly, a 2011 novel by Julie Chibbaro
- Deadly, a children's book series by Morris Gleitzman and Paul Jennings
- Deadly (Australian TV series), an Australian children's television cartoon series (2006-2010)
- Deadly (film), a 1991 Australian film
- Deadly (franchise), a British wildlife TV documentary series
- Deadly Awards, also known as The Deadlys, awards for excellence given to Indigenous Australians for achievement in music, sport, entertainment and community
- Deadly film series, an Indian Kannada-language film series including
  - Deadly Soma (2005)
  - Deadly-2 (2010)
- Karla (film), a 2006 American movie originally titled Deadly

== Other uses ==
- Alan Dedicoat (born 1954), BBC announcer nicknamed "Deadly"
- Deadly, a word in Aboriginal Australian English meaning excellent, similar to "wicked" or "awesome" in English slang

== See also ==
- Lethal (disambiguation)
- Deadly Nannas, Australian singing group
- Uncle Deadly (Muppet), a Muppets character
- "Too Deadly", an episode of Wapos Bay
