= Deadly Weapon (disambiguation) =

A deadly weapon is an item that can inflict mortal or great bodily harm.

- Deadly Weapon, a 1989 American science fiction film
- Deadly Weapons, a 1974 American exploitation film
- Deadly Weapons (album), a 1986 album by Steve Beresford, John Zorn, Tonie Marshall and David Toop
- "Deadly Weapons", a song by Eyes Set to Kill from the 2009 album The World Outside

== See also ==
- Lethal Weapon (disambiguation)
