= Armida Barelli =

Italian activist, editor (1882–1952)

Blessed Armida Barelli OFS
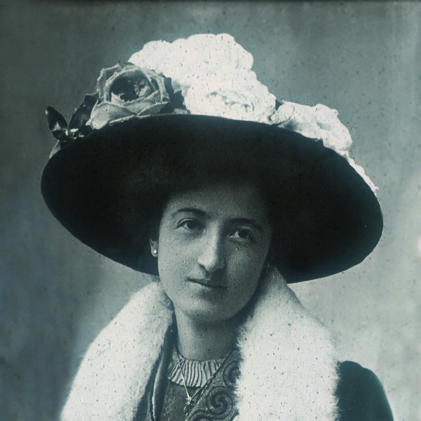
- Born: 1 December 1882; Milan, Kingdom of Italy
- Died: 15 August 1952 (aged 69); Marzio, Varese, Italy
- Venerated in: Roman Catholic Church
- Beatified: 30 April 2022, Santa Maria Nascente, Milan, Italy by Cardinal Marcello Semeraro
- Feast: 19 November

Armida Barelli (1 December 1882 – 15 August 1952) was an Italian Roman Catholic laywoman who served in the educational field during her life and was also a professed member of the Secular Franciscan Order. Barelli was also the co-founder of the Secular Institute of the Missionaries of the Kingship of Christ. Alongside Agostino Gemelli the pair sought to spread the message of the Gospel through their educational facilities and through the secular instititue that sought also to spread the Franciscan charism.

Barelli's cause for beatification commenced in 1960 and advanced on 1 June 2007 when Pope Benedict XVI declared her to be venerable due to her heroic virtue. Pope Francis approved a miracle attributed to her intercession, and Barelli was beatified in Milan on 30 April 2022.

== Life ==
Armida Barelli was born into the upper class on 1 December 1882 in Milan to Napoleon Barelli and Savina Candiani; her siblings were brothers Gino and Fausto and sisters Maria, Gemma, and Vittoria.

Barelli studied in Milan under the Ursulines and then travelled to Menzingen in Switzerland where she studied in a boarding school under the Franciscan Sisters of the Holy Cross from 1895 to 1900. It was during her time with the Franciscans that she discovered her vocation and the Franciscan charism. This linked with her ardent desire to deepen her relationship with God and to devote herself to His work.

From 1900 until 1908 she received proposals from her parents to wed but despite this she decided to devote herself to others and in particular wished to cater to the needs of the poor and the orphaned.

In 1910 she met Agostino Gemelli who guided her towards an active apostolate and introduced her to the fullness of the charism of the Secular Franciscan Order. Barelli became a professed member of the order in 1910. During World War I in 1917 she became a translator of German of articles for the Journal of Philosophy Neoscholasticism that Gemelli had founded that very same year. She came to the attention of the Archbishop of Milan, Andrea Carlo Ferrari, who recognized her for her organizational skills and her moral qualities. She met with Ferrari in a private audience on 17 February 1918 and later that year selected as her motto: "I trust you" as an expression of trust in God. Barelli later became the Vice President for Social Action of the Milan Committee of Catholic Women and also served as the administrator of the Life and Thought publication.

Pope Benedict XV received her in a private audience on 28 September 1918 and appointed her as the president of the National Girls' Youth of Catholic Action and held that post until 1946. It was her original wish to serve in the missions despite the pope's insistence that her mission was in Italy. With Gemelli in 1919 in Assisi she established the Third Order Franciscan Sisters of the Social Kingship of the Sacred Heart. Barelli opened a home for the poor in northern China as well as an institute for religious vocations in 1920 and in 1921 founded the Ring of Resurrection magazine. In November 1921 – at the behest of Benedict XV – she established the Society of Friends of the Catholic University.

Alongside Agostino Gemelli, Ludovico Necchi, Francesco Olgiati and Ernesto Lobardo, she established the Istituto Giuseppe Toniolo di Studi Superiori and it was recognized by the Italian Minister of Education, Benedetto Croce, on 24 June 1920. Benedict XV approved it around the same time which allowed for it to be inaugurated around the same time. In 1936 she established a girls' college named the Marianum College.

Pope Pius XII appointed her in 1946 as the Deputy President of Catholic Action and she held that title until 1949. In 1948 she - alongside Gemelli - renamed their religious congregation with the name of the Secular Institute of the Missionaries of the Kingship of Christ in order to spread the Franciscan charism. That same year, she favored the Christian Democrats in the general election in order to prevent the victory of the Italian Communist Party.

In 1949 she began to suffer the effects of a progressive and an incurable disease and on 8 January 1952 suffered paralysis in her right hand. On 15 August 1952 she was visited by Gemelli, only to die mere hours later. She was buried on the following 17 August in Marzio and her remains were transferred to Milan on 8 March 1953. Upon his death in 1959, Gemelli was buried alongside her.

== Beatification ==
The diocesan process commenced under Pope John XXIII on 8 March 1960 and the introduction of the cause in Milan granted her the title Servant of God; the process concluded in mid-1970 and was validated in Rome on 3 April 1992, several decades after the diocesan process concluded. The Congregation for the Causes of Saints received the positio from the postulator in order to evaluate Barelli's life of heroic virtue and received it in 1993. Barelli was proclaimed to be venerable on 1 June 2007 after Pope Benedict XVI recognized that Barelli had practised heroic virtue.

The miracle required for her beatification was investigated and was validated in 2006. The medical board in Rome met on 12 November 2009 and the board requested further material pertaining to a miracle in 2015. The medical board later issued their approval before the theologians must meet to likewise approve it. The case was delivered to Pope Francis who provided his approval in 2021; this enabled for her beatification to take place on 30 April 2022 in Milan. The postulator assigned to the cause is Silvia Mónica Correale.
