= Giuseppe Toniolo =

Italian Roman Catholic economist, sociologist, pioneer of Christian democracy

Blessed Giuseppe Toniolo
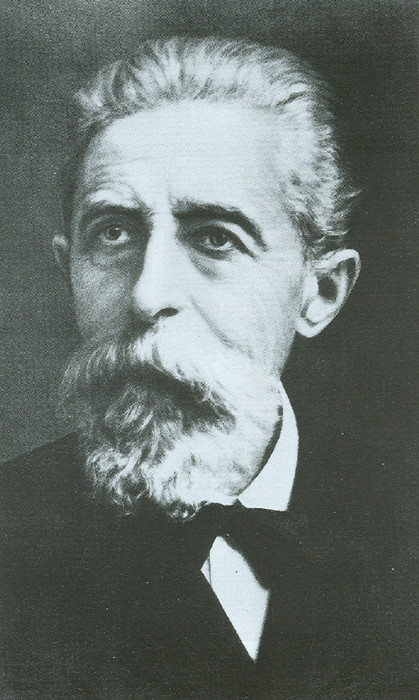
- Born: 7 March 1845; Treviso, Kingdom of Lombardy–Venetia
- Died: 7 October 1918 (aged 73); Pisa, Kingdom of Italy
- Venerated in: Roman Catholic Church
- Beatified: 29 April 2012, Basilica of Saint Paul Outside the Walls by Cardinal Salvatore De Giorgi
- Feast: 7 October

Giuseppe Toniolo (7 March 1845 – 7 October 1918) was an Italian Catholic economist, sociologist, and pioneer of Christian democracy. A leading political and social economist, Toniolo condemned both socialism and laissez-faire capitalism, advocating instead for an economic system in which social, judicial, and economic forces cooperate proportionately for the common good. Toniolo was an early Catholic advocate of labour unions and social reform. Describing the economy as an "integral part of the operative design of God," his work was inspired by Catholic social teaching. Toniolo was beatified on 29 April 2012 by Pope Benedict XVI in Rome.

== Life ==
=== Education and marriage ===
Giuseppe Toniolo was born in Treviso on 7 March 1845 as the first of four children to Antonio Toniolo and Isabella Alessandrini; he lived in the Sant'Andrea parish area. His maternal uncle was Alessandro.

During his childhood the Toniolos moved several times since his father (an engineer) took different jobs at various places in the Veneto region. Toniolo attended high school at Saint Catherine's school in Venice before entering the college in Padua. It was there that he studied jurisprudence and took courses that Fedele Lampertico and Angelo Messedaglia led before graduating on 21 June 1867. But his father's sudden death caused an interruption of his studies though he later resumed his education prior to his graduation.

Toniolo married Maria Schiratti in the morning on 4 September 1878 (the couple met after Maria's brothers Gaetano and Renato facilitated the union); the couple had seven children together with three who died in their childhoods.

=== Professorship ===
Rather than pursue a legal career he taught economics for more than four decades and was named as an assistant to the chair in juridical-political studies at his alma mater in 1868 before teaching in Venice at the Istituto Tecnico di Venezia from 1874 to 1878. This was interrupted once due to a short stint back in Padua. In 1878 he became a professor at the Modena and Reggio Emilia college. Toniolo was named as a professor at the Pisa college in 1883 and held the chair of political economics there until his death in 1918.

Toniolo defended the importance of religious values in politics and economics despite some Christians shunning politics due to the masonic and anti-clerical elements who had helped for Italian unification in 1860. Toniolo developed theories of social teaching which formed a middle path between the laissez-faire economics (the Adam Smith proposal; one that Camillo Benso advocated as did Vilfredo Pareto) and the state-centered socialism that followers of Karl Marx proposed and advocated.

In 1889 he founded the Catholic Union for Social Studies and later founded the International Review of Social Sciences in 1893. The Germanic historical economic thought - that of Gustav von Schmoller and later Joseph Schumpeter - served as influences on Italian intellectuals of the time. Toniolo advocated worker protection and in 1889 founded a union to fight for worker rights and also worked to limit the work week while striving to protect women and children. Toniolo believed in institutions which could mediate between individuals and the state from the household to unions and professional associations. He led the Christian social action movement after 1900 which became somewhat similar to social activism in the United States. Toniolo's ideas in particular influenced Popes Leo XIII (including Rerum novarum) and Pius X. He said that economics "is an integral part of the operative design of God" which is considered to be an "obligation of justice" that should serve as an essential service to all people rather than a select few. Toniolo also knew Monsignor Georg Ratzinger - the granduncle of Pope Benedict XVI.

In September 1918 he urged Agostino Gemelli to establish a college in Milan after the war ended and Gemelli founded the "Università Cattolica del Sacro Cuore" in 1921 with it growing to become one of the world's largest universities with branches in Milan (the main one) as well as in Piacenza and Brescia with its medical school located in Rome (the Gemelli Institute). Toniolo was also a friend to Bartolo Longo and the likes of Cardinal Andrea Carlo Ferrari and Bishop Giacomo Radini-Tedeschi lauded his thought and activism.

=== Death and views of contemporaries ===
Toniolo died on 7 October 1918 and his remains lie buried in the Santa Maria Assunta church at Pieve di Soligo. In a conference that concerned the beatified Toniolo in 2012 came remarks in a sent message from Cardinal Tarcisio Bertone who cited him as a model for activism. Most of his works have not been translated into English as of 2013. His remains were exhumed on 20 September 2011 for canonical inspection and later reinterred that 7 October in the same tomb though in a different marble sarcophagus. The Bishop of Vittorio Veneto Corrado Pizziolo and its bishop emeritus Alfredo Magarotto were present alongside the postulator Sorrentino.

In 1961 the then-Bishop of Vittorio Veneto Albino Luciani - the future Pope John Paul I - gave a talk noting Toniolo's contribution to social teaching and activism. Luciani referred to Toniolo as a "tireless propagator of the ideas of Rerum Novarum".

== Beatification ==
Lobbies from the F.U.C.I. for the recognition of his holiness began in 1933 leading to the initiation of the beatification process that would see Toniolo raised to the honors of the altar. The informative phase of investigation began in Pisa in 1934 and later concluded in 1941 with an apostolic process later being held also in Pisa from 1951 until 1954. Theologians assessed Toniolo's writings to assess if there was an adherence to doctrine and approved them of possessing no doctrinal errors in a decree issued on 1 June 1947. The formal introduction to the cause came under Pope Pius XII on 7 January 1951 in which Toniolo became titled as a Servant of God. The Congregation for Rites later validated the informative and apostolic processes on 8 July 1955.

The Congregation for the Causes of Saints and their consultants met and approved the cause on 16 February 1971 with the cardinal and bishop members of the C.C.S. alone later granting additional approval a month later on 29 March. Pope Paul VI named Toniolo as Venerable on 14 June 1971 after confirming that the late economist had lived a model life of heroic virtue.

Toniolo's beatification depended upon a single miracle receiving papal approval. Such a miracle needed to be healing that science and medicine could fail to explain. One such case was discovered in Vittorio Veneto and the process to assess this miracle took place there from 24 September 2006 until its closure a month later on 19 October. The investigation moved to Rome where the C.C.S. validated this process on 30 November 2007 before medical experts confirmed the miraculous nature of the healing on 28 February 2008. Theologians confirmed on 29 April 2009 that the miracle came due to the invocation of Toniolo's intercession with the C.C.S. members agreeing with both panels at their meeting on 11 January 2011. Pope Benedict XVI confirmed the findings on 14 January 2011 and granted his pontifical approval for Toniolo's beatification. Giovanni Angelo Becciu informed the then-postulator Sorrentino on 11 November 2011 about the date confirmed for the beatification.

The beatification was celebrated on 29 April 2012 in the Basilica di San Paolo fuori le Mura with Cardinal Salvatore De Giorgi presiding over the celebration on the pope's behalf. The Archbishop of Pisa attended the beatification as did over 40 bishops and archbishops and 5000 people. Cardinal Dionigi Tettamanzi also attended alongside fellow cardinals Angelo Bagnasco and Giuseppe Betori as well as Paolo Sardi. In his Regina Caeli address on the same day Benedict XVI said of Toniolo: "His message is very up to date, especially in these times: Bl. Toniolo points out the way of the primacy of the human person and of solidarity."

The former postulator for this cause was the Bishop Domenico Sorrentino and is now Dr. Silvia Mónica Correale.

=== Miracle ===
The miracle that allowed for Toniolo's beatification was the healing of Francesco Bortolini who was healed from serious injuries after suffering from a fall in 2006 and invoking Toniolo's intercession.

== See also ==
- Istituto Giuseppe Toniolo di Studi Superiori
