= Graduate School of Agri-Food Management and Economics =

- Other names: SMEA
- Type: Private
- Established: 1984
- Affiliations: Università Cattolica del Sacro Cuore
- Dean: Daniele Rama
- Location: Cremona, Lombardy, Italy
- Campus: Urban
- Website: smea.unicatt.it

The Graduate School of Agri-Food Management and Economics (Italian: Alta Scuola in Economia Agro-alimentare), or SMEA, is a specializing school of Università Cattolica del Sacro Cuore.

== History ==
SMEA was born in Cremona in 1984 as the School of Specialization and Master in Economics of Agro-Food System initiative of the Faculty of Agricultural Economics and Catholic. Since 1997, the SMEA is part of ASFOR. Since 2005 is part of the system of Università Cattolica's Postgraduate Schools.

== Courses ==
- Management of the Agricultural and Food System
- Agribusiness
- Master of Science in Agricultural and Food Economics
- Agricultural and food market institutions
- Agricultural and food marketing
- Economics of agricultural and food markets
- Business planning and control
