= Lethal Weapon (disambiguation) =

Lethal Weapon is a 1987 American buddy cop film.

Lethal Weapon or Lethal Weapons may also refer to:

== Arts and entertainment ==
=== Film ===
- Lethal Weapon (franchise), an American buddy cop film franchise
  - Lethal Weapon 2, a 1989 American buddy cop film
  - Lethal Weapon 3, a 1992 American buddy cop film
  - Lethal Weapon 4, a 1998 American buddy cop film

=== Television ===
==== Episodes ====
- "Chuck Versus the Lethal Weapon", Chuck season 2, episode 16 (2009)
- "Lethal Weapon", 24 Hours in Police Custody series 4, episode 7 (2016)
- "Lethal Weapon", High Hopes series 2, episode 5 (2003)
- "Lethal Weapon", Lois & Clark: The New Adventures of Superman season 4, episode 12 (1997)
- "Lethal Weapon", Perfect Strangers season 8, episode 3 (1993)
- "Lethal Weapon", The Expert season 2, episode 18 (1969)
- "Lethal Weapons", Family Guy season 3, episode 7 (2001)
- "Lethal Weapons", The Exes season 2, episode 5 (2012)
- "Lethal Weapons", The Law and Mr. Jones episode 18 (1961)
- "Lethal Weapons", Time Trax season 2, episode 7 (1994)

==== Series ====
- Lethal Weapon (TV series), an American buddy cop television series based on the film franchise

=== Games ===
- Lethal Weapon (video game), a 1992 video game based on the third film
- Lethal Weapon 3 (pinball), a 1992 pinball machine based on the film

=== Music ===
- Lethal Weapon (soundtrack), a soundtrack album for the 1987 film
- "Lethal Weapon" (song), a 1989 song by Ice-T
- The Lethal Weapons, a Japanese rock and synthpop duo

=== Other uses in arts and entertainment ===
- Lethal Weapon (professional wrestling), a Japanese professional wrestling stable
- Lethal Weapon – The Ride, a roller coaster in Queensland, Australia themed after the film franchise

== Weapons ==
- Deadly weapon, an item that can inflict mortal or great bodily harm
- Lethal autonomous weapon, a type of autonomous military robot

== See also ==
- Deadly Weapon (disambiguation)
- Lethal Weapons of Love and Passion, a Hong Kong wuxia television series
