= Roman Catholic Diocese of Guastalla =

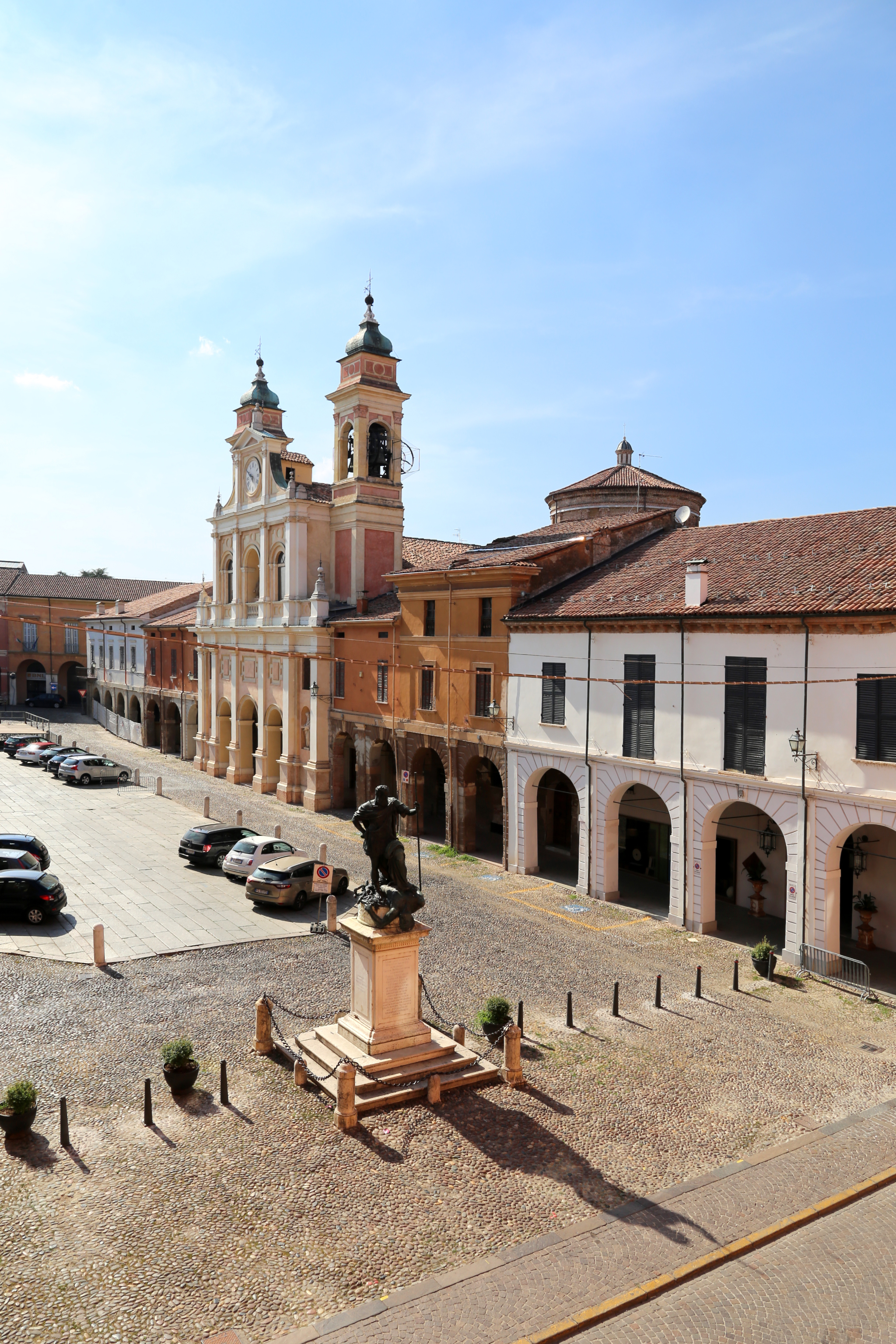
Cathedral of S. Peter

The Diocese of Guastalla (Dioecesis Guastallensis) was a Catholic suffragan bishopric in the province of Reggio Emilia, Italy, from 1828 to 1986. It began as a small chapel, ordered by a Holy Roman Emperor in 865; it was promoted into being a parish; it then became a territorial abbey; and finally, after the Napoleonic occupation of Italy, it was made a diocese at the request of his second wife. The diocese followed the Roman rite.

== History ==
Guastalla began as a chapel, built on order of the Emperor Louis II dated 2 November 865, on territory given to his wife Engelberga. Ecclesiastically, the chapel was part of the diocese of Reggio; the bishop subinfeudated the chapel into the hands of Boniface, Count of Toscana.

=== The parish ===
The chapel of S. Peter was promoted into being a parish church (plebes, piave) c. 996–999 by Pope Gregory V. In 1101 Countess Matilda of Tuscany bestowed liberty upon the church of Guastalla.

On 21 October 1106, Pope Paschal II held a council in Guastalla of bishops from France, Germany and Italy. He declared that, since the See of Ravenna had so frequently opposed the leadership of the Church of Rome, the dioceses of Parma, Reggio, Modena, and Bologna should never thereafter be subject to Ravenna as their metropolitan.

By 1145 the Church of S. Peter at Guastalla was presided over by an Archpriest, as Pope Eugene III noted in his bull which took the Church of Guastalla under the protection of the Holy See. He also granted them the right to seek holy oils, consecrations and ordinations from whichever Catholic bishop they wished. The archive of the Archpriest of the Pieve of Guastalla was destroyed in 1557 as a casualty of war.

Guastalla formed part of the diocese of Reggio until 1471, when the Collegiate Church of S. Peter of Guastalla was declared to be nullius dioecesis (of no diocese) and was territorially detached from the jurisdiction of the bishop of Reggio Emilia.

=== The territorial abbey ===
On 5 November 1585 Pope Sixtus V promoted the parish to the status of a secular territorial abbey nullius dioecesis (belonging to no diocese), as the abbey of San Pietro Apostolo di Guastalla.

==== The territorial Abbots ====
1. Bernardino Baldi d'Urbino (1585–1607)
2. Pietro Baruffoni (1607–1613)
3. Marcello Celio Arcelli of Piacenza(1613–1615)
4. Troilo Accorsini d'Acquapendente (1616–1623)
5. Vincenzio Loiani of Bologna (1623–1624)
6. Giambattista Gherardini (1624–1651)
7. Giacopo Quinziani of Reggio (1652–1686)
8. Cesare Spilimbergo (1686 1710)
9. Guidobono Mazzucchini (1711–1755)
10. Francesco Tirelli of Guastalla (1755–1792)
11. Francesco Scutellari (1792–1826)
12. Giovanni Neuschel (1826–1828)

The eleventh Abbot Ordinary of Guastalla, Francesco Maria Scutellari of Parma, was also titular bishop of Joppa (Palestine). He ruled Guastalla from 1792 until his death in 1826. His death brought about a major change in the status of the Pieve. He was succeeded by the chaplain of Marie Louise, Duchess of Parma, Giovanni Neuschel, titular bishop of Alessandria Troas (Ilio), from 1826 to 1828.

By a decree of Pope Pius VII in an apostolic letter of 1 December 1821, as part of a general reorganization of the hierarchy of Italy following the expulsion of the French, the territory of the Abbey of Guastalla became subject to the Diocese of Parma. It had been subject to the Diocese of Milan, under the French organization of the Cisalpine Republic (1797–1802) and the Napoleonic Kingdom of Italy (1805–1814).

=== The diocese ===
In his papal bull De commisso of 13 September 1828, Pope Leo XII, at the request of Marie Louise, Duchess of Parma, created the bishopric of Guastalla. He decreed that the diocese be directly subject to the Holy See (Papacy) unless and until the pope decided otherwise. He suppressed the abbatial college chapter, and ordered the creation of a new cathedral Chapter. The Chapter was to consist of five dignities (the Archpriest, the Archdeacon, the Provost, the Dean, and the Primicerius), sixteen Canons, and seven mansionarii. The two senior Canons were to be the Theologus and the Penitentiarius, in accordance with the decrees of the Council of Trent.

In 1920, the diocese of Guastalla had 26 parishes, 58 other churches and chapels, 76 diocesan priests, and 25 students in the seminary. In 1980, it had 30 parishes, 47 diocesan priests, and 3 priests belonging to Religious Orders.

After a vacancy of nearly thirty months, following the death of Bishop Angelo Zambarbieri, Pope Paul VI appointed Bishop Gilberto Baroni, who was already bishop of Reggio Emilia, to also be bishop of Guastalla. Bishop Baroni had been acting as Apostolic Administrator of the diocese of Guastalla during the Sede vacante. On 30 September 1986, the diocese was suppressed by Pope John Paul II, and its territory and title merged into the Diocese of Reggio Emilia, with the new name of Reggio Emilia–Guastalla. Guastalla became Vicariate IV of the diocese of Reggio Emilia-Guastalla.

== Bishops ==
- Giovanni Tommaso Neuschel (1828–1836)
- Pietro Giovanni Zanardi (1836–1854)
- Pietro Rota (1855–1871)
- Francesco Benassi (1871–retired 1884)
- Prospero Curti (1884–1890)
- Andrea Carlo Ferrari (1890–1891)
- Pietro Respighi (1891–1896)
- Enrico Grazioli (1896–1897)
- Andrea Sarti (1897–1909)
- Agostino Cattaneo (1910–1923)
- Giordano Corsini (1923–1932)
- Giacomo Zaffrani (1932–1960)
- Angelo Zambarbieri (1960–1970)

Sede vacante (1970–1973)

- Gilberto Baroni (1973–1986)

== Bibliography ==
- Affò, Ireneo (1783). Vita di Bernardino Baldi da Urbino primo abate di Guastalla (in Italian). Parma: Filippo Carmignani.
- Affò, Ireneo (1785). Istoria della cittá e ducato di Guastalla (in Italian). Vol. Tomo primo. Guastalla: Salvatore Costa e compagno.
- Affò, Ireneo (1786). Istoria della cittá e ducato di Guastalla (in Italian). Vol. Tomo secondo. Guastalla: Salvatore Costa e compagno.
- Affò, Ireneo (1787). Istoria della cittá e ducato di Guastalla (in Italian). Vol. Tomo terzo. Guastalla: Salvatore Costa e compagno.
- Affò, Ireneo (1787). Istoria della cittá e ducato di Guastalla (in Italian). Vol. Tomo quarto (4). Guastalla: Salvatore Costa e compagno.
- Cappelletti, Giuseppe (1859). Le chiese d'Italia: dalla loro origine sino ai nostri giorni (in Italian). Vol. Tomo decimoquinto (15). Venezia: G. Antonelli. pp. 425–440.
- Gams, Pius Bonifatius (1873). Series episcoporum Ecclesiae catholicae: quotquot innotuerunt a beato Petro apostolo. Ratisbon: Typis et Sumptibus Georgii Josephi Manz. (in Latin)
- Palese, Salvatore; Emanuele Boaga; Francesco De Luca; Lorella Ingrosso (editors). Guida degli Archivi Capitolari d’italia, II. Roma: Ministero per i beni e le attività culturali, Direzione Generale per gli archivi 2003 (Pubblicazioni degli Archivi Di Stato. Strumenti ClVIII), pp. 71–74. (in Italian)
- Ritzler, Remigius; Sefrin, Pirminus (1968). Hierarchia Catholica medii et recentioris aevi (in Latin). Vol. VII (1800–1846). Monasterii: Libr. Regensburgiana.
- Remigius Ritzler; Pirminus Sefrin (1978). Hierarchia catholica Medii et recentioris aevi (in Latin). Vol. VIII (1846–1903). Il Messaggero di S. Antonio.
- Pięta, Zenon (2002). Hierarchia catholica medii et recentioris aevi (in Latin). Vol. IX. Padua: Messagero di San Antonio. ISBN 978-88-250-1000-8.

=== External links ===
- GCatholic with incumbent bio links
