= Marianum College =

The Marianum College (Italian: Collegio Marianum) is the oldest girls' college at the Università Cattolica del Sacro Cuore in Milan.

== History ==
The college is established in 1936 by Armida Barelli. Initially the location of this dorm was detected in some accommodation on a Necchi 2. Later the college was moved to the new building in Via Necchi 1. In 1943, during the Second World War, the college was closed because of the bombings. The college was reopened in 1945 and the director was Mea Tabanelli. In 1992, two years after closing for renovations, the residence was moved to its present location on Via San Vittore 18.
