= Femme Fatale: Bae Jeong-ja =

- Theatrical poster
- Hangul: 요화 배정자
- RR: Yohwa Bae Jeongja
- MR: Yohwa Pae Chŏngja
- Directed by: Jeong In-yeob
- Written by: Han Yoo-lim; Yu Yeol
- Produced by: Kim Tai-soo
- Starring: Yeon Jeong-hie; Nam Kung-won; Jung Yoon-Min
- Cinematography: Lee Seok-ik
- Music by: Park Ji-woong
- Distributed by: Tae Chang Films Co., Ltd
- Release date: June 14, 1973
- Running time: 119 minutes
- Country: South Korea
- Language: Korean

Femme Fatale: Bae Jeong-ja (Korean: 요화 배정자) is a 1973 South Korean film is based on the life of Bae Jeong-ja (1870–1950), a young Korean orphan adopted by Itō Hirobumi and raised as his daughter. However, she betrays him and her Japanese upbringing after falling in love with a freedom fighter named Hong-Jun.

== Cast ==
- Yoon Jeong-hee as Bae Jeong-ja
- Shin Seong-il as Itō Hirobumi
- Namkoong Won as Hong-jun

== See also ==
- Korea under Japanese rule
