= Graduate School of Media Communications and Performing Arts =

- Alta Scuola in Media, Comunicazione e Spettacolo
- Other names: ALMED
- Type: Private
- Established: 2002
- Affiliations: Università Cattolica del Sacro Cuore
- Dean: Ruggero Eugeni
- Location: Milan, Lombardy, Italy
- Campus: Urban
- Website: almed.unicatt.it

The Graduate School of Media Communication and Performing Arts (Italian: Alta Scuola in Media Comunicazione e Spettacolo, or ALMED) is an Italian educational institution of Università Cattolica del Sacro Cuore.

== History ==
Mario Apollonio was the founder of the School of Journalism and Audiovisual Media in Bergamo in 1961. Later, the school moved to Milan where it focused on teaching and research at the Università Cattolica del Sacro Cuore. It was renamed as the School of Specialization in Communications and offers degrees in studies of Journalism, Advertising and Entertainment. It was again renamed to the School of Specialization in Analysis and Communication Management in 1998. In 2002, it joined the system of the Postgraduate School's Cattolica with its current name.

== Courses ==
The school offers master's degrees in:

- Musical communication
- Communication and marketing of film
- Communications, digital marketing and interactive advertising
- Master of Cultural Events (MEC): Design and planning of cultural events, art, cinema, entertainment
- Art Events: Planning of art, culture and design for cities, businesses and territories (organized in collaboration with the Polytechnic of Milan)
- The enterprise culture: management, finance, communication culture of the area
- Audiovisual production for film and digital media
- FareTV: management, development, communication
- Media relations and corporate communications

== Projects ==
Magzine is the online newspaper written by the School of Journalism since 2002. Forty journalists work in the newsroom.
