= Vita e pensiero =

Vita e pensiero is a magazine that was established in 1914. It was proposed to be a mediator between the Catholic faith and the world and is still published as a magazine of the Università Cattolica del Sacro Cuore.

== History ==
The Franciscan Agostino Gemelli, Ludovico Necchi, and Francesco Olgiati established the magazine in 1914 for Catholics in order to discuss the political, economic, and social issues of the time.
