= Fatalis =

Fatalis, Latin for "deadly", may refer to:

- Smilodon fatalis ("the deadly Smilodon"), a saber-toothed cat

in Popular Culture

- Arc Fatalis, a black metal band from the United States

in Video Games

- Fatalis is one of the dragons that appear in the Monster Hunter video game franchise.
- Liberi Fatali is the Latin choral opening to the computer role-playing game Final Fantasy VIII
- Arx Fatalis, an RPG for the Xbox and PC, released in 2002 by Arkane Studios
