= Agostino Gemelli =

Italian Franciscan friar, physician and psychologist

The Reverend Agostino Gemelli, O.F.M.
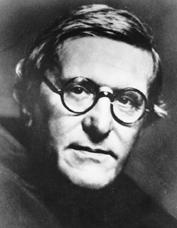
- Born: Edoardo Gemelli; 18 January 1878; Milan, Kingdom of Italy
- Died: 15 July 1959 (aged 81); Milan, Italy
- Known for: Founding the Catholic University of Milan; Neurophysiological research
- Scientific career
- Fields: Medicine, Neuropsychology and Physiology
- Workplaces: Catholic University of Milan

Agostino Gemelli, O.F.M., (18 January 1878 – 15 July 1959) was an Italian Franciscan friar, physician and psychologist, who was also the founder and first rector of the Università Cattolica del Sacro Cuore (Catholic University of the Sacred Heart) of Milan.

Gemelli's Institute of Psychology was the most prominent institution of its kind in Italy. In 1959 he founded a teaching hospital for the Medical School of the university, located in Rome, the Agostino Gemelli University Polyclinic, which is now named after him. He has become criticized in historical analyses for some racist statements leading up to the Second World War and his intense support for Benito Mussolini. He focused some of his research on the psychology of the workplace.

== Life ==
=== Early life ===
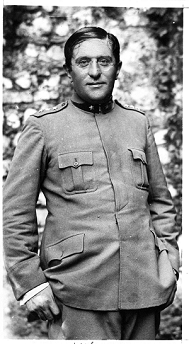
At San Giorgio in 1917 were also visiting the bishop of Castrense Monsignor Angelo Bartolomasi and father Gemelli, then Major physician director of the office of Psychiatry of Milan, and valuable collaborator of the Bishop of military chaplains in priestly rallies

He was born Edoardo Gemelli in 1878 to an irreligious prosperous bourgeois Milanese family, who were members of the Masonic movement. In his youth, his commitment to social causes led him to become a member of the Italian Socialist Party. He went to Ghislieri College for his education. After his training as a physician, he carried out neurophysiological and psychological experiments, some with the famed physiologist Camillo Golgi.

Gemelli, who had been an agnostic from his upbringing, had a religious conversion from his experience of military service in a hospital, that brought him into contact with a chaplain there who impressed him deeply. This led him to join the Order of Friars Minor in 1903, at which time he took the name Agostino. He was professed in the Order on 23 December 1904, and ordained on 14 March 1908. As members of religious orders were barred by the Catholic Church from practising medicine then, he continued his medical research, moving into the field of neuropsychology, where he was dissatisfied with many of the theories regarding the central nervous system held at the time.

=== Religious founder ===
At the same time, Gemelli undertook many spiritual activities, helping to found the secular institute of the Missionaries of the Kingship of Christ, established by Armida Barelli, a Christian social activist. He first led her to join the Third Order of St. Francis, and in 1919, seeking a greater commitment, under his guidance, Barelli joined with other Franciscan tertiaries to form this group. In 1928, he guided the establishment of a men's branch of the institute, led by Giorgio La Pira who was a member of the Italian Senate.

=== Università Cattolica del Sacro Cuore ===
Gemelli founded the Catholic University in 1921, and soon gained the patronage of Pope Benedict XV. It was founded as an instrument of forming a new leadership class for a future Catholic state. This religiously motivated political goal was intended to counteract the anti-clerical state established by the unifiers of modern Italy in 1860.

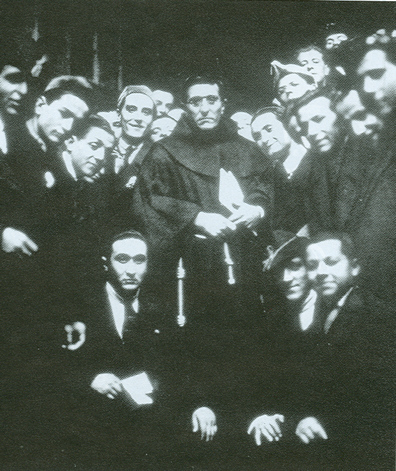
Agostino Gemelli surrounded by some students

In 1929 the Holy See signed a Concordat with the government of Benito Mussolini, which made the Catholic Church the state religion of Italy. At that point, the university became a laboratory for Catholic social policies through which the church might bring the Fascist state in line with canon law and papal teachings. Gemelli taught as a professor of Applied Psychology at the university.

Despite Gemelli's accommodations to the state, he maintained relative autonomy for his university. This allowed the left wing of the Christian Democratic Party to organize and develop at the Università Cattolica during Mussolini's peak years.

=== Antisemitism ===
Gemelli is considered as a supporter of Mussolinian state antisemitism:

- He wrote a controversial and notoriously vicious article about antisemitism against the Jewish intellectual and Italian socialist philosopher Felice Momigliano in 1924 (the article was published unsigned onVita e pensiero and recognized later on).
- He moved away from socialism and gradually favoured and supported the Fascist regime's racial laws in 1938 began by Mussolini and influenced by Adolf Hitler, which were aimed primarily at Jews.

=== Death ===
Gemelli died in Milan on 15 July 1959.

== Academic legacy ==
Gemelli is also considered one of the 20th century's most prominent Franciscans. He worked to reconcile Christian faith and modern culture, though questions have arisen about his political legacy in recent times.

Despite his many administrative duties as University Rector (which he performed until his death), Gemelli's endeavours involved both scientific and philosophical studies. At the request of Pope Pius XI, he also served as the first President of the Pontifical Academy of Sciences (1937). In addition, he wrote extensively on the contemporary meaning of Franciscan spirituality and was a pioneer in actively engaging the laity in the mission of the church.

=== Publications ===
- Rivista di filosofia neoscolastica (1908)
- La lotta contro Lourdes (1911), a book in which he took on the medical establishment of Milan regarding the scientific reliability of cures claimed at the Shrine of Our Lady of Lourdes in France, noted for the great number of healings taking place there
- Vita e Pensiero (1914)
- Biologie (1939)
- La psicotecnica applicata alle industrie (1944)
- La psicologia dell'orientamento professionale (1945)
- Psicologia dell'età evolutiva, with Agatha Sidlauskas (1946)
- La personalità del delinquente (1946)
- Introduzione alla psicologia, with Giorgio Zunini (1947)
- La criminologia e il diritto penale (1951)
- Archivi della Psicología, Neurología e Psichiatría
- Associazione Cattolica Internazionale degli Studi Medicali-Psicologici

== Padre Pio controversy ==
Even though Agostino Gemelli was a harsh critic of Padre Pio, calling him "an ignorant and self-mutilating psychopath who exploited people's credulity" with his stigmata, Gemelli only met Padre Pio, once in April 18, 1920. It was a brief meeting held in the company of at least 6 witnesses. Padre Pio refused to show Gemelli his stigmata because Gemelli had come without the Vatican's approval. Gemelli and Padre Pio only exchanged a handful of words. This was to be Gemelli's one and only contact with the future saint. Gemelli parted company with the Friary in an outrage. Gemelli reportedly spread misinformation about Padre Pio and this misinformation is believed to have been instrumental in moving the Vatican to take various measures in censuring Padre Pio, including a prohibition on celebrating Mass in public.

Academic offices
| Preceded by New position | Rector of Università Cattolica del Sacro Cuore; 7 December 1921 - 1959 | Succeeded by Francesco Vito |
