= 2008 Italian general election in Lombardy =

- April 13, 2008

All 98 seats in the Italian Chamber of Deputies 47 Lombard seats in the Italian Senate
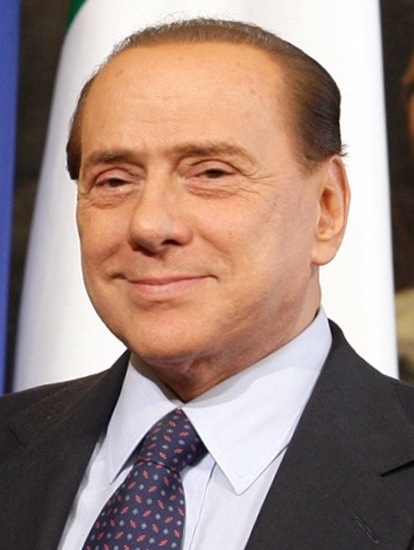

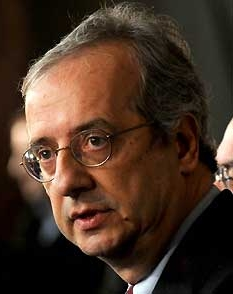
	Majority party	Minority party
Leader	Silvio Berlusconi	Walter Veltroni
Party	People of Freedom	Democratic Party
Alliance	Silvio Berlusconi	Walter Veltroni
Last election	50 & 27 seats 49.0%, total 57.0%	48 & 20 seats 28.7%, total 43.1%
Seats won	62 (H); 30 (S)	32 (H); 17 (S)
Seat change	+15	-19
Popular vote	3,387,180	1,972,981
Percentage	55.1%	32.1%
Swing	+6.1%	+3.4%

The 2008 Italian general election took place on 13–14 April 2008.

The election was won in Lombardy by the centre-right coalition between The People of Freedom and Lega Nord, as it happened at the national level. The People of Freedom was the largest party in the election with 33.5%, ahead of the Democratic Party (28.1%) and Lega Nord (21.6%).

== Results ==
=== Chamber of Deputies ===
Coalition leaders	votes	votes (%)	seats	Party	votes	votes (%)	seats
Silvio Berlusconi	3,387,180	55.1	62	The People of Freedom	2,059,231	33.5	37
Silvio Berlusconi	3,387,180	55.1	62	Lega Nord	1,327,949	21.6	25
Walter Veltroni	1,972,981	32.1	32	Democratic Party	1,727,006	28.1	28
Walter Veltroni	1,972,981	32.1	32	Italy of Values	245,975	4.0	4
Pier Ferdinando Casini	261,293	4.3	5	Union of the Centre	261,293	4.3	5
Fausto Bertinotti	180,621	2.9	-	The Left – The Rainbow	180,621	2.9	-
Daniela Santanchè	130,324	2.1	-	The Right	130,324	2.1	-
Enrico Boselli	37,349	0.6	-	Socialist Party	37,349	0.6	-
Marco Ferrando	33,646	0.5	-	Workers' Communist Party	33,646	0.5	-
Giuliano Ferrara	28,439	0.5	-	Abortion? No, thanks	28,439	0.5	-
Others	110,214	1.8	-	Others	110,214	1.8	-
Total coalitions	6,142,028	100.0	98	Total parties	6,142,028	100.0	98

Source: Ministry of the Interior

Popular vote (Parties)
The People of Freedom	33.5%
Democratic	28.1%
Lega Nord	21.6%
UDC	4.3%
Italy of Values	4.0%
The Left – The Rainbow	2.9%
The Right	2.1%
Others	4.6%

Popular vote (Coalitions)
Berlusconi coalition	55.1%
Veltroni coalition	32.1%
Others	13.9%

=== Senate ===
Coalition leader	votes	votes (%)	seats	Party	votes	votes (%)	swing	seats	change
Silvio Berlusconi	3,139,694	55.1	30	The People of Freedom	1,959,681	34.4	-3.6	19	0
Silvio Berlusconi	3,139,694	55.1	30	Lega Nord	1,180,013	20.7	+9.6	11	+6
Walter Veltroni	1,823,835	32.0	17	Democratic Party	1,607,928	28.2	+5.8	15	+2
Walter Veltroni	1,823,835	32.0	17	Italy of Values	215,907	3.8	+1.2	2	+2
Pier Ferdinando Casini	240,481	4.2	-	Union of the Centre	240,481	4.2	-1.7	-	-3
Fausto Bertinotti	183,061	3.2	-	The Left – The Rainbow	183,061	3.2	-8.6	-	-7
Daniela Santanchè	93,077	1.6	-	The Right – Tricolour Flame	93,077	1.6	+0.5	-	-
Eva Rossi	45,622	0.8	-	Lega per l'Autonomia – Alleanza Lombarda	45,622	0.8	-0.8	-	-
Enrico Boselli	30,745	0.5	-	Socialist Party	30,745	0.5	-1.7	-	-
Marco Ferrando	27,141	0.5	-	Workers' Communist Party	27,141	0.5	+0.5	-	-
Renzo Rabellino	25,866	0.5	-	List of Talking Crickets	25,866	0.5	+0.5	-	-
Others	86,632	1.5	-	Others	86,632	1.5	-1.7	-	-
Total coalitions	5,696,154	100.0	47	Total parties	5,696,154	100.0	=	47	=

Source: Ministry of the Interior

== MPs elected in Lombardy ==
=== Chamber of Deputies ===
==== Lombardy 1 (Milano-Monza) ====
===== The People of Freedom =====
- Ignazio La Russa
- Stefania Craxi
- Gianfranco Rotondi
- Andrea Ronchi
- Mario Valducci
- Paolo Romani
- Maurizio Lupi
- Luigi Casero
- Francesco Colucci
- Gaetano Pecorella
- Paola Frassinetti
- Valentina Aprea
- Mariella Bocciardo
- Elena Centemero
- Riccardo De Corato
- Giorgio Stracquadanio

===== Democratic Party =====
- Matteo Colaninno
- Linda Lanzillotta
- Barbara Pollastrini
- Emilio Quartiani
- Enrico Farinone
- Furio Colombo
- Emilia De Biasi
- Emanuele Fiano
- Vinicio Peluffo
- Alessia Mosca
- Roberto Zaccaria
- Lino Duilio
- Pierluigi Mantini

===== Lega Nord =====
- Umberto Bossi
- Giancarlo Giorgetti
- Ettore Pirovano (replaced by Fabio Meroni on 21 December 2011)
- Paolo Grimoldi
- Matteo Salvini (replaced by Marco Desiderati on 13 July 2009)
- Giacomo Chiappori
- Claudio D'Amico
- Laura Molteni

===== Italy of Values =====
- Gabriele Cimadoro
- Anita Di Giuseppe

===== Union of the Centre =====
- Bruno Tabacci

==== Lombardy 2 (Bergamo-Brescia-Como-Sondrio-Varese-Lecco) ====
===== The People of Freedom =====
- Giulio Tremonti
- Mariastella Gelmini
- Raffaello Vignali
- Mirko Tremaglia (replaced by Luigi Fabbri on 10 January 2012)
- Gregorio Fontana
- Stefano Saglia
- Antonio Palmieri
- Adriano Paroli (replaced by Marco Airaghi on 1 February 2012)
- Laura Ravetto
- Viviana Beccalossi
- Giuseppe Romele
- Giorgio Jannone
- Massimo Maria Berruti
- Antonio Angelucci
- Renato Farina

===== Lega Nord =====
- Roberto Maroni
- Giacomo Stucchi
- Davide Caparini
- Marco Reguzzoni
- Daniele Molgora
- Nicola Molteni
- Marco Rondini
- Carolina Lussana
- Silvana Comaroli
- Jonny Crosio
- Pierguido Vanalli
- Erica Rivolta
- Raffaele Volpi
- Nunziante Consiglio

===== Democratic Party =====
- Enrico Letta
- Paolo Corsini
- Paola Binetti
- Antonio Misiani
- Daniele Marantelli
- Giovanni Sanga
- Lucia Codurelli
- Renzo Lusetti
- Pierangelo Ferrari
- Chiara Braga

===== Union of the Centre =====
- Savino Pezzotta
- Luca Volontè

===== Italy of Values =====
- Sergio Piffari
- Ivan Rota

==== Lombardy 3 (Cremona-Mantova-Pavia-Lodi) ====
===== The People of Freedom =====
- Gian Carlo Abelli
- Massimo Corsaro
- Maurizio Bernardo
- Chiara Moroni
- Andrea Orsini
- Carlo Nola

===== Democratic Party =====
- Antonello Soro
- Luciano Pizzetti
- Maurizio Turco
- Angelo Zucchi
- Marco Carra

===== Lega Nord =====
- Andrea Gibelli (replaced by Marco Maggioni on 18 May 2010)
- Gianni Fava
- Alberto Torazzi

===== Union of the Centre =====
- Anna Formisano (replaced by Pietro Marcazzan on 16 September 2010)

=== Senate ===
==== The People of Freedom ====
- Roberto Formigoni (replaced by Riccardo Conti on 4 June 2008)
- Alfredo Mantica
- Ombretta Colli
- Guido Possa
- Alessio Butti
- Giampiero Cantoni
- Marcello Dell'Utri
- Mario Mantovani
- Romano Comincioli (replaced by Antonio Del Pennino on 21 June 2011)
- Antonino Caruso
- Luigi Scotti (replaced by Alessandra Gallone on 9 December 2008)
- Antonio Tomassini
- Giancarlo Serafini
- Giuseppe Valditara
- Giacomo Caliendo
- Salvatore Sciascia
- Valerio Carrara
- Alfredo Messina
- Pierfrancesco Gamba

==== Democratic Party ====
- Umberto Veronesi (replaced by Francesco Monaco on 23 February 2011)
- Mauro Ceruti
- Pietro Ichino
- Emanuela Baio
- Gerardo D'Ambrosio
- Daniele Bosone
- Fiorenza Bassoli
- Tiziano Treu
- Luigi Vimercati
- Antonio Rusconi
- Guido Galperti
- Cinzia Fontana
- Giorgio Roilo
- Paolo Rossi
- Marilena Adamo

==== Lega Nord ====
- Roberto Calderoli
- Giuseppe Leoni
- Rosi Mauro
- Massimo Garavaglia
- Cesarino Monti
- Roberto Mura
- Sandro Mazzatorta
- Lorenzo Bodega
- Fabio Rizzi
- Armando Valli
- Irene Aderenti

==== Italy of Values ====
- Giuliana Carlino
- Giuseppe Astore
