= 2008 Italian Senate election in Lombardy =

- April 13, 2008

All 47 Lombard seats in the Italian Senate
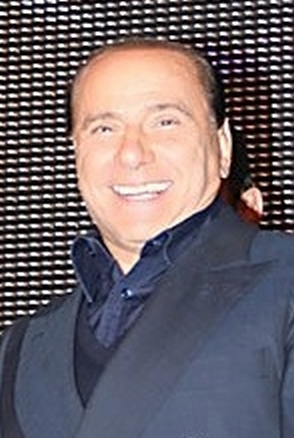

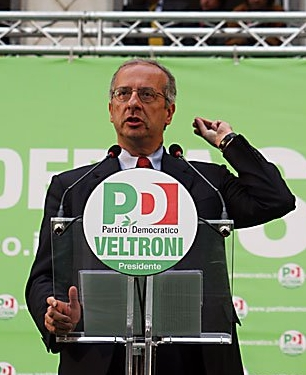
	First party	Second party
Leader	Silvio Berlusconi	Walter Veltroni
Party	People of Freedom	Democratic Party
Alliance	Centre-right	Centre-left
Last election	27 seats, 50.4% 57.0% as CdL	20 seats, 27.3% 42.6% as Union
Seats won	30	17
Seat change	▲3	▲3
Popular vote	3,139,694	1,823,835
Percentage	55.1%	32.0%
Swing	▲4.7%	▲4.7%
Local majority before election
Centre-right coalition
New local majority
Centre-right coalition

Lombardy renewed its delegation to the Italian Senate on April 13, 2008. This election was a part of national Italian general election of 2008 even if, according to the Italian Constitution, every senatorial challenge in each Region is a single and independent race.

The election was won by the centre-right coalition between The People of Freedom and Lega Nord, as it happened at the national level. The People of Freedom was the largest party in the election with 34%, ahead of the Democratic Party (28%) and Lega Nord (21%). All provinces gave a majority or a plurality to the new Prime Minister of Italy.

== Electoral law ==
The new electoral law for the Senate was established in 2005 by the Calderoli Law, and it is a form of semi-proportional representation. A party presents its own closed list and it can join other parties in alliances. The coalition which receives a plurality automatically wins at least 26 seats. Respecting this condition, seats are divided between coalitions, and subsequently to party lists, using the largest remainder method with a Hare quota. To receive seats, a party must overcome the barrage of 8% of the vote if it contests a single race, or of 3% of the vote if it runs in alliance.

== Results ==
Coalition leader	votes	votes (%)	seats	Party	votes	votes (%)	swing	seats	change
Silvio Berlusconi	3,139,694	55.1	30	The People of Freedom	1,959,681	34.4	-3.6	19	0
Silvio Berlusconi	3,139,694	55.1	30	Lega Nord	1,180,013	20.7	+9.6	11	+6
Walter Veltroni	1,823,835	32.0	17	Democratic Party	1,607,928	28.2	+5.8	15	+2
Walter Veltroni	1,823,835	32.0	17	Italy of Values	215,907	3.8	+1.2	2	+2
Pier Ferdinando Casini	240,481	4.2	-	Union of the Centre	240,481	4.2	-1.7	-	-3
Fausto Bertinotti	183,061	3.2	-	The Left – The Rainbow	183,061	3.2	-8.6	-	-7
Daniela Santanchè	93,077	1.6	-	The Right – Tricolour Flame	93,077	1.6	+0.5	-	-
Eva Rossi	45,622	0.8	-	Lega per l'Autonomia – Alleanza Lombarda	45,622	0.8	-0.8	-	-
Enrico Boselli	30,745	0.5	-	Socialist Party	30,745	0.5	-1.7	-	-
Marco Ferrando	27,141	0.5	-	Workers' Communist Party	27,141	0.5	+0.5	-	-
Renzo Rabellino	25,866	0.5	-	List of Talking Crickets	25,866	0.5	+0.5	-	-
Others	86,632	1.5	-	Others	86,632	1.5	-1.7	-	-
Total coalitions	5,696,154	100.0	47	Total parties	5,696,154	100.0	=	47	=

Source: Ministry of the Interior

== Lombard delegation to Senate ==
=== The People of Freedom ===
- Roberto Formigoni (replaced by Riccardo Conti on 4 June 2008)
- Alfredo Mantica
- Ombretta Colli
- Guido Possa
- Alessio Butti
- Giampiero Cantoni
- Marcello Dell'Utri
- Mario Mantovani
- Romano Comincioli
- Antonino Caruso
- Luigi Scotti (replaced by Alessandra Gallone on 9 December 2008)
- Antonio Tomassini
- Giancarlo Serafini
- Giuseppe Valditara
- Giacomo Caliendo
- Salvatore Sciascia
- Valerio Carrara
- Alfredo Messina
- Pierfrancesco Gamba

=== Democratic Party ===
- Umberto Veronesi
- Mauro Ceruti
- Pietro Ichino
- Emanuela Baio
- Gerardo D'Ambrosio
- Daniele Bosone
- Fiorenza Bassoli
- Tiziano Treu
- Luigi Vimercati
- Antonio Rusconi
- Guido Galperti
- Cinzia Fontana
- Giorgio Roilo
- Paolo Rossi
- Marilena Adamo

=== Lega Nord ===
- Roberto Calderoli
- Giuseppe Leoni
- Rosi Mauro
- Massimo Garavaglia
- Cesarino Monti
- Roberto Mura
- Sandro Mazzatorta
- Lorenzo Bodega
- Fabio Rizzi
- Armando Valli
- Irene Aderenti

=== Italy of Values ===
- Giuliana Carlino
- Gianpiero De Toni

== See also ==
- 2008 Italian general election
