= 2013 Italian Senate election in Lombardy =

- February 24, 2013

All 49 Lombard seats to the Italian Senate
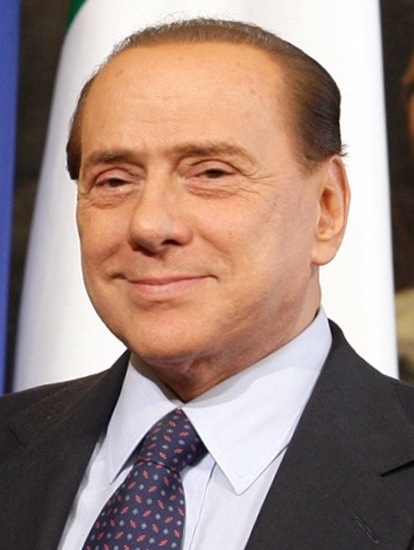

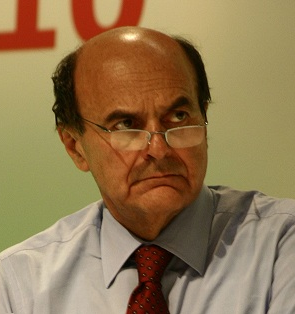
	First party	Second party
Leader	Silvio Berlusconi	Pier Luigi Bersani
Party	People of Freedom	Democratic Party
Alliance	Centre-right	Italy. Common Good
Last election	30 seats, 55.1%	17 seats, 32.0%
Seats won	27	11
Seat change	▼3	▼6
Popular vote	2,003,055	1,583,003
Percentage	37.6%	29.7%
Swing	▼17.5%	▼2.3%
Local majority before election
Centre-right coalition
New local majority
Centre-right coalition

Lombardy renewed its delegation to the Italian Senate on February 24, 2013. This election was a part of national Italian general election of 2013 even if, according to the Italian Constitution, every senatorial challenge in each Region is a single and independent race.

Lombardy obtained two more seats to the Senate, following the redistricting subsequent to the 2011 Census. For the first time in history, a senatorial election was paired with a regional election.

The election was won by the centre-right coalition between The People of Freedom and the Northern League, differently as it happened at national level and hugely contributing to create that hung parliament which was the general result of the 2013 vote. All the two coalitions lost votes to the newly created Five Star Movement of comedian Beppe Grillo and, in a minor scale, to the Civic Choice of incumbent PM Mario Monti. Ten provinces gave a plurality to the centre-right coalition, while the provinces of Milan and Mantua preferred Bersani's alliance.

== Electoral law ==
The electoral law for the Senate was established in 2005 by the Calderoli Law, and it is a form of semi-proportional representation. A party presents its own closed list and it can join other parties in alliances. The coalition which receives a plurality automatically wins at least 27 seats. Respecting this condition, seats are divided between coalitions, and subsequently to party lists, using the largest remainder method with a Hare quota. To receive seats, a party must overcome the barrage of 8% of the vote if it contests a single race, or of 3% of the vote if it runs in alliance.

== Results ==
Coalition leader	votes	votes (%)	seats	Party	votes	votes (%)	swing	seats	change
Silvio Berlusconi	2,003,055	37.6	27	The People of Freedom	1,109,411	20.8	−13.6	16	−3
Silvio Berlusconi	2,003,055	37.6	27	Northern League	730,645	13.7	−7.0	11	0
Silvio Berlusconi	2,003,055	37.6	27	Others	162,999	3.1	+1.5	-	-
Pier Luigi Bersani	1,583,003	29.7	11	Democratic Party	1,453,385	27.3	−0.9	11	−4
Pier Luigi Bersani	1,583,003	29.7	11	Others	129,639	2.4	+2.4	-	-
Beppe Grillo	927,951	17.4	7	Five Star Movement	927,951	17.4	+16.9	7	+7
Mario Monti	572,046	10.7	4	With Monti for Italy	572,046	10.7	+6.5	4	+4
Others	236,822	4.6	0	Others	236,822	4.6	−5.8	-	−2
Total coalitions	5,323,027	100.0	49	Total parties	5,323,027	100.0	=	49	+2

Source: Ministry of the Interior

== Lombard delegation to Senate ==
=== The People of Freedom ===
- Silvio Berlusconi
- Roberto Formigoni
- Sandro Bondi
- Paolo Bonaiuti
- Mario Mantovani
- Paolo Romani
- Giacomo Caliendo
- Paolo Galimberti
- Andrea Mandelli
- Alfredo Messina
- Salvatore Sciascia
- Francesco Colucci
- Antonio Verro
- Riccardo Conti
- Giancarlo Serafini
- Lucio Barani

=== Democratic Party ===
- Massimo Mucchetti
- Franco Mirabelli
- Emilia De Biasi
- Annalisa Silvestro
- Paolo Corsini
- Roberto Cociancich
- Luciano Pizzetti
- Lucrezia Ricchiuti
- Mauro Del Barba
- Mario Tronti
- Erica D'Adda

=== Northern League ===
- Roberto Calderoli
- Giulio Tremonti
- Massimo Garavaglia
- Giacomo Stucchi
- Silvana Comaroli
- Paolo Arrigoni
- Gian Marco Centinaio
- Raffaele Volpi
- Stefano Candiani
- Jonny Crosio
- Nunziante Consiglio

=== Five Star Movement ===
- Giovanna Mangili
- Vito Crimi
- Luigi Gaetti
- Monica Casaletto
- Laura Bignami
- Luis Alberto Orellana
- Bruno Marton

=== With Monti for Italy ===
- Gabriele Albertini
- Pietro Ichino
- Mario Mauro
- Benedetto Della Vedova

== Links ==
- 2013 Italian general election
