= Elections in Friuli-Venezia Giulia =

Italian regional elections

This page gathers the results of elections in Friuli-Venezia Giulia.

== Regional elections ==
=== Latest regional election ===
In the latest regional election, which took place on 2–3 April 2023, incumbent president Massimiliano Fedriga of Lega Friuli Venezia Giulia was re-elected by a landslide.

| Candidates | Votes | % | Seats | Parties | Votes | % | Seats |
|---|---|---|---|---|---|---|---|
| Massimiliano Fedriga | 314,824 | 64.24 | 1 | Lega Friuli-Venezia Giulia | 75,117 | 19.02 | 9 |
| Massimiliano Fedriga | 314,824 | 64.24 | 1 | Brothers of Italy | 71,503 | 18.10 | 8 |
| Massimiliano Fedriga | 314,824 | 64.24 | 1 | Fedriga for President | 70,192 | 17.77 | 8 |
| Massimiliano Fedriga | 314,824 | 64.24 | 1 | Forza Italia | 26,329 | 6.67 | 3 |
| Massimiliano Fedriga | 314,824 | 64.24 | 1 | Responsible Autonomy | 7,762 | 1.97 | – |
| Massimiliano Fedriga | 314,824 | 64.24 | 1 | Total | 250,903 | 63.53 | 28 |
| Massimo Moretuzzo | 139,018 | 28.37 | 1 | Democratic Party | 65,143 | 16.49 | 10 |
| Massimo Moretuzzo | 139,018 | 28.37 | 1 | Pact for Autonomy | 24,838 | 6.29 | 4 |
| Massimo Moretuzzo | 139,018 | 28.37 | 1 | Five Star Movement | 9,486 | 2.40 | 1 |
| Massimo Moretuzzo | 139,018 | 28.37 | 1 | Greens and Left Alliance | 8,029 | 2.03 | 1 |
| Massimo Moretuzzo | 139,018 | 28.37 | 1 | Open – Left FVG | 5,957 | 1.51 | 1 |
| Massimo Moretuzzo | 139,018 | 28.37 | 1 | Slovene Union | 4,016 | 1.02 | 1 |
| Massimo Moretuzzo | 139,018 | 28.37 | 1 | Total | 117,469 | 29.74 | 18 |
| Giorgia Tripoli | 22,840 | 4.66 | – | Together Free | 15,712 | 3.98 | – |
| Alessandro Maran | 13,374 | 2.73 | – | Action – Italia Viva – More Europe | 10,869 | 2.75 | – |
| Blank and invalid votes | 12,019 | 2.39 | | | | | |
| Total candidates | 490,056 | 100.00 | 2 | Total parties | 394,957 | 100.00 | 46 |
| Registered voters/turnout | 1,109,395 | 45.26 | | | | | |
Source: Friuli-Venezia Giulia Region

=== List of previous regional elections ===
- 1964 Friuli-Venezia Giulia regional election
- 1968 Friuli-Venezia Giulia regional election
- 1973 Friuli-Venezia Giulia regional election
- 1978 Friuli-Venezia Giulia regional election
- 1983 Friuli-Venezia Giulia regional election
- 1988 Friuli-Venezia Giulia regional election
- 1993 Friuli-Venezia Giulia regional election
- 1998 Friuli-Venezia Giulia regional election
- 2003 Friuli-Venezia Giulia regional election
- 2008 Friuli-Venezia Giulia regional election
- 2013 Friuli-Venezia Giulia regional election
- 2018 Friuli-Venezia Giulia regional election

== Italian general elections ==
- 1946 Italian general election in Friuli-Venezia Giulia
- 1948 Italian general election in Friuli-Venezia Giulia
- 1953 Italian general election in Friuli-Venezia Giulia
- 1958 Italian general election in Friuli-Venezia Giulia
- 1963 Italian general election in Friuli-Venezia Giulia
- 1968 Italian general election in Friuli-Venezia Giulia
- 1972 Italian general election in Friuli-Venezia Giulia
- 1976 Italian general election in Friuli-Venezia Giulia
- 1979 Italian general election in Friuli-Venezia Giulia
- 1983 Italian general election in Friuli-Venezia Giulia
- 1987 Italian general election in Friuli-Venezia Giulia
- 1992 Italian general election in Friuli-Venezia Giulia
- 1994 Italian general election in Friuli-Venezia Giulia
- 1996 Italian general election in Friuli-Venezia Giulia
- 2001 Italian general election in Friuli-Venezia Giulia
- 2006 Italian general election in Friuli-Venezia Giulia
- 2008 Italian general election in Friuli-Venezia Giulia
- 2013 Italian general election in Friuli-Venezia Giulia
- 2018 Italian general election in Friuli-Venezia Giulia
- 2022 Italian general election in Friuli-Venezia Giulia

== European Parliament elections ==
=== Latest EP election ===
| Party | Votes | % |
|---|---|---|
| Brothers of Italy | 164,336 | 34.0 |
| Democratic Party | 101,388 | 21.0 |
| Lega | 72,156 | 14.9 |
| Forza Italia–Us Moderates | 34,130 | 7.1 |
| Greens and Left Alliance | 29,507 | 6.1 |
| Five Star Movement | 26,218 | 5.4 |
| Action | 16,218 | 3.4 |
| United States of Europe | 16,387 | 3.1 |
| Peace Land Dignity | 13,654 | 2.8 |
| Freedom | 5,569 | 1.2 |
| South Tyrolean People's Party (Note: Including the Slovene Union.) | 3,481 | 0.7 |
| Popular Alternative | 1,492 | 0.3 |
| Total | 483,388 | 100.00 |

Source: Ministry of the Interior

=== List of previous EP elections ===
- 1979 European Parliament election in Friuli-Venezia Giulia
- 1984 European Parliament election in Friuli-Venezia Giulia
- 1989 European Parliament election in Friuli-Venezia Giulia
- 1994 European Parliament election in Friuli-Venezia Giulia
- 1999 European Parliament election in Friuli-Venezia Giulia
- 2004 European Parliament election in Friuli-Venezia Giulia
- 2009 European Parliament election in Friuli-Venezia Giulia
- 2014 European Parliament election in Friuli-Venezia Giulia
- 2019 European Parliament election in Friuli-Venezia Giulia
