= 2008 Italian general election in Friuli-Venezia Giulia =

The 2008 Italian general election took place on 13–14 April 2008. The election was won in Friuli-Venezia Giulia by the centre-right coalition between The People of Freedom and Lega Nord, as it happened at the national level. The People of Freedom was the largest party in the election with 34.7%, ahead of the Democratic Party (31.4%) and Lega Nord (13.0%).

== Results ==
=== Chamber of Deputies ===
Coalition leader	votes	votes (%)	seats	Party	votes	votes (%)	seats
Silvio Berlusconi	364,484	47.7	7	The People of Freedom	264,988	32.7	5
Silvio Berlusconi	364,484	47.7	7	Lega Nord	99,496	13.0	2
Walter Veltroni	272,092	35.6	5	Democratic Party	239,346	31.4	4
Walter Veltroni	272,092	35.6	5	Italy of Values	32,746	4.3	1
Pier Ferdinando Casini	46,051	6.0	1	Union of the Centre	46,051	6.0	1
Fausto Bertinotti	23,278	3.1	-	The Left – The Rainbow	23,278	3.1	-
Daniela Santanchè	22,585	3.0	-	The Right	22,585	3.0	-
Renzo Rabellino	8,403	1.1	-	List of Talking Crickets	8,403	1.1	-
Enrico Boselli	4,271	0.6	-	Socialist Party	4,271	0.6	-
Marco Ferrando	3,882	0.5	-	Workers' Communist Party	3,882	0.5	-
Flavia D'Angeli	3,609	0.5	-	Critical Left	3,609	0.5	-
Others	14,303	1.9	-	others	14,303	1.9	-
Total coalitions	762,958	100.0	13	Total parties	762,958	100.0	13

Source: Ministry of the Interior

=== Senate ===
Coalition leader	votes	votes (%)	seats	Party	votes	votes (%)	seats
Silvio Berlusconi	345,693	48.5	4	The People of Freedom	253,000	35.5	3
Silvio Berlusconi	345,693	48.5	4	Lega Nord	92,693	13.0	1
Walter Veltroni	257,807	36.1	3	Democratic Party	227,730	31.9	3
Walter Veltroni	257,807	36.1	3	Italy of Values	30,077	4.2	-
Pier Ferdinando Casini	42,956	6.0	-	Union of the Centre	42,956	6.0	-
Fausto Bertinotti	21,369	3.0	-	The Left – The Rainbow	21,369	3.0	-
Daniela Santanchè	17,424	2.4	-	The Right	17,424	2.4	-
Renzo Rabellino	7,494	1.1	-	List of Talking Crickets	7,494	1.1	-
Enrico Boselli	3,762	0.5	-	Socialist Party	3,762	0.5	-
Others	12,833	1.8	-	others	12,833	1.8	-
Total coalitions	713,193	100.0	7	Total parties	713,193	100.0	7

Source: Ministry of the Interior

== MPs elected in Friuli-Venezia Giulia ==
=== Chamber of Deputies ===
==== The People of Freedom ====
- Franco Frattini
- Roberto Menia
- Roberto Antonione
- Isidoro Gottardo
- Manlio Contento

==== Democratic Party ====
- Alessandro Maran
- Ivano Strizzolo
- Ettore Rosato
- Maria Antonietta Coscioni

==== Lega Nord ====
- Fulvio Follegot
- Massimiliano Fedriga

==== Italy of Values ====
- Carlo Monai

==== Union of the Centre ====
- Angelo Compagnon

=== Senate ===
==== The People of Freedom ====
- Giulio Camber
- Giovanni Collino
- Ferruccio Saro

==== Democratic Party ====
- Carlo Pegorer
- Tamara Blažina
- Flavio Pertoldi

==== Lega Nord ====
- Mario Pittoni
