= Bassoli =

Bassoli is an Italian surname. Notable people with the surname include:

- Alessandro Bassoli (born 1990), Italian footballer
- Giacomo Bassoli (born 1990), Italian footballer, twin brother of Alessandro
- Fiorenza Bassoli (1948–2020), Italian politician
