= 2024 European Parliament election in Friuli-Venezia Giulia =

The European Parliament election of 2024 took place in Italy on 8–9 June 2024.

In Friuli-Venezia Giulia, in a huge reversal from the previous election in 2019, the Brothers of Italy came first with 34.0% of the vote, followed by the Democratic Party (21.0%) and the League (14.9%), represented by the Friuli-Venezia Giulia League in the region.

== Results ==
Party	Votes	%
Brothers of Italy	164,336	34.0
Democratic Party	101,388	21.0
Lega	72,156	14.9
Forza Italia–Us Moderates	34,130	7.1
Greens and Left Alliance	29,507	6.1
Five Star Movement	26,218	5.4
Action	16,218	3.4
United States of Europe	16,387	3.1
Peace Land Dignity	13,654	2.8
Freedom	5,569	1.2
South Tyrolean People's Party (Note: Including the Slovene Union.)	3,481	0.7
Popular Alternative	1,492	0.3
Total	483,388	100.00

Source: Ministry of the Interior
