= Gianluca Bocchi =

Italian philosopher (born 1954)

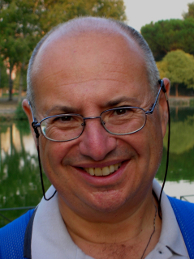
- Born: 19 December 1954 (age 71); Milan, Italy

Philosophical work
- Era: 20th-century philosophy
- Region: Western Philosophy
- School: Epistemology of Complexity

Gianluca Bocchi (born 19 December 1954) is an Italian philosopher.

== Life ==
Gianluca Bocchi studied Philosophy at the University of Milan where he graduated in Philosophy of Science in 1978, discussing a dissertation entitled "Conditions and rules in the context of contemporary scientific epistemology" (supervisors: Ludwig Geymonat and Giulio Giorello). From 1983 to 1988, he taught Philosophy and worked as a researcher at the Faculty of Psychology and Educational Sciences of the University of Geneva, carrying on his research within the scientific team coordinated by Alberto Munari, one of the main exponents of the Piagetian school of genetic epistemology; and has worked extensively with Edgar Morin in Paris on the themes of complexity and complex thinking.

== Works ==
Apart from its academic research and teaching engagements at the university, he has also been working as an author, lecturer, scientific consultant and trainer. He has been working as a project manager and scientific trainer within a number of training projects promoted by leading Italian companies (such as Omnitel, ISVOR-FIAT, Telespazio, RAI, Unilever, ENEL, ENI, IBM, HP, Unicredit, Banca Intesa, Banca Mediolanum, Publitalia, etc.) as well as within training courses for teachers, psychotherapists, and managers of "human systems". He has been giving a number of lectures and seminars in various post-graduate Master courses, and he has especially been working with the TSM-Trento School of Management. He lectured and lectures extensively for managerial audiences on the political and cultural international landscapes in the age of globalization; on human evolution; on scientific and philosophical themes of complexity and change (how the understanding of patterns of change in natural and human history can help us in facing the ubiquitous challenge of change in human organizations).

He has been guiding a number of "study tours", especially to Berlin and the United States, devoted to managers and students and mainly concerning the topic of innovation and identity. In particular, he is currently organizing 'study tours' (Berlin, Istanbul, Prague, Lisbon) on behalf of the section devoted to Training and Work of the Italian Province of Trento (Formazione e Lavoro della Provincia di Trento) and on behalf of a Federation of banks of the Italian Region "Trentino" (Federazione delle Casse Rurali del Trentino). In 2009 and 2010, different groups of students from the University of Bergamo attended "study tours" to Berlin and Stockholm.

Gianluca Bocchi is currently Full Professor at Bergamo University, Italy, Department of Human and Social Sciences, where he teaches Philosophy of Sciences, Global History and Global Sciences. His courses address epistemological issues concerning life sciences, history and the main controversies within the tradition of evolutionary studies, the current major developments within the sciences of complex systems, the philosophical question of identity, the relationship between natural sciences and human sciences, the epistemological reflection regarding both history and geography. He is currently also Director of the Centre for Research on Complexity (CE.R.CO) at the University of Bergamo, which research activities are devoted to theories, researches and practices concerning complex systems in human, social and natural sciences. He is also scientifically responsible for the University of Bergamo of the EU 7FP project "Bordering, Political Landscapes and Social Arenas: Potentials and Challenges of Evolving Border Concepts in a Post-Cold War World" (acronym EUBORDERSCAPES, 2012/2016).

Apart from his role as Professor at the University of Bergamo, Gianluca Bocchi is also teaching Global History and supervising PhD students and PostDoc fellows within the PhD Programme in Anthropology and Epistemology of Complexity. From 2002 to 2006, he was also the Scientific Coordinator of the PhD Programme in Anthropology and Epistemology of Complexity. Gianluca Bocchi introduced, indeed, complexity studies in Italy with the volume La sfida della complessità (with Mauro Ceruti, Feltrinelli, 1985) that focuses on the changing paradigms of sciences in the present times as well as the number of modes human beings adopt to inhabit the globe. With Mauro Ceruti and Edgar Morin, he is the author of the book L'Europa nell'era planetaria (Sperling & Kupfer, 1991), where the authors reflect on the complex issue of the co-habitation of different people and nations in the Europe of the 90s and on the main trends of the world history at the beginning of the new millennium. In 1993 he published Origini di storie (with Mauro Ceruti, Feltrinelli), in which the authors attempt to investigate the complex relations between science, history and myth, by focusing in particular on images of biological evolutions as well as on the evolutions of natural and human history within contemporary sciences. With Mauro Ceruti, he also published Solidarietà o barbarie. L'Europa delle diversità contro la pulizia etnica (Raffaello Cortina, 1994) that wants to be a sort of manual for citizens of the new Europe, as writes Edgar Morin in the preface to the book, by proposing a critical analysis of the historical roots of the European civilization and of European nations in the light of the major events of the present times, that are so ambivalent being at the same time full of constructive and deconstructive potential. In 2001, he edited with Mauro Ceruti the volume Le radici prime dell'Europa (Bruno Mondadori), an interdisciplinary collection of the most important reflections (mostly genetic, linguistic and archaeological) that allow us to re-construct the long-term European history making reference, in particular, to migration routes (of people and cultures) that took place through the continent. In the volume, special attention is also devoted to the issue of ethnic identities in Europe both in the past and in the present. Another interesting book on the origins of Western civilization and world history is Origini della scrittura. Genealogie di un'invenzione (with Mauro Ceruti, Raffaello Cortina, 2002). In 2004, he wrote the book Educazione e Globalizzazione (with Mauro Ceruti, Raffaello Cortina), where the authors propose a way to reform the national educational system by taking into account the major changes that have been occurring in both the international geo-political and geo-economical scenarios as well as in the forms and contents of our knowledge instruments for interpreting them. In 2009, he published the book Una e molteplice. Ripensare l'Europa (with Mauro Ceruti, Raffaello Cortina), an attempt to consider both the critical aspects of and the future opportunities inscribed in the present European continent's history as well as in the most recent development of the European Union, 20 years after the Berlin Wall fall in 1989. In 2013, he published the book Le vie della formazione. Creatività, innovazione, complessità (with Francesco Varanini, Guerini).

One of the main foci of Gianluca Bocchi's current scientific research is devoted to the epistemological questions arising for biological and evolutionary sciences, in an age where there is a proliferation of empirical and sometimes very surprising results concerning our knowledge of living systems: they do need a new philosophical frame to make them relevant for our enquiry concerning man, nature and society. Other main current fields of enquiry in Gianluca Bocchi's interrogation are: global history and human evolution; paradigmatic changes in the way of seeing and imagining the world by contemporary sciences; interactions, clashes and hybridizations of cultures; cultural stratifications, urban boundaries and planning strategies in contemporary European cities; social trends and institutional responses in political European systems; origins and developments of national and ethnical identities; politics and governance of globalization; the relationship between emerging technologies and human identities; the elaboration of a new philosophical view of change connecting models developed in natural and human sciences; philosophical implications of the rapid growing "sciences of the artificial" (synthetic biology plus robotics).

== Selected bibliography ==
- Disordine e costruzione. Un'interpretazione epistemologica dell'opera di Jean Piaget (with M. Ceruti), Milan, Feltrinelli, 1981.
- Modi di pensare postdarwiniani. Saggio sul pluralismo evolutivo (with M. Ceruti), Bari, Dedalo, 1984.
- La sfida della complessità, (with M. Ceruti), Milan, Feltrinelli, 1985.
- Un nouveau commencement, (with M. Ceruti and E. Morin), Seuil, Paris, 1991.
- L'Europa nell'era planetaria, (with M. Ceruti and E. Morin), Milan, Sperling and Kupfer, 1991.
- Origini di storie, (with M. Ceruti), Milano, Feltrinelli, 1993.
- La formazione come costruzione di nuovi mondi, Rome, Formez-Censis, 1993.
- Solidarietà o barbarie. L'Europa delle diversità contro la pulizia etnica, (with M. Ceruti) Milan, Raffaello Cortina, 1994.
- Origini della scrittura. Genealogie di un'invenzione, (with M. Ceruti), Milan, Bruno Mondadori, 2002.
- Educazione e globalizzazione, (with M. Ceruti), Milan, Raffaello Cortina, 2004.
- Una e molteplice. Ripensare l'Europa, (with M. Ceruti), Milan, Tropea, 2009.
- Le città di Berlino, (with Laura Peters), Università di Bologna, 2009.
- Le vie della formazione. Creatività, innovazione, complessità, (with Francesco Varanini), Milan, Guerini, 2013.
