= Filippo Penati =

Italian politician (1952–2019)

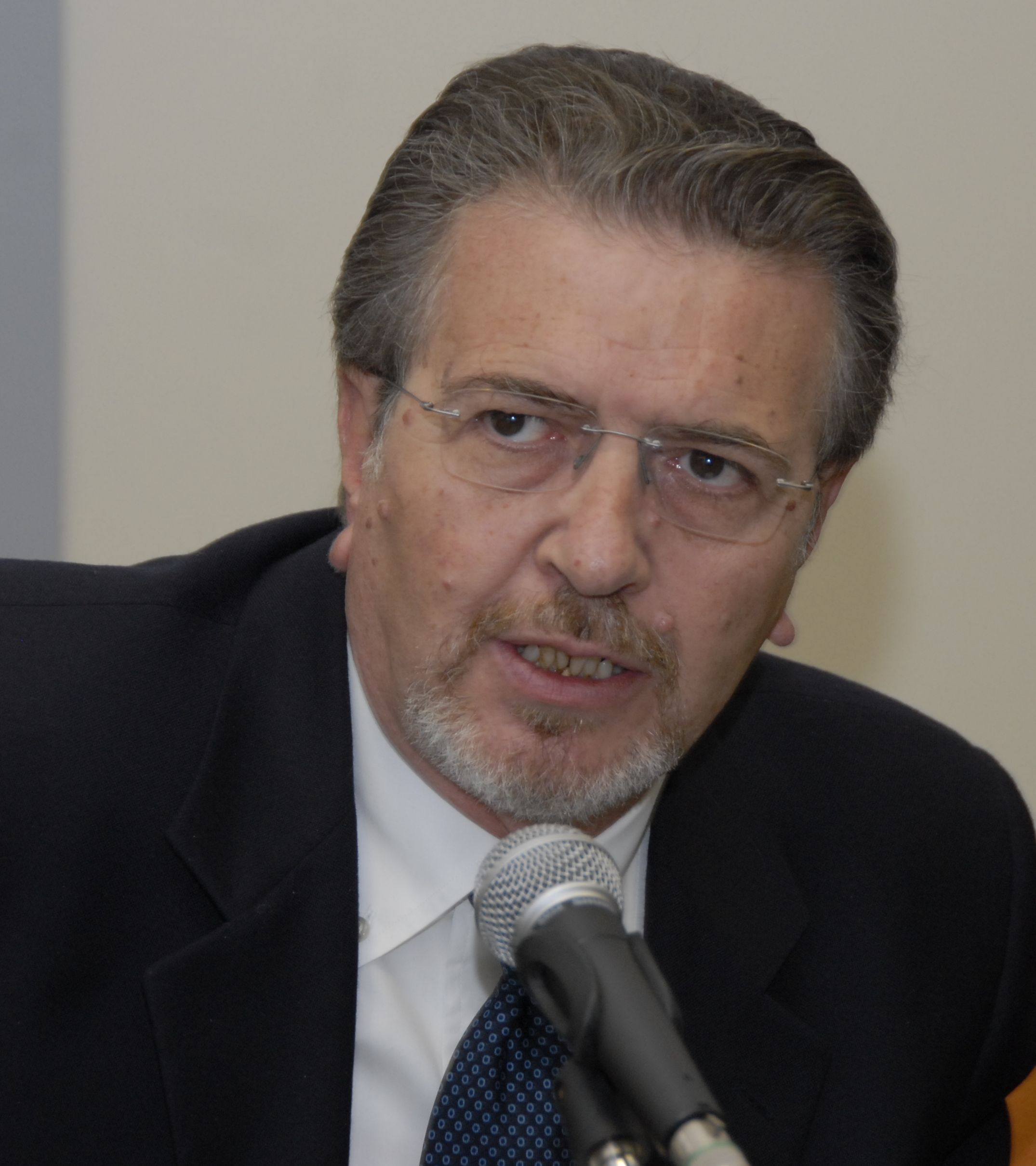

President of the Province of Milan
- In office 27 June 2004 – 21 June 2009
- Preceded by: Ombretta Colli
- Succeeded by: Guido Podestà

Mayor of Sesto San Giovanni
- In office 12 June 1994 – 26 May 2002
- Preceded by: Fiorenza Bassoli
- Succeeded by: Giorgio Oldrini

Personal details
- Born: Filippo Luigi Penati; 30 December 1952 Monza, Italy
- Died: 9 October 2019 (aged 66) Sesto San Giovanni, Italy
- Party: PCI (until 1991); PDS (1991–1998); DS (1998–2007); Independent (2011–2017); PD (2007–2011, 2017–2019)

Filippo Luigi Penati (30 December 1952 – 9 October 2019) was an Italian politician. Born in Monza, He was mayor of Sesto San Giovanni between 1994 and 2001, and president of the Province of Milan between 2004 and 2009. He died in Sesto San Giovanni, aged 66.
