= Giacomo Properzj =

Italian politician (1939–2022)

President of the Province of Milan
- In office 1990–1992
- Preceded by: Goffredo Andreini
- Succeeded by: Michele D'Elia

Personal details
- Born: Giacomo Properzj Incisa Beccaria di Santo Stefano; 13 March 1939 Milan, Italy
- Died: 9 January 2022 (aged 82) Milan, Italy
- Party: PRI

Giacomo Properzj Incisa Beccaria di Santo Stefano (13 March 1939 – 9 January 2022) was an Italian politician. A member of the Italian Republican Party, he served as president of the Province of Milan from 1990 to 1992. Properzj sold to Silvio Berlusconi the local tv station Telemilano that later became Canale 5. He was the president of Azienda Trasporti Milanesi, too. Properzj died in Milan on 9 January 2022, at the age of 82.
