= Guido Podestà =

Italian politician

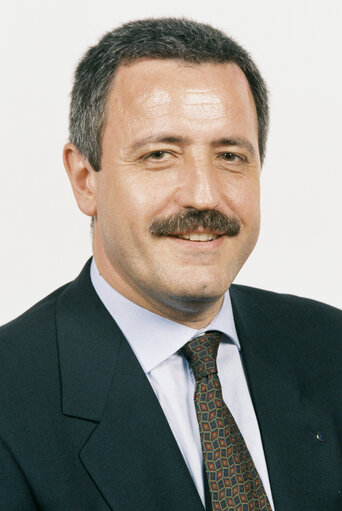
Guido PODESTA, MEP

Guido Podestà (born 1 April 1947 in Milan) is an Italian politician and former Member of the European Parliament for North-West with the Forza Italia, part of the European People's Party and sat on the European Parliament's Committee on the Internal Market and Consumer Protection. He was elected president of the province of Milan on 2009/06/22, replacing the centre-left candidate Filippo Penati, whom he beat in a runoff vote.

He was a substitute for the Committee on Agriculture and Rural Development and the Committee on the Environment, Public Health and Food Safety.

== Education ==
- Graduate in architecture
- Member of the Presidential Committee of Forza Italia (since 2002), national official responsible for 'European enlargement and relations with Eastern Europe'

== Career ==
- since 1994: Member of the European Parliament
- Vice-President of the European Parliament (1997–2004), with responsibility for relations between the European Parliament and the national parliaments of the 15 Member States, relations with the enlargement countries, Balkan non-candidate countries and the Conference of Community and European Affairs Committees of Parliaments of the European Union
- Chairman of the EP Intergroup on senior citizens
- President of the Province of Milan

== See also ==
- 2004 European Parliament election in Italy
