= Gianmarco Mazzi =

Italian politician (born 1960)

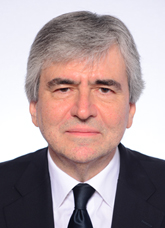
- Mazzi in 2022

Minister of Tourism
- Incumbent
- Assumed office 3 April 2026
- Prime Minister: Giorgia Meloni
- Preceded by: Daniela Santanchè; Giorgia Meloni (acting)

Member of the Chamber of Deputies
- Incumbent
- Assumed office 13 October 2022
- Constituency: Veneto

Personal details
- Born: 1 July 1960 (age 66) Verona, Veneto, Italy
- Party: Brothers of Italy
- Education: University of Verona

Gianmarco Mazzi (born 1 July 1960) is an Italian politician serving as Minister of Tourism since 2026. A member of the Chamber of Deputies since 2022, from 2022 to 2026 he served as undersecretary of the Ministry of Culture. Prior to that, he also worked as artistic director for several editions of the Sanremo Music Festival.
