= Liceo classico Cavour =

Liceo in Turin, Italy

Coordinates: 45°04′40″N 7°39′21″E

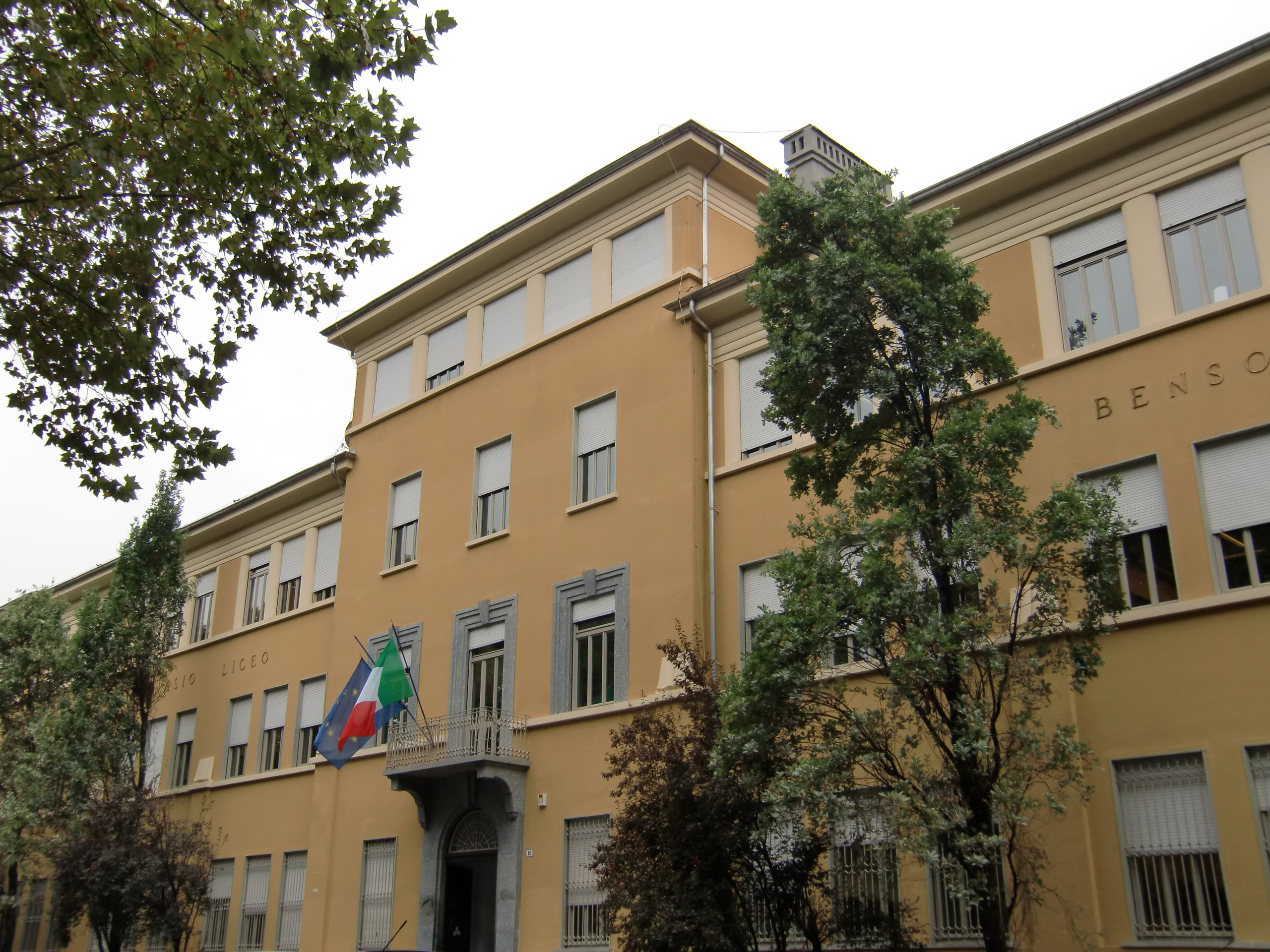
Liceo Ginnasio statale "Camillo Benso di Cavour", corso Tassoni 15, 10143 Turin, Italy. Main entrance (1931).

Liceo Ginnasio statale "Camillo Benso di Cavour" is the oldest Liceo classico in Turin and one among the oldest and most prominent high schools in Italy, for pupils aged 14 to 19. It was transferred to its present location in 1931.

== History ==
It was founded in 1568 with the name of Collegio dei Nobili (it. for College of Nobles) by Emmanuel Philibert, Duke of Savoy, after he moved (1563) the capital of his States from Chambéry to Turin, and was assigned to Jesuits. For many centuries, it has been the most prominent high school in the Duchy of Savoy and thereafter (from 1713) in the Kingdom of Sardinia. In 1787, the College moved from its older Palace (assigned later to Accademia delle Scienze and to Museo Egizio) to the Palace of the (suppressed) Convento del Carmine. It became a Lycée (on December 23, 1805) in Piedmont annexed to the First French Empire. At the fall of Napoleon I, King Victor Emmanuel I of Sardinia restored it as Collegio Reale Maggiore (Royal College) in 1818 and reassigned it to Jesuits. In 1848, after the First Italian War of Independence under King Charles Albert of Sardinia, it was the first educational institution in the Kingdom to come under direct control of the State. The College became a Liceo classico in 1859 under the Law of Education of the Kingdom of Sardinia and courses began in 1860–1861; in 1865 the school was finally named after Camillo Benso, conte di Cavour; in these years (1861–1865) it was the leading high school of the capital of the united Kingdom of Italy. From 1911 to 1923, a Liceo Moderno was added to the Liceo classico. In 1931, the school moved to corso Tassoni, 15, in a new location, due to increasing numbers of students.

== Teaching ==
The original curriculum (1568) focused on Rhetoric and Latin; since 1848, the emphasis has been on classical studies, mainly Latin and Classical Greek, and (with changes made in 1923 and later improvements in courses of study) it still emphasizes on Latin language (from first to fifth year) and Latin Literature (third to fifth year), Ancient Greek Language (first to fifth year) and Ancient Greek literature (third to fifth year), Humanities and Classics, although with the increasing support of sciences.

== Liceo Cavour today ==
Liceo Cavour provides good quality education, for which it has always been renowned in Turin. The school ranked first in the research made by the Fondazione Giovanni Agnelli and published in January 2009. By now, it is a larger school than it has been for much of its history. In the 1870s, there were about 350 students; today, there are about 930–950. Almost all of the school's pupils go to universities after graduation. In 2009–2010, the TV Series «Fuori classe» was partially filmed at the school (the fiction, about an Italian high school and its teachers and students, has been broadcast from January 2011, by the Italian state-owned public service broadcaster RAI).

== Alumni ==
Liceo Cavour has a long list of distinguished former pupils, including Luigi Einaudi, who served (1948–1955) as second President of the Italian Republic. Past pupils include the mathematician Giuseppe Peano, Agostino Richelmy, who served as Archbishop of Turin from 1897, and Cardinal of the Roman Catholic Church, the poet Guido Gozzano (for three years), Cesare Pavese (for three years), Ludovico Geymonat, Franco Venturi, Raf Vallone, and Livio Berruti, the surprising winner of the 200 m in the 1960 Summer Olympics.

== Bibliography ==
- Golzio, Armando, Liceo Cavour. Progetto Educativo d'Istituto, 1996-1997 (Turin, Liceo Cavour, 1996), pages 9–19.
- Kingdom of Sardinia, Law October 4, 1848, n. 819.
- Kingdom of Sardinia, Law November 13, 1859, n. 3725.
- Kingdom of Italy, Law March 4, 1865, n. 2229.
- Martinengo, Maria Teresa, L'Università dà il voto alle scuole superiori. La ricerca promossa dalla Fondazione Agnelli. Il Cavour batte tutti. «La Stampa», 28 gennaio 2009.
- Fondazione Agnelli - Graduatorie Scuole Piemonte ("effetto scuola").
- Conti, Paolo,«Fuori classe»: con la prof Littizzetto alla scoperta della scuola pubblica. «Corriere della Sera», 15 agosto 2009.
- Platzer, Tiziana, Al severo Cavour gli studenti giocano a fare il cinema. Nella scuola il set della fiction «Fuori classe». «La Stampa», 20 gennaio 2011.

== See also ==
- Liceo Classico
