= List of presidents of the Province of Milan =

President of the Province of Milan
- Presidente della Provincia di Milano
- Inaugural holder: Francesco Gorla
- Formation: 1889
- Final holder: Guido Podestà
- Abolished: 2014
- Superseded by: Metropolitan mayor of Milan

The president of the Province of Milan was the head of the provincial administration of Milan, a local government authority in Lombardy, Italy.

== History ==
The office of president of the Province of Milan was established in 1889, initially within the Provincial Deputation. Before that date, the Deputation was headed by the prefect. During the Fascist period (1927–1945), the province was governed by appointed officials, including Royal Commissioners and presidents of reorganised provincial structures under central control.

After World War II, the office was restored and gradually redefined within the Italian Republic, first with indirect election by the Provincial Council and, from 1995, with direct popular election.

The province was eventually replaced in 2015 by the Metropolitan City of Milan.

== List ==
=== Presidents of the Provincial Deputation (1889–1929) ===
No.	Portrait	Name	Term of office		Party
No.	Portrait	Name	Start	End	Party
1		Francesco Gorla	1889	1899	
2		Paolo Manusardi	1899	1918	
3		Edgardo De Capitani di Vimercate	1918	1920	
4		Nino Levi	1920	1922	Italian Socialist Party
5		Sileno Fabbri	1922	1929	National Fascist Party

=== Presidents of the Provincial Rectorate (1929–1945) ===
No.	Portrait	Name	Term of office		Party
No.	Portrait	Name	Start	End	Party
1		Sileno Fabbri	1929	1931	National Fascist Party
2		Jenner Mataloni	1931	1935	National Fascist Party
3		Mario Belloni	1935	1938	National Fascist Party
4		Franco Marinotti	1938	1943	National Fascist Party
–		Felice Vinci (Prefectural commissioner)	1943	1943	
–		Pietro Bottini (Prefectural commissioner)	1943	1945	

=== Presidents of the Provincial Deputation (1945–1951) ===
No.	Portrait	Name	Term of office		Party
No.	Portrait	Name	Start	End	Party
1		Luigi Fossati	1945	1946	Italian Socialist Party
2		Giovanni Battista Migliori	1946	1948	Christian Democracy
3		Giordano Dell'Amore	1948	1951	Christian Democracy

=== Presidents of the Province (1951–2014) ===
No.	Portrait	Name	Term of office		Party
No.	Portrait	Name	Start	End	Party
1		Giordano Dell'Amore	1951	1952	Christian Democracy
2		Adrio Casati	1952	1965	Christian Democracy
3		Erasmo Peracchi	1965	1974	Christian Democracy
4		Mario Bassani	1974	1975	Christian Democracy
5		Roberto Vitali	1975	1980	Italian Communist Party
6		Antonio Taramelli	1980	1983	Italian Communist Party
7		Novella Sansoni	1983	1985	Italian Communist Party
8		Ezio Riva	1985	1986	Christian Democracy
9		Goffredo Andreini	27 October 1986	8 August 1990	Italian Communist Party
10		Giacomo Properzj	8 August 1990	31 December 1991	Italian Republican Party
11		Michele D'Elia	31 December 1991	19 May 1992	Italian Liberal Party
12		Goffredo Andreini	3 July 1992	28 May 1994	Communist Refoundation Party
13		Massimo Zanello	28 May 1994	8 May 1995	Lega Nord
14		Livio Tamberi	8 May 1995	28 June 1999	Italian People's Party
15		Ombretta Colli	28 June 1999	28 June 2004	Forza Italia
16		Filippo Penati	28 June 2004	23 June 2009	Democrats of the Left
17		Guido Podestà	23 June 2009	31 December 2014	The People of Freedom

== See also ==
- Mayor of Milan
- Metropolitan City of Milan

== Sources ==
- "Storia amministrativa dell'ente". Ministero dell'Interno.
- "I Presidenti della Provincia di Milano dal 1859 al 2015". La Provincia di Milano. Archived from the original on 2024-06-19.
- Menichini, Piera (2005). "I presidenti delle Province dall'Unità alla Grande guerra: repertorio analitico". Storia Amministrazione Costituzione (13): 265–266.
