= Antonio Angelucci =

Italian politician and entrepreneur (born 1944)

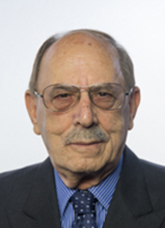

Member of the Chamber of Deputies
- Incumbent
- Assumed office 29 April 2008

Personal details
- Born: 16 September 1944 (age 82) Sante Marie, Italy
- Party: FI (2008–2009); PdL (2009–2013); FI (2013–2022); Lega (since 2022)
- Profession: Politician, entrepreneur

Antonio Angelucci (born 16 September 1944) is an Italian politician and entrepreneur. As an entrepreneur, he works in healthcare (the chain of structures that belong to the San Raffaele Roman hospital), in real estate, and publishing (Il Tempo, Corriere dell'Umbria, Libero through a foundation and, since 2023, Il Giornale).

== Biography ==
He was born in Sante Marie, province of L'Aquila, on 16 September 1944. He has been elected deputy for The People of Freedom in the IV circumscription (Lombardy 2) in 2008. During his political career, Angelucci was member of several parliamentary boards: the VI board (Finance) and the X board (Productive activities, trade and tourism).

As of 2026, he has been absent from the Italian Parliament 99.9% of the time, most likely the most in any Western democracies.
