= Mauro Ceruti =

Italian philosopher

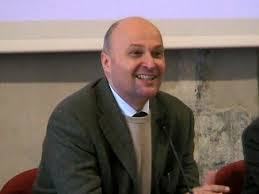
- Born: 16 July 1953 (age 73); Cremona, Italy
- Education: University of Milan
- Occupation: Philosopher

Mauro Ceruti (born 16 July 1953, in Cremona, Italy) is an Italian philosopher. He is one of the pioneers and developers of Complex Systems Theories, Methods and Epistemologies, and of the trans-disciplinary research line usually called "Complex Thinking", which aims at the innovation of the paradigms of (scientific) rationality.

Ceruti's philosophical reflections and productions are at the intersection between a plurality of research domains, among which they stimulate inter- and trans-disciplinary debate on complexity: Epistemology, Natural Sciences, Human Sciences, Sciences of Organization and Management, and others.

His writings have been published in Italian, English, French, German, Portuguese, Romanian, Spanish, and Turkish.

== Research profile ==
Mauro Ceruti studied philosophy at the University of Milan (Italy) with Ludovico Geymonat, focusing on Philosophy and History of Science, and, in particular, on Jean Piaget's Genetic Epistemology. In this period, Ceruti produced on the latter topic an in-depth study and interpretation, which was published later in a book that he wrote together with Gianluca Bocchi.

From 1981 to 1986, Ceruti worked at the University of Geneva, Faculty of Psychology and Educational Sciences, and at the Genetic Epistemology International Centre founded by Jean Piaget. In these years, he developed the definition of an innovative research line within Philosophy of Science, based on analyses and elaborations of the epistemological implications of the Evolutionary Sciences. Within this framework, Ceruti developed a research program in Evolutionary Epistemology that draws on contemporary theories of biological evolution, the history of ideas and genetic psychology.

Starting from the 80s, Ceruti had been collaborating with Alberto Munari and Donata Fabbri at the Cultural Psychology Center of Geneva, Ilya Prigogine at Université Libre of Brussels, Henri Atlan and Francisco Varela at CREA (Research Center in Applied Epistemology, Paris), Jean-Louis Le Moigne at the MCX (Modelisation of Complexity) Program, and Ervin Laszlo and GERG (General Evolution Research Group, San Diego).

Between 1986 and 1993, Ceruti started to collaborate with Edgar Morin at the CETSAP (Research Center in Transdisciplinary Studies, Sociology, Anthropology, Politics, Paris), developing and expanding his Evolutionary Epistemology project to create a new trans-disciplinary research program, dedicated to structuring an Anthropology and Epistemology of Complex Systems, as well as a Complex Anthropology and Epistemology.

Since 1985, Ceruti has been organising a series of symposia, as well as structuring a wide research network on the main research topics of the emerging Sciences of Complex Systems. They included, besides the already mentioned pioneers of these domains of inquiry, also Jerome Bruner, Heinz von Foerster, Ernst von Glasersfeld, Susan Oyama, Isabelle Stengers, William Thompson, Lynn Margulis, James Lovelock, Stephen J. Gould, Niles Eldredge, Brian Goodwin, Evan Thompson, Giulio Giorello, Paul Feyerabend, Paul Watzlawick, and René Thom, among others. These collaborations and synergies found their expression in collective publications, among which is La sfida della complessità. This work, edited by Ceruti with Gianluca Bocchi, initiated in Italy one of the most relevant philosophical debates of the last decades, and, at the international level, contributed to connect innovative lines of inquiry within the Sciences of Complex Systems in a unitary trans-disciplinary research direction that, since the late 80s, is commonly called "Epistemology of Complex Systems". Together with Ceruti's following books, this work stimulated epistemological reflections on the paradigms of contemporary sciences, and the emergence of new research perspectives in many different disciplines and social practices: from Architecture to Sociology and Anthropology, from Clinical Psychology to Management and Organization Sciences, from Educational Sciences to the Cognitive Sciences and Philosophy of Mind, from History to the Sciences of Globalization.

Between the 80s and the 90s, Ceruti founded and directed three scientific journals dedicated to the development of "Complex Thinking": La Casa di Dedalo, Oikos and Pluriverso.

Since 1994 Ceruti has been Professor in the domain of Epistemology and Philosophy of Science in different Italian universities: the University of Parma, the Polytechnic of Milan, the University of Palermo, the Bicocca University of Milan, the University of Bergamo (where he founded the Research Center on Complex Systems CERCO, as well as a Doctoral School in Anthropology and Epistemology of Complex Systems), and the IULM University of Milan.

Currently, he isa member of the following Scientific Committees and Advisory Boards:

- European Association for the Modelization of Complexity, MCX, Paris
- Edgar Morin Chair of Complexity, ESSEC Business School - École Supérieur des Sciences Économiques et Commerciales, Paris
- Multiversidad Mundo Real Edgar Morin, Hermosillo
- Italian Association for Medicine and Systemic Health, ASSIMSS, Rome;
- Italian National Centre of Social Prevention and Defense, Milan;
- Italian Gruppoanalitica Society, SGAI, Milan
- Milan Center for Family Therapy, CMTF, Milan
- IULM Research Center in Advances Studies in Human Sciences (IULM, Milan)
- WWF Italy
- "Diogène", journal of the International Council for Philosophy and Human Sciences
- "World Futures. The Journal of General Evolution", Gordon and Beach Science Publishers, New York

== Short bibliography ==
- Ceruti M. (2015), La fine dell'onniscienza, Studium, Roma, Preface by Giulio Giorello
- Morin E., Ceruti M. (2013), La nostra Europa, Raffaello Cortina Editore, Milano (tr. in French: Notre Europe, Fayard, Paris, 2014; tr. in Spanish: Nuestra Europa, Paidós Ibérica, Barcelona, 2013; tr. in Turkish: Bizim Avrupamiz, İletişim Yayinlari, İstambul, 2014)
- Bocchi G, Ceruti M (2011). L'humanité, un destin en devenir. HERMES, vol. 60, pp. 58–63
- Ceruti M., Treu (2010), Organizzare l'altruismo, Laterza, Roma-Bari
- Bocchi G, Ceruti M (2009). Una e molteplice - Ripensare l'Europa, Tropea, Milano (tr. in Romanian: Una şi multiplă - Să regândim Europa, Curtea Veche, Bucarest, 2013)
- Ceruti M. (1986; 2nd ed. 2009) Il vincolo e la possibilità, Feltrinelli, Milano, 1986, Preface by Heinz von Foerster – Second Edition Raffaello Cortina Editore, Milano, 2009 (tr. in English: Constraints and possibilities, Gordon and Breach, New York, 1996, Preface by Heinz von Foerster; tr. in Portuguese: Vìnculo e a Possibilidade, Instituto Piaget, Lisbona, 1995, Preface by Heinz von Foerster; tr. in Spanish: Hombre. Conocimiento y pedagogía, Trillas, Mexico City, 1994, Preface by Heinz von Foerster)
- Bocchi G., Ceruti M. (1986; 2nd ed. 2009) Origini di storie, Feltrinelli, Milano, 1993; Second Edition: 2009, Preface by Jerome Bruner (tr. in English: The Narrative Universe, Hampton Press, Cresskill 2002, Preface by Jerome Bruner; tr. in Spanish: El Sentido de la Historia, Editorial Débate, Madrid 1994, Preface by Jerome Bruner; tr. in Portuguese: Histórias e origens, Instituto Piaget, Lisbona 1997, Preface by Jerome Bruner)
- Bocchi G., Ceruti M., Eds (1985; 2nd ed. 2007), La sfida della complessità, Feltrinelli, Milano 1985; Second Edition: Bruno Mondadori, Milano 2007
- Ceruti M (2006). Taches aveugles, écologies du changement, dynamiques d’auto-eco-organisation. Réflections sur l’histoire naturelle des possibilités en hommage à Heinz von Foerster. In: Andreewsky E, Delorme R (Eds), Seconde cybernétique et complexitè. Rencontres avec Heinz von Foerster. pp. 43–57, PARIS:L'Harmattan
- Ceruti M., Fornari G. (2005), Le due paci. Cristianesimo e morte di Dio nel mondo globalizzato, Raffaello Cortina Editore, Milano
- Bocchi G., Ceruti M. (2004), "Border Issue in the History of Europe", in Messina, P., (ed), Eu enlargement borders, boundaries and contraints, Policy Euronet Laboratory, pp. 23– 34, Cleup, Padova, 2004.
- Bocchi G., Ceruti M. (2004), Educazione e globalizzazione, Raffaello Cortina Editore, Milano, Preface by Edgar Morin
- Callari Galli M., Cambi F., Ceruti M. (2003), Formare alla complessità, Carocci, Roma
- Bocchi G., Ceruti M., Eds (2002), Le origini della scrittura. Genealogie di un'invenzione, Bruno Mondadori Editore, Milano 2002
- Bocchi G., Ceruti M., Eds (2001), Le radici prime dell'Europa. Gli intrecci genetici, linguistici, storici, Bruno Mondadori Editore, Milano
- Ceruti M. (2001). "La dimension narrative commune: sciences naturelles e sciences sociale." In: Prigogine I. (sous la direction de). L’homme devant l’incertain. p. 257-276, PARIS: Odile Jacob
- Ceruti M. (1999), "Complexity and the Unfinished Nature of Human Evolution". In Rossi, C., Tempos in science and nature: structures, relations and complexity, vol 879, pp. 63–68. New York Academy of Sciences, New York
- Ceruti M. (1999), "Narrative Elements. A New Common Feature Between the Sciences of Nature and the Sciences of Societies". In Review, 1, vol. XXII, pp. 1–14, Fernand Braudel Center for the Study of Economies, Historical Systems, and Civilizations, Binghamton, New York
- Ceruti M., Bocchi G. (1999), A complexitade do devir humano. In: Pena-Vega A, Pinheiro do Nascimento E (Eds), O pensar complexo, Edgar Morin e a crise da modernidade. pp. 141–164, RIO DE JANEIRO:Garamond, MinC/IPHAN/DEMU
- Ceruti M., Lo Verso G., Eds. (1998), Epistemologia e psicoterapia, Raffaello Cortina Editore, Milano
- Callari Galli M., Ceruti M., Pievani T. (1998) Pensare la diversità. Per un'educazione alla complessità umana, Meltemi, Roma
- Bocchi G., Ceruti M.(1998), "Biological Evolution and Cultural Evolution: toward a Planetary Consciousness". In Loye, D. (edited by), The Evolutionary Outrider. The Impact of the Human Agent on Evolution. Essays honouring Ervin Laszlo, pp. 151–164, Praeger Publishers, Westport
- Ceruti M (1995), Evoluzione senza fondamenti, Laterza, Roma-Bari 1995 (tr. in English: Evolution without Foundations, Hampton Press, Crosskill 2008)
- Ceruti M. (1995), "Philosophical Perspectives of QVI Cosmology". In Laszlo, E. (Eds), The Interconnected Universe. Conceptual Foundations of Trandisciplinary Unified Theory, pp. 119–124, World Scientific Publishing, Singapore; New Jersey, London; Hong Kong, 1995.
- Bocchi G., Ceruti M. (1994), Solidarietà o barbarie. L'Europa delle diversità contro la pulizia etnica, Raffaello Cortina Editore, Milano, Preface by Edgar Morin (tr. in English: Solidarity or Barbarism, Peter Lang, S. Francisco 1997, Preface by Edgar Morin)
- Fabbri P, Ceruti M., Giorello G., Preta L., Eds (1994), Il caso e la libertà, Laterza, Roma-Bari
- Ceruti M (1994). The ecology of planning. ERGONOMIA, vol. 2, pp. 32–36
- Ceruti M (1993). El fin de la eternidad. In: PRETA L (Ed), Imagenes y metaforas de la ciencia. p. 143-151, Madrid:Alianza Editorial
- Ceruti M (1993). Geschiedenis en vorm. Ecologie van het ontwerpen. In: Vertrekken vanuit een normale situatie..., pp. 63–80-163-174, Antwerpen:Museum van Hedendaagse Kunst Antwerpen
- Ceruti M, Ed (1992), Evoluzione e conoscenza, Edited, Lubrina, Bergamo
- Bocchi G., Ceruti M., Morin E. (1991), L'Europa nell'era planetaria, Sperling & Kupfer, Milano (tr. in French: Un nouveau commencement, Seuil, Paris 1991; tr. in Portuguese: Os problemas do fim de século, Editorial Notícias, Lisbona 1991; tr. in German: Einen neuen Anfang wagen: Überlegungen für das 21, Jahrhundert Junius, Hamburg 1992)
- Ceruti M (1991). Der Mythos der Allwissenheit und das Auge des Betrachters. In: Krieg P, Watzlawick P (Eds), Das Auge des Betrachters. Beiträge zum Konstruktivismus. p. 31-60, MÜNCHEN:Piper
- Morin E., Ceruti M., Bocchi G (1990), Turbare il futuro. Un nuovo inizio per la civiltà planetaria, Moretti & Vitali, Bergamo
- Ceruti M., Preta L., Eds (1990), Che cos'è la conoscenza, Roma-Bari
- Bocchi G, Ceruti M (1990). Le problème comologique de la modernité: de l’univers au plurivers. In: Bougnoux D, Le Moigne J-L, Proulx S (Eds), Colloque de Cerisy. Arguments pour une Méthode (autour d’Edgar Morin). p. 107-117, PARIS:Le Seuil
- Ceruti M. (1989), La danza che crea. Evoluzione e cognizione nell'epistemologia genetica, Feltrinelli, Milano, Preface by Francisco Varela (tr. in Spanish: A Dança que Cria, Instituto Piaget, Lisbona, 1995, Preface by Francisco Varela)
- Ceruti M., Lazlo E., Eds (1988), Physis: abitare la terra, Feltrinelli, Milano
- Morin E., Ceruti M., Eds (1988), Simplicité et complexité, Mondadori, Milano
- Ceruti M (1986), "International Conflicts and Equilibria". In World Encyclopedia of Peace, Section No A, Art. 240, Pergamon Press, Oxford, New York, Toronto, Sydney, Frankfurt
- Mounoud P., Fabbri Montesano D., Ceruti M., Munari A., Inhelder B. (1985), Dopo Piaget. Aspetti teorici e prospettive per l'educazione, Edizioni Lavoro, Roma
- Bocchi G., Ceruti M. (1984), Modi di pensare postdarwiniani. Saggio sul pluralismo evolutivo, with Gianluca Bocchi, Dedalo, Bari 1984
- Bocchi G., Ceruti M., Fabbri Montesano D., Munari A., Eds (1983), L'altro Piaget. Strategie delle genesi, Emme Edizioni, Milano
- Bocchi G., Ceruti M. (1981), Disordine e costruzione. Un'interpretazione epistemologica dell'opera di Jean Piaget, with Gianluca Bocchi, Feltrinelli, Milano 1981
