= Ludovico Geymonat =

Italian mathematician and philosopher (1908–1991)

Ludovico Geymonat (11 May 1908 – 29 November 1991) was an Italian mathematician, philosopher and historian of science. As a philosopher, he mainly dealt with philosophy of science, epistemology and Marxist philosophy, in which he gave an original turn to dialectical materialism.

== Biography ==
Born in Bobbio Pellice near Turin, where Geymonat attended Liceo classico Cavour, he graduated in Philosophy in 1930 and in Mathematics in 1932. Geymonat tried to break the wall between science and philosophy that characterised the idealistic culture fostered by Fascist intellectuals like Giovanni Gentile. In 1934 he went to Vienna, to delve into the neo-positivist philosophy of the Vienna Circle.

From 1940 he was an underground member of the Italian Communist Party and during the World War II he fought as a partisan, being together with Concetto Marchesi, one of the main PCI activists who did the most to find contacts with other anti-fascists to start a united front against the Axis. After the war, he became a communist assessor in Milan, between 1946 and 1949, when he obtained a chair of Theoretical philosophy at the University of Cagliari. Then he taught as professor of History of philosophy at the University of Pavia between 1952 and 1956, and as professor of philosophy of science in the University of Milan from 1956 to 1979.

Geymonat left the Italian Communist Party over disagreements with party's position on the Sino-Soviet split and became closer to Proletarian Democracy. Later he was a supporter of the Communist Refoundation Party founded when PCI turned into the Partito Democratico della Sinistra.

He died in Rho, Lombardy in 1991.

== Notable students ==
- Evandro Agazzi
- Mario Capanna
- Giulio Giorello
- Mario Vegetti

== Selected works ==
- Il problema della conoscenza nel positivismo, Bocca, Torino 1931
- La nuova filosofia della natura in Germania, Bocca, Torino 1934
- Studi per un nuovo razionalismo, Chiantore, Torino 1945
- Saggi di filosofia neorazionalistica, Einaudi, Torino 1953
- Galileo Galilei, Einaudi, Torino 1957, ISBN 88-06-04283-1
- Filosofia e filosofia della scienza, Feltrinelli, Milano 1960 ISBN 88-07-85054-0
- Filosofia e pedagogia nella storia della civiltà, with Renato Tisato, Garzanti, Milano 1965, 3 voll. ISBN 88-11-04320-4, 1965
- Attualità del materialismo dialettico, with Enrico Bellone, Giulio Giorello and Silvano Tagliagambe, Editori Riuniti, Roma 1974 ISBN 88-359-0626-1
- Scienza e realismo, Feltrinelli, Milano 1977 ISBN 88-07-65017-7
- Filosofia della probabilità, with Domenico Costantini, Feltrinelli, Milano 1982 ISBN 88-07-65023-1,
- Riflessioni critiche su Kuhn e Popper, Dedalo, Bari 1983 ISBN 88-220-3801-0
- Lineamenti di filosofia della scienza, Mondadori, Milano 1985, new edition by Utet, Torino 2006 ISBN 88-04-26971-5,
- Le ragioni della scienza, with Giulio Giorello and Fabio Minazzi, Laterza, Roma-Bari 1986 ISBN 88-420-2767-7,
- Storia del pensiero filosofico e scientifico, Garzanti, Milano 1970-1976, 7 voll. ISBN 88-11-25041-2,
- La libertà, Rusconi, Milano 1988 ISBN 88-18-01036-0
- La società come milizia, edited by Fabio Minazzi, Marcos y Marcos 1989 ISBN 88-7168-002-2, new edition La civiltà come milizia, edited by Fabio Minazzi, La Città del Sole, Napoli 2008
- I sentimenti, Rusconi, Milano 1989 ISBN 88-18-01055-7
- Filosofia, scienza e verità, with Evandro Agazzi and Fabio Minazzi, Rusconi, Milano 1989 ISBN 88-18-01057-3,
- La Vienna dei paradossi. Controversie filosofiche e scientifiche nel Wiener Kreis, edited by Mario Quaranta, il poligrafo, Padova 1991 ISBN 88-7115-017-1
- Dialoghi sulla pace e la libertà, with Fabio Minazzi, Cuen, Napoli 1992
- La ragione, with Fabio Minazzi and Carlo Sini, Piemme, Casale Monferrato 1994

== Sources ==
- Mario Quaranta (a cura di), Ludovico Geymonat filosofo della contraddizione, Sapere, Padova, 1980
- Corrado Mangione (a cura di), Scienza e filosofia. Saggi in onore di Ludovico Geymonat, Garzanti, Milano 1985
- Mirella Pasini, Daniele Rolando (a cura di), Il neoilluminismo italiano. Cronache di filosofia (1953-1962), Il Saggiatore, Milano 1991
- Fabio Minazzi, Scienza e filosofia in Italia negli anni Trenta: il contributo di Enrico Persico, Nicola Abbagnano e Ludovico Geymonat, in Il cono d'ombra. La crisi della cultura agli inizi del '900, Fabio Minazzi (edited by), Marcos y Marcos, Milano 1991, pp. 117–184
- Norberto Bobbio, Ricordo di Ludovico Geymonat, "Rivista di Filosofia", LXXXIV, 1, 1993
- Silvio Paolini Merlo, Consuntivo storico e filosofico sul "Centro di Studi Metodologici" di Torino (1940-1979), Pantograf (Cnr), Genova 1998
- Fabio Minazzi, La passione della ragione. Studi sul pensiero di Ludovico Geymonat, Thélema Edizioni-Accademia di architettura, Università della Svizzera italiana, Milano-Mendrisio 2001
- Mario Quaranta, Ludovico Geymonat. Una ragione inquieta, Seam, Formello 2001
- Fabio Minazzi (edited by), Filosofia, scienza e vita civile nel pensiero di Ludovico Geymonat, La Città del Sole, Napoli 2003
- Fabio Minazzi, Contestare e creare. La lezione epistemologico-civile di Ludovico Geymonat, La Città del Sole, Napoli 2004
- Silvio Paolini Merlo, Nuove prospettive sul "Centro di Studi Metodologici" di Torino, in «Bollettino della Società Filosofica Italiana», n. 182, maggio/agosto 2004
- Fabio Minazzi (a cura di), Ludovico Geymonat, un Maestro del Novecento. Il filosofo, il partigiano e il docente, Edizioni Unicopli, Milano 2009
- Pietro Rossi, Avventure e disavventure della filosofia. Saggi sul pensiero italiano del Novecento, il Mulino, Bologna, 2009
- Bruno Maiorca (a cura di), Ludovico Geymonat. Scritti sardi. Saggi, articoli e interviste, CUEC, Cagliari, 2008
- Fabio Minazzi, Ludovico Geymonat epistemologo, Mimesis Edizioni, Milano 2010
