= Minister of Tourism (Italy) =

Ministry in the Cabinet of Italy

- Ministro del Turismo
- Emblem of Italy

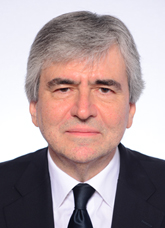
- Incumbent; Gianmarco Mazzi since 3 April 2026
- Department of Tourism
- Style: Ministro
- Member of: Council of Ministers
- Seat: Rome
- Appointer: President of Italy
- Term length: No fixed term
- Formation: August 29, 1959; 67 years ago
- First holder: Umberto Tupini
- Salary: $203,947.00
- Website: www.turismo.beniculturali.it

The minister of tourism (Italian: ministro del turismo), whose official name is Minister for the Coordination of Initiatives in the Tourism Sector, is one of the positions in the Italian government. The office, known as Minister of Tourism and Entertainment and established in 1959, was later abolished in 1993 after a referendum. It was re-established in 2009 under the fourth and final government of Silvio Berlusconi.

== List of ministers ==
Parties

- 1946–1994:
  - Christian Democracy
  - Italian Socialist Party
  - Italian Democratic Socialist Party
  - Italian Liberal Party
  - Independent
- 1994–present
  - The People of Freedom
  - Democratic Party
  - League
  - Brothers of Italy
  - Independent

Coalitions

- 1946–1994:
  - Centrist coalition
  - Organic centre-left
  - Pentapartito / Quadripartito
  - Mixed coalition
- 1994–present:
  - Centre-right coalition
  - Centre-left coalition
  - Mixed coalition

Portrait	Name (Born–Died)	Term of office			Party	Government	Ref.
Portrait	Name (Born–Died)	Took office	Left office	Time in office	Party	Government	Ref.
Minister of Tourism and Entertainment
	Umberto Tupini (1889–1973)	29 August 1959	26 July 1960	332 days	Christian Democracy	Segni II; Tambroni	
	Alberto Folchi (1897–1977)	26 July 1960	4 December 1963	3 years, 131 days	Christian Democracy	Fanfani III·IV; Leone I	
	Achille Corona (1914–1979)	4 December 1963	24 June 1968	4 years, 203 days	Italian Socialist Party	Moro I·II·III	
	Domenico Magrì (1903–1983)	24 June 1968	12 December 1968	171 days	Christian Democracy	Leone II	
	Lorenzo Natali (1922–1989)	12 December 1968	5 August 1969	236 days	Christian Democracy	Rumor I	
	Giovanni Battista Scaglia (1910–2006)	5 August 1969	27 March 1970	234 days	Christian Democracy	Rumor II	
	Giuseppe Lupis (1896–1979)	27 March 1970	6 August 1970	132 days	Italian Socialist Party	Rumor III	
	Matteo Matteotti (1912–2000)	6 August 1970	17 February 1972	1 year, 254 days	Italian Democratic Socialist Party	Colombo	
	Giovanni Battista Scaglia (1910–2006)	17 February 1972	26 June 1972	130 days	Christian Democracy	Andreotti I	
	Vittorio Badini Confalonieri (1914–1993)	26 June 1972	7 July 1973	1 year, 11 days	Italian Liberal Party	Andreotti II	
	Nicola Signorello (1926–2022)	7 July 1973	14 March 1974	250 days	Christian Democracy	Rumor IV	
	Camillo Ripamonti (1919–1997)	14 March 1974	23 November 1974	1 year, 254 days	Christian Democracy	Rumor V	
	Adolfo Sarti (1928–1992)	23 November 1974	29 July 1976	1 year, 249 days	Christian Democracy	Moro IV·V	
	Dario Antoniozzi (1923–2019)	29 July 1976	11 March 1978	1 year, 225 days	Christian Democracy	Andreotti III	
	Carlo Pastorino (1925–2011)	11 March 1978	20 March 1979	1 year, 9 days	Christian Democracy	Andreotti III	
	Egidio Ariosto (1911–1998)	20 March 1979	4 August 1979	137 days	Italian Democratic Socialist Party	Andreotti III	
	Bernardo D'Arezzo (1922–1985)	4 August 1979	18 October 1980	1 year, 75 days	Christian Democracy	Cossiga I	
	Bernardo D'Arezzo (1922–1985)	4 August 1979	18 October 1980	1 year, 75 days	Christian Democracy	Cossiga II	
	Nicola Signorello (1926–2022)	18 October 1980	14 August 1983	2 years, 300 days	Christian Democracy	Forlani	
	Nicola Signorello (1926–2022)	18 October 1980	14 August 1983	2 years, 300 days	Christian Democracy	Spadolini I·II; Fanfani V	
	Lelio Lagorio (1925–2017)	4 August 1983	1 August 1986	2 years, 362 days	Italian Socialist Party	Craxi I	
	Nicola Capria (1932–2009)	1 August 1986	18 April 1987	260 days	Italian Socialist Party	Craxi II	
	Mario Di Lazzaro (1932–2009)	18 April 1987	29 July 1987	102 days	Independent	Fanfani VI	
	Franco Carraro (1939–)	29 July 1987	6 February 1990	2 years, 192 days	Italian Socialist Party	Goria; De Mita; Andreotti VI	
	Carlo Tognoli (1938–2021)	6 February 1990	28 June 1992	2 years, 26 days	Italian Socialist Party	Andreotti VII	
	Margherita Boniver (1938–)	28 June 1992	28 April 1993	305 days	Italian Socialist Party	Amato I	
	Carlo Azeglio Ciampi (1920–2016) As Prime Minister	28 April 1993	11 May 1994	1 year, 13 days	Independent	Ciampi	
Office not in use		1994–2009				Berlusconi I	
Office not in use		1994–2009				Dini	
Office not in use		1994–2009				Prodi I D'Alema I·II; Amato II	
Office not in use		1994–2009				Berlusconi II·III	
Office not in use		1994–2009				Prodi II	
Office not in use		1994–2009				Berlusconi IV	
Minister of Tourism
	Michela Vittoria Brambilla (1967–)	8 May 2009	16 November 2011	2 years, 192 days	The People of Freedom	Berlusconi IV	
Minister of Tourism, Sport and Regional Affairs
	Piero Gnudi (1938–)	16 November 2011	28 April 2013	1 year, 163 days	Independent	Monti	
Minister of Cultural Heritage and Activities and Tourism
	Massimo Bray (1959– )	28 April 2013	22 February 2014	300 days	Democratic Party	Letta	
	Dario Franceschini (1958– )	22 February 2014	1 June 2018	4 years, 99 days	Democratic Party	Renzi; Gentiloni	
Minister of Agricultural, Food and Forestry Policies and Tourism
	Gian Marco Centinaio (1971– )	1 June 2018	5 September 2019	1 year, 96 days	League	Conte I	
Minister of Cultural Heritage and Activities and Tourism
	Dario Franceschini (1958– )	5 September 2019	13 February 2021	1 year, 161 days	Democratic Party	Conte II	
Minister of Tourism
	Massimo Garavaglia (1968–)	13 February 2021	22 October 2022	1 year, 251 days	League	Draghi	
	Daniela Santanchè (1961– )	22 October 2022	26 March 2026	3 years, 155 days	Brothers of Italy	Meloni	
	Giorgia Meloni (1977– ) As Prime Minister	26 March 2026	3 April 2026	8 days	Brothers of Italy	Meloni	
	Gianmarco Mazzi (1960– )	3 April 2026	Incumbent	163 days	Brothers of Italy	Meloni	
