= Chiara Braga =

Italian politician (born 1979)

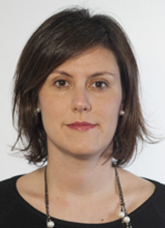
- Braga in 2018

Member of the Chamber of Deputies
- Incumbent
- Assumed office 29 April 2008
- Constituency: Lombardy 2

Personal details
- Born: 2 September 1979 (age 47) Como, Italy
- Party: Democratic Party (2007–present)
- Other political affiliations: Democrats of the Left (until 2007)
- Education: Polytechnic University of Milan

Chiara Braga (born 2 September 1979 in Como) is an Italian politician of the Democratic Party who has served in the Chamber of Deputies since 2008. She was first elected in the 2008 general election, and was re-elected in 2013, 2018 and 2022. Since 2023, she has served as group leader of the Democratic Party in the chamber.
