= Gian Carlo Abelli =

Italian politician (1941–2016)

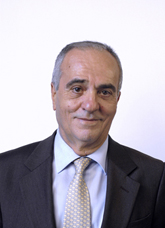
Gian Carlo Abelli

Gian Carlo Abelli (11 May 1941 – 24 January 2016) was an Italian politician.

Born in Broni, he was a long-time Christian Democrat. He became leader of Forza Italia's group in the regional assembly of Lombardy in 2005. In the 2008 general election he was elected to the Chamber of Deputies, where he sat in the group of The People of Freedom.

== Political career ==
Abelli started his political career in the 1970s as part of the Christian Democratic Party of Lombardy. In 1974 he became the president of the San Matteo Policlinic in Pavia.

In the 90s, after the break-up of the Christian Democratic Party, Abelli joined Forza Italia and became close with the Communion and Liberation movement and with Roberto Formigoni, who entrusted him with running the regional healthcare as President of the Healthcare Commission of the Lombardy Region. Between 1996 and 1997 Abelli received a bribe of 72 million lire from Giuseppe Poggi Longostrevi who was later involved in the main scandal of corruption of Lombard healthcare.

Abelli was the head of Forza Italia regional council in Lombardy from 2005. He was also the commissioner of the regional Family and Social Solidarity, though he was mainly connected with the healthcare system and Communion and Liberation. In his regional political role, Abelli was a great sponsor of the Broni-Pavia-Mortara autostrada project which was launched in 2002 and which raised objections from local committees and associations.

In the 2008 Italian general election Abelli was elected to the Chamber of Deputies in the People of Freedom group. He was the third candidate on the Lombardia 1 electoral college list, directly following Berlusconi and Fini. In August 2008 Berlusconi nominated Abelli commissioner of the South Tyrol section of Forza Italia to take the party to provincial elections.

== Private life and legal incidents ==
Abelli was married to Rosanna Gariboldi (Lady Abelli) who was the councillor of Internal Organisation in the Pavia province.

Gariboldi was the business partner of Massimo Ponzoni, who was regional councillor for the Environment, Massimo Buscemi, who was regional councillor for Network and Utility Services, and Giorgio Pozzi, the ex-councillor for Innovation and Craftsmanship. Together, these four held the majority of the Lux ad Sidera society, which was involved in property speculation in the province of Varese on land sold by Canossian nuns.

In October 2009 Gariboldi was arrested and detained in the San Vittore Prison of Milan together with the businessman Giuseppe Grossi, in the context of investigating black market funds created from the reclamation of the Milano Santa Giulia area. On the account marked "Associates", opened by Gariboldi at the Bank J. Safra Sarasin in Montecarlo, and for which Abelli also acted as attorney, almost 2.4 million euro had been transferred by Grossi and his fiduciaries. These were then in part returned with further transfers to Swiss banks. On other accounts owned by the couple in Montecarlo other deposits of hundreds of thousands of euro showed up, their origins uncertain. On 12 January 2010 Gariboldi negotiated two years of imprisonment with a suspended sentence and she was let out of San Vittore prison after three months of detention and agreed to pay 1.2 million euro, which came from the laundering the ex-commissioner was accused of.

After a long illness, Gian Carlo Abelli died in Broni on 24 January 2016 at the age of 74.
