= Giulio Giorello =

Italian philosopher (1945–2020)

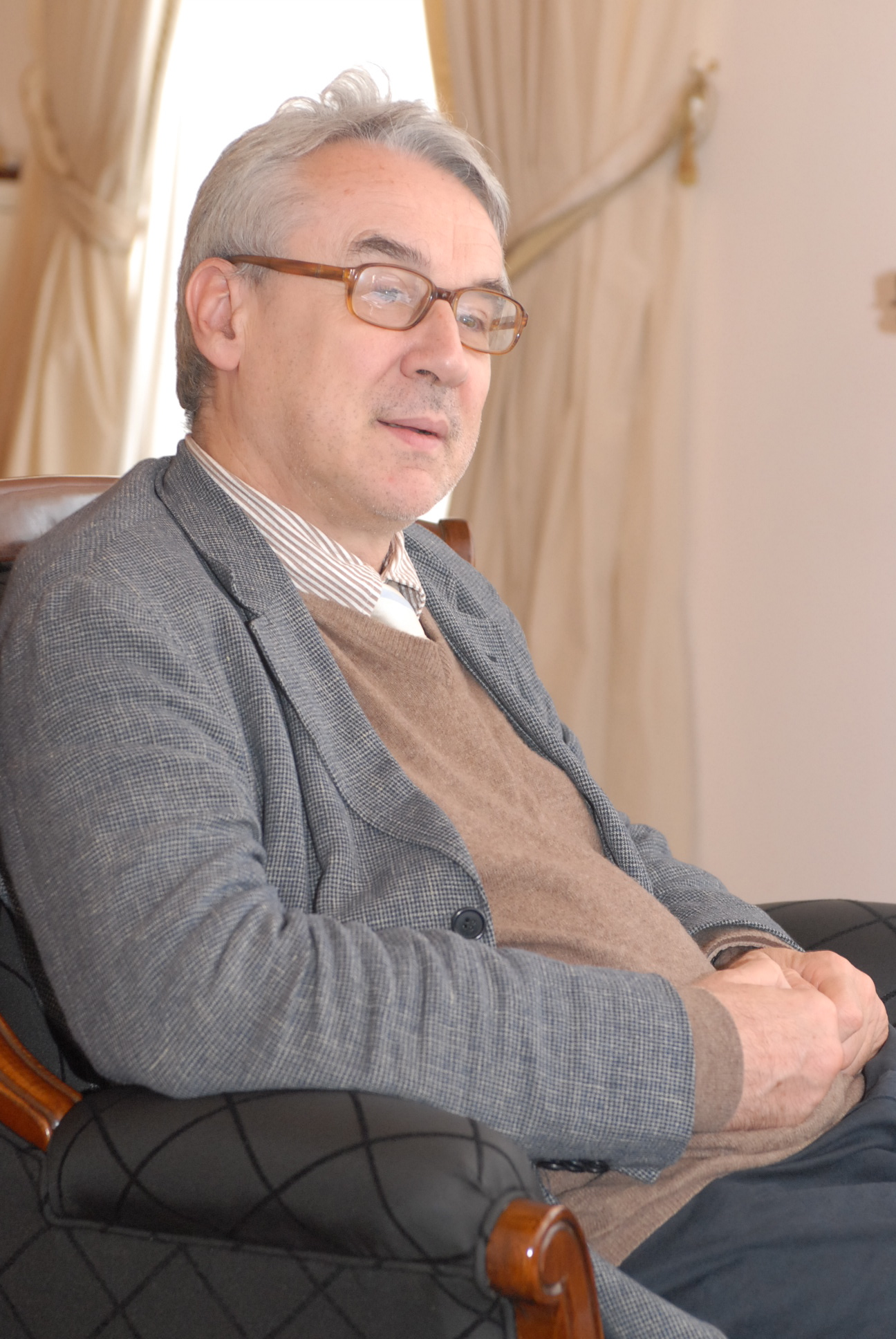
- Giorello in 2008
- Born: 14 May 1945; Milan, Italy
- Died: 15 June 2020 (aged 75); Milan, Italy
- Education: University of Milan
- Spouse: Roberta Pelachin (m. 2020)
- Scientific career
- Fields: Physics; Science; Philosophy; Epistemology; Mathematics

Giulio Giorello (Italian: [ˈdʒuːljo dʒoˈrɛllo]; 14 May 1945 – 15 June 2020) was an Italian philosopher, mathematician, and epistemologist.

== Biography ==
Giorello graduated with a degree in philosophy in 1968 and in mathematics in 1971 at the University of Milan. While there, he studied under the philosopher Ludovico Geymonat. He then taught physics and natural sciences at the University of Pavia, University of Catania, University of Insubria and the University of Milan. Giorello was a professor of philosophy of science at the University of Milan; he was also President of SILFS (Italian Society of Logic and Philosophy of Science). He directed the "Scienza e idee" series by Raffaello Cortina Editore and collaborated on the cultural pages of the newspaper Corriere della Sera.

In 2010, Giorello expressed his atheistic thought with work Senza Dio. Del buon uso dell'ateismo, but in the last years of his life he expressed an agnostic thought.

In March 2012 he was a speaker at the national congress of the Grand Orient of Italy in Rimini. Giorello won the 4th edition of the 2012 Frascati Philosophy National Award.

Giorello died in Milan on 15 June 2020 due to COVID-19 during the COVID-19 pandemic in Italy. Three days before his death, he married his partner Roberta Pelachin.

== Personal life ==
Giorello was a "comic book expert"; he wrote essays about Tex Willer and Topolino, and he also wrote the prefaces to Logicomix and Rat-Man: Superstorie di un supernessuno. In 2014, he co-created the comic "The philosophy of Donald Duck".

== Works ==
- Saggi di storia della matematica, Milan, FER, 1974.
- Il pensiero matematico e l'infinito, Milan, UNICOPLI, 1982. ISBN 88-7061-160-4.
- Lo spettro e il libertino. Teologia, matematica, libero pensiero, Milan, A. Mondadori, 1985.
- Le ragioni della scienza, with Ludovico Geymonat and Fabio Minazzi, Rome-Bari, Laterza, 1986. ISBN 88-420-2767-7.
- Filosofia della scienza, Milan, Jaca Book, 1992. ISBN 88-16-43034-6.
- Le stanze della ricerca, Milan, Mazzotta, 1992. ISBN 88-202-1057-6.
- Europa universitas. Tre saggi sull'impresa scientifica europea, with Tullio Regge and Salvatore Veca, Milan, Feltrinelli, 1993. ISBN 88-07-09038-4.
- Introduzione alla filosofia della scienza, Milan, R.C.S. libri & grandi opere, 1994. ISBN 88-452-2128-8.
- Quale Dio per la sinistra? Note su democrazia e violenza, with Pietro Adamo, Milan, UNICOPLI, 1994. ISBN 88-400-0342-8.
- La filosofia della scienza nel XX secolo, with Donald Gillies, Rome-Bari, Laterza, 1995. ISBN 88-420-4492-X
- Lo specchio del reame. Riflessioni su potere e comunicazione, with Roberto Esposito, Carlo Sini and Danilo Zolo, Ravenna, Longo, 1997. ISBN 88-8063-113-6.
- Epistemologia applicata. Percorsi filosofici, with Michele Di Francesco, Milan, CUEM, 1999. ISBN 88-6001-645-2.
- I volti del tempo, with Elio Sindoni, Corrado Sinigaglia, Milan, Bompiani, 2001. ISBN 88-452-4973-5.
- Prometeo, Ulisse, Gilgameš. Figure del mito, Milan, Raffaello Cortina Editore, 2004. ISBN 88-7078-878-4.
- Di nessuna chiesa. La libertà del laico, Milan, Raffaello Cortina Editore, 2005. ISBN 88-7078-975-6.
- Dove fede e ragione si incontrano?, with Bruno Forte, Cinisello Balsamo, San Paolo, 2006. ISBN 88-215-5720-0.
- La libertà della vita, with Umberto Veronesi, Milan, Raffaello Cortina Editore, 2006. ISBN 88-6030-071-1.
- Il decalogo. I dieci comandamenti commentati dai filosofi, II, Non nominare il nome di Dio invano, with Gabriele Mandel, with CD, Milan, Albo Versorio, 2007. ISBN 978-88-89130-26-1.
- La scienza tra le nuvole. Da Pippo Newton a Mr Fantastic, with Pier Luigi Gaspa, Milan, Raffaello Cortina Editore, 2007. ISBN 978-88-6030-125-3.
- Libertà. Un manifesto per credenti e non credenti, with Dario Antiseri, Milan, Bompiani, 2008. ISBN 978-88-452-6176-3.
