= Bruno Marton =

Italian politician (born 1969)

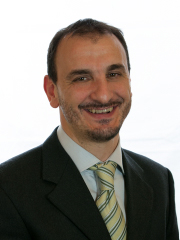
- Marton in 2013

Member of the Senate
- Incumbent
- Assumed office 13 October 2022
- Constituency: Lombardy – P01
- In office 15 March 2013 – 22 March 2018
- Constituency: Lombardy

Personal details
- Born: 28 September 1969 (age 56)
- Party: Five Star Movement (since 2009)

Bruno Marton (born 28 September 1969) is an Italian politician. He has been a member of the Senate since 2022, having previously served from 2013 to 2018. From April to July 2015, he served as group leader of the Five Star Movement.

== Biography ==
In 2009, he joined the newly formed Five Star Movement(M5S) led by Beppe Grillo and Gianroberto Casaleggio. In the 2010 regional elections in Lombardy, he ran for the regional council in support of the Vito Crimi motion, which was included in the regional electoral district, and received 66 votes in the Province of Monza and Brianza district, but was not elected.

In the 2013 general election, he ran for the Senate of the Republic (Italy), appearing seventh on the M5S lists in the Lombardy constituency, and was elected to the Senate. During the 17th Legislature of the Republic, he served on the 4th Defense Committee, where he was the Five Star Movement’s group leader, as well as on the 6th Finance and Treasury Committee and the Parliamentary Committee for the Security of the Republic (COPASIR), undertaking numerous missions abroad, including to the United States,Canada,Finland,Estonia, Germany, South Africa, and Belgium, to examine how these nations exercise oversight over their intelligence agencies.

As a member of COPASIR, he has participated in meetings with the directors of U.S. intelligence agencies (CIA, FBI, NSA, ODNI, DIA) and members of the United States Congress, where he has repeatedly served as a presenter on the intelligence services’ semiannual report, the sector’s budget, and government actions related to intelligence.

He has focused primarily on cybersecurity and the Computer security, and has made numerous contributions on specific topics.

In the 2018 general election, he ran again for the Senate as a candidate for the M5S, both in the single-member district of Lombardy - 07 (Sesto San Giovanni)—where he received 26.76% of the vote but was defeated by center-right candidate Paolo Romani (41.13%)—and in the multi-member district of Lombardy - 04, where he finished in fourth place but was not elected. He subsequently served on Vito Crimi staff during the Conte administrations, first as his private Secretary of the Council of Ministers (Italy) with responsibility for information and publishing, and later as Deputy minister of the Interior.

In the 2022 early general election, he ran again for the Senate as a candidate for the Five Star Movement, both in the single-member district of Lombardy - 06 (Monza) and as the lead candidate in the multi-member district of Lombardy - 01. In the single-member district, he received 7.76% of the vote and was defeated by center-right candidate Silvio Berlusconi (50.26%), while in the multi-member district he was re-elected to the Palazzo Madama, Rome. During the 19th Legislature, he served on the 3rd Committee on Foreign Affairs and Defense.
