= Silvana Comaroli =

Italian politician (born 1967)

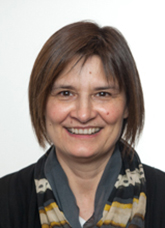
- Comaroli in 2018

Member of the Chamber of Deputies
- Incumbent
- Assumed office 23 March 2018
- Constituency: Lombardy 4 – U04 (2018–2022); Lombardy 4 – U03 (2022–present)
- In office 22 April 2008 – 14 March 2013
- Constituency: Lombardy 2

Member of the Senate
- In office 5 March 2013 – 22 March 2018
- Constituency: Lombardy

Personal details
- Born: 27 March 1967 (age 59)
- Party: Lega

Silvana Andreina Comaroli (born 27 March 1967) is an Italian politician. She has been a member of the Chamber of Deputies since 2018, having previously served from 2008 to 2013. From 2013 to 2018, she was a member of the Senate.
