= Emilia De Biasi =

Italian politician (1958–2021)

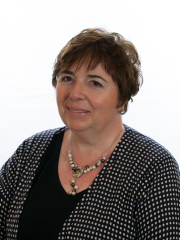
- in 2013
- Born: 6 February 1958; San Severo
- Died: 5 January 2021 (aged 62); Milan
- Occupation: Party manager
- Political party: Democratic Party

Emilia Grazia De Biasi (6 February 1958 – 5 January 2021) was an Italian politician and senator.

== Life ==
Biasi was born in San Severo in 1958 and went to high school.

She was elected as a deputy in 2006 and again in 2008.

On 24 February 2013 she was elected as a senator. She took her seat and she was the President of the senate's standing committee on Hygiene and Health until 2018. In 2016 she was given an award by the Gimbe Foundation.

Biasi died in Milan in 2021.

Later that year her husband, Guglielmo Bruni, and others published a book "'Passion and dialogue', the memory of Emilia De Biasi".
