= Carlo Sini =

Italian philosopher

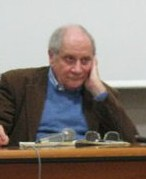
- Born: 6 December 1933; Bologna, Kingdom of Italy

Education
- Education: University of Milan (Laurea, 1960)

Philosophical work
- Era: Contemporary philosophy
- Region: Western philosophy
- School: Continental philosophy Phenomenology; Hermeneutics
- Main interests: Pragmatism; Philosophy of language
- Notable ideas: Pensiero delle pratiche (thought of practices)

Carlo Sini (Bologna, 6 December 1933) is an Italian philosopher and one of the leading figures in contemporary Italian philosophy, mainly known for his studies about language and hermeneutics, following the work of Charles Sanders Peirce.

== Biography ==
Carlo Sini studied at University of Milan with Enzo Paci. In 1976 he became professor of Theoretical Philosophy at University of Milan.

He is member of Accademia dei Lincei from 1994 and of the Institut International de Philosophie.

He has been a member of the national directive of the Italian Philosophical Society.

== Thought ==
Sini's thought proposes an interpretation of the work of Charles Sanders Peirce that converges towards the thought of Heidegger and phenomenology.

The essential topic in Peirce's semiotics is not the sign (as in Husserl, Heidegger, Derrida) but the sign relation. For example: Sign, Object, Interpretant, taken in an inextricable correlation (each one is for the other two). Therefore, this perspective doesn’t show that there are things and among these things there are signs (road signs, military trumpet signals, etc., as described by De Saussure). It rather shows that, as a result of sign relations, there are things, defined by the concrete interpretative habit (semiosis and hermeneutics are one: it follows that any “ontology” becomes mere superstition).

He has consequently developed a so-called "thought of practices" as a way to "recognize the errance of every image of truth":

The thought of practices reminds us that everyone actually puts the knowledge they have into practice, scientific and non-scientific, based on their belonging to the world (to their world), as everyone is a movable origin and limit. The knowledge of praxis, of common, everyday operations, thus constitutes that life of truth.

Sini has openly declared to be atheist.

== Publications in English ==
- Carlo Sini (1993). Images of Truth: From Sign to Symbol. Humanities Press.
- Carlo Sini (2009). Etichs of Writing. State University of New York Press.
