= Roberto Mura =

Italian politician and businessman

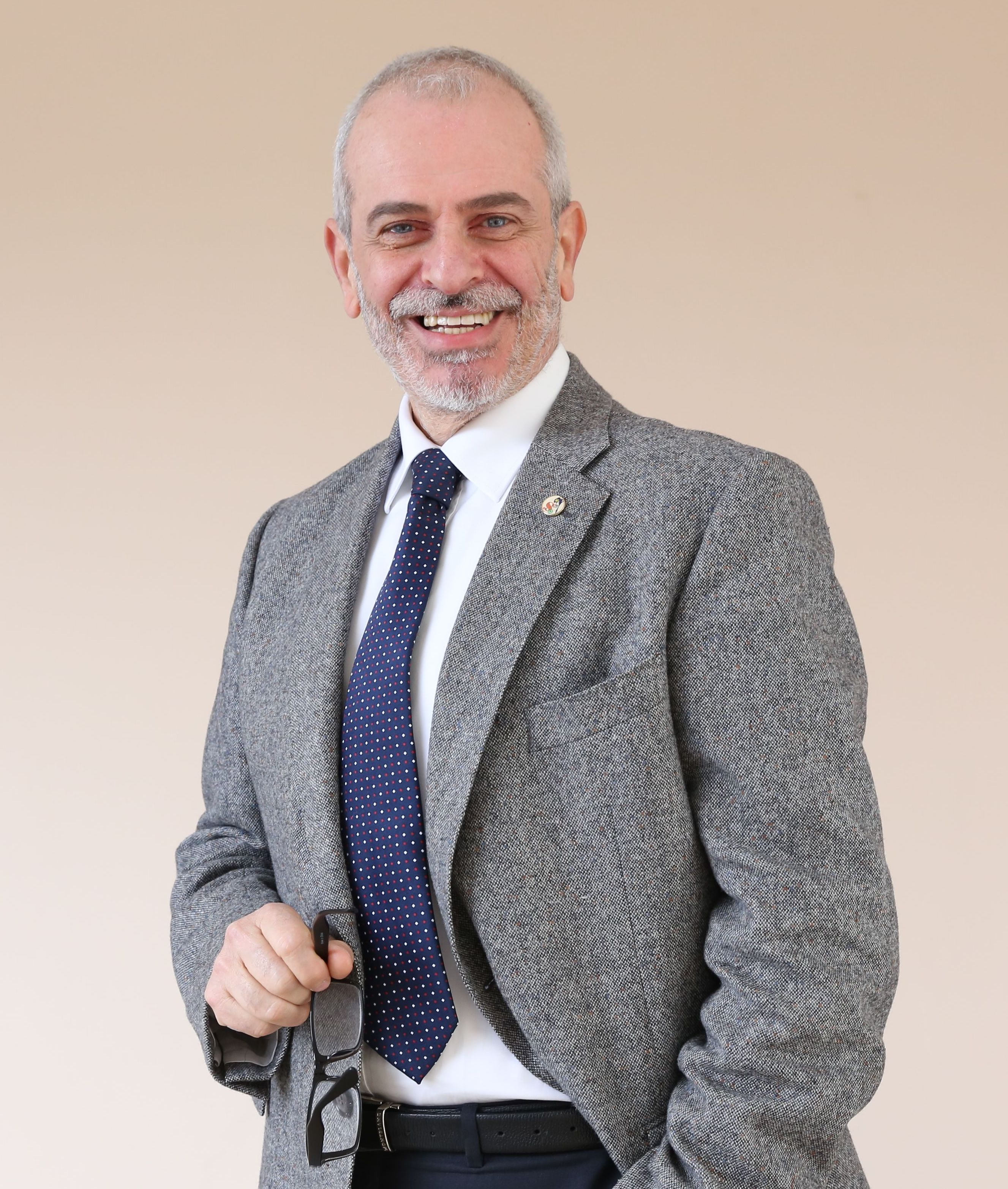

Roberto Mura (born 5 June 1955 in Pavia, Italy) is an Italian politician and businessman.

Mura was Senator for the Northern League from 2008 to 2013; he has been a member of the Senate Defense Commission from 22 May 2008 to 30 January 2009, member of the Public Works and Communications Commission from 22 May 2008 to 17 November 2011 to replace the Deputy Minister for Infrastructure and Transport Roberto Castelli, member of the Finance and Treasury Committee from 30 January 2009 to 10 January 2012 and member of the Justice Commission from 11 January 2012. Mura was also a member of the Parliamentary Election and Immunity Committee and the Parliamentary Committee for prosecution proceedings, a member of the RAI Supervisory Commission and a substitute member of the Commission for the supervision of the Deposit and Loan Fund.
