= Irene Aderenti =

Italian politician (1955–2025)

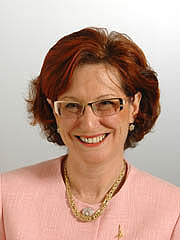
- Aderenti in 2008

Member of the Senate of the Republic of Italy for Lombardy
- In office 29 April 2008 – 14 March 2013

Personal details
- Born: 21 February 1955 Zurich, Switzerland
- Died: 14 April 2025 (aged 70) Castiglione delle Stiviere, Italy
- Party: LN (until 2019)
- Occupation: Schoolteacher

Irene Aderenti (21 February 1955 – 14 April 2025) was an Italian politician. A member of the Lega Nord, she served in the Senate of the Republic from 2008 to 2013.

== Early life and education ==
Irene Aderenti was born in Zurich to parents from Brescia who had emigrated to Switzerland. She later returned with her family to their hometown, where she attended a teacher training institute. After graduating, she began teaching in elementary schools in Brescia, Cavriana, and Castiglione delle Stiviere, where she eventually settled permanently.

== Political career ==
In 2008, she was included in the electoral list for the Senate of the Republic representing Lega Nord in Lombardy, occupying the twelfth position. She was elected thanks to Roberto Castelli, second on the list, opting for election in the Liguria regional constituency. During her parliamentary activity, she focused particularly on education, aligning with her professional background. She was a member of the 7th Standing Committee (Public Education, Cultural Heritage) and the Parliamentary Committee for Childhood. Among her proposals were the establishment of "bridge classes" for foreign minors with limited knowledge of Italian and making the middle school exam mandatory for foreign students seeking admission to high schools.

Not re-elected in 2013, she continued her political activity locally, particularly organizing protests against the redistribution of asylum seekers in the municipalities of Alto Mantovano.

In 2014, she ran in the 2014 European Parliament election in the northwestern constituency, garnering 4,193 votes, insufficient for election as an MEP.

A long-time critic of the Five Star Movement and Beppe Grillo, she announced her departure from Lega Nord after the 2018 Pontida rally, disagreeing with the government pact signed by leader Matteo Salvini. In 2019, she launched a new movement called "Objective Autonomy."

== Death ==
Aderenti died in Castiglione delle Stiviere, Italy on 14 April 2025, at the age of 70.
