= 2019 European Parliament election in Friuli-Venezia Giulia =

The 2019 European Parliament election in Italy took place in Italy on 26 May 2019.

In Friuli-Venezia Giulia Lega Nord came first with 42.6% of the vote (country-level result 34.3%) and more than 20pp than the Democratic Party, which came second with 22.2%. The Five Star Movement came third with 9.6%, ahead of Brothers of Italy (7.6%), Forza Italia (6.7%), More Europe (3.0%), Green Europe (3.0%) and The Left (1.6%). The South Tyrolean People's Party, which included one candidate from the Slovene Union, reached 38.9% in San Floriano del Collio.

== Results ==
| Party | Votes | % |
|---|---|---|
| Lega Nord | 245,636 | 42.6 |
| Democratic Party | 128,302 | 22.2 |
| Five Star Movement | 55,529 | 9.6 |
| Brothers of Italy | 43,898 | 7.6 |
| Forza Italia | 38,593 | 6.7 |
| More Europe | 17,333 | 3.0 |
| Green Europe | 17,177 | 3.0 |
| The Left | 9,428 | 1.6 |
| others | 21,296 | 3.7 |
| Total | 577,192 | 100.00 |

Source: Ministry of the Interior
