= Gerardo D'Ambrosio =

Italian magistrate and politician

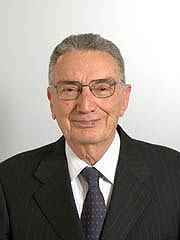
- Born: 29 November 1930; Santa Maria a Vico
- Died: 30 March 2014 (aged 83); Milan

Gerardo D'Ambrosio (29 November 1930 – 30 March 2014) was an Italian magistrate and politician.

Born in Santa Maria a Vico, Caserta, D'Ambrosio graduated in law in Naples in 1952. In 1957 he was assigned to the Public Prosecutor at the Court of Nola, then he was transferred to the Court of Voghera, and finally in Milan; there D'Ambrosio conducted the criminal investigation of the Piazza Fontana bombing, and was prosecutor in the Banco Ambrosiano trial, among other things. In 1989, he was chosen to direct the department against organized crime and since 1991 he directed the special department covering the crimes against the public administration. In 1992 he entered the mani pulite pool of magistrates which gave him a large notoriety.

From 1999, he was the head of the Public Prosecutor's Office until his retirement in 2002. He was later senator for two terms, with the Democrats of the Left and then with the Democratic Party. He died of cardiorespiratory failure.

== Links ==
- Piazza Fontana bombing
