= Renzo Rabellino =

Italian politician

Personal details
- Born: September 12, 1958 (age 67) Turin, Italy

Renzo Rabellino (born in Turin on September 12, 1958) is the leader of the No Euro Movement, a political party in Italy that advocates the return of the Italian lira for the Italian currency and government control of the central bank.

Elected in 1990 in the regional council of Piedmont with the Northern League, he left the party in 1993 to found the League for Piedmont (Lega per il Piemonte). In 1994 the party changed its name into Piemont Nation (Piemonte Nazione).

Renzo Rabellino is known for being the inventor of many "owl lists" (liste civetta), namely phony parties with names and symbols similar to the bigger parties and with candidates homonymous of the most famous politicians.

In the 2006 italian general election, Rabellino ran with his party No Euro into the House of Freedoms, receiving less than 0.1% of the popular vote.

In the 2009 provincial elections, Renzo Rabellino, who was a joint-candidate of several small parties, won 3.5% of the vote and he was elected to the Provincial Council of Turin with the Piedmont Padanian League.

In 2012, the Turin Tribunal condemned Rabellino for two years and ten months of imprisonment for the irregularities about the presentation of six lists in the 2010 regional elections in Piedmont.

== See also ==
- Italian general election, 2006
- No Euro Movement
- House of Freedoms
