= No Euro Movement =

No Euro Movement Movimento No Euro
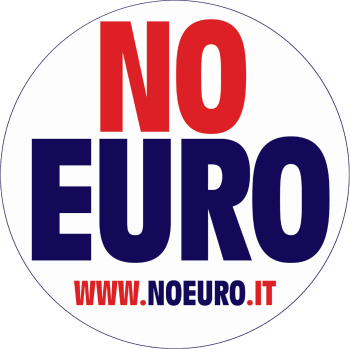
- Leader: Renzo Rabellino
- Founded: 28 October 2003
- Headquarters: Via San Donato, 55 Turin
- Ideology: Hard Euroscepticism; Populism; Conservatism
- National affiliation: House of Freedoms (2006); Christian Front (since 2014)

Website
- http://www.noeuro.it

The No Euro Movement (Movimento No Euro) is a small political party that aims to remove the euro as the Italian currency, returning to the Italian lira, and advocates governmental control of the Italian Central Bank. Renzo Rabellino was elected as secretary of the party on 2 October 2005 held in Milan.

No Euro is essentially a party that is against banks, that wants to abolish the seigneurage crime and to bring back to citizens the property of the money, now belonging to central banks that are private.

On 5 April 2014, No Euro, together Golden Dawn, Venetian secessionists and other small political formations, founded in Parma the Christian Front (Fronte Cristiano), with the objective of defending Christian roots against globalization and the globalist project.
