= Fiorenza Bassoli =

Italian politician (1948–2020)

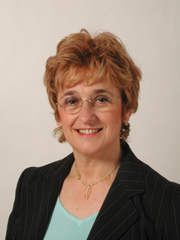
- Fiorenza Bassoli

Senator of the Republic
- In office 26 April 2008 – 14 March 2013

Member of the Regional Council of Lombardy
- In office 1995–2005

Mayor of Sesto San Giovanni
- In office 13 May 1985 – 12 June 1994
- Preceded by: Libero Biagi
- Succeeded by: Filippo Penati

Personal details
- Born: 9 August 1948 Reggiolo
- Died: 5 July 2020 (aged 71) Milan
- Party: PD
- Other political affiliations: PCI; PDS; DS

Fiorenza Bassoli (9 August 1948 – 5 July 2020) was an Italian politician.

Bassoli was born in Reggiolo on 9 August 1948. She began her political career affiliated with the Italian Communist Party, and later joined its successors the Democratic Party of the Left, Democrats of the Left and the Democratic Party. She was a member of the council of Sesto San Giovanni, then served as the first woman mayor of the comune between 1985 and 1994, succeeding Libero Biagi. Bassoli was subsequently elected to the Regional Council of Lombardy, in office from 1995 to 2005. She then served in the Senate from 2006 to 2013.

Bassoli died in Milan on 5 July 2020, aged 71.
