= Giacomo Caliendo =

Italian politician (1942–2025)

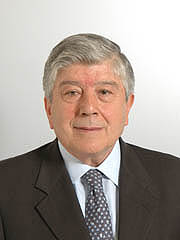
- Caliendo in 2008

Undersecretary at the Ministry of Justice
- In office 12 May 2008 – 16 November 2011

Personal details
- Born: 28 August 1942 Saviano, Italy
- Died: 30 March 2025 (aged 82) Milan, Italy
- Party: Forza Italia

Giacomo Caliendo (28 August 1942 – 30 March 2025) was an Italian magistrate and politician.

== Life and career ==
Born in Saviano, Caliendo graduated in law from the University of Naples Federico II and served as judge at the Court of Milan and later Deputy Attorney General at the Milan Public Prosecutor's Office. Between 1976 and 1981, he was a member of the Superior Council of Judicature.

Between 2008 and 2022, Caliendo served three terms as a senator; he also served as Undersecretary at the Ministry of Justice during the fourth Berlusconi government.

Caliendo died in Milan on 30 March 2025, at the age of 82.
