= Daniela Santanchè =

Italian entrepreneur and politician (born 1961)

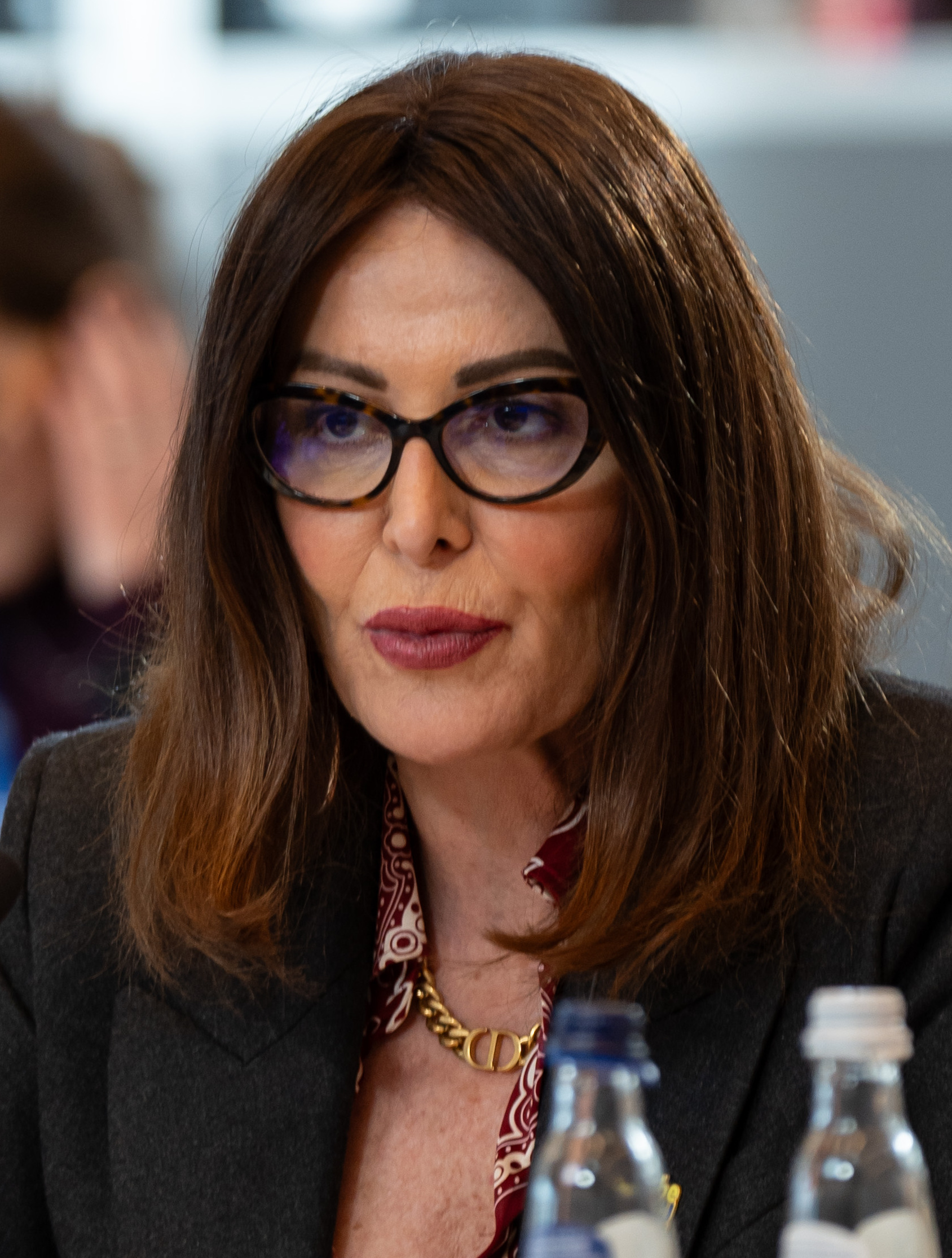
- Santanchè in 2024

Minister of Tourism
- In office 22 October 2022 – 26 March 2026
- Prime Minister: Giorgia Meloni
- Preceded by: Massimo Garavaglia
- Succeeded by: Gianmarco Mazzi

Member of the Senate of the Republic
- Incumbent
- Assumed office 23 March 2018
- Constituency: Cremona

Member of the Chamber of Deputies
- In office 15 March 2013 – 22 March 2018
- Constituency: Lombardy
- In office 11 July 2001 – 28 April 2008
- Constituency: Lombardy

Personal details
- Born: Daniela Garnero; 7 April 1961 (age 65) Cuneo, Italy
- Party: FdI (since 2017)
- Other political affiliations: AN (1995–2007); LD (2007–2008); MpI (2008–2009); PdL (2009–2013); FI (2013–2017)
- Spouse: Paolo Santanchè (m. 1982; ann. 1995)
- Children: 1
- Education: University of Turin
- Profession: Entrepreneur

Daniela Garnero (born 7 April 1961), commonly known by her former married name as Daniela Santanchè (Italian pronunciation: [daˈnjɛːla santaŋˈkɛ]), is an Italian politician. Between 2010 and 2011 she served as Undersecretary to the Ministry for the Implementation of the Government Program in the Berlusconi IV Cabinet. She is currently the regional coordinator of Brothers of Italy in Lombardy and served as the Minister of Tourism in the Meloni Cabinet from 2022 to 2026.

== Biography ==
=== Studies and personal life ===
Daniela Garnero was born in Cuneo, Piedmont, Italy. She moved to Turin to study political science, and at 21 married Paolo Santanchè, a plastic surgeon. She was employed by his company in an administrative role. After studying political science, in 1983 she founded a company that focused on marketing. She later acquired shares of the Billionaire company, along with Flavio Briatore, Lele Mora, Paolo Brosio and Marcello Lippi.

In 1995, she left her husband, Paolo Santanchè, and began a relationship with Canio Mazzaro, a pharmaceutical entrepreneur from Potenza. Her marriage to Paolo Santanchè was declared void by the Roman Rota. In politics she has continued to use the Santanchè surname, despite an unsuccessful court case by her ex-husband to try to stop her. Her current partner is Dimitri Kunz d'Asburgo Lorena.

=== Local politics with National Alliance ===
In the 1990s, Santanchè became an assistant of Ignazio La Russa, and in 1995 joined the right-wing National Alliance. Santanchè worked as a consultant for the Milan Municipality Board led by Gabriele Albertini, and in June 1999 was elected councillor of the Council of the Province of Milan.

In 2001, Santanchè unsuccessfully ran for a seat in the Italian Chamber of Deputies, but instead took up a seat vacated by her colleague Viviana Beccalossi. From 2003 to June 2004, Santanchè served as assessor of the Municipality of Ragalna, a town in the province of Catania, dealing with sports and events.

=== National politics with National Alliance ===
Santanchè held the position of chief of the department for equal opportunity for the National Alliance from 2005 to 2007. In 2005, Santanchè was harshly criticised when she showed her middle finger, in a gesture of insult, towards a student protest against the Moratti school reform. Moreover, in 2005, Santanchè was nominated to hold the discussion of the annual Financial Law, the first woman in Italian history in such a role. In 2006, she was re-elected to the Italian Chamber of Deputies with National Alliance in the constituency of Milan.

=== The Right and Movement for Italy ===
More than a year later, on 10 November 2007, Daniela Santanchè resigned from the National Alliance party to join Francesco Storace's new party The Right. The same day, she was appointed official speaker for the party Santanchè was then the Prime Minister candidate for The Right in the 2008 Italian general election. Along with Flavia D'Angeli (Critical Left) and Fabiana Stefanoni (Communist Alternative Party), she was the first woman to be a candidate for Italian prime minister.

The Right did not acquire the necessary share of votes (4% for the Chamber, 8% for the Senate) to enter the Parliament and Daniela Santanchè therefore ended her parliamentary mandate. After seven years as deputy, she received €65,534 as termination indemnities (trattamento di fine rapporto), and €3,605 monthly as lifetime allowance. She declared that she will donate this to charity.

On 28 September 2008, after arguing with party secretary Francesco Storace, Santanchè left the party. Shortly afterwards, with Diego Zarneri and other former La Destra politicians, she founded the Movement for Italy (MpI) political movement, in order to come closer to Silvio Berlusconi's People of Freedom.

=== Brothers of Italy ===
On 3 December 2017, Santanchè joined Brothers of Italy (FdI) and attended the party congress in Trieste. During the 2018 Italian general election she was elected as a Senator in the Cremona constituency, and was re-elected in 2022 with 52.17% of the votes.

On 22 October 2022, she was sworn in as the Minister of Tourism in the government of Giorgia Meloni.

On 25 March 2026, she officially announced her resignation from the position of Minister of Tourism, following an explicit request from Prime Minister Giorgia Meloni.

== Controversies ==
=== Positions on the Islamic veil and alleged assaults ===
On 22 October 2006, while she was participating in a live show, Controcorrente, to discuss matters regarding the Islamic veil, Santanchè was criticized by the Imam of Segrate. The prefect of Milan stated that her safety was at risk and he would consider the possibility of taking security measures to protect her.

On 20 September 2009, she appeared with Diego Zarneri at the Eid al-Fitr religious holiday in Milan. According to Muslims, Santanchè tried to unveil some women, causing a reaction by local men. In her version, Santanchè said she had asked the police to intervene, alleging that Italian law bans appearing in public with a veil, and that she had made no contact with any Muslim woman. Afterwards, she declared she had been assaulted and beaten, but this was denied by Muslim eyewitnesses. At the hospital, she was examined and found to have chest bruises, that would take 20 days to heal. On 25 September on the il Fatto Quotidiano newspaper, a short video shot by Peacereporter seems to disprove any alleged assault on Santanchè. In the video, Santanchè is shown trying to cross the police barrier, while no assault on her is shown. Santanchè's lawyers dismissed the video as a fabrication, releasing a copy of the reports by the hospital and by the police.

=== 2011 diploma scandal ===
On 22 March 2011, the magazine Oggi published an article stating that although on her resume Santanchè claimed to have an MBA from the Bocconi University, the university itself had no record of having awarded her any such degree. Santanchè did not resign, claimed she was telling the truth and threatened to sue the magazine for libel. No evidence of her degree has turned up, although it appears that she did attend another, unspecified, course at the university.

=== Tax fraud investigations ===
On 5 July 2023, it was found she had been under investigation for false accounting since September 2022. However, she did not resign from her position as minister and a motion of no confidence against her was rejected by the Senate on 26 July 2023 in a 67–111 vote. On 17 January 2025, a judge in Milan ordered her to face trial.

== Electoral history ==
Election	House	Constituency	Party	Votes	Result
2001	Chamber of Deputies	Lombardy 3	AN	– (Note: Candidate in a closed list proportional representation system.)	Not elected
2006	Chamber of Deputies	Lombardy 3	AN	–	Elected
2008	Chamber of Deputies	Lombardy 3	LD	–	Not elected
2013	Chamber of Deputies	Lombardy 3	PdL	–	Elected
2018	Senate of the Republic	Lombardy – Cremona	FdI	146,541	Elected
2022	Senate of the Republic	Lombardy – Cremona	FdI	199,711	Elected
