= Massimo Garavaglia =

Italian politician (born 1968)

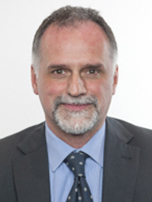

Minister of Tourism
- In office 13 February 2021 – 22 October 2022
- Prime Minister: Mario Draghi
- Preceded by: Dario Franceschini (as Minister of Cultural Heritage and Tourism)
- Succeeded by: Daniela Santanchè

Member of the Chamber of Deputies
- In office 23 March 2018 – 13 October 2022
- Constituency: Lombardy 1
- In office 28 April 2006 – 28 April 2008
- Constituency: Lombardy 1

Member of the Senate of the Republic
- Incumbent
- Assumed office 13 October 2022
- Constituency: Piedmont
- In office 28 April 2008 – 7 May 2013
- Constituency: Lombardy

Personal details
- Born: 8 April 1968 (age 58) Cuggiono, Italy
- Party: League (since 2017); Northern League (until 2020)
- Education: Bocconi University; University of Milan
- Profession: Politician, business consultant

Massimo Garavaglia (born 8 April 1968) is an Italian politician who served as Minister of Tourism in the Draghi Cabinet.

== Biography ==
Born in Cuggiono in the Province of Milan and resident in Marcallo con Casone, Massimo Garavaglia graduated in Economics from Bocconi University and in Political science from the University of Milan. He served as mayor of his municipality of residence, Marcallo con Casone, for two terms, from 1999 to 2009.

Garavaglia was elected to the Chamber of Deputies for the first time in 2006, among the ranks of the Northern League. In 2008 and 2013, he was elected to the Senate of the Republic . On 19 March 2013, he was appointed Regional Assessor for Economy, Growth and Simplification of Lombardy by Roberto Maroni, and resigned from the office of senator on 7 May 2013. On 13 October 2015, Garavaglia was investigated for an auction disturbance in the investigation that led to the arrest of the vice-president of Lombardy Mario Mantovani.

In the 2018 Italian general election, Garavaglia was re-elected to the Chamber of Deputies. On 12 June 2018, he was appointed Undersecretary at the Ministry of Economy in the first Conte fovernment. On 21 March 2019, he was promoted, together with Laura Castelli (M5S), Deputy Minister of Economy. On 12 February 2021, he was appointed Minister for Tourism in the Draghi government.
