= Salvatore Sciascia =

Italian publisher (1919–1986)

Salvatore Sciascia (Italian pronunciation: [salvaˈtoːre ʃˈʃaʃʃa]; 11 May 1919 in Sommatino – 19 April 1986 in Bari) was an Italian publisher. He founded a publishing house in 1946 in Caltanissetta.

He found several literary talents early in their careers, including: Leonardo Sciascia, Vicente Aleixandre (who won the Nobel Prize for Literature in 1997), Pier Paolo Pasolini, Alberto Bevilacqua, and Achille Campanile. He published a portrait of John F. Kennedy before his election as President of the United States, in the series Profiles.
