= Alfredo Messina =

Italian politician (1935–2025)

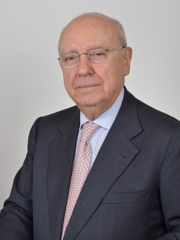
- Messina in 2018

Member of the Senate of the Republic of Italy for Lombardy
- In office 29 April 2008 – 12 October 2022

Personal details
- Born: 8 September 1935; Colleferro, Italy
- Died: 11 August 2025 (aged 89)
- Political party: FI (until 2009); PdL (2009–2013); FI (2013–2025)
- Occupation: Consultant

Alfredo Messina (8 September 1935 – 11 August 2025) was an Italian politician. A member of Forza Italia and The People of Freedom, he served in the Senate of the Republic from 2008 to 2022.

Messina died on 11 August 2025, at the age of 89.
