= List of Università Cattolica del Sacro Cuore people =

The list of Università Cattolica del Sacro Cuore people includes notable graduates, professors, and administrators affiliated with Università Cattolica del Sacro Cuore (UCSC).

== Business ==
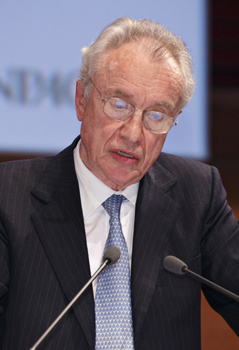
Giovanni Bazoli

- Giovanni Bazoli (professor), Intesa Sanpaolo President
- Angelo Caloia (alumnus & professor), Vatican Central Bank President
- Andrea Cardamone (alumnus), Widiba S.p.A.(Banca Monte dei Paschi di Siena) CEO
- Giacomo Campora (alumnus), Allianz Bank Financial Advisors S.p.A. CEO
- Gianpaolo Marini (alumnus), Rolex S.p.A. CEO
- Pasquale Cannatelli (alumnus), Fininvest CEO
- Gabriele Del Torchio (alumnus), Ducati Motor Holding S.p.A. CEO
- Dino Piero Giarda (alumnus & professor), Banca Popolare Italiana President and Banco Popolare Vice-president
- Ettore Gotti Tedeschi (alumnus), President of the Institute for Works of Religion
- Siro Lombardini (alumnus & professor), Banca Popolare di Novara President
- Augusto Marietti (alumnus), inventor and technology entrepreneur
- Enrico Mattei (alumnus), ENI Founder and President
- Michele Norsa (alumnus), Salvatore Ferragamo CEO
- Susan Oguya (alumna), businesswoman, designer, and entrepreneur
- Roberto Poli (professor), ENI President
- Claudio Raimondi (alumnus), EBAY General Manager
- Edilio Rusconi (alumnus), Rusconi Editore Founder and President
- Anna Maria Tarantola (alumnus & professor), RAI President
- Nicola Trussardi (alumnus), entrepreneur and fashion designer

== Politics ==
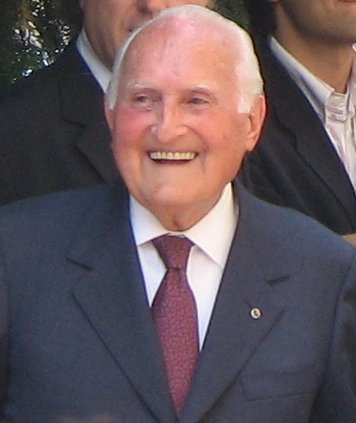
Oscar Luigi Scalfaro

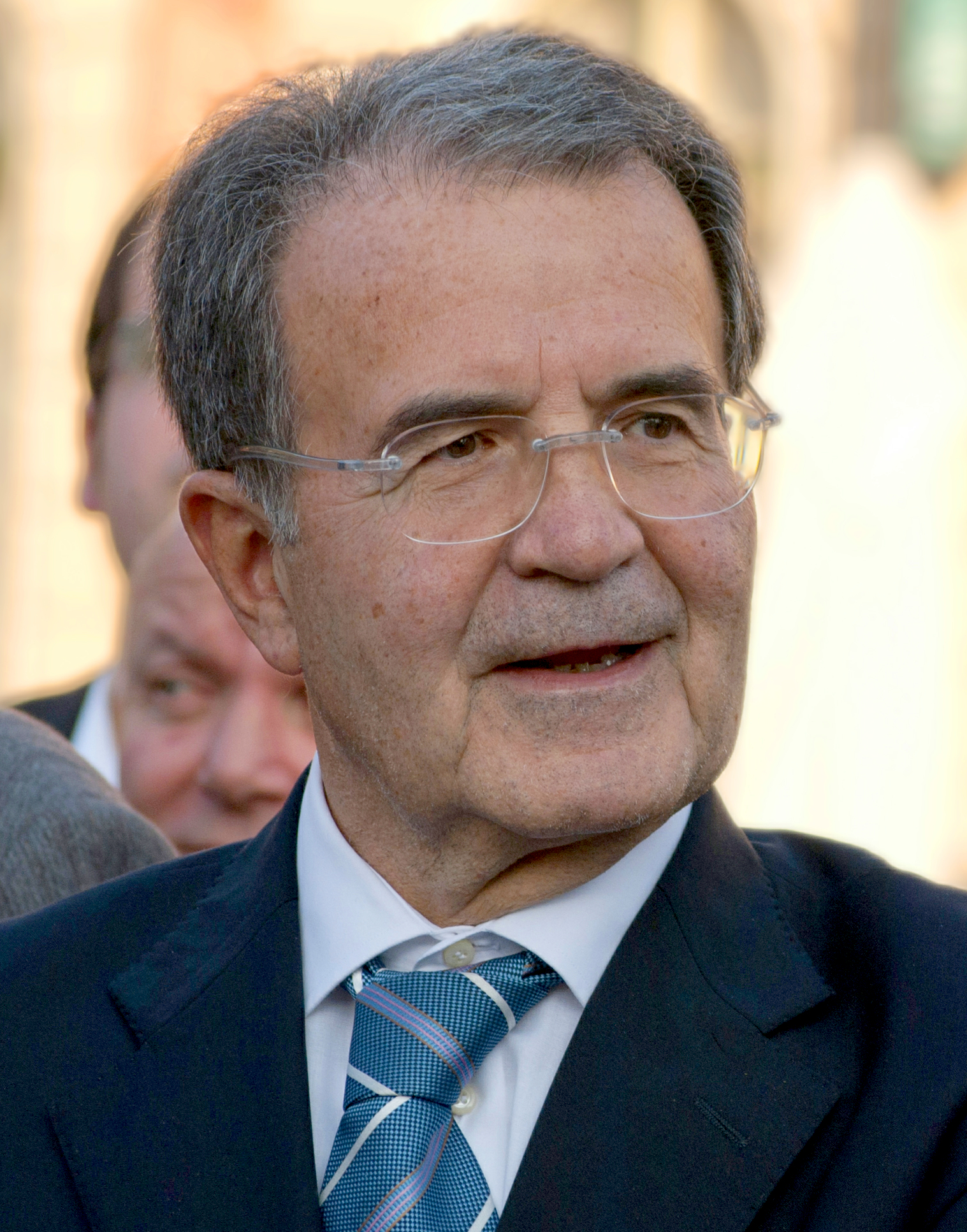
Romano Prodi

- Angelino Alfano (alumnus), Minister of Justice
- Beniamino Andreatta (alumnus & professor), Minister of Defense
- Renato Balduzzi (professor), Minister of Health
- Gerardo Bianco (alumnus & professor), Partito Popolare Italiano leader
- Michela Vittoria Brambilla (alumnus), Under-Secretary for Tourism
- Ombretta Fumagalli Carulli (alumnus & professor), Minister of Health and founder of the Antimafia committee
- Ciriaco De Mita (alumnus & professor), Prime Minister
- Amintore Fanfani (alumnus & professor), Prime Minister
- Giuseppe Fioroni (alumnus & professor), Minister of Education
- Giovanni Maria Flick (alumnus), Minister for Justice and Constitutional Court President
- Roberto Formigoni (alumnus), Regione Lombardia President
- Maria Pia Garavaglia (alumnus), Minister of Health
- Dino Piero Giarda (professor), Minister for Platform Accomplishment and Relations with Parliament
- Elio Guzzanti (alumnus), Minister of Health
- Michaëlle Jean, Former Governor General of Canada and current Secretary-General of La Francophonie
- Cécile Kyenge (alumnus), Minister of Integration
- Nilde Iotti (alumnus), Parliament President
- Mario Mauro (alumnus), Member of the European Parliament
- Gianfranco Miglio (professor), Constitutionalist
- Filippo Maria Pandolfi (alumnus), Minister of Economy, Minister Agriculture, European Commission Vice-president
- Romano Prodi (alumnus), Prime minister, Democratic Party President, European Commission President
- Lorenzo Ornaghi (alumnus & professor), Minister of Culture
- Oscar Luigi Scalfaro (alumnus), President of the Republic
- Giovanni Spagnolli (alumnus), Parliament President
- Tiziano Treu (alumnus & professor), Minister of Labor, Minister of Transport

== Journalism ==
- Francesco Alberoni (professor), Corriere della Sera journalist & RAI president
- Monica Maggioni (professor), journalist
- Aldo Maria Valli (alumnus), vaticanist
- Vincenzo Mollica (alumnus), journalist and writer
- Benedetta Parodi (alumnus), TV host
- Cristina Parodi (alumnus), television broadcasts
- Irene Pivetti (alumnus), President of Italian Parliament, and television broadcasts
- William Willinghton (alumnus & professor), photographer
- Fabrizio Romano (alumnus), Sports Journalist

== Medicine and science ==
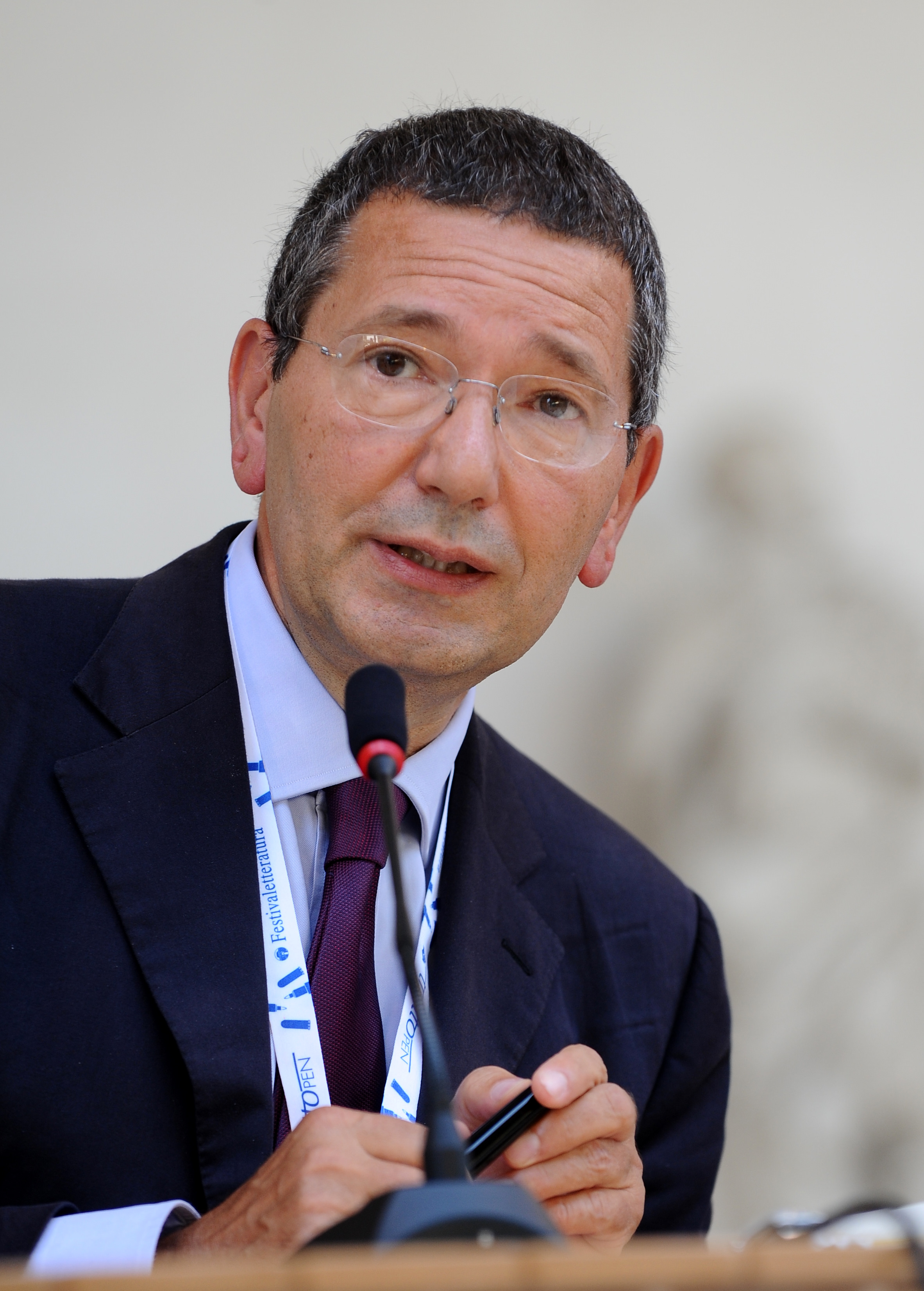
Ignazio Marino

- Elio Guzzanti (professor), doctor and Prime Minister of Health
- Ignazio Marino (alumnus & professor), doctor and politician
- Ignacio Matte Blanco (professor), psychiatrist
- Antonello Bonci, Scientific Director of National Institute on Drug Abuse
- Mario Gaudino, Professor of Cardiothoracic Surgery at Weill Cornell Medicine

== Intellectuals ==
- Lodovico Barassi (professor), lawyer
- Roberto Busa (professor), pioneers in the usage of computers for linguistic and literary analysis
- Valerio Massimo Manfredi (professor), archaeologist and writer
- Carla Carli Mazzucato (alumnus), artist
- Giuseppe Pontiggia (alumnus), writer
- Giovanni Reale (alumnus & professor), philosopher
- Giulio Salvadori (professor), literary critic and poet
- Vanni Scheiwiller (alumnus), publisher
- Emanuele Severino (alumnus), philosopher
- Giovanni Testori (alumnus), playwright and literary critic
- David Maria Turoldo (alumnus), poet

== Religion ==
- Adriano Bernareggi (professor), Catholic archbishop
- Maria Oliva Bonaldo (1893–1976), Catholic nun; founder of the Daughters of the Church
- Julián Carrón (professor), Comunione e Liberazione leader
- Giovanni Colombo (alumnus), Cardinal
- Luigi Giussani (professor), Comunione e Liberazione founder
- Attilio Nicora (alumnus), Cardinal
- Paolo Sardi (alumnus), Cardinal
- Angelo Scola (alumnus), Cardinal

== Academics ==
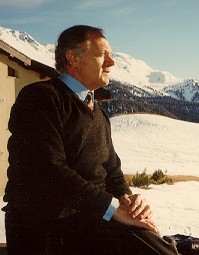
Luigi Pasinetti

- Maria Rosa Antognazza (alumnus), professor of philosophy at King's College London
- Mary Beckinsale (professor), president of SACI
- Michael Cox (professor), international relations scholar
- Marcel Danesi (professor), expert in language and communications
- Pio Fontana (professor), Italian literature
- Joseph Grieco (professor), international relations scholar
- John Ikenberry (professor), theorist of international relations and United States foreign policy
- Orsolina Montevecchi (alumnus & professor), papyrologist
- Luigi Pasinetti (alumnus & professor), economist
- Fausto Terrefranca (professor), musicologist
- Mahmood Sariolghalam (professor), international relations scholar

== Film, theater, and television ==
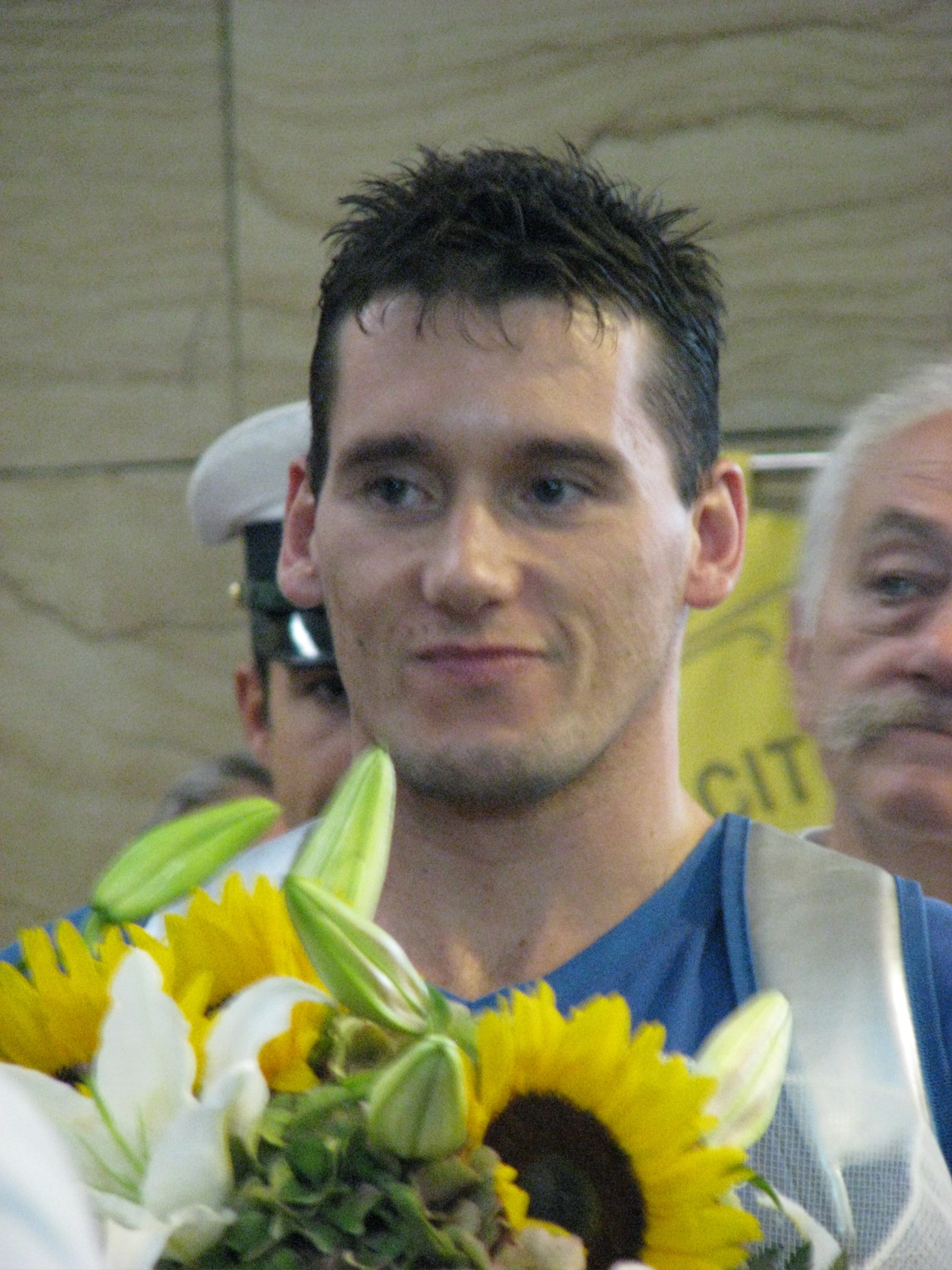
Igor Cassina

- Aldo Grasso (alumnus & professor), TV critic of Corriere della Sera
- Marta Pozzan (alumnus), actress, model
- Gian Luigi Rondi (alumnus), film director
- Ainett Stephens (alumnus), showgirl
- Silvia Toffanin (alumnus), television host and journalist

== Music ==
- Cristiano Godano (professor), singer
- Mira Pratesi Sulpizi (alumnus), composer
- Roberto Vecchioni (alumnus), singer

== Athletics ==
- Simon Barjie (alumnus), Gambian footballer
- Igor Cassina (alumnus), gymnast
- Michela Cerruti (alumnus), racing driver
