= San Damaso Ecclesiastical University =

Catholic university in Madrid

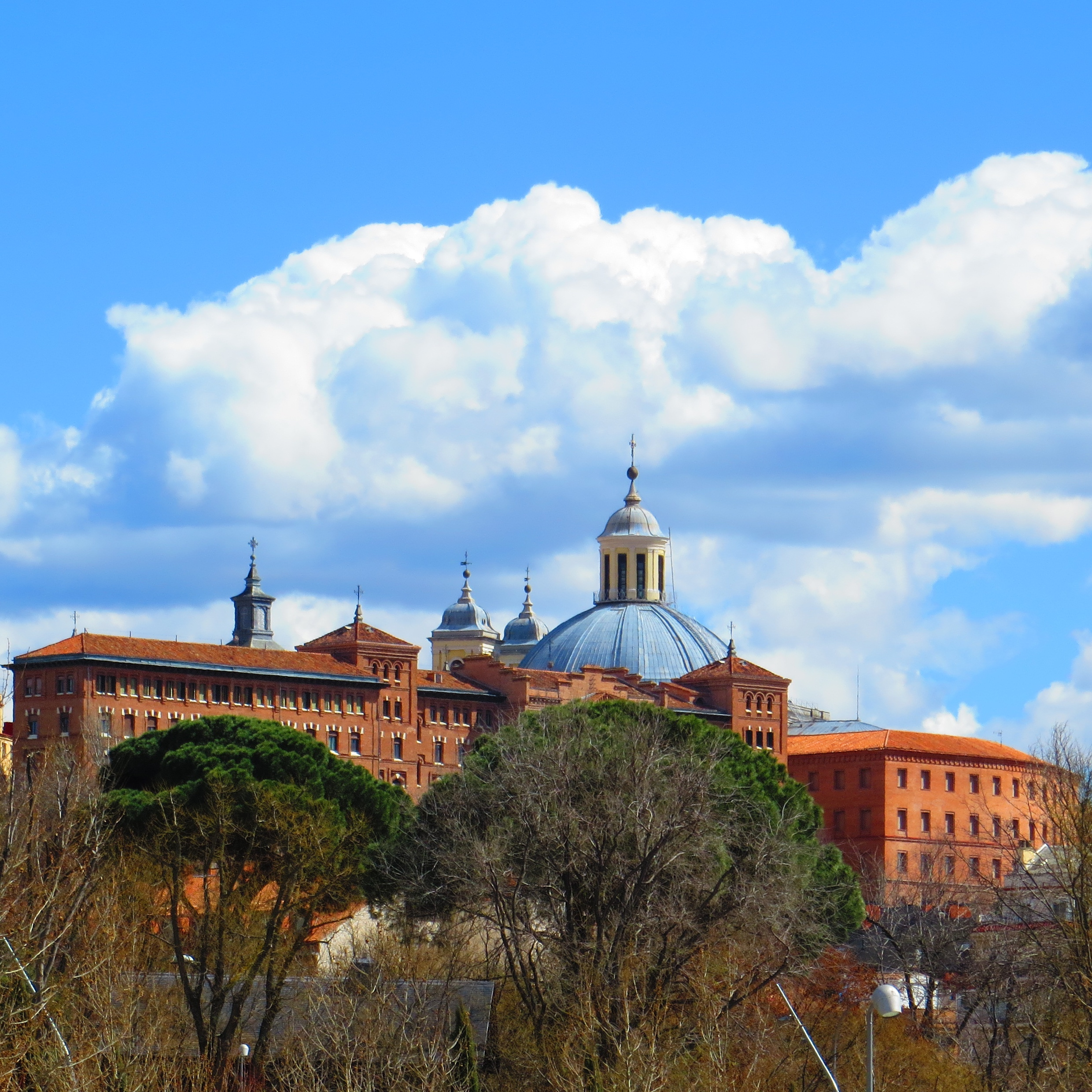
- Motto: Veritatis Verbum Communicantes (Latin)
- Established: June 28, 2011
- Religious affiliation: Roman Catholic
- Chancellor: Carlos Osoro Sierra
- Rector: Javier Maria Prades Lopez
- Location: Madrid, Spain; 40°24′39.67″N 3°42′56.13″W
- Website: www.sandamaso.es

The San Damaso Ecclesiastical University is a catholic university erected by the Holy See in the Archdiocese of Madrid (Spain). It teaches Philosophy, Theology, Classical Philology, Canon Law and Religion Sciences with official validity in all the universities of the Catholic Church. Its name is taken from the Pope Damasus I.

It is located in the center of Madrid, in Spain, next to the famous basilica of San Francisco el Grande and contiguous to the Conciliar Seminary of Madrid, where is the headquarters of the library and the Faculty of classical and Christian Letters.

Under the motto "Veritatis Verbum communicantes", the University performs a task of training aspirants to the priesthood or other forms of consecrated life, although it is open to anyone who wants to deepen scientifically and rigorously in the Catholic faith. In addition, he actively collaborates in different educational programs of the Archdiocese of Madrid, such as the permanent formation of priests and the School of pastoral agents.

== History ==
The San Damaso University has more than a century of history behind it. It originated in the Conciliar Seminary of Madrid. In 1990 it is approved by the Congregation for the Catholic Education the Center of Studies San Damaso. Thanks to the efforts of the then Archbishop of Madrid, Antonio María Rouco Varela, it grew considerably and achieved ever more prestige and institutional consolidation. Thus, in 1996 he was erected in the Faculty of Theology. In that year he already had the Institute of Religious Sciences and the San Justino Institute associated with it. But from that moment on, he began to take steps in order to expand their teaching offer. In 2000, the Statutes of the Institute of Religious Sciences were approved, in 2007 the Institute of Canon Law was founded and in 2008 the Faculty of Philosophy. In 2010, the San Justino Institute becomes the Faculty of Christian and classical literature.

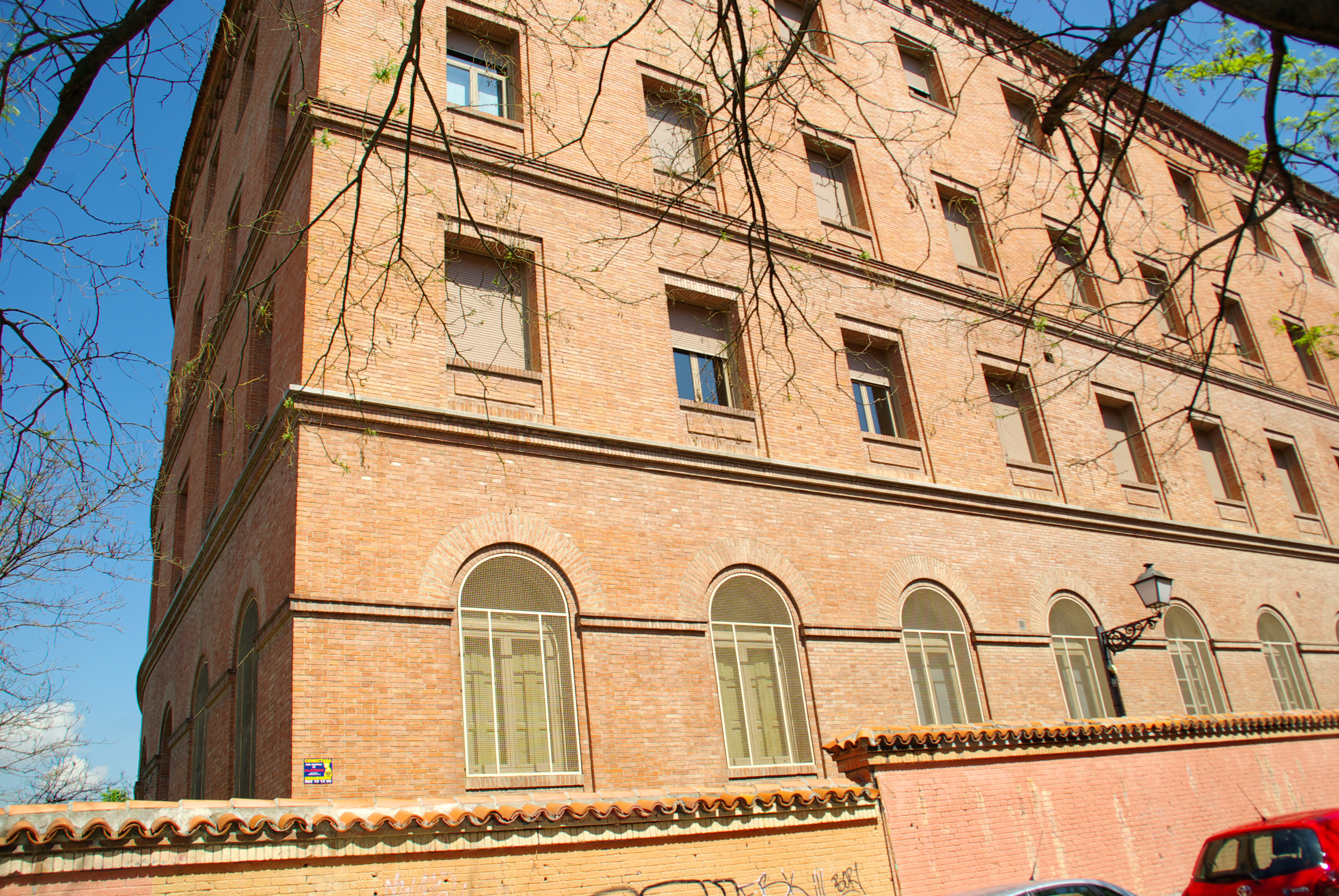
Central headquarters of the San Dámaso University in Madrid

Finally, in 2011 the Institute of Canon Law also became a Faculty of Law. In this same year, the Holy See, through the Congregation for Catholic Education erects "San Damaso" on June 28 as Ecclesiastical University. Javier Prades Lopez was appointed delegate of the archbishop of Madrid, Antonio Maria Rouco Varela. On the 3rd of October of the same year he presided the first solemn inauguration as a university in the company of Zenon Grocholewski, cardinal prefect of the Congregation for Catholic Education, who gave the inaugural lesson.

On December 22, 2011, the theologian Javier Maria Prades Lopez was appointed first rector of the Ecclesiastical University San Damaso, position of which takes possession on January 27, 2012. In 2012 is erected the new institute superior of Religious Sciences with two sections: face-to-face and distance. It is the result of the integration of the remote SCCRR San Agustin to the ISCCRR San Damaso.

This university center has had a number of distinguished personalities and students, including the renowned Spanish philosopher Xavier Zubiri, who began his studies in what was then only Madrid Seminary. He had also studied there, after his conversion, the philosopher Manuel Garcia Morente. Outstanding were the visits of then Cardinal Ratzinger, then Pope Benedict XVI, the famous theologian Hans Urs von Balthasar or who later became secretary of the Congregation for the Doctrine of the Faith, Luis Francisco Ladaria Ferrer. Recently, on the occasion of his tragic demise, Spanish public opinion has known for years that he was dean of the Faculty of Theology, Pablo Dominguez Prieto. In their classrooms have also taught Julian Carron, who later became president of the fraternity Communion and Liberation and the well-known philosopher Julián Marías.

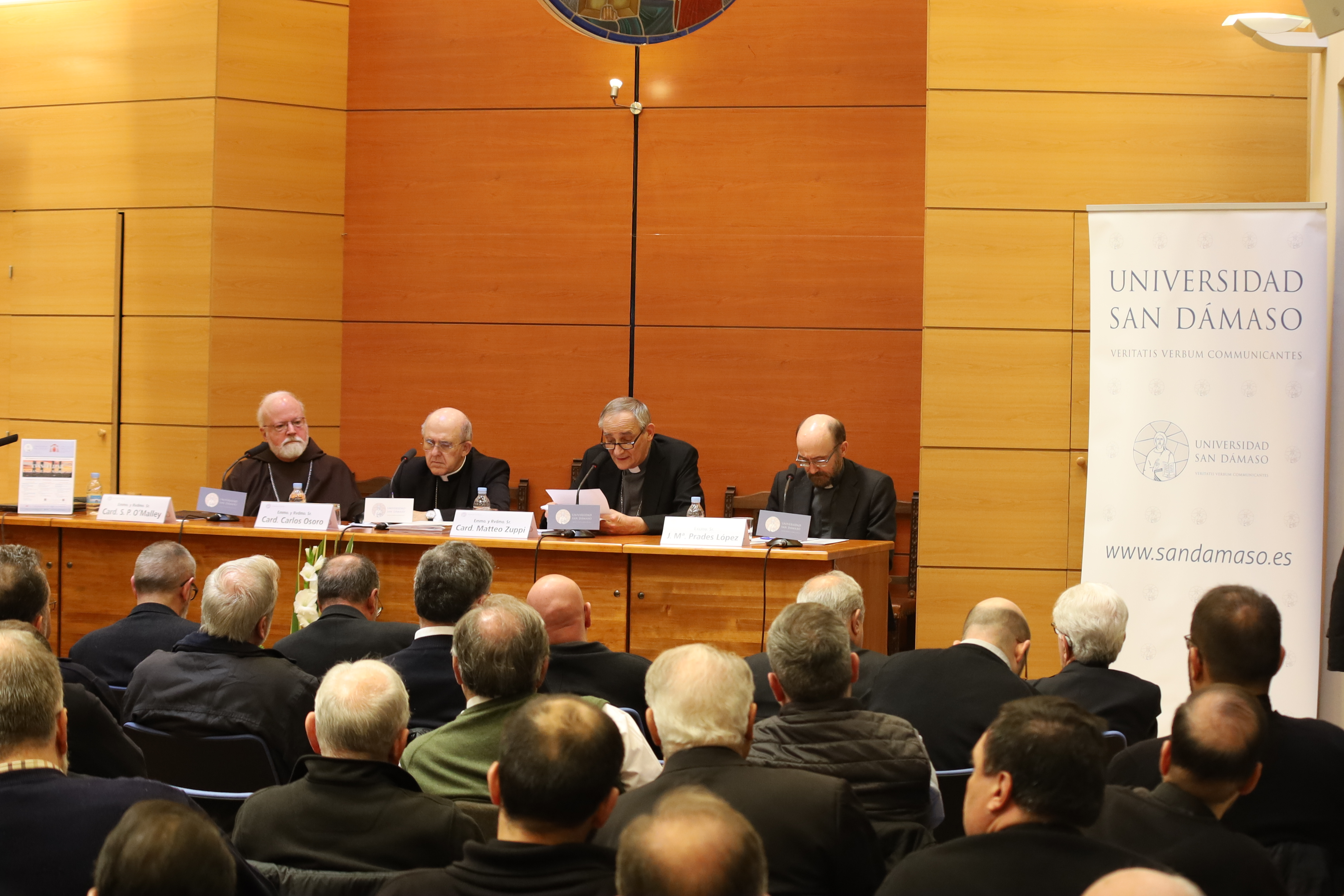
Conference at San Dámaso University

It is worth noting the large library, which has many volumes, some of a certain value and antiquity; many of them saved by Jose Maria Garcia Lahiguera during the course of religious persecution during the Spanish Civil War. The library fulfills, besides the academic functions, a mission of offering of the Christian culture to the contemporary world. Its catalog is accessible by internet.

It has an Office of Research and International Relations that allows its own students to study in various universities in Europe and students in Europe in the San Damaso thanks to the Erasmus Programme.

During the 2021/2022 academic year, the Faculty of Theology celebrates its 25th anniversary.

== Academic affiliations ==
The University is linked to the following centers, through its Faculty of Theology:

- Good Shepherd Major Seminary (Benguela - Angola)
- Study Center of the San Pelagio Major Seminary (Córdoba)
- “Lumen Gentium” Institute of Theology (Granada Major Seminary)
- Regional Plan of Studies of the Monasticium of the Spanish Region of the Cistercian Order of the Narrow Observance.
- Council Seminary of San Bartolomé in Cádiz
- Pontifical Seminary Santo Tomás de Aquino (Santo Domingo - Dominican Republic)

It also has as an addition to the Higher Institute of Theological Studies "San Ildefonso" (Toledo) and sponsors the following institutes:

- Higher Institute of Religious Sciences "Beata Victoria Díez" (Córdoba)
- Higher Institute of Religious Sciences "Santa María" (Toledo)

== Notable professors ==
- Ángel R. Garrido Herrero, priest
- Pablo Domínguez Prieto, priest
- Julián Carrón, president of Communion and Liberation, rector of the Madrid Seminary (1987-1994)
- Julián Marías, philosopher
- José María García Lahiguera, archbishop of Valencia from (1969-1978)
- Juan de Dios Martín Velasco, priest
- Cesar Franco Martinez, bishop of Segovia
- Pilar González Casado.
- Antonio Maria Rouco Varela, cardinal of the Roman Catholic Church
