= Montevecchi =

Montevecchi (pronounced [ˌmonteˈvɛkki]) is an Italian surname. Notable people with the surname include:

- Liliane Montevecchi (1932–2018), French actress, dancer and singer
- Michela Montevecchi (born 1971), Italian politician
- Orsolina Montevecchi (1911–2009), Italian papyrologist
- Silvano Montevecchi (1938–2013), Italian Roman Catholic bishop
