= Ludger Kühnhardt =

German political scientist (born 1958)

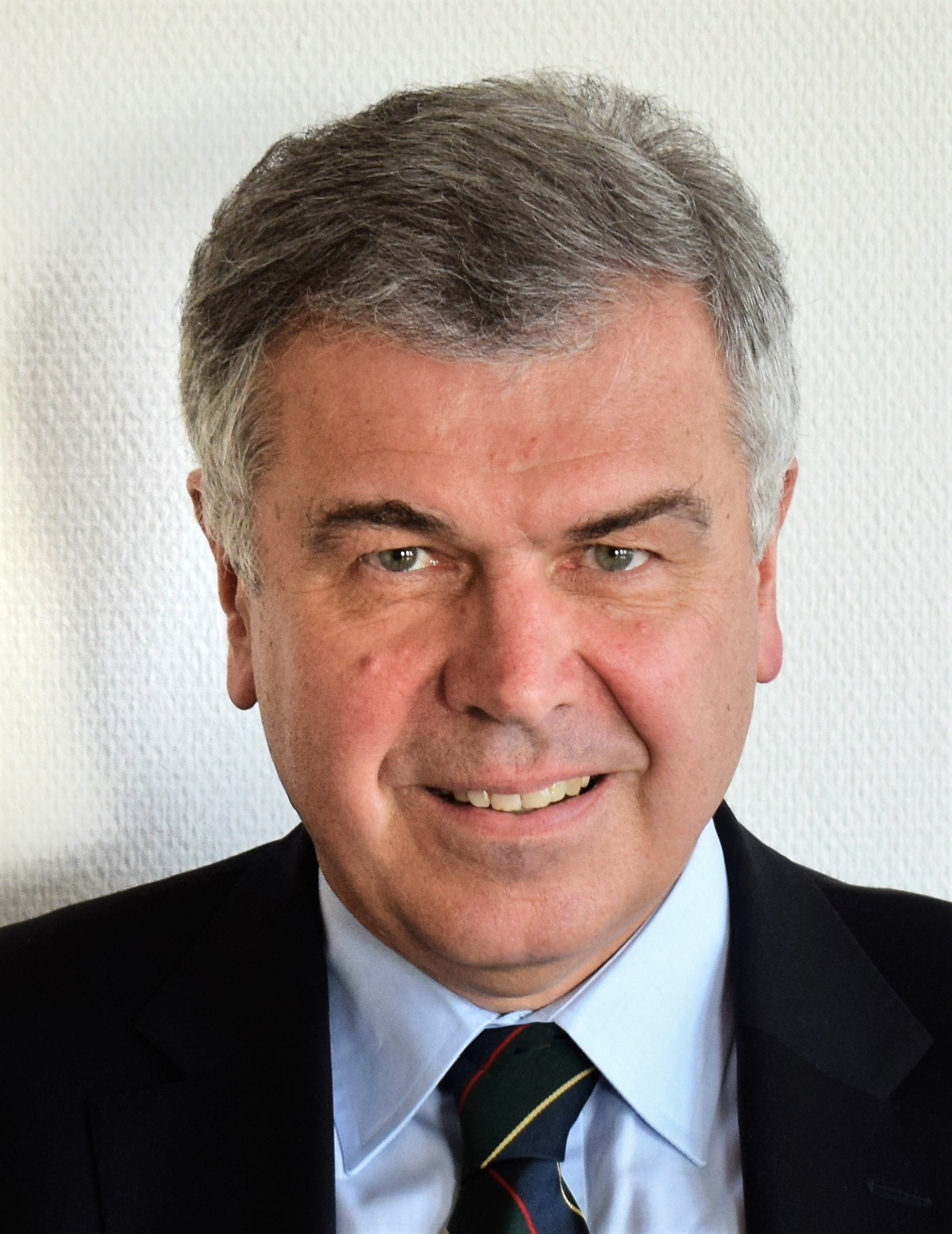
- Born: 4 June 1958 (age 68); Münster, West Germany
- Occupation: Director of ZEI
- Known for: Studies on European integration, global governance, and human rights

Academic background
- Education: University of Bonn

Academic work
- Discipline: Political science
- Institutions: University of Freiburg; University of Bonn; Center for European Integration Studies (ZEI)

Ludger Kühnhardt (born 4 June 1958) is a German political scientist, journalist and political advisor. From 1991 until 1997, he was Professor of Political Science at the University of Freiburg. From 1997 until his retirement in July 2024, he was Director at the Center for European Integration Studies (ZEI) and Professor at the Institute for Political Science and Sociology at the University of Bonn.

== Biography ==
Ludger Kühnhardt was born on 4 June 1958 in Münster. He was born as the eldest of four children of the ophthalmologist Gerhard Kühnhardt and the kindergarten teacher Irmgard Kühnhardt, née Hoffmann. After graduating from the Goethe-Gymnasium in Ibbenbüren, Kühnhardt completed editorial training at the German Journalism School in Munich in 1977/78. He then worked as a freelance journalist, primarily for the Deutsche Zeitung/Christ und Welt (later merged to form Rheinischer Merkur), Deutsche Welle and Westdeutscher Rundfunk. In 1979 he was awarded the Catholic German Journalist Prize. Kühnhardt carried out extensive journalistic reporting trips through Asia and Africa and made TV documentaries in South Korea, Bangladesh and India. He did his community service looking after refugees (boat people) from Vietnam.

Kühnhardt completed his studies in history, philosophy and political science in 1983 with a doctorate under the supervision of Karl Dietrich Bracher at the University of Bonn. His dissertation was entitled Die Flüchtlingsfrage als Weltordnungsproblem (The refugee question as a global order problem). In preparation for his doctorate, research studies took him to the archives of the League of Nations and the UNHCR in Geneva as well as to refugee camps around the world. Kühnhardt undertook postgraduate studies in 1983/84 at Sophia University and at the International Christian University in Tokyo and in 1984/85 at Harvard University (Kennedy Memorial Fellow). Subsequently, he worked as Karl Dietrich Brachers last research assistant before Brachers retirement in Bonn. In January 1987 he received his habilitation from the Philosophical Faculty of the University of Bonn. His habilitation thesis, entitled Die Universalität der Menschenrechte. Studie zur ideengeschichtlichen Bestimmung eines politischen Schlüsselbegriffs (The Universality of Human Rights) is considered a standard work.

From March 1987 to June 1989, Kühnhardt worked as a speechwriter for Federal President Richard von Weizsäcker in the German Federal President's Office. He then carried out research studies at St Antony's College in Oxford. In 1990/91 he was pro-tem professor for political science at the University of Bonn and from 1990 to 1992 a visiting professor in the history seminar at the University of Jena, supporting the development of Political Science at that university after German reunification. In 1991, Kühnhardt was appointed by the Baden-Württemberg Science Minister to the Chair of Scientific Politics (succeeding Arnold Bergstraesser and Wilhelm Hennis) at the University of Freiburg. In 1994/95 he served as Dean of his faculty.In 1997, Ludger Kühnhardt was appointed director of the Center for European Integration Studies (ZEI) at the University of Bonn, which was founded as part of the scientific expansion of Bonn after the decision to move the German capital to Berlin. This appointment was combined with an appointment as professor of political science at the Bonn Seminar for Political Science (today the Institute for Political Science and Sociology). Together with Jürgen von Hagen (economist) and Christian Koenig (legal scholar), Kühnhardt built up and led ZEI over more than 25 years as an internationally renowned research, outreach and further education institution. ZEI conducted several hundred research projects, was involved in political consultancy work and built up a lasting reputation with its successful "Master of European Studies – Governance and Regulation" with alumni from more than hundred countries around the globe. He denied professorial appointments to Vienna and Hong Kong.Visiting professorships and longer research stays took Kühnhardt to St Antony's College at Oxford, the University of Cape Town, the al-Farabi Kazakh National University in Almaty, the Collège d'Europe in Bruges, the Institute for Human Sciences in Vienna, Stanford University, Dartmouth College (New Hampshire), and Woodrow Wilson International Center for Scholars (Washington, D.C.), the Seoul National University, the University of Canterbury in Christchurch, the Tongji University in Shanghai and the Universidade Federal de Santa Catarina in Florianópolis. Beyond his retirement Kühnhardt teaches as Visiting Professor at the Università Cattolica del Sacro Cuore (Alta Scuola di Economia e Relazioni Internazionali, ASERI) in Milan (since 1997), at the Diplomatic Academy in Vienna (since 2002) and at the Mediterranean Academy of Diplomatic Studies (MEDAC) in Malta (since 2007).

Kühnhardt has repeatedly worked as an advisor to political and church actors, for example for the Secretary General of the Council of Europe, the President of the European Parliament, the Parliament of the West African regional organization ECOWAS, the Secretary General of the ACP Group (now: Organization of African, Caribbean and Pacific States OACPS) and the German Catholic Bishops' Conference. He supported the governments of Lithuania, Latvia, Slovakia, Bulgaria and Croatia on their way to EU membership. For many years he worked pro bono on the governing board of the European Humanities University (EHU) in Vilnius, on the Steering Committee of the Koenigswinter Conference and the Young Leader Conferences of the Atlantik-Brücke (Atlantic Bridge), in the development of West Africa Institute in Praia and in the advisory group for EU studies at the Asia-Europe Foundation in Singapore. He continues pro bono work beyond his retirement on the board of trustees of the "Forum Mitteleuropa" ("Forum Central Europe") at the Saxon state parliament. At the request of German Chancellor Helmut Kohl, Kühnhardt took part in the Christian Democratic Union's CDU, program commission in 1992/94, which developed the first party program after German reunification. After the German 'Grand Coalition' was established in 2005, he left the CDU, saw himself as "politically homeless" and remained independent of any party affiliation. Kühnhardt supervised over 30 habilitation theses and dissertations at the universities of Freiburg and Bonn. He maintained a regular, lively connection with his former doctoral students for over three decades in the context of "Freiburger Politikdialog/Bonner Europakolloquium". Kühnhardt regularly published in leading daily newspapers (Neue Zürcher Zeitung, Frankfurter Allgemeine Zeitung, Die Welt) and appeared on television (Phoenix) as a commentator on political events. Ludger Kühnhardt has been married to the Hungarian Enikö Noemi Kühnhardt, née Auer, since 1993. The couple has two children. Kühnhardt is a Roman Catholic.

== Research priorities and early publications ==
As scholar and journalist, Kühnhardt deals in his research and teaching with the history of political ideas and a normatively based democratic theory, with development problems, especially focussing on cultural and religious aspects, issues of international order as well as with fundamental questions of the European Union and comparative global regional integration. His aim is to place events and processes in contemporary history in a larger context in order to make them better understandable and to deepen their respective historical and philosophical significance.So far (as of 2024) Kühnhardt has published 44 monographs, more than thousand scholarly articles, essays and journalistic texts as well as 28 books as co-author or co-editor in 25 languages (German, English, French, Italian, Spanish, Dutch, Polish, Japanese, Chinese, Hungarian, Finnish, Russian, Vietnamese, Portuguese, Romanian, Bulgarian, Czech, Turkish, Estonian, Korean, Thai, Bahasa Indonesia, Icelandic, Slovak, Lithuanian). He has edited 88 volumes in a series of publications by the Center for European Integration Studies. Kühnhardt has given public lectures in 102 countries. His articles and books were published in 25 languages.

Already his first published articles and books received attention and criticism. His book Christliche Soziallehre konkret. Gedanken und Perspektiven (Christian Social Teaching Concrete. Thoughts and Perspectives) was published in 1977. During his high school days, Kühnhardt was strongly influenced by Oswald von Nell-Breuning, the doyen of Catholic social teaching and social science. In 1980, after his first study trips through Africa and Asia, Kühnhardt published Die deutschen Parteien und die Entwicklungspolitik (The German Parties and Development Policy), a critical analysis of German development policies. After spending longer periods in two very different villages in India, in 1982 Kühnhardt published a collection of journalistic reports entitled The Land of 500,000 Villages. Stories from rural India. The Indian journalist M.N.Hebbar spoke of a "small, but readable book" (Culture Talk. Journal of the Indo-German Societies, 1982). The "Malayalam Literary Survey" judged that the book "provides a vivid picture...Anyone who wants to study the conditions of life prevailing in the villages of India will find this book interesting and instructive" (April/June 1982, p. 68). A year before, in 1981, Kühnhardt had published an essay about the German post-1968 generation, to which he felt he belonged: Kinder des Wohlstands. Auf der Suche nach dem verlorenen Sinn (Children of Prosperity. In Search of Lost Meaning).

== Main publications ==
a) Monographs

Die Flüchtlingsfrage als Weltordnungsproblem (The refugee question as a world order problem)

In his 1984 dissertation, Kühnhardt was among the first scholars linking the humanitarian drama of refugee movements worldwide during the 19th and 20th centuries (by then there were already 250 million refugees) to their political and ideological causes and their inadequate combat. He warned that unresolved problems of power and violence in countries of origin of refugees as well as unresolved integration issues in a new place can lead to the "Palestinization" of refugee misery and consequently new security and power conflicts. Kühnhardt advocated a precise use of terminology and distinguished between voluntary migration and "forced migration". His work received international attention and was still cited decades later when the global refugee issue finally gained political interest. In an essay published in 2017, Kühnhardt criticized that lack of combatting root causes of refugee movements. He warned against a cultural uprooting of refugees by accepting them in places far away from their homeland, which would only lead to new tensions in the receiving societies. Therefore, Kühnhardt argued, the German borders should have been closed to Arab asylum seekers in 2015 after the initial "welcome weekend".

Die Universalität der Menschenrechte (The universality of human rights)

The study – Kühnhardt's habilitation thesis from 1987 – provided an overview of the history of ideas as well as comparative cultural studies and empirical analysis of the question of whether and to what extent human rights – formulated as universally valid in the UN Declaration of Human Rights – actually apply to every cultural-religious and political sphere of ideas. Despite severe restrictions on their universality in Chinese, Japanese, Islamic, Indian, African and communist political thought, Kühnhardt attested to the gradual universalizability of human rights based on the standards formulated by the United Nations. At the same time, he warned against over-expanding the catalog of human rights. The book triggered media and academic controversies. The study, which can be described as a standard work (28), was also widely received internationally, in political and legal sciences as well as in several area studies and political circles. As recently as 2004, British historian Timothy Garton Ash re-confirmed the conclusion from Kühnhardt's study that there was "very little evidence in other cultures" for the idea of human rights.

Stufen der Souveränität (Stages of sovereignty)

With the study "Stufen der Souveränität" ("Stages of Sovereignty"), published in 1991, Kühnhardt expanded his research to issues of world order. Contrary to the assumption that history would end after the end of the Cold War, he saw Western industrialized countries as increasingly challenged by the demands of the states in the southern hemisphere. The study stated that in what is called today the global South, a genuine concept of state, nation and sovereignty had emerged. Reviews lauded the combination of an empirical and ideational (history of ideas) approach of the book.

Revolutionszeiten (Revolutionary times)

Following his 1992 analysis of the founding of the European Union with the Treaty of Maastricht (signed on February 7, 1992, in force on November 1, 1993) in the light of the idea of federalism, Kühnhardt categorized and contextualized the upheavals of the years 1989/1991 historically, spanning a perspective from revolutions in ancient Rome to the bloody revolutions in Russia and China in the 20th century. In the midst of a contentious controversy over the conceptual attribution of recent events, he described the current and ongoing upheavals in Europe as a revolution and compared them with the great revolutions of history. Drawing on Hannah Arendt's concept of revolution, he emphasized the contemporary historical changes as a peaceful revolution in the spirit of freedom and European unification. The book was translated into Turkish by Hüseyin Bağcı and Senay Plassmann. It was considered particularly suitable for schools by the Turkish Ministry of Culture. In Germany, the Federal Agency for Political Education provided a large print of a study edition. As recently as 2017, excerpts of Kühnhardt's book were quoted in an exhibition by the Federal Foundation for the Study of the Communist Dictatorship in Germany (Bundesstiftung Aufarbeitung ) and the German Historical Museum in Berlin.

Von der ewigen Suche nach Frieden (On the perpetual search for peace)

On the occasion of the 200th anniversary of the publication of Immanuel Kant's work On Perpetual Peace (1795), Kühnhardt attributed Kant's peace principles -as he wrote with an ironic undertone – to the perpetual search for peace in Europe. In his 1996 study, he analysed several "experiments" in European history to create order for the troubled continent: Hegemony and raison d'état (1618–1648); balance of power and legitimacy (1713–1815); hope for collective security (1815–1939). During the Cold War, according to Kühnhardt, world history was frozen. With the end of the East-West conflict, several new organizational structures became visible (including the UN Agenda for Peace and the transformation of the CSCE into the OSCE). At the same time, however, new forms of "world disorder" emerged (conflicts in Yugoslavia, the Caucasus, Central Asia, and Africa). Only NATO and the EU, Kühnhardt argued, were politically solid enough and rooted in law to guarantee stability for their respective member states. Critics discussed the study for its actualization of Kant's theory;.

Zukunftsdenker (Future thinkers)

With the study Zukunftsdenker (Future Thinkers), published in 1999, Kühnhardt updated proven ideas of political thought "that can provide timelessly valid, humane and freedom-promoting orientation" as he wrote later in his work biography. Based on intensive studies of the original sources and with an extensive discussion of the current state of research, Kühnhardt interpreted the following "Future Thinkers": Hannah Arendt, Alexis de Tocqueville, Thomas Hobbes, Niccolò Machiavelli, Aurelius Augustinus and Aristotle. He linked his text-based interpretations to the contemporary challenges to democracy theory. Book reviews praised the hermeneutical value, sometimes not without cultural pessimism.

Atlantik Brücke (Atlantic Bridge)

Kühnhardt sees himself as a transatlanticist. In his work biography, he explained that he had conceived his most important studies at American universities and think tanks: "Nowhere is the research infrastructure better, the atmosphere more inspiring, the world of horizons more beguiling for the expansion of one's own mind". For decades, Kühnhardt was active in the Atlantik Brücke, an influential German-American network. In 2002, on the occasion of the fiftieth anniversary of this unique transatlantic network organization, he reconstructed the history of the Atlantik Brücke mirroring German-American relations between 1952 and 2002. The book is simultaneously a study of contemporary history of German-American relations. US President George Bush (1989–1993) wrote in his foreword – which is rare for a scientific publication – that Kühnhardt not only portrayed the Atlantik Brücke itself "with admirable skill and remarkable success," but also showed how the ideas guiding it shaped five decades of German-American relations beyond the peaceful unification of Germany in a unifying Europe.

European Union – The Second Founding. The changing rationale of European integration

According to Kühnhardt, since the end of the Cold War, the European Union has been in a double process of re-founding: as a European social and governance system and as a global power among powers. In his study European Union – The Second Founding he meticulously recapitulated how the EU (and previously the EEC and the EC) reacted to crises and thereby advanced the European integration processes. While instruments have been developed to mitigate and bargain internal frictions and conflicts of interests among EU member states, such an almost intuitively functioning set of instruments is only at an embryonic stage to project the EU's global political interests, according to his thesis. Nevertheless, as a book review underlined, this task is unavoidable, also in order to secure approval for the unification project within the EU. In the context of his study on the historic evolution and changing rationale of the EU, Kühnhardt edited the results of a research project which he conducted at St. Antony's College Oxford under the title Crises in European Integration. Challenges and Responses, 1945–2005. Simon Serfaty judged in the "Journal of Cold War Studies" that the texts by German scholars collected in the volume were "a compelling reason for hope in the future" of the EU.

Region building. The global proliferation of regional integration

With 'Region Building' Kühnhardt coined a new academic term in 2010. Based on the concept of 'nation building', which is widespread in the social sciences and politics, he argues that the limits of the concept of the nation state in large parts of the world have led to genuine efforts of regional cooperation and integration – thus is: region -building. European unification does not serve as a role model that can be adopted, but rather as a source of inspiration, and sometimes even as deterrence in order to avoid the mistakes done by the EU. Kühnhardt based his study on empirical research in South America and the Caribbean (System of Central American regional integration SICA, MERCOSUR, Andean Community CAN, Caribbean Community CARICOM), in Africa (African Union, seven regional economic communities), in Asia (Gulf Cooperation Council GCC, South Asian Association for Regional Cooperation SAARC, ASEAN), in the Pacific region (Pacific Islands Forum) and in Eurasia (Eurasian Union). The development of the Eurasian Union after the end of the Soviet Union shows a completely different model, which is oriented towards a hegemonic redefinition of Russian neo-imperial interests. According to Kühnhardt, the lack of sustainable concepts of regional integration in Northeast Asia and in the Middle East demonstrates the persistence of unresolved geopolitical constellations. The return of geopolitical rivalries has increasingly become a challenge for coherent regional cooperation and integration also in other regions of the world over the course of the 2010s. Kühnhardt discussed his assessments in lectures and in connection with policy consultancy work and scientific cooperation around the globe. In 2017, he addressed the 67.General Assembly of the UN Economic Commission for Europe (UNECE) with a key note on the theme 'region building'.

Africa Consensus. New Interests, Initiatives and Partners

Kühnhardt's study, published in 2014, about the interplay between genuinely African approaches to development and integration ("ownership") and the manifold interests of Africa's external partners served as an inspiration for the German federal government in 2017 in developing the G20 Compact with Africa during its term as G20 presidency. Kühnhardt, who has done field research in all 54 African countries, is an Africa-realist, trying to understand the African condition from within. He uses a historical perspective to assess the marginalization of Africa in global affairs and the ongoing transformation becoming a more self-asserted global player. "'Africa Consensus' is the rare book that treats Africa as the complex region that it is" Kingsley Y.Amoako wrote on the spine of the book. Ian Taylor reviewed the book as an overly optimistic interpretation of Africa.

The Global Society and Its Enemies

Empirically varying the dictum of philosopher Karl Popper about the open society and its enemies, Kühnhardt examined in 2017 the causes and circumstances of what – along with Pope Francis and King Abdullah II. of Jordan – he called the "Third World War". Kühnhardt analyzed the consequences of decolonization in the postcolonial age, tensions between spaces and politically constituted spheres, the ambivalence of borders and orders, and the tensions between human rights and collective identity politics (society vs.community). With reference to Popper's thesis that tribalism destroys humanism, Kühnhardt criticizes political Islam and Western anti-globalization movements as main opponents to a modern inclusive global society. The book was reviewed as valuable contribution to the ongoing confusion about global transformations.

Das politische Denken der Europäischen Union (The political thought of the European Union)

The textbook, published in 2022 with rich didactical material available online, was conceptualized in the context of teaching political science classes with input from students. Kühnhardt argues that in the meantime the European Union has given rise to a genuine genre of political thought. He distinguishes this from classical intellectual history, theories of international relations and European integration theories. Using a variety of examples – e.g. notions of EU decision-making, European sovereignty, key Euro-speech words such as community of values and EU citizenship – he dissects the principles, ideas and goals of the European Union as they have developed and changed in the course of European integration itself.

Connected Worlds

Study trips and field research, guest professorships and public lectures took Ludger Kühnhardt to all 193 member states of the United Nations and to 42 partially sovereign territories or defunct states (including the German Democratic Republic, Yugoslavia and the Soviet Union). During his stays outside Germany – which amount to a fifth of his life span – he wrote a diary, originally in German. The edited texts about encounters with a myriad of people and public figures, places of interest and impressions on local realities reconstruct the developments of today's global world in its dialectical interconnectedness and disunity during the time span between 1960 and 2020. The two volums provide a source for research and a colourful panorama through the lens of one of the most globe-trotting contemporary authors.

Building Bridges between Academia, Politics and Media. A Work Biography

In his biography, Kühnhardt reflects on the context of the creation and the impact of his most important scholarly work. He provides a lively account of his motivations and the inner connections of his work in research and teaching, his role models and the impulses he was able to give. The detailed work biography contains a bibliography of all his publications up to the time of his retirement in 2024.

b) Editor

Die doppelte deutsche Diktaturerfahrung (The double German experience with dictatorship)

One of the first efforts to conduct a structural-historical comparative analysis between the National Socialist dictatorship in the German Reich between 1993 and 1945 and the German Democratic Republic (GDR) between 1949 and 1990 was the anthology that Ludger Kühnhardt prepared and published with Freiburg students in 1993. The volume sheds light on systemic issues, institutional, political and societal aspects of the two dictatorships on German soil. Reviewers judged that the volume had "marked a safe point in a mined area" and considered the book and its underlying project as "overall successful".

The Bonn Handbook of Globality

Ludger Kühnhardt and Tilman Mayer have brought together contributions from 110 professors of Bonn University to answer the question of whether and to what extent the global turn is changing the European perspective on conceptualization, symbolization and interpretation of meaning in the humanities and cultural sciences. On the occasion of the 200th anniversary of the University of Bonn in 2018, the concept of globality is examined comprehensively in the spheres of human development, human communication, technical-instrumental appropriation of the world, the aesthetical-practical appropriation of the world as well as moral order and human mortality. All articles follow the same systematic (Terminology – Global Turn – Implications) and length. They are framed by essays discussing the methodology, context and content of the handbook. Reviewers praised the encyclopedia as expression of the intellectual profile of one of the leading research universities and described the conceptual work done in the two volums as "gigantic".

Im Gespräch bleiben (Staying in conversation)

For over three decades, Ludger Kühnhardt brought together current and former doctoral students for seminar meetings (Freiburger Politikdialog/Bonner Europakolloquium) mostly with contributions by the young scholars themselves. The legendary seminars – with the aim to remain in conversation beyond the years of university studies – which took place between 1994 and 2023 are documented in this book. A farewell lecture by Ludger Kühnhardt to his doctoral students concludes the dialogue project. In this lecture, Kühnhardt presents his view on the changes in German and European academia and politics during the three decades of his university activity.

== Bibliography ==
Among more than forty books, his publications include:

- Constituting Europe, Baden-Baden: Nomos 2003.
- European Union – The Second Founding. The Changing Rationale of European Integration, Baden-Baden: Nomos 2008 (2nd.revised edition 2010).
- Crises in European Integration. Challenges and Responses, 1945–2005, New York/Oxford: Berghahn Books 2009.
- Region Building (2 volumes). New York/Oxford: Berghahn Books 2010.
- Africa Consensus: New Interests, Initiatives and Partners. Washington D.C./Baltimore: Woodrow Wilson Center Press/Johns Hopkins University Press 2014.
- The Bonn Handbook of Globality (2 volumes, edited with Tilman Mayer). Cham: Springer International 2019.
- The Global Society and Its Enemies: Liberal Order Beyond the Third World War. Cham: Springer International 2017.
- Connected Worlds. Notes from 235 Countries and Territories (vol.1: 1960–1999; vol.2.2000–2020). Wiesbaden: Springer Nature 2023.
- Building Bridges between Academia, Politics and Media. A Work Biography. Wiesbaden: Springer VS 2024.
