= Stefan Fröhlich =

Stefan Fröhlich is the name of:

- Stefan Fröhlich (German general) (1889–1978), German general
- Stefan Fröhlich (political scientist) (born 1958), German political scientist
