= Norsa =

Norsa is a surname. Notable people with the surname include:

- Hannah Norsa (1712–1784), English Jewish actress and singer
- Medea Norsa (1877–1952), Italian papyrologist and philologist
- Michele Norsa (born 1948), Italian manager
