= Silvana Lattmann =

Italian-Swiss poet and author (1918–2023)

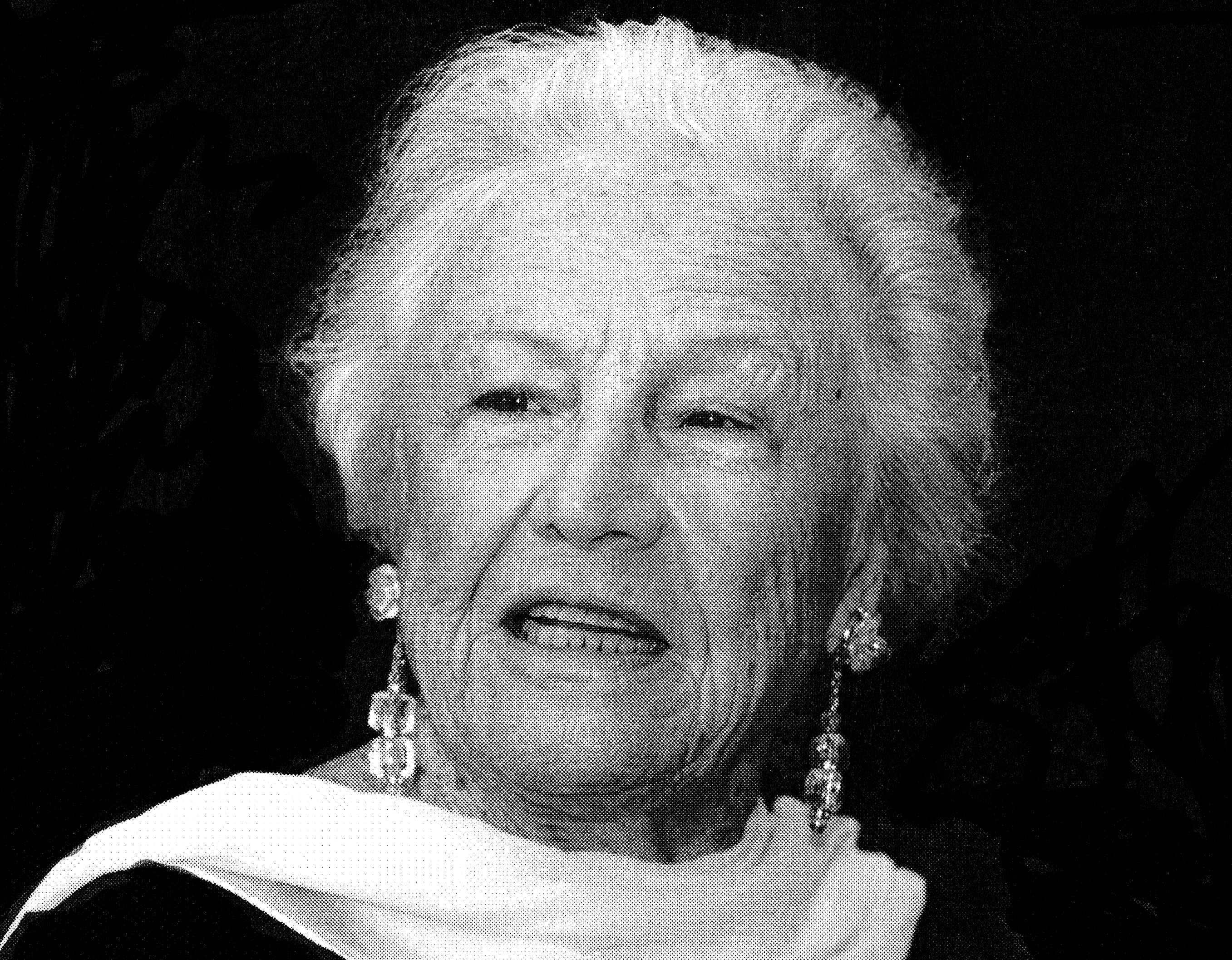
- Born: Silvana Abruzzese; 8 November 1918; Naples, Italy
- Died: 19 July 2023 (aged 104); Rüschlikon, Switzerland
- Occupations: Biologist; poet; author
- Notable work: Fessura; Malâkut; Nata il 2018
- Awards: Schiller Prize

Silvana Lattmann (née Abruzzese; 8 November 1918 – 19 July 2023) was an Italian-Swiss biologist, poet and author. She is known for poetry in Italian, and a memoir, Nata il 1918.

== Early life and education ==
Silvana Abruzzese was born in Naples, Italy, on 8 November 1918. Her parents were the lawyer Alfonso Abruzzese and Alba Scanferla from Padova. Her father died from an injury he had received in World War I, before she was one year old. The family then moved often, to Sanremo, Rome, Milan and Genoa. She attended university in Rome and Genoa to study biology and natural sciences, graduating in July 1942.

She then married Michele Sgarlata, a naval engineer stationed on the Italian submarine Porfido operating in the Mediterranean; it was torpedoed and sunk on 6 December 1942 killing almost all the crew, including her husband. In 1943 she gave birth to their son Massimo.

== Career ==
Lattmann is known as a writer of poems and fiction but only started publishing her work in the 1970s, the decade in which she turned sixty. She first worked in several areas, including in biological science research. After World War II, she was employed as an assistant at the University of Milan and as a researcher at the Stazione Zoologica Anton Dohrn, a multidisciplinary biological research institute in Naples. Between 1948 and 1954 she taught in secondary schools in Bergamo, Milan and Rome.

Her first published works were poems in the anthology Almanacco dello Specchio in 1978, and then in 1980 Le storie di Ariano that contained more of her poems as well as literary studies. The critical success of Fessura (Crevice) in 1983, and mentorship by Pio Fontana, the professor of Italian literature at the University of St. Gallen, led her to publish collections of poems regularly until the 1990s. Her narrative poems relate to events over several generations that resolve tragedies. The figure of an angel, as a guide, mystery and representation of love is a recurring image in her poems.

In the 1990s, Lattmann began to study Eastern philosophies, which changed the direction of her writing. This was first seen in Malâkut (Space of the Angels in Farsi) published in 1996. She retained the image of an angel in this work. She published a memoir of her life up to 1942, Nata il 1918 (Born in 1918) in 2019.

== Personal life ==
In 1954, she married Charles Lattmann, an academic at the Swiss Federal Polytechnic in Zürich. She became a Swiss citizen, and moved with him to St. Gallen. They lived in Zürich from 1993 but also spent substantial time on the Italian island of Ischia in the early 2000s. A documentary, Brunngasse 8, was made of the house she lived in, and its inhabitants. She lived there in an apartment with medieval paintings on the walls. In 2022, she moved to a retirement home in Rüschlikon where she died on 19 July 2023, at age 104.

== Publications ==
Lattmann's published works include:

- Quindici poesie. In: Almanacco dello specchio. Mondadori, Milano 1978.
- Le storie di Ariano. Nuove edizioni Vallecchi, Firenze 1980.
- Fessura. Edizioni Casagrande, Bellinzona 1983.
- Assolo per tromba in fa maggiore. Edizioni Casagrande, Bellinzona 1985
- Il Viaggio. Edizioni Casagrande, Bellinzona 1987.
- Quarta serata. Poesie–Bloc Notes 17. 1988
- Su Rosa rosse rosa di Alida Airaghi. Bloc Notes, 1988.
- La vecchia signora e il Brünig-Bahn Landi. Verkehrshaus, Lucerna 1989.
- La favola del poeta, della principessa, della parola e del gerundio. Edizioni Casagrande, Bellinzona 1989.
- Malâkut. Vanni Scheiwiller, Milano 1996.
- Signa. Edizioni Florence Packaging, 1997. With Japanese calligraphy Irma Bamert.
- Deianira. Edizioni Casagrande, Bellinzona 1998.
- Tale un teatro per me. (Incisione di Samuele Gabai) Edizioni Pulcinoelefante, Osnago 1998.
- Incontri. (Grafica Alina Kalczynska, English translation by Sarah Thorne). Vanni Scheiwiller, Milano 1998.
- Da solstizio a equinozio. Interlinea edizioni, Novara 2001.
- Fuoco e memoria. Bertoncello 2002.
- Graugraugrau. Edizioni Pulcinoelefante, Osnago 2006.
- Le storie di Ariano. Edizioni Josef Weiss, Mendrisio 2008.
- Incustodite distanze. Interlinea edizioni, Novara 2008.
- Brunngasse 8. Interlinea edizioni, Novara 2010.
- Quando il sud s'incontra armoniosamente con il nord. Leggerti N. 20.
- La quadratura del cerchio. Edizioni Ulivo, Balerna 2014.
- Vita e viaggi di J.L. Burckhardt. Un incontro con l'Islam dell'Ottocento. Con illustrazioni d'epoca. Edizioni Interlinea, Novara, 2016.
- Nata il 1918, Edizioni Casagrande, Bellinzona 2018
- I colori della guerra, Interlinea edizioni 2019.

== Awards ==
Lattmann was awarded the Schiller Prize of the Swiss Schiller Foundation twice, in 1984 for Fessura, and in 1997 for Malâkut.
