= Mahmood Sariolghalam =

Iranian political scientist

- محمود سریع‌القلم
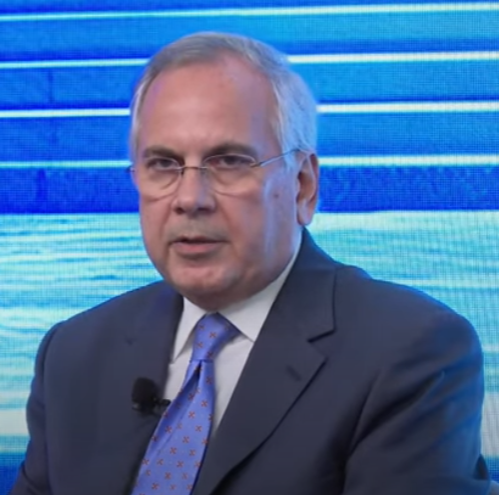
- Speaking at the World Economic Forum's Annual Meeting of the New Champions 2023
- Born: 1959 (age 66–67); Tehran, Iran
- Education: School of International Relations, University of Southern California; California State University, Northridge; Ohio State University
- Scientific career
- Fields: International Relations
- Workplaces: Shahid Beheshti University; School of International Relations, University of Southern California; Loyola Marymount University; Kuwait University; Middle East Institute; Center for Strategic Research
- Thesis: The international dimensions of the Western Saharan conflict (1987)
- Website: www.sariolghalam.com

Mahmood Sariolghalam (Persian: محمود سریع‌القلم; born 1959) is a professor of international relations at the School of Economics and Political Science in Shahid Beheshti University since 1987. He was born in Tehran, Iran, in 1959. He received his B.A. degree in political science/management from California State University, Northridge in 1980 and his M.A. and Ph.D. degrees in international relations from the University of Southern California in 1982 and 1987, respectively. Sariolghalam also completed a postdoctorate program at Ohio University in 1997. During the 2009–2010 academic year, he taught at Kuwait University. He is currently a professor at Loyola Marymount University continuing to teach international relations.

Sariolghalam specializes in international politics of the Middle East, Iranian foreign policy and political culture and has written extensively in Persian, Arabic and English. He is a member of the International Studies Association (US), Global Agenda Council of the World Economic Forum (Switzerland), and Advisory Group on Iran, the Atlantic Council. He's also a non-resident scholar at ASERI (Italy) and the Middle East Institute. In 2006, he attended Bilderberg Meeting in Ottawa, Canada. His current research focuses on the political psychology of authoritarianism and conceptual roots of Iranian foreign policy.

== Publications ==
- “Is Iran an Ideological State?,” Atlantic Council, July 8, 2024
- “Factors Shaping Iran’s Current JCPOA Calculations,” Middle East Institute, July 11, 2022
- “The Role of Algorithms in the Persistent US-Iranian Impasse,” Middle East Institute, April 16, 2021
- “Iran Uninterrupted,” Carnegie Endowment for International Peace, June 8, 2021
- “Crises of Governance: The Continuing Middle Eastern Predicament,” in Rondo, III, Kyoto University, February 2021
- “Prospects for Change in Iranian Foreign Policy,” Carnegie Endowment for International Peace, (2018)
- “Iranian Authoritarianism During the Pahlavi Period (Farsi),” Third edition, 2020
- “Sources of Continuity In Iran’s Foreign Policy,” in Gulf Politics and Economics in a Changing World edited by Michael Hudson and Mimi Kirk (World Scientific Publishing Co., 2014)
- “Rationality and Iran’s National Development(Farsi),” seventeenth edition, 2022
- “Iranian Authoritarianism During the Qajar Period (Farsi), fourteenth edition,” 2022
- “Transition in the Middle East: New Arab Realities and Iran,” Middle East Policy, Spring 2013
- “The Evolution of State in Iran: A Political Culture Perspective,” Strategic Studies Center of Kuwait University, 2010
- “Iran’s Political Culture(Farsi), a field research in Farsi based on 900 questionnaires,” eighth edition, 2021
- “International Relations in Iran: Achievements and Limitations,” in International Relations Scholarship Around the World edited by Arlene Tickner and Ole Waever (Routledge, 2009) and “Iran in Search of Itself,” in Current History, December 2008.
- His political novel on post-revolutionary Iran, Battered Blossoms (in English) is in the final stage of completion.
- “Fundamentalism and Iranian Foreign Policy” Cambridge University Press book on Iran’s foreign policy.
