= New York Encounter =

The New York Encounter (abbreviated NYE) is an annual three-day event held in New York City in January, usually on Martin Luther King's weekend. It is a cultural event organized by members of the Catholic movement Communion and Liberation, consisting of keynote talks, panel discussions, exhibitions, and artistic performances. The first edition was held in January 2009. The event is modeled after the annual week-long Meeting for Friendship Amongst Peoples in Rimini, Italy, which attracts high-profile intellectuals, scientists, politicians, and religious figures from all over the world. The NYE is free to attend, open to the public, and organized with the help of many young adult volunteers from all over the United States and Canada.

== List of New York Encounters ==
The following is a list of the New York Encounter events since the inaugural one in 2009. The event was initially held in mid-January until 2019, when it began being held in mid-February.

Year	Dates	Theme
2009	January 17–18	
2010	January 16–18	
2011	January 14–17	
2012	January 13–15	
2013	January 18–20	Experiencing Freedom
2014	January 17–19	From "I" to "We"
2015	January 16–18	In Search of the Human Face
2016	January 15–17	Longing for the Sea and yet NOT Afraid
2017	January 13–15	Reality Has Never Betrayed Me
2018	January 12–14	An "Impossible" Unity
2019	February 15–17	Something to Start From
2020	February 14–16	Crossing the Divide
2021	February 12–14	When Reality Hits
2022	February 18–20	This Urge for the Truth
2023	February 17–19	Who am I that you care for me?
2024	February 16–18	Tearing Open the Sleeping Soul
