= Stefan Fröhlich (political scientist) =

German political scientist

- Born: 1958 (age 67–68); Bonn, North Rhine-Westphalia, Germany
- Occupations: Political scientist and professor

Stefan Fröhlich (born 1958 in Bonn, Germany) is a German political scientist and professor of International Relations at the Friedrich-Alexander-University Erlangen-Nuremberg. The emphasis in his work is on German foreign policy, transatlantic relations and US foreign policy, European foreign and security policy, and International Political Economy.

== Education and career ==
From 1979 to 1985 Fröhlich, studied political science, English studies, Hispanism, and economics in Bonn, Paris, Philadelphia and Washington D.C. Afterwards, he worked as a research associate for the German Bundestag till 1989 and as an assistant lecturer in the Institute for Political Science at the University of Bonn (1989–1994). After he completed his habilitation thesis in political science at Bonn University (1996), Fröhlich worked as a substitute professor at the University Trier. In 1997, he was an associate at the Deutschen Gesellschaft für Auswärtige Politik (German Society for Foreign Politics) and an associate professor at Bonn University. Subsequently, Fröhlich was program director of the post-graduate course of lectures "European Studies" at the Zentrum für Europäische Integrationsforschung (ZEI, Centre for European Integration Research) at the University of Bonn until 2002.

Since 1999, he has been a visiting professor in Antwerp, Bruges, Budapest, Bonn (ZEI), Milan, Birmingham, London, Vienna, Tübingen, Washington, and Moscow. Fröhlich has also been abroad for longer research periods at the Center for Transatlantic Relations at Johns Hopkins University in Washington D.C. (2002/03) and at the Woodrow Wilson Center, Washington D.C. (2007). Currently, Fröhlich is a visiting professor at the Collège d'Europe in Bruges and Natolin, at the Zentrum für Europäische Integrationsforschung (ZEI) in Bonn, and at the universities in Innsbruck and Zurich.

He is a frequent contributor to national and international print media, as well as a guest and analyst on German TV and radio.

Since 2003, Fröhlich has been Full Professor of international Relations at the University of Erlangen-Nuremberg.

== Memberships ==
- Directorate of the admission committee for German students at Bruges (European Movement International)
- Senior Fellow at Center for European Integration Studies, Bonn
- Deutsche Gesellschaft für Politikwissenschaft
- Deutsche Gesellschaft für auswärtige Politik (DGAP) (German Council on Foreign Relations)
- Arbeitskreis Europäische Integration
- Deutsche Atlantische Gesellschaft (board of directors)
- Advisory Board, the Harris German/Dartmouth Distinguished Visiting Professorship at Dartmouth College
- Advisory Board of Kölner Forums für Internationale Beziehungen und Sicherheitspolitik (KFIBS, Cologne Panel for International Relations and security policy)

== Publications (monographs) ==
- The New Geopolitics of Transatlantic Relations. Coordinated Responses to Common Dangers. Washington DC: Johns Hopkins University Press, 2012
- Zehn Jahre Deutschland in Afghanistan (Hrsg. mit Klaus Brummer). In: Zeitschrift für Außen- und Sicherheitspolitik, Sonderheft 3/2011
- Die EU als globaler Akteur. Lehrbuch, VS-Verlag, 2008
- Strategic Implications of Euro-Atlantic Enlargement (Hrsg. mit Esther Brimmer), Washington 2005
- The Difficulties of EU Governance: What way forward for the EU Institutions? Frankfurt a. M.: Peter Lang-Verlag, 2004
- Auf den Kanzler kommt es an. Außen- und Europapolitik in der Ära Kohl in den achtziger Jahren, Paderborn: Schöningh-Verlag, 2001
- Amerikanische Geopolitik. Von den Anfängen bis zum Ende des Zweiten Weltkrieges, Landsberg: Olzog Verlag, 1998
- Zwischen selektiver Verteidigung und globaler Eindämmung. Geostrategisches Denken in den USA während der Jahrzehnte des Kalten Krieges, Baden-Baden: Nomos 1998
- Die USA und die neue Weltordnung. Amerikanische Außenpolitik nach dem Ende des Kalten Krieges, Bonn/Berlin: Bouvier Verlag, 1992
- Nuclear Freeze Campaign. Die Kampagne für das Einfrieren der Nuklearwaffen unter der Reagan-Administration, Opladen: Leske und Budrich, 1990

== Publications (case studies) ==
- Future Perspectives for Transatlantic Relations. American Institute for Contemporary German Studies. Juni 2012
- Major tasks and the state of the art. The work of the EU Convention, Washington, SAIS 2004
- Globalization and the future of the transatlantic relations, Policy Paper, KAS, Berlin, März 2003
- Die GASP der EU: Entwicklungen und Perspektiven, ZEI/Discussion Paper, Dezember 2002
- Der Ausbau der Europäischen Verteidigungsidentität zwischen WEU und NATO. Zentrum für Europäische Integrationsforschung (ZEI), Discussion Paper, Bonn, Juli 1998
- Möglichkeiten amerikanisch-europäischer Kooperation: Der Aktionsplan zur Transatlantischen Agenda, Sankt Augustin 1997
- Fragen einer institutionellen Gestaltung der internationalen Ordnung. Zur aktuellen Theoriedebatte, Studie für den Bereich Forschung und Beratung der Konrad-Adenauer-Stiftung (KAS), Sankt Augustin 1996
