= Luigi Giussani =

Roman Catholic priest and educator (1922–2005)

Servant of God Luigi Giussani
- Luigi Giussani on the cover of the Traces Magazine in 2005
- Born: Luigi Giovanni Giussani; 15 October 1922; Desio, Italy
- Died: 22 February 2005 (aged 82); Milan, Italy

Luigi Giovanni Giussani (15 October 1922 – 22 February 2005) was an Italian Catholic priest, theologian, educator, public intellectual, and founder of the international Catholic movement Communion and Liberation. His canonization process was opened in 2012.

== Biography ==
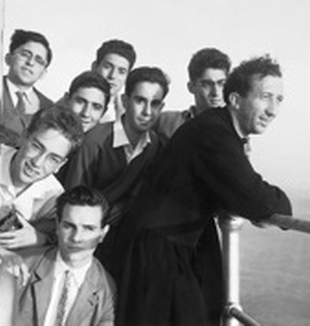
Father Luigi Giussani with some of his students from the Berchet high school on a trip to the Portofino Lighthouse.

Luigi Giussani was born on 15 October 1922 in Desio, near Milan, Italy. His father, Beniamino Giussani, was an artist and anarchist. His mother, Angelina Gelosa, worked in a textile factory and was a devout Catholic.

On 2 October 1933, he entered the diocesan seminary of Saint Peter Martyr Seveso, where he attended the first four years of school. As part of his studies, he learned how to understand "secular" works of art (such as the poetry of Giacomo Leopardi, and the music of Ludwig van Beethoven) as expressing a sense of spirituality and as unconscious prophecies of Christ's incarnation. With his fellow seminarians, including Enrico Manfredini (later Bishop of Piacenza) and Giacomo Biffi (later Archbishop of Bologna), Giussani founded a study group and newsletter named Studium Christi.

Giussani was ordained to the priesthood on 26 May 1945 at the young age of 22. His ordination had been accelerated by the authorities in the Milan archdiocese as they feared that his serious respiratory health problems (which would plague him his entire life) would lead to his death before becoming a priest. Following ordination, Giussani began teaching at the Venegono Seminary. His academic interests were Eastern Christian Theology and American Protestantism.

In the early 1950s, he requested of his superiors to be allowed to leave seminary teaching to work in high schools. He was driven by a desire to bring the Christian experience to the school environment in response to the questions of young people living in a context that he perceived to be increasingly hostile to both the Christian faith and the Catholic Church. He perceived a need to help young people to discover that real faith was relevant to one's life.

Beginning in 1954, he taught at the Berchet Lyceum (classical high school) in Milan until 1967. During this time his primary intellectual interest was the question of education; his involvement with the religious instruction of the students at Berchet was instrumental in the rapid growth of Gioventú Studentesca (GS, Student Youth), which at the time was a student wing of Azione Cattolica (Catholic Action). In the booklets Conquiste fondamentali per la vita e la presenza cristiana nel mondo (Fundamental Conquests for Christian Life and Presence in the World) (1954, co-authored with Fr. Costantino Oggioni) and L'esperienza (Experience) (1963), he outlined the fundamental ideas behind his approach to the formation of young people. His premise was that Faith is not just doctrines and moral laws, but an event; that Christ is the centre of everything; and that one comes to know Christ in the community of the Church.

In 1964 Giussani began teaching introductory theology at the Università Cattolica del Sacro Cuore in Milan, a position he occupied until 1990. In obedience to a request of his Archbishop, Giovanni Colombo, he left Gioventú Studentesca in 1965 and devoted himself to theological studies. In the late 1960s his superiors sent him on several periods of study in the US; during this time he wrote Grandi linee della teologia protestante americana. Profilo storico dalle origini agli anni 50 (An Outline of American Protestant Theology. An Historic Profile from the Origins to the 50s).

Pope John Paul II and Monsignor Giussani

In 1969 he returned to guide the former GS group, which had broken away from Azione Cattolica in the wake of the student rebellions that swept Europe following the events of May 1968. The rebellions were in opposition to the so-called "Svolta a sinistra" (Italian for "shift to left", meaning the endorsements of socialists and liberal positions) of the Italian Catholic associationism. Under the new name Comunione e Liberazione (Communion and Liberation), the movement Giussani founded attracted university students and adults in addition to high school students. Members of the movement, which Giussani led from 1969 until his death in 2005, became influential not only in the Church but also in politics and business.

In 1983 he was given the title of Monsignor by Pope John Paul II. He outlined his views on politics in an address to an assembly of the Italian Christian Democratic party at Assago on 6 February 1987.

== Ideas ==
One of Giussani's central themes is that Christian faith is, in its most primary and central form, a relationship. He emphasised that Christianity began as a relationship with a particular individual, Jesus of Nazareth, and that the morals and theology of the Church are an outgrowth of this relationship.

Giussani believed that one of the central problems for faith in the modern world is that it has been subject to various reductions. Some people experience faith as merely an empty formalism completely focused on following moral rules. There is no longer a living relationship with the person of God, but instead a ritualistic attempt to meet standards. Similarly, faith is sometimes reduced to intellectualism or an attempt to rationally defend certain doctrinal positions. Although morals and doctrine are both important they are not the central event of faith. The central reality of faith is a relationship with Christ as He becomes visible within reality.

Giussani also taught that the principal goal of a Christian life is to grow in maturity in the relationship with God. According to Giussani, this becomes possible when one sees all of reality as an incarnation of one's own individual relationship with God. Where some forms of Christianity attempt to grow in faith by emphasizing emotional intensity and sentiments (sentimentalism) and others by the rigours of moral perfectionism (moralism), he taught that maturity comes through a growing awareness that all of life's circumstances present an opportunity to better know God.

== Death ==
Giussani died on 22 February 2005 at the age of eighty-three. He was interred in Milan's Cimitero Monumentale.

Joseph Cardinal Ratzinger, (later Pope Benedict XVI), delivered the homily at his funeral, where he said of Giussani: "[H]e understood that Christianity is not an intellectual system, a packet of dogmas, a moralism; Christianity is rather an encounter, a love story; it is an event". Traces, the magazine of Communion and Liberation, published a retrospective issue on the life and work of Giussani in March 2005.

On 17 January 2006, the Holy See officially recognized Giussani as the co-founder, along with Fr. Étienne Pernet, A.A, of the Sisters of Charity of the Assumption, a community of religious women.

== Works ==
Giussani's writings have been translated into many different languages.

=== Books translated into English ===
==== PerCorso Trilogy ====
- The Religious Sense, McGill-Queen's University Press (1 October 1997). ISBN 0-7735-1626-3.
- At the Origin of the Christian Claim, McGill-Queen's University Press (1 January 1998). ISBN 0-7735-1627-1.
- Why the Church?, McGill-Queen's University Press (October 2000). ISBN 0-7735-1707-3.

==== Other works translated into English ====
- American Protestant Theology: A Historical Sketch. McGill-Queen's University Press (2013). ISBN 978-0773541979
- Morality: Memory and Desire Ignatius Press (1 November 1986) ISBN 0-89870-090-6
- He Is If He Changes 30Days (1994)
- Religious Awareness in Modern Man Communio 25, no. 1 (1998): 104-140.
- The Risk of Education Crossroad (15 August 2001) ISBN 0-8245-1899-3
- The Psalms Crossroad (June 2004) ISBN 0-8245-2124-2
- The Journey to Truth Is an Experience McGill-Queen's University Press (October 2006) ISBN 0-7735-3148-3
- Christ, God's Companionship with Man McGill-Queen's University Press (3 July 2015) ISBN 0-7735-4566-2

=== Selected online texts ===
- Luigi Giussani Works - Opera Omnia, in progress

==== Essays, book excerpts ====
- "The Kingdom of Caesar and Action" (1954)
- "Experience" (1963)
- "Simon, Do You Love Me?" (1998)
- "The Five Without" (1998)
- "Moved By The Infinite" (2003)
- "Faith Is Given Us That We Communicate It" (2004)

==== Speeches and addresses ====
- "From Utopia to Presence" (1976)
- "Religious Sense, Works and Politics" (1986)
- "Recognizing Christ" (1994)
- "In the Simplicity of my Heart I have gladly given You everything" (1998)
- "Woman, Do Not Weep!" (2002)

==== Interviews ====
- Fr. Giussani - Three Interviews (Retequattro) (Video)
- Excerpt from interview with Robi Ronza
- Interview with Renato Farina
