= Center for European Integration Studies =

Academic unit at the University of Bonn

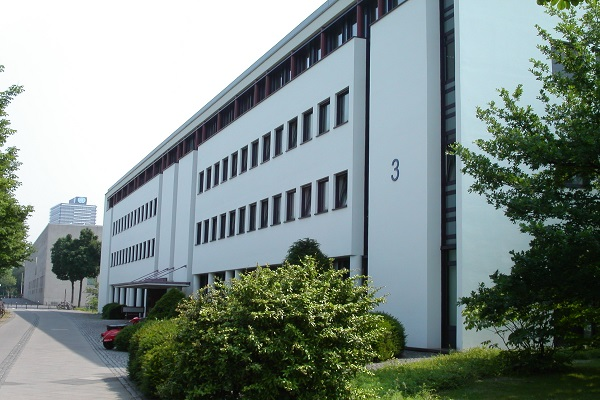
Center for European Integration Studies building in Bonn.

The Center for European Integration Studies (German: Zentrum für Europäische Integrationsforschung, ZEI) is a transdisciplinary research and post-graduate education institute at the University of Bonn. ZEI has participated in research, policy advice, and dialogue between science and practice since its establishment in 1995, with the current directors being Prof. Dr. Ludger Kühnhardt and Prof. Dr. Christian Koenig.

== History ==
The Berlin-Bonn Act of May 29, 1994, which deals with the consequence of the move of Germany’s national political institutions from Bonn to Berlin, provided for the establishment of a "Center for European Integration Studies” (ZEI) and a "Center for Development Research” (ZEF) as central scientific institution of the University of Bonn. On May 4, 1995, the Senate of the University of Bonn agreed to establish these two centers. The overall concept was formulated in consultation with the participating organs of the federal government and the state of North Rhine-Westphalia. It is based on an original proposal of the Senate of the University of Bonn from February 11, 1993. The Senate decision of May 4, 1995 is considered the founding date of the "Center for European Integration Studies" (ZEI) and the "Center for Development Research." The first Chairman of ZEI's international board was former German Foreign Minister Hans-Dietrich Genscher."

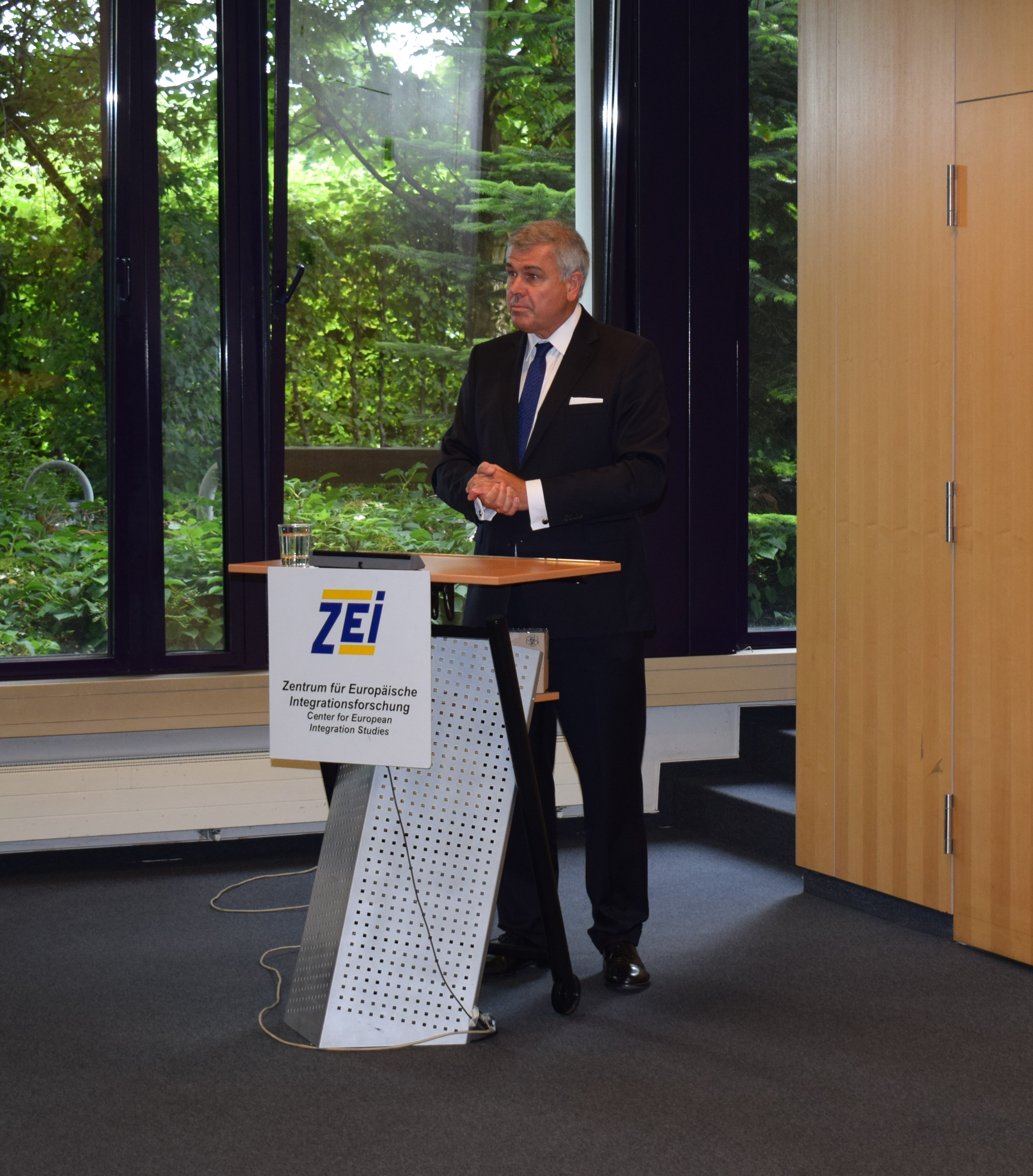
Director Ludger Kühnhardt speaking to a research conference at ZEI

== Publications ==
ZEI publishes ZEI Discussion Paper, Future of Europe Observer, and ZEI Insights. These publications deal with issues of governance and regulation in the European Union. The center also monitors the work of the European Union's institutions and publishes regular comments on progress or failure, including the ZEI Monitor.

Nomos Publishing House (Baden-Baden) publishes the Schriften des Zentrum für Europäische Integrationsforschung, edited by ZEI Director Prof. Dr. Ludger Kühnhardt. In the field of jurisprudence dealing with network industries, communications and the respective European regulation legislation, ZEI Director Prof. Dr. Christian Koenig is Managing Editor of the journal series Network Economics & Law with Law and Economics Publishing House (Frankfurt / Main). Communication & Law ("K & R") is also published by Law and Economics Publishing House (Frankfurt / Main).

== Academics ==
Since 1998, ZEI has offered a one-year post-graduate Master program taught in English, an interdisciplinary "Master of European Studies - Governance and Regulation".

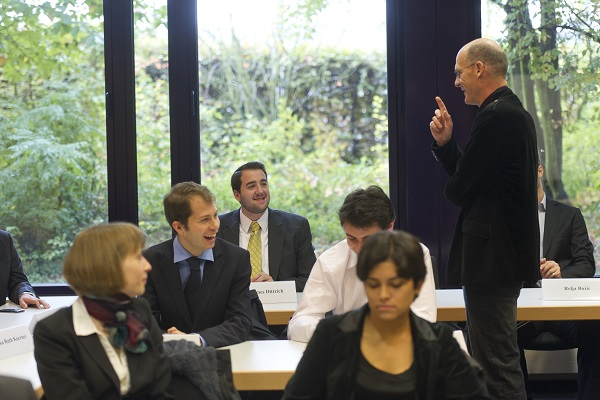
Director Christian Koenig teaching students of the Master of European Studies program

ZEI alumni also includes graduates from summer schools and the Master of European Regulation of Network Industries which were taught at ZEI in the past. The ZEI Academy in Comparative Regional Integration accompanied ZEI's research on global comparative regional integration studies.
