= Pio Fontana =

Swiss-Italian academic

- Born: 23 October 1927 (age 97); Balerna
- Died: 8 March 2001 (aged 73); Mendrisio
- Occupation(s): Professor of Italian Literature at University of St. Gallen and literary critic
- Known for: work on Ludovico Ariosto and modern Italian writers

Pio Fontana (23 October 1927 – 8 March 2001) was a Swiss teacher and writer.

== Personal life and education ==
Fontana was born in Balerna in Switzerland on 23 October 1927 to Demetrio and Maria (born Scanziani) Fontana. He attended the Catholic University of the Sacred Heart in Milan. His graduation thesis, supervised by Mario Apollonio, was on the subject of the sixteenth century Italian poet Ludovico Ariosto's Cinque Canti and it was published in 1962.

He died on 8 March 2001 in the city of Mendrisio.

== Career ==
He initially taught Italian literature at the Mendrisio gymnasium and was an assistant at the University of Milan. From 1963 until 1992 he was Professor of Italian literature at the University of St. Gallen. He was also a visiting professor at the University of Zurich and University of Basel.

In 1965 he published a Comment on Orlando Furioso, the most well-known work by Ludovico Ariosto. Fontana's literary criticism works also encompassed modern Italian authors such as Giovanni Verga, Riccardo Bacchelli, Cesare Pavese, Camillo Sbarbaro, Clemente Rebora, as well as the anti-Fascist Carlo Linati and the Italian-Swiss Francesco Chiesa and Giorgio Orelli.

His other most significant works were in 1968 Pavese and other essays, in 1974 Art and Myth of the Small Homeland and in 1985 Letters to Giovanni Castellano, 1908–1949.

He acted as a mentor for the Italian-Swiss poet Silvana Lattmann.
