= Communion and Liberation =

Lay Italian Catholic ecclesial movement

- Comunione e Liberazione
- Formation: 1954; 72 years ago
- Founder: Luigi Giussani
- Founded at: Milan, Italy
- Type: Catholic lay movement
- Location: Worldwide
- Leader: Luigi Giussani (1954–2005); Julián Carrón (2005–2021); Davide Prosperi (2021–present)
- Website: it.clonline.org

Communion and Liberation (Italian: Comunione e Liberazione, often shortened to CL), since 1980 officially Fraternity of Communion and Liberation (Italian: Fraternità di Comunione e Liberazione), is an international Catholic movement. It was founded in 1954 by Fr. Luigi Giussani as Student Youth (Gioventù Studentesca), with the aim of presenting the Christian event in a way which is in tune with contemporary culture, making it a source of new values for the modern world. The movement is in ninety countries on nearly every continent.

The name "Communion and Liberation" first appeared in 1969, and it synthesizes the conviction that the Christian event, lived in "communion" is the foundation of man's authentic "liberation".

== History ==
Communion and Liberation's origin is in the educational and catechetical methods of Luigi Giussani who in 1954, abandoned his teaching position at the Venegono seminary to teach Catholic religion at Berchet High School in Milan. Following daily encounters with his students, Giussani soon became an assistant to Catholic Action via the Gioventù Studentesca (Student Youth) branch. Within a few years, GS widely spread within and well beyond the Milanese diocese.

Though GS was part of Catholic Action, differences in approach caused internal tension and an eventual schism. In 1968, various members abandoned the group. The ones who remained faithful to Giussani organized themselves in what they eventually named "Communion and Liberation." The name was derived from a flyer distributed by some university students in 1969 with the aim to respond to the time's common mentality. While the world affirmed that man's freedom rested in revolution, they believed Christian communion was liberation.

Giussani said that he never planned to found a Catholic movement. In a letter to Pope John Paul II, he wrote, "Not only did I never intent to 'found' anything, but I believe that the genius of the movement whose birth I witnessed was the perceived urgency to proclaim the need to return to the elementary aspects of Christianity. That is a passion for the Christian fact as such, in its original elements. That's it." The pope was said to have been an ardent advocate of the movement, maintaining that it is a vanguard in "the work of overcoming the division between the Gospel and Culture". John Paul II also supported the work of the Italian politician Rocco Buttiglione, a member of the Communion and Liberation, particularly those that confirmed his European and American views. The pope's attitude was influenced by his papacy's focus on moral issues as well as the movement's anti-liberal orientation.

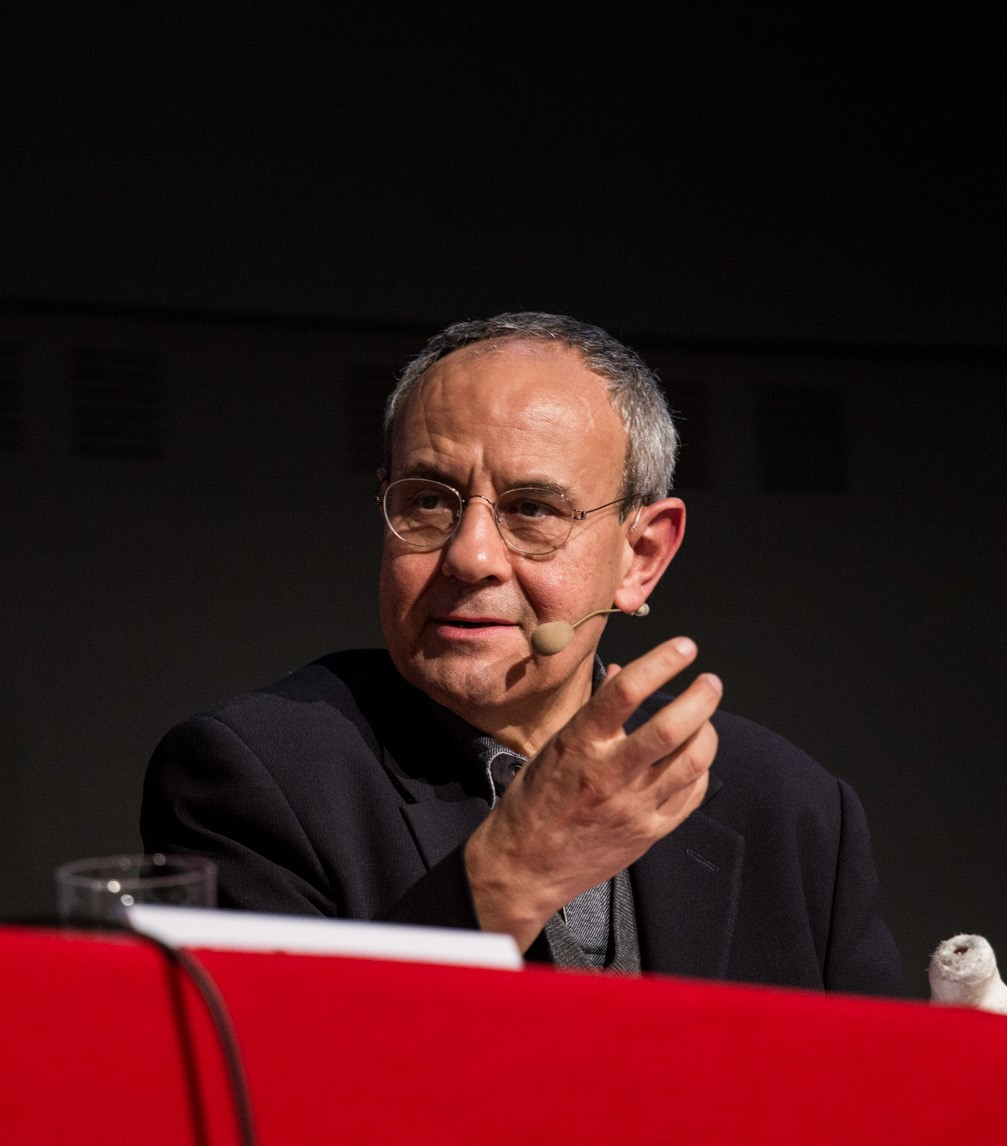
Julián Carrón, Padua 2016

Giussani's former high school and university students began to express their desire to live the experience of the movement in a more stable way. Their desire was fulfilled on February 11, 1982, when the Fraternity of Communion and Liberation was recognized by the Pontifical Council for the Laity as a lay association of pontifical rights.

After Giussani's death on February 22, 2005, responsibility over Communion and Liberation was passed on to Spanish priest and theologian Julián Carrón, who resigned in 2021 and was succeeded by Davide Prosperi.

== Lifestyle ==
The experience of life proposed by Communion and Liberation revolves around what Giussani considered to be the dimensions of Christian life: culture, charity, and mission. CL continues to be represented in secondary schools under the name of GS, while Communion and Liberation - University (CLU) informally encompasses the university students involved. Different forms of consecrated life are also present in the movement: Memores Domini, the Fraternity of St. Joseph, the Priestly Fraternity of St. Charles Borromeo, and the Sisters of Charity of the Assumption.

=== School of Community ===
A recurring activity in Communion and Liberation is catechesis through the School of Community (SoC), typically focusing on a text by Giussani or the Magisterium, organized by individual communities and open to the public.

Since the early stages of GS, Giussani had established his primary goals to be education to Christian maturity and collaboration in the mission of the Church in every aspect of life. The School of Community aims to be a method to verify the presence of Christ in one's life, delving into the relationship between faith and reason and, more specifically, how human reason can approach the mystery of God and the Incarnation. Participants help each other grow in awareness of how communion with Christ can give birth to a new humanity.

=== Prayer and the liturgy ===
Giussani always followed the Catholic Church's prayer and liturgy. He recommended the Liturgy of the Hours, in which Communion and Liberation pray in recto tono. In the early Seventies, a condensed version of the Ambrosian breviary was compiled; this version follows a weekly cycle rather than a four-week one and is still used today in Communion and Liberation communities. However, the consecrated religious within the movement used the official Catholic breviary for prayer. The rosary is recited frequently, and praying the Angelus, the Regina Coeli, and the Memorare is often encouraged, as is the use of the invocation to the Holy Spirit, Veni Sancte Spiritus, Veni per Mariam.

=== Culture ===
Giussani's desire to encourage readership of both Catholic and secular writers who could aid in further comprehension of the Christian experience led to the "Book of the Month," a series of texts regularly recommended by Communion and Liberation. Music proposals are instead compiled in the Spirito Gentil collection.

=== Charity ===
Members of Communion and Liberation are educated to charity through "charitable work," a recurring time to serve those in need. Charitable work might constitute activities such as assisting people who are elderly or disabled, tutoring immigrant children, or providing support for families in need.

=== Mission ===
The movement of Communion and Liberation is, in its essence, a missionary movement, meaning its adherents dedicate themselves to bringing the living presence of Christ to all men. Its consecrated men and women live out the missionary life as missionary priests and sisters.

=== Cultural and social presence ===
Communion and Liberation communities regularly engage in local cultural initiatives, occasionally giving life to events that have become popular in time. The largest and most famous of these cultural initiatives is the Meeting for Friendship Among Peoples, an international cultural festival that takes place annually in Rimini, Italy. Among other smaller recurring events inspired by the Rimini Meeting are the New York Encounter, Encuentro Madrid, Rhein Meeting, Meeting Lisboa, and the London Encounter.

The official magazine of Communion and Liberation is Traces, a monthly publication that is available in eleven languages, including English. Until the 1980s, Communion and Liberation's official publishing house was Jaca Book. Since then, publications tied to the movement have been published by various publishing houses, including Notre Dame Press, McGill-Queen's University Press, and RCS MediaGroup.

== Controversies ==
=== Corruption ===
Members of Communion and Liberation in positions of power in Italy have faced criticism for allegedly surrounding themselves with persons affiliated with Communion and Liberation or sympathizers, thus excluding individuals of different or opposing social, political, or religious views. Carrón responded to these widespread moral charges in an interview with the Italian newspaper Repubblica, in 2012. "It is a burning disappointment. The ideals of Communion and Liberation movement are far from the corruption surfacing in the Mafia Capitale investigations. And seeing that among those being investigated are people of the movement is cause of profound sadness for us." In December 2016, Roberto Formigoni, former governor of Lombardy and former unofficial Communion and Liberation political spokesperson, was sentenced to six years in prison for bribery and corruption after four years of investigations. In 2012, when Formigoni resigned as governor due to scandals, Carrón released an interview in which he stated, "There may have been people who used CL in a certain way ... we don't intervene in the documents or acts of those with political responsibilities. There are no CL candidates, there are no CL politicians. The sooner this is made clear, the better."

=== Sexual abuse ===
In 2016, Italian priest Mauro Inzoli, formerly of Communion and Liberation, was convicted of sexual abuse against five boys. Inzoli had been removed from the priesthood in 2012 by Pope Benedict XVI, but in 2014, he was reinstated by Pope Francis. This reinstatement was reversed following the 2016 conviction, and Inzoli has been permanently out of ministry since 2017.

On 31 October 2023, officials of CL's US branch announced they had confirmed multiple cases of sexual abuse between 1997 and 2018 on the part of Christopher Bacich, who led the US branch from 2007 to 2013. CL first learned of complaints about Bacich in 2018. He has denied any fault and resigned from the movement.
