= Orsolina Montevecchi =

Italian papyrologist

Orsolina Montevecchi (18 March 1911 – 1 February 2009) was an Italian papyrologist.

== Life and career ==
Montevecchi was born in Gambettola, Forlì-Cesena. She graduated from the Università Cattolica del Sacro Cuore with a thesis on sociological research in the papyri from Graeco-Roman Egypt. Since 1950, she has worked as a lecturer and then as a professor at the Università Cattolica del Sacro Cuore, where she spent the rest of her career. She was the author of numerous publications on the topic of Graeco-Roman Egypt, sociological studies in papyrology and provenance studies.

She was also the chief editor of Italian journal of Egyptology and papyrology, Aegyptus (1969–2002) and a member of the Association Internationale de Papyrologues (AIP). She died in Milan in 2009, aged 97.
