= Michele Norsa =

Italian business executive (born 1948)

- Born: August 12, 1948 (age 77); Italy
- Education: Università Cattolica del Sacro Cuore
- Occupation: Business executive
- Known for: Former General Director of Salvatore Ferragamo Italia S.p.A

Michele Norsa (born August 12, 1948) is an Italian business executive who has held various roles in the publishing and fashion industries. In October 2006, he became the Managing and General Director of Italian luxury goods company, Salvatore Ferragamo Italia S.p.A. He held this position for 10 years and left in 2016, however he was brought back again in 2020 to get the company profitable again after the COVID-19 pandemic and stayed until 2021.

== Early life and education ==
Norsa was born in Italy in 1948 and graduated with honors from Milan's Università Cattolica del Sacro Cuore in Business and Economics in 1971.

== Career ==
In his early career, he became the general director and managing director of Editorial Abril, in Buenos Aires, after having served in various other roles within the group in New York City and Geneva. In Arnoldo Mondadori Editore he was the Project Lead for General Development and Direction. From 1976 to 1985 he worked at Rizzoli in Milan as the director of the Rizzoli Group Book Area and as President of the publishing house Sansoni of Florence.

From 1994 to 1997 he worked in Treviso for Benetton Sportsystem Group as managing director of Sportsystem Active and President of Killer Loop. From 1985 to 1993 he worked in Sandys (Sergio Tacchini Group) and was managing director of the group. From 1997 to 2002 he worked in Marzotto S.p.A., where he had numerous roles: General Director Apparel Sector, President of Marzotto UsA and President of Marzotto France.

From 2002 he served as managing director of the Valentino Group and was later appointed as General Director. In the same period, 2002–2006, he covered the role of Vice President of the Executive Committee of Sistema Moda Italia.

He was appointed CEO and group managing director of Salvatore Ferragamo S.p.A. on 2 October 2006. He left the business in 2016, but was brought back in May 2020. In 2021 after returning the business to profitability after the COVID-19 pandemic he left this position again.

He also serves on the board of directors of Oettinger Davidoff Group and is a member of the International Advisory Board of the China Europe International Business School (CEIBS).
