= Julián Carrón =

Spanish priest

The Reverend Julián Carrón
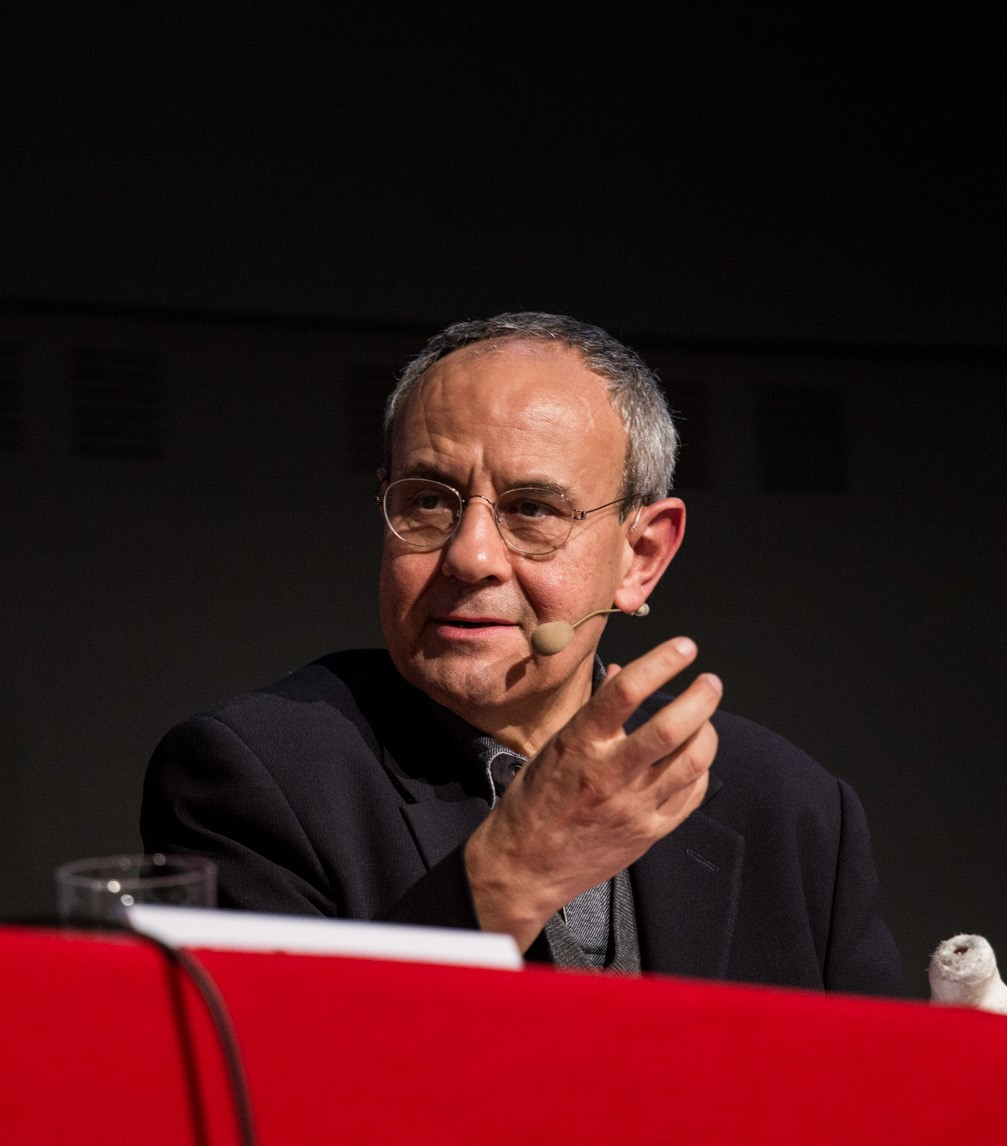
- Church: Catholic Church

Orders
- Ordination: 1975
- Rank: Priest

Personal details
- Born: 25 February 1950 (age 76) Navaconcejo, Spain
- Denomination: Catholic
- Residence: Milan, Italy
- Occupation: Leader of Communion and Liberation (2005–2021)
- Education: Comillas Pontifical University (Theology)

Julián Carrón (born 25 February 1950) is a Spanish Catholic priest, and theologian and the former leader of the Italian Communion and Liberation movement.
