= Graduate School of Economics and International Relations =

Graduate school of international relations and public policy in Milan, Italy

- Alta Scuola di Economia e Relazioni Internazionali
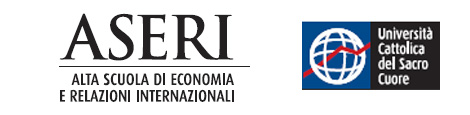
- Logo
- Other names: ASERI
- Type: Private graduate school
- Established: 1995
- Parent institution: Universita Cattolica del Sacro Cuore
- Director: Damiano Palano
- Location: Via San Vittore 18, 20123 Milan, Milan, Lombardy, Italy
- Campus: Urban
- Website: aseri.unicatt.it

The Graduate School of Economics and International Relations (Alta Scuola di Economia e Relazioni Internazionali, ASERI) is a graduate school in Milan, Italy, affiliated with the Universita Cattolica del Sacro Cuore. It provides postgraduate education and executive training in fields including international relations, international economics, public policy, diplomacy, and area studies, through master's programmes, short courses, and public events.

== History ==
=== Founding and early development ===
ASERI was founded in 1995 through cooperation between the Universita Cattolica del Sacro Cuore and the Milan Chamber of Commerce, in the context of the expansion of postgraduate training in international affairs and policy-related disciplines in Italy during the 1990s.

Institutional materials describe the school as building an alumni network exceeding 1,800 alumni in more than 80 countries.

=== Governance and leadership ===
According to ASERI, the school's governance includes a directorate and a management committee (comitato di gestione).

In November 2024, Damiano Palano was appointed director for the academic period 2024/25-2027/28, succeeding Vittorio Emanuele Parsi (director from 2012 to 2024). ASERI lists Lorenzo Ornaghi as honorary president (presidente onorario).

== Academics ==
=== Postgraduate programmes ===
ASERI's educational offer includes postgraduate master's programmes and other specialised training activities, complemented by seminars and public events.

ASERI publishes programme pages for its specialised master's courses, including:

- Master in Advanced Global Studies (MAGS), an English-language programme focused on global relations combining political, economic, and legal perspectives; the programme description highlights thematic areas such as security, humanitarian studies, sustainable development, migration, and environmental issues.
- Master in International Cooperation and Development (MICAD), a programme described as interdisciplinary and aimed at policy and operational approaches to global inequality, poverty, instability, and conflict. The programme indicates an initial classroom phase at ASERI followed by an internship and a final project work component, and also describes an internship requirement of at least three months (Italy or abroad).
- Master in Middle Eastern Studies (MIMES), a programme presented as an area-studies course addressing the Middle East from historical, political, economic, and social perspectives; the programme also describes coverage across multiple sub-regions (e.g., Maghreb, Levant, Gulf, and Southern Asia) with a comparative approach.
- Master in Advanced Public and Cultural Diplomacy for International Relations (MAPCD), a programme described as focused on public and cultural diplomacy. Programme materials state that the course takes place at the Rome campus of the Universita Cattolica del Sacro Cuore.

=== International and double-degree initiatives ===
A central component of ASERI's international academic offer is the double-degree programme Master in Economics and International Policies (MEPIN), jointly delivered with the USI University in Switzerland.

The programme extends over two academic years (four semesters) and is divided between the two institutions, with students completing coursework in both Milan and Switzerland within a fully integrated binational academic structure.

Admission is limited to a maximum of 35 students per academic year and is based on a formal selection procedure conducted by the partner institutions.

The curriculum combines advanced training in economics, quantitative methods, and international political economy with an internship component and a final thesis developed across both institutions, reflecting the programme's selective cohort model and cross-border academic design.

=== Research, publications and public engagement ===
In addition to teaching, ASERI promotes public debate on international affairs through events and recurring publications; ASERI publishes issues of ASERInforma on its website.

Coverage of the school's 30th-anniversary initiatives describes multi-day public programming involving faculty, visiting speakers and alumni, hosted at the Via San Vittore site.

== Campus ==
=== Location ===
ASERI's offices and teaching activities are based at Via San Vittore 18, 20123 Milan, and the school publishes guidance on how to reach the site by public transportation.

Institutional communications describing the 30th anniversary also locate the school in the historic villini of Via San Vittore 18, used as venues for teaching and public events.

== Notable academics ==
ASERI lists Damiano Palano as director and Lorenzo Ornaghi as honorary president (presidente onorario) and includes them in its governance and staff pages.

ASERI's institutional communications and anniversary programme have featured contributions by academics including Michael Cox and John Ikenberry.

== See also ==
- International relations
- Public policy
- Graduate school
