= Agostino Pertusi =

Italian classical philologist (1918–1979)

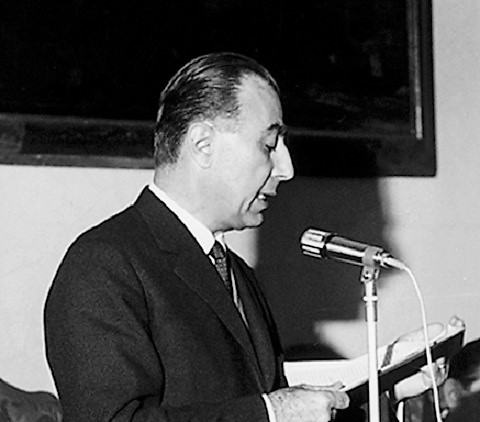
- Born: April 19, 1918; Piacenza, Lombardy, Kingdom of Italy
- Died: January 25, 1979 (aged 60); Milan, Lombardy, Italy
- Occupation: University professor

Academic background
- Education: Università Cattolica (Milan); Université libre de Bruxelles
- Alma mater: Università Cattolica (Milan)
- Thesis: Le traduzioni dal latino nella cultura bizantina dal concilio di Efeso (431) all’epoca dei Paleologi (1941)
- Doctoral advisor: Raffaele Cantarella
- Other advisor: Henri Grégoire

Academic work
- Discipline: Classics
- Sub-discipline: Byzantine studies • Renaissance studies
- Institutions: Università Cattolica (Milan)

Agostino Pertusi (19 April 1918 – 25 January 1979) was an Italian Classical scholar and Byzantinist, Professor in Byzantine studies at the Università Cattolica del Sacro Cuore in Milan.

== Biography ==
Pertusi was born in Piacenza from Ugo and Giovanna Pertusi (née Bossoli). His early interest in literature and art was influenced by his family environment — for example, his maternal grandfather, Gaetano, was a violinist who played with Giuseppe Verdi. The Pertusis moved to Milan in 1921. Here he attended the Barnabite Liceo classico "San Zaccaria" (1932–1937) and later enrolled at the Università Cattolica (1937–1941). A student of Raffaele Cantarella, he graduated submitting a dissertation in Byzantine studies. He served in the Royal Italian Army from 1941 until the fall of the Fascist regime (25 July 1943), which saved him from being drafted and serving on the Eastern Front.

From 1945 he was research assistant at the Università Cattolica. In 1949 he was habilitated to teaching at the Liceo classico in Macerata and won a scholarship to be spent in a foreign university, choosing the Université libre de Bruxelles where he attended classes in Byzantine studies taught by Henri Grégoire. In 1952 he became lecturer in Greek literature at the Università Cattolica, in 1954 he was habilitated to university teaching and assigned to teach Byzantine studies. In 1955 he became "professore straordinario", being promoted to full professorship in 1958, in Byzantine studies, also teaching Greek literature as substitute professor starting from 1957. In 1973 he moved to the chair of Greek literature.

In more than a quarter of century, he held classes in Ancient Greek literature discussing Euripides, Aristophanes, Menander, Callimachus, Apollonius of Rhodes, the Greek novel.

From 1968 to 1971 he served as Dean of the Faculty of Humanities. In 1971 he was nominated Director of the Department of Classics. Outside his university, in 1963 he started collaborating with the Cini Foundation in Venice, in the framework of which he directed the research institute "Venezia e l'Oriente" and founded the byzantine branch of the institute's library. From 1964 he was editor of the scientific journal "Bollettino dell'Istituto di Storia e Società dello Stato Veneziano", which became "Studi veneziani" (published by Leo S. Olschki) in 1965. In 1964 he was also nominated Director of the Istituto di Storia della Società e dello Stato Veneziano. He was a member of the scientific boards of both the Centro Italiano di Studi sull'Alto Medioevo (CISAM, Spoleto) and the Istituto Storico Italiano per il Medio Evo (ISIME, Rome). He was one of the founders of the Italian series of the Corpus Scriptorum Historiae Byzantinae and designed the frontispiece of the series.

He married art historian Franca Pucci, whom he had met in Macerata, in 1954. The couple had three daughters. He died in Milan in 1979, from lung cancer.

== Research activity ==
Pertusi wrote his dissertation on the translation activity from Latin to Greek in Byzantine culture, from the Council of Ephesus (341) to the Palaeologan dinasty (XIII cen.). His interest for the mutual relationships between the East and the West in Middle Ages continued all throughout his career, and concretised in some studies on the reception of Ambrose and Boethius in Byzantium and in a paper on a previously unknown Latin version of the Odyssey. At the time of his graduation, he already had a significant experience in manuscript studies, and had compiled an handwritten repertoire of catalogues of Greek manuscripts which he used to correct and integrate the one published by Marcel Richard.

On another hand, Pertusi studied the textual transmission of classical texts in Byzantium and the reception in the Renaissance, focusing on Euripides and Hesiod. He studied the textual transmission of the scholia to Hesiod's Works and Days, with focus on specific manuscripts, on the circle of Maximus Planudes and on Proclus' lost commentary, and published the critical edition of the scholia vetera. His student Lamberto Di Gregorio continued his researches and published the scholia vetera to the Theogony.

Pertusi's interest in Ancient Greek theater was influenced by his doctoral advisor Cantarella. Regarding Euripides, Pertusi made him one of his most continuous research topics. He not only investigated the plays as literary products of their time and their reception in antiquity, but also studied his textual transmission and reception in Renaissance and their influence on Italian and Turkish literature.

In the framework of his managerial roles in the Cini Foundation, he organized a series of international congresses focused on the Byzantine-Venetian relations and the history of Byzantine spirituality, including a celebration of the millenary of the Mount Athos (1963). In 1965 he collaborated with other scholars, including Bernhard Bischoff, to an extended study of the Pala d'Oro of the Basilica di San Marco.

In the framework of his interest in medieval history and Byzantine politics, Pertusi studied the Byzantine themata and published a critical edition of the treatise on the subject by Constantine VII Porpyrogenitus. He also encouraged and promoted the same line of research in his students.

== Publications ==
Full lists of publications in Faraggiana di Sarzana & Mazzucchi 1982, pp. 403–420, Carile 1981–1984, vol. III, pp. XV–XXX, Follieri 1994. Journals are listed according to the sigla established by L'Année philologique, with the addition of "BISIME-AM" = "Bullettino dell'Istituto Storico Italiano per il Medio Evo e Archivio Muratoriano" (Rome: ISIME).

=== Books ===
- Pertusi, A. (1937–1941). Repertorio di cataloghi a stampa di manoscritti greci. pro manuscripto.
- Pertusi, A. (1940–1941). Le traduzioni dal latino nella cultura bizantina dal concilio di Efeso (431) all'epoca dei Paleologi. Tesi di laurea. Advised by Raffaele Cantarella. Milan: Università Cattolica del Sacro Cuore.
- Porphyrogenitus, C. (1952). Pertusi, A. (ed.). De thematibus. Studi e Testi, 160. Vatican City: Biblioteca Apostolica Vaticana. ISBN 8821004457 – via Torrossa.
- Pertusi, A., ed. (1953). Scholia vetera in Hesiodi Opera et Dies. Pubblicazioni dell'Università Cattolica — N.S., 13. Milan: Vita e Pensiero.
- Pisides, G. (1959). Pertusi, A. (ed.). Poemi. Studia Patristica & Byzantina, 7. Vol. I. Panegirici epici. Ettal: Buch-Kunstverlag.
- Pertusi, A., ed. (1964). La storiografia veneziana fino al secolo XVI. Aspetti e problemi. Civiltà veneziana. Saggi, 18. Florence: Leo S. Olschki. ISBN 9788822211682.
- Pertusi, A. (1964). Leonzio Pilato fra Petrarca e Boccaccio. Civiltà veneziana. Studi, 16. Florence: Leo S. Olschki. ISBN 9788822228116.
- Bischoff, B.; Fiocco, G.; Hahnloser, H. R.; Pertusi, A.; Volbach, W. F. (1965). Hahnloser, H. R. (ed.). Il tesoro di S. Marco. Vol. II. La pala d'oro. Florence: Sansoni.
- Pertusi, A., ed. (1966). Venezia e l'Oriente fra Tardo Medioevo e Rinascimento. Florence: Sansoni.
- Pertusi, A., ed. (1973). Venezia e il Levante fino al secolo XV. Atti del I Convegno internazionale di storia della civiltà veneziana (Venezia, 1-5 giugno 1968). Civiltà veneziana. Studi, 27/1. Vol. I. Storia – Diritto – Economia. Florence: Leo S. Olschki. ISBN 9788822214362.
- Pertusi, A., ed. (1974). Venezia e il Levante fino al secolo XV. Atti del I Convegno internazionale di storia della civiltà veneziana (Venezia, 1-5 giugno 1968). Civiltà veneziana. Studi, 27/2. Vol. II. Arte – Letteratura – Linguistica. Florence: Leo S. Olschki. ISBN 9788822213532.
- Pertusi, A., ed. (1976a). La caduta di Costantinopoli. Scrittori greci e latini. Vol. I. Le testimonianze dei contemporanei. Milan – Rome: Fondazione Lorenzo Valla. ISBN 9788804134312.
- Pertusi, A., ed. (1976b). La caduta di Costantinopoli. Scrittori greci e latini. Vol. II. L'eco nel mondo. Milan – Rome: Fondazione Lorenzo Valla. ISBN 9788804134329.
- Beck, H. G.; Manoussacas, M.; Pertusi, A., eds. (1977). Venezia centro di mediazione fra Oriente e Occidente (secoli XV-XVI). Aspetti e problemi. Atti del II Convegno internazionale di storia della civiltà veneziana (Venezia, 3-6 ottobre 1963). Civiltà veneziana. Studi, 32. Florence: Leo S. Olschki. ISBN 9788822214164.
- Pertusi, A. (†) (1981). Faraggiana di Sarzana, C. (ed.). Martino Segono di Novi Brado, vescovo di Dulcigno. Un umanista serbo-dalmata del tardo Quattrocento. Vita e opere. Studi storici, 128–130. Roma: Istituto Storico Italiano per il Medio Evo.
- Pertusi, A. (†); Carile, A. R., eds. (1983). Testi inediti e poco noti sulla caduta di Costantinopoli. Bologna: Patron.
- Pertusi, A. (†); Carile, A. R., eds. (1990). Il pensiero politico bizantino. Bologna: Patron.
- Pertusi, A. (†) (1990). Parente, G. B. (ed.). Saggi veneto-bizantini. Fondazione Giorgio Cini — Civiltà veneziana. Saggi, 37. Firenze: Leo S. Olschki. ISBN 9788822237743. (Kleine Schriften).
- Pertusi, A. (†) (1994). Follieri, E. (ed.). Scritti sulla Calabria greca e medievale. Soveria Mannelli: Rubbettino. ISBN 8872843227. (Kleine Schriften).
- Pertusi, A. (†) (2004). Mazzucchi, C. M. (ed.). Bisanzio e i Turchi nella cultura del Rinascimento e del Barocco: tre saggi di Agostino Pertusi. Bibliotheca erudita, 25. Milan: Vita e Pensiero. ISBN 9788834311790. (Kleine Schriften).

=== Articles ===
- Pertusi, A. (1944). "Le antiche traduzioni greche delle opere di s. Ambrogio e l'Expositio fidei a lui falsamente attribuita". Aevum. 18 (1–4): 184–207. JSTOR 25819534.
- Pertusi, A. (1947). "Ritorno alla tragedia greca?". Dioniso. N. S. 10: 210–222.
- Pertusi, A. (1950a). "Intorno alla tradizione manoscritta degli scolî di Proclo ad Esiodo: I. Il cod. Vat. gr. 38 ed il cod. Marc. gr. IX 6". Aevum. 24 (1): 10–26. JSTOR 25820088.
- Pertusi, A. (1950b). "Intorno alla tradizione manoscritta degli scolî di Proclo ad Esiodo: II. Il cod. Paris. gr. 2771 (A)". Aevum. 24 (6): 528–544. JSTOR 25820170.
- Pertusi, A. (1950c). "Aggiunte e correzioni al Répertoire des bibliothèques et des catalogues de manuscrits grecs di M. Richard". Aevum. 24 (2): 196–209. JSTOR 25820119.
- Pertusi, A. (1951a). "Gli studi latini di Manuele Caleca e le traduzioni del De Trinitate di Boezio". Miscellanea Giovanni Galbiati. Fontes Ambrosiani, 27. Vol. III. Milan: Hoepli. pp. 283–312.
- Pertusi, A. (1951b). "Intorno alla tradizione manoscritta degli scolî di Proclo ad Esiodo: III. Il cod. Vat. gr. 904 (Q)". Aevum. 25 (1): 20–28. JSTOR 25820183.
- Pertusi, A. (1951c). "Intorno alla tradizione manoscritta degli scolî di Proclo ad Esiodo: IV. Proclo e non Proclo (1.—2.)". Aevum. 25 (2): 147–159. JSTOR 25820205.
- Pertusi, A. (1951d). "Intorno alla tradizione manoscritta degli scolî di Proclo ad Esiodo: IV. Proclo e non Proclo (3.)". Aevum. 25 (3): 267–278. JSTOR 25820226.
- Pertusi, A. (1951e). "Intorno alla tradizione manoscritta degli scolii di Proclo ad Esiodo: V. Scolii planudei planudei e bizantini inediti alle «Opere»". Aevum. 25 (3): 342–352. JSTOR 25820240.
- Pertusi, A. (1951f). "La fortuna di Boezio a Bisanzio". Παγκράτεια. Mélanges H. Grégoire. Annuaire de l'Institut de Philologie et d'Histoire Orientales et Slaves, 11. Vol. III. Bruxelles: Éditions de l'Institut. pp. 301–322.
- Pertusi, A. (1952a). "Il contributo scolii di Proclo al testo de "Le Opere e i Giorni"". Aevum. 26 (3): 197–227. JSTOR 25820350.
- Pertusi, A. (1952b). "Il significato della trilogia troiana di Euripide". Dioniso. N. S. 15: 251–273.
- Pertusi, A. (1952c). "Intorno alla tradizione manoscritta degli scolii di Proclo ad Esiodo: VI. Il cod. Genav. 45 (Γ) e la classe b". Aevum. 26 (2): 131–146. JSTOR 25820330.
- Pertusi, A. (1953a). "Euripide e Saffo". PP. 8: 376–380.
- Pertusi, A. (1953b). "La tradizione manoscritta degli scolii alle Opere e i Giorni e le note inedite attribuite a Massimo Planude". Atti dello VIII Congresso Nazionale di Studi Bizantini. Studi Bizantini e Neoellenici, 7. Vol. I. Roma: Associazione Nazionale per gli Studi Bizantini. pp. 177–182.
- Pertusi, A. (1953c). "Menandro ed Euripide". Dioniso. N. S. 16: 27–63.
- Cantarella, R.; Pertusi, A. (1953b). "Per l'adozione di norme generali per la descrizione dei codici greci". Atti dello VIII Congresso Nazionale di Studi Bizantini. Studi Bizantini e Neoellenici, 7. Vol. I. Roma: Associazione Nazionale per gli Studi Bizantini. pp. 3–5.
- Pertusi, A. (1954). "Nuova ipotesi sull'origine dei «temi» bizantini". Aevum. 28 (2): 126–150. JSTOR 25820545.
- Pertusi, A. (1956a). "Selezione teatrale e scelta erudita nella tradizione del testo di Euripide (I)". Dioniso. N. S. 19: 111–141.
- Pertusi, A. (1956b). "Selezione teatrale e scelta erudita nella tradizione del testo di Euripide (II)". Dioniso. N. S. 19: 195–216.
- Pertusi, A. (1957). "Selezione teatrale e scelta erudita nella tradizione del testo di Euripide (III)". Dioniso. N. S. 20: 18–37.
- Pertusi, A. (1958a). "Di alcune traduzioni greche di inni attribuiti a s. Tomaso e s. Ambrogio". BBGG. N. S. 12: 141–150.
- Pertusi, A. (1958b). "L'encomio di sant'Anastasio, martire persiano". AB. 76: 5–63.
- Pertusi, A. (1959). "Τὰ δράματα μὲ βυζαντινὴ καὶ τουρκικὴ ὑπόθεση στὸ εὐρωπαϊκὸ καὶ βενετικὸ θέατρο ἀπὸ τὸ τέλος τοῦ 16ου ὡς τὲς ἀρχὲς τοῦ 18ου αἰῶνα". Ἑλληνικά. 22: 341–368.
- Pertusi, A. (1960). "La scoperta di Euripide nel primo Umanesimo". IMU. 3: 101–152.
- Pertusi, A.; Franceschini, E. (1959). "Un'ignota Odissea latina dell'ultimo Trecento". Aevum. 33 (4): 323–355. JSTOR 20859244.
- Pertusi, A. (1963). "Il ritorno alle fonti del teatro greco classico. Euripide nell'Umanesimo e nel Rinascimento". Byzantion. 33: 391–426.
- Pertusi, A. (1965–1966a). "Bisanzio e le insegne regali dei dogi di Venezia". RSBN. 2–3: 277–284.
- Pertusi, A. (1965–1966b). "Presentazione dell'Istituto Venezia e l'Oriente". RSBN. 2–3: 323–326.
- Pertusi, A. (1968a). "I principi fondamentali della concezione del potere a Bisanzio. Per un commento al dialogo «Sulla scienza politica» attribuito a Pietro Patrizio (secolo VI)". BISIME-AM. 80: 1–23.
- Pertusi, A. (1968b). "In margine alla questione dell'umanesimo bizantino: il pensiero politico del cardinal Bessarione e i suoi rapporti con il pensiero di Giorgio Gemisto Pletone". RSBN. 5: 95–104.
- Pertusi, A. (1968c). "Stato dei lavori della commissione per l'edizione del Corpus Fontium Historiae Byzantinae". RSBN. 5: 177–190.
- Pertusi, A. (1970). "Storia bizantina e storiografia italiana (1945–1966)". La storiografia italiana negli ultimi venti anni. Atti del I congresso nazionale di scienze storiche, Perugia, 9–13 ottobre 1967. Vol. II. Milan: Marzorati. pp. 925–986.
- Pertusi, A. (1972). "Umanità di un maestro: testimonianza su Raffaele Cantarella". Rassegna Pugliese. 7: 481–486.
- Pertusi, A. (1978). "Ai confini tra religione e politica. La contesa per le reliquie di S. Nicola tra Bari, Venezia e Genova". Quaderni Medievali. 3: 5–56.

== Fellowships and honors ==
See Carile 1980–1982, p. 328. If no end date is specified, Pertusi held the fellowship or the role to his death.

- Accademia Tudertina (Todi) — Centro di Studi sulla Spiritualità Medievale (1968, representing ISIME).
- Association Internationale des Études Byzantines (general secretary: 1971–1976; vice-president: 1976)
- Association Internationale des Études du Sud-Est Européen (vice-president: 1969)
- Associazione Italiana di Studi del Sud Est Europeo (Venice) (general secretary: 1969)
- Centro Italiano di Studi sull'Alto Medioevo (CISAM) (associated: 1968–1969; member of the board of directors: 1969)
- Istituto Lombardo Accademia di Scienze e Lettere (corresponding fellow: 1964)
- Istituto Storico Italiano per il Medio Evo (ISIME) (associated: 1968–1970; full membership of the board of directors: 1970)
- Ministero della Pubblica Istruzione — Medaglia d'oro per i benemeriti della scuola, della cultura e dell'arte (1966)

== Gedenkschriften and posthumous honors ==
Pertusi's premature death was met with mourning in Italian academia, particularly in the field of Byzantine studies. His colleagues Adriano Bausola — then Head of the Faculty of Humanities of the Università Cattolica — and Ezio Franceschini — formerly Chancellor of the same university — announced Pertusi's death, and so did Pertusi's students Antonio Carile (then-professor of Byzantine history at the University of Bologna) and Carlo Maria Mazzucchi. The following is a list of Pertusi's obituaries, in chronological order:

- Athanasiadis Novas 1979
- Bausola 1979
- Corsi & Musca 1979
- De Cesare 1979
- Franceschini 1979
- Mazzucchi 1979
- Notara 1979
- Zakynthinos 1979
- Carile 1980, 1980–1982, 1983, 2017
- Follieri 1986

Two Gedenkschriften were edited immediately after his passing, one promoted and edited by Carile, the other by his students and successors at the Università Cattolica, Chiara Faraggiana di Sarzana and Mazzucchi. In 1989, a congress in his memory was organised in Bologna, with the proceedings published two years later. In 2015, an entry about Pertusi was printed in the 82nd volume of the Dizionario Biografico degli Italiani.

== Bibliography ==
- Athanasiadis Novas, G. (1979). "Μνήμη Agostino Pertusi (1918–1979)". Πρακτικὰ τῆς Ἀκαδεμίας Ἀθηνῶν: 57–58.
- Bausola, A. (1979). "Agostino Pertusi (1918–1979)". Presenza dell'Università Cattolica del Sacro Cuore. 11 (2): 33.
- Bernardinello, S. P. (2017). "[Review of] A. [Meschini] Pontani, "Da Bisanzio all'Italia: a proposito di un libro recente." Thesaurismata 25 (1995) 83–123". Scriprotium. 71 (1): 78*–79* – via Persée.
- Carile, A. R. (1980). "Agostino Pertusi". Medioevo. Saggi e Rassegne. 5: 211–229.
- Carile, A. R. (1980–1982). "Agostino Pertusi (1918–1979): ritratto di un maestro". RSBN. 17–18–19: 323–350.
- Carile, A. R., ed. (1981–1984). Miscellanea Agostino Pertusi. Rivista di Studi Bizantini e Slavi, 1–3. Vol. I–III. Bologna: Patron.
- Carile, A. R. (1983). "Commemorazione di Agostino Pertusi". In Leone, P. L. M. (ed.). Studi Bizantini e Neogreci. Atti del IV Congresso Nazionale di Studi Bizantini (Lecce, 21–23 aprile 1980; Calimera, 24 aprile 1980). Collana dell'Università degli Studi di Lecce. Facoltà di Lettere e filosofia. Istituto di Storia Medievale e moderna — Saggi e Ricerche, 3. Galatina: Congedo. pp. 25–41. ISBN 8877862203.
- Carile, A. R. (1990). "Introduzione a Agostino Pertusi". Pertusi 1990, pp. V–VIII.
- Carile, A. R. (2015). "Pertusi, Agostino". Dizionario Biografico degli Italiani. Vol. 82. Rome: Istituto dell'Enciclopedia Italiana Treccani.
- Carile, A. R. (2017) [1983]. "Pertusi, Agostino". Temi e problemi nella mistica femminile trecentesca. Atti del XX convegno storico internazionale, Todi, 17-19 ottobre 1979. Atti dei Convegni del Centro di Studi sul Basso Medioevo, 20. Spoleto: Fondazione CISAM. pp. 11–46. ISBN 978-88-6809-220-7.
- Corsi, P.; Musca, G. (1979). "Ricordo di Agostino Pertusi". Quaderni Medievali. 7: 5–12.
- De Cesare, R. (1979). "In memoria di Agostino Pertusi". Aevum. 53 (1): 3–4. JSTOR 25821868.
- Di Gregorio, L. (1963). "Su alcuni frammenti delle Storie Babilonesi di Giamblico". Aevum. 37 (5–6): 390–405. JSTOR 20859655.
- Di Gregorio, L. (1964). "Sulla biografia di Giamblico e la fortuna del suo romanzo attraverso i secoli". Aevum. 38 (1–2): 1–13. JSTOR 20859687.
- Di Gregorio, L. (1968). "Sugli «Ἅπιστα ὑπὲρ Θούλης» di Antonio Diogene". Aevum. 42 (3–4): 199–211. JSTOR 25820708.
- Di Gregorio, L. (1971a). "Sulla tradizione degli scholia vetera alla Teogonia di Esiodo: I. Le copie del Marc. gr. 464 (= 762)". Aevum. 45 (1–2): 1–24. JSTOR 25821002.
- Di Gregorio, L. (1971b). "Sulla tradizione degli scholia vetera alla Teogonia di Esiodo: II. La famiglia del Vat. gr. 1332". Aevum. 45 (3–4): 187–207. JSTOR 25821029.
- Di Gregorio, L. (1971c). "Sulla tradizione degli scholia vetera alla Teogonia di Esiodo: III. I codici contaminati". Aevum. 45 (5–6): 383–408. JSTOR 25821047.
- Di Gregorio, L. (1972). "Sulla tradizione degli scholia vetera alla Teogonia di Esiodo: IV. Conclusioni". Aevum. 46 (1–2): 1–15. JSTOR 25821065.
- Di Gregorio, L., ed. (1975). Scholia vetera in Hesiodi Theogoniam. Scienze filologiche e letteratura, 6. Milan: Vita e Pensiero – via Internet Archive.
- Faraggiana di Sarzana, C.; Mazzucchi, C. M., eds. (1982). Bisanzio e l'Italia. Raccolta di studi in memoria di Agostino Pertusi. Scienze filologiche e letteratura, 22. Milan: Vita e Pensiero.
- Follieri, E. (1986). "In memoria di Agostino Pertusi". In Follieri, E. (ed.). Calabria bizantina. Istituzioni civili e topografia storica. Rome – Reggio Calabria: Gangemi. pp. 5–10. ISBN 9788890013843.
- Follieri, E. "Bibliografia di Agostino Pertusi". In Pertusi (1994), pp. VI–XIX.
- Follieri, E. (1997). "La filologia bizantina in Italia nel secolo XX". In Acconcia Longo, A.; Perria, L.; Luzzi, A. (eds.). Byzantina et Italograeca. Studi di filologia e di paleografia. Raccolta di Studi e Testi, 195. Rome: Edizioni di Storia e Letteratura. pp. 3–39. ISBN 9788890013843.
- Franceschini, E. (1979). "Agostino Pertusi (1918–1979)". Presenza dell'Università Cattolica del Sacro Cuore. 11 (1): 26.
- Notara, A. (1979). "Ricordo di un maestro". Presenza dell'Università Cattolica del Sacro Cuore. 11 (2): 27–28.
- Mazzucchi, C. M. (1979). "Agostino Pertusi (1918–1979)". Aegyptus. 59 (1–2): 265–267. JSTOR 41216523.
- Mazzucchi, C. M., ed. (2002). Menae patricii cum Thoma Referendario De scientia politica dialogus. Bibliotheca erudita, 17 (2nd ed.). Milan: Vita & Pensiero. ISBN 9788834305805.
- Parmeggiani, A., ed. (1991). Agostino Pertusi 1979-1989: l'opera storiografica e filologica. Bologna, 11 aprile 1989. Atti del convegno. Rivista di Bizantinistica, 1/1 (Rivista di Studi Bizantini e Slavi, 6). Milan: CUSL.
- Porro, A. (2025). "Pertusi, Agostino (1918-1979)". In Iodice, M.; Spataro, S. R. (eds.). Dizionario dei grecisti italiani del XX secolo. Rome: Edizioni dell'Istituto Italiano di Studi Classici. pp. 397–405. ISBN 9788894683714.
- Redazione di «Studi veneziani» (1964). "Bollettino dell'Istituto di Storia della Società e dello Stato Veneziano V-VI". cini.it (in Italian). Venice: Cini Foundation.
- Richard, M. (1948). Répertoire des bibliothèques et des catalogues de manuscrits grecs. Paris: Éditions du C.N.R.S.
- Zakynthinos, D. A. (1979). "Μνήμη Agostino Pertusi (1918–1979)". Πρακτικὰ τῆς Ἀκαδεμίας Ἀθηνῶν: 56–57.
