= Pertusi =

Pertusi is a surname. Notable people with the surname include:

- Agostino Pertusi (1918–1979), Italian classical scholar and Byzantinist
- Ciro Pertusi (born 1968), Argentine musician
- Michele Pertusi (born 1965), Italian operatic bass
