= Rector of Università Cattolica del Sacro Cuore =

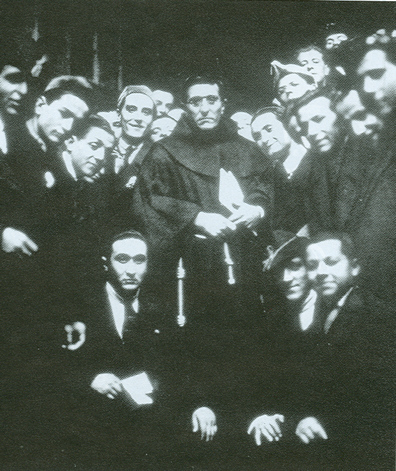
Agostino Gemelli, the first Rector of UCSC, surrounded by some students

The Rector of Università Cattolica del Sacro Cuore (Italian: Magnifico Rettore, commonly known just as the Rettore) is the highest academic authority of the university. The Rector legally represents the university, convenes and chairs the Board of Directors, the executive committee, the Academic Senate of the university and the advisory board of the Agostino Gemelli University Polyclinic. The rector may appoint one or more Vice Rectors to whom he can delegate the exercise of certain functions. Rectors remain in office for four years and can be re-elected for no more than two consecutive terms.

== History ==
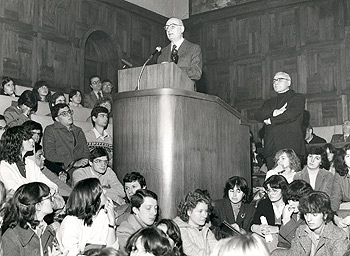
A speech by Giuseppe Lazzati in the great hall

Università Cattolica del Sacro Cuore was inaugurated on 7th of December 1921 and began operations with two faculties: Philosophy and Social Sciences. Agostino Gemelli was the rector of Cattolica until his death, widely teaching through the School of Law, Political Sciences, Humanities, Business and Economics in the Milan campus and at the School of Agriculture, in Piacenza.

Upon the death of Francesco Vito, Ezio Franceschini was elected as the third rector (1965–1968) and had to face the rise of student protests in 1968. Some professors found his pursuit of dialogue with the protesting students inadequate and, taking advantage of his poor health, replaced him in the rectory with Giuseppe Lazzati, which followed a line of more decisive break with the demands for renewal.

Lorenzo Ornaghi has been serving as the Italy's Minister of Culture in the Monti cabinet since 16 November 2011. After the appointment of Professor Lorenzo Ornaghi as minister, all the powers and functions belonging to the office of rector were entrusted to the vicar vice chancellor, prof. Franco Anelli, for the term of Ornaghi's office.

== Rectors of Cattolica ==
- Agostino Gemelli (1921–1959)
- Francesco Vito (1959–1965)
- Ezio Franceschini (1965–1968)
- Giuseppe Lazzati (1968–1983)
- Adriano Bausola (1983–1998)
- Sergio Zaninelli (1998–2002)
- Lorenzo Ornaghi (2002–2012)
- Franco Anelli (2012–2024)
- Elena Beccalli (2024–present)
