= Concetto Marchesi =

Italian academic and politician (1878–1957)

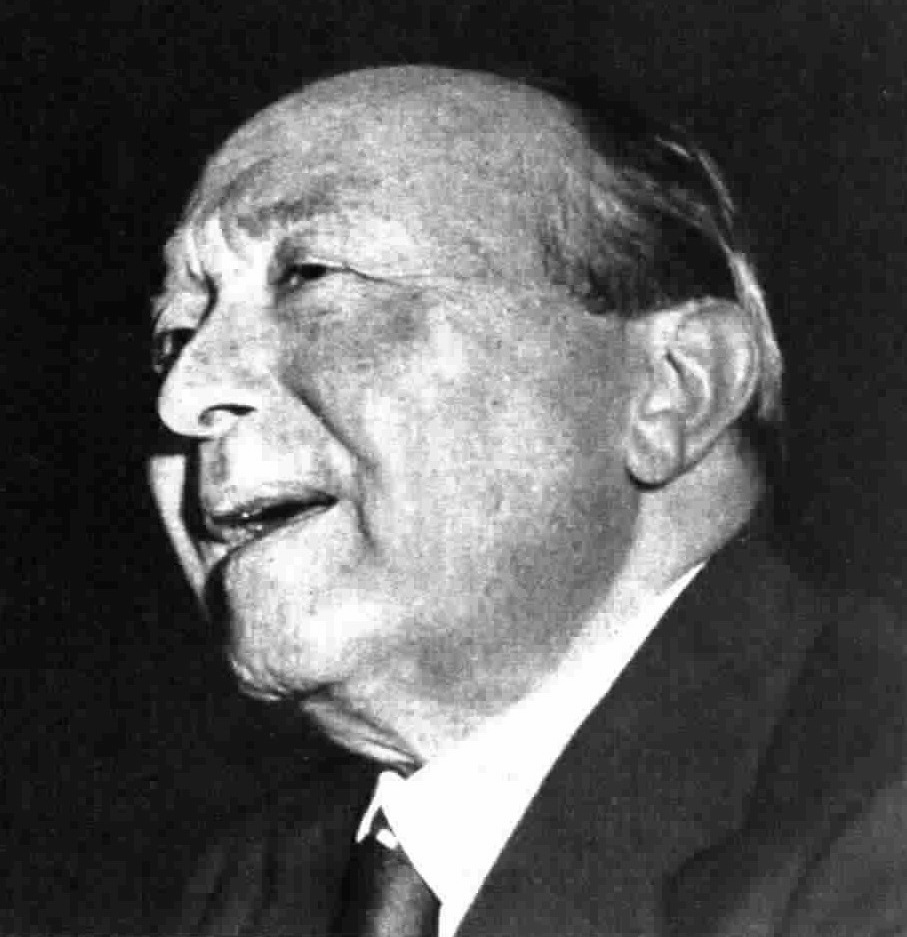
- Concetto Marchesi in 1954
- Born: 1 February 1878; Catania, Kingdom of Italy
- Died: 12 February 1957 (aged 79); Rome, Italy
- Political party: PSI (1905–1921); PCI (1921–1957)

Academic background
- Education: University of Florence

Academic work
- Discipline: Classical philology
- Institutions: Accademia Nazionale dei Lincei; Accademia d'Italia; University of Messina; University of Padua

Concetto Marchesi (1 February 1878 – 12 February 1957) was an Italian Latinist and politician. He represented the Italian Communist Party in the Constituent Assembly of Italy from 1946 to 1948 and in the Chamber of Deputies from 1948 to 1957.

== Life and career ==
=== Early life and academic career ===
Marchesi studied at the Nicola Spedalieri classical high school in Catania where in 1893 he founded a newspaper, Lucifero, which in its title revealed his admiration for the young Giosuè Carducci and for the democratic and anticlerical Mario Rapisardi professor of Italian and Latin literature at the local University.

When he turned 18, Marchesi was imprisoned for two months for the publication of a short book called Lucifero, a crime he had been convicted of two years previously. After his release, he left Catania and continued his studies in Florence. He graduated from the University of Florence in 1899, receiving a Laurea degree. After working at various schools, he became a high school teacher in Pisa in 1906. In 1910, he married Ada Sabbadini, the daughter of his academic teacher in Catania. In 1915, he was appointed to the chair of Latin literature at the University of Messina. There he earned another doctorate in law in 1923 with his thesis Il pensiero giuridico e politico di Tacito ("Legal and Political Thought in Tacitus"). In the same year he was appointed to the University of Padua.

A member of the Italian Socialist Party since 1905, Marchesi joined the Italian Communist Party after its foundation in 1921.

in 1931, according to Marchesi, he received from the instruction to swear allegiance to fascism (as it had been made obligatory for professors, under penalty of expulsion from the University). The Communists would have considered it useful to maintain in that important University a point of reference for conspiratorial political activities. In 1935 Marchesi swore a second time, when he became a member of the Accademia Nazionale dei Lincei, and a third time in 1939, when he became a member of the Accademia d'Italia, which too required the swear an oath of loyalty to the Fascist Regime as it had been imposed in the Statute of the Academy and Marchesi not only swore again, but also took the membership card of the National Fascist Party.

=== Anti-fascist resistance ===
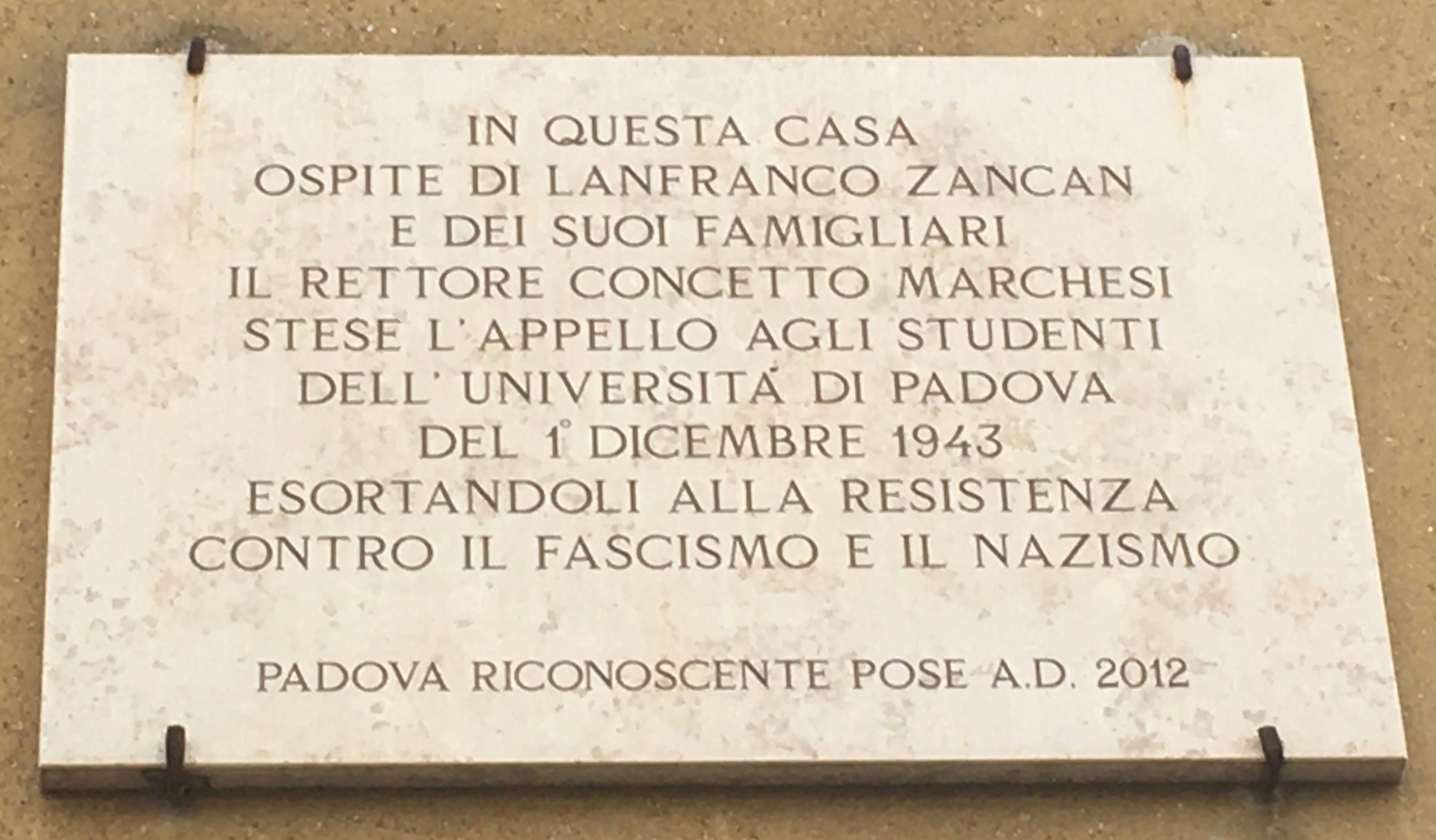
Memorial plaque im Padua commemorating the anti-fascist appeal written by Marchesi for university students.

Marchesi's contacts with the Communist Party resumed in 1942 through Lelio Basso. On May 26 Concetto Marchesi sent Maria José, through the liberal professor Carlo Anton, an anti-fascist and confidant of the princess, the willingness of the communists to support the ousting of Mussolini and the consequent new anti-fascist government, in which they would be willing to participate with a minister without portfolio. Marchesi was appointed as rector of the University of Padua in 1943 and On November 9, 1943, on the occasion of the opening of the Academic Year, he launched an appeal to the students of the University of Padua and to all young Italians to take up arms against fascism and Nazi oppression. After the establishment of the Nazi puppet regime of the Republic of Salò, Marchesi had to flee to Switzerland.

In Switzerland, where he had in contact partisan group commanded by his student Ezio Franceschini and took an active part in the struggle by establishing the partisan group, FRAMA group (based on the initials of Marchesi and Franceschini) led by himself and Franceschini.

After the fascist philosopher Giovanni Gentile called for national reconciliation under the new puppet regime, Marchesi wrote a scathing critique of Gentile's call for the reconciliation in Italy. The article appeared anonymously in a clandestine newspaper of the Milanese communists in a version that ended with the sentence: "For the supporters of the German invader and his fascist henchmen, Senator Gentile, the people's justice has issued the sentence: DEATH!". The concluding words were not part of Marchesi's original text and had been added by Girolamo Li Causi. But they were attributed to Marchesi's after Palmiro Togliatti reproduced the article in Rinascita of 1 June 1944 and preceded it with a note entitled "Death Sentence". After Gentile's assassination, which was condemned by the CLN, Marchesi himself joined the debate and defended the act without mentioning Gentile's name.

=== After Liberation and later life ===
In September 1945 he was appointed to the National Consultation, where he was president of the education and fine arts commission. In June 1946 he was elected to the Constituent Assembly on the PCI list, and participated in the writing of the Italian Constitution. His dissent with Togliatti is well known, because he refused to include the Lateran Pacts in article 7 of the Italian Constitution. From 1947, Marchesi was a member of the Central Committee of the PCI. Marchesi concluded his academic career at the University of Padua after his retirement in October 1953.

In 1956, during the 8th Congress of the PCI, Marchesi commented on the accusations launched against Joseph Stalin by Nikita Khrushchev during the 20th Congress of the CPSU, ironically stating that "Tiberius, one of the greatest and most infamous emperors of Rome, found his implacable accuser in Cornelius Tacitus, the greatest historian of the principality. Stalin, less fortunate, was given Nikita Khrushchev". In that same speech, supporting Palmiro Togliatti's line, he vehemently attacked the Hungarian Revolution of 1956 and the intellectuals who were defending it.

Marchesi died in 1957 and his commemoration at the Chamber of Deputies was held by Togliatti.

== Works ==
- Battaglie, Tipografia dell'Etna, Catania 1896.
- La vita e le opere di C. Elvio Cinna, Niccolò Giannotta Edit., Catania 1898.
- Documenti inediti sugli umanisti fiorentini della seconda meta del sec. XV. Appendice alla Vita e Opere di Bartolomeo della Fonte, Niccolò Giannotta Edit., Catania 1899.
- Bartolomeo Della Fonte, Bartholomaeus Fontius. Contributo alla storia degli studi classici in Firenze nella seconda meta del Quattrocento, Niccolò Giannotta Edit., Catania 1900.
- I Cantores Euphorionis, Bencini, Firenze-Roma 1901.
- Il compendio volgare dell'etica aristotelica e le fonti del libro VI del Tresor, E. Loescher, Torino 1903.
- M. Tullio Cicerone, L'oratore. Testo critico commentato ad uso delle scuole da Concetto Marchesi, Libreria editrice A. Trimarchi, Messina 1904.
- L'etica nicomachea nella tradizione latina medievale. Documenti e appunti, Libreria editrice A. Trimarchi, Messina 1904.
- Il volgarizzamento toscano del libro "Della vecchiezza" di Cicerone, 1904.
- Paolo Manuzio e talune polemiche sullo stile e sulla lingua nel Cinquecento, Visentini, Venezia 1905.
- Per la tradizione medievale dell'etica nicomachea, Tip. F. Nicastro, Messina 1905.
- La prima traduzione in volgare italico della Farsaglia di Lucano e una nuova redazione di essa in ottava rima, Unione tipografica cooperativa, Perugia 1905.
- I primordii dell'eloquenza agraria e popolare di Roma, Tipi della Rivista di storia antica, Padova 1905.
- La libertà stoica romana in un poeta satirico del I secolo. A. Persio Flacco, tip. dell'Unione coop. editrice, Roma 1906.
- Il volgarizzamento italico delle Declamationes pseudo-quintilianee, 1906.
- Di alcuni volgarizzamenti toscani in codici fiorentini, Unione tipografica cooperativa, Perugia 1907.
- Le fonti e la composizione del Thyestes di L. Anneo Seneca, E. Loescher, Torino 1907.
- Le allegorie ovidiane di Giovanni del Virgilio, Unione tipografica cooperativa, Perugia 1908.
- Q. Orazio Flacco, poeta cortigiano?, tip. dell'Unione coop. editrice, Roma, 1908.
- Il Tieste di L. Anneo Seneca. Saggio critico e traduzione (di) Concetto Marchesi, F. Battiato, Catania, 1908.
- Gli amori di un poeta cristiano, Tipografia dell'Unione editrice, Roma, 1909.
- Le donne e gli amori di Marco Valerio Marziale, Tipografia dell'Unione editrice, Roma, 1910.
- Il dubbio sull'anima immortale in due luoghi di Seneca, Tipografia dell'Unione editrice, Roma, 1910.
- Due grammatici latini del Medio evo, Unione tipografica cooperativa, Perugia, 1910.
- La terza satira oraziana del primo libro, E. Loescher, Torino, 1910
- Valerio Marziale, Formiggini, Genova, 1914
- Seneca, Principato, Messina, 1920
- Petronio, Formiggini, Roma, 1921
- Giovenale, Formiggini, Roma, 1921
- Tacito, Principato, Roma-Messina, 1924
- Storia della letteratura latina, 2 voll., Principato, Milano-Messina, 1925-1927; 8ª edizione riveduta, Principato, Milano-Messina, 1957-1958
- Storia della letteratura romana, Principato, Milano-Messina, 1931
- Augusto fra i poeti e gli storici del primo secolo, Olschki, Firenze, 1938
- Motivi dell'epica antica, Principato, Milano-Messina, 1942
- La persona umana nel comunismo, Realtà, Roma, 1946.
- Scuola pubblica. Discorso pronunciato all'Assemblea costituente nella seduta del 22 aprile 1947, Tipografia della Camera dei deputati, Roma, 1947
- Disegno storico della letteratura latina, Principato, Milano-Messina, 1948
- Divagazioni, Neri Pozza, Venezia 1951
- Antifascismo bandiera di libertà. Conferenza tenuta a Bologna il 28 novembre 1954 nel Salone del Podestà, Soc. Tip. Ed. Bolognese, Bologna, 1955
- Nel decennale della Resistenza, a cura de Il Risorgimento, Milano, 1955
