= Lorenzo Ornaghi =

Italian politician

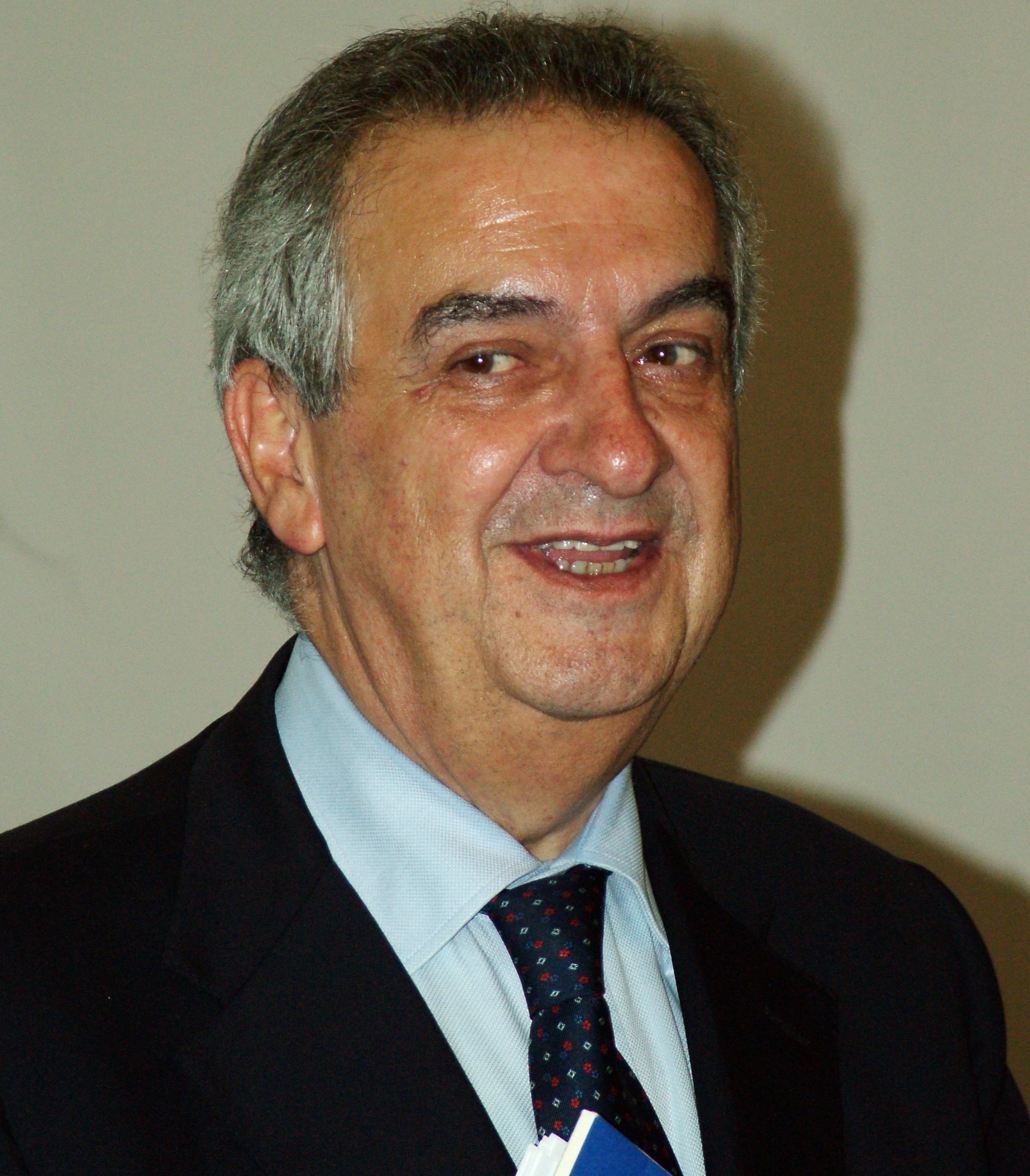

Minister of Culture
- In office 16 November 2011 – 28 April 2013
- Prime Minister: Mario Monti
- Preceded by: Giancarlo Galan
- Succeeded by: Massimo Bray

Personal details
- Born: 25 October 1948 (age 77) Villasanta
- Party: Independent
- Education: Università Cattolica, Milan

Lorenzo Ornaghi (born 25 October 1948) is an academic who served as the minister of culture in Monti cabinet.

== Early life and education ==
Ornaghi was born on 25 October 1948 in Villasanta, Italy. He graduated with a bachelor's degree in political science from Università Cattolica del Sacro Cuore (UCSC), Milan campus, in 1972.

== Career ==
Prior to becoming minister, Ornaghi was the rector of the UCSC from 1 November 2002 to November 2011. He is a member of the board of Avvenire, a Roman Catholic magazine. He was appointed minister of culture on 16 November 2011. His term ended in April 2013.

Academic offices
Preceded by Sergio Zaninelli	Rector of Università Cattolica del Sacro Cuore; 1 November 2002 – November 2011	Succeeded by Franco Anelli
Political offices
Preceded by Giancarlo Galan	Italian Minister of Culture; 2011 - 2013	Succeeded by Massimo Bray
