= Giuseppe Lazzati =

Italian politician

Venerable Giuseppe Lazzati
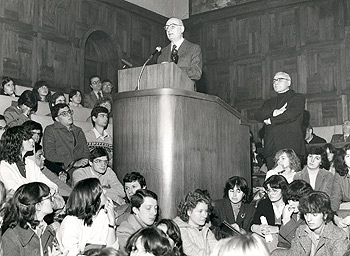
- Born: 22 June 1909; Milan, Kingdom of Italy
- Died: 18 May 1986 (aged 76); Milan, Italy

Giuseppe Lazzati (22 June 1909 – 18 May 1986) was an Italian rector of the Sacred Heart college in Milan and a former parliamentarian. He was also the founder of the Secular Institute of Christ the King. Lazzati served as a professor and for a time served as a politician at the close of the Second World War despite initial hesitance in doing so. He later resigned to further dedicate himself to his lecturing while instituting the Secular Institute of Christ the King to bring together men who wished to consecrate themselves to God though not as religious. He was a collaborator of several well-known figures in Italian politics such as Giorgio La Pira and Aldo Moro while he maintained close relationships with Pope Paul VI and Pope John Paul II.

The cause for Lazzati's beatification was opened in 1994 and in 2013 Pope Francis named him as venerable after recognizing that Lazzati had lived a life of heroic virtue.

== Life ==
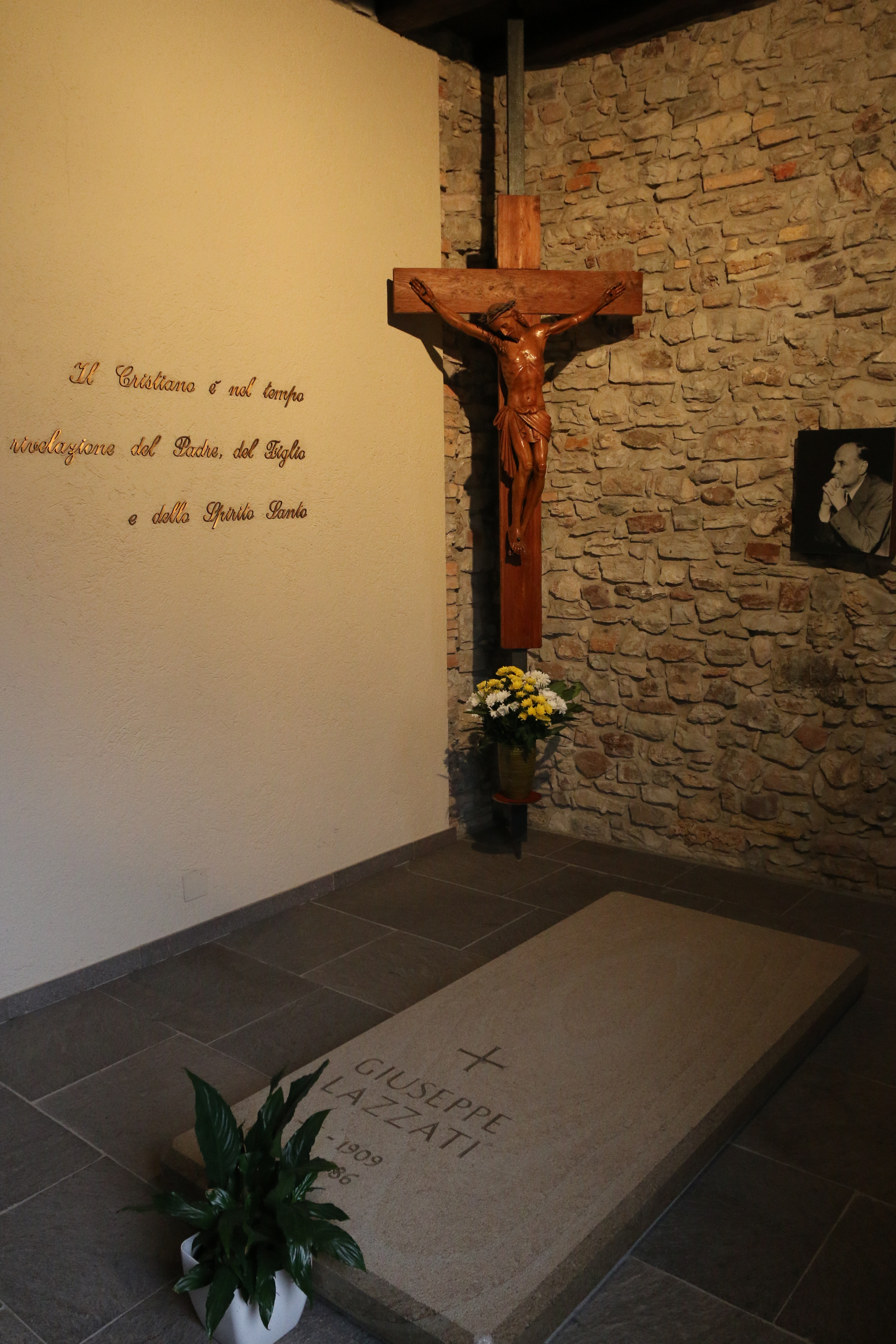
Tomb

Giuseppe Lazzati was born on 22 June 1909 in Milan in the Porta Ticinese district as the fourth of eight to Carlo Lazzati and Angela Mezzanotte. His baptism was celebrated on 25 June at the church of San Gottardo al Corso in Milan.

Lazzati began his schooling in 1915 but had to stop in 1918 since his parents decided to move to Alassio in order for his father to recuperate from tuberculosis. He returned to Milan in 1920 for his high school studies and was considered to be a brilliant student in his Latin and Greek studies.

In his late adolescence he experienced the dramatic upheavals in Italian life in the period that followed the First World War with the violent rise to prominence of Fascism that Benito Mussolini led. Since 1920 he attended meetings of the student association "Santo Stanislao" in Milan which had an influence on his religious formation. In 1927 he became a student in the department of Classical Literature of the Sacred Heart college in Milan which was under the direction of Father Agostino Gemelli; in 1931 he received his degree with the grade summa cum laude. Professor Paolo Ubaldi was his mentor during the course of his education. In 1931 he arrived at a decision to remain celibate and to opt for a consecrated life in the world. In 1934 he embarked upon a career as a lecturer and also in 1934 became the president for the diocese of Milan of the Youth Branch of Catholic Action and remained in the post until 1945. In 1939 he was appointed to the grade of "docente incaricato" in Ancient Christian Literature also in 1939 founded under the name Milites Christi an organization for consecrated men which in 1969 assumed the name Secular Institute of Christ the King. He did this with the support of Cardinal Alfredo Ildefonso Schuster. It received papal approval in 1963 from Pope Paul VI.

The outbreak of the Second World War saw Lazzati commissioned as a lieutenant in the Fifth Alpine Regiment in the Trent Division and in the wake of the 8 September 1943 Armistice of Cassibile - upon his refusal to swear allegiance to the Fascist puppet rump state known as the Italian Social Republic - he was arrested in Merano and interned in Nazi concentration camps. He was interned first at Rum near Innsbruck in Austria then at Dęblin in Poland and then at Oberlangen as well as Sandbostel and Wietzendorf in the Nazi heartland. He tried to comfort his fellow prisoners so as to make the experience a bit more bearable.

He returned to his home in August 1945 and became involved with Giuseppe Dossetti (who convinced him to enter politics) and Giorgio La Pira in efforts for rebuilding Italian civic life in connection with the convocation of the Assemblea Costituente and then entered politics. In 1946 he became part of the national administration of the Christian Democrats and was elected to the Assemblea Costituente (1946–1948) on 2 June 1946 and then to the Chamber of Deputies of the new Italian Parliament (1948–1953). It was during this time he also collaborated with important political figures such as Aldo Moro and Amintore Fanfani. In 1947 he and Giuseppe Dossetti launched a political magazine entitled Cronache Sociali.

The end of his service in the parliament saw him he return to Milan where devoted his energies to the formation of men and women. But another motivator for his retirement from politics was the retirement of his good friend Dossetti. The appointment of the newest Archbishop of Milan Giovanni Battista Montini - the future Pope Paul VI - led to his appointment to a number of roles including in 1961 the onerous position of editor of the paper L'Italia; he remained in that position until 1964.

Lazzati returned to lecturing from 1958 and during the storm of student upheavals was appointed to succeed Ezio Franceschini as the rector of the Sacred Heart college which turned into a position he held for five terms until 1983. In this period he entrusted the post of Director of the Departiment of Religious Studies to his former assistant Raniero Cantalamessa who was serving at the time as a professor of Christian Origins. In 1979 - upon reaching the age limit - Lazzati retired from the Chair of Ancient Christian Literature and his former student Luigi Franco Pizzolato succeeded him.

Lazzati dedicated his retirement to find a path out of the profound crisis of Italian politics and he attempted to do this through the relaunching of a programme of political ideals through the foundation in 1985 of the association "Città dell'uomo" which served as a revival in large part of the post-war "Civitas Humana".

Lazzati died in Milan in mid-1986 at Pentecost at the Capitanio Clinic. In 1984 doctors had diagnosed him with an incurable intestinal tumor and had to operate on him to alleviate the pain. He was hospitalized during the morning of 27 March 1986 - Holy Thursday - and he received a phone call from Pope John Paul II. He was hospitalized once again two months later at the Capitanio Clinic and on 14 May his priest friend Giuseppe Grampa celebrated Mass for him at his bedside and gave him the Anointing of the Sick. His institute still exists and operates across the globe in places such as New Zealand and Uganda. Since September 1988 his remains have been housed at the San Salvatore Hermitage.

== Beatification process ==
In 1991 the Secular Institute of Christ the King began promoting the cause for Lazzati's beatification which received archdiocesan approval before it could be considered on a formal level. Cardinal Carlo Maria Martini provided personal support to this cause. The Congregation for the Causes of Saints approved this request and on 17 June 1994 launched the cause while titling Lazzati as a Servant of God. Cardinal Martini oversaw the diocesan phase of investigation from 17 December 1994 until 14 December 1996. The cause was then transferred to Rome where the Congregation validated the diocesan phase on 3 October 1997 and received the positio from the cause's officials in 2001.

Theologians met and approved the cause after scouring the contents of the positio on 7 October 2011 while the cardinal and bishop members for the C.C.S. likewise approved it on 4 June 2013. The cause culminated on 5 July 2013 when Pope Francis approved the promulgation of a decree that recognized that Lazzati had lived a life of heroic virtue which also conferred the title of a venerable upon him. The postulator overseeing this cause is Pier Giorgio Confalonieri.

== Published works ==
- Teofilo d'Alessandria, Milano: Vita e pensiero, 1935
- L'Aristotele perduto e gli scrittori cristiani, Milano: Vita e pensiero, 1938
- Introduzione allo studio di Clemente Alessandrino, Milano: Vita e pensiero, 1939
- Gli sviluppi della litteratura sui martiri nei primi quattro secoli, Torino: Società editrice internazionale 1956
- Il fondamento di ogni ricostruzione, Milano: Vita e pensiero, 1947
- I Laici nella Chiesa, Milano: Gioventù italiana di azione cattolica, Presidenza diocesana milanese, 1954
- Il valore letterario della esegesi ambrosiana, Milano, 1960
- Azione cattolica e azione politica, Vicenza: La Locusta, 1962
- Maturità del laicato, Brescia: La Scuola, 1962
- Lo Spirito Santo nella vita della Chiesa, Milano: Edizione Corsia dei Servi, 1964
- La scuola cattolica, Trento: Edizioni scuola cattolica diocesana, 1978
- Francesco d'Assisi nell'ottavo centenario della nascità, Milano: Vita e Pensiero, 1982
- La città dell'uomo: costruire, da cristiani, la città dell'uomo a misura d'uomo, Roma: AVE, 1984
- Laicità e impegno cristiano nelle realtà temporali, Roma: AVE, 1985
- Per una nuova maturità del laicato: il fedele, Roma: AVE, 1986
- Il laico, Roma: AVE, 1986
- Chiesa, laici ed impegno storico: scritti (1947-65) riediti in memoria, Milano: Vita e pensiero, 1987
- La carità, Roma: AVE, 1987
- La verità, Roma: AVE, 1987
- La prudenza, Roma: AVE, 1987
- Pensare politicamente, Da cristiani nella società e nello Stato, Roma: AVE, 1988
- La vita come vocazione, Roma: AVE, 1990
- Il Regno di Dio, Roma: AVE, 1990
- Il cristiano nella città dell'uomo, Bezzecca: Citta dell'uomo Valle di Ledro, 1991
- La spiritualità laicale, Roma: AVE, 1992
- Lo Spirito Santo, Roma: AVE, 1992
- Spiritualità della professione, Roma: AVE, 1993
- La verità vi farà liberi, In Dialogo, 2006
- Chiesa, cittadinanza e laicità, In Dialogo, 2004
- Laici cristiani nella città dell'uomo: scritti ecclesiali e politici, 1945-1986, Cinisello Balsamo: San Paolo, 2009

== See also ==
- Catholic Action

== Secondary works ==
- R. Cantalamessa & L.F. Pizzolato (edd.), Paradoxos politeia: Studi patristici in onore di Giuseppe Lazzati, Milano: Vita e pensiero, 1979
- A. Oberti (ed.), Giuseppe Lazzati: vivere da laico, Edizioni AVE, Rome, 1991
- A. Oberti, Giovanni Battista Montini e Giuseppe Lazzati, Roma: AVE, 1992
- Lazzati, il lager, il regno, Roma: AVE, 1993
- Lazzati, i laici, la secolarità, Roma: AVE, 1994
- Lazzati e le ACLI, Roma: AVE, 1995
- Lazzati, Dossetti, il dossettismo, Roma: AVE, 1997
- M. Rizzi, Lazzati e l'Ad Diognetum, Roma: AVE, 1999
- Il “progetto culturale” di Giuseppe Lazzati, Roma AVE 1999
- T. Turi, Laicità e laicato nel pensiero di Giuseppe Lazzati, Città del Vaticano: Pontificia Università Lateranense, 1990
- A. Oberti, La Città dell'uomo nel mistero di Dio: Giuseppe Lazzati, Città del Vaticano: Libreria Editrice Vaticana, 2002
- M. Malpensa & A. Parola, Lazzati. Una sentinella nella notte (1909-1986), Bologna: Il Mulino, 2005

Academic offices
Preceded by Ezio Franceschini	Rector of Università Cattolica del Sacro Cuore; 1968 - 1983	Succeeded by Adriano Bausola
