= Franco Anelli =

Italian academic and rector (1963–2024)

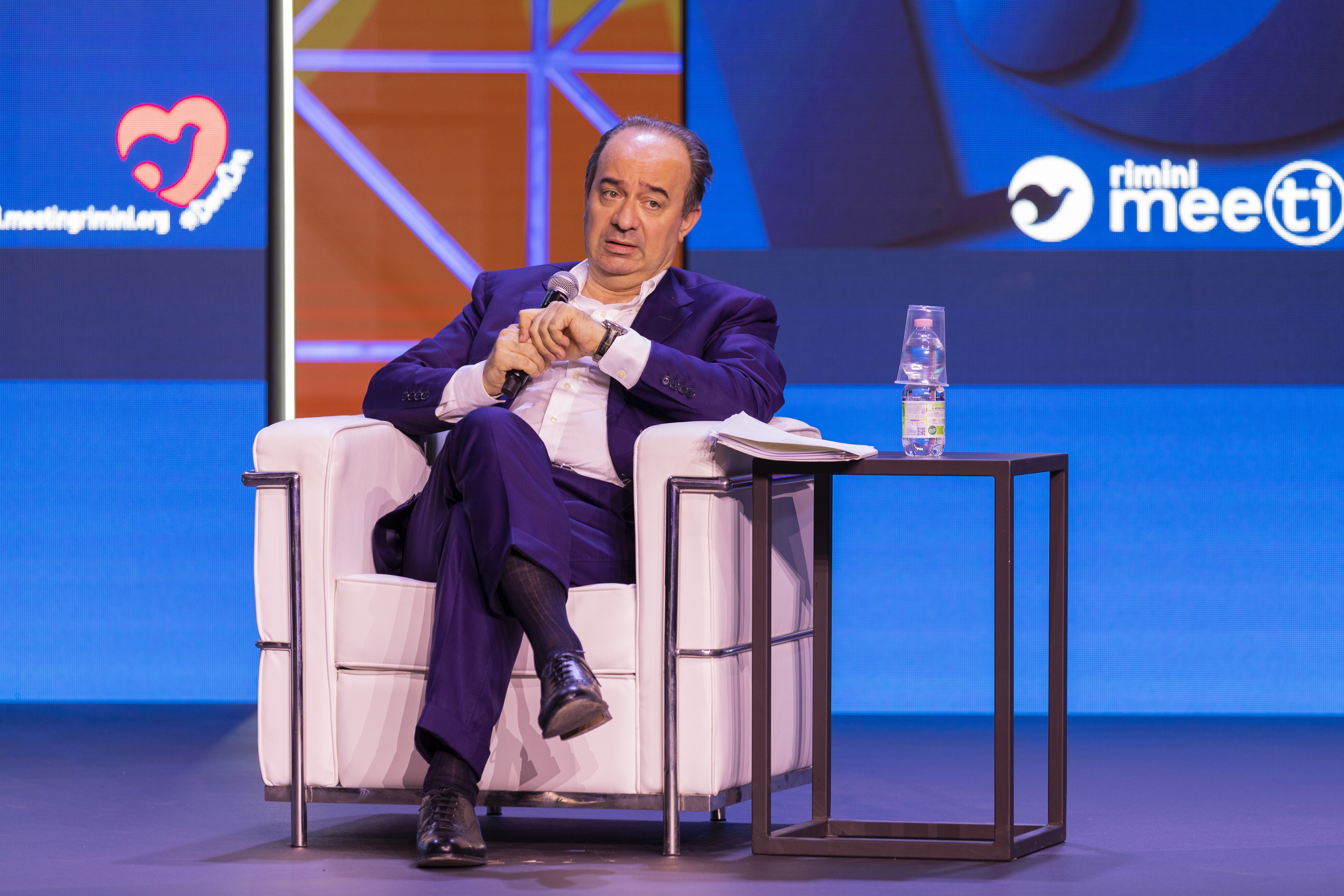
Anelli in 2021

Franco Anelli (26 June 1963 – 23 May 2024) was an Italian academic and rector.

== Biography ==
Anelli was born in Piacenza on 26 June 1963. He was a professor of private law from 1993. He graduated in law at Università Cattolica del Sacro Cuore. After a PhD in commercial law, he became an associate professor of institutions of private law at the Faculty of Economics and Business. He mainly dealt with the law of obligations, contracts and property rights of the family. He also updated the Torrente-Schlesinger Manual of Private Law published by Giuffrè. He was appointed the rector of Università Cattolica in December 2012. Anelli committed suicide by jumping in Milan, on 23 May 2024, at the age of 60.

Academic offices
| Preceded by Lorenzo Ornaghi | Rector of Università Cattolica del Sacro Cuore; 12 December 2012 – 23 May 2024 | Succeeded by Vacant |
