= Massimo Bray =

Italian intellectual and politician (born 1959)

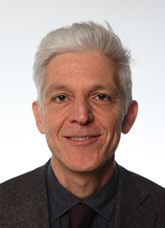

Minister of Cultural Heritage and Tourism
- In office 28 April 2013 – 22 February 2014
- Prime Minister: Enrico Letta
- Preceded by: Lorenzo Ornaghi
- Succeeded by: Dario Franceschini

Member of the Italian Parliament
- In office 15 March 2013 – 18 March 2015

Councillor for Culture and Tourism of the Apulia region
- In office 19 November 2020 – 25 November 2021

Personal details
- Born: 11 April 1959 (age 67) Lecce
- Education: Università degli Studi di Firenze
- Profession: General manager of the Treccani Institute; politician

Massimo Bray (born 11 April 1959) is an Italian publisher, politician, and historian. He served as the minister of cultural heritage and tourism in the Letta government from 28 April 2013 to 22 February 2014. He is currently the general manager of the Treccani Institute.

== Biography ==
Born in Lecce in 1959, Bray attended the classical high school. He then studied in Florence, earning a degree in literature and philosophy in 1984. After he obtained a DEA in history in Paris (EHHSS).

In 1991 Bray joined the Institute of the Italian Encyclopaedia, also known as the Treccani, founded by Giovanni Treccani, as editor in charge of the modern history section and in 1994 he became editorial director. He has been its general manager since 2015.

Bray was on the editorial board of the Italian Institute of Human Sciences until 1994 and the director of the Italianieuropei magazine. He was president of the Notte della Taranta foundation, which organizes an important popular music festival.

Bray is the author of a blog in the Italian edition of the Huffington Post.

As president of the Foundation for Books, Music and Culture (Italian: Fondazione per il libro, la musica e la cultura), Bray was in charge of the 2017 and 2018 editions of the Salone Internazionale del Libro in Turin.

Since 2019, Bray has been teaching history of publishing at the Suor Orsola Benincasa University of Naples.

In 2019, Bray published a book entitled Alla voce Cultura. Suspended diary of my experience as minister.

The following year, Massimo Bray was honored with the President's Special Prize at the Viareggio-Repaci Award.

During the 18th edition of the Benedetto Croce Prize, held in Pescasseroli (L’Aquila) in 2023, Bray was awarded the Special PNAL Award (Italian: Parco Nazionale Abruzzo Lazio e Molise).

=== Political career ===
==== Election to Parliament ====
Bray was elected to the Chamber of Deputies in the general election, which was held on 24 and 25 February 2013, with the Democratic Party.

==== Minister of Cultural Heritage and Tourism ====
From 28 April 2013, to 22 February 2014, Bray served as the minister of cultural heritage and tourism in the Letta Government. He replace Lorenzo Ornaghi in the post. Bray's term ended in February 2014 when he was succeeded in the Renzi Government by Dario Franceschini.

On 18 March 2015, Bray resigned from the Chamber of Deputies citing his intention to dedicate time to his work at the Treccani Institute. He was replaced by Deputy Ludovico Vico.

==== Councillor for Culture and Tourism of the Apulia region ====
On 19 November 2020, Bray was appointed by President Michele Emiliano as the councillor for culture and tourism of the Apulia Region. On 25 November 2021, he announced his resignation from the post for personal reasons.

== Books ==
Alla voce Cultura. Diario sospeso della mia esperienza di Ministro, Lecce, Manni Editori 2019 ISBN 978-88-6266-941-2.

Political offices
Preceded by Lorenzo Ornaghi	Italian Minister of Culture and Tourism; 2013–2014	Succeeded by Dario Franceschini
