= Cronache Sociali =

Italian political magazine (1947–1951)

- Categories: Political magazine
- Frequency: Biweekly
- Founder: Giuseppe Dossetti; Giuseppe Lazzati
- Founded: 1947
- Final issue: 1951
- Country: Italy
- Based in: Rome
- Language: Italian

Cronache Sociali (Italian: Social Chronicles) was a biweekly political magazine that was published in Rome, Italy, from 1947 to 1951. It was one of the publications associated with factions within the Christian Democracy (DC) and primarily focused on political economy.

== History and profile ==
Cronache Sociali was started by Giuseppe Dossetti and Giuseppe Lazzati in 1947. Some academics from the Università Cattolica del Sacro Cuore in Milan were also instrumental in establishing the magazine. Its goal was to promote an economic approach called Catholic Keynesianism in line with Catholic values. Based in Rome, it was published biweekly.

Cronache Sociali was affiliated with leftist figures within the DC, including Giorgio La Pira and Leopoldo Elia. The magazine's contributors were part of a faction within the DC known as Cronache Sociali. This group used the magazine to defend their ideology of integral democracy which supported Christian solidarity in the realms of the state, society and the economy. They were critical of Alcide De Gasperi, the leader of the DC, and their motto was First the person and then the market.

Cronache Sociali folded in 1951, and the faction led by Dossetti was also disbanded. The magazine was archived by the University of Bologna.
