= Francesco Vito =

Italian economist and university rector

Francesco Maria Gerard Vito (Pignataro Maggiore, October 21, 1902 - Milan, April 6, 1968) was an Italian economist and university rector.

== Biography ==
In 1925, he graduated in law from the University of Naples, in 1926 in Economics, and Social and Political Philosophy in 1928. Between 1929 and 1934, completed his studies at schools and universities of Monaco of Bavaria, Berlin, London, New York and Chicago. In 1935, he obtained the chair of Economics at the Faculty of Political Science of the Università Cattolica del Sacro Cuore of Milan and held it until his death. In 1959, after the death of Father Agostino Gemelli he became Rector of the Catholic University of Milan.

== Works ==
- 1930 - I sindacati industriali. Cartelli e gruppi

Academic offices
Preceded by Agostino Gemelli	Rector of Università Cattolica del Sacro Cuore; 1959 - 1965	Succeeded by Ezio Franceschini
