= Ludovico Vico =

Italian politician (1952–2021)

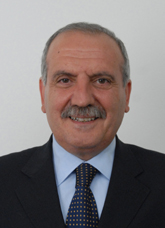

Member of the Chamber of Deputies of Italy
- In office 28 April 2006 – 15 March 2013
- Constituency: Apulia
- In office 18 March 2015 – 22 March 2018
- Constituency: Apulia

Personal details
- Born: 11 February 1952 Taranto, Italy
- Died: 8 September 2021 (aged 69) Manduria, Italy
- Party: PCI (till 1991); PDS (1991-1998); DS (1998-2007); PD (2007-2021)

Ludovico Vico (11 February 1952 – 8 September 2021) was an Italian politician.

== Biography ==
Vico was born in Taranto on 11 February 1952 and later lived in Matera. He first became a member of the Italian Communist Party before joining the Democratic Party of the Left. In 2006, he was elected to the Chamber of Deputies, representing the constituency of Puglia. There, he joined The Olive Tree coalition. He was re-elected in 2008 as a member of the Democratic Party. He finished second in 2013 and left the Chamber.

Vico returned to the Chamber of Deputies on 15 March 2015 following the resignation of Massimo Bray. On 28 July 2017, following the passage of a law to make certain vaccines mandatory, he, alongside Elisa Mariano and Salvatore Capone, was attacked outside the Palazzo Montecitorio by antivaccine protesters. They sought refuge in a vehicle, which was then kicked and punched by the protesters.

Ludovico Vico died in Manduria on 8 September 2021 at the age of 69.
