= Sergio Zaninelli =

Italian academic (1929–2025)

Sergio Zaninelli (24 May 1929 – 23 September 2025) was an Italian academic.

== Life and career ==
Zaninelli was born in Milan, Italy, on 24 May 1929. In 1955 he graduated in law at the University of Milan. A few years later, in 1959, he began his academic career at the Università Cattolica del Sacro Cuore in Milan, first as a volunteer assistant of Mario Romani professor of economic history, then as a lecturer in the history of the labor movement, economic history and history of agriculture. From 1980 to 1983 he was vice chancellor of the university, for three successive terms of three years he was dean of the faculty of economics and commerce. From 1993 he sat on the board of directors of Catholic and in 1998 was elected rector of the Catholic University of Sacred Heart. Zaninelli died on 23 September 2025, at the age of 96.

Academic offices
Preceded by Adriano Bausola	Rector of Università Cattolica del Sacro Cuore; 1 November 1998 – 31 October 2002	Succeeded by Lorenzo Ornaghi
