= Ezio Franceschini =

Ezio Franceschini (Italian pronunciation: [ˈɛttsjo frantʃesˈkiːni]; 25 July 1906 in Villa Agnedo – 21 March 1983 in Padua) was an Italian scholar and philologist of Latin, professor of medieval Latin literature, as well as rector of the Università Cattolica del Sacro Cuore (UCSC).

== Biography ==
He graduated in literature from the University of Padua in 1928 and became an assistant to Concetto Marchesi. In 1938 he won the first competition in Italy for a chair of Medieval Latin literature, and from the following year he was the holder of that seat (which he had already held by appointment since 1936) at the Università Cattolica del Sacro Cuore.

In 1943, after the armistice, together with other professors, Franceschini supported the Resistance. Among these, in particular, there was his teacher Concetto Marchesi, a leading figure of the Italian Communist Party, who Franceschini helped to emigrate to Switzerland, in February 1944. Together they founded the FRAMA group in Padua (from the initials of Franceschini and Marchesi), which devoted itself above all to the benefit of international military prisoners of war.

He was Dean, from 1953 to 1965, of the Faculty of Letters of the Università Cattolica. From 1932 he had joined the institute of the Missionaries of the Kingship of Christ, founded by Father Agostino Gemelli, rector of the university, in 1928; he himself refounded the Institute as President, in 1942.

When Francesco Vito died, Ezio Franceschini was elected the third rector of UCSC (1965–1968) and faced the rise of student protest of 1968. Franceschini was a corresponding member since 1947 and national member since 1959 of Accademia dei Lincei.

Academic offices
Preceded by Francesco Vito	Rector of Università Cattolica del Sacro Cuore; 1965–1968	Succeeded by Giuseppe Lazzati
