= Adriano Bausola =

Italian philosopher (1930–2000)

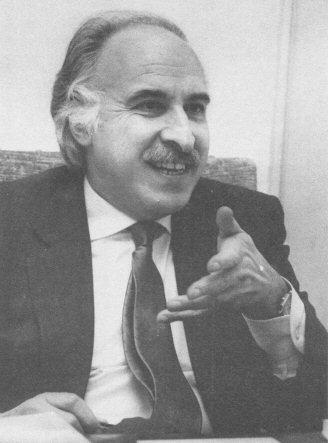
Adriano Bausola

Adriano Bausola (22 December 1930 – 28 April 2000) was an Italian philosopher and academic.

== Biography ==
Bausola was rector of Università Cattolica del Sacro Cuore. Among other tasks and functions are:

- Member of the National Academy of Lincei in philosophical sciences category;
- Member of the Institute Lombardo – Academy of Sciences and Letters;
- Board member of the Italian Philosophical Society;
- Vice President of the Organizing and Scientific Committee of the Social Weeks of Italian Catholics from 1985 to 1994;
- Consultant to the Sacred Congregation for Catholic Education;
- Chairman of Committees of the Church's evangelization and human promotion conference in Rome from 30 October to 4 November 1976;
- Moderator of one of the five fields of Reconciliation Christian Church Conference and the human community in Loreto 9 to 13 April 1985;
- Auditor to the Extraordinary Synod of Bishops called by the Pope for the 20th anniversary of Vatican II;

== Honour ==
- Italy: Knight Grand Cross of the Order of Merit of the Italian Republic (2 June 1988)

Academic offices
Preceded by Giuseppe Lazzati	Rector of Università Cattolica del Sacro Cuore; 1983 – 31 October 1998	Succeeded by Sergio Zaninelli
