= Marcel Richard =

Marcel Richard (1907–1976) was a French Catholic priest and a Greek paleographer. He was the founder of the Greek section of the Institut de Recherche et d'Histoire des Textes in Paris. He was primarily interested in establishing the text of patristic Greek authors. To this effect he conducted several missions to the Libraries of Mount Athos.

Richard contributed the opening volume (with posthumous appendix by Michel Aubineau) of the Corpus Christianorum Series Graeca in 1977. A later volume in the series was completed after Richard's death by Joseph Munitiz.

== Bibliography ==
- Iohannis Caesariensis Presbyteri et Grammatici opera quae supersunt (Corpus Christianorum, Series Graeca 1), Turnhout Brepols/Leuven University Press 1977.
- Anastasii Sinaitae Quaestiones et Responsiones (Corpus Christianorum. Series Graeca 59, Brepols/Leuven University Press, Turnhout/Leuven 2006.

Most of Richard's articles can be found in Opera Minora, 3 vol., Leuven University Press, Brepols, 1976.
